= Alex Miller (writer) =

Australian novelist

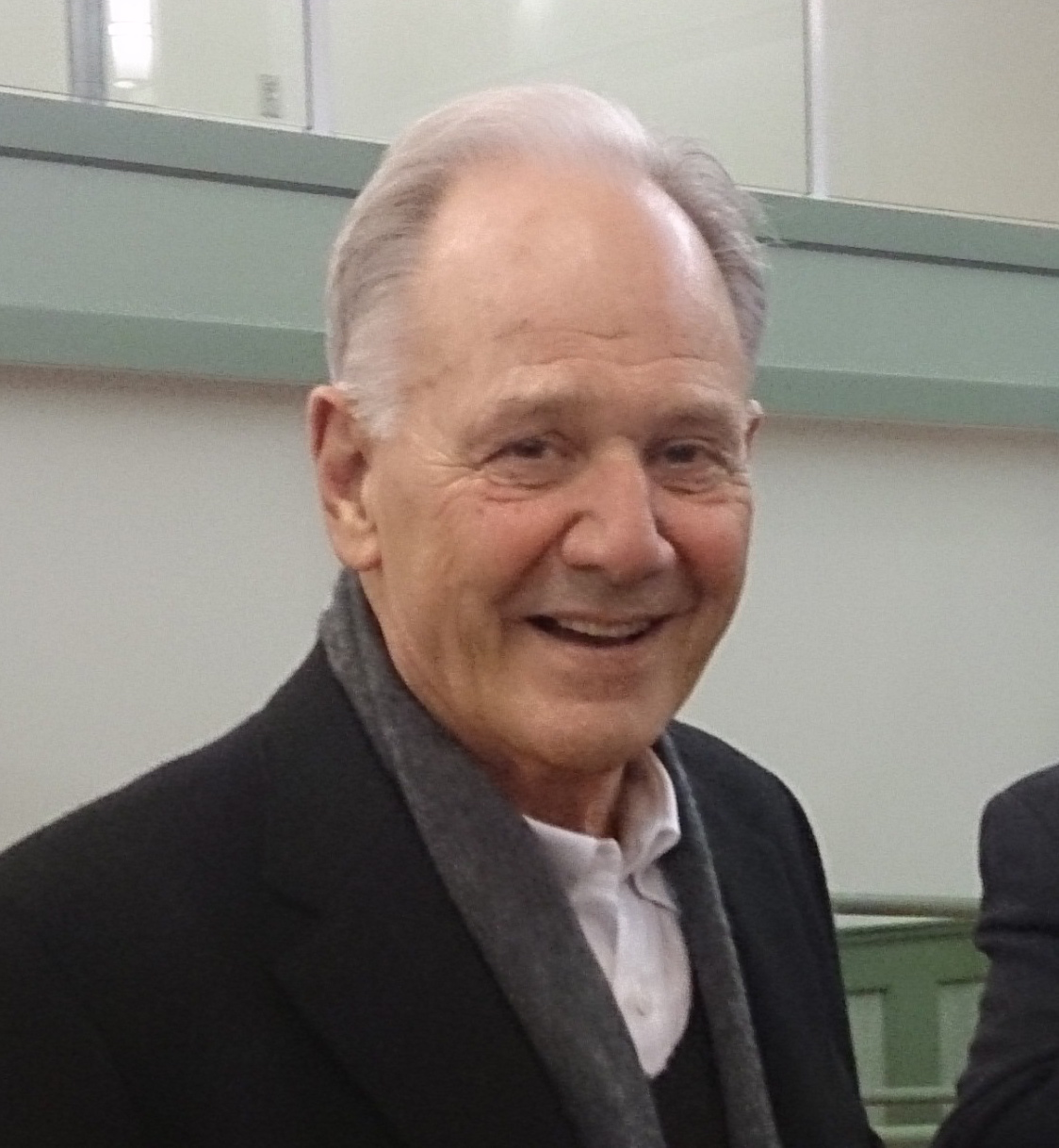
- Alex Miller at Vassar College, New York, 2013
- Born: Alexander McPhee Miller; 27 December 1936 (age 89); London, England
- Occupation: Novelist
- Writing career
- Period: 1975–present
- Genre: Literary fiction
- Notable works: The Ancestor Game, Journey to the Stone Country, Lovesong
- Notable awards: Miles Franklin Award; 1993, 2003

Alexander McPhee Miller (born 27 December 1936) is one of Australia's most distinguished writers. Miller is twice winner of the Miles Franklin Award, in 1993 for The Ancestor Game and in 2003 for Journey to the Stone Country. He won the overall award for the Commonwealth Writer's Prize for The Ancestor Game in 1993. He is twice winner of the New South Wales Premier's Literary Awards Christina Stead Prize for Conditions of Faith in 2001 and for Lovesong in 2011. In recognition of his impressive body of work and in particular for his novel Autumn Laing he was awarded the Melbourne Prize for Literature in 2012.

== Life ==
Alex Miller was born in London to a Scottish father and Irish mother. After working as a farm labourer in Somerset he migrated alone to Australia at the age of 16. He worked as a ringer in Queensland and as a horse breaker in New Zealand before studying at night school to gain university entrance. Miller graduated from the University of Melbourne in English and History in 1965. In 1975 he published his first short story, 'Comrade Pawel' in Meanjin Quarterly. In 1980 he was a co-founder of the Anthill Theatre and a founding member of the Melbourne Writers' Theatre. Miller taught writing courses at Holmesglen TAFE and La Trobe University between 1986 and 1997. Miller has written full-time since 1998. In this time he has written nine of his thirteen published novels and his non-fiction, Max. His work has received wide critical acclaim.

Alex Miller lives in country Victoria with his wife Stephanie (Dr Stephanie Miller). The Ancestor Game was re-published by Allen & Unwin in 2016 as a celebratory edition to mark 25 years since its publication and to honour the author on his 80th birthday.

== Writing ==
Miller's first novel, Watching the Climbers on the Mountain, was published in 1988 and republished by Allen & Unwin in 2012. Major national and international recognition came with the publication of The Ancestor Game, his third novel and the winner of both the Miles Franklin Award and overall winner of the Commonwealth Writers' Prize in 1993. Since then Miller has published on average a major novel every two years, his tenth being Autumn Laing published in 2011. The Melbourne critic Peter Craven, writing in The Australian on 14 July 2012, described Autumn Laing as "superb" and said "it is the novel that is liable to burn brightest in the whole of his oeuvre." Professor Brenda Walker suggests that "Alex Miller may be Australia's greatest living writer."

Robert Dixon, Professor of Australian Literature at the University of Sydney writes that Miller's "novels are by and large accessible to the general reading public yet manifestly of high literary seriousness - substantial, technically masterly and assured, intricately interconnected, and of great imaginative, intellectual and ethical weight." The Novels of Alex Miller, edited and with an introduction by Robert Dixon, was published in 2012 following a two-day symposium at the University of Sydney in 2011 as a major critical study devoted to Miller's works. In 2014 Robert Dixon published the first sole-authored critical survey of the respected author's eleven novels. Robert Dixon's Alex Miller: the ruin of time is the first of the Sydney Studies in Australian Literature series.

Miller's novel Autumn Laing was inspired by his lifelong interest in art and is loosely based on the relationship between Sidney Nolan and Sunday Reed.

Coal Creek, published in 2013 by Allen & Unwin, won the 2014 Victorian Premier's Literary Award.

In 2015 Alex Miller published a collection of short stories and essays drawn from forty years of writing, The Simplest Words. Peter Pierce describes this collection as "a rich, generous compilation that enticingly refracts our perceptions of one of Australia's finest novelists."

The Passage of Love, published by Allen & Unwin in 2017, was described by Michael Cathcart, when interviewing Alex Miller on ABC Radio, as "the most candid, sharing, generous book I've read in a long, long time."

Max is a work of non-fiction which tells of Alex Miller's friendship with his mentor, Max Blatt, and his search to understand Max's life. The book was published by Allen & Unwin in 2020. Writing in The Age/Sydney Morning Herald, Michael McGirr says "Max is haunted by devastating insights. Blatt told Miller that the hardest part of torture was the realisation that the torturer was also your brother. It is the same generosity that makes Max such a compelling argument against narrowness and division. Blatt's life has deep and wide ramifications. Miller's intelligent love has created a tale for the ages."

A Brief Affair, was published by Allen & Unwin in 2022.

A Kind of Confession the writer's private world, a collection of Alex Miller's journal entries and letters, collated and edited by his wife, Stephanie Miller, was published by Allen & Unwin in 2023. A Kind of Confession was short-listed for the 2024 Prime Minister's Prize for non-fiction.

The Deal, published in 2024, is Alex Miller's most recent novel. In this novel Alex Miller returns to the character Lang Tzu who appeared in 'The Ancestor Game'. Stephen Romei in 'The Saturday Paper', 12-18, 2024, quotes from the novel in his review: ' "Art," Lang tells Andy, "is striving after something beyond our reach. So we always fail. It is our longing for something that can never be ours." That pensive judgement perhaps touches on all of the topics in this wistful, bittersweet novel, written in Miller's elegant, touching prose.'

Journey to the End of Time, 2026, the third collection of Miller's work to be selected and arranged by Dr Stephanie Miller, presents stories, essays, memoirs and poems that explore the connections between Miller's art and his life. Kieran Dolin, writing in The Conversation says, 'The ethos that shines through this remarkable collection is, to quote Simone de Beauvoir, one of "devotion to individuals, to groups or to causes, [...]and to intellectual and creative work'.

== Awards ==
- 1990 Winner, the Braille Book of the Year Award for The Tivington Nott
- 1993 Winner, the Miles Franklin Award for The Ancestor Game
- 1993 Winner, the Commonwealth Writers' Prize, Overall Best Book Award for The Ancestor Game
- 1996 Shortlisted, the Miles Franklin Award for The Sitters
- 2001 Shortlisted, the Miles Franklin Award for Conditions of Faith,
- 2001 Winner, the New South Wales Premier's Literary Awards Christina Stead Prize for Fiction for Conditions of Faith
- 2003 Winner, the Miles Franklin Award for Journey to the Stone Country
- 2005 Winner, State Library of Tasmania's People's Choice Award for Journey to the Stone Country
- 2005 Shortlisted, the Tasmania Pacific Fiction Prize for Journey to the Stone Country
- 2006 Longlisted, the Miles Franklin Award for Prochownik's Dream
- 2008 Shortlisted, the Miles Franklin Award for Landscape of Farewell
- 2008 Winner, the Manning Clark House National Cultural Award for an outstanding contribution to the quality of Australian cultural life for Landscape of Farewell
- 2008 Winner, the Weishanhu Award for Best Foreign Novel in the 21st Century from the People's Literature Publishing House in China for Landscape of Farewell
- 2010 Shortlisted, the Miles Franklin Award for Lovesong
- 2010 Winner, The Age Book of the Year award for Lovesong
- 2010 Winner, The Age Fiction Prize for Lovesong
- 2010 Shortlisted, the Australian Prime Minister's Literary Award for Fiction for Lovesong
- 2011 Winner, the New South Wales Premier's Literary Awards Christina Stead Prize for Fiction for Lovesong
- 2011 Winner, the New South Wales Premier's Literary Awards, People's Choice Award for Lovesong
- 2012 Shortlisted, the Australian Prime Minister's Literary Award for Autumn Laing
- 2012 Longlisted, the Miles Franklin Award for Autumn Laing
- 2012 Winner, the Melbourne Prize for Literature
- 2014 Winner, the Victorian Premier's Literary Award for Coal Creek
- 2021 Shortlisted, the National Biography Award for Max
- 2024 Shortlisted, the Australian Prime Minister's Literary Award for Nonfiction for A Kind of Confession

Miller is a recipient of the Centenary Medal, and in 2008 the Manning Clark Medal for "An outstanding contribution to Australian cultural life." Miller is a Fellow of the Australian Academy of the Humanities.

== Bibliography ==
=== Novels ===
- Watching the Climbers on the Mountain (1988)
- The Tivington Nott (1989)
- The Ancestor Game (1992)
- The Sitters (1995)
- Conditions of Faith (2000)
- Journey to the Stone Country (2002)
- Prochownik's Dream (2005)
- Landscape of Farewell (2007)
- Lovesong (2009)
- Autumn Laing (2011)
- Coal Creek (2013)
- The Passage of Love (2017)
- A Brief Affair (2022)
- The Deal (2024)

=== Collections ===
- The Simplest Words (2015)
- A Kind of Confession (2023)
- Journey to the End of Time (2026)

=== Non-Fiction ===
- Max (2020)

=== Major short essays and short stories ===
- "Comrade Pawel", 1975, Meanjin Quarterly, No 1, Vol 34.
- "How to Kill Wild Horses", 1976, Quadrant, No 103, Vol XX, No 2.
- "The Wine Merchant of Aarhus", 1993, Kunapipi, Vol XV, No 3.
- "Inside Buckingham Palace", 1994, Brick, No 48.
- "Impressions of China", 1996, Meridian, Vol 15, No 1.
- "The Last Sister of Charity", 2000, The Age, 18 Nov.
- "Chasing My Tale", 2003, Kunapipi, Vol XV, No 3.
- "The Black Mirror", 2006, Art & Australia, Vol 43, No 3.
- "Written in Our Hearts", 2006, Thinking about Truth in Fiction and History', The Australian, 16–17 Dec.
- "Caught Behind My Imagination", 2006, The Age, Summer Age, Friday 29 Dec.
- "Salem Lodge", 2008, Meanjin Quarterly, Vol 67, No 3.
- "The Artist to Himself", 2008, Rick Amor: A Single Mind, Heide Museum of Modern Art, Australia.
- "John Masefield's Attic", 2009, Closing Address to The Flight of the Mind, Conference National Library of Australia, 25 Oct.
- "The End", 2009, Cotter, J and Williams M, (Eds), Readings and Writings, Forty Years in Books, Readings, Australia.
- "The Circle of His Art", 2011, Skovron, A, Gaita, R, and Miller, A, Singing for All He's Worth, Essays in Honour of Jacob G Rosenberg, Picador, Australia
- "Ringroad", Sonya Hartnett, Ed, 2012, The Best Australian Short Stories, Black Inc.
- "Asylum: A Secure Place of Refuge", 2013, Rosie Scott and Tom Keneally, Eds, A Country Too Far, Viking, Australia.
- "The Rule of The First Prelude", 2015, Alex Miller, The Simplest Words, Allen & Unwin, Australia.
- "The Compound", 2019, Griffith Review, No 67.

=== Drama ===
- Kitty Howard (1978), Melbourne Theatre Company
- Exiles (1981), Anthill Theatre

== Reviews ==
- Morag Fraser, 2011, 'A Space of Its Own Creation, Alex Miller's Indispensable New Novel', "Australian Book Review", , accessed 1 July 2013.
- Jem Poster, 2010, 'Lovesong by Alex Miller', "The Guardian", , accessed 1 July 2013.
- Perry Middlemiss, 2010, 'Combined Reviews: Lovesong by Alex Miller, "Matilda" , accessed 1 July 2013.
- Koval, Romona (19 November 2007). "Transcript of Radio Interview: Alex Miller's Landscape of Farewell". The Book Show, ABC Radio National.
- Geordie Williamson, 'Lovesong', 2009, The Monthly, , accessed November 2012.
- Reviews of Alex Miller's novels, accessed 1 July 2013.
- Geordie Williamson, 'Alex Miller's 'Coal Creek', September 2003, "The Monthly", , accessed November 2013.
- Brian Matthews, 'Hanging on the Cross, Alex Miller's Journey of the Imagination', October 2013, "Australian Book Review", , accessed November 2013.
- Anthony Lynch, "Real Men Roll Their Own", "Coal Creek" by Alex Miller, 14 March 2014, Sydney Review of Books, , accessed 11 August 2014.
- Nasrullah, Dimitri (17 July 2014). "Coal Creek by Alex Miller: review". The Toronto Star. Archived from the original on 12 August 2014.
- Brenda Walker, 'Brenda Walker Reviews 'The Simplest Words', March 2016, no 379, "Australian Book Review", accessed 30 December 2016.
- The Simplest Words: A Storyteller's Journey is perhaps a frame for each of these parts of Alex Miller — the artist and thinker — to meet and wander beside one another in contemplative conversation. Niki Tulk, 'Between Two Dreamings', Antipodes, 16 Aug 2019.
- Kirkus Reviews, 'A rich addition to the growing shelf of autofiction from a seasoned storyteller', 18 June 2018.
- Bridget Delaney, 'Alex Miller evokes lost Melbourne and past loves in 'private and personal' novel', The Guardian, 13 Dec 2017.
- Joseph Cummins, 'Max by Alex Miller review - a compelling and tender story of one man's hidden history', The Guardian, 30 October 2020.
- Stephen Romei, 'A Brief Affair With Lasting Consequences', The Weekend Australian, 5 November 2022.
- Brigid Rooney, 'In A Kind of Confession, Alex Miller drops the 'mask of fiction', to reveal the intricate depths of a writing life', The Conversation, 12 December 2023.
- Michael McGirr, 'Quietly Powerful Novel Reveals the Presence of a Master', The Age/Sydney Morning Herald, 23 December 2024.
- Kieran Dolin, 'In Journey to the End of Time, Alex Miller contemplates the mysterious gift of story', The Conversation, 27 April, 2026.

== Interviews ==
- Jonathan Pearlman, 'Australia's treatment of refugees is 'cruel and mean-spirited', The Telegraph, 26 December 2013,, accessed January 2014.
- Oliver Milman, 'Novelist Alex Miller attacks Australia's 'cruel and inhumane' refugee treatment', The Guardian, 27 December 2013, , accessed January 2014.
- Sullivan, Jane (5 October 2013). "Interview: Alex Miller". The Sydney Morning Herald.
- Michael Cathcart, ABC Radio,'Alex Miller on 'The Passage of Love', 14 November 2017,
- Steger, Jason (16 October 2020). "I can't keep going forever: Has Alex Miller given us his last story?". The Sydney Morning Herald.
- Sian Cain, 'I'd much rather be in Paul Keating's club than Tony Abbott's, thank you', The Guardian, 30 November 2023.

== Critical works on Alex Miller ==
- Robert Dixon, Ed, 2012, The Novels of Alex Miller, An Introduction, Allen & Unwin, Sydney.
- Robert Dixon, 2014, Alex Miller: the ruin of time, Sydney University Press, Sydney.
- Nicholas Birns, 2015, 'Failing to Be Separate: Race, Land, Concern', in Contemporary Australian Literature, Sydney Studies in Australian Literature, Sydney University Press, pp 121–155.
- Joseph Cummins, 2019, 'Sound and Silence: Listening and Relation in the Novels of Alex Miller', in The 'Imagined Sound' of Australian Literature and Music, Anthem Press, London, pp 65–82.
