= The Simplest Words =

Book by Alex Miller

The Simplest Words, A Storyteller's Journey
- First edition
- Author: Alex Miller
- Language: English
- Publisher: Allen & Unwin, Australia
- Publication date: 2015
- Publication place: Australia
- Media type: Print(Hardback)
- Pages: 356 pp
- ISBN: 978-1-74331-357-2
- Preceded by: Coal Creek
- Followed by: The Passage of Love

The Simplest Words is a 2015 collection of short stories and essays by the Australian author Alex Miller.

Peter Pierce describes this collection as 'a rich, generous compilation that enticingly refracts our perceptions of one of Australia's finest novelists'.
