= Coal Creek (novel) =

Book by Alex Miller

- First edition
- Author: Alex Miller
- Language: English
- Publisher: Allen & Unwin, Australia
- Publication date: 2013
- Publication place: Australia
- Media type: Print (Paperback)
- Pages: 291 pp
- ISBN: 978-1-74331-698-6
- Preceded by: Autumn Laing
- Followed by: The Passage of Love

Coal Creek is a 2013 novel by the Australian author Alex Miller.

== Synopsis ==
In the 1950s in Queensland's Stone Country the orphaned Robert Blewitt (nicknamed "Bobby Blue") works as a deputy for the local constable, Daniel Collins. Bobby boards with the Collins's and falls for their young daughter. But he comes into conflict with the constable when his oldest friend Ben Tobin gets into trouble.

== Reception ==
Writing in The Monthly Geordie Williamson noted: "To follow Alex Miller once again into the stone country of Central Queensland, a landscape sacred in the author’s memory and an essential site for his fiction, is to watch a self return to its wellsprings, and not only in terms of place...Miller's voice is never more pure or lovely than when he channels it through an instrument as artless as Bobby. Some will complain that Coal Creek is only as complex as the words in which it is expressed, but I disagree. The intelligence of the author haunts the novel, like an atmosphere: a “colouring of the air”, writes Proust, like 'the bloom on a grape'."

In the Australian Book Review Brian Matthews wrote: "Coal Creek is a beautifully managed novel. The almost unbearably harrowing climactic sequence – laden with the inevitability Bobby has long feared for himself, Ben Tobin, and the Collins family – is followed by a tender 'dying fall' in which, however, there is no mitigation of grim reality or wrenching loss. 'We all hang on the cross, Bobby Blue,' his mother had told him, and, in one way or another, they all do."

== Awards ==
- 2014 Prime Minister's Literary Awards — Fiction, shortlisted
- 2014 Victorian Premier's Prize for Fiction, winner

== See also ==
- Jane Sullivan interviewed the author about the book in 2013
- 2013 in Australian literature
