= The Labyrinth (Lohrey novel) =

Novel by Australian writer Amanda Lohrey

- Author: Amanda Lohrey
- Language: English
- Genre: Fiction
- Publisher: Text Publishing
- Publication date: 2020
- Publication place: Australia
- Media type: Print
- Pages: 256 pp
- Preceded by: A Short History of Richard Kline

The Labyrinth (2020) is a novel by Australian writer Amanda Lohrey.

It won the 2021 Miles Franklin Award, the 2021 Voss Literary Prize, and the 2021 Prime Minister's Literary Award for Fiction.

== Abstract ==
"Erica Marsden’s son, an artist, has been imprisoned for homicidal negligence. In a state of grief, Erica cuts off all ties to family and friends, and retreats to a quiet hamlet on the south-east coast near the prison where he is serving his sentence.

"There, in a rundown shack, she obsesses over creating a labyrinth by the ocean. To build it—to find a way out of her quandary—Erica will need the help of strangers. And that will require her to trust, and to reckon with her past.

"The Labyrinth is a hypnotic story of guilt and denial, of the fraught relationship between parents and children, that is also a meditation on how art can both be ruthlessly destructive and restore sanity. It shows Amanda Lohrey to be at the peak of her powers." (Publication summary)

== Critical reception ==
Linda Godfrey, in The Newtown Review of Books, noted: "The subtitle of the book is ‘a pastoral’, indicating that Erica is moving to the country to seek a simpler life. Though we don't know what her recent life in the city was like, she carries with her a history that she hopes to assuage by living in a small town, close to nature, and building her labyrinth."

In The Guardian, Jen Webb wrote: "A labyrinth is a powerful trope, and here it drives not only the narrative and Erica herself, but also a range of possibilities of meaning for the various characters with whom her life becomes intertwined. Though she had intended to isolate herself, the forces of kindness capture her and, gradually, she connects with those around her."

Morag Fraser, reviewing the novel for the Australian Book Review, noted that Liberty introduced fundamental patterns both in nature and in family life. Whereas the novel clearly has a story — Erica builds a labyrinth and recruits a stonemason, Yurko, to help her — Lohrey does not pass judgements, presenting Erica as an observer and learner, and most characters as open.

== See also ==
- 2020 in Australian literature
