= A Brief Affair =

A Brief Affair may refer to:

- A Brief Affair (novel), a 2022 novel by Alex Miller
- A Brief Affair (film), a 2025 Italian film
