= Poster (disambiguation) =

A poster is a piece of printed paper designed to be attached to a wall or vertical surface

Poster may also refer to:

- Poster (surname)
- Mount Poster, Antarctic mountain
- The Poster, British magazine 1898-1900

== See also ==
- Posta (disambiguation)
