= The Ancestor Game =

1992 Australian novel by Alex Miller

- First edition
- Author: Alex Miller
- Language: English
- Publisher: Penguin
- Publication date: 1992
- Publication place: Australia
- Media type: Paperback
- Pages: 302 pp
- ISBN: 0-14-015987-8
- OCLC: 27488276
- Preceded by: The Tivington Nott
- Followed by: The Sitters

The Ancestor Game is a 1992 Miles Franklin literary award-winning novel by the Australian author Alex Miller.

== Abstract ==
Writer Steven Muir, August Spiess and his daughter Gertrude, work together to understand the puzzle of Lang Tzu, an exiled Chinese artist from a wealthy family. The novel explores the themes of cultural displacement, the role of the migrant in modern Australia and race relations.

== Critical reception ==
In The Australian Book Review, Sophie Masson stated: "Alex Miller’s third novel treads some complex and difficult territory, staking out the past, memory, and the creation of self. It is also an incursion into the shadowy borderlands that lie between history and fiction, and the way in which, for every individual, the past has a different face. It is a very modern novel, in its rejection of the linear certitudes of an earlier age, and a very Australian one, too, in its ambivalence towards ancestry and individuality. In a most immediate way, ‘Australia’ is a created thing, a fiction shaped by nineteenth-century notions of the individual, in conflict with the more elemental notions of ancestry."

Peter Davis, in The Canberra Times, noted: "The Ancestor Game is like a game of three-dimensional chess played on a series of layered mirrors. Miller's extraordinary attention to detail allows us to not just see his characters but to imagine them in the past, present and future. We traverse the fear and chaos of the Victorian goldfields where transience, solitude and a desperate clinging to notions of what Australia could be help shape the destiny of Lang Tsu. We observe a frenetic hope in Shanghai and the embracing of the new world. And we peep through the half-closed shutters that cast shadows on the mystic traditions of ancient China."

== Publication history ==
After the novel's initial publication by Penguin in Australia in 1992 it was republished as follows:

- Graywolf Press, USA, 1993
- Allen & Unwin, Australia, 2000
- Allen & Unwin, Australia, 2003
- Allen & Unwin, Australia, 2016

It was also translated into Chinese in 1995, and Bulgarian in 2012.

== Awards ==
- 1993 Winner Miles Franklin Literary Award
- 1993 Winner Overall Best Book Award Commonwealth Writers Prize
- 1993 Shortlisted NBC Banjo Awards, NBC Banjo Award for Fiction
- 1992 Joint Winner FAW Barbara Ramsden Award for the Book of the Year
