= The Wing of Night =

2005 novel by Brenda Walker

- First edition
- Author: Brenda Walker
- Language: English
- Genre: Novel
- Publisher: Viking Press, Australia
- Publication date: 2005
- Publication place: Australia
- Media type: Print (Paperback)
- Pages: 265 pp
- ISBN: 0-670-89323-4
- OCLC: 63691408

The Wing of Night is a 2005 novel by Australian author Brenda Walker.

== Notes ==
- "Dedication: For Tom"
- Epigraph: "My own taste has always been for unwritten history and my present business is with the reverse of the picture." Henry James.

== Awards ==
- Waverley Library Award for Literature, The Alex Buzo Shortlist Prize, 2006: winner
- Miles Franklin Literary Award, 2006: shortlisted
- New South Wales Premier's Literary Awards, Christina Stead Prize for Fiction, 2006: shortlisted
- Nita Kibble Literary Award, 2006: winner
- Asher Literary Award, 2007: winner

== Reviews ==
- "Australian Book Review"
- "Writer's Radio"

== Interview ==
- Sullivan, Jane (27 August 2005). "War's empty spaces". The Age.
