= After China =

1992 novel by Brian Castro

- Author: Brian Castro
- Language: English
- Publisher: Allen & Unwin
- Publication date: 1992
- Publication place: Australia
- Media type: Print (Paperback)
- Pages: 145
- ISBN: 1863732438
- Preceded by: Double-Wolf
- Followed by: Drift

After China is a 1992 novel by Australian novelist Brian Castro.

== Plot summary ==
Mr You, an ex-patriate Chinese architect, has designed a strange labyrinthine hotel overlooking the ocean. While holidaying in the completed structure he meets a woman on a beach who is dying of cancer. He finds himself drawn to the woman and spins her tales of an ancient China that never existed.

== Reviews ==
- The Canberra Times

== Awards and nominations ==
- 1993 winner Victorian Premier's Literary Awards — The Vance Palmer Prize for Fiction
- 1993 shortlisted NBC Banjo Awards — NBC Banjo Award for Fiction
- 1993 shortlisted Miles Franklin Award
