= Lexi Freiman =

Australian writer

Lexi Freiman (born c. 1983) is an Australian writer known for her novels Inappropriation (2018) and The Book of Ayn (2023).

== Early life and education ==
Freiman was born circa 1983 and is of Jewish Hungarian descent. Her mother was a psychotherapist, and her father was a gastroenterologist.

In 2012, she received a Master of Fine Arts from Columbia University.

== Career ==
In the 2000s, after drama school, Freiman traveled with Australia's Bell Shakespeare Company. Later, she became an editor with George Braziller, and Persea Books.

In 2013, Freiman was an Emerging Writer Fellow with The Center for Fiction.

Her first novel, Inappropriation, was published in 2018 by Ecco Press. The novel was shortlisted for the 2019 New Australian Fiction Prize and longlisted for the 2018 Center for Fiction First Novel Prize and the 2019 Miles Franklin Award.

In 2023, Catapult published Freiman's The Book of Ayn.

As of 2023, Freiman also writes for Australian television.

== Personal life ==
Although she lived in the United States for a time, Freiman returned to Australia in 2020.

== Books ==
- Inappropriation. Ecco Press. 2018. ISBN 9780062847942.
- The Book of Ayn. Catapult. 2023. ISBN 9781646221929.
