= Shankari Chandran =

Australian novelist

- Born: 1974 or 1975 (age 51–52); London, England
- Education: University of New South Wales
- Occupation: Novelist
- Writing career
- Notable awards: Miles Franklin Award; 2023 Chai Time at Cinnamon Gardens – winner

Shankari Chandran (born 1974/75) is a British-Australian novelist. She won the 2023 Miles Franklin Award with her third novel, Chai Time at Cinnamon Gardens.

== Career ==
Chandran was born in London in 1974/75, then grew up in Canberra. Her parents were Tamil refugees from Sri Lanka. She studied law at the University of New South Wales, then worked as a human rights lawyer in London.

Her first novel, Song of the Sun God, was published in Sri Lanka in January 2017 and was longlisted for the 2019 International Dublin Literary Award. It was published in Australia in November 2022 by Ultimo Press. Charithra Chandran was given the lead role in a six-part adaptation, also named Song of the Sun God.

Her second novel, The Barrier, was published in Australia in June 2017. It was a finalist for the Norma K. Hemming Award for a Long Work of science fiction as an "exploration of themes of race, gender, class and sexuality in science fiction produced either in Australia or by Australian citizens".

She followed up with Chai Time at Cinnamon Gardens in 2022. It won the 2023 Miles Franklin Award and was longlisted for the Best Designed Commercial Fiction Cover at the 2023 Australian Publishers' Association Book Design Awards for Jessica Cruickshank's design.

Her fourth novel, Safe Haven, was published in May 2024 by Ultimo Press.

In addition to her novels, Chandran contributed a chapter to Another Australia : Twelve diverse writers reveal another Australia hidden behind, beneath and beside the country we think we know, and an essay, "An Archive for the Dispossessed" to the Griffith Review.

== Works ==
- Chandran, Shankari (2017). Song of the Sun God. Colombo, Sri Lanka: Perera Hussein Publishing House. ISBN 978-9-55889-728-7.
- —— (2017). The Barrier. Pan Macmillan Australia Pty Ltd. ISBN 978-1-925481-17-4.
- —— (2022). Chai Time at Cinnamon Gardens. Ultimo Press. ISBN 978-1-76115-031-9.
- —— (2024). Safe Haven. Ultimo Press. ISBN 978-1-76115-127-9.
