= Andrea Goldsmith (writer) =

Australian writer

- Born: Melbourne, Victoria, Australia
- Occupations: Writer, novelist
- Writing career
- Language: English
- Notable work: The Prosperous Thief (2002)

Andrea Goldsmith is an Australian writer and novelist, known for her 2002 novel The Prosperous Thief.

== Early life and education ==
Goldsmith was born in Melbourne, Victoria, to an Australian-Jewish family. She started learning the piano at the age of 8, and music remains an abiding passion.

== Career ==
Goldsmith initially trained as a speech pathologist and worked for several years with children suffering from severe communication impairment until becoming a full-time writer in the late 1980s.

From 1987 and through the 1990s she taught creative writing at Deakin University, and as of 2021 continues to conduct workshops and mentor new novelists.

She travels widely, and London, in particular, figures prominently in her novels. At the same time, she describes herself as 'a deeply Melbourne person'.

She also writes literary essays on topics as diverse as Oliver Sacks ("Oliver Sacks: Anthropologist of Mind"), nuclear physics, life-threatening illness ("Chain Reaction") and Jewish Australian identity ("Talmudic Excursions").

While a writer-in-residence at La Trobe University, she edited an anthology written by a group of people with gambling problems, called Calling A Spade A Spade. She conducts workshops and short courses for fiction writers and mentors new novelists.

She has been a guest at all the major literary festivals in Australia, and appeared at the 2009 Sydney Writers' Festival.

== Awards ==
- 1993 – Shortlisted, NBC Banjo Awards, NBC Lysbeth Cohen Memorial Prize Modern Interiors
- 2003 – Shortlisted, Miles Franklin Award, for The Prosperous Thief
- 2015 – Winner, Best Writing Award in the Melbourne Prize for Literature, for her 2013 novel The Memory Trap

== Personal life ==
As of 2019 Goldsmith was living in Clifton Hill, in Melbourne's inner suburbs, in a house she bought with her partner, the poet Dorothy Porter. She continued to live there following Porter's death in 2008.

== Selected works ==
=== Novels ===
- Gracious Living (Penguin, 1990)
- Modern Interiors (Penguin, 1991)
- Facing the Music (Penguin, 1994)
- Under the Knife (Penguin, 1998)
- The Prosperous Thief (Allen & Unwin, 2002)
- Reunion (Harper Collins, 2009)
- The Memory Trap (Fourth Estate, 2013)
- Invented Lives (Scribe, 2019)
- The Buried Life (Transit Lounge, 2025)
