= Poster (surname) =

Poster is a surname. Notable people with the surname include:

- Jem Poster (born 1949), British poet and novelist
- Kim Poster (born 1957), American-British theatre producer
- Mark Poster (1941–2012), American academic
- Meryl Poster, American film producer and businessperson
- Randall Poster, American music supervisor
- Ron Poster, Boston Bruins stadium organist
- Steven Poster (born 1944), American cinematographer and photographer
- Tim Poster, (born c. 1968), American entrepreneur
