= Carmel Bird =

Australian writer

Carmel Bird (born 1940) is an Australian writer of novels, short stories and essays. She has written books on the art of writing, and has edited anthologies of essays and stories. In 2016, she was awarded the Patrick White Literary Award.

== Writing career ==
Her first collection of short stories (1976) was titled Dimitra and Other Stories, and her most recent novel (2019) is Field of Poppies. In 2016 she published the novel Family Skeleton. In 2010 she published the novel Child of the Twilight. Her most recent collection of short fiction is the ebook The Dead Aviatrix (2017). My Hearts Are Your Hearts (2015) is also a collection of short fiction. Her most recent non-fiction is Fair Game (2015).

In 2016, she was awarded the Patrick White Literary Award "in recognition of her outstanding contribution to Australian literature".

== Awards and nominations ==
- 1991 — shortlisted in the Miles Franklin Award for The Bluebird Cafe
- 1991 — shortlisted in Victorian Premier's Award for The Bluebird Cafe
- 1996 — shortlisted in the Miles Franklin Award for The White Garden
- 1996 — shortlisted in the NSW Premier's Award; the Aurealis Award; the Ned Kelly Award for The White Garden
- 1998 — shortlisted in the Miles Franklin Award for Red Shoes
- 2001 — winner of the Philip Hodgins Memorial Medal at the Mildura Writer's Festival
- 2001 — film based on story 'A Telephone Call for Genevieve Snow' (director Peter Long) winner of Silver Lion, Venice Film Festival
- 2016 — winner of the Patrick White Award

== Bibliography ==
=== Novels ===
- Bird, Carmel (1985). Cherry Ripe.
- Bird, Carmel (1990). The Bluebird Café. New Directions.
- Bird, Carmel (1995). The White Garden.
- Bird, Carmel (under the name of Jack Power)l (1996). Crisis.
- Bird, Carmel (1998). Red Shoes.
- Bird, Carmel (2000). Unholy Writ.
- Bird, Carmel (2002). Open for Inspection.
- Bird, Carmel (2004). Cape Grimm.
- Bird, Carmel (2010). Child of the Twilight
- Bird, Carmel (2016). Family Skeleton
- Bird, Carmel (2019). Field of Poppies
- Bird, Carmel (2025). Crimson Velvet Heart

=== Collections ===
- Bird, Carmel (1976). Dimitra
- Bird, Carmel (1983). Births, Deaths and Marriages
- Bird, Carmel (1987). The Woodpecker Toy Fact and Other Stories.
- Bird, Carmel (1988). Woodpecker Point
- Bird, Carmel (1993). The Common Rat.
- Bird, Carmel (1996). Automatic Teller.
- Bird, Carmel (2005). The Essential Bird
- Bird, Carmel (2015). My Hearts Are Your Hearts
- Bird, Carmel (2017). The Dead Aviatrix
- Bird, Carmel (2023). Love Letter to Lola

=== Anthologies (edited) ===
- Bird, Carmel (1985). The Writing on the Wall: Collection of Poetry and Prose by Women.
- Bird, Carmel (1990). Australian Short Stories.
- Bird, Carmel (1991). Relations - Australian Short Stories.
- Bird, Carmel (1996). Red Hot Notes.
- Bird, Carmel (1997). Daughters and Fathers.
- Bird, Carmel (1998). The Stolen Children: Their Stories.
- Bird, Carmel (2000). The Penguin Century of Australian Stories.

=== Non-fiction ===
- Bird, Carmel (1988). Dear Writer.
- Bird, Carmel (1994). Not Now Jack - I'm Writing a Novel.
- Bird, Carmel (1996). Dear Writer (Revised and enlarged ed.).
- Bird, Carmel (2010). Writing the Story of Your Life
- Bird, Carmel (2013). Dear Writer Revisited
- Bird, Carmel (2015). Fair Game
- Bird, Carmel (2022). Telltale

=== Children's ===
- Bird, Carmel (1996). The Mouth.
- Bird, Carmel (1998). The Cassowary's Quiz.
- Bird, Carmel (2012). The Fabulous Finola Fox

=== Book reviews ===
Date	Review article	Work(s) reviewed
2011	Bird, Carmel (June 2011). "Graphic impact". Australian Book Review (332): 59.	Wilson, Rohan (2011). The Roving Party. Allen & Unwin.
2011	Bird, Carmel (September 2011). "Whispering death". Australian Book Review (334): 27.	Richards, Tim (2011). Thought crimes. Black Inc.
