= Journey to the Stone Country =

Novel by Australian author Alex Miller

- First edition
- Author: Alex Miller
- Language: English
- Publisher: Allen & Unwin, Australia
- Publication date: 2002
- Publication place: Australia
- Media type: Print (hardback & paperback)
- Pages: 364 pp
- ISBN: 1-86508-619-3
- OCLC: 51500273
- LC Class: PR9619.3.M469 J68 2002

Journey to the Stone Country is a 2002 Miles Franklin literary award-winning novel by the Australian author Alex Miller.

== Background ==
Miller wrote Journey to the Stone Country in 18 months and three drafts. The two protagonists, Bo and Annabelle, were based on friends of his.

Though Miller originally envisioned the novel as a love story, the book soon grew into what The Age called "a national epic," addressing themes of reconciliation between indigenous Australians and white settlers.

== Plot ==
Annabelle, a Melbourne academic, learns that her husband is leaving her for an honours student. She leaves for her family home in Townsville and takes a job with an archaeologist doing cultural surveys for mining permits. There she meets Bo Rennie, an Aboriginal stockman whom Annabelle had met during her childhood. Instantly attracted to one another, the two embark on a journey to rural Queensland to survey a dam.

== Reception ==
The Sydney Morning Herald praised the novel and Miller's "meticulous, skilful writing". The Curtin University of Technology's API Review of Books was less positive, calling the narrative "surprisingly disappointing" and some of the dialogue "uncharacteristically clumsy" for Miller. Critics and scholars were mixed on Miller's portrayal of Reconciliation, some claiming the book romanticized his indigenous characters, others citing the narrative's complexity.

== Awards ==
- Tasmania Pacific Region Prize, Tasmania Pacific Fiction Prize, 2005: shortlisted
- State Library of Tasmania People's Choice Award, 2005: winner
- Festival Awards for Literature (SA), Dymocks Booksellers Award for Fiction, 2004: shortlisted
- One Book One Brisbane, 2004: shortlisted
- New South Wales Premier's Literary Awards, Christina Stead Prize for Fiction, 2003: shortlisted
- Miles Franklin Literary Award, 2003: winner
- The Age Book of the Year Award, Fiction Prize, 2003: shortlisted
- Colin Roderick Award, 2002: shortlisted
