= Amanda Lohrey =

Australian novelist (born 1947)

- Born: Amanda Frances Lillian Howard; 13 April 1947 (age 79); Hobart, Tasmania, Australia
- Spouse: Andrew Lohrey
- Writing career
- Language: English
- Years active: 1977–present
- Notable work: Reading Madame Bovary The Labyrinth
- Notable awards: Patrick White Award; Miles Franklin Award

Amanda Frances Lillian Lohrey (née Howard; born 13 April 1947) is an Australian writer and novelist.

== Career ==
Lohrey completed her education at the University of Tasmania before taking up a scholarship at the University of Cambridge. From 1988 to 1994 she lectured in writing and textual studies at the University of Technology, Sydney. She has held the position of lecturer in School of English, Media Studies and Art History at the University of Queensland in Brisbane in 2002, and joined the Australian National University School of Literature, Languages, and Linguistics as a visiting fellow in 2016 where she continues to write fiction.

== Awards and nominations ==
- 1988 shortlisted New South Wales Premier's Literary Awards Christina Stead Prize for Fiction The Reading Group
- 1996 winner Australian Literature Society Gold Medal Camille's Bread
- 1996 winner Victorian Premier's Literary Award Vance Palmer Prize for Fiction Camille's Bread
- 1996 shortlisted Miles Franklin Award Camille's Bread
- 2005 longlisted Miles Franklin Award The Philosopher's Doll
- 2006 longlisted International Dublin Literary Award The Philosopher's Doll
- 2011 winner Queensland Premier's Literary Award Reading Madame Bovary
- 2012 Patrick White Award
- 2021 winner Miles Franklin Award The Labyrinth
- 2021 winner Voss Literary Prize, The Labyrinth
- 2021 winner Prime Minister's Literary Award for Fiction, The Labyrinth

== Bibliography ==
=== Novels ===
- The Morality of Gentlemen (1984)
- The Reading Group (1988)
- Camille's Bread (1995)
- The Philosopher's Doll (2004)
- Vertigo (2008)
- Reading Madame Bovary (2010)
- A Short History of Richard Kline (2015)
- The Labyrinth (2020)
- The Conversion (2023)
- Capture (2026)

=== Essays ===
- The Clear Voice Suddenly Singing. An essay in Secrets by Drusilla Modjeska, Amanda Lohrey, Robert Dessaix. Pan MacMillan, 1997
- The Project of the Self under Late-Capitalism. The Best Australian Essays 2001, pp. 246–65. Black Inc/Schwartz Publishing Pty Ltd
- Reading Madame Bovary. The Best Australian Stories 2002, pp. 14–39. Black Inc/Schwartz Publishing Pty Ltd
- Groundswell: The Rise of the Greens Quarterly Essay 8. 2002, pp. 1–86. Black Inc/Schwartz Publishing Pty Ltd
- Writing The Morality of Gentlemen. Hecate, Vol. 30, 2004 pp. 193–200. Hecate Press
- Enrolment Daze, The Monthly, No. 7, November 2005
- Celebrating the secular. Cultural Studies Review, Vol. 12, 2006, pp. 202–206. John Libbey & Company Pty Ltd
- Voting for Jesus, Christianity and Politics in Australia. Quarterly Essay 22. 2006. Black Inc.
- Green Christine, The Monthly, No. 31, February 2008
- A Welcome Contradiction: Gambler and MONA founder David Walsh has written a book, The Monthly, December 2014 – January 2015
