= Black Rock White City =

Novel by A. S. Patrić

- First edition
- Author: A. S. Patrić
- Language: English
- Genre: Literary fiction
- Publisher: Transit Lounge
- Publication date: 1 April 2015
- Publication place: Australia
- Media type: Print (paperback)
- Pages: 248 pp
- ISBN: 9781921924835
- Preceded by: –
- Followed by: Atlantic Black

Black Rock White City (2015) is the debut novel of Australian writer A. S. Patrić. It won the Miles Franklin Award in 2016.

== Plot ==
In the late 1990s Jovan, a writer and academic in Serbia, and his wife Suzana are refugees living in Melbourne, having fled the Yugoslav Wars. Jovan works as a cleaner at a hospital, and is tasked with cleaning up some graffiti which is followed by more vandalism that becomes ever more weird and threatening.

== Reception ==
Commenting on behalf of the Miles Franklin Award judging panel, State Library of NSW Mitchell Librarian, Richard Neville, said Black Rock White City delivers a powerful and raw account of the migrant experience in Australia, exploring the damages of war, and the possibility of redemptive love, in the context of debilitating emotional and physical dislocation.

Joanne Peulen of Booklover Book Reviews said "Black Rock White City defies typical genre categorisation, and that perhaps this is the mark of a truly great novel… with the intensity and suspense of a psychological thriller, the lyricism and universality of great literature, and the grittiness and brutality of a crime novel".

Lisa Hill of ANZLitLovers said "Black Rock White City is a stunning novel that places A.S. Patrić among the finest of our new crop of writers. His prose is uncompromising but his imagery is exquisite. He doesn’t fall back on lashings of foul language to express ferocity and violence; and his use of poetry to reveal the Jovan unseen by the people he meets, is sublime."

== Awards and nominations ==
- 2016 highly commended Victorian Premier's Literary Awards — Victorian Premier's Prize for Fiction
- 2016 winner Miles Franklin Literary Award

== See also ==
- 2015 in Australian literature
