= The Garden Book =

Book by Brian Castro

- First edition
- Author: Brian Castro
- Language: English
- Genre: Novel
- Publisher: Giramondo Publishing, Australia
- Publication date: 2005
- Publication place: Australia
- Media type: Print (Paperback)
- Pages: 316 pp
- ISBN: 1-920882-10-3
- OCLC: 224300602
- Dewey Decimal: 823/.914 22
- LC Class: PR9619.3.C3922 G37 2005
- Preceded by: Shanghai Dancing
- Followed by: The Bath Fugues

The Garden Book is a 2005 novel by Australian author Brian Castro.

== Epigraph ==
O where is the garden of Being that is only known in Existence
As the command to be never there, the sentence by which
Alephs of throbbing fact have been banished into position,
The clock that dismisses the moment into the turbine of time?
(W. H. Auden, "For the Time Being")

Writing letters, however, means to denude oneself before the ghosts, something for which they greedily wait. Written kisses don't reach their destination, rather they are drunk on the way by the ghosts. It is on this ample nourishment that they multiply so enormously. Humanity senses this and fights against it and in order to eliminate as far as possible the ghostly element between people and to create a natural communication, the peace of souls, it has invented the railway, the motor car, the areoplane. But it's no longer any good, these are evidently inventions being made at the moment of crashing. The opposing side is so much calmer and stronger; after the postal service it has invented the telegraph, the telephone, the radiograph. The ghosts won't starve, but we will perish.
(Franz Kafka, "Letter to Milena Jesenská")

== Awards ==
- Miles Franklin Literary Award, 2006: shortlisted
- Queensland Premier's Literary Awards, Best Fiction Book, 2006: winner
- International Dublin Literary Award, 2007: longlisted

== Reviews ==
- "The Age"
- "API Review of Books"
