= A. S. Patrić =

Australian writer

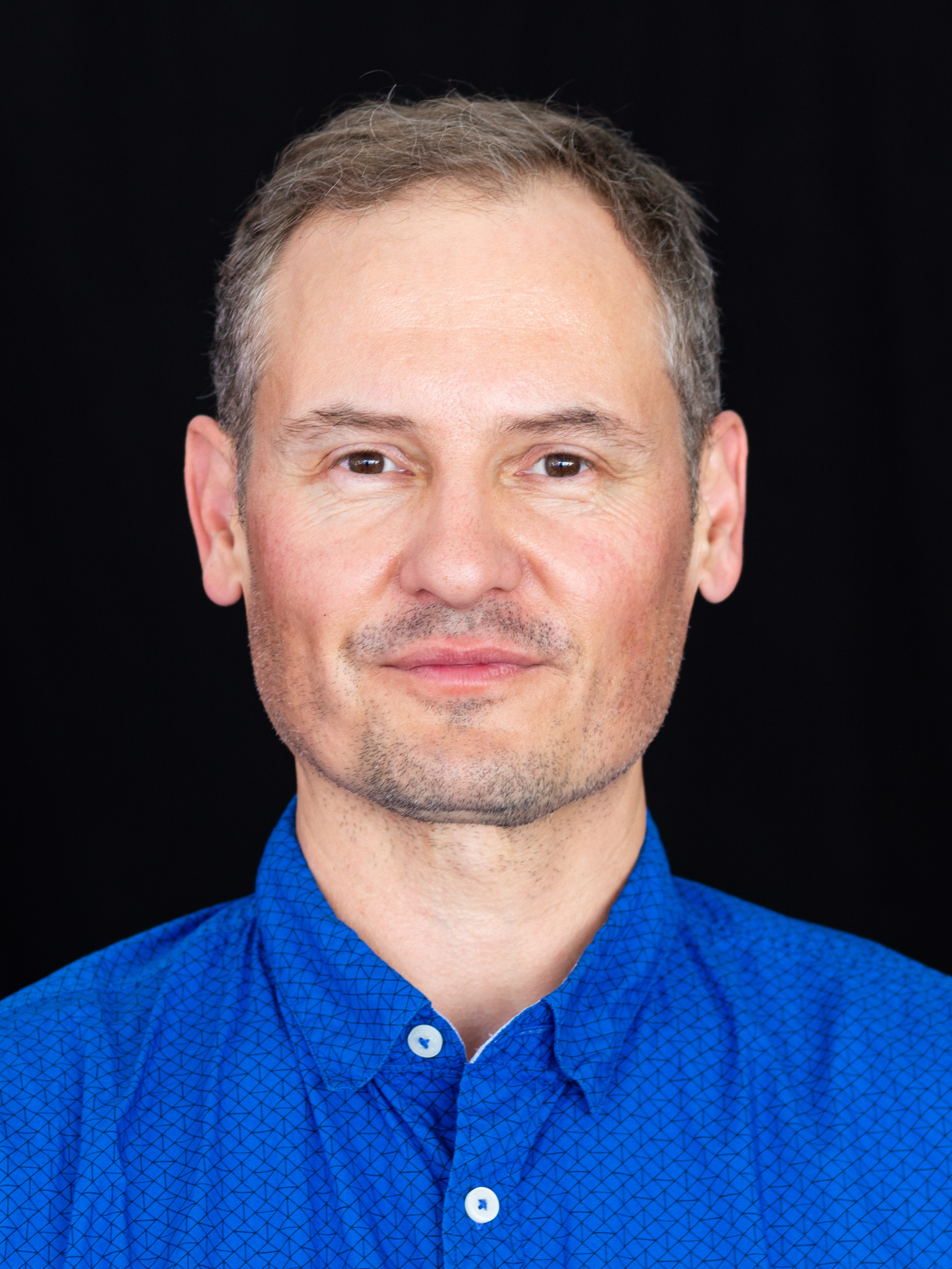
- Patrić at Perth Festival Writers Week in 2019
- Born: Alec Patrić; Zemun, Serbia
- Occupations: Novelist and short story writer
- Writing career
- Language: English
- Years active: 2009–present
- Notable work: Black Rock White City
- Notable awards: Miles Franklin Award 2016

A. S. Patrić, known as Alec Patric, is an Australian novelist and short story writer.

== Early life ==
Alec Patrić was born in Zemun, Serbia, and migrated to Australia with his family when he was still a child.

== Career ==
Patrić won the 2016 Miles Franklin Award for his debut novel Black Rock White City.

He lectures in creative writing at the University of Melbourne and is also a bookseller in St Kilda, Victoria.

== Bibliography ==
=== Novels ===
- Black Rock White City (2015)
- Atlantic Black (2017)

=== Short story collections ===
- The Rattler and Other Stories (2011)
- Las Vegas for Vegans (2012)
- Bruno Kramzer: A Long Story (2013)
- The Butcherbird Stories (2018)
