= Dark as Last Night =

2021 short story collection by Australian author Tony Birch

- Author: Tony Birch
- Language: English
- Genre: Short story collection
- Publisher: University of Queensland Press
- Publication date: 3 August 2021
- Publication place: Australia
- Media type: Print
- Pages: 219 pp.
- Awards: 2022 New South Wales Premier's Literary Awards — Christina Stead Prize for Fiction, winner
- ISBN: 9780702263170

Dark as Last Night is a 2021 short story collection by the Australian author Tony Birch originally published by University of Queensland Press.

It was the winner of the 2022 New South Wales Premier's Literary Awards, Christina Stead Prize for Fiction.

The collection consists of 15 stories, all published here for the first time.

== Contents ==
- "Dark as Last Night"
- "After Life"
- "Bobby Moses"
- "Bicycle Thieves"
- "Probate"
- "Starman"
- "The Blood Bank : A Love Story"
- "The Death of Michael McGuire"
- "The Manger"
- "Together"
- "The Librarian"
- "Animal Welfare"
- "Flight"
- "Without Sin"
- "Lemonade"
- "Riding Trains with Thelma Plum"

== Critical reception ==
Joseph Cummins calls Birch a "master of the short story" in his review of the collection in The Guardian. He commented: "Tony Birch's short stories are precious gems. Written in a deceptively simple prose, the pages of Dark as Last Night capture the humanity, courage and humour of characters in the midst of life."

In Timmah Ball's review of this collection for Sydney Review of Books, she recontextualises Cummins' praise, stating "For me Birch is not the master of the short story but rather uniquely equipped, as Whittaker puts it, to tell a brilliant yarn, in any form – academic articles, narrative non-fiction, essays, lectures, novels or poetry – all of which fall into western categories that increasingly feel limited." This idea of 'uniquely equipped' that Ball refers to comes from a moment in Alison Whittaker's lecture at the Sydney Writers Festival in the heat of covid, which Ball quotes: "It is a cliché by now for sure but Indigenous peoples are uniquely equipped to address this theme for you. We have lived an apocalypse or in some kind of apocalyptic state for some two and half centuries now." https://sydneyreviewofbooks.com/reviews/reading-dark-as-last-night-in-a-pandemic

In Australian Book Review Anthony Lynch noted that, as with the author's previous collection, this book "contains an abundance of sad stories, but with grief and trauma ameliorated by the main protagonist's affection for at least one other character, be it a family member or neighbour." And while he then went on to say: "These vivid, empathetic realist stories, untouched by postmodernism, make few demands on the reader in regard to style, plot, or character motivation", he does conclude that these are "stories that stay with us".

== See also ==
- 2021 in Australian literature

== Notes ==
- Dedication: For Charlie Atticus Burke — arrived in the world on 27 November 2020 — a cousin for Isabel Kit and Archie James.

== Awards ==
- 2022 New South Wales Premier's Literary Awards – Christina Stead Prize for Fiction, winner
- 2022 Prime Minister's Literary Awards – Fiction, shortlisted
