= Eureka Street (magazine) =

Eureka Street is an Australian magazine concerned with public affairs, arts, and theology. Founded in 1991, the magazine was published in print format for 15 years before becoming an online-only magazine in 2006.

The magazine is part of Jesuit Communications, the communications arm of the Australian Jesuit Province. However, the magazine has a tradition of being strongly secular and inclusive.

Morag Fraser was editor of Eureka Street from 1991 till 2003. Tim Kroenert held the position until early 2020, when David Halliday became editor, alongside editorial consultant Andrew Hamilton.

== Writers ==
Writers published in the magazine have included Margaret Simons, Peter Roebuck, Brett McBean, Frank Brennan, Gregory O'Kelly, Clive Hamilton, Susan Crennan and Stuart Macintyre.
