= Miles Franklin Award =

Australian literature award

Miles Franklin Literary Award
- Awarded for: a novel which is of the highest literary merit and presents Australian life in any of its phases
- Sponsored by: Estate of Miles Franklin
- Location: Australia
- First award: 1957
- Website: Miles Franklin Award

The Miles Franklin Literary Award is an annual literary prize awarded to "a novel which is of the highest literary merit and presents Australian life in any of its phases". The award was set up according to the will of Miles Franklin (1879–1954), who is best known for writing the Australian classic My Brilliant Career (1901). She bequeathed her estate to fund this award. As of 2025, the award is valued at A$60,000.

== Winners, old dating convention ==
The prize originally took its date from the year in which eligible novels were published, ignoring the fact that it was not awarded until the following year.

=== 1957–1959 ===
Year	Author	Title	Publisher	Ref
1957	Patrick White	Voss	Eyre and Spottiswoode	
1958	Randolph Stow	To the Islands	Macdonald	
1959	Vance Palmer	The Big Fellow	Angus and Robertson	

=== 1960–1969 ===
Year	Author	Title	Publisher	Ref
1960	Elizabeth O'Conner	The Irishman	Angus and Robertson	
1961	Patrick White	Riders in the Chariot	Eyre and Spottiswoode	
1962	Thea Astley	The Well Dressed Explorer	Angus and Robertson	
1962	George Turner	The Cupboard Under the Stairs	Cassell	
1963	Sumner Locke Elliott	Careful, He Might Hear You	Harper and Row	
1964	George Johnston	My Brother Jack	Collins	
1965	Thea Astley	The Slow Natives	Angus and Robertson	
1966	Peter Mathers	Trap	Cassell	
1967	Thomas Keneally	Bring Larks and Heroes	Cassell	
1968	Thomas Keneally	Three Cheers for the Paraclete	Angus and Robertson	
1969	George Johnston	Clean Straw for Nothing	Collins	

=== 1970–1979 ===
Year	Author	Title	Publisher	Ref
1970	Dal Stivens	A Horse of Air	Angus and Robertson	
1971	David Ireland	The Unknown Industrial Prisoner	Angus and Robertson	
1972	Thea Astley	The Acolyte	Angus and Robertson	
1973	Award withheld after the judges decided that none of the novels entered was good enough			
1974	Ronald McKie	The Mango Tree	Collins	
1975	Xavier Herbert	Poor Fellow My Country	Fontana Books	
1976	David Ireland	The Glass Canoe	Macmillan	
1977	Ruth Park	Swords and Crowns and Rings	Nelson Books	
1978	Jessica Anderson	Tirra Lirra by the River	Macmillan	
1979	David Ireland	A Woman of the Future	Penguin Books	

=== 1980–1987 ===
Year	Author	Title	Publisher	Ref
1980	Jessica Anderson	The Impersonators	Macmillan	
1981	Peter Carey	Bliss	Faber and Faber	
1982	Rodney Hall	Just Relations	Penguin Books	
1983	Award withheld after the judges decided that none of the novels entered was good enough			
1984	Tim Winton	Shallows	Allen and Unwin	
1985	Christopher Koch	The Doubleman	Chatto and Windus	
1986	Elizabeth Jolley	The Well	Viking Press	
1987	Glenda Adams	Dancing on Coral	Viking Press	

== Winners, new dating convention ==
The prize is still for the best novel published during the preceding year, but now bears the date of the year in which it is awarded. While the change meant there was no prize called "1988", there is no break in the annual series. The award for novels published in 1987 was announced on 10 May 1988 as the "1987" prize (won by Glenda Adams), and the award for novels published in 1988 was announced on 25 July 1989 as the "1989" prize (won by Peter Carey).

=== 1989 ===
Year	Author	Title	Publisher	Ref
1989	Peter Carey	Oscar and Lucinda	University of Queensland Press	

=== 1990–1999 ===
Year	Author	Title	Publisher	Ref
1990	Tom Flood	Oceana Fine	Allen and Unwin	
1991	David Malouf	The Great World	Chatto and Windus	
1992	Tim Winton	Cloudstreet	Penguin Books	
1993	Alex Miller	The Ancestor Game	Penguin Books	
1994	Rodney Hall	The Grisly Wife	Macmillan	
1995	Helen Demidenko	The Hand That Signed the Paper	Allen and Unwin	
1996	Christopher Koch	Highways to a War	Heinemann	
1997	David Foster	The Glade Within the Grove	Vintage	
1998	Peter Carey	Jack Maggs	University of Queensland Press	
1999	Murray Bail	Eucalyptus	Random House	

=== 2000–2009 ===
Year	Author	Title	Publisher	Ref
2000	Thea Astley	Drylands	Penguin Books	
2000	Kim Scott	Benang	Fremantle Press	
2001	Frank Moorhouse	Dark Palace	Knopf	
2002	Tim Winton	Dirt Music	Picador	
2003	Alex Miller	Journey to the Stone Country	Allen and Unwin	
2004	Shirley Hazzard	The Great Fire	Farrar, Straus and Giroux	
2005	Andrew McGahan	The White Earth	Allen and Unwin	
2006	Roger McDonald	The Ballad of Desmond Kale	Vintage	
2007	Alexis Wright	Carpentaria	Giramondo	
2008	Steven Carroll	The Time We Have Taken	Fourth Estate	
2009	Tim Winton	Breath	Hamish Hamilton	

=== 2010–2019 ===
Year	Author	Title	Publisher	Ref
2010	Peter Temple	Truth	Text Publishing	
2011	Kim Scott	That Deadman Dance	Picador	
2012	Anna Funder	All That I Am	Hamish Hamilton	
2013	Michelle de Kretser	Questions of Travel	Allen and Unwin	
2014	Evie Wyld	All the Birds, Singing	Random House	
2015	Sofie Laguna	The Eye of the Sheep	Allen and Unwin	
2016	A. S. Patrić	Black Rock White City	Transit Lounge	
2017	Josephine Wilson	Extinctions	UWA Publishing	
2018	Michelle de Kretser	The Life to Come	Allen and Unwin	
2019	Melissa Lucashenko	Too Much Lip	University of Queensland Press	

=== 2020– ===
Year	Author	Title	Publisher	Ref
2020	Tara June Winch	The Yield	Penguin Random House	
2021	Amanda Lohrey	The Labyrinth	Text Publishing	
2022	Jennifer Down	Bodies of Light	Text Publishing	
2023	Shankari Chandran	Chai Time at Cinnamon Gardens	Ultimo Press	
2024	Alexis Wright	Praiseworthy	Giramondo	
2025	Siang Lu	Ghost Cities	University of Queensland Press	
2026	Omar Musa	Fierceland	Penguin Random House	

== Controversies ==
Author Frank Moorhouse was disqualified from consideration for his novel Grand Days because the story was set in Europe during the 1920s and was not sufficiently Australian.

1995 winner Helen Darville, also known as Helen Demidenko and Helen Dale, won for The Hand That Signed the Paper and sparked a debate about authenticity in Australian literature. Darville claimed to be of Ukrainian descent and said it was fiction based on family history. Writer David Marr, who presented the award to her, said that revelations about her true background did not "alter a single thing about the quality of the story, it knocks completely out of the water her answers to critics who said it was not historically accurate, that she knows because of direct family experience, which appears to be complete bull----."

Even before the hoax was revealed, Darville’s book was considered anti-Semitic and justified the genocide of Jewish people. It was also later revealed that she plagiarised from multiple sources.

In 2004, three judges resigned due to what they viewed as the commodification of the awards.

2022 longlisted writer John Hughes was accused of plagiarising significant sections of his 2021 book The Dogs from Nobel Laureate Svetlana Alexievich's nonfiction book The Unwomanly Face of War. Nearly 60 similarities and identical sentences were found in a comparison of Hughes' novel and the English version of Alexievich's book. The Guardian newspaper also found similarities between incidents described in the books, including the central scene from which The Dogs takes its title. Further investigation found other examples of plagiarism in the novel and that Hughes copied sections of classic texts including The Great Gatsby and Anna Karenina without acknowledging the original source. The book was subsequently withdrawn from competition.

The Stella Prize was created in 2013 as a reaction to the supposed under-representation of women as winners of literary prizes, in particular the 2011 Miles Franklin Award shortlist. However, since 2013, only three men have won the Miles Franklin Award.

== Repeat winners ==
- (4) Thea Astley: 1962, 1965, 1972, 2000
- (4) Tim Winton: 1984, 1992, 2002, 2009
- (3) Peter Carey: 1981, 1989, 1998
- (3) David Ireland: 1971, 1976, 1979
- (2) Jessica Anderson: 1978, 1980
- (2) Rodney Hall: 1982, 1994
- (2) Thomas Keneally: 1967, 1968
- (2) Michelle de Kretser: 2013, 2018
- (2) George Johnston: 1964, 1969
- (2) Christopher Koch: 1985, 1996
- (2) Alex Miller: 1993, 2003
- (2) Kim Scott: 2000, 2011
- (2) Patrick White: 1957, 1961
- (2) Alexis Wright: 2007, 2024

== Nominated works ==
Shortlisted titles are only shown for the years 1987 onwards. No record has yet been found for any shortlists being released prior to that year. Longlisted titles are only shown for the years 2005 onwards. That was the first year that such a list was released by the judging panel. The number of works included on the longlist varies from year to year.

=== 1980s ===
In 1989, the date by which the prize is identified changed from the year of publication to the year of announcement. While there was no award called "1988", there is no break in the annual series (see above).

Miles Franklin Award honorees (1987–1989)
Year	Author	Title	Result
1987 for novels published in 1987, announced in 1988	Glenda Adams	Dancing on Coral	Winner
1987 for novels published in 1987, announced in 1988	Murray Bail	Holden's Performance	Shortlist
1987 for novels published in 1987, announced in 1988	Nicholas Hasluck	Truant State	Shortlist
1987 for novels published in 1987, announced in 1988	David Ireland	Bloodfather	Shortlist
1987 for novels published in 1987, announced in 1988	Nancy Phelan	Home Is the Sailor	Shortlist
1989 for novels published in 1988, announced in 1989	Peter Carey	Oscar and Lucinda	Winner
1989 for novels published in 1988, announced in 1989	Rodney Hall	Captivity Captive	Shortlist
1989 for novels published in 1988, announced in 1989	Mark Henshaw	Out of the Line of Fire	Shortlist
1989 for novels published in 1988, announced in 1989	David Parker	Building on Sand	Shortlist
1989 for novels published in 1988, announced in 1989	Janette Turner Hospital	Charades	Shortlist

=== 1990s ===
Miles Franklin Award honorees (1990–1999)
Year	Author	Title	Result
1990	Tom Flood	Oceana Fine	Winner
1990	Janine Burke	Company of Images	Shortlist
1990	Nicholas Jose	Avenue of Eternal Peace	Shortlist
1990	Amy Witting	I for Isobel	Shortlist
1990	Peter Goldsworthy	Maestro	Shortlist
1990	Tony Maniaty	Smyrna	Shortlist
1991	David Malouf	The Great World	Winner
1991	Glenda Adams	Longleg	Shortlist
1991	Thea Astley	Reaching Tin River	Shortlist
1991	Jessica Anderson	Taking Shelter	Shortlist
1991	Carmel Bird	The Bluebird Café	Shortlist
1991	Nicholas Hasluck	The Country Without Music	Shortlist
1992	Tim Winton	Cloudstreet	Winner
1992	Brian Castro	Double-Wolf	Shortlist
1992	Robert Drewe	Our Sunshine	Shortlist
1992	Rodney Hall	The Second Bridegroom	Shortlist
1992	Alan Gould	To the Burning City	Shortlist
1993	Alex Miller	The Ancestor Game	Winner
1993	Brian Castro	After China	Shortlist
1993	Helen Garner	Cosmo Cosmolino	Shortlist
1993	Roger McDonald	Shearers' Motel	Shortlist
1993	Janette Turner Hospital	The Last Magician	Shortlist
1993	Thea Astley	Vanishing Points	Shortlist
1994	Rodney Hall	The Grisly Wife	Winner
1994	David Malouf	Remembering Babylon	Shortlist
1994	Roger McDonald	Water Man	Shortlist
1995	Helen Demidenko	The Hand That Signed the Paper	Winner
1995	Jay Verney	A Mortality Tale	Shortlist
1995	Kate Grenville	Dark Places	Shortlist
1995	Richard Flanagan	Death of a River Guide	Shortlist
1996	Christopher Koch	Highways to a War	Winner
1996	Judith Fox	Bracelet Honeymyrtle	Shortlist
1996	Amanda Lohrey	Camille's Bread	Shortlist
1996	Beverley Farmer	The House in the Light	Shortlist
1996	Alex Miller	The Sitters	Shortlist
1996	Paul Horsfall	The Touchstone	Shortlist
1996	Carmel Bird	The White Garden	Shortlist
1997	David Foster	The Glade Within the Grove	Winner
1997	John Scott	Before I Wake	Shortlist
1997	Robert Dessaix	Night Letters	Shortlist
1997	Janette Turner Hospital	Oyster	Shortlist
1997	David Malouf	The Conversations at Curlow Creek	Shortlist
1997	Robert Drewe	The Drowner	Shortlist
1997	Thea Astley	The Multiple Effects of Rainshadow	Shortlist
1998	Peter Carey	Jack Maggs	Winner
1998	Elizabeth Jolley	Lovesong	Shortlist
1998	Rod Jones	Nightpictures	Shortlist
1998	Dorothy Johnston	One for the Master	Shortlist
1998	Delia Falconer	The Service of Clouds	Shortlist
1998	Richard Flanagan	The Sound of One Hand Clapping	Shortlist
1998	James Bradley	Wrack	Shortlist
1999	Murray Bail	Eucalyptus	Winner
1999	Roger McDonald	Mr Darwin's Shooter	Shortlist
1999	Carmel Bird	Red Shoes	Shortlist
1999	Marion Halligan	The Golden Dress	Shortlist
1999	Elliot Perlman	Three Dollars	Shortlist

=== 2000s ===
Miles Franklin Award winners 2000–2009
Year	Author	Title	Result
2000	Thea Astley	Drylands	Winner
2000	Kim Scott	Benang	Winner
2000	Lily Brett	Too Many Men	Shortlist
2000	Dorothy Porter (Note: Dorothy Porter's What a Piece of Work is the first verse novel to be shortlisted.)	What a Piece of Work	Shortlist
2000	Amy Witting	Isobel on the Way to the Corner Shop	Shortlist
2001	Frank Moorhouse	Dark Palace	Winner
2001	Peter Carey	True History of the Kelly Gang	Shortlist
2001	Arabella Edge	The Company	Shortlist
2001	Rodney Hall	The Day We Had Hitler Home	Shortlist
2001	Matthew Kneale (Note: Matthew Kneale's novel is the first by a non-Australian to be shortlisted for the award.)	English Passengers	Shortlist
2001	Alex Miller	Conditions of Faith	Shortlist
2001	Hannie Rayson (Note: Hannie Rayson's Life after George is the first play to be shortlisted.)	Life after George	Shortlist
2002	Tim Winton	Dirt Music	Winner
2002	Steven Carroll	The Art of the Engine Driver	Shortlist
2002	Richard Flanagan	Gould's Book of Fish	Shortlist
2002	Joan London	Gilgamesh	Shortlist
2002	John Scott	The Architect	Shortlist
2003	Alex Miller	Journey to the Stone Country	Winner
2003	Andrea Goldsmith	The Prosperous Thief	Shortlist
2003	Sonya Hartnett	Of a Boy	Shortlist
2003	Kate Jennings	Moral Hazard	Shortlist
2003	Thomas Keneally	An Angel in Australia	Shortlist
2003	Dorothy Porter	Wild Surmise	Shortlist
2004	Shirley Hazzard	The Great Fire	Winner
2004	Peter Carey	My Life as a Fake	Shortlist
2004	J. M. Coetzee	Elizabeth Costello	Shortlist
2004	Peter Goldsworthy	Three Dog Night	Shortlist
2004	Annamarie Jagose	Slow Water	Shortlist
2004	Elliot Perlman	Seven Types of Ambiguity	Shortlist
2005	Andrew McGahan	The White Earth	Winner
2005	Sarah Armstrong	Salt Rain	Shortlist
2005	Steven Carroll	The Gift of Speed	Shortlist
2005	Gail Jones	Sixty Lights	Shortlist
2005	Charlotte Wood	The Submerged Cathedral	Shortlist
2005	Robert Engwerda	Backwaters	Longlist
2005	John Harwood	The Ghost Writer	Longlist
2005	Susan Johnson	The Broken Book	Longlist
2005	Malcolm Knox	A Private Man	Longlist
2005	Amanda Lohrey	The Philosopher's Doll	Longlist
2005	Gerard Windsor	I Have Kissed Your Lips	Longlist
2005	Denise Young	The Last Ride	Longlist
2006	Roger McDonald	The Ballad of Desmond Kale	Winner
2006	Carrie Tiffany	Everyman's Rules for Scientific Living	Shortlist
2006	Brian Castro	The Garden Book	Shortlist
2006	Kate Grenville	The Secret River	Shortlist
2006	Brenda Walker	The Wing of Night	Shortlist
2006	Anne Bartlett	Knitting	Longlist
2006	Stephen Lang	An Accidental Tourist	Longlist
2006	Alex Miller	Prochownik's Dream	Longlist
2006	Joanna Murray-Smith	Sunnyside	Longlist
2006	Peter Rose	A Case of Knives	Longlist
2006	Peter Temple	The Broken Shore	Longlist
2006	Christos Tsiolkas	Dead Europe	Longlist
2007	Alexis Wright	Carpentaria	Winner
2007	Peter Carey	Theft: A Love Story	Shortlist
2007	Gail Jones	Dreams of Speaking	Shortlist
2007	Deborah Robertson	Careless	Shortlist
2007	John Charalambous	Silent Parts	Longlist
2007	Richard Flanagan	The Unknown Terrorist	Longlist
2007	Sandra Hall	Beyond the Break	Longlist
2007	Kate Legge	The Unexpected Elements of Love	Longlist
2008	Steven Carroll	The Time We Have Taken	Winner
2008	David Brooks	The Fern Tattoo	Shortlist
2008	Rodney Hall	Love Without Hope	Shortlist
2008	Gail Jones	Sorry	Shortlist
2008	Alex Miller	Landscape of Farewell	Shortlist
2008	Janette Turner Hospital	Orpheus Lost	Longlist
2008	Thomas Keneally	The Widow and Her Hero	Longlist
2008	Christopher Koch	That Memory Room	Longlist
2008	Nicholas Shakespeare	Secrets of the Sea	Longlist
2009	Tim Winton	Breath	Winner
2009	Louis Nowra	Ice	Shortlist
2009	Murray Bail	The Pages	Shortlist
2009	Richard Flanagan	Wanting	Shortlist
2009	Christos Tsiolkas	The Slap	Shortlist
2009	Toni Jordan	Addition	Longlist
2009	Sofie Laguna	One Foot Wrong	Longlist
2009	Claire Thomas	Fugitive Blue	Longlist
2009	Steve Toltz	A Fraction of the Whole	Longlist
2009	Ian Townsend	The Devil's Eye	Longlist

=== 2010s ===
Miles Franklin Literary Award honorees (2010–2019)
Year	Author	Title	Result
2010	Peter Temple	Truth	Winner
2010	Brian Castro	The Bath Fugues	Shortlist
2010	Deborah Forster	The Book of Emmett	Shortlist
2010	Sonya Hartnett	Butterfly	Shortlist
2010	Craig Silvey	Jasper Jones	Shortlist
2010	Alex Miller	Lovesong	Shortlist
2010	Patrick Allington	Figurehead	Longlist
2010	Peter Carey	Parrot and Olivier in America	Longlist
2010	Jon Doust	Boy on a Wire	Longlist
2010	David Foster	Sons of the Rumour	Longlist
2010	Glenda Guest	Siddon Rock	Longlist
2010	Thomas Keneally	The People's Train	Longlist
2011	Kim Scott	That Deadman Dance	Winner
2011	Chris Womersley	Bereft	Shortlist
2011	Roger McDonald	When Colts Ran	Shortlist
2011	John Bauer	Rocks in the Belly	Longlist
2011	Honey Brown	The Good Daughter	Longlist
2011	Patrick Holland	The Mary Smokes Boys	Longlist
2011	Melina Marchetta	The Piper's Son	Longlist
2011	Stephen Orr	Time's Long Ruin	Longlist
2011	Kirsten Tranter	The Legacy	Longlist
2012	Anna Funder	All That I Am	Winner
2012	Tony Birch	Blood	Shortlist
2012	Frank Moorhouse	Cold Light	Shortlist
2012	Gillian Mears	Foal's Bread	Shortlist
2012	Favel Parrett	Past the Shallows	Shortlist
2012	Steven Carroll	Spirit of Progress	Longlist
2012	Mark Dapin	Spirit House	Longlist
2012	Virginia Duigan	The Precipice	Longlist
2012	Kate Grenville	Sarah Thornhill	Longlist
2012	Gail Jones	Five Bells	Longlist
2012	Alex Miller	Autumn Laing	Longlist
2012	Elliot Perlman	The Street Sweeper	Longlist
2012	Charlotte Wood	Animal People	Longlist
2013	Michelle de Kretser	Questions of Travel	Winner
2013	Annah Faulkner	The Beloved	Shortlist
2013	Drusilla Modjeska	The Mountain	Shortlist
2013	Romy Ash	Floundering	Shortlist
2013	Carrie Tiffany	Mateship with Birds	Shortlist
2013	Lily Brett	Lola Bensky	Longlist
2013	Brian Castro	Street to Street	Longlist
2013	Thomas Keneally	The Daughters of Mars	Longlist
2013	M. L. Stedman	The Light Between Oceans	Longlist
2013	Jacqueline Wright	Red Dirt Talking	Longlist
2014	Evie Wyld	All the Birds, Singing	Winner
2014	Richard Flanagan	The Narrow Road to the Deep North	Shortlist
2014	Fiona McFarlane	The Night Guest	Shortlist
2014	Alexis Wright	The Swan Book	Shortlist
2014	Tim Winton	Eyrie	Shortlist
2014	Cory Taylor	My Beautiful Enemy	Shortlist
2014	Tracy Farr	The Life and Loves of Lena Gaunt	Longlist
2014	Ashley Hay	The Railwayman's Wife	Longlist
2014	Melissa Lucashenko	Mullumbimby	Longlist
2014	Nicolas Rothwell	Belomor	Longlist
2014	Trevor Shearston	Game	Longlist
2015	Sofie Laguna	The Eye of the Sheep	Winner
2015	Joan London	The Golden Age	Shortlist
2015	Christine Piper	After Darkness	Shortlist
2015	Sonya Hartnett	Golden Boys	Shortlist
2015	Craig Sherborne	Tree Palace	Shortlist
2015	Elizabeth Harrower	In Certain Circles	Longlist
2015	Suzanne McCourt	The Lost Child	Longlist
2015	Omar Musa	Here Come the Dogs	Longlist
2015	Favel Parrett	When the Night Comes	Longlist
2015	Inga Simpson	Nest	Longlist
2016	A. S. Patrić	Black Rock White City	Winner
2016	Charlotte Wood	The Natural Way of Things	Shortlist
2016	Peggy Frew	Hope Farm	Shortlist
2016	Myfanwy Jones	Leap	Shortlist
2016	Lucy Treloar	Salt Creek	Shortlist
2016	Tony Birch	Ghost River	Longlist
2016	Stephen Daisley	Coming Rain	Longlist
2016	Mireille Juchau	The World Without Us	Longlist
2016	Stephen Orr	The Hands: An Australian Pastoral	Longlist
2017	Josephine Wilson	Extinctions	Winner
2017	Mark O'Flynn	The Last Days of Ava Langdon	Shortlist
2017	Emily Maguire	An Isolated Incident	Shortlist
2017	Ryan O'Neill	Their Brilliant Careers	Shortlist
2017	Philip Salom	Waiting	Shortlist
2017	Steven Amsterdam	The Easy Way Out	Longlist
2017	Josephine Rowe	A Loving, Faithful Animal	Longlist
2017	Inga Simpson	Where The Trees Are	Longlist
2017	Kirsten Tranter	Hold	Longlist
2018	Michelle de Kretser	The Life to Come	Winner
2018	Eva Hornung	The Last Garden	Shortlist
2018	Gerald Murnane	Border Districts	Shortlist
2018	Felicity Castagna	No More Boats	Shortlist
2018	Catherine McKinnon	Storyland	Shortlist
2018	Kim Scott	Taboo	Shortlist
2018	Peter Carey	A Long Way from Home	Longlist
2018	Lia Hills	The Crying Place	Longlist
2018	Wayne Macauley	Some Tests	Longlist
2018	Jane Rawson	From the Wreck	Longlist
2018	Michael Sala	The Restorer	Longlist
2019	Melissa Lucashenko	Too Much Lip	Winner
2019	Gail Jones	The Death of Noah Glass	Shortlist
2019	Michael Mohammed Ahmad	The Lebs	Shortlist
2019	Gregory Day	A Sand Archive	Shortlist
2019	Rodney Hall	A Stolen Season	Shortlist
2019	Jennifer Mills	Dyschronia	Shortlist
2019	Robbie Arnott	Flames	Longlist
2019	Trent Dalton	Boy Swallows Universe	Longlist
2019	Lexi Freiman	Inappropriation	Longlist
2019	Tracy Sorensen	The Lucky Galah	Longlist

=== 2020s ===
Miles Franklin Literary Award honorees (2020–present)
Year	Author	Title	Result
2020	Tara June Winch	The Yield	Winner
2020	Carrie Tiffany	Exploded View	Shortlist
2020	Philip Salom	The Returns	Shortlist
2020	John Hughes	No One	Shortlist
2020	Peggy Frew	Islands	Shortlist
2020	Tony Birch	The White Girl	Shortlist
2020	Melanie Cheng	Room For a Stranger	Longlist
2020	Anna Krien	Act of Grace	Longlist
2020	Gerald Murnane	A Season on Earth	Longlist
2020	Charlotte Wood	The Weekend	Longlist
2021	Amanda Lohrey	The Labyrinth	Winner
2021	Aravind Adiga	Amnesty	Shortlist
2021	Robbie Arnott	The Rain Heron	Shortlist
2021	Daniel Davis Wood	At the Edge of the Solid World	Shortlist
2021	Andrew Pippos	Lucky’s	Shortlist
2021	Madeleine Watts	The Inland Sea	Shortlist
2021	Gail Jones	Our Shadows	longlist
2021	Sofie Laguna	Infinite Splendours	longlist
2021	Laura Jean McKay	The Animals in That Country	longlist
2021	Mirandi Riwoe	Stone Sky Gold Mountain	longlist
2021	Philip Salom	The Fifth Season	longlist
2021	Nardi Simpson	Song of the Crocodile	longlist
2022	Jennifer Down	Bodies of Light	Winner
2022	Michael Mohammed Ahmad	The Other Half of You	Shortlist
2022	Michelle de Kretser	Scary Monsters	Shortlist
2022	Alice Pung	One Hundred Days	Shortlist
2022	Michael Winkler	Grimmish	Shortlist
2022	Larissa Behrendt	After Story	Longlist
2022	Briohny Doyle	Echolalia	Longlist
2022	Max Easton	The Magpie Wing	Longlist
2022	Jennifer Mills	The Airways	Longlist
2022	Claire Thomas	The Performance	Longlist
2022	Christos Tsiolkas	7 ½	Longlist
2023	Shankari Chandran	Chai Time at Cinnamon Gardens	Winner
2023	Kgshak Akec	Hopeless Kingdom	Shortlist
2023	Robbie Arnott	Limberlost	Shortlist
2023	Jessica Au	Cold Enough for Snow	Shortlist
2023	Yumna Kassab	The Lovers	Shortlist
2023	Fiona Kelly McGregor	Iris	Shortlist
2023	Claire G. Coleman	Enclave	Longlist
2023	George Haddad	Losing Face	Longlist
2023	Pirooz Jafari	Forty Nights	Longlist
2023	Julie Janson	Madukka: The River Serpent	Longlist
2023	Adam Ouston	Waypoints	Longlist
2024	Alexis Wright	Praiseworthy	Winner
2024	Hossein Asgari	Only Sound Remains	Shortlist
2024	Jen Craig	Wall	Shortlist
2024	Andre Dao	Anam	Shortlist
2024	Gregory Day	The Bell of the World	Shortlist
2024	Sanya Rushdi	Hospital	Shortlist
2024	Lauren Aimee Curtis	Strangers at the Port	Longlist
2024	Melissa Lucashenko	Edenglassie	Longlist
2024	Angela O'Keeffe	The Sitter	Longlist
2024	Charlotte Wood	Stone Yard Devotional	Longlist
2025	Siang Lu	Ghost Cities	Winner
2025	Brian Castro	Chinese Postman	Shortlist
2025	Michelle de Kretser	Theory & Practice	Shortlist
2025	Winnie Dunn	Dirt Poor Islanders	Shortlist
2025	Julie Janson	Compassion	Shortlist
2025	Fiona McFarlane	Highway 13	Shortlist
2025	Melanie Cheng	The Burrow	Longlist
2025	Yumna Kassab	Politica	Longlist
2025	Raeden Richardson	The Degenerates	Longlist
2025	Tim Winton	Juice	Longlist
2026	Omar Musa	Fierceland	Winner
2026	Randa Abdel-Fattah	Discipline	Shortlist
2026	Steve MinOn	First Name Second Name	Shortlist
2026	Konrad Muller	My Heart at Evening	Shortlist
2026	Josephine Rowe	Little World	Shortlist
2026	Sean Wilson	You Must Remember This	Shortlist
2026	Lyn Dickens	Salt Upon the Water	Longlist
2026	Toni Jordan	Tenderfoot	Longlist
2026	Madeleine Watts	Elegy, Southwest	Longlist

== See also ==
- Australian History Awards
- Australian literature
- Culture of Australia
- The Commonwealth Writers Prize
- List of Australian literary awards
- List of literary awards
- National Biography Award
- New South Wales Premier's History Awards
- Prime Minister's Literary Awards
