= Siang Lu =

Australian writer

- Lu in 2025 at Queenscliffe Literary Festival
- Born: 1986 (age 39–40)
- Occupations: Author, novelist
- Writing career
- Period: 2022–present
- Genres: Fiction, satire
- Notable works: Ghost Cities, The Whitewash
- Notable awards: Miles Franklin Award, 2025
- Website: www.siang-lu.com

Siang Lu (born 1986) is a Chinese Malaysian Australian author based in Brisbane, Australia. He is best known for winning the Miles Franklin Award in 2025 for his novel Ghost Cities.

== Career ==
=== Novels ===
Lu's debut novel, The Whitewash (2022), is an oral history of a fictional first spy thriller with an Asian male lead. It was shortlisted at the NSW Premier's Literary Awards and won best audiobook at the Australian Book Industry Awards. Prior to publication, Lu won the Queensland Literary Awards Glendower Prize in 2021 for an unpublished manuscript.

Lu completed the manuscript for his second novel, Ghost Cities, in 2015, but the book was rejected more than 200 times by publishers in Australia and overseas before being published by University of Queensland Press in 2024. The success of his debut novel The Whitewash led him to revisit the manuscript. The Miles Franklin Award judges described Ghost Cities as "at once a grand farce and a haunting meditation on diaspora", and "a genuine landmark in Australian literature". The novel was also shortlisted for best fiction at the Queensland Literary Awards and for humour writing at the Victorian Premier's Literary Awards.

=== Other Work ===
Lu also created an online project called The Beige Index, described as "the Bechdel test for race" in the film industry, which has found an audience worldwide.

== Personal life ==
Lu is of Chinese Malaysian heritage and was raised between two cultures. He has two children, and works full-time in the technology sector.

== Works ==
=== Novels ===
- Lu, Siang (2022). The Whitewash. University of Queensland Press.
- Lu, Siang (2024). Ghost Cities. University of Queensland Press.
