= Landscape of Farewell =

2007 novel by Alex Miller

- First edition
- Author: Alex Miller
- Language: English
- Publisher: Allen & Unwin, Australia
- Publication date: 2007
- Publication place: Australia
- Media type: Print (Paperback)
- Pages: 279 pp
- ISBN: 978-1-74175-089-8
- OCLC: 177703939

Landscape of Farewell is a 2007 novel by the Australian author Alex Miller.

== Awards and nominations ==
- Commonwealth Writers Prize, South East Asia and South Pacific Region, Best Book, 2008: shortlisted
- Miles Franklin Literary Award, 2008: shortlisted
- New South Wales Premier's Literary Awards, Christina Stead Prize for Fiction, 2008: shortlisted
- Australian Literature Society Gold Medal, 2008: shortlisted
- Australia-Asia Literary Award, 2008: longlisted

== Reviews ==
- Gorton, Lisa (November 14, 2007). "Landscape of Farewell". The Age.
- "The Australian" 1
- "The Australian" 2
- "The Sydney Morning Herald"
