= Ghost Cities =

2024 novel by Australian author Siang Lu

- Author: Siang Lu
- Language: English
- Genre: Literary novel
- Publisher: University of Queensland Press
- Publication date: May 2024
- Publication place: Australia
- Media type: Print
- Pages: 304 pp.
- Awards: 2025 Miles Franklin Award, winner
- ISBN: 9780702268496

Ghost Cities is a 2024 novel by the Australian author Siang Lu.

It was the winner of the 2025 Miles Franklin Award.

== Synopsis ==
The novel is told in two narrative streams. The first involves a young man named Xiang Lu who lives in Sydney. He loses his job as a translator at the Chinese Consulate; he had been using Google Translate for his work, and can't speak the language. The second is set some centuries earlier and revolves around a mythical emperor working to ensure his empire and his legacy. The two threads are tied together via an unfinished book, Death of a Pagoda. The book is commissioned and then condemned by the ancient emporer, while Xiang Lu becomes involved with a film adaptation of the book.

== Critical reception ==
Reviewing the novel in Australian Book Review Giselle Au-Nhien Nguyen called the author "a playful and imaginative writer who takes obvious pleasure in the possibilities of language – its limitations and permutations." They went on to call the novel "an impressive piece of work that blends genre tropes, storytelling techniques, and observations of the modern world to cement Lu as an assured voice in experimental Australian fiction."

In The Guardian Tara June Winch found the novel to be "both biting satire and love story", concluding that "Lu has a brilliant mind for style, language, pace and ideas, and this is a funny and fascinating book that I can't wait to read again and again."

== Awards ==
- 2025 Miles Franklin Award, winner
- 2025 ALS Gold Medal, shortlisted
- 2025 Age Book of the Year - Fiction, shortlisted
- 2024 Queensland Literary Awards, shortlisted

== See also ==
- 2024 in Australian literature
