= Lovesong (novel) =

Novel by Alex Miller

- First edition
- Author: Alex Miller
- Language: English
- Genre: Novel
- Publisher: Allen & Unwin, Australia
- Publication date: 2009
- Publication place: Australia
- Media type: Print
- Pages: 254 pp
- ISBN: 978-1-74237-366-9

Lovesong is a 2009 novel by the Australian author Alex Miller.

== Premise ==
Australian tourist, John Patterner, finds himself drawn to Sabiha, who with her widowed aunt run the Tunisian cafe Chez Dom on the outskirts of Paris. The two marry and Sabiha longs for a daughter, but the two, for some reason appear unable to conceive. Years later, in Melbourne Australia, John tells his tragic story to Ken, an ageing writer.

== Notes ==
=== Dedication ===
"For Stephanie and for our children Ross and Kate. And for Erin."

=== Epigraph ===
I adjure you, O daughters of Jerusalem,
by the gazelles or the wild does:
do not stir up or awaken love
until it is ready!

— The Song of Solomon

== Critical reception ==
Writing in The Monthly reviewer Geordie Williamson commented: "Miller does not rage against the vileness of womankind or the hypocrisy of marriage as an institution. The fictional husband he creates in Lovesong is adoring and complaisant, his wife a model of loving devotion. Both are largely innocent of the fateful turn in their conjugal history. Indeed, however full of human frailty and confusion the cast of Lovesong may be, they are, with a single exception, people without malice...The usual remark to be made about novels that rely on simplicity to generate their effects is that such clarity is deceptive. But with an author such as Miller – whose prose reads clear as running water, and whose insights into the ethics of storytelling, the sadness of ageing and the motions of the heart are laid out with such directness – perhaps simplicity really is the aim and the end."

Jem Poster in The Guardian was also impressed with the work: "Now in his mid-70s and garlanded with literary awards in his adoptive Australia, Alex Miller may not be unduly concerned about his relatively low profile in the country of his birth. But those who believe that this thoughtful novelist deserves a wider readership in Britain are likely to find their views confirmed by Lovesong."

== Awards and nominations ==
- Winner, 2010 The Age Book of the Year
- Winner, 2010 The Age Book of the Year (Fiction)
- Winner, 2011 New South Wales Premier's Literary Awards, Christina Stead Prize for Fiction
- Winner, 2011 New South Wales Premier's Literary Awards, People's Choice Award
- Shortlisted, 2009 Colin Roderick Award
- Shortlisted, 2010 Miles Franklin Award
- Shortlisted, 2010 Prime Minister's Literary Awards (Fiction)
- Shortlisted, 2010 Queensland Premier's Literary Awards (Fiction)
- Longlisted, 2011 International Dublin Literary Award
