= Bodies of Light =

Novel by Australian writer Jennifer Down

- Author: Jennifer Down
- Language: English
- Genre: Fiction
- Publisher: Text Publishing
- Publication date: 2021
- Publication place: Australia
- Media type: Print
- Pages: 448 pp
- Awards: Miles Franklin Award, 2022
- ISBN: 9781925773590
- Preceded by: Pulse Points : Stories

Bodies of Light (2021) is a novel by Australian writer Jennifer Down.

It won the 2022 Miles Franklin Award, and was shortlisted for the 2022 Voss Literary Prize, the 2022 Stella Prize, the 2022 Barbara Jefferis Award, the 2022 Age Book of the Year Award, the 2022 Davitt Award for Best Adult Crime Novel, and the 2022 Victorian Premier's Literary Award for Fiction.

== Abstract ==
According to Austlit:

A quiet, small-town existence. An unexpected Facebook message, jolting her back to the past. A history she's reluctant to revisit- dark memories and unspoken trauma, bruised thighs and warning knocks on bedroom walls, unfathomable loss.

She became a new person a long time ago. What happens when buried stories are dragged into the light?

This epic novel from the two-time Sydney Morning Herald Young Novelist of the Year is a masterwork of tragedy and heartbreak-the story of a life in full. Sublimely wrought in devastating detail, Bodies of Light confirms Jennifer Down as one of the writers defining her generation.

== Critical reception ==
In The Guardian Declan Fry concludes: "Bodies of Light is a remarkably empathic book, a bildungsroman in the mode of Jane Eyre or Of Human Bondage. Its characters are credibly invested with hopes, convictions, dreams, and desires."

Susan Midalia in the Australian Book Review notes that the book "is both much more ambitious in scope than her first and an altogether more harrowing read. Spanning the years from 1975 to 2018, and traversing many different locations in Australia, New Zealand, and America, the novel confronts us with child sexual abuse, a suicide attempt, a series of fractured relationships, allegations of infanticide, recurring social alienation, and a serious drug addiction. But it is also, and mercifully, a story of a woman’s remarkable resilience, the possibility of human kindness, and the necessity of hope. Bodies of Light thus has affinities with the feminist Bildungsroman popularised in the 1960s and 1970s; a genre that championed a belief in productive self-fashioning by women in the face of systemic misogynistic oppression....Bodies of Light is at its most thought-provoking and emotionally engaging when it pauses in the rush of events to represent the intensity of Maggie’s psychological and bodily experiences."

== See also ==
- 2021 in Australian literature
