= Blood (Birch novel) =

2011 novel by Australian writer Tony Birch

- Author: Tony Birch
- Language: English
- Genre: Literary fiction
- Publisher: University of Queensland Press
- Publication date: 2011
- Publication place: Australia
- Media type: Print (Paperback)
- Pages: 432 pp
- Award: Miles Franklin Award
- ISBN: 9780702239274

Blood (2011) is a novel by Australian author Tony Birch. It was shortlisted for the 2012 Miles Franklin Award.

== Plot summary ==
The novel follows a family in crisis, breaking down under the weight of family violence, drugs, lost opportunities, and general neglect.

== Reviews ==
Conrad Walters in The Sydney Morning Herald found the novel to build to a compelling last third but was let down a little by a hurried ending.

Ed Wright, in The Australian, considered it an "absorbing and endearing tale of children in adversity".

== Awards and nominations ==
| Year | Prize | Category | Result | Ref |
|---|---|---|---|---|
| 2011 | FAW Christina Stead Award | — | Highly Commended | |
| 2012 | Melbourne Prize for Literature | Best Writing Award | Finalist | |
| 2012 | Melbourne Prize for Literature | Civic Choice Award | Winner | |
| 2012 | Miles Franklin Award | — | Shortlisted | |
