= John Hughes (writer) =

Australian writer

- Born: 1961 (age 64–65); Cessnock, New South Wales, Australia
- Occupations: Novelist and essayist
- Writing career
- Notable awards: New South Wales Premier's Literary Awards — Douglas Stewart Prize for Non-Fiction, winner 2005

John Hughes (born 1961) is a Sydney-based Australian writer and retired teacher. His first book of autobiographical essays, The Idea of Home, published by Giramondo in 2004, was widely acclaimed and won both the New South Wales Premier's Literary Awards for Non-Fiction (2005) and the National Biography Award (2006). In 2022, Hughes faced accusations of plagiarism in his 2021 book The Dogs.

== Biography ==
Hughes was born in Cessnock, New South Wales to a father of Welsh descent and a mother who was of Ukrainian descent. Hughes wrote that as a second generation Australian, he "lived in two worlds as a child": one world the routine, real world of Cessnock and the second the exotic foreign world of his European family's past. The sense that he was 'foreign' became central to his sense of self. He felt connected to an imagined past of his grandparents. As a child stories were told to him of how his grandparents fled Kiev during the Second World War and had walked on foot across Europe to Naples. From Naples, they emigrated to Australia. The text in "The Idea of Home" is devoted to the stories of this journey passed down from Hughes' grandfather, and their impact on a young John Hughes.

Hughes started a medical degree, but switched to an undergraduate arts degree at Newcastle University in the late 1970s, and at the end of his Honours year, was offered the Shell Scholarship to Cambridge. His preconceived notions of Europe as a place more sophisticated than his provincial Cessnock prompted him to go. However, as he spent more time in England, and worked on a PhD on Coleridge, he realised that his ideas were wrong, and that provincialism was, if not as obvious, certainly still as potent in what was considered the centre of the academic world. After this, he gave up his "life of letters", as he called it, and returned to Australia.

Back in Sydney, he unsuccessfully tried to teach at his old university, Newcastle. He did, however, complete a PhD thesis at UTS, called "Memory and Forgetting". In 1995, Hughes took a position in the English Department of Sydney Grammar School, where he is senior master in English and senior librarian. As well as his interest in longer forms, Hughes has been published in HEAT Magazine, edited by Ivor Indyk.

== Plagiarism controversy ==
Hughes was accused of plagiarising significant sections of his 2021 book The Dogs by The Guardian. Guardian Australia identified close to 60 similarities between Hughes' book and The Unwomanly Face of War by Svetlana Alexievich. Hughes admitted the plagiarism, although he said it was unintentional.

The Unwomanly Face of War: Somebody betrayed us … The Germans found out where the camp of our partisan unit was.[W]e were saved by the swamps where the punitive forces didn't go. For days, for weeks, we stood up to our necks in water.

The Dogs: Someone betrayed us … The Germans found the camp. We were saved by the swamps. For days we stood up to our necks. Mud and water.

The Unwomanly Face of War: The baby was hungry … It had to be nursed … But the mother herself was hungry and had no milk.

The Dogs The baby was hungry. But she was hungry too and had little milk.

The Unwomanly Face of War: The baby cried. The punitive forces were close … With dogs … If the dogs heard it, we’d all be killed. The whole group – thirty of us … You understand?[W]e can’t raise our eyes. Neither to the mother nor to each other …

The Dogs: [T]he Germans were close … we could hear the dogs. If the dogs heard it … ? There were thirty of us … No one could look at me … No one … You understand …

Hughes acknowledged he had unwittingly copied large sections of Svetlana Alexievich's nonfiction book The Unwomanly Face of War. His publisher Upswell Publishing initially stood by his claims that he had forgotten his original source material because he had "never written a book like The Dogs before that has taken so many different forms over so many years". Alexievich said that such actions were "outrageous" and her translators have similarly expressed their disbelief at the claim that the plagiarism was unintentional. Her translators said "Such things don't happen by coincidence: not with such specific words, sequences, voicing," and said the incident deserved public attention and reproach.

Despite his previous claims that the passages were left in his final work unintentionally, further investigations found that other parts of Hughes' novel copied classic texts including The Great Gatsby, Anna Karenina, and All Quiet on the Western Front.

The Great Gatsby

“He smiled understandingly – much more than understandingly. It was one of those rare smiles with a quality of eternal reassurance in it, that you may come across four or five times in life. It faced – or seemed to face – the whole eternal world for an instant, and then concentrated on you with an irresistible prejudice in your favour. It understood you just so far as you wanted to be understood, believed in you as you would like to believe in yourself, and assured you that it had precisely the impression of you that, at your best, you hoped to convey.”

The Dogs

“She smiled at me then, one of those rare smiles with a quality of eternal reassurance in it that you might come across once in your life, if you were lucky. It faced – or seemed to face – the whole eternal world for an instant, and then concentrated on you with an irresistible prejudice in your favour. It understood you just so far as you wanted to be understood, believed in you as you would like to believe in yourself, and assured you that it had precisely the impression of you that, at your best, you hoped to convey.”

All Quiet on the Western Front (published in 2005 in translation by Brian Murdoch)

“Haie Westhus is carried off with his back torn open; you can see the lung throbbing through the wound with every breath he takes”…

“We see men go on living with the top of their skulls missing; we see soldiers go on running when both their feet have been shot away”…

The Dogs

"She saw a man carried off with his back torn open, the lung throbbing through the wound."

"She saw men go on living with the top of their skulls missing. She saw soldiers go on running when both their feet had been shot away."

Hughes responded to these additional findings by saying: "I don't think I am a plagiarist more than any other writer who has been influenced by the greats who have come before them...This new material has led me to reflect on my process as a writer. I've always used the work of other writers in my own. It's a rare writer who doesn't ... It's a question of degree. As T.S. Eliot wrote in The Sacred Wood, 'Immature poets imitate; mature poets steal; bad poets deface what they take, and good poets make it into something better, or at least something different.' That great centrepiece of modernism, The Wasteland, is itself a kind of anthology of the great words of others. Does this make Eliot a plagiarist? Not at all, it seems. You take, that is, and make something else out of it; you make it your own.”

Hughes' publisher Terri-ann White at Upswell had initially stood by his claims of an accidental mistake, but distanced herself from Hughes after the new findings. She stated, "When I read the manuscript of The Dogs, I was instantly attracted to the character of Michael Shamanov, a dissolute and very flawed middle-aged man dealing with his aged mother who wanted her life to end. Although I have read most of the books now revealed as being quoted without attribution in The Dogs, I sincerely did not recognise them folded into a new text. That's a trust thing, I think. They formed part of this narrative; I don’t have the kind of mind that can sift through the strands of a long novel to hear discord. Besides, it is a book about discord and discomfort between people. (In literary publishing we do not use software tools to track plagiarism.) I was affronted when John Hughes wrote, in his rejoinder in The Guardian yesterday: I wanted the appropriated passages to be seen and recognised as in a collage."

In response to this statement, Hughes apologised, but also said that "In my piece on influences I never intended to imply that I had knowingly passed off other writers words as my own." And further stated: "I sought only to try to clarify as far as I am able how something like this might happen to a fiction writer."

The novel was subsequently removed form the Miles Franklin Award long list.

== Works ==
=== The Idea of Home ===
This autobiographical collection of essays was written over a ten-year period. It is a collection of five interlinked essays where Hughes describes his relationship with the Ukrainian heritage of his mother and grandfather and his childhood experience of growing up as a second generation Australian. The essays are also about how the idea of Europe he developed as a young man clashed with the reality he found in Cambridge and when he travelled though Europe.

=== The Remnants ===
A manuscript written by an Australian art historian is discovered by his son. Claiming to have found a series of lost paintings by Piero della Francesca in Arezzo, the father's manuscript moves between Renaissance Italy and post-Revolutionary Russia – at its core is the relationship the father has with an ageing Russian émigrée who, haunted by the ghost of her murdered son, claims to have nursed the poet Osip Mandelstam in his final days. The remnants of the father's manuscripts, notebooks and diaries are brought together through the son's commentary resulting in a deeply philosophical novel about translation between languages, cultures and, ultimately, the translation of the father into the son.

=== The Dogs ===
Michael Shamanov is a man running away from life's responsibilities. His marriage is over, he barely sees his son and he has not seen his mother since banishing her to a nursing home two years earlier. A successful screen writer, Michael's encounter with his mother’s nurse leads him to discover that the greatest story he has never heard may lie with his dying mother.

The book was shortlisted for the Victorian and New South Wales Premier’s Literary Prizes, and the Miles Franklin Award in 2022. It was withdrawn from competition due to findings of plagiarism.

== Awards ==
- 2005 – New South Wales Premier's Literary Awards Douglas Stewart Prize for Non-Fiction for The Idea of Home: Autobiographical Essays
- 2005 – shortlisted for the New South Wales Premier's Literary Awards Community Relations Commission Award for The Idea of Home: Autobiographical Essays
- 2006 – National Biography Award for The Idea of Home: Autobiographical Essays
- 2006 – inducted into the City of Cessnock Hall of Fame
- 2008 – Queensland Premier's Literary Awards, Australian Short Story Collection – Arts Queensland Steele Rudd Award for Someone Else
- 2020 – shortlisted Miles Franklin Award for No One
- 2022 – shortlisted for Victorian Premier's Prize for Fiction for The Dogs
- 2022 – shortlisted for New South Wales Premier's Literary Awards Christina Stead Prize for Fiction for The Dogs
- 2022 - longlisted Miles Franklin Award for The Dogs. [Withdrawn]

== Bibliography ==
=== Books ===
- The Idea of Home: Autobiographical Essays (Giramondo, 2004) ISBN 1-920882-04-9
- Someone else: fictional essays (Giramondo Pub. for the Writing & Society Research Group at the University of Western Sydney, 2007) ISBN 978-1-920882-25-9
- The Remnants (UWA Publishing, 2012) ISBN 978-1-742583-32-7
- The Garden of Sorrows (UWA Publishing, 2013) ISBN 978-1-742585-14-7
- Asylum (UWA Publishing, 2016) ISBN 978-1-742588-26-1
- No One (UWA Publishing, 2019) ISBN 978-1-760800-29-1
- The Dogs (Upswell, 2021) ISBN 978-0-645076-34-9

=== Selected journal articles ===
- "Essay on Forgetting", Heat 1, 1996
- "Country Towns", Heat 6, 1997-1998
- "Beside", Heat 9 (new series), 2005
- "The Book of Libraries", Heat 18 (new series), 2008

=== Plays ===
- Untitled:A Play in Three Acts, written and directed by John Hughes: performed at the Asian Music and Dance Festival at the Studio at Sydney Opera House in 2002SMH Review (19 August 2002)
