= The Prosperous Thief =

Book by Andrea Goldsmith

- First edition
- Author: Andrea Goldsmith
- Language: English
- Publisher: Allen & Unwin, Australia
- Publication date: 2002
- Publication place: Australia
- Media type: Print (Paperback)
- Pages: 291
- ISBN: 1865087564
- Preceded by: Under the Knife
- Followed by: Reunion

The Prosperous Thief is a 2002 novel by Australian novelist Andrea Goldsmith.

== Plot summary ==
Alice Lewin has survived the Second World War and, as an adult, visits the Kindertransport archive where she learns of a possible relative. She travels to Australia in an attempt to meet Henry Lewin, but it is a meeting with unforeseen consequences.

== Notes ==
- Dedication: for Dot
- Epigraph: 'Virtue and crime weigh the same, I've seen it: in a man who was both criminal and virtuous.' - Tadeusz Rozewicz
- Epigraph: 'We all live in a phantom dwelling.' - Basho

== Reviews ==
- The Compulsive Reader

== Awards and nominations ==
- 2003 shortlisted Miles Franklin Literary Award
