= Grimmish =

Novel

- First edition
- Author: Michael Winkler
- Language: English
- Publisher: Westbourne Books
- Publication date: 2021

Grimmish is a 2021 experimental historical novel by Australian writer Michael Winkler. It was first published as a paperback original in January 2021 in Australia by Westbourne Books. The book is based on the tour of Australia in 1908–09 by boxer Joe Grim. It includes Grim's work as a sparring partner for both Jack Johnson and Tommy Burns prior to their Fight of the Century on Boxing Day 1908.

Grimmish was well received by Australian critics. It was named as a book of the year in The Guardian, The Age and Australian Book Review.

JM Coetzee called it "The strangest book you are likely to read this year."

In the USA, Thomas Hauser gave the book a mainly positive review and called it "a compelling impressionistic portrait".

Critic and academic Emmett Stinson noted, "the self-reflexive and dialogic approach of the book, which – though interested in masculinity – has no interest in glorifying it. Grimmish is almost impossible to summarise. There are historical scenes depicting the brutality of Joe Grim’s fights. There are genuine intellectual engagements with Roland Barthes and Michel Foucault."

In 2022, it was republished in Australia by publisher Puncher & Wattmann. In 2023, it was published in the UK and US by Peninsula Press and Coach House Books, respectively.

Grimmish was shortlisted for the 2022 Miles Franklin Award.
