= Michael Winkler (writer) =

Australian writer

Michael Winkler is an Australian writer of fiction and non-fiction.

Winkler's novel Grimmish was shortlisted for the 2022 Miles Franklin Award. It was the first self-published novel ever longlisted or shortlisted for the prize. Grimmish was subsequently published by Puncher & Wattmann (Australia), Peninsula Press (UK), Coach House Books (North America) and Mutatis Mutandis (Spanish translation, Spain).

His essay 'The Great Red Whale' won the Calibre Prize. His advocacy for local recognition of Leigh Bowery's legacy was instrumental in the naming of the Bowery Theatre in St Albans.

Winkler has been a judge of The Age Book of the Year and the Neilma Sidney Short Story Prize.

== Bibliography ==
- Fahfangoolah The Despised And Indispensable Welcome To Woop Woop (2016) ISBN 9780994579805
- Grungewick: Gritty and Gruesome News Stories of Early Brunswick (2016) ISBN 9780994579812
- Grimmish (2021) ISBN 9781922571274
