= The Bath Fugues =

Book by Brian Castro

- First edition
- Author: Brian Castro
- Language: English
- Publisher: Giramondo Publishing
- Publication date: 2009
- Publication place: Australia
- Media type: Print (Paperback)
- Pages: 355
- ISBN: 9781920882556
- Preceded by: The Garden Book
- Followed by: Street to Street

The Bath Fugues is a 2009 novel by Australian novelist Brian Castro.

== Plot summary ==
The Bath Fugues is a novel of three sections, all interconnecting and modelled on the structure of the Goldberg variations. The first section, "Beckett's Bicycle", tells the story of Jason Redvers, an art forger and writer. The second, "Walter's Brief", concerns Redvers's grandfather Camilo Conceicao, a Portuguese poet. The last, "Sarraute's Surgery", is set in and around Port Douglas in Queensland and features local GP, Judith Sarraute, who had been Redvers's doctor when she was still practising in Sydney.

== Notes ==
Epigraph:

- The Goldberg Variations...are a set of 30 variations for harpsichord by Johann Sebastian Bach. First published in 1741...the work is considered to be one of the most important examples of variation form. It is named after Johann Gottlieb Goldberg, who may have been the first performer. Wikipedia
- It is, in short, music which observes neither end nor beginning, music with neither real climax nor real resolution, music which like Baudelaire's lovers rests lightly on the wings of the unchecked wind. Glenn Gould

== Reviews ==
- The Sydney Morning Herald

== Awards and nominations ==
- 2010 shortlisted Festival Awards for Literature (SA) — Award for Fiction
- 2010 shortlisted Miles Franklin Literary Award
- 2010 shortlisted Queensland Premier's Literary Awards — Best Fiction Book
- 2010 shortlisted Victorian Premier's Literary Awards — The Vance Palmer Prize for Fiction
