= Women & Children =

2023 novel by Australian author Tony Birch

- Author: Tony Birch
- Language: English
- Genre: Novel
- Publisher: University of Queensland Press
- Publication date: October 2023
- Publication place: Australia
- Media type: Print
- Pages: 328 pp.
- ISBN: 9780702268144

Women & Children is a 2023 novel by the Australian author Tony Birch originally published by University of Queensland Press.

== Synopsis ==
Set in the mid-1960s in inner-city Melbourne this novel follows the story of 11-year-old Joe Cluny over the summer holidays as he is supervised by his recently retired grandfather Charlie. Joe lives with his mother Marion and older sister Ruby. When his battered aunty Oona arrives at Marion's door looking for a safe place to stay Joe suddenly has to face the adult world he is slowly becoming aware of.

== Critical reception ==
Writing for The Guardian reviewer Joseph Cummins noted that "writer, activist and academic Tony Birch has a well-earned reputation as one Australia’s master craftsmen of fiction, in both the short story and novel form." He went on to state: "Women & Children could be Birch's most beautiful and forthright book yet, one that speaks to the power of family to stand together in face of adversity."

In The Australian Book Review Naama Grey-Smith was full of praise for Birch's novel: "Like the characters that inhabit Women and Children, Birch is a natural storyteller who makes every element work for him: plot and pace, character and dialogue, scene and setting. Across Birch's prolific output, including this latest offering, what stands out is how unhindered his language feels, how unaffected. Here is a writer who is not afraid of his words – one who would rather have stories where before there was only silence."

== Awards ==
- 2024 The Age Book of the Year Awards - winner
- 2024 ARA Historical Novel Prize — Adult, shortlisted

== See also ==
- 2023 in Australian literature
