= The Lucky Galah =

Book by Tracy Sorensen

- First edition
- Author: Tracy Sorensen
- Language: English
- Genre: Novel
- Publisher: Pan MacMillan, Australia
- Publication date: 27 February 2018
- Publication place: Australia
- Media type: Print (Paperback)
- Pages: 304
- ISBN: 9781760552657

The Lucky Galah (2018) is a novel by Australian author Tracy Sorensen.

== Plot summary ==
The Lucky Galah is set in a fictional remote coastal town named Port Badminton in Western Australia in the year 1969. The story is narrated by a galah named Lucky who can receive signals from satellite dishes (based on OTC Satellite Earth Station Carnarvon).

== Reviews ==
- ABC Radio National Debut writers series: The Lucky Galah
- Newtown Review of Books TRACY SORENSEN The Lucky Galah. Reviewed by Michelle McLaren
- Australian Book Review

== Awards ==
- The UTS Glenda Adams Award for New Writing (2019 NSW Premier's Literary Awards) — Shortlisted
- The Readings Prize for New Australian Fiction (2018) — Shortlisted
- The Indie Book Award for Debut Fiction (2019) — Longlisted
- Russell Prize (2019) — Shortlisted
- Miles Franklin Award (2019) — Longlisted
