= Conditions of Faith =

2000 novel by Alex Miller

- First edition
- Author: Alex Miller
- Language: English
- Publisher: Allen & Unwin, Australia
- Publication date: 2000
- Publication place: Australia
- Media type: Paperback
- Pages: 406 pp
- ISBN: 1-86508-308-9
- OCLC: 44895688

Conditions of Faith is a 2000 novel by the Australian author Alex Miller. Set in the 1920s, it follows the story of Emily, who graduates university in Melbourne, marries, and moves to Paris. There, she grows dissatisfied with her life as a wife.

== Awards ==
- Miles Franklin Award, 2001: shortlisted
- New South Wales Premier's Literary Awards, Christina Stead Prize for Fiction, 2001: winner
