= Watching the Climbers on the Mountain =

1988 novel by Alex Miller

- First edition
- Author: Alex Miller
- Cover artist: Gus Cohen
- Language: English
- Genre: Novel
- Publisher: Pan Books, Australia
- Publication date: 1988
- Publication place: Australia
- Media type: Print (Paperback)
- Pages: 224 pp
- ISBN: 978-0-33027-113-4

Watching the Climbers on the Mountain is a novel by the Australian author Alex Miller. It was first published in 1988 by Pan Books Australia and was republished by Allen & Unwin in 2012.

== Reviews ==
Howard Willis in The Age concluded that the novel is a "good read". he continued:" There are passages of excllent story-telling–the description, for example, of a country-show boxing bout is good, solid stuff."

Reviewing the novel for The Canberra Times Stan Barney noted: "Miller is a good writer, developing a smouldering, sensual tension, particularly in the early part of the book before the two lovers finally get together. His characters are clearly defined so that one can sympathise with and under stand their dilemmas and actions."

== Publishing history ==
After the novel's original publication by Pan Books in 1988 it was subsequently reprinted by Allen and Unwin in 2012, and then by Atlantic Books in the UK in 2017.

== Notes ==
- Dedication: For Stephanie and Ross.

== Interviews ==
Jane Sullivan, 'Interview: Alex Miller', 'The Sydney Morning Herald', October 5, 2013, , accessed January 2014.
