= Inappropriation =

2018 novel by Lexi Freiman

- Author: Lexi Freiman
- Publisher: Ecco Press
- Publication date: July 25, 2018
- ISBN: 9780062847942

Inappropriation is a 2018 satirical novel by Australian author Lexi Freiman.

== Plot ==
When fifteen-year-old Ziggy Klein starts at a new all-girls high school, she finds the social hierarchies confronting and moves to the radical feminist clique. As she tries to work her way through a maze of gender politics, parental weirdness and technology issues she just tries to find out who she really is.

== Reception ==
Lauren Gilbert, writing for Library Journal, called Inappropriation "a bold and heady coming-of-age tale with a biting sense of humor and a heavy dose of contemporary cultural critique".

On behalf of Bookforum, Andrea Long Chu noted that while inappropriation "is satire, [...] it is not sarcasm. A lesser novel than Inappropriation would pick on what the book’s jacket copy calls 'PC culture,' a fruit that hangs so low it might as well be a vegetable. It is easy, and always flattering, to condemn performative wokeness. It is harder, and smarter, to ask if politics ever transcends adolescent fantasy. [...] The results are darkly funny."

Publishers Weekly highlighted how "Freiman perfectly depicts the timeless awkwardness of growing up with the more modern awkwardness of having your life broadcast on social media, and thus growing up in front of the rest of the world."

Deena ElGenaidi, writing for The Brooklyn Rail, noted that "none of the characters in the book are particularly likeable [...] While Freiman’s characters felt like caricatures of teenagers, they also, somehow, felt very real". Elgenaid concluding that "Freiman’s writing is funny, and Ziggy’s voice carries the novel well. Inappropriation, while somewhat unclear in its message, makes for a compelling and highly entertaining read".

On behalf of Booklist, Kathy Sexton called Inappropriation "a humorous and bawdy skewering of identity politics". Sexton noted that "Ziggy is a wonderful character to lead the satirical charge, as she’s convincingly just trying to figure out who she is and how she belongs in the world. Her earnestness offsets the over-the-top humor. Although the novel loses some steam at the halfway point, Freiman’s assured writing carries readers through to the surprisingly heartwarming end".

In a mixed review for The New York Times, Ilana Masad wrote, "Inappropriation is certainly intelligent and has its finger on the zeitgeist of the Instagram and Tumblr generation, but it also paints the worst possible picture of teenagers trying to understand themselves. Who is the book’s intended audience, really? Those of us who understand our own complexities and nuances, and can laugh at the book’s exaggerations of them? Or those who think that all identity politics is nonsense? Surely both groups will enjoy it, but for very different, and in the latter case perhaps troubling, reasons. In satire as in life, there’s a difference between laughing with people and laughing at them."

== Awards ==
Awards for Inappropriation
Year	Award	Result	Ref.
2018	Center for Fiction First Novel Prize	Longlist	
2019	Miles Franklin Award	Longlist	
2019	New Australian Fiction Prize	Shortlist	
