= Prochownik's Dream =

2005 novel by Alex Miller

- First edition
- Author: Alex Miller
- Language: English
- Publisher: Allen & Unwin, Australia
- Publication date: 2005
- Publication place: Australia
- Media type: Print Hardback & Paperback
- Pages: 299 pp
- ISBN: 1-74114-249-0
- OCLC: 64449584
- Dewey Decimal: 823/.914 22
- LC Class: PR9619.3.M469 P76 2005

Prochownik's Dream is a 2005 novel by the Australian author Alex Miller.

== Notes ==
- Dedication: "For Stephanie. For the memory of Max Blatt. "
- Epigraph: "'We cannot arbitrarily invent projects for ourselves: they have to be written in our past as requirements" (Simone de Beauvoir)

== Awards ==
- 2006 Longlisted, Miles Franklin Literary Award
- 2005, FAW Melbourne University Publishing Award, highly commended
