= Shanghai Dancing =

2003 novel by Brian Castro

- First edition
- Author: Brian Castro
- Language: English
- Publisher: Giramondo Publishing
- Publication date: 2003
- Publication place: Australia
- Media type: Print (Paperback)
- Pages: 447
- ISBN: 0957831188
- Preceded by: Stepper
- Followed by: The Garden Book

Shanghai Dancing is a 2003 novel by Australian novelist Brian Castro.

== Plot summary ==
The novel's main character is, like the author, named Castro, living in Australia and hailing from a Chinese and Portuguese background. Antonio Castro is attempting to come to an understanding of his complicated family history, and in particular, about the lives of his parents in Shanghai during the 1930s.

== Notes ==
Epigraph:

- Author note: 'Shanghai Dancing is a fictional autobiography. Told from an Australian perspective and loosely based on my family's life in Shanghai, Hong Kong, and Macau from the 1930s to the 1960s.'
- Epigraph: We photograph things in order to drive them out of our minds. (Franz Kafka)
- Dedication: For B. B.

== Reviews ==
- The Sydney Morning Herald

== Awards and nominations ==
- 2003 shortlisted The Age Book of the Year Award — Fiction Prize
- 2004 shortlisted Festival Awards for Literature (SA) — Award for Innovation in Writing
- 2004 winner New South Wales Premier's Literary Awards — Christina Stead Prize for Fiction
- 2004 winner New South Wales Premier's Literary Awards — Book of the Year
- 2005 longlisted International Dublin Literary Award
