= The Book of Ayn =

2023 novel by Lexi Freiman

- Author: Lexi Freiman
- Language: English
- Genre: Satire
- Publisher: Catapult
- Publication date: November 12, 2023 (paperback 1st ed.); November 14, 2023 (hardcover 1st ed.)
- Publication place: United States
- Media type: Print, kindle, audiobook
- Pages: 256 pp.
- ISBN: 9781646222407; 9781646221929

The Book of Ayn is a novel by Australian writer Lexi Freiman. It was published by Catapult in the United States on November 12, 2023.

== Plot ==
The novel's main character, Anna, is a 39-year-old novelist who is cancelled after she writes a satirical novel about the opioid epidemic in the United States. She finds solace in the individualist egoism of Ayn Rand. In an attempt to emulate Rand, who worked for several years as a screenwriter, Anna moves to Los Angeles and attempts to write a television sitcom featuring an animal character named "Ayn Ram". After falling behind on her TV writing and becoming addicted to Adderall, Anna abandons Rand's ideas. She goes to a Greek commune, where she attempts to experience ego death.

== Reception ==
In a review for The New Yorker, Katy Waldman compares The Book of Ayn to the earlier novel Two Girls, Fat and Thin by Mary Gaitskill, which focuses on a woman who follows a Rand-like character. Waldman says that both novels "mock their characters, but they also argue that egoism can be nourishing and even generative". In The Washington Post, Maddie Crum praises Freiman's skill for writing comedy. In the Los Angeles Times, Ryan Chapman calls the book "one of the funniest and unruliest novels in ages". The novel was also reviewed in Compact, Kirkus Reviews, The New Republic, The New York Review of Books, The New York Times, and The Wall Street Journal.
