= Tony Birch =

Indigenous Australian writer and activist (born c.1957)

- Born: c.1957 (age 68–69); Melbourne, Victoria, Australia
- Education: University of Melbourne (PhD, 2003)
- Occupations: Author, academic
- Writing career
- Language: English
- Years active: 1989–present
- Notable awards: Patrick White Award

Tony Birch FAHA (born c.1957) is an Aboriginal Australian author, academic and activist. He regularly appears on ABC Local Radio and Radio National shows and at writers’ festivals. He was head of the honours programme for creative writing at the University of Melbourne before becoming the first recipient of the Dr Bruce McGuinness Indigenous Research Fellowship at Victoria University in Melbourne in June 2015.

In 2017, he became the first Indigenous writer to win the Patrick White Award. His 2019 novel The White Girl won the 2020 Indigenous Writers' Prize of the New South Wales Premier's Literary Awards.

== Early life ==
Birch's maternal great-grandfather was an Afghani who migrated to Australia in 1890, who had to get exemption from the Immigration Restriction Act 1901 to take his daughter to the Punjab to meet his family. He also has Barbadian convict (James "Prince" Moodie, transported to Tasmania for 14 years for "disobedience") and Aboriginal heritage.

Birch was born around 1957 and grew up around Fitzroy, a working-class suburb of Melbourne then considered a slum. After being expelled from school for the second time, he left school aged 15 and became a telegram boy.

== Education ==
After spending a decade as a firefighter, Birch attended the University of Melbourne as a mature student when he was 30 years old. He was the first Aboriginal student to graduate with a degree in history from the University of Melbourne, and the first to receive a Master of Arts in Creative Writing.

In 2004 he was awarded the University of Melbourne Chancellor's Medal for the best PhD in Humanities and Creative Arts for his 2003 thesis "'Framing Fitzroy': contesting and (de)constructing place and identity in a Melbourne suburb".

== Career ==
He taught Aboriginal history for several years before switching to writing. Birch also worked as a senior curator for the Bunjilaka Aboriginal Cultural Centre at Melbourne Museum.

Birch has appeared on ABC radio on shows such as Conversations, Life Matters and RN Afternoons.

In 2015 he became the first recipient of the Dr Bruce McGuinness Indigenous Research Fellowship at Victoria University in Melbourne. His work involves academic research, creative writing projects, student mentoring, lecturing and community engagement.

In 2019 he published the novel The White Girl.

Birch was appointed to the Boisbouvier Chair in Australian Literature at the University of Melbourne in December 2022.

== Activism ==
Birch is active in a variety of political and social movements, including climate justice, refugee issues and Indigenous issues. His novels integrate themes affecting Indigenous people, such as colonial oppression, dispossession, the Stolen Generations, and generational violence. He donates a portion of profits and prize money he receives to Seed Mob, an Indigenous youth organisation dedicated to climate justice.

== Bibliography ==
=== Novels ===
- —— (2011). Blood. University of Queensland Press. ISBN 9780702239274.
- —— (2015). Ghost River. University of Queensland Press. ISBN 9780702253775.
- —— (2019). The White Girl. University of Queensland Press. ISBN 9780702260384.
- —— (2023). Women & Children. University of Queensland Press. ISBN 9780702266270.

=== Short story collections ===
- —— (2006). Shadowboxing. Scribe. ISBN 9781921753909.
- —— (2009). Father's Day. Hunter Publishers. ISBN 9780980517972.
- —— (2014). The Promise. University of Queensland Press. ISBN 9780702252112.
- —— (2017). Common People. University of Queensland Press. ISBN 9780702259838.
- —— (2021). Dark as Last Night. University of Queensland Press. ISBN 9780702263170.

=== Poetry ===
- —— (2016). Broken Teeth. Cordite Books. ISBN 9780975249222.
- —— (2021). Whisper Songs. University of Queensland Press. ISBN 9780702263279.

=== Anthology contributions ===
- —— (2018). "Gathering Strength". In Heiss, Anita (ed.). Growing Up Aboriginal in Australia. Black Inc. ISBN 978-1-86395-981-0.

=== Selected book reviews ===
Year	Review article	Work(s) reviewed
2021	Birch, Tony (January–February 2021). "Disher country". Australian Book Review (428).	Disher, Garry (2020). Consolation. Text Publishing.

== Awards and honours ==
Year	Nominated work	Award	Category	Result	Ref.
2006	Shadowboxing	Queensland Premier's Literary Awards	Arts Queensland Steele Rudd Award	Shortlisted	
2011	Shadowboxing	Kate Challis RAKA Award		Commended	
2011	Blood	Fellowship of Australian Writers Victoria Inc. National Literary Awards	Christina Stead Award	Highly commended	
2012	Blood	Melbourne Prize for Literature	Best Writing	Finalist	
2012	Blood	Melbourne Prize for Literature	Civic Choice Award	Winner	
2012	Blood	Miles Franklin Award		Shortlisted	
2015		Victoria University Dr Bruce McGuinness Indigenous Research Fellowship		Recipient	
2014	The Promise	Queensland Literary Awards	Steele Rudd Award	Shortlisted	
2014	The Promise	Victorian Premier's Literary Awards	Indigenous Writing	Shortlisted	
2016	Ghost River	Miles Franklin Award		Longlisted	
2017	Ghost River	Victorian Premier's Literary Awards	Indigenous Writing	Winner	
2017		Patrick White Award		Winner	
2019	Common People	Victorian Premier's Literary Awards	Indigenous Writing	Shortlisted	
2020	The White Girl	Miles Franklin Award		Shortlisted	
2020	The White Girl	New South Wales Premier's Literary Awards	Indigenous Writer	Winner	
2022	Dark as Last Night	New South Wales Premier's Literary Awards	Christina Stead Prize for Fiction	Winner	
2022	Dark as Last Night	Prime Minister's Literary Awards	Fiction	Shortlisted	
2022	Dark as Last Night	Queensland Literary Awards	Steele Rudd Award	Winner	
2023		Royal Society of Literature	International Writer	Recipient	
2024	Women & Children	The Age Book of the Year Awards	Fiction	Winner	
2024	Women & Children	ARA Historical Novel Prize	Adult	Shortlisted	
2024		Australian Academy of the Humanities	Fellow	Elected	
