= Tracy Sorensen =

Australian novelist and academic (1963–2025)

Tracy Anne Sorensen
- Born: 17 October 1963
- Died: 5 May 2025 (aged 61); Bathurst, New South Wales, Australia
- Writing career
- Language: English
- Notable work: The Lucky Galah
- Website: squawkingalah.com.au

Tracy Sorensen (17 October 1963 – 5 May 2025) was an Australian novelist, filmmaker and academic.

== Career ==
Sorensen was a tutor and lecturer at Charles Sturt University and published five academic papers.

In February 2018, her debut novel The Lucky Galah was published through Pan MacMillan. It was shortlisted and longlisted in multiple awards (see below). It is narrated by a flightless pet galah observing characters from a family's back verandah in a small Western Australian town. In August 2019, Sorensen was awarded the Judy Harris Writer in Residence Fellowship at the University of Sydney's Charles Perkins Centre. In July 2023, Sorensen's second book The Vitals was published through Pan MacMillan. It deals with her experience of cancer in 2014 from the point of view of her affected abdominal organs.

== Personal life ==
Sorensen was born on 17 October 1963. She grew up in Carnarvon on the north coast of Western Australia, and lived in Bathurst from 2003.

In 2013 she was diagnosed with peritoneal cancer, spurring her into writing two novels. After treatment the cancer went into remission, but returned 8 1/2 years later.

She graduated with a PhD in 2024 from Charles Sturt University School of Communication and Creative Industries, with her research focused on the role of handicrafts such as crochet in climate change communication.

Sorenson died on 5 May 2025, at the age of 61.

== Bibliography ==
=== Novels ===
- The Lucky Galah (Pan MacMillan, 2018)
- The Vitals (Pan MacMillan, 2023)

== Awards ==
=== The Lucky Galah ===
- The UTS Glenda Adams Award for New Writing (2019 NSW Premier's Literary Awards) — Shortlisted
- The Readings Prize for New Australian Fiction (2018) — Shortlisted
- The Indie Book Award for Debut Fiction (2019) — Longlisted
- Russell Prize (2019) — Shortlisted
- Miles Franklin Award (2019) — Longlisted
