= Double-Wolf =

Book by Brian Castro

- First edition
- Author: Brian Castro
- Language: English
- Publisher: Allen & Unwin
- Publication date: 1991
- Publication place: Australia
- Media type: Print (Paperback)
- Pages: 226
- ISBN: 0044423470
- Preceded by: Pomeroy
- Followed by: After China

Double-Wolf is a 1991 novel by Australian novelist Brian Castro.

== Plot summary ==
The novel is a fictionalised account of the life of Wolf-Man, Sigmund Freud's most famous patient, counter-pointed with an account of Artie Catacomb, a con-man and psychoanalyst living in the Blue Mountains of New South Wales.

== Reviews ==
- The Canberra Times - Reviewer Peter Fuller considered the novel to be the best imaginative writing of the year

== Awards and nominations ==
- 1991 winner The Age Book of the Year Award — Imaginative Writing Prize
- 1992 winner Victorian Premier's Literary Awards — The Vance Palmer Prize for Fiction
- 1992 winner Diabetes Australia Prize for Innovative Writing and the Sheaffer Pen Prize
- 1992 shortlisted Miles Franklin Award
