= The White Girl (novel) =

2019 novel by Australian author Tony Birch

- Author: Tony Birch
- Language: English
- Genre: Novel
- Publisher: University of Queensland Press
- Publication date: 3 June 2019
- Publication place: Australia
- Media type: Print
- Pages: 265 pp.
- Awards: 2020 New South Wales Premier's Literary Awards — Indigenous Writer's Prize, winner
- ISBN: 9780702260384

The White Girl is a 2019 novel by the Australian author Tony Birch originally published by Picador.

It was the winner of the 2020 New South Wales Premier's Literary Awards — Indigenous Writer's Prize.

== Synopsis ==
In the 1960s, in the fictional Australian country town of Deane, Aboriginal Odette Brown cares for her granddaughter Sissy, conceived after her daughter was raped by a local white pastoralist, Joe Kane. Lily, Odette's daughter and Sissy's mother, has fled Deane for the big city. With Lily away Odette must also try to stop the new local policeman Sergeant Lowe from taking Sissy (the "white girl" of the title) from her care.

== Critical reception ==
Reviewing the novel for The Australian Book Review Sandra R. Phillips concluded: "Tony Birch has stated that this work took him eight weeks to write. All credit to him for bringing a lifetime of knowledge about Australian history, social policy, and cultural identity to this book, a deceptively simple story about family love that is rich in humanity and purpose, and hope. The White Girl is worth your time and will reward you over and over again."

In The Saturday Paper Khalid Warsame praised Birch's writing, stating: "Birch, both as a storyteller and as a prose stylist, is uncommonly subtle, and the considerable complexity of his writing isn't always immediately apparent." They continued: "The White Girl is shot through with an at-times-sickening familiarity. As a writer, Birch has always relied on the credibility of his characters and settings to propel his stories; here, the deliberate ambiguities in place and time create a sense that this story is one that has played out thousands and thousands of times, across the entire breadth of this country, for decades."

== Awards ==
- 2020 New South Wales Premier's Literary Awards — Indigenous Writer's Prize, winner
- 2020 Miles Franklin Award, shortlisted

== Notes ==
- Dedication: "For Archie James (Born 4 August 2018) Only women know"
- Tony Birch was interviewed about the novel by Paul Daley of The Guardian

== See also ==
- 2019 in Australian literature
