= Jennifer Down =

Australian writer

- Born: 1990 (age 35–36)
- Education: University of Melbourne; RMIT
- Occupation: Novelist
- Writing career
- Language: English
- Notable work: Bodies of Light (2021)
- Notable awards: Miles Franklin Award (2022)
- Website: www.jenniferdown.com

Jennifer Down (born 1990) is an Australian novelist and short story writer. She won the 2022 Miles Franklin Award for her novel Bodies of Light.

== Biography ==
Down was in born 1990. She studied arts at University of Melbourne before studying professional writing and editing at RMIT.

Down has worked as a writer, editor, and a translator.

== Awards and recognition ==
Down won the 2014 Elizabeth Jolley Short Story Prize for "Aokigahara" and received third prize in The Age Short Story Award for "A Ticket to Switzerland" in 2010.

Down's first novel, Our Magic Hour, was shortlisted for the 2014 Victorian Premier's Unpublished Manuscript Award. She was chosen as one of The Sydney Morning Herald Best Young Australian Novelists in 2017 for Pulse Points and 2018 for Bodies of Light. She won the Steele Rudd Award at the Queensland Literary Awards and the Readings Prize in 2018 for Pulse Points.

Her 2021 novel, Bodies of Light, won the 2022 Miles Franklin Award and was shortlisted for the 2022 Victorian Premier's Prize for Fiction, the 2022 Stella Prize, the 2022 fiction The Age Book of the Year, the 2022 Barbara Jefferis Award and the 2022 Voss Literary Prize.

== Works ==
- Down, Jennifer (2016). Our Magic Hour. Melbourne: The Text Publishing Company. p. 304. ISBN 978-1925240832.
- —— (2017). Pulse Points: Stories. Melbourne: The Text Publishing Company. p. 240. ISBN 978-1925355970.
- —— (2021). Bodies of Light. Melbourne: The Text Publishing Company. p. 448. ISBN 978-1925773590.
