= Brian Castro =

Australian novelist and essayist

- Born: Brian Albert Castro; 1950 (age 75–76); At sea, near Hong Kong
- Occupations: Novelist and essayist
- Writing career
- Language: English
- Years active: 1973–
- Notable work: Shanghai Dancing

Brian Albert Castro (born 1950) is an Australian novelist and essayist.

== Early life and education ==
Castro was born at sea, between Macau and Hong Kong, in 1950. His father was of Spanish, Portuguese, and English descent, and born in Shanghai. His mother was the daughter of a Chinese farmer and an English missionary. His first language was Cantonese Chinese, but his maternal grandmother taught him English, and he also learnt Macanese Portuguese (spoken in Macao) and French.

He moved to Australia in 1961, first attending a boarding school in Sydney,at St Joseph's College, Hunters Hill and the University of Sydney, after which he worked in Australia, France and Hong Kong as a teacher and writer.

== Career ==
He was Chair of Creative Writing (2008–2019) at the University of Adelaide and director of the J. M. Coetzee Centre for Creative Practice there.

His first novel, Birds of Passage (1983), won The Australian/Vogel Literary Award. Double-Wolf (1991) won The Age Fiction Prize, the Vance Palmer Prize and the Innovative Writing Prize at the Victorian Premier's Literary Awards. After China (1992) again won the Victorian Premier's Literary Award. His sixth novel, Stepper (1997), was awarded the National Book Council Prize (Banjo Award) for Fiction. Shanghai Dancing was published by Giramondo in March 2003, winning the Victorian Premier's Literary Award and the NSW Premier's Award, and was named NSW Book of the Year. The Garden Book won the 2006 Queensland Premier's Literary Award, and The Bath Fugues was short-listed for the Miles Franklin Award, the South Australian Premier's Award, the Queensland Premier's Fiction Prize and the Victorian Premier's Literary Award.

In 2012 he published Street To Street, inspired by the life of the poet Christopher Brennan (Giramondo). Blindness and Rage won the Prime Minister's Award for Poetry in 2018.

In 2014 he won the Patrick White Award for Literature for his contribution to Australian Literature.

== Awards and nominations ==
- 1982: Australian/Vogel Literary Award for his first novel, Birds of Passage (shared award)
- 1991: Victorian Premier's Literary Award Vance Palmer Prize for Fiction, plus the Innovative Writing Award for Double-Wolf
- 1991: The Age Book of the Year for Double-Wolf
- 1991: Miles Franklin Award (Shortlisted) for Double-Wolf
- 1992: Victorian Premier's Literary Award for After China
- 1992: Miles Franklin Award (Shortlisted) for After China
- 1997: Banjo Award for Stepper
- 2004: Victorian Premier's Literary Award for Fiction, for Shanghai Dancing
- 2004: New South Wales Premier's Literary Awards Christina Stead Fiction Prize and Book of the Year for Shanghai Dancing
- 2006: Miles Franklin Award (Shortlisted) for The Garden Book
- 2006: Queensland Premier's Literary Awards Fiction Book Award for The Garden Book
- 2010: Miles Franklin Award (Shortlisted), The Bath Fugues
- 2014: Adelaide Festival Awards for Literature (Shortlisted), Street To Street
- 2014: Patrick White Award for Literature, Contribution to Australian Literature
- 2018: Prime Minister's Literary Award for Poetry, for Blindness and Rage
- 2025: Miles Franklin Award (Shortlisted), for Chinese Postman
- 2026: Legacy award, Asia Pacific Arts Awards (Shortlisted)

== Bibliography ==
=== Novels and verse novels ===
- Birds of Passage (1983)
- Pomeroy (1990)
- Double-Wolf (1991)
- After China (1992)
- Drift (1994)
- Stepper (1997)
- Shanghai Dancing (2003)
- The Garden Book (2005)
- The Bath Fugues (2009)
- Street To Street (2012)
- Blindness and Rage (2017)
- Chinese Postman (2024)

=== Non-fiction ===
- (Monograph) Writing Asia: two lectures (1995) ISBN 9780731703364
- Looking for Estrellita: Essays on Culture and Writing (1999) ISBN 9780702231155

=== Poetry ===
- Macau Days (with John Young) (2017)
