= Reading Madame Bovary =

Book by Amanda Lohrey

- First edition
- Author: Amanda Lohrey
- Language: English
- Genre: short story collection
- Publisher: Black Inc
- Publication date: 2010
- Publication place: Australia
- Media type: Print Paperback
- Pages: 269
- ISBN: 9781863954907
- Preceded by: Vertigo
- Followed by: A Short History of Richard Kline

Reading Madame Bovary (2010) is a collection of short stories by Australian author Amanda Lohrey. It won the Fiction Prize and Arts Queensland Steele Rudd Australian Short Story Award at the Queensland Premier's Literary Awards in 2011.

== Contents ==
- "Primates"
- "Reading Madame Bovary"
- "Ground Zero"
- "Freedom, Order and the Golden Bead Material"
- "Perfect"
- "The Art of Convalesence"
- "The Existence of Other Men"
- "John Lennon's Gardener"
- "Letter to the Romans"

== Reviews ==
Carol Middleton in Overland was impressed by the stories: "Lohrey has a remarkable ability to be lyrical and profound while keeping both feet in the here and now of Australian life. For a ‘literary’ writer, she is refreshingly comfortable with the mundane minutiae of modern life (to-do lists and washing up) and, from there, teases out the themes and issues that lie beneath the surface of contemporary consciousness."

== Awards and nominations ==
- 2011 winner Queensland Premier's Literary Awards – Best Fiction Book
- 2011 winner Queensland Premier's Literary Awards – Arts Queensland Steele Rudd Australian Short Story Award

== See also ==
- 2010 in Australian literature
