= Chai Time at Cinnamon Gardens =

2022 novel by Shankari Chandran

- Author: Shankari Chandran
- Language: English
- Genre: Fiction
- Publisher: Ultimo Press
- Publication date: 2022
- Publication place: Australia
- Media type: Print
- Pages: 384 pp.
- Awards: Miles Franklin Award, 2023
- ISBN: 9781761150319
- Preceded by: The Barrier

Chai Time at Cinnamon Gardens (2022) is a novel by Australian writer Shankari Chandran. It was originally published by Ultimo Press in Australia in 2022.

It was the winner of the 2023 Miles Franklin Award.

== Synopsis ==
The Cinnamon Gardens of the title is a nursing home in Sydney, set up in the 1980s by Maya and Zakhir, a Sri Lankan couple who fled their country during the civil war. Now Zakhir is missing, and Maya is a resident of the nursing home which is now run by her daughter Anjali. When a friend of Anjali discovers that Maya and Zakhir once toppled a statue of James Cook which once stood at the nursing home, he lodges a complaint with the Human Rights Commission, accusing the couple of racism.

The novel is told along two timelines: the present day; and in Sri Lanka in the 1980s.

== Dedication ==
- "For Ellora, Kailash, Hari and Siddharth"

== Critical reception ==
Writing for The Guardian, Zoya Patel noted: "At first glance, Chai Time at Cinnamon Gardens, the latest novel from prolific Australian author Shankari Chandran, may look like a light affair: a tale about a diverse group of elderly Australians living in a family-run nursing home in Sydney. But beyond the twee cover and cozy title, Chandran's novel has serious heft, spanning several timelines and tackling complex topics like race, trauma and the structural inequality engendered in so-called multicultural Australia...Chai Time in Cinnamon Gardens is an enticing, if not entirely realised, opportunity for a wider conversation about Australia, the diversity of its people and the gaps in our collective cultural knowledge. This is a book that requires concentration and full immersion – but it will reward the reader for that investment."

On the AU review website Emily Paull found a lot to like about the book: "At just over 350 pages, the book manages to cover discussions about politics, race, history, relationships and so much more, without ever feeling didactic or forced. This is real life, but it is also good storytelling. I hope that many readers will pick up this novel, and join the conversation that this book begins."

== Awards ==
- Miles Franklin Award, 2023, winner

== See also ==
- 2022 in Australian literature

== Notes ==
- Jason Steger, of The Sydney Morning Herald, interviewed the author about the book after it was awarded the Miles Franklin Award.
