= The Tivington Nott =

1989 novel by Alex Miller

- First edition
- Author: Alex Miller
- Language: English
- Genre: Novel
- Publisher: Robert Hale
- Publication date: 1989
- Publication place: Australia
- Media type: Print
- Pages: 174 pp
- ISBN: 0-7090-3548-9

The Tivington Nott is a novel by the Australian author Alex Miller and is based on the lives of real people in Somerset on the borders of Exmoor. Miller tells his own story of a young labourer swept up in the adventure of riding second horse in a west country stag hunt. The Tivington Nott was first published by Robert Hale (UK) in 1989 and was republished by Allen & Unwin (Australia) in 2005.

== Awards and nominations ==
- 1989 Winner, Braille Book of the Year Award
