= Brenda Walker =

Australian writer (1957–2024)

- Born: Brenda Joanne Walker; 1957; Grafton, New South Wales, Australia
- Died: 10 December 2024 (aged 67); Perth, Western Australia, Australia
- Education: University of New England; Australian National University
- Writing career
- Language: English
- Years active: 1983–2010
- Notable work: The Wing of Night
- Notable awards: Nita Kibble Literary Award 2006, 2011; Victorian Premier's Literary Awards, Non-Fiction, 2010

Brenda Joanne Walker (1957 – 10 December 2024) was an Australian writer. Born in Grafton, New South Wales, she studied at the University of New England in Armidale and, after gaining a PhD in English (on the work of Samuel Beckett) at the Australian National University, she moved to Perth in 1984. She was a Winthrop Professor of English and Cultural Studies at the University of Western Australia. She had also been a visiting fellow at Stanford University and the University of Virginia.

Walker was the sister of songwriter and musician Don Walker, and the daughter of author Shirley Walker.

Walker was killed on 10 December 2024 while crossing Kings Park Road in Perth by a driver speeding at 97 kilometres per hour (60 mph). The driver was moments earlier seen driving at 104 kilometres per hour (65 mph), while the speed limit on Kings Park Road is 60 kilometres per hour (37 mph). The driver, Lucas Martins Da Silva, was charged with dangerous driving causing death in circumstances of aggravation. He pleaded guilty to the charge in September 2025 and was sentenced to four years in prison in May 2026.

== Awards ==
- 2011: Nita Kibble Literary Award, winner for "Reading by Moonlight"
- 2010: Victorian Premier's Awards, Nettie Palmer Prize for Non-Fiction, winner for "Reading by Moonlight"
- 2010: Queensland Premier's Literary Awards, shortlisted for "Reading by Moonlight"
- 2007: Asher Award, winner for The Wing of Night
- 2006: Nita Kibble Literary Award, winner for The Wing of Night
- 2006: Miles Franklin Award, shortlisted for The Wing of Night
- 2006: New South Wales Premier's Literary Awards, Christina Stead Prize, shortlisted for The Wing of Night
- 2006: Waverley Library Award for Literature, The Alex Buzo Shortlist Prize: winner for The Wing of Night
- 2000: Victorian Premier's Literary Award, shortlisted for Poe's Cat
- 2000: New South Wales Premier's Literary Awards, Christina Stead Prize, Shortlisted for "Poe's Cat"
- 1990: T.A.G. Hungerford Award for an unpublished manuscript, winner for Crush

== Bibliography ==
=== Novels ===
- Crush (1991)
- One More River (1993)
- Poe's Cat (1999)
- The Wing of Night (2005)

=== Memoir ===
- Reading by Moonlight: How Books Saved a Life (2010)

=== Edited ===
- The Writer's Reader: A Guide to Writing Fiction and Poetry (2002)
