= Autumn Laing =

2011 novel by Alex Miller

- First edition
- Author: Alex Miller
- Language: English
- Publisher: Allen & Unwin, Australia
- Publication date: 2011
- Publication place: Australia
- Media type: Print (hardback)
- Pages: 452 pp
- ISBN: 978-1-74237-851-0
- OCLC: 177703939

Autumn Laing is a 2011 novel by the Australian author Alex Miller.

== Awards and nominations ==
- Winner, Melbourne Prize for Literature 2012
- Shortlisted, 2012 Prime Minister's Literary Award for Fiction
- Shortlisted, 2011 Manning Clark House National Cultural Awards (Individual category)
- Shortlisted, 2012 Adelaide Festival Awards for Literature Fiction Award
- Shortlisted, 2012 Queensland Literary Awards

== Reviews ==
- Morag Fraser, 2011, 'A Space of Its Own Creation, Alex Miller's Indispensable New Novel', "Australian Book Review", , accessed 1 July 2013.
- Janine Burke, 2011, 'Autumn Laing by Alex Miller', "The Monthly" , accessed 1 July 2013.
- Stephens, Andrew (September 24, 2011). "Leave it to Autumn". The Age.
