= A Brief Affair (novel) =

2022 novel by Alex Miller

- Author: Alex Miller
- Language: English
- Publisher: Allen & Unwin
- Publication date: 1 November 2022
- Publication place: Australia
- ISBN: 1761185527
- OCLC: 1411183726

A Brief Affair is a novel written by Australian author Alex Miller. It follows Dr. Francis Egan, a successful woman with a family in her early 40s who begins to suffer from a mid-life crisis after a one-night stand at a conference in China.

== Reception ==
Joseph Cummins of The Guardian stated: "Despite its slim size, A Brief Affair is a moving study of the value of both writing and reading. In many ways it is a distillation of all of Miller’s invaluable fiction." Erich Mayer of ArtsHub gave the novel a 4/5 rating, praising the "perfectly paced" narrative and the "generally convincing and well-rounded" characters, calling Miller an "excellent storyteller." Jessica Gildersleeve of The Conversation opined that the novel's "emphasis on the ways we might each construct our own story – while respecting the stories of others around us – it has a profound impact."
