= The Passage of Love =

2017 novel by Alex Miller

- First edition
- Author: Alex Miller
- Language: English
- Publisher: Allen & Unwin, Australia
- Publication date: 2017
- Publication place: Australia
- Media type: Print (Paperback)
- Pages: 584 pp
- ISBN: 978 1 76029 734 3
- Preceded by: The Simplest Words
- Followed by: Max (Book)

The Passage of Love is a 2017 novel by the Australian author Alex Miller. Michael Cathcart, when interviewing Alex Miller on ABC Radio, described The Passage of Love as 'The most candid, sharing, generous book I've read in a long, long time.'

== Reviews ==
- "The Real Truth in Novels", Jason Steger, The Sydney Morning Herald, 4 November 2017.
- Kirkus Reviews, 'A rich addition to the growing shelf of autofiction from a seasoned storyteller', June 18, 2018.
- Bridget Delaney, 'Alex Miller evokes lost Melbourne and past loves in 'private and personal' novel', The Guardian, 13 Dec 2017.

== Awards ==
- 2018 ALS Gold Medal, longlisted
- 2018 Indie Awards — Fiction. longlisted
