= Jem Poster =

British poet and novelist

Jem Poster (born 1949) is a British poet and novelist. His works include the collection of poetry Brought to Light (2001) and the novels Courting Shadows (2003) and Rifling Paradise (2006).

== Early life ==
Poster was born in Cambridge, England.

== Writing ==
Poster first attracted notice as a poet, and his debut collection, Brought to Light, was published in 2001. A year later his first novel appeared: Courting Shadows is a historical novel with dark gothic undertones, a first-person account of a young architect's visit to a remote rural village, and of the damage he inflicts both on the community and on the fabric of its church. The book was widely and positively reviewed, with Julie Myerson, describing it in The Guardian as "highly, bewitchingly readable … a fantastically tightly written, read-every-word novel", and Jane Jakeman, writing in The Independent, noted that it was "beautifully written, full of precision and intensity."

Poster's second novel, Rifling Paradise, was published in 2006. It follows the fortunes of Charles Redbourne, a minor nineteenth-century landowner who goes out to New South Wales in the hope of making his name as a collector of scientific specimens and finds himself forced by terrifying circumstances into a radical reappraisal of his life and his relationship to the natural world. Jonathan Bate in The Guardian described the novel as "stylish, assured and thoughtful" while The Mail on Sunday's reviewer described it as "a terrifying journey into the dark recesses of the human soul", adding that its "evocation of the native [Australian] flora and fauna is inspiring."

Poster's environmental and cultural concerns have been widely discussed, most notably in Mariadele Boccardi's "The Naturalist in the Garden of Eden: Science and Colonial Landscape in Jem Poster's Rifling Paradise", published in Victoriographies vol. 6, no. 2, June 2016 (Edinburgh University Press).

== Career ==
He has worked variously as an archaeologist for English Heritage, as lecturer in English Literature with Oxford University Department for Continuing Education, as Chair of Creative Writing at Aberystwyth University and as advisor and tutor for Cambridge University's MSt in Creative Writing. He is a former fellow of Kellogg College, Oxford and former chair of the editorial board of New Welsh Review.

== Bibliography ==
- Brought to Light (Bloodaxe, 2001)
- Courting Shadows (Sceptre, 2003)
- Rifling Paradise (Sceptre, 2006)
- (Editor) Edward Thomas, Selected Prose, Vol. III, Biographies (Oxford University Press, 2018)
