= Morag Fraser =

Australian journalist and literary critic

Morag Fraser AM is an Australian journalist and literary critic. Fraser edited the magazine Eureka Street from 1991 till 2003. Fraser was an adjudicator of the Miles Franklin Award from 2005 to 2011. She is currently the chairperson of the Australian Book Review.
