= 1989 in Australian literature =

This article presents a list of the historical events and publications of Australian literature during 1989.

== Events ==
- Peter Carey won the Miles Franklin Award for Oscar and Lucinda

== Major publications ==
=== Novels ===
- Jessica Anderson — Taking Shelter
- Mena Calthorpe — The Plain of Ala
- Bryce Courtenay — The Power of One
- Tom Flood — Oceana Fine
- Peter Goldsworthy — Maestro
- Elizabeth Jolley — My Father's Moon
- Nicholas Jose — Avenue of Eternal Peace
- Tom Keneally — Towards Asmara
- Alex Miller — The Tivington Nott
- Amy Witting — I for Isobel

=== Short story anthologies ===
- Liam Davison — The Shipwreck Party
- Brian Matthews — Quickening and Other Stories

=== Crime and mystery ===
- Kerry Greenwood — Cocaine Blues, the first in the Phryne Fisher series.
- Jennifer Rowe — Murder by the Book

=== Science fiction and fantasy ===
- Judith Clarke — The Boy on the Lake : Stories
- Greg Egan – "The Cutie"
- Rosaleen Love — The Total Devotion Machine and Other Stories

=== Children's and young adult fiction ===
- Graeme Base — The Eleventh Hour
- Morris Gleitzman — Two Weeks with the Queen

=== Poetry ===
- Robert Adamson — The Clean Dark
- Dorothy Hewett — A Tremendous World in Her Head: Selected Poems
- Dorothy Porter — Driving Too Fast
- Peter Porter — Possible Worlds
- John Scott — Singles: Shorter Poems, 1982-1986
- Peter Skrzynecki — "Night Swim"

=== Drama ===
- Nick Enright — Daylight Saving
- Jenny Kemp — Call of the Wild
- Peta Murray
  - Spitting Chips
  - Wallflowering
- David Williamson — Top Silk

=== Non-fiction ===
- Jill Ker Conway — The Road from Coorain
- Adam Shoemaker — Black Words, White Page: Aboriginal Literature 1929-1988
- Elisabeth Wynhausen — Manly Girls

== Awards and honours ==
- Mary Durack AC, for "service to the community and literature"
- Les Murray (poet) AO, for "service to Australian literature"
- Thomas Shapcott AO, for "service to Australian literature and to arts administration"
- Gwen Harwood AO, for "service to literature, particularly as a poet and librettist"
- Max Harris (poet) AO, for "service to literature"
- Clement Semmler AM, for "service to Australian literature"
- John Morrison (writer) AM, for "service to literature"

=== Lifetime achievement ===
| Award | Author |
|---|---|
| Christopher Brennan Award | Chris Wallace-Crabbe |
| Patrick White Award | Thea Astley |

=== Literary ===
| Award | Author | Title | Publisher |
|---|---|---|---|
| The Age Book of the Year Award | Marsden Hordern | Mariners are Warned!: John Lort Stokes and HMS Beagle in Australia 1837-1843 | Melbourne University Press |
| ALS Gold Medal | Frank Moorhouse | Forty-Seventeen | Viking Books |
| Colin Roderick Award | Chris Symons | John Bishop : A Life for Music | |

=== Fiction ===
==== International ====
| Award | Category | Author | Title | Publisher |
|---|---|---|---|---|
| Commonwealth Writers' Prize | Best First Novel, SE Asia and South Pacific region | Gillian Mears | Ride a Cock Horse | Pascoe Publishing |

==== National ====
| Award | Author | Title | Publisher |
|---|---|---|---|
| Adelaide Festival Awards for Literature | Not awarded | | |
| The Age Book of the Year Award | Elizabeth Jolley | My Father's Moon | Viking |
| The Australian/Vogel Literary Award | Mandy Sayer | Mood Indigo | Allen and Unwin |
| Miles Franklin Award | Peter Carey | Oscar and Lucinda | University of Queensland Press |
| New South Wales Premier's Literary Awards | Helen Hodgman | Broken Words | Penguin Books Australia |
| Victorian Premier's Literary Awards | Rodney Hall | Captivity Captive | Farrar Straus and Giroux |
| Western Australian Premier's Book Awards | Marion Campbell | Not Being Miriam | Fremantle Arts Centre Press |

=== Children and Young Adult ===
| Award | Category | Author | Title | Publisher |
|---|---|---|---|---|
| Adelaide Festival Awards for Literature | Children's | Not awarded | | |
| Children's Book of the Year Award | Older Readers | Gillian Rubinstein | Beyond the Labyrinth | Hyland House |
| Children's Book of the Year Award | Picture Book | Graeme Base | The Eleventh Hour | Viking Kestrel |
| Children's Book of the Year Award | Picture Book | Allan Baillie & Jane Tanner | Drac and the Gremlin | Viking Kestrel |
| New South Wales Premier's Literary Awards | Young People's Literature | Mary Pershall | You Take the High Road | Penguin |
| Victorian Premier's Prize for Young Adult Fiction | | Caroline MacDonald | The Lake at the End of the World | Hodder & Stoughton |

=== Science fiction and fantasy ===
| Award | Category | Author | Title | Publisher |
|---|---|---|---|---|
| Australian SF Achievement Award | Best Australian Long Fiction | Damien Broderick | Striped Holes | Avon |
| Australian SF Achievement Award | Best Australian Short Fiction | Lucy Sussex | "My Lady Tongue" | Matilda at the Speed of Light |

=== Poetry ===
| Award | Author | Title | Publisher |
|---|---|---|---|
| Adelaide Festival Awards for Literature | Not awarded | | |
| Anne Elder Award | Mark Miller | Conversing with Stones | Five Islands Press |
| Grace Leven Prize for Poetry | Dorothy Hewett | A Tremendous World in Her Head | Dangaroo Press |
| Mary Gilmore Award | Alex Skovron | The Rearrangement | Melbourne University Press |
| New South Wales Premier's Literary Awards | John Tranter | Under Berlin | University of Queensland Press |
| Victorian Premier's Literary Awards | Gwen Harwood | Bone Scan | Angus and Robertson |

=== Drama ===
| Award | Category | Author | Title |
|---|---|---|---|
| New South Wales Premier's Literary Awards | FilmScript | Not awarded | |
| New South Wales Premier's Literary Awards | Radio Script | Alana Valentine | The Story of Anger Lee Bredenza |
| New South Wales Premier's Literary Awards | Television Script | Bob Ellis and Stephen Ramsay | The True Believers |
| New South Wales Premier's Literary Awards | Play | Stephen Sewell | Hate |
| Victorian Premier's Literary Awards | Drama | Daniel Keene | Silent Partner |

=== Non-fiction ===
| Award | Author | Title | Publisher |
|---|---|---|---|
| Adelaide Festival Awards for Literature | Not awarded | | |
| The Age Book of the Year Award | Marsden C. Hordern | Mariners are Warned!: John Lort Stokes and HMS Beagle in Australia 1837-1843 | Melbourne University Press |
| New South Wales Premier's Literary Awards | Maslyn Williams | His Mother's Country | Melbourne University Press |
| Victorian Premier's Literary Awards | Oskar Spate | Paradise Found and Lost | ANU Press |

== Births ==
A list, ordered by date of birth (and, if the date is either unspecified or repeated, ordered alphabetically by surname) of births in 1989 of Australian literary figures, authors of written works or literature-related individuals follows, including year of death.

- 2 June — Will Kostakis, author and journalist

Unknown date

- Robbie Arnott, author

== Deaths ==
A list, ordered by date of death (and, if the date is either unspecified or repeated, ordered alphabetically by surname) of deaths in 1989 of Australian literary figures, authors of written works or literature-related individuals follows, including year of birth.

- 3 June – Connie Christie, children's writer/illustrator, photographer and commercial artist (born 1908 in England)
- 16 August – Donald Friend, artist and diarist (born 1914)

== See also ==
- 1989 in Australia
- 1989 in literature
- 1989 in poetry
- List of years in literature
- List of years in Australian literature
