= 1988 in Australian literature =

This article presents a list of the historical events and publications of Australian literature during 1988.

== Events ==
- Peter Carey won the 1988 Booker Prize for Oscar and Lucinda
- The Miles Franklin Award was not awarded this year as the date was changed from year of publication to year of announcement.

== Major publications ==
=== Novels ===
- Peter Carey — Oscar and Lucinda
- Liam Davison — The Velodrome
- Rodney Hall — Captivity Captive
- Helen Hodgman — Broken Words
- Dorothy Johnston — Maralinga, My Love
- Thomas Keneally — Act of Grace
- Alex Miller — Watching the Climbers on the Mountain
- Gerald Murnane — Inland
- Morris West — Masterclass
- Tim Winton — In the Winter Dark

=== Short stories ===
- Rob Hood — Daydreaming on Company Time
- Olga Masters — The Rose Fancier
- Frank Moorhouse — Forty-Seventeen

=== Children's and young adult fiction ===
- Graeme Base — The Eleventh Hour
- Hesba Fay Brinsmead — When You Come to the Ferry
- Caroline MacDonald — The Lake at the End of the World
- P. L. Travers — Mary Poppins and the House Next Door
- Gillian Rubinstein — Beyond the Labyrinth
- Tim Winton — Jesse

=== Crime fiction ===
- Jon Cleary — Now and Then, Amen
- Peter Corris — Man in the Shadows : A Short Novel and Six Stories
- Marele Day — The Life and Crimes of Harry Lavender (first in the Claudia Valentine series)

=== Science fiction and fantasy ===
- Damien Broderick
  - Matilda at the Speed of Light (edited)
  - Striped Holes
- David J. Lake — West of the Moon
- Lucy Sussex – "My Lady Tongue"

=== Poetry ===
- Gwen Harwood — Bone Scan
- Judith Rodriguez — The House by Water: New and Selected Poems
- John Tranter — Under Berlin

=== Drama ===
- Andrew Bovell — After Dinner
- Jan Cornall — Escape from a Better Place

=== Non-fiction ===
- Tom Cole — Hell West and Crooked
- Peter Conrad — Down Home: Revisiting Tasmania
- Laurie Hergenhan (editor) — The Penguin New Literary History of Australia
- Eric Rolls — A Million Wild Acres
- Dale Spender — Writing a New World: Two Centuries of Australian Women Writers

== Awards and honours ==
- Dorothy Auchterlonie Green AO, for "service to Australian literature, particularly as a writer, critic and teacher"
- Elizabeth Jolley AO, for "service to Australian literature"
- Rosemary Wighton AO, for "public service, to literature and to the community"
- Tom Hungerford AM, for "service to literature"
- David Martin (poet) AM, for "service to Australian literature"
- Gavin Souter AM, for "service to literature and journalism"
- Len Beadell OAM, for "service to the Public service and to literature"

=== Lifetime achievement ===
Award	Author
Christopher Brennan Award	Roland Robinson
Patrick White Award	Roland Robinson

=== Literary ===
Award	Author	Title	Publisher
The Age Book of the Year Award	Frank Moorhouse	Forty-Seventeen	Viking
ALS Gold Medal	Brian Matthews	Louisa	McPhee Gribble
Colin Roderick Award	Peter Carey	Oscar and Lucinda	Hyland House

=== Fiction ===
==== International ====
Award	Category	Author	Title	Publisher
Booker Prize		Peter Carey	Oscar and Lucinda	University of Queensland Press
Commonwealth Writers' Prize	Best Novel, SE Asia and South Pacific region	George Turner	The Sea and Summer	Faber & Faber

==== National ====
Award	Author	Title	Publisher
Adelaide Festival Awards for Literature	Rod Jones	Julia Paradise	McPhee Gribble
The Age Book of the Year Award	Frank Moorhouse	Forty-Seventeen	Viking
The Australian/Vogel Literary Award	Tom Flood	Oceana Fine	Allen and Unwin
Miles Franklin Award	Not awarded		
New South Wales Premier's Literary Awards	John Sligo	Final Things	Penguin Books Australia
Victorian Premier's Literary Awards	Murray Bail	Holden's Performance	Viking
Western Australian Premier's Book Awards	Tim Winton	Minimum of Two	Fremantle Arts Centre Press

=== Children and Young Adult ===
Award	Category	Author	Title	Publisher
Adelaide Festival Awards for Literature	Children's	Gillian Rubinstein	Space Demons	Omnibus Books
Children's Book of the Year Award	Older Readers	John Marsden	So Much to Tell You	Walter McVitty Books
Children's Book of the Year Award	Picture Book	Bob Graham	Crusher is Coming!	Lothian Books
New South Wales Premier's Literary Awards	Young People's Literature	Gillian Rubinstein	Answers to Brut	Omnibus Books
Victorian Premier's Prize for Young Adult Fiction		John Marsden	So Much to Tell You	Walter McVitty Books

=== Science fiction and fantasy ===
Award	Category	Author	Title	Publisher
Australian SF Achievement Award	Best Australian Long Fiction	Terry Dowling	For As Long As You Burn	Aphelion SF Magazine
Australian SF Achievement Award	Best Australian Short Fiction	Terry Dowling	"The Last Elephant"	Australian Short Stories #20

=== Poetry ===
Award	Author	Title	Publisher
Adelaide Festival Awards for Literature	Les Murray	The Daylight Moon	Angus & Robertson
Anne Elder Award	Alex Skovron	The Rearrangement	Melbourne University Press
Grace Leven Prize for Poetry	John Tranter	Under Berlin	University of Queensland Press
Mary Gilmore Award	Judith Beveridge	The Domesticity of Giraffes	Black Lightning Press
New South Wales Premier's Literary Awards	Judith Beveridge	The Domesticity of Giraffes	Black Lightning Press
Victorian Premier's Literary Awards	Judith Beveridge	The Domesticity of Giraffes	Black Lightning Press

=== Drama ===
Award	Category	Author	Title
New South Wales Premier's Literary Awards	Film Script	Laura Jones	High Tide
New South Wales Premier's Literary Awards	Radio Script	Keith Gallasch and Virginia Baxter	Australia-Japan: A Love Story
New South Wales Premier's Literary Awards	Television Script	Anthony Wheeler	Olive
New South Wales Premier's Literary Awards	Play	Alma De Groen	The Rivers of China
Victorian Premier's Literary Awards	Drama	Alma De Groen	The Rivers of China

=== Non-fiction ===
Award	Author	Title	Publisher
Adelaide Festival Awards for Literature	Trevor Wilson	The Myriad Faces of War	Polity/Blackwells
The Age Book of the Year Award	Robin Gerster	Big-Noting : The Heroic Theme in Australian War Writing	Melbourne University Press
New South Wales Premier's Literary Awards	Brian Matthews	Louisa	McPhee Gribble
Victorian Premier's Literary Awards	Brian Matthews	Louisa	McPhee Gribble

== Deaths ==
A list, ordered by date of death (and, if the date is either unspecified or repeated, ordered alphabetically by surname) of deaths in 1988 of Australian literary figures, authors of written works or literature-related individuals follows, including year of birth.

- 4 January — Alice Duncan-Kemp, writer and Indigenous rights activist (born 1901)
- 28 February — Kylie Tennant, novelist, playwright, short-story writer, critic, biographer and historian (born 1912)
- 31 July — Stephen Murray-Smith, writer, editor and educator (born 1922)
- 12 November — Vincent Buckley, poet, teacher, editor, essayist and critic (born 1925)

== See also ==
- 1988 in Australia
- 1988 in literature
- 1988 in poetry
- List of years in literature
- List of years in Australian literature
