= 1987 in Australian literature =

This article presents a list of the historical events and publications of Australian literature during 1987.

== Events ==
- Glenda Adams won the 1987 Miles Franklin Award for Dancing on Coral

== Major publications ==
=== Novels ===
- Glenda Adams — Dancing on Coral
- Murray Bail — Holden's Performance
- Sumner Locke Elliott — Waiting for Childhood
- Barbara Hanrahan — Kewpie Doll
- Nicholas Hasluck — Truant State
- David Ireland — Bloodfather
- Nicholas Jose — Paper Nautilus
- Thomas Keneally — The Playmaker
- Olga Masters — Amy's Children
- Colleen McCullough — The Ladies of Missalonghi
- Boyd Oxlade — Death in Brunswick
- Nancy Phelan — Home is the Sailor
- Eric Willmot — Pemulwuy, the Rainbow Warrior

=== Short stories ===
- Jessica Anderson — Stories from the Warm Zone
- Thea Astley — It's Raining in Mango
- Julie Lewis — The Walls of Jericho: Stories
- John Sligo — Final Things
- Patrick White — Three Uneasy Pieces

=== Children's and young adult fiction ===
- John Marsden — So Much to Tell You

=== Science fiction and fantasy ===
- Greg Egan – "Neighbourhood Watch"
- Isobelle Carmody — Obernewtyn
- George Turner — The Sea and Summer

=== Crime and mystery ===
- Jon Cleary — Dragons at the Party
- Peter Corris — The January Zone
- Jennifer Rowe — Grim Pickings

=== Poetry ===
- Judith Beveridge — The Domesticity of Giraffes
- Dorothy Hewett — Alice in Wormland
- Les Murray— The Daylight Moon
- Elizabeth Riddell — Occasions of Birds and Other Poems

=== Drama ===
- Dorothy Hewett — Me and the Man in the Moon
- David Malouf — Blood Relations
- Wendy Richardson — Windy Gully
- David Williamson — Emerald City

=== Non-fiction ===
- Brian Matthews — Louisa
- Sally Morgan — My Place

== Awards and honours ==
- Rosemary Dobson AO, for "service to literature, particularly in the field of poetry"
- David Malouf AO, for "service to literature"
- Peter Cowan (writer) AM, for "service to Australian literature"
- Ruth Park AM, for "service to literature"
- Rica Erickson AM, for "service to the arts, particularly as an author and illustrator

=== Lifetime achievement ===
Award	Author
Christopher Brennan Award	Not awarded
Patrick White Award	William Hart-Smith

=== Literary ===
Award	Author	Title	Publisher
The Age Book of the Year Award	Jessica Anderson	Stories from the Warm Zone	Penguin
ALS Gold Medal	Alan Wearne	The Nightmarkets	Penguin
Colin Roderick Award	Nancy Phelan	Home is the Sailor and the Best of Intentions	Hyland House

=== Fiction ===
==== International ====
Award	Category	Author	Title	Publisher
Commonwealth Writers' Prize	Best Novel, SE Asia and South Pacific region	Blanche d'Alpuget	Winter in Jerusalem	Heinemann

==== National ====
Award	Author	Title	Publisher
Adelaide Festival Awards for Literature	Not awarded		
The Age Book of the Year Award	Jessica Anderson	Stories from the Warm Zone	Penguin
The Australian/Vogel Literary Award	Jim Sakkas	Ilias	Allen and Unwin
Miles Franklin Award	Glenda Adams	Dancing on Coral	Viking Press
New South Wales Premier's Literary Awards	Glenda Adams	Dancing on Coral	Viking Press
Victorian Premier's Literary Awards	Janine Burke	Second Sight	Greenhouse Publications
Western Australian Premier's Book Awards	Joan London	Sister Ships	Fremantle Arts Centre Press

=== Children and Young Adult ===
Award	Category	Author	Title	Publisher
Adelaide Festival Awards for Literature	Children's	Not awarded		
Children's Book of the Year Award	Older Readers	Simon French	All We Know	Angus and Robertson
Children's Book of the Year Award	Picture Book	Junko Morimoto, translated by Isao Morimoto	Kojuro and the Bears	Random House
New South Wales Premier's Literary Awards	Young People's Literature	Nan Hunt and Betina Ogden	A Rabbit Named Harris	William Collins

=== Science fiction and fantasy ===
Award	Category	Author	Title	Publisher
Australian SF Achievement Award	Best Australian Science Fiction or Fantasy Novel	Keith Taylor	Bard III: The Wild Sea	Berkley Publishing
Australian SF Achievement Award	Best Australian Science Fiction or Fantasy Short Fiction	Terry Dowling	"The Man Who Lost Red"	MirrorDanse Books

=== Poetry ===
Award	Author	Title	Publisher
Adelaide Festival Awards for Literature	Not awarded		
Anne Elder Award	Sarah Day	A Hunger to be Less Serious	Angus & Robertson
Grace Leven Prize for Poetry	Elizabeth Riddell	Occasions of Birds and Other Poems	Brindabella Press
Mary Gilmore Award	Jan Owen	Boy with Telescope	Angus & Robertson
New South Wales Premier's Literary Awards	Philip Hodgins	Blood and Bone	Angus & Robertson
Victorian Premier's Literary Awards	Lily Brett	The Auschwitz Poems	Scribe

=== Drama ===
Award	Category	Author	Title
New South Wales Premier's Literary Awards	Film Script	David Parker	Malcolm
New South Wales Premier's Literary Awards	Television Script	Helen Garner	Two Friends
New South Wales Premier's Literary Awards	Play	David Malouf	Blood Relations
Victorian Premier's Literary Awards	Drama	Ben Lewin	A Matter of Convenience

=== Non-fiction ===
Award	Author	Title	Publisher
Adelaide Festival Awards for Literature	Not awarded		
The Age Book of the Year Award	Robert Hughes	The Fatal Shore	Knopf
New South Wales Premier's Literary Awards	Patrick O'Farrell	The Irish In Australia	University of New South Wales Press
Victorian Premier's Literary Awards	Hugh Stretton	Political Essays	

== Deaths ==
A list, ordered by date of death (and, if the date is either unspecified or repeated, ordered alphabetically by surname) of deaths in 1987 of Australian literary figures, authors of written works or literature-related individuals follows, including year of birth.

- 3 March — Cyril Pearl, Australian journalist, editor, author, social historian, wit and television personality (born 1904)
- 18 April — Kenneth Cook, Australian journalist, television documentary maker and novelist (born 1929)
- 8 May — Marjorie Barnard, Australia novelist and short story writer, critic, historian and librarian (born 1897)
- 24 May — Robert D. Fitzgerald, poet (born 1902)
- 3 July — Grace Perry, poet, playwright, and founder and editor of the South Head Press (born 1927)
- 17 December — Lucy Walker, romance novelist (born 1907)

== See also ==
- 1987 in Australia
- 1987 in literature
- 1987 in poetry
- List of years in literature
- List of years in Australian literature
