= Banjo Awards =

Australian literary award

The National Book Council Banjo Awards were presented by the National Book Council of Australia from 1974 to 1997 for works of fiction and non-fiction.

== History ==
The inaugural awards were given in 1974 or 1975.

The name commemorates the bush poet Andrew Barton Banjo Paterson.

The Council has enjoyed notable leadership, including Justice Michael Kirby and Michael Fraser (1991–1998).

Many notable Australian writers have been recipients for this award, including Peter Carey, Tim Winton, Alan Gould, Liam Davison, Sally Morrison, and Roger McDonald. In 1978 Helen Garner was the first woman to win the award for her novel Monkey Grip.

The current Banjo Paterson Writing Award, established in 1991, is separate from the above awards, although similarly aims to commemorate the work of Banjo Paterson.

== Winners ==
Winners include:

=== Fiction ===
- 1975 William Nagle for The Odd Angry Shot
- 1978 Helen Garner for Monkey Grip
- 1981 David Foster for Moonlight
- 1982 Peter Carey for Bliss
- 1985 Peter Carey for Illywhacker
- 1988 Maurice Lurie for Whole Life
- 1989 Peter Carey for Oscar and Lucinda
- 1990 Thea Welsh for The Story of the Year of 1912 in the Village of Elza Darzins
- 1991 Glenda Adams for Longleg and Tim Winton for Cloudstreet
- 1992 Alan Gould for To the Burning City
- 1993 Liam Davison for Soundings
- 1994 Elizabeth Jolley for The Georges' Wife
- 1995 Sally Morrison for Mad Meg
- 1996 Rod Jones for Billy Sunday
- 1997 Brian Castro for Stepper

=== Non-fiction ===
- 1978 Kevin Gilbert for Living Black: Blacks Talk to Kevin Gilbert (1977)
- 1981 Albert Facey for A Fortunate Life
- 1988 Manning Clark for History of Australia, Volume Six
- 1990 Steve Hawke & Michael Gallagher for Noonkambah: Whose Land, Whose Law
- 1991 Drusilla Modjeska for Poppy
- 1992 David Marr for Patrick White: A Life and Roger Milliss for Waterloo Creek: The Australia Day Massacre of 1838, George Gipps and the British Conquest of New South Wales
- 1993 Roger McDonald for Shearers' Motel
- 1994 Hazel Rowley for Christina Stead: A Biography (1994)
- 1995 Peter Singer for Rethinking Life and Death
- 1996 Henry Reynolds

== Notes ==
Notable shortlisted authors include:

- Matthew Condon, in 1992 for Usher and in 1995 for The Ancient Guild of Tycoons,
- Robert Dessaix for A Mother's Disgrace in 1994.
- Garry Disher for The Sunken Road in 1996.
- Richard Flanagan for Death of a River Guide (1995)
- David Foster (novelist) for The Glade Within the Grove, 1996
- Rodney Hall for Captivity Captive in 1989 and The Grisly Wife in 1994.
- Marion Halligan for Spider Cup in 1990 and Lovers' Knots: A Hundred-Year Novel in 1993
- Susan Johnson (Australian author) A Big Life (1993);
- Alex Miller for The Ancestor Game (1993)

== See also ==
- List of Australian literary awards
