= The Burnt Ones =

Book by Patrick White

- First edition (UK)
- Author: Patrick White
- Language: English
- Genre: Short story collection
- Publisher: Eyre and Spottiswoode
- Publication date: 1964
- Publication place: Australia
- Media type: Print (paperback)
- Pages: 316
- ISBN: 0-14-002776-9
- Followed by: The Cockatoos

The Burnt Ones is a collection of eleven short stories by Australian writer Patrick White, first published by Eyre and Spottiswoode in 1964. Penguin Books published it in 1968 with reprints in 1972 and 1974. Each story in the collection, whose title refers to people burnt by society, has a reference to burning actually and in metaphor.

Seven of the stories are set in Australia and four are set in Greece or concern Greek migrants. The suburb of Sarsaparilla, the setting for several stories, is like Our Town of Thornton Wilder, but with White's "beadily disapproving gaze".

In White's first collection of a series of three, The Burnt Ones are haunted by feelings of isolation, intense self-examination, and an acute awareness of how they are different from others. The stories follow the theme of loneliness as do the second collection titled The Cockatoos, and Three Uneasy Pieces, his third and last collection.

== Title ==
The title comes from the Greek turn of phrase meaning, "the poor unfortunates" (οι καυμενοι [hoi kaumenoi]), the burnt ones. White plays on the literal meaning of the title by introducing the motif of burning in most of the stories through sun burn, fire, war, anger, burn-out or hurt to characterise his "elect", those burnt by society and by existence.

The book is dedicated to the late author and historian Geoffrey Dutton and his wife, Nin. The fourth story, "Clay" is also for fellow Australians, satirist Barry Humphries and actress Zoe Caldwell (p 114).

== Contents ==
1. Dead Roses
2. Willy-Wagtails by Moonlight
3. A Glass of Tea
4. Clay
5. The Evening at Sissy Kamara's
6. A Cheery Soul
7. Being Kind to Titina
8. Miss Slattery and her Demon Lover
9. The Letters
10. The Woman who wasn't Allowed to Keep Cats
11. Down at the Dump

== Plot summaries ==
=== Dead Roses ===
Anthea Scudamore, a girl who's very close to her mother and influenced by her tastes, is growing up with few social skills. After staying with friends on an island for the summer, she returns home feeling somehow changed. She marries her father's old friend, Hessell Mortlock – moving away to live in his family home where he subtly morphs from a confident businessman, revealing his stingy, mean-spirited ways and that he was married several times before. Like the heat-blasted roses that stand throughout the house, domestic life with Mortlock petrifies. Eventually Anthea leaves him, returning home on the death of her father. By chance her husband dies in a car accident before changing his will against her and on her inheritance she travels the world, never quite finding what she is looking for.

=== Willy-Wagtails by Moonlight ===
"Wagtails" is the visit by Jum and Eileen Wheeler to their bird-watching friends Arch and Nora Mackenzie. Preparing to be bored, they meet Arch's secretary Mildred Cullen, as she leaves by taxi, which they consider a luxury. The after-dinner entertainment for the evening is the bird-watching couple's latest recordings of lyre birds and bell birds. When the tape fails the hostess hurriedly replaces it with one of willy wagtails while she attends to other things. Jum and Eileen are left alone in the lounge room with the recording which starts with the birds, but includes the unwitting sounds of sex in the bush until they hear the voices of the host and his secretary, making them uncomfortable witnesses to a secret affair. When Nora returns to the room for the last bird calls, they realise it was she who made the recording though she doesn't say so outright. Nora carries on as if nothing has happened while insisting Arch listens to the whole tape with her, another time.

=== A Glass of Tea ===
Caught up in storytelling in a mouldering summer house, the middle-aged Greek, Malliakas visits an old friend's contact and octogenarian, Philippides in Cologny, in Geneva, Switzerland. Over tea, he hears the Greek-centred love story of Yanko and his jealous Constantia, of prophecy and Russian glassware, precious for a reason. A vague, oblique story, it keeps him wrapt while they wait for the wife to return.

=== Clay ===
Clay Skerritt is a sensitive boy living with his widowed mother who on a whim, named him after pottery. The kids bash him up because of his unusual name and because he is "different". His unimaginative mother fearing his unconventional nature, has his head shorn to emphasise his maleness, causing the kids to bash him for that as well. Growing up, he meets Marj with the voice as flat "as the colour of masonite" ( p122) who like his mother, also lacks understanding – except that later, she has intuited the need to erase links with his mother. After his mother dies they marry stalely, while slowly Clay begins to change for the worse, shocking in his eccentricity.

=== The Evening at Sissy Kamara's ===
The story opens with Mrs Pantzopoulos at the dentist. Greeks Poppy and Basil Pantzopoulos plan to have dinner at the house of her friend Sissy. Intellectual Sissy Kamara writes unpublished poetry, encourages artists and lives with her husband Sotos Louloudis of mysterious means. The couples have little in common except that Poppy and Sissy escaped from Smyrna in the war, becoming refugees with their bonds of shared memory.

=== A Cheery Soul ===
This is the story of change for people overtaken by the goodness of elderly Miss Docker. Ted Custance and his wife take her in as a boarder. From charitable beginnings, life with the outspoken Miss Docker becomes even more strained until Mrs Custance arranges for her to move to a home, freeing them to become closer than before in the joint knowledge she would be unbearable to the inmates. Leaving a trail of well-intentioned exposures and unwelcome remarks, Miss Docker goes on to assail the local minister in the final scene.

=== Being Kind to Titina ===
Dionysios tells this story in the first person while living with his large well-educated family from Alexandria when the "inferior" Stavrides family moves in across the street in Schutz. Everyone tells Dionysios to be kind to the daughter, awkward unlovely Titina who becomes the butt of the children's tortures and scorn. Within a few years, the two children meet again as teenagers in reversed roles – Titina, rich, beautiful, charming and based in Paris, is instead generous to Dionysios. After she returns to Paris he finds out her profession.

=== Miss Slattery and her Demon Lover ===
It is Australia 1961 and Miss Slattery, a door to door market researcher for Better Sales Pty Ltd, calls on Tibor Szabor, a Hungarian, whose home is paved with black and white real marble tiles, has a harbour "View", and a mirror ceiling over the mink covered bed. She needs him more than he needs her until the bohemian party where she shows her talent with a whip that drives him crazy. But Miss Dimity Slattery is no stranger to change.

=== The Letters ===
"Letters" is a descent into madness. Mrs Ursula Polkinghorn writes to a close family friend on second best paper, engraved with "Wishfort, Sarsaparila, N.S.W." Even while she tries to maintain the status quo ante, her main concern is her fragile son Charles who is having a birthday. At first a promising boy, Charles was called back to the family firm where he soon had a breakdown. The letters of the story are unopened mail he protects himself from by stacking it away in a box. Following his withdrawal from involvement with the world, he maintained distance until now, turning 50, he decides to open the letters along with his frightening paranoia.

=== The Woman who wasn't Allowed to Keep Cats ===
Americans, Spiro Hajistavros and his wife Maro are calling on the Alexious family in Athens. They start a fight on the way there along a sunburnt street, over her friendship with Kikitsa and Aleko. The fight is along class lines, the friends being impoverished intellectuals and they, wealthy New York restaurateurs. As they climb the baking streets, their wealthy American life falls away until they arrive – a couple of Greeks after all – in Kikitsa's cat-infested apartment. The story continues with the couples circling each other warily in different encounters, until one day, Maro visits Kikitsa by herself. This time, the Alexioi have moved up in the world, Aleko now a successful writer, Kikitsa is thin again, and there is a ban on cats in their lives. Due to the ban, Kikitsa takes up her own sensuality, a girlfriend fling is revisited and the Alexioi find an inspired passion for each other.

=== Down at the Dump ===
Wal and Mum Whalley are in the "bits and pieces trade" (scrap dealers) – Wal works the dumps. They are planning a day out at Sarsaparilla dump to avoid a funeral in the street. The Town Councillor's wife, Mrs Hogben prepares to bury her sister Daise Morrow and her daughter Meg is on leave from school for the funeral. The dump is beside the cemetery, a vantage point for the writer to explore the thoughts of men who knew Daise gathering at the grave, and the family at the dump stirring each other abusively. Daise seems to embody the only person accepting of both sides of the tracks, until a tender truce is played out between Meg and the dumpers' son, Lummy that suggests life will always slip from the controls of social standing.

== Critical reception ==
White's short stories are noted for their multiplicity of symbols, myths, and allegories, as were his longer works of fiction. Critic Hameeda Hossain says, "In describing the pathos of a slow crumbling of suburban souls, his stories evoke a sense of tragedy... of a whole way of life." Scholar William Walsh describes his dense poetic imagery as penetrating beyond material appearances to "mysterious actuality".

In his 1976 essay, Ingmar Björkstén states that the short story is "not Patrick White's best medium of expression" during his discussion of The Burnt Ones.

== Awards ==
- 1965 - winner ALS Gold Medal
