= Dark Palace =

Novel by Frank Moorhouse

- First edition
- Author: Frank Moorhouse
- Language: English
- Genre: Historical novel
- Publisher: Random House Australia
- Publication date: 2000
- Publication place: Australia
- Media type: Print (Hardcover & paperback)
- Pages: 678 pp
- ISBN: 9780091836764 (hardcover 1st ed.)
- OCLC: 247939503
- Dewey Decimal: 823/.914 21
- LC Class: PR9619.3.M6 D3 2000
- Preceded by: Grand Days
- Followed by: Cold Light

Dark Palace is a novel by Australian author Frank Moorhouse that won the 2001 Miles Franklin Award.

The novel forms the second part of the author's Edith Trilogy, following Grand Days (1993) and preceding Cold Light (2011). The trilogy is a fictional account of the League of Nations; it traces the strange, convoluted life of a young woman who enters the world of diplomacy in the 1920s, through to her involvement in the newly formed International Atomic Energy Agency after World War II.

== Plot ==
A direct sequel to Grand Days and beginning in 1931, the novel traces the private and public lives of an Australian woman Edith Campbell Berry, during her final years as an official of the League of Nations based in Geneva. Berry's crumbling marriage parallels the futility of the League's attempts at negotiated disarmament, though she is reunited with her former lover, a cross-dressing Englishman. Returning on leave to Australia, Berry finds she now has little in common with her homeland, after her years of moving in European diplomatic circles. She remains with the Secretary-General's Office at the half-empty Palais des Nations throughout World War II, while a skeleton Secretariat attempts to continue the peacetime functions of the League. In 1945 Berry accompanies a delegation of senior League officials to San Francisco, in the expectation that they will all have key roles to play in the newly established United Nations. To her humiliation and anger they are excluded from any involvement in the setting up of the new organization. The League itself is dissolved a few months later and Berry moves to Canberra, aspiring to a new career in the Australian Department of External Affairs (Cold Light).

== Reviews ==
- Howe, Renate (December 2001 – January 2002). "Oral Sex and the League of Nations: The Genre of Faction in Grand Days and Dark Palace". Network Review of Books. Perth: Australian Public Intellectual Network. ISSN 1833-0932. Archived from the original (online) on 29 September 2012.
- Porter, Peter (10 March 2002). "How to be good: Dark Palace". The Guardian. London.

== Awards ==
- Miles Franklin Award, 2001: winner
- In 2001 in a press release the administrators of the Victorian Premier's Literary Awards, the State Library Victoria, erroneously named Dark Palace as the winner of that year's award, when in fact the decision had gone to Peter Carey's True History of the Kelly Gang.

== Portrait ==
A portrait of Frank Moorhouse entitled, "Uncle Frank's Dark Palace" was painted by Prof Wei Cheng (his nephew by marriage), to mark the writer's 80th birthday. Full of symbolism, the huge portrait references the trilogy, “Grand Days" with his favourite martini in reach; a copy of the book "Dark Palace;" while the cold light reflection on his face from the computer screen symbolises the third and final book in the trilogy, "Cold Light."

The initial sitting for the portrait was done in the library of the Royal Automobile Club of Australia in Sydney, where he sat in a favoured corner of the Club which is reflected in the painting's background. For it was in RACA where he wrote for a time, while a resident of the club. He was a member of RACA for 32 years. The portrait was entered in the Archibald Prize 2019. (Oil on Canvas. 2m x 1.5m.)

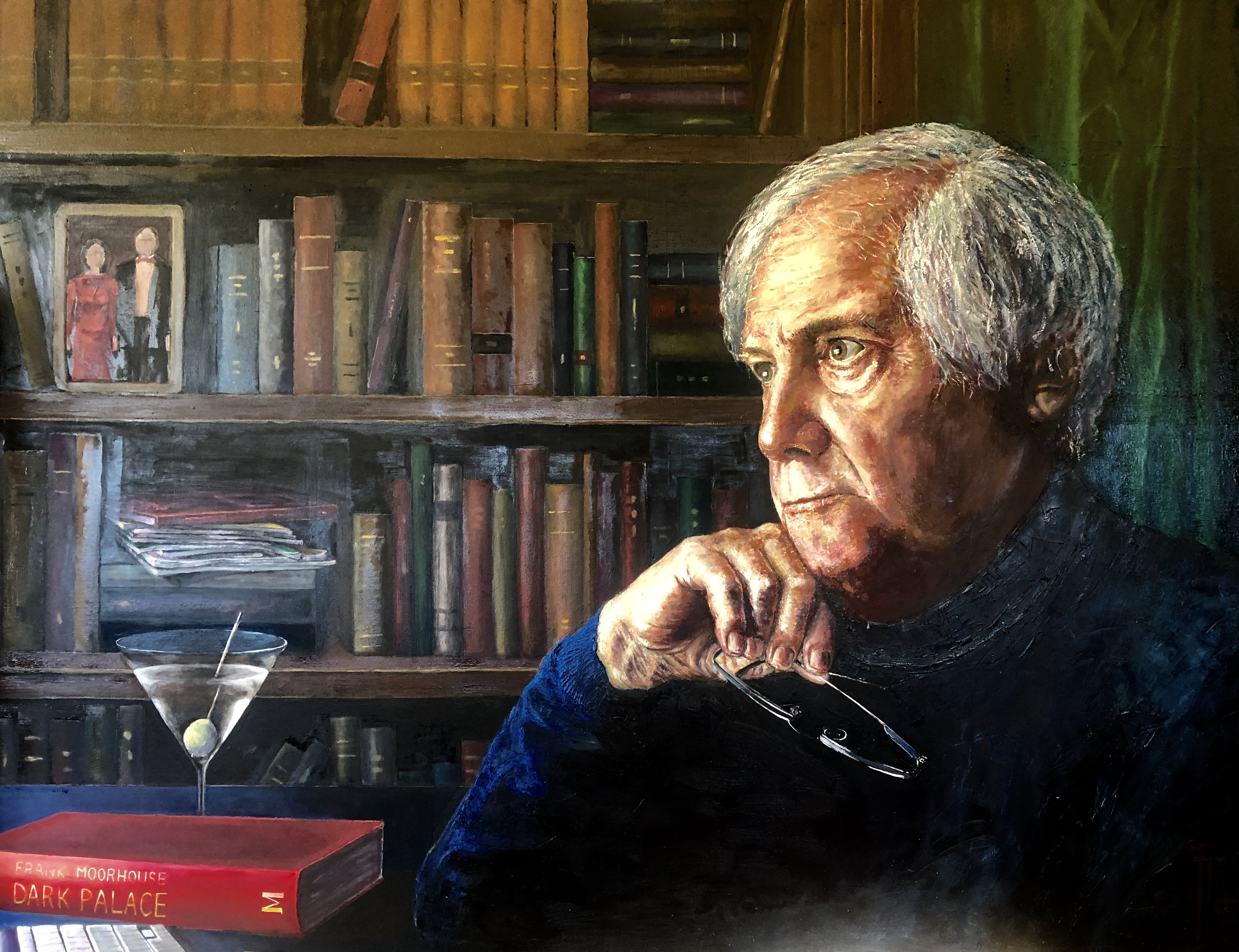
"Uncle Frank’s Dark Palace" – a portrait of Frank Moorhouse by Prof Wei Cheng 郑伟 (2019).
