= Grand Days =

1993 novel by Australian author Frank Moorhouse

- Author: Frank Moorhouse
- Language: English
- Series: Palais des Nations
- Genre: Novel
- Publisher: Macmillan Publishers
- Publication date: 1993
- Publication place: Australia
- Media type: Print
- Pages: 572 pp.
- ISBN: 0732907683
- Followed by: Dark Palace

Grand Days is a 1993 novel by the Australian author Frank Moorhouse.

This novel is the first in the author's Palais des Nations series, and was followed by Dark Palace in 2000 and Cold Light in 2011.

== Synopsis ==
Edith Campbell Berry is a young Australian working for the League of Nations in Geneva, Switzerland, in the 1920s.

== Publishing history ==
After the novel's initial publication in Australia by Macmillan Publishers in 1993, it was reprinted as follows:

- Picador, UK, 1993
- Pantheon Books, USA, 1993
- Picador, Australia, 1994
- Vintage Books, Australia, 2000
- Random House, Australia, 2018

The novel was also translated into French in 1996.

== Critical reception ==
Writing in Australian Book Review Carmel Bird was very impressed with the work: "The novel is a powerful work of the imagination. If Moorhouse had simply written a history of the League, we would have had the facts, but with the novel we actually feel the hope and the disaster of the enterprise. This is a remarkable thing. The historical novels I used to read always took as their subject, I think, the wild and wonderful bits of what has happened on the planet. By opening up the attic of the things that happened in Geneva in the 1920s and 1930s, Frank Moorhouse has done something rare, strange, and important. The overall tone is sad and bitter, but not without a certain preservation of hope in the possibility of goodness and a means to peace."

Alison Broinowski, in The Sydney Morning Herald noted: "The story of how [Edith's] idealistic belief in the league's supranational, super-rational capacity to save the world vaults into ambition and then slides into compromise is as much the story of the league itself as it is the subsequent story of the UN...The mood of the 1920s is so faithfully evoked that Edith's escapades sometimes read like the 'madcap scrapes' of English schoolgirl fiction of the period."

== Awards ==
- Adelaide Festival Awards for Literature winner 1994

== See also ==
- Candida Baker interviewed the author about the book for The Age
- 1993 in Australian literature
