= Dancing on Coral =

1987 Australian novel by Glenda Adams

- First edition
- Author: Glenda Adams
- Language: English
- Genre: Novel
- Publisher: Angus & Robertson (Aus)
- Publication date: 1987
- Publication place: Australia
- Media type: Paperback
- Pages: 291 pp
- ISBN: 0-670-81242-0
- OCLC: 13947149
- Dewey Decimal: 823 19
- LC Class: PR9619.3.A324 D3 1987
- Preceded by: Games of the Strong
- Followed by: Longleg

Dancing on Coral is a Miles Franklin Award-winning novel by Australian author Glenda Adams.

== Synopsis ==
Lark Watter is desperate to leave behind her life in suburban Sydney in the 1960s. At university she meets an American, Tom Brown, and travels with him across the Pacific by freighter to a new life in the USA.

== Critical reception ==
Marion Halligan, in The Canberra Times referred to the novel as a "fine farce" and noted that the author "seems rather more interested in the episodes than the essentials; or maybe she sees herself as hiding the essentials in order to make her readers work at discovery. But I found that the pleasures of this book were in the multiplicity and complexity of its episodes, pleasures which appeal to the intellect as games and puzzles do. Emotions aren't important, amusement is."

== Awards ==
- Miles Franklin Literary Award, 1987: winner
- New South Wales Premier's Literary Awards, Christina Stead Prize for Fiction, 1987: winner

== Notes ==
Parts of this novel first appeared in Lies and Stories and The Hottest Night of the Century.

== See also ==
- 1987 in Australian literature
