= The Cockatoos =

1974 collection of novellas by Patrick White

- First edition
- Author: Patrick White
- Language: English
- Genre: Novella collection
- Publisher: Jonathan Cape
- Publication date: 1974
- Publication place: Australia
- Media type: Print (hardcover)
- Pages: 308
- ISBN: 0-224-00992-3
- Preceded by: The Burnt Ones
- Followed by: Three Uneasy Pieces

The Cockatoos: Shorter Novels and Stories is a collection of six novellas by Australian writer Patrick White, first published by Jonathan Cape in 1974. Cape reprinted the book that same year. This was White's first published work after winning the Nobel Prize for Literature.

The stories are copyright 1966, 1968 and 1974.

The third story, The Night the Prowler, was filmed in 1978. White wrote the script.

== Contents ==
1. A Woman's Hand
2. The Full Belly
3. The Night the Prowler
4. Five-Twenty
5. Sicilian Vespers
6. The Cockatoos
