= Occasions of Birds and Other Poems =

1987 poetry collection by Elizabeth Riddell

- Author: Elizabeth Riddell
- Language: English
- Genre: Poetry collection
- Publisher: Brindabella Press
- Publication date: 1987
- Publication place: Australia
- Media type: Print
- Pages: 44 pp.
- Awards: 1987 Grace Leven Prize for Poetry, winner

Occasions of Birds and Other Poems is a collection of poems by Australian poet Elizabeth Riddell, published by Brindabella Press in Australia in 1987, accompanied by drawings by Anne Wienholt.

The collection contains 24 poems from a variety of sources.

The collection won the 1987 Grace Leven Prize for Poetry.

== Contents ==
- "Kauri"
- "Tom"
- "Graziers' Alert"
- "The Jockey's Story"
- "The Poets"
- "Intimations"
- "Suburban Evening"
- "His Life"
- "Visiting Hobart"
- "The End of the Affair"
- "The Party"
- "Security (for Elaine Haxton)"
- "The Musk Duck"
- "Thursday"
- "The Cat"
- "The Short Life of the Little Cat"
- "Peking Circus on Television"
- "Possibilities in an Airplane"
- "Eclipse of the Moon"
- "The Time of Life"
- "November"
- "Personal Notices"
- "Telephone Call"
- "Occasions of Birds"

== Critical reception ==
In a review of the collection in The Sydney Morning Herald Judith Rodriguez noted: "Some poems I shall treasure from this fine collection use news items – predictions of hard weather that will kill lambs, the vignette of a Chilean soldier sticking carnations in the muzzle of his gun – and go on 'with pain and misgiving' to explore the world's contrarieties...The book is one of Brindabella's most beautiful productions, embellished with drawings by Anne Wienholt; a book-lover's prize."

== Awards ==
- 1987 Grace Leven Prize for Poetry, winner

== See also ==
- 1987 in Australian literature
