= Banjo Paterson Writing Award =

Australian literary award

- Description: Australian literary award for prose, poetry and children’s writing
- Country: Australia

The Banjo Paterson Writing Award is an Australian literary award honouring the legacy of Australian writer Andrew Barton Paterson (1864-1941) and is awarded annually in the categories of prose, poetry and children’s writing. The Banjo Paterson Writing Award is separate from the now-defunct National Book Council Banjo Award.
