= My Father's Moon =

1989 novel by Australian writer Elizabeth Jolley

- Author: Elizabeth Jolley
- Language: English
- Genre: Fiction
- Publisher: Viking
- Publication date: 1989
- Publication place: Australia
- Media type: Print
- Pages: 171 pp.
- ISBN: 0140111255
- Preceded by: The Sugar Mother
- Followed by: Cabin Fever

My Father's Moon (1989) is a novel by Australian writer Elizabeth Jolley. It was originally published by Viking in Australia in 1989.

The novel was the first in the author's Vera Wright trilogy, preceding Cabin Fever (1990) and The Georges' Wife (1993).

== Synopsis ==
During World War II Vera Wright is a young nurse training in a London hospital.

== Critical reception ==
Reviewing the novel for The Canberra Times Marina Eldridge wrote that it "is centred firmly in Britain, Britain of half a century ago in which young Vera Wright comes to London to train as a nurse. Vera's rite of passage is lovingly portrayed as, with great imagination and control, the novel dips and sweeps between the present and the past, one incident recalling another, much as memory functions...Jolley's fans will recognise with pleasure the eccentric incidents and the array of quirky characters.."

Writing about which Australian novel a reader should pick next for The Guardian, Carrie Tiffany chose this book and stated: "It is proof of a fine novel when its characters enter your spirit as you are reading and take up residence there. The experience is akin to falling in love. You are vividly enveloped by thoughts of another. They are alive inside you, perceiving the world with you, breath by breath. It is the most intimate of feelings. Film can't achieve this, or theatre, or visual art; perhaps music gets closest. It's only the novel that can show you the grain of another's soul...Read Elizabeth Jolley's My Father's Moon. You may want to go on and read the Vera Wright trilogy. You may want to go on and read and re-read Elizabeth Jolley, as I do, and as I will continue to do."

== Publication history ==
After its original publication in 1989 in Australia by publisher Viking the novel was later reprinted as follows:

- Harper and Row, USA, 1989
- Penguin, Australia, 2008

The novel was also translated into German in 1994.

== Awards ==
The novel won the Age Book of the Year Award for Fiction (or Imaginative Writing) in 1989.

== See also ==
- 1989 in Australian literature
