= Longleg (novel) =

1990 novel by Glenda Adams

- First edition
- Author: Glenda Adams
- Language: English
- Genre: Novel
- Publisher: Angus and Robertson, Australia
- Publication date: 1990
- Publication place: Australia
- Media type: Paperback
- Pages: 339 pp
- ISBN: 0-207-19016-X
- OCLC: 38382510
- Preceded by: Dancing on Coral
- Followed by: The Tempest of Clemenza

Longleg is a 1990 novel by Australian author Glenda Adams.

== Critical reception ==
Writing in The Canberra Times Marion Halligan commented: "Longleg is not exactly a cheerful book, or rather, its cheerfiilness is the kind that goes with adversity, just as its comedy is mostly dark. Its visions are frequently bleak, and that is part of its power. I was reminded at times of a black-and-white film whose power and beauty are all the more compelling because of the absence of colour, that the shapes of things, their reality, their luminosity, are best perceived through this medium. And that it is in the shadows and their many nuances of grey that subtlety lies."

== Publication history ==
After its initial publication in Australia in 1990 by Angus and Robertson it was reprinted as follows:

- Cane Hill Press, USA, 1992
- Angus & Robertson, Australia, 1995
- HarperCollins, Australia, 2014

== Awards ==
- Miles Franklin Literary Award, 1991: shortlisted
- NBC Banjo Awards, NBC Banjo Award for Fiction, 1991: joint winner
- The Age Book of the Year Award, Imaginative Writing Prize, 1990: winner

== Reviews ==
- "The New York Times" Book review

== See also ==
- 1990 in Australian literature
