= Martini: A Memoir =

Memoir by Frank Moorhouse

- First edition
- Author: Frank Moorhouse
- Language: English
- Genre: Memoir
- Publisher: Random House Australia (Knopf)
- Publication date: 2005
- Publication place: Australia
- Media type: Hardback & Paperback
- Pages: 238 pp
- ISBN: 1-74051-312-6
- Dewey Decimal: 641.874

Martini: A Memoir is both a memoir and a meditation on the martini by the Australian and Miles Franklin Literary Award winning author Frank Moorhouse.

Moorhouse was a guest at international literary festivals in Hong Kong and Shanghai, presenting talks about the martini, in 2003. Michelle Garnaut, the founder of the Shanghai International Literary Festival, invited him to speak at the inaugural festival that year.

== Synopsis ==
Moorhouse uses a selective memoir to frame his meandering (but thorough) meditation on the martini. Or, perhaps, he uses a widely digressive discussion of the martini to frame a selective memoir.

His exchanges, by email, or more often in person at various New York bars, with his friend and martini-aficionado, Voltz, form a thread on which both the memoir and the martini-appreciation hang.

Every aspect of the martini is discussed, from the size and temperature of the glass, through the types of gin (or vodka) that should be used, to the types of wood best used for the sticks on which the salt-pickled olives are skewered. How much vermouth? (From upside-down mainly-vermouth, to Luis Bunuel's 'it is sufficient for sunlight to pass through the vermouth bottle into the gin'. What to do with the olive pits? (Voltz and Moorhouse both favour dropping them into a pocket).

The book is full of humour, with characters as diverse as Winston Churchill, Malcolm Fraser, Ernest Hemingway and Dorothy Parker making appearances.

Episodes from Moorhouse’s colourful life, from childhood, and his time at Wollongong tech, to maturity, including his bisexual relationships and his writer-in-residence positions, often frame moments in the development of his appreciation for the drink. He recounts a particularly touching story of finding that a woman he had read about in his researches in Geneva for Dark Palace (and who indeed was a model for the central character, Edith Campbell Berry) was still living at an advanced age in upstate New York. He visits her, and she asks him 'you must tell me about myself', and he is delighted to find that she, too, loves a martini.

In the chapter titled 'The Thirteen Awarenesses', Moorhouse takes the reader through the stages of enjoying a martini, comparing it to the ritual of the Japanese tea ceremony. It concludes with a reflection on life:

If you are in the mood you may want to leave space also to glance at the other imps that swim in every martini – to feel the delicious bewilderment of being alive on a planet surrounded by unimaginable infinite space and unimaginable time; to experience once again the angst of living with an imperfect intelligence, and incomplete knowledge, and a consciousness prone to all weathers of the soul, and which is unable to answer the fundamental adolescent questions of our children about why we are here, why we exist; to laugh at the dangerous, nonsensical, religious narratives we concoct to handle all this; and the nature of inescapable death. Or you may not, as the case may be.

== Reception and Appreciation ==
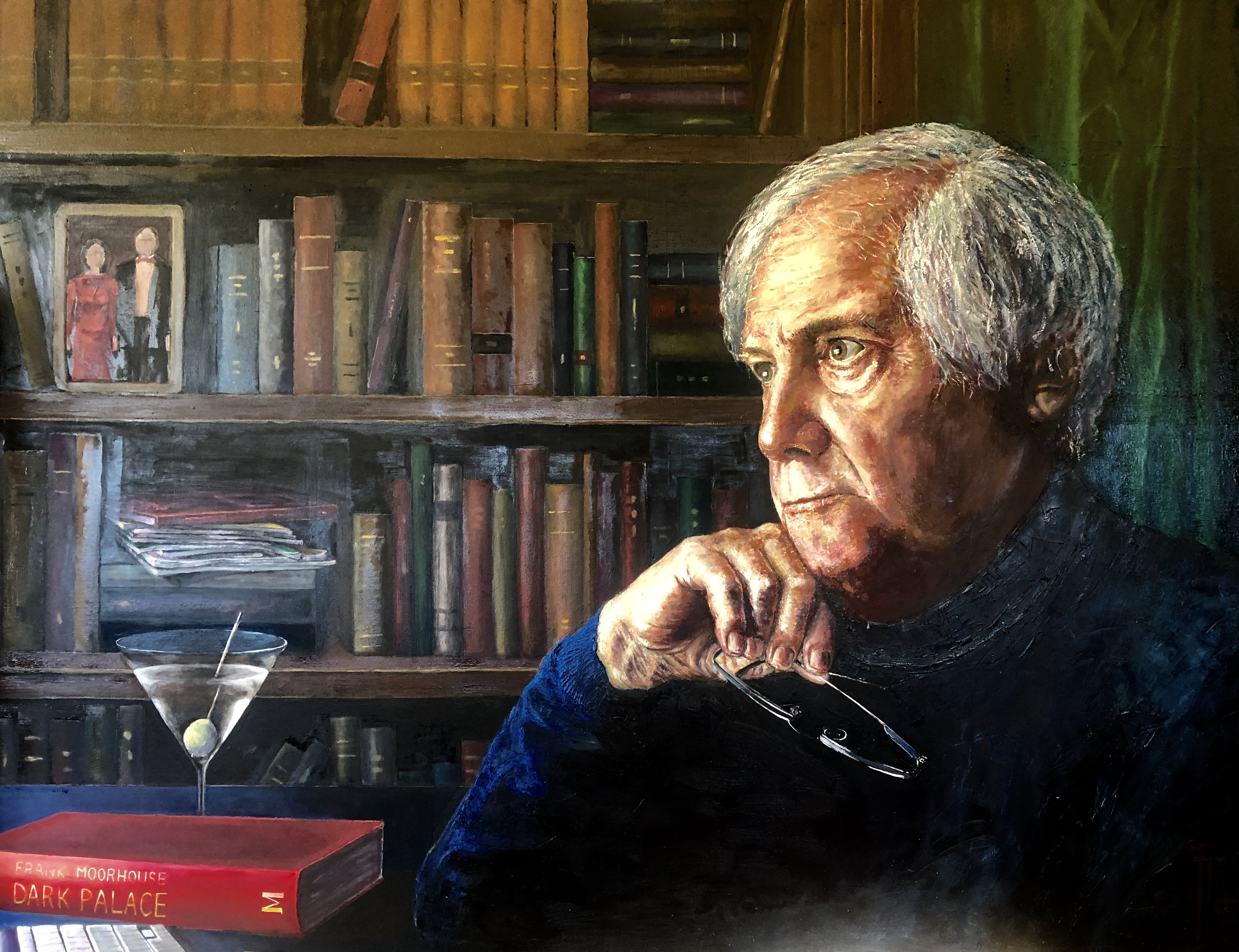
'Uncle Frank's Dark Palace, by Dr Wei Cheng, 2019

In a review in the South China Morning Post in 2006, Alister McMillan notes

Moorhouse, 67, hasn't told all in his memoir. Nor has he added to the self-help shelf with an etiquette guide. Martini records the history and cultural baggage of the cocktail he describes as 'one of the great narratives of modern folklore', and it candidly explores the appearance of the cocktail in his life and writing. But the autobiography and the drink are only the botanicals of this book. Martini is about connoisseurship.

Observations on taste, manners and the full life are rife in Moorhouse's most acclaimed novels, Grand Days and Dark Palace, which both revolve around Edith Campbell Berry, a woman from a small Australian town who becomes cosmopolitan in manners, learning and sex while working for the League of Nations in Geneva.

Catharine Lumby, Moorhouse's biographer, opened her obituary for Moorhouse with a reference to the book:

Frank Moorhouse structured his 2005 semi-fictional memoir Martini around his favourite drink. He was fascinated by the rituals and rules for living well that the martini symbolised.

In Martini, he satirises the ritualism of the drink in a joke titled The Martini Rescue. If you get lost in the bush, he writes, "You do not panic. You do not walk aimlessly. You find a shady spot with a fine view, you sit down, you take out the cocktail shaker, the gin, the vermouth, and the olives from your backpack (which every sophisticated trekker carries) and mix yourself a martini." Within a few minutes someone will appear and say: "That is not the proper way to make a martini."

The question of how many rules we need to live well and in a civilised manner fascinated Moorhouse, and it’s a theme that structures much of his work, culminating in his magnum opus, the League of Nations trilogy.

Sian Cain, in her obituary in the Guardian, observes:

Moorhouse wrote prolifically and with irreverence and humour of his passions – food, drink, travel, sex and gender. Early in his fiction, and later in his 2005 memoir, Martini [sic], he wrote frankly about his own bisexuality and androgyny. In his writing, he said, he wanted to explore "the idea of intimacy without family – now that procreation is not the only thing that gives sex meaning".

A portrait of Moorhouse, "Uncle Frank's Dark Palace" by Dr Wei Cheng (husband of his niece, Karin Moorhouse) was entered in the Archibald Prize in 2019. It features his favourite drink.

The Melbourne Gin Company artisanal distillery was founded in 2012 after winemaker Andrew Marks was inspired by Martini: A Memoir.
