= A Tremendous World in Her Head =

1989 poetry collection by Dorothy Hewett

- Author: Dorothy Hewett
- Language: English
- Genre: Poetry collection
- Publisher: Dangaroo Press
- Publication date: 1989
- Publication place: Australia
- Media type: Print
- Pages: 99 pp.
- Awards: 1989 Grace Leven Prize for Poetry, winner
- ISBN: 1871049857

A Tremendous World in Her Head : Selected Poems is a collection of poems by Australian poet Dorothy Hewett, published by Dangaroo Press in Australia in 1989.

The collection contains 63 poems from a variety of sources. It takes poems that were originally included in the following collections by this author: Windmill Country (1968), Rapunzel in Suburbia (1975), Greenhouse (1979), and Alice in Wormland (1987).

The collection won the 1989 Grace Leven Prize for Poetry.

== Contents ==
- "Country Idyll"
- "Once I Rode with Clancy..."
- "Last Summer"
- "Clancy and Dooley and Don McLeod"
- "Legend of the Green Country"
- "Testament"
- "Memoirs of a Protestant Girlhood : 2"
- "Death of My Mad Mother"
- "This Version of Love"
- "In Moncur Street"
- "The Witnesses"
- "Living Dangerously"
- "Underneath the Arches"
- "Conversations"
- "Grave Fairytale"
- "The Travellers"
- "Madame Bovary"
- "Psyche's Husband"
- "Lay Lady Lay"
- "Anniversary"
- "First Voronezh Letter"
- "Second Voronezh Letter"
- "Third Moscow Letter"
- "Fourth Exile's Letter"
- "Last Letters from the Transport Camp Vitoraya Rechka, Near Vladivostok"
- "Sydney Postscript"
- "Summer Solstice : 2"
- "Summer Solstice : 3"
- "Dedication"
- "Preface"
- The Alice Poems, poetry sequence
  - "1"
  - "2"
  - "5"
  - "10"
  - "11 : 1"
  - "11 : 2"
- The Nim Poems, poetry sequence
  - "11 : 3"
  - "11 : 4"
  - "11 : 5"
  - "11 : 6"
  - "11 : 7"
  - "11 : 12"
- "14"
- "16"
- "Bluey Blood : II (18 : II)"
- "Bluey Blood : IV (18 : IV)"
- "Bluey Blood : V (18 : V)"
- "28"
- "The Lost Boys (34)"
- "36"
- "47 : I"
- "47 : II"
- The Infernal Grove, poetry sequence
  - "48"
  - "The Room (49)"
- "Alice Dying : I (66)"
- "69"
- "70"
- "71"
- "In Summer"
- "On the Peninsula, Part 1"
- "On the Peninsula, Part 2"
- "On the Peninsula, Part 3"
- "On the Peninsula, Part 4"

== Critical reception ==
Reviewing the collection for Westerly magazine Lawrence Bourke noted that the collection "should be warmly welcomed." Of Hewett's work he commented: "one of the claims Dorothy Hewett's poetry has on our interest is its vigorous assertion of the quest, taking for women that which men have traditionally reserved to themselves...Dorothy Hewett's interest goes beyond the reversal of stereotypes and expectations. In her poetry if self-definition comes through social roles, it also closes off other possible selves, other experiences which characters desire. But while roles are a means of social control, they also offer a security of identity."

== Awards ==
- 1989 Grace Leven Prize for Poetry, winner

== Notes ==
- Dedication: To William Grono.
- Epigraph: '- and what have I to leave, but this encumbering tenderness, like gear forever unclaimed.' - Randolph Stow, Ishmael

== See also ==
- 1989 in Australian literature
