= Possible Worlds (Porter collection) =

1989 poetry collection by Peter Porter

- Author: Peter Porter
- Language: English
- Genre: Poetry collection
- Publisher: Oxford University Press
- Publication date: 1989
- Publication place: Australia
- Media type: Print
- Pages: 70 pp
- Awards: ALS Gold Medal 1990
- ISBN: 0192826603
- Preceded by: A Porter Selected: Poems 1959–1989
- Followed by: The Chair of Babel

Possible Worlds is a poetry collection by Australian poet and writer Peter Porter, published by Oxford University Press, in 1989.

The first edition contains 42 poems with some being published here for the first time.

== Dedication ==
- Dedication: For Gavin Ewart
- Epigraph: The trumpet cries / This is the successor of the invisible. / This is its substitute in stratagems / Of the spirit. This, in sight and memory, / Must take place, as what is possible / Replaces what is not. Wallace Stevens, Credences of Summer

== Contents ==
Contents:

- "Next to Nothing"
- "A Physical World"
- "Decus Et Tutamen"
- "Woop Woop"
- "River Run"
- "The Blazing Birds"
- "The Ecstasy of Estuaries"
- "The Wind at Bundanon"
- "A Headland Near Adelaide"
- "Die-Back"
- "A Chagall Postcard"
- "Whitebait"
- "Capital and Interest"
- "Copycat"
- "He Would, Wouldn't He"
- "Serious Drinking"
- "Night Watch"
- "Tabs on Dickinson"
- "The Farewell State"
- "Sacred and Profane"
- "The Unfed Aphorisms"
- "Sonnet after Reading Mallarme (On Mallarme's Answering Machine)"
- "Sun King Sulking"
- "Essay On Patriotism"
- "An Ingrate's England"
- "The Camera Loves Us"
- "Civilization and Its Disney Contents"
- "The Poem to End Poems"
- "A Bunch of Fives (for Kit Wright)"
- "The Little Buddha"
- "Markers"
- "Open-Air Theatre, Regent's Park"
- "They Come Back More"
- "Frogs Outside Barbischio"
- "Porter's Retreat"
- "Musical Murders"
- "The Orchard In E-Flat"
- "Stratagems of the Spirit"
- "Hand in Hand"
- "Talking to the Lizards"
- "Copyright Universal Pictures"
- "The New Mandeville

== Awards ==
- ALS Gold Medal, 1990 winner

== Critical reception ==
Writing in Westerly Lawrence Bourke noted: "Possible Worlds which carries the Poetry Book Society Recommendation is a delight. As with other Porter books the reading of anyone poem gains by reading it alongside others, where recurrent ideas, images and key words illuminate, refer to and sometimes contradict each other, and the difficulties if not entirely massaged away, smooth out enough to reward and entice to further rereading...Unlike those who look for geographical landfall Porter cannot rest with the literal (and limited) discovery; there are always further reaches of self and art, further "possible worlds"; and with Porter much troubled by death since his first book as a thirty-two year old, the tension between rest and voyaging is no less challenged in Possible Worlds published in his sixtieth year."

== Publication history ==
After the initial publication of the collection by Oxford University Press in 1989, it has not been reprinted.

== See also ==
- 1989 in Australian literature
- 1989 in poetry
