= Tom Cole (stockman) =

Australian labourer, stockman and author

Thomas Ernest Cole OAM
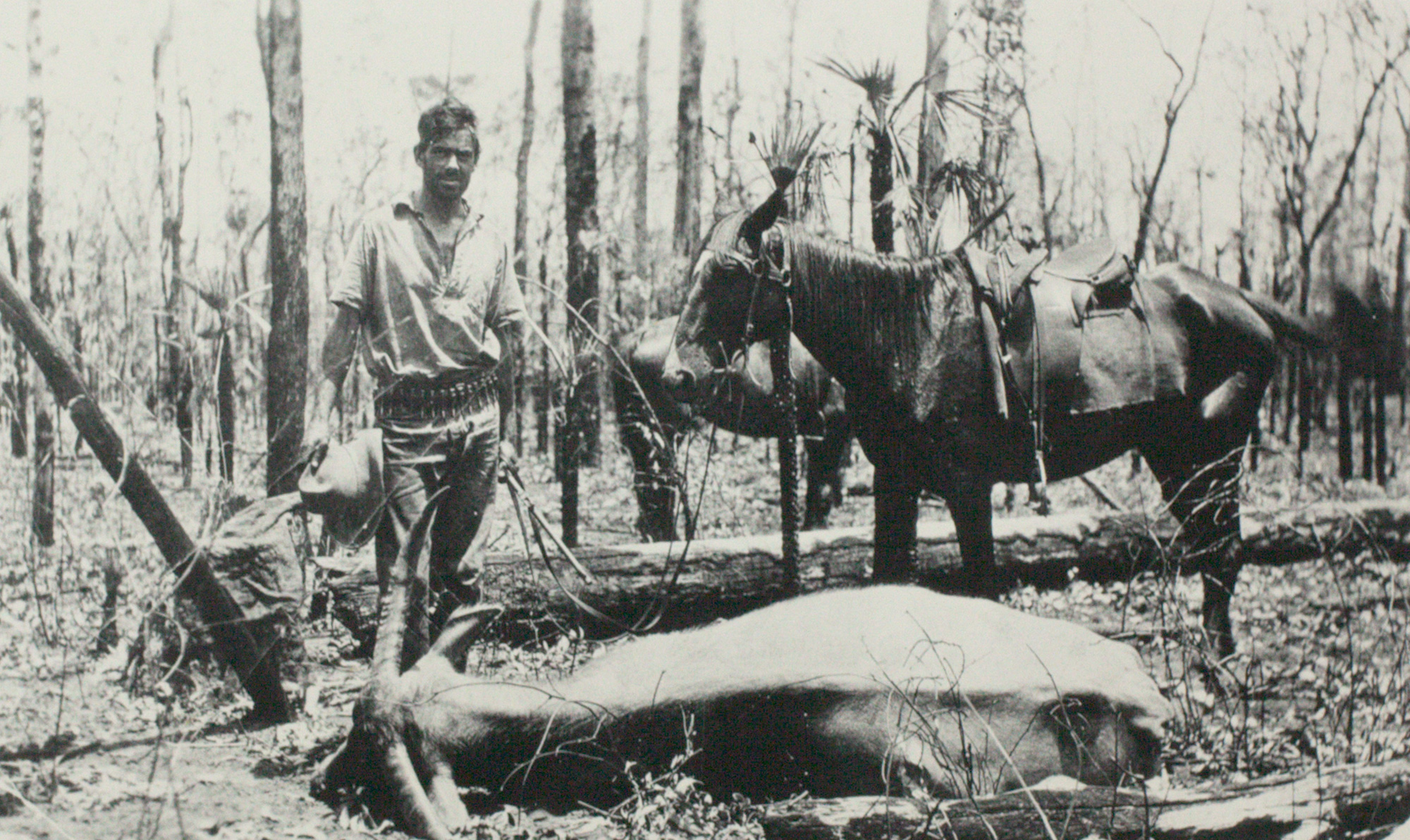
- Tom Cole, buffalo shooter with his horse and a dead buffalo.
- Born: 28 February 1906; London (United Kingdom)
- Died: 9 December 1995 (aged 89)
- Other name: Tom Cole
- Spouse: Kathleen Callen
- Children: 3 daughters

Thomas Ernest Cole OAM (28 February 1906 – 9 December 1995) was a labourer, stockman, buffalo hunter, crocodile shooter, coffee grower, and writer who rode the Australian Northern Territory outback.

== Early life ==
Cole was born on 28 February 1906 in London, the eldest son of Ernest Cole and Adelaide Arundel. In 1923, after a falling out with his father and following World War I, he sailed on board Ormuz to Australia.

== Outback life ==
Cole has been described as the original Australian crocodile dundee, a buffalo shooter, a crocodile hunter and a horseman of the Australian outback.

Cole had started out in Queensland in the Blackall Ranges as a rouseabout or stockman, moving from here to Lake Nash in the Northern Territory and then onto droving cattle down the Birdsville delivering cattle to other states in Australia. He met and worked for many of the big cattle properties.

Cole became acquainted and worked for Jim and Paddy Ambrose from Banka Banka station (Chapter 8 of Hell West and Crooked). He did not have any horse breaking experience until he met Jim and Paddy and had only helped out a few times but was anxious to get the experience.

Cole was put to the task of breaking in horses for Jim and Paddy Ambrose. He broke in horses and was given the pick of one for every four that he broke in.

Cole would also later race horses named Curio and Black Watch at the race at Barrow Creek. Cole and the Ambroses travelled more than 200 miles for the annual race. Arriving at the race Cole thought it was unspirited that a race be convened without booze. A would-be publican had bought a two tonne truck full of liquor and expecting to make a 300% profit, Paddy and Jim purchased the entire outfit, lock-stock-barrel and bottle. The Banka-Banka encampment then became host for the rest of the meeting and were deemed by the rest of the race meeting as "terribly good fellows". Cole rode in three races and managed a 2nd and a 3rd and whilst not winning a race, Jim Ambrose told him "it's the booze and the company that counts".

Cole worked at many jobs in these first few years a cook at Brunette Downs to a position on one of Sidney Kidman's properties. By 1928 he was appointed Head Stockman at Wave Hill Station one of the Vestey's properties. Cole moved around the stations in the early 1930s as a horse breaker with Vestey's.

By 1932 Cole tried buffalo hunting with Harry Hardy and sold horses to other shooters. He continued buffalo hunting, acquiring a lease at Kapalga, near the Wildman River and then in 1937 buying properties near Pine Creek, Goodparla and Esmeralda which his partner stocked with cattle. Gold deposits were later mined at Esmeralda. In 1932, Cole was at Kapalga where he received word from Jack Hales on the Maroubra about two pearling luggers Raf and Myrtle Olpa which had called into Caledon Bay on the Arnhem Coast and the entire crew had been speared. He heard more about the massacre from other lugger crews that called in to load his hides.

=== New Guinea ===
Cole moved to Papua New Guinea in 1950, where he worked as a professional crocodile shooter. He was granted land in 1955 and developed a coffee plantation. He also worked a sawmill for a time.

== Later life ==
Cole returned to Australia after 30 years in Papua New Guinea and began writing memoirs.

In 1994 Cole was awarded the Medal of the Order of Australia for his contribution to history. His publication, Hell West and Crooked sold over 100,000 copies.

Cole died on 9 December 1995, survived by his three daughters. His wife predeceased him in 1987.

== Bibliography ==
Books written by Cole include:

- 1986 - Spears & smoke signals : exciting true tales by a buffalo & croc shooter
- 1988 - Hell West and Crooked
- 1990 - The Last Paradise: Tales of adventures in Papua New Guinea - 1951 - 1964
- 1992 - Riding the Wildman Plains : the letters and diaries of Tom Cole 1923-1943
- 1992 - Crocodiles and other characters

== See also ==
- List of famous big game hunters
