= Sally Morrison (writer) =

Australian writer

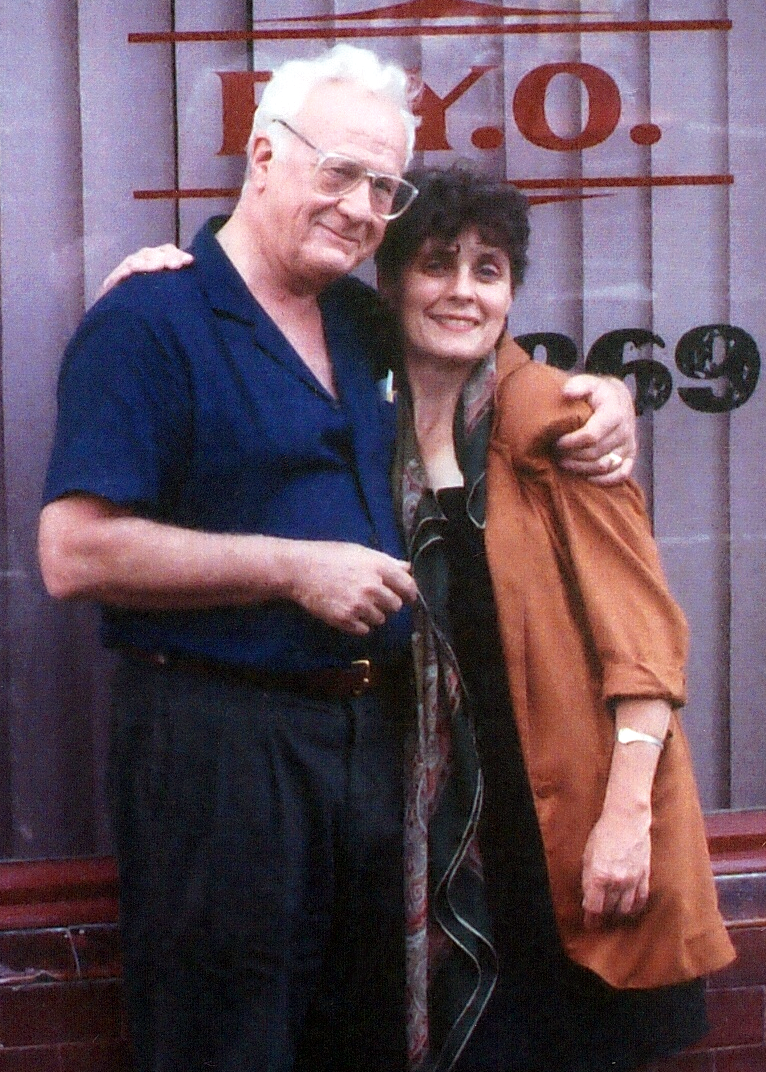
Clifton Pugh and Sally Morrison outside the Comedy Café in Smith St, Fitzroy, Victoria, Australia.

Sally Morrison (born 29 June 1946) is an Australian writer of fiction and biography. She was born in Sydney NSW in 1946 but her family moved to Canberra when her father moved there for a position in the federal public service.

Sally Morrison has been a writer all her life, however, she spent her professional career as a molecular biologist at the University of Melbourne.

== Writing career ==
She started writing in the early 70s when she had a play "Hag" directed by Richard Wherrett at the 1976 National Playwrights Festival.

This was followed by her first novel Who's Taking You to the Dance? in 1979 and in 1989 a collection of stories, I Am a Boat. Her novel Mad Meg won the 1995 Australian National Book Council's Banjo Award and since then there have been two more novels: Against Gravity and The Insatiable Desire of Injured Love.

She has also written a biography of the Australian painter Clifton Pugh, published in 2009 by Hardie Grant, Australia.

Sally Morrison's new novel Window Gods, a sequel to Mad Meg, was published in October 2014 by Hardie Grant in Australia and UK.

== Other activities ==
Recent activities include a presentation made at a Symposium organised by the Royal Society of Victoria within the Department of Microbiology and Infectious Diseases, University of Melbourne, on 18 April 2009 to recognise the life's work of Professor Nancy Millis and a floor talk The art of Moochin' at the NGV Ian Potter Gallery on 7 August 2010

== Works ==
- 1976 Hag: A Play in Three Acts (unpublished manuscript)
- 1979 Who's Taking You to the Dance? ISBN 0-9597008-7-0
- 1989 I am a Boat: Stories ISBN 0-86914-070-1
- 1995 Mad Meg ISBN 0-85561-532-X
- 1998 Against Gravity ISBN 0-09-183658-1
- 2002 The insatiable desire of injured love ISBN 0733615139
- 2009 After Fire: A Biography of Clifton Pugh ISBN 978-1-74066-611-4
- 2014 Window Gods: truth sleeps in the seed ISBN 9781742709208 and 1743582846 (E-Book)

== Awards ==
1995 Australian National Book Council's Banjo Award for Mad Meg.
