= The Domesticity of Giraffes =

1987 poetry collection by Judith Beveridge

- Author: Judith Beveridge
- Language: English
- Genre: Poetry collection
- Publisher: Black Lightning Press
- Publication date: 1987
- Publication place: Australia
- Media type: Print
- Pages: 80 pp
- Awards: Mary Gilmore Award, New South Wales Premier's Literary Awards, Victorian Premier's Literary Awards
- ISBN: 0949561088
- Preceded by: -
- Followed by: Accidental Grace

The Domesticity of Giraffes is a poetry collection by Australian poet Judith Beveridge, published by Black Lightning Press, in 1987. It was the author's debut poetry collection.

The first edition contains 49 poems, several of which had been published previously in various newspapers and poetry publications.

== Contents ==
- "The Domesticity of Giraffes"
- "Flamingo Park"
- "Making Perfume"
- "For Rilke"
- "Girl Swinging"
- "Catching Webs"
- "Orb Spider"
- "Fox in a Tree Stump"
- "The Lyre Birds"
- "Marsupial"
- "The Caterpillars"
- "Monarch Butterflies (for Yvette Christianse)"
- "Ladybirds"
- "Child Fishing"
- "The Fishermen"
- "Reels"
- "Mud Crabs, Low Tide"
- "Mulla Bulla Beach"
- "Eyepiece"
- "Japanese Cranes"
- "At the End of the Day"
- "Situation"
- "Last Walk"
- "On Polling Day"
- "The Bee Keeper"
- "White Peacock"
- "The Herons"
- "In the Park"
- "Walking in the Angophora Forest at Night"
- "Wind"
- "Streets of Chippendale"
- "The Two Brothers"
- "Dining Out (After Gilbert Sorrentino) (for Chris)"
- "Flower of Flowers"
- "Chinese Explorer in Africa: 15th Century"
- "Hannibal on the Alps"
- "The Eunuch's Lament"
- "The Blue Bulb"
- "Address from the Curved City"
- "The Fall of Angels"
- "The Dispossessed Angels"
- "Angel-Glass (for Dorothy Porter)"
- "The Clerical Angel"
- "Performing Angels"
- "Mirrors"
- "My Name"
- "The Workday"
- "The Book of Birds"
- "Invitation"

== Critical reception ==
Joan M. Davis, reviewing the collection for LiNQ journal, noted: "Underlining Beveridge's approach is the celebration of domesticity. This poet has the courage of her convictions, which gives a deft touch to her perceptions. Domesticity is of the world seen and recorded now, one element operating in the marketplace and valid as the stuff of poetry...There is much to reward the reader in this first collection: Judith Beveridge is a developing and competent Australian poet."

== Publication history ==
After the initial publication of the collection by Black Lightning Press in 1987, it was reprinted by Picaro Press in 2007.

== Awards ==
- Mary Gilmore Award 1988, winner
- New South Wales Premier's Literary Awards 1988, winner
- Victorian Premier's Literary Awards 1988 winner

== See also ==
- 1987 in Australian literature
