= Under Berlin =

1988 poetry collection by John Tranter

Under Berlin : New Poems 1988
- Author: John Tranter
- Language: English
- Genre: Poetry collection
- Publisher: University of Queensland Press
- Publication date: 1988
- Publication place: Australia
- Media type: Print
- Pages: 119 pp.
- Awards: 1988 Grace Leven Prize for Poetry, winner; 1989 NSW Premier's Literary Award – Kenneth Slessor Prize for Poetry, winner
- ISBN: 0702221376

Under Berlin : New Poems 1988 is a collection of poems by Australian poet John Tranter, published by Angus and Robertson in Australia in 1988.

The collection contains 68 poems from a variety of sources.

The collection won the 1988 Grace Leven Prize for Poetry, and the 1989 NSW Premier's Literary Award – Kenneth Slessor Prize for Poetry.

== Contents ==
- "Backyard"
- "House and Home : Country Veranda : 1 : Dry Weather"
- "House and Home : Country Veranda : 2 : Rain"
- "The Pool"
- "The Bedroom Mirrors"
- "North Light"
- "Widower"
- "South Coast After Rain, 1960"
- "Luck"
- "Breath"
- "Sammy's Song"
- "Crocodile Rag"
- "Debbie & Co"
- "Moonie"
- "Voodoo"
- "The Guides"
- "Fine Arts"
- "Bathyscape"
- "Cabin Fever"
- "Shadow Boxing"
- "Cruising Height"
- "Braille"
- "The Creature from the Black Lagoon"
- "Spark"
- "High School Confidential"
- "Stratocruiser"
- "Glow-Boys"
- "Letter to America"
- "On Looking into the American Anthology"
- "Laminex"
- "Having Completed My Fortieth Year"
- "Lufthansa"
- "Shadow Detail"
- "Parallel Lines"
- "Those Gods Made Permanent"
- "During the War"
- "1 : Childhood"
- "Boarding School"
- "Papyrus"
- "After the Dance"
- "Party Line, 1956"
- "Haberdashery"
- "Poolside"
- "Spin-the-Bottle"
- "Three Hand - Coloured Photographs"
- "Crosstalk"
- "At the Newcastle"
- "The Little Engine"
- "Sonnet: Country Music"
- "Affairs of the Heart"
- "Delirium"
- "Lullaby (Sonnet : Lullaby)"
- "Trolley"
- "Life Class"
- "Dirty Weekend"
- "Khaki"
- "Modern Art"
- "Malaya, 1926"
- "La Pulqueria"
- "Hack Writer"
- "The Subtitles"
- "Californian Poppies"
- "Sail Away"
- "Halothane"
- "The Latin Motto"
- "Uniform"
- "Alexandria"
- "Cicada Gambit (in Memoriam Martin Johnston)"

== Critical reception ==
Reviewing the collection in The Sydney Morning Herald Heather Cam commented: "In a world where reactor alarms, radar screens, and military control panels play such a crucial role, inanimate technological devices assume a new and alarming significance. Tranter's poems are menacingly alive with these latter-day toys. He has the knack of endowing things with an uncanny, yet utterly convincing life of their own."

In The Age Tony Linterman noted that there are some "beautiful poems" in this collection. He went on: "Sometimes the dominant tone of a poem is ruptured by an intrusive self-consciousness, self-parody which deliberately distances the reader. The best poems here trust themselves, fly straight from the troubled heart without the safety nets of irony or mocking bravura."

== Awards ==
- 1988 Grace Leven Prize for Poetry, winner
- 1989 NSW Premier's Literary Award – Kenneth Slessor Prize for Poetry, winner

== See also ==
- 1988 in Australian literature
