= My Lady Tongue =

1988 short story by Lucy Sussex

- Short story by Lucy Sussex
- Country: Australia
- Language: English
- Genre(s): Science Fiction

Publication
- Published in: Matilda at the Speed of Light : An Anthology of Australian Science Fiction edited by Damien Broderick
- Publication type: Anthology
- Media type: Print
- Publication date: 1988

"My Lady Tongue" is a science fiction short story by Australian writer Lucy Sussex. It was first published in Matilda at the Speed of Light : An Anthology of Australian Science Fiction edited by Damien Broderick.

== Plot summary ==
The story is a love story set in a segregated wymen's utopia in a possible future Australia.

== Critical reception ==
Writing in Thyme reviewer Marc Ortlieb noted that this "is a love story where freedom of choice is shown to be a valued option. It does not allow itself to be tied to possible stereotypes." He concluded: " It lays to rest the idea that Australian academic science fiction is dry and humourless."

== Publication history ==
After the story's initial publication in Matilda at the Speed of Light in 1988, it was included in the following publications:

- My Lady Tongue & Other Tales by Lucy Sussex, William Heinemann, Australia, 1990
- The Women Who Walk Through Fire: Women's Fantasy & Science Fiction Vol. 2 edited by Susanna J. Sturgis, The Crossing Press, 1990
- Mortal Fire: Best Australian SF edited by Terry Dowling and Van Ikin, Coronet Books, 1993
- Centaurus: The Best of Australian Science Fiction edited by Damien Broderick and David G. Hartwell, Tor, 1999
- Matilda Told Such Dreadful Lies: The Essential Lucy Sussex by Lucy Sussex, Triconderoga, 2011
- Strange Horizons, 29 April 2013

== Award ==
- Australian SF Achievement Award, Best Australian Short Fiction, winner, 1989

== See also ==
- 1988 in Australian literature
