= Final Things =

1987 short story collection by John Sligo

- Author: John Sligo
- Language: English
- Genre: Literary story collection
- Publisher: Penguin
- Publication date: 1987
- Publication place: Australia
- Media type: Print
- Pages: 337 pp.
- Awards: 1988 New South Wales Premier's Literary Awards — Christina Stead Prize for Fiction, winner
- ISBN: 0140098801

Final Things is a 1987 story collection by the Australian/New Zealand author John Sligo, originally published in Australia by Penguin.

The collection consists of 3 novellas, titled "A New Eden?", "Going Home", and "Burnham Camp".

It was the winner of the 1988 New South Wales Premier's Literary Awards, Christina Stead Prize for Fiction.

== Synopsis ==
Each of the novellas in this collection deals with the conflicts and consequences that arise in small, conservative New Zealand communities when outsiders move in.

== Critical reception ==
In The Sydney Morning Herald, a reviewer commented about the stories that "All three are crafted with skill and a particular sensitivity to the undercurrents of everyday life."

Mark Roberts, for The Age Monthly Review noted that "Sliogo has created an impressive, and for the most part, subtle triptych of the tensons which underlie contemporary New Zealand, and indeed Australian, society. Its major fault is that, at times, he feels the need to reinforce his message with signposts which, in the final instance, prove unnecessary and instrusive."

== See also ==
- 1987 in Australian literature

== Notes ==
- Dedication: For Annabel Ross / Hayat Mathews de Madariaga / Rose Creswell - a circle closed
- Epigraph: Nel suo profondo vidi che s'interna, / legato con amore in un volume, / cio che per l'universo si squaderna. / La forma universal di questo nodo / credo ch'io vidi, perche piu-di largo / dicendo questo, mi sento ch'io godo Dante - Paradiso XXXIII
- Author's note: The pages of experience are scattered, as Dante noted, yet joined into a coherence which creates a sense of trilogy. Characters come and go, interwoven in intention but not by plot.

== Awards ==
- 1988 New South Wales Premier's Literary Awards, winner
