= Broken Words =

1988 novel by Australian author Helen Hodgman

- Alternate title for Broken Words of Ducks
- Author: Helen Hodgman
- Language: English
- Genre: Literary novel
- Publisher: Penguin
- Publication date: 1988
- Publication place: Australia
- Media type: Print
- Pages: 121 pp.
- Awards: 1989 New South Wales Premier's Literary Awards — Christina Stead Prize for Fiction, winner
- ISBN: 0140102345

Broken Words is a 1988 novel by the Australian author Helen Hodgman, originally published in Australia by Penguin. It is also known by the alternative title Ducks, under which it was published in the USA.

It was the winner of the 1989 New South Wales Premier's Literary Awards, Christina Stead Prize for Fiction.

== Synopsis ==
Hazel, from the small Queensland town of Goondiwindi, lives on the dole in London in the late 1980s. This novel, in a fractured narrative, tells her story and the story she interacts with.

== Critical reception ==
Reviewing the novel for The Sydney Morning Herald Catherine Kenneally found it to be "bleak, funny and savage". She continued "Not only are words broken in this novel, but hearts, minds and bodies as well."

== Publication history ==
After the novel's initial publication in Australia by Penguin Books it was reprinted as follows:

- Harmony Books, USA, 1988 (with the title Ducks)
- Virago Press, UK, 1989
- Anchor, Australia, 1997

== Notes ==
- Dedication: With thanks to Barbara Bridges, Jane Cameron, Irma Havlicek, Roger Hodgman, Suzanne Perkins and Nathan and special thanks to Colin Haycroft for the punctuation and to Meredith Hodgman for the ducks.

== Awards ==
- 1989 New South Wales Premier's Literary Awards, winner

== See also ==
- 1988 in Australian literature
