= Cold Light (novel) =

Book by Frank Moorhouse

- Author: Frank Moorhouse
- Language: English
- Publisher: Random House, Australia
- Publication date: 2011
- Publication place: Australia
- Media type: Print (Hardback and Paperback)
- Pages: 719
- ISBN: 9781742753881
- Preceded by: Dark Palace

Cold Light is a 2011 novel by Australian novelist Frank Moorhouse which won the 2012 Queensland Literary Award. The novel forms the third part of the author's "Edith Trilogy", following Grand Days that was published in 1993, and Dark Palace that was published in 2000.

== Notes ==
- Dedication: To David Elliott Gyger, OAM, editor, opera critic - my first mentor, who, when I was young, introduced me to all that is best in traditional American liberal values, arts, thought and manners - and much more. And to Owen Harris, professor, foreign affairs analyst, editor, ambassador, friend and advisor over many years and, together with his wife, Dorothy, charming dinner table companions.

== Reviews ==
- The Monthly
- The Sydney Morning Herald

== Awards and nominations ==
- 2012 shortlisted Barbara Jefferis Award
- 2012 shortlisted Miles Franklin Literary Award
- 2012 winner Queensland Literary Award
- 2013 longlisted International Dublin Literary Award
- 2013 shortlisted New South Wales Premier's Literary Awards — Christina Stead Prize for Fiction
- 2014 winner Adelaide Festival Awards for Literature — Award for Fiction
