= Royal Automobile Club of Australia building =

Heritage-listed building in Sydney, Australia

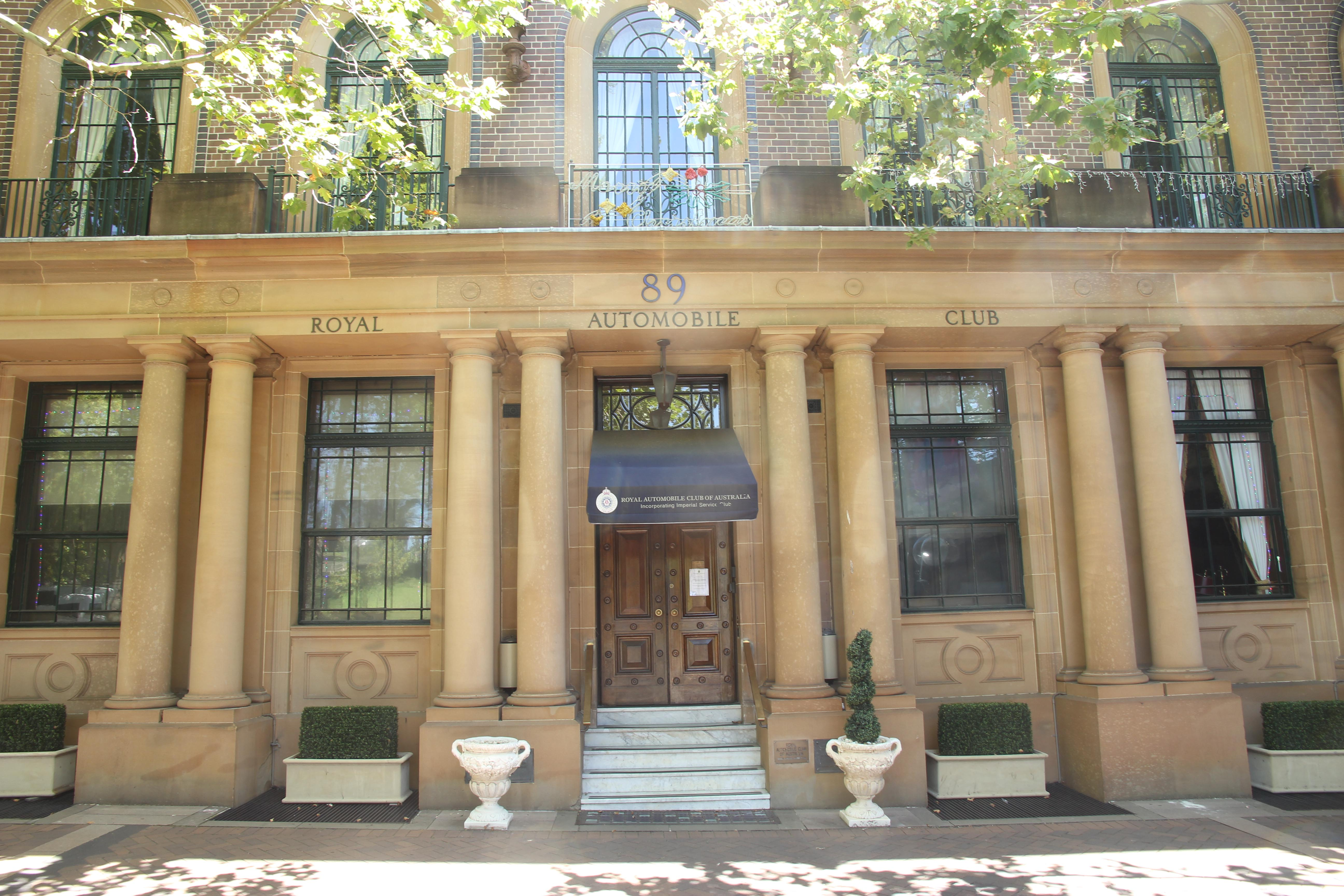
- Royal Automobile Club of Australia Macquarie Street portico, pictured in 2019

- Location within Sydney Location within Australia
- 33.8618°S 151.2127°E
- Location: 89–91 Macquarie Street, Sydney, City of Sydney, New South Wales, Australia

History
- Built: 1926–1928

Site notes
- Architect(s): H. E. Ross and Rowe
- Architectural style: Interwar Commercial Palazzo
- Owner: Royal Automobile Club of Australia

New South Wales Heritage Register
- Official name: Royal Automobile Club
- Type: State heritage (built)
- Designated: 2 April 1999
- Reference no.: 700
- Type: Historic site

Royal Automobile Club of Australia building is a heritage-listed clubhouse located at 89–91 Macquarie Street, Sydney, City of Sydney, New South Wales, Australia. It was designed by H. E. Ross and Rowe and built from 1926 to 1928 by William Hughes and Co. It was added to the New South Wales State Heritage Register on 2 April 1999.

== History ==
The Automobile Club of Australia, formed in Sydney on 20 March 1903, was the first motoring association in Australia. It was followed later in 1903 by state associations in South Australia and Victoria and in 1905 by Queensland, Western Australia and Tasmania. Although the initial impulse for forming the ACA was the protection of motorists against tiresome restrictions, it quickly turned to wider activities, including road races and reliability trials.

The Club met initially in a city hotel, then from 1906 to 1908 in a room over a garage at 109 Elizabeth Street and from 1908 until 1914 in the basement of Challis House in Martin Place. With increasing membership the Club bought its own 3-storied premises at 132 Phillip Street in 1914, but during World War I motoring virtually ceased and expansion was delayed until 1919, when the Club became the Royal Automobile Club and acquired 134 Phillip Street as sleeping accommodation for country members.

In 1922–1923 a new site was purchased at 89–91 Macquarie Street. A member, the architect Ruskin Rowe of H.E. Ross and Rowe, designed the new building and supervised its construction by William Hughes and Co as a goodwill gift. Building began in 1926 and the Club was opened by the Governor of New South Wales on 23 March 1928. The two lowest floors were garages, with lifts installed by Major, Stevens and Coates Ltd (replaced in 1947). The terrazzo staircase was by Melocco Bros and the wall tiling beside the staircase by the Australian Tesselated Tile Co.

This was followed by a difficult period of economic depression and the Club rather stagnated until after World War II, when a series of major alterations were made, most notably to floors 3, 5 and 6 in 1961 by Crane, Scott and Ferris in 1963–1973 by Rudder, Littlemore and Rudder. The second-storey windows on Albert Street were bricked up in 1961. Although the building had been designed to allow for the construction of four more stories and, although plans for two extra stories were drawn up and published in 1953, the aspiration was never realised.

== Description ==
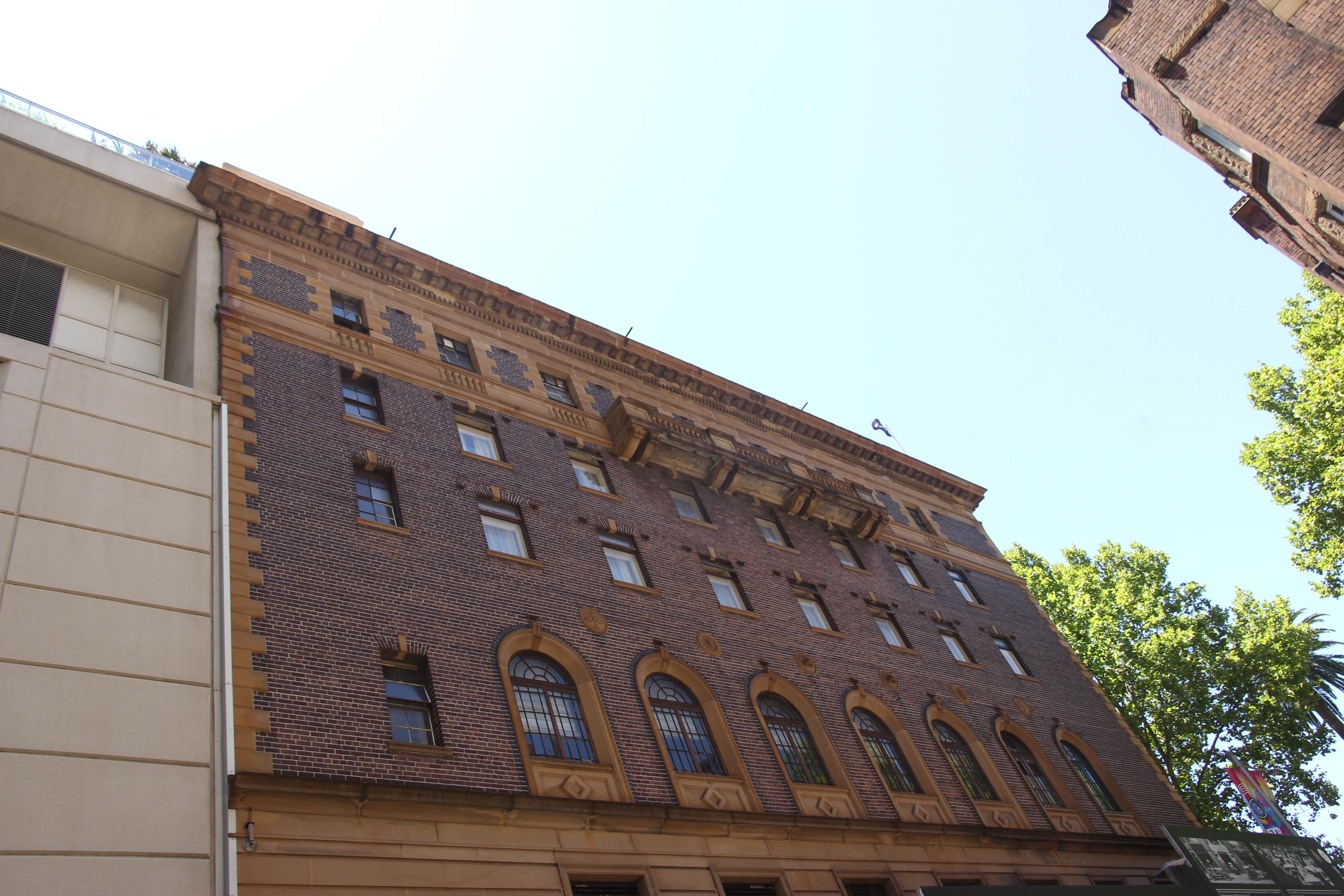
The Albert Street upper facade of the RAC building, pictured in 2019.

The Royal Automobile Club of Australia building is a five-storey building with three basement levels which occupies an important site on the corner of Macquarie and Albert Streets. It is a fine and characteristic example of the Interwar Commercial Palazzo style used for major commercial buildings both locally and overseas, particularly in the United States. The major facades are divided into the characteristic three-part classical/Italianate division and feature dark face brickwork with lighter coloured sandstone dressings to the five stories of the main building. A fine stone colonnade lines the main Macquarie Street elevation and has an accessible terrace with wrought iron balustrade. Steel-framed French doors give access from the first floor. On the rear elevation both the main ground floor level and three below this (levels 1–3 + basement carpark) have cement rendered walls and much of the detailing of the upper brick walls is also in render. Though largely intact externally, the building has had a number of internal alterations and extensive redecoration particularly to the residential accommodation, function rooms and service areas and the original basement car park.

== Significance ==
The RAC building is an important and relatively rare surviving example of a purpose built gentleman's club from the early 20th century and continues to provide a number of its key original services and facilities for members. It is also significant as the home of the first motoring association in Australia – the Automobile Club of Australia of 1903 (later the Royal Automobile Club) – and it is strongly associated with this function in the community. The building is also socially significant through its long tradition of providing overnight accommodation for visiting country members.

The RAC building is a particularly fine example of Interwar Commercial Palazzo providing a casebook example of the features and aesthetic aspirations of this architectural style, as transposed from the United States to Australian – and here particularly Sydney – conditions. This aesthetic/architectural significance is enhanced by the relatively high degree of intactness of the building's major features and fabric, particularly on the main exterior elevations, including the face-brick and stonework, steel windows and doors, and the fine stone and wrought iron colonnade. Internally, key spaces such as the main entry hall with its marble floor and column cladding, the dining room with its coffered ceiling and lead-light glazed dome and major function and circulation areas provide richly detailed spaces which retain much important original character and fabric. The building is also a good representative example of the work of its architects H. E. Ross and Rowe, a leading Sydney firm of the Interwar Period.

The building's aesthetic significance is also enhanced by its key location on the corner of Macquarie and Albert Streets and the care with which the building's massing and facade detailing relate to and exploit its site. The overall scale/massing, materials, detailing and Neo-classical inspired detailing of the building also assist its sympathetic integration into the Macquarie Street streetscape with its large number of important late 19th and early 20th century buildings.

== Heritage listing ==
The Royal Automobile Club was listed on the New South Wales State Heritage Register on 2 April 1999.

== See also ==
- Australian non-residential architectural styles
