= Glenda Adams =

Australian writer (1939–2007)

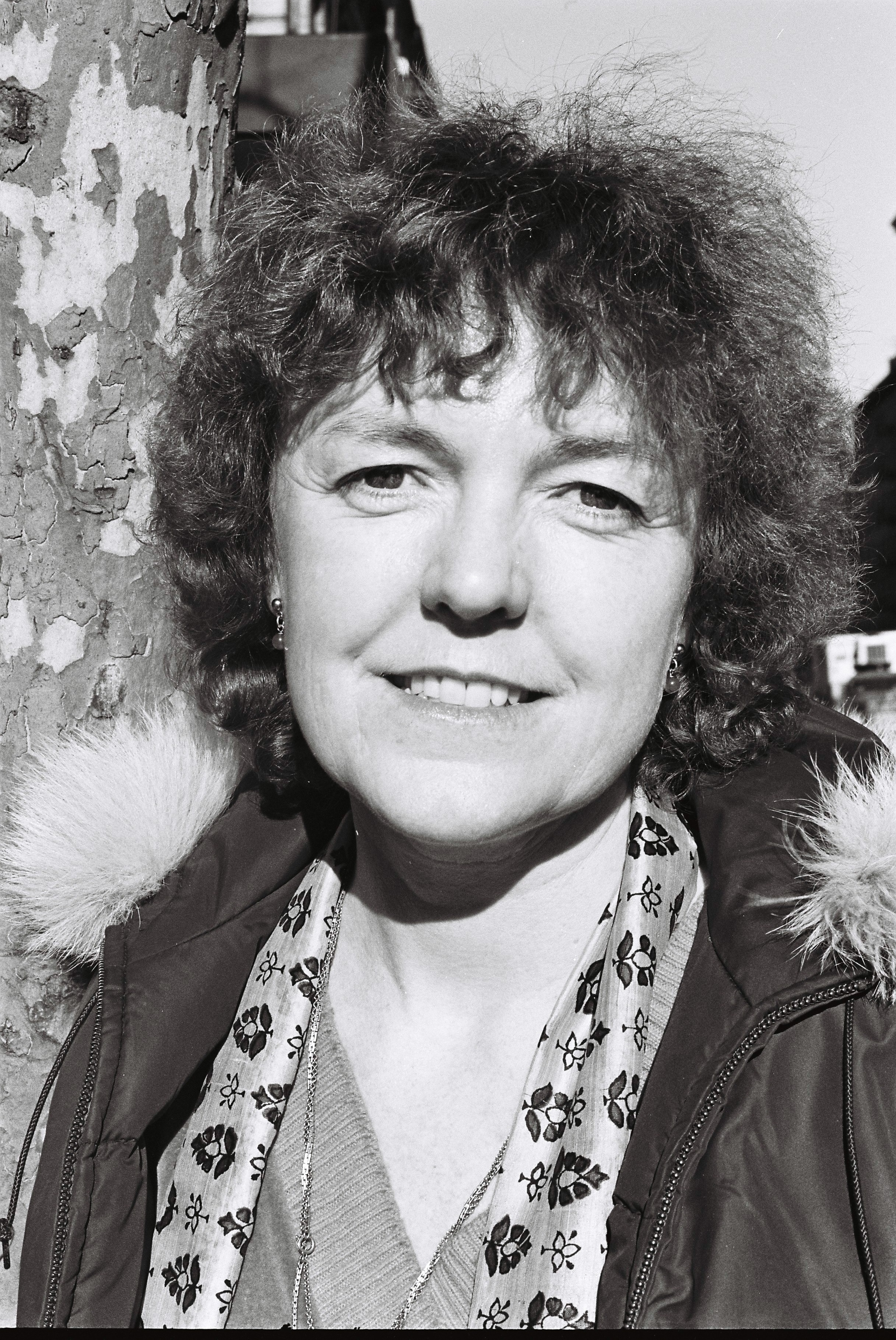
- Born: Glenda Emilie Felton; 30 December 1939; Ryde, New South Wales
- Died: 11 July 2007 (aged 67); East Redfern, Sydney
- Occupations: Novelist and short story writer; Teacher of creative writing
- Spouse: Gordon Adams (divorced)
- Partner: Chris Clarke
- Children: Caitlin Adams

Glenda Emilie Adams (née Felton; 30 December 1939 – 11 July 2007) was an Australian novelist and short story writer, probably best known as the winner of the 1987 Miles Franklin Award for Dancing on Coral. She was a teacher of creative writing, and helped develop writing programs.

Adams' work is found in her own books and short story collections, in numerous short story anthologies, and in journals and magazines. Her essays, stories and articles have been published in, among other magazines, Meanjin, The New York Times Book Review, Panorama, Quadrant, Southerly, Westerly, The Sydney Morning Herald, The Observer and The Village Voice.

== Life ==
Glenda Emilie Felton was born in Ryde, New South Wales, a suburb of Sydney, the younger of two children. She attended Fort Street Primary School for two years and Sydney Girls High School before going to the University of Sydney from which she graduated with an honours degree in Indonesian.

She was a cousin of Australian Prime Minister, John Howard, but held opposing political views and wanted to become a political journalist. She moved to New York City when she won a scholarship to study at Columbia University Graduate School of Journalism and graduated in 1965. During this time, she met Gordon Adams, a political scientist at Columbia. They married in 1967 and had a daughter, Caitlin, before divorcing.

She worked as a lecturer at a number of tertiary institutions, including Columbia University and Sarah Lawrence College, before returning to Australia and the University of Technology, Sydney. Her subject was writing skills and creative writing. She helped design the master of arts writing program at the university, a program which became a model for postgraduate writing programs throughout Australia. For the rest of her life, she traveled regularly between New York to see her daughter and teach at Columbia, and Sydney. Glenda Adams died on 11 July 2007 in Sydney, following a battle with ovarian cancer and secondary brain tumours. Her funeral was held on 18 July. She was posthumously awarded the biennial ASA Medal of the Australian Society of Authors.

== Literary career ==
Adams started writing at the age of 10, with the encouragement of her mother.

While at Columbia University, she joined a fiction workshop and started writing using her real name, after using a male name prior to that to prevent her friends knowing she was writing fiction. Her short stories were published in such magazines as Ms., The Village Voice and Harper's.

After 16 years away, she returned to Australia and became writer-in-residence at the University of Western Australia, the University of Adelaide, and Macquarie University. Her literary friends included Australians Robert Drewe and Kate Grenville (who she supervised as a graduate student at the University of Technology, Sydney), and the American Grace Paley.

In 1987, her second novel, Dancing on Coral won the Miles Franklin Award and the New South Wales Premier's Literary Award but a residential rule for the latter resulted in her being denied it. Instead, the prize money was used for a fellowship for a young writer and she was compensated with a special award (with no money attached). Her third novel, Longleg, published in 1990, was also an award-winner. Her fourth novel, The Tempest of Clemenza was published in both Australia and the United States in 1996, and in 1998, her play, The Monkey Trap, was performed at the Griffin Theatre, in Sydney.

== Awards ==
- 1991: National Book Council Banjo Award for Fiction, Joint Winner for Longleg
- 1990: The Age Book of the Year Award for Imaginative Writing for Longleg
- 1987: Miles Franklin Award for Dancing on Coral
- 1987: New South Wales Premier's Literary Awards, Special Award for Dancing on Coral.
- 2007: ASA Medal

== Legacy ==
University of Technology Sydney sponsors the UTS Glenda Adams Award for New Writing, which is one of the New South Wales Premier's Literary Awards. Formerly the UTS Award for New Writing, the award was renamed in 2008 to honour Adams.

== Bibliography ==
=== Novels ===
- Games of the Strong (1982)
- Dancing on Coral (1987)
- Longleg (1990)
- The Tempest of Clemenza (1996)

=== Short story collections ===
- Lies and Stories (1976)
- The Hottest Night of the Century (1979)

=== Scripts ===
- Pride (1993)
- Wrath (1993)
- The Monkey Trap commissioned by Griffin Theatre, Sydney (1998)
