= Mary K. Pershall =

Australian children's writer

- Born: Mary Katherine Pershall; Iowa, United States
- Occupation: Children's author
- Writing career
- Years active: 1980–present
- Genre: Children's fiction
- Notable works: You Take the High Road; Two Weeks in Grade Six

Mary Katherine Pershall is an Australian children's author published by Penguin Books. She writes novels for the tween market, (children of late primary school age).

== Early life ==
Mary K. Pershall was born and grew up in Iowa, in the mid-west of the United States. She lived there until 1974, when aged 23, she emigrated to Melbourne, Australia as part of an airlift of teachers. From 1977 to 1987, she worked as an editor for children's magazines Comet, Pursuit and Challenge.

== Writing ==
Pershall is notable for her Two Weeks in Grade Six trilogy, which also includes the titles A Term in Year Seven and Escape from Year Eight. Her best known book is You Take the High Road, published in 1988, a novel for children set in contemporary Australia. It is listed in WorldCat as being held in 490 libraries. It has been translated into Dutch as Beelden van Nickie. Pershall is also responsible for the Ruby Clair series, which depicts a 12-year-old girl's struggle to juggle a normal life with the ghosts she can see, and has co-authored a number of novels with her daughters.

== Personal life ==
Pershall had her first daughter, Katherine Horneshaw, in 1985, married John Horneshaw in 1986, and went on to have a second daughter, Anna Horneshaw, in 1988.

Her younger daughter, who had a long history of mental illness, anorexia, and substance abuse, gained national media attention in November 2015 as the woman who stabbed her 67-year-old roommate, Zvonimir “Johnnie” Petrovski, to death over a pack of cigarettes. Anna Horneshaw, who was 28 weeks pregnant at the time of the Footscray attack, was sentenced in 2017 by Justice Jane Dixon to 17 years (13 years non-parole) for the crime. She is incarcerated in the Dame Phyllis Frost Women’s prison. The incident led Pershall to write her first non-fiction book, Gorgeous Girl, in 2018 where she "examines the complex mental and institutional issues that led to the ‘unimaginable horror’ of her child taking another’s life". Her older daughter has since gone on to a career in journalism.

== Books ==
- A Term in Year Seven (2005) [co-author Anna Pershall]
- A Long Way Home (1992)
- A Shield of Roses (1984)
- Asking for Trouble (2001)
- Aussie Bites:
  - Too Much to Ask For (1998)
- Aussie Chomps:
  - Making Jamie Normal (2005)
  - The Dog Stole my Brain (2011) [co-author Katherine Pershall]
- Behold the Dream (1988)
- Dawn of the White Rose (1985)
- Escape from Year Eight (2007) [co-author Anna Pershall]
- Forever the Dream (1989)
- Gold Coast (1990)
- Gorgeous Girl (2018)
- Hello Barney! (1988)
- Oz Rock (1987)
- Roses of Glory (1987)
- Ruby Clair:
  - The Trouble with Ghosts (2008)
  - Ghost with a Message (2009)
  - A Ghost at School (2010)
- Shopkeepers (1980)
- Stormy (1993)
- Two Weeks in Grade Six (2003) [co-author Anna Pershall]
- You Take the High Road (1988)
