= Louisa (biography) =

1987 biography by Australian writer Brian Matthews

- Author: Brian Matthews
- Language: English
- Genre: Biography
- Publisher: University of Queensland Press
- Publication date: 1987
- Publication place: Australia
- Media type: Print
- Pages: 421 pp.
- ISBN: 0869140388
- Preceded by: Romantics and Mavericks: The Australian Short Story
- Followed by: Quickening and Other Stories

Louisa (1987) is a biography of Louisa Lawson by Australian writer Brian Matthews. It was originally published by University of Queensland Press in Australia in 1987.

== Critical reception ==
Writing in The Canberra Times critic Peter Pierce noted: "The gaps in the biographical record of our writers are gradually being filled. Recently we have had Lawson's Archibald, Munro's Stephensen, Kinnane's Johnston. In progress are biographies of Gilmore, Furphy, Boyd and Stead. But following the audacious experiment of Louisa and its brilliant success (even as, and because Matthews admits not to have resolved all the problems of an alternative text), the game will never be the same again." And he concluded "...readers of Louisa are compelled to recognise 'a great Australian woman whose face has been in shadow too long'. Those readers will encounter a book that will radically affect literary scholarship in Australia. At the same time it is not only an outstanding biography, but one of the finest stories yet told here."

== Publication history ==
After its original publication in 1987 in Australia by publisher University of Queensland Press the biography was later republished as follows:

- McPhee Gribble, Australia, 1987 and 1988
- University of Queensland Press, Australia, 1998

== Awards ==
- ALS Gold Medal, 1988, winner
- New South Wales Premier's Literary Awards — Douglas Stewart Prize, 1988, winner
- Victorian Premier's Literary Awards — Nettie Palmer Prize for Nonfiction, 1988, winner

== See also ==
- 1987 in Australian literature
