= Forty-Seventeen =

1988 short story collection by Frank Moorhouse

- Author: Frank Moorhouse
- Language: English
- Genre: Short story collection
- Publisher: Viking
- Publication date: 1988
- Publication place: Australia
- Media type: Print
- Pages: 175 pp
- ISBN: 0670821365
- Preceded by: Conference-ville
- Followed by: Grand Days

Forty-Seventeen is a collection of short stories by the Australian writer Frank Moorhouse, published by Viking, in 1988.

The collection consists of 19 short stories from a variety of sources.

== Contents ==
- "Buenaventura Durruti's Funeral"
- "The Great-Grandmother Replica"
- "From a Bush Log Book 1 (Going into the Heartlands with the Wrong Person at Christmas)"
- "From a Bush Log Book 2 (Disobedience)"
- "The Grandfather's Curse"
- "Drink"
- "White Knight"
- "Libido and Life Lessons"
- "Delegate"
- "Disposal"
- "A Portrait of a Whore"
- "Martini"
- "A Portrait of a Virgin Girl (Circa 1955)"
- "The Story Not Shown"
- "Beirut"
- "Ex-Wife Re-Wed"
- "Rambling Boy"
- "Caves"
- "The Third Post Card"

== Critical reception ==
Writing in The Canberra Times reviewer Mark Thomas noted: "Forty-Seventeen has been generously treated, and slivers of the book do genuinely deserve applause. Moorhouse's aptitude for rendering dialogue is as keen as ever, especially with conversations in which grog is involved as subject or succour. His rambling digressions are again wry and artful; in Forty-Seventeen, Moorhouse regales us with observations on camping, conferences, sluttishness, and the Spanish Civil War, as well as the hardy perennial of drinking...But the book really lacks much discipline or development. Or, as Moorhouse remarks of a more carnal passion, 'it is a love without definition but not without art'. Lack of definition connotes lack of clarity and lack of force."

Richard Eder in The Los Angeles Times wrote: "Middle age is a hilltop from which the shapes of life past and life to come turn dismayingly visible. We name this dismay the mid-life crisis; a detonation like a star-shell that bathes the hilltop vantage in dead-white light. Forty-Seventeen by the Australian novelist Frank Moorhouse is about one man's view from his shell-lit hill. It is a landscape of wreckage and hope, of breakdown and renewal, of lives and loves disintegrating and re-forming."

== Publication history ==
After the collection's initial publication by Viking in 1988 it was republished as follows:

- Faber, UK, 1988
- Penguin, Australia, 1988
- Harcourt Brace Jovanovich, USA, 1989
- Picador, Australia, 1994
- Vintage Books, Australia, 2007

The collection was also translated into Spanish and Swedish in 1990, French in 1992, and German in 2000.

== Awards ==
- The Age Book of the Year Awards, Best Book, winner 1988
- The Age Book of the Year Awards, Best Fiction, winner 1988
- ALS Gold Medal, winner 1989

== See also ==
- 1988 in Australian literature
