= Elisabeth Wynhausen =

Australian journalist

Elisabeth Wynhausen (23 June 1946 – 5 September 2013) was a Dutch-born Australian journalist and author. During her career, she worked as a senior journalist with The Australian and in her earlier years for The Bulletin, The National Times and The Age. In her articles and books she was "passionate about social justice and telling 'people' stories".

== Life and career ==
Elisabeth Wynhausen was born in Maastricht in the Netherlands on 23 June 1946. Her parents were Paul Wynhausen and Marianne Nathans, "Dutch Jews who had escaped the Nazis". She migrated to Australia with her parents and her younger brother Jules in 1951.

She grew up in Manly in Sydney's northern beaches area. After a brief spell teaching at Frensham School, she joined The Daily Telegraph as a cadet in 1970 and later worked as a staff writer for The Bulletin magazine.

In 1970, she left for New York where she would work for twelve years as a foreign correspondent for The National Times and The Age newspapers and also submit articles to The Australian Women's Weekly.

Returning to Australia "to be close to her ageing parents", she worked firstly for The Sun-Herald and then moved across to The Australian newspaper where she would work for many years as a senior journalist.

In her final years, she "remade herself as a tweeter and blogger", using the pen name "Betty of Bondi".

== Assessment ==
Speaking of Wynhausen, the Australian journalist and writer, David Marr, who was one of her former colleagues at The National Times, said "she was harsh and unsentimental, and deeply compassionate, all at the same time" and added "she was deeply, deeply concerned about social justice but she came at it without any cant". Kim Williams, former chief executive of News Corp Australia, said: "She was the most truthful person I've ever known... She was awesomely direct, passionate...".

In 2005, the Australian journalist Ellen Fanning criticised an article by Wynhausen on poverty in "none-too-complimentary terms", accusing her of not acknowledging that article's inspiration by the American journalist Barbara Ehrenreich's book Nickel and Dimed. Fanning also claimed that Wynhausen's book, Dirt Cheap: Life at the Wrong End of the Job Market, on the same subject erred by suggesting that the American problems pertained in Australia when "it's not really Australia's dilemma".

== Personal life ==
Wynhausen died of pancreatic cancer on 5 September 2013 at the age of 67. Both of her parents and her brother having already died, she was survived by her niece Gabi and her nephew Jesse and their partners and children.

She was for a number of years married to the Australian academic, writer and literary critic Don Anderson.

== Award shortlists ==
Two of her books were shortlisted for Australian literary awards: Dirt Cheap: Life at the Wrong End of the Job Market in 2006 for the Douglas Stewart Prize for Non Fiction in the New South Wales Premier's Literary Awards and Manly Girls for the Victorian Premier's Literary Awards.

== Bibliography ==
=== Books ===
- Dirt Cheap: Life at the Wrong End of the Job Market, Sydney and Auckland: Macmillan, 1985.
- Manly Girls, Ringwood, Victoria: Penguin Books, 1989.
- On Resilience, Melbourne University Press, 2010 (Little Books on Big Themes); Sydney: Hachette Australia, 2021.
- The Short Goodbye: Skewed History of the Last Boom and the Next Bust, Melbourne University Press, 2011.

=== Articles ===
- "Children of the Cross", The National Times, 28 March – 2 April 1977.
- "Standoff in Buckeye and Bayou County", The National Times, 8 February 1981.
- "Reagan: peeling away the layers of illusion", The National Times, 29 November — 5 December 1981.
- "The strange casebook of Dr Sacks", The Age, 4 April 1987.
- "I'm not wild about Harry, but Harry's wild about me", The Sun Herald, 10 May 1992.
- "The brothers", The Weekend Australian: Review Section, 6–7 January 1996.
- "Watching the world go round", The Weekend Australian: Review Section, 6–7 January 1996.
- "Block Out", The Australian Magazine, 14–15 June 1997.
- "The end of the road", The Australian Magazine, 20–21 June 1998.
- "The Miller's Tale", The Australian, 15 February 2000.
- "Bright lights, dim city", The Weekend Australian: Review section, 26–27 February 2000.
- "Welcome to the Hell Hotel", The Australian, 30 March 2001.
- "From school lunches to lockups", The Australian, 10 May 2001.
- "Tricked, trafficked and terrified", The Weekend Australian, 16 August 2003.
- "Road to nowhere", The Australian Magazine, 20 May 2006.
- "In the face of hostility", The Australian, 22 November 2006.
- "Give it everything you've got", The Australian, 20 September 2008.
- "Inside the cleaning industry's dirty little secrets", The Australian, 4 October 2008.
