= Bone Scan =

1988 poetry collection by Gwen Harwood

- Author: Gwen Harwood
- Language: English
- Genre: Poetry collection
- Publisher: Angus and Robertson
- Publication date: 1988
- Publication place: Australia
- Media type: Print
- Pages: 56 pp
- Awards: 1989 Victorian Premier's Prize for Poetry
- ISBN: 0207160449

Bone Scan is a collection of poems by Australian poet Gwen Harwood, published by Angus and Robertson, in 1988.

The collection contains 39 poems by the author, all previously published in various Australian literary magazines or poetry anthologies.

It was the winner of the 1989 Victorian Premier's Prize for Poetry.

== Contents ==
- Class of 1927 sequence
  - "Slate"
  - "The Spelling Prize"
  - "Religious Instruction"
  - "The Twins"
- "Bone Scan"
- "The Night Watch"
- "Morning Again"
- "Blackbird"
- "I.M. Philip Larkin"
- Divertimento : To Jan Sedivka sequence
  - "Notturno"
  - "Picture a Brisbane Afternoon (Affetuoso)"
  - "Scherzo"
  - "Postlude: Listening to Bach"
- "Visitor"
- "Driving Home (to the Memory of Vera Cottew)"
- "The Sun Descending"
- "Crow-Call"
- "Sheba"
- "A Feline Requiem"
- "Schrodinger's Cat Preaches to the Mice"
- "Litany (to the Memory of Graeme Buchanan)"
- "Night and Dreams"
- "Cups"
- "Long after Heine"
- "The Magic Land of Music"
- "1945"
- "Forty Years On : To Peter Bennie"
- "Sunset, Oyster Cove (To the Memory of Edwin Tanner)"
- "Resurrection"
- "Mid-Channel"
- Pastorals : To Desmond Cooper sequence
  - "Threshold"
  - "A Welcome: Flowers and Fowls"
  - "Mt Mangana in the Distance"
  - "Arcady"
  - "Reflections"
  - "Autumn Rain"
  - "Winter Afternoon"
  - "Sea Eagle"
  - "Carapace"

== Critical reception ==
Critic Peter Pierce chose this collection as one of his best of 1989 noting that it "confirms the intelligence and impeccable ear of one of our finest and most durable poets."

== Awards ==
- 1989 Victorian Premier's Prize for Poetry, winner
- 1989 NSW Premier's Prize for Poetry, shortlisted
- 1990 Adelaide Festival Awards for Literature, John Bray Poetry Award, winner

== See also ==
- 1988 in Australian literature
