= Three Uneasy Pieces =

Book by Patrick White

- First edition
- Author: Patrick White
- Language: English
- Genre: Short story collection
- Publisher: Pascoe Publishing
- Publication date: 1987
- Publication place: Australia
- Media type: Print (Hardcover)
- Pages: 59 pages
- Preceded by: The Cockatoos

Three Uneasy Pieces is a collection of three short stories by Australian writer Patrick White, first published by Pascoe Publishing in 1987. It is the final work of fiction he published in his life.

== Contents ==
1. The Screaming Potato
2. Dancing with Both Feet on the Ground
3. The Age of a Wart
