= Helen Hodgman =

Australian novelist (1945–2022)

- Born: 27 April 1945; Aberdeen, Scotland
- Died: 6 June 2022 (aged 77); Sydney, New South Wales, Australia
- Occupation: Novelist
- Writing career
- Notable awards: 1989 Christina Stead Fiction Prize, winner

Helen Hodgman (27 April 1945 – 6 June 2022) was an Australian novelist, who was born in Aberdeen, Scotland and migrated to Australia with her family in 1958.

She won the 1978 Somerset Maugham Award for her novel Jack and Jill. She also won the 1989 Christina Stead Fiction Prize for the novel Broken Words.

== Career ==
On publication of her first novel, British critic Auberon Waugh, referred to her as "a born writer with a style and an elan which is all her own".

In 1983 Hodgman was diagnosed with Parkinson's disease, which, by 2001 had deprived her of the ability to write. She died in 2022 aged 77 in Sydney.

== Works ==
=== Novels ===
- Blue Skies, London: Duckworth, 1976 ISBN 0715611771; translated into German: Gleichbleibend schön (2012) ISBN 978-3-8135-0472-9
- Jack and Jill, London: Duckworth, 1978 ISBN 0715613049; translated into German: Jack & Jill (2015) ISBN 978-3-641-12422-9
- Broken Words, Ringwood, Victoria: Penguin, 1988 ISBN 0140102345; US edition: Ducks, Harmony, 1989 ISBN 978-0517573976
- Waiting for Matindi, St Leonards, NSW: Allen & Unwin, 1998 ISBN 1864488093
- Passing Remarks, Sydney: Anchor Books, 1996 ISBN 0868246778
- The Bad Policeman, Crows Nest, NSW: Allen & Unwin, 2001 ISBN 1865084352

=== Screenplay ===
- The Right Hand Man, for the 1987 film directed by Di Drew and starring Rupert Everett, Hugo Weaving and Arthur Dignam, based on the 1977 novel of the same name by K. M. Peyton.
