= The Lake at the End of the World =

1988 novel by Caroline Macdonald

- Author: Caroline MacDonald
- Genre: Post-apocalyptic fiction
- Published: 1988
- Media type: Print
- Awards: Victorian Premier's Award, 1989. Australian Children's Book of the Year Award, 1989.

The Lake at the End of the World is a post-nuclear holocaust young adult novel published in 1988. Its author is Caroline MacDonald. Set in 2025, it tells the story of Hector, a teenage boy who has lived all his life in an underground bunker as the youngest member of a cult, who occasionally escapes the bunker to look outside, and Diana, a teenage girl who lives with her parents, apparently the only survivors of the nuclear holocaust. The story is told in part from Hector's perspective and from Diana's.

== Reception ==
Won the Victorian Premier's Award, 1989. Was an Honour Book for the Australian Children's Book of the Year Award (Older Readers), 1989. Shortlisted for the NSW Premier's Award, 1989.

It is suggested in the book that the lake that all the characters live by has kept them safe, as they have respected it.

It has been compared to the Swiss Family Robinson in its depiction of the survival elements after the disaster. The Reading Teacher praised it as "tackling weighty matters" and also "telling a story that is riveting in its realism".

One of its themes is exploring the choice between living safely but in a restricted society and living dangerously and freely.
