= Frank Moorhouse =

Australian writer (1938–2022)

Frank Moorhouse AM
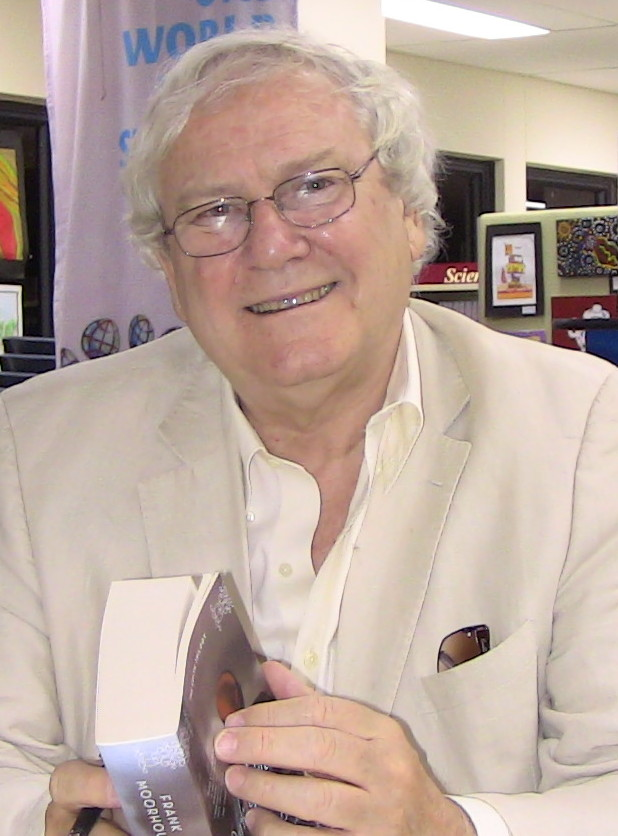
- Moorhouse in 2011
- Born: Frank Thomas Moorhouse; 21 December 1938; Nowra, New South Wales, Australia
- Died: 26 June 2022 (aged 83); Sydney, New South Wales, Australia
- Occupations: Journalist, writer, novelist, screenwriter
- Spouse: Wendy Halloway (m. 1959; sep. 1963)
- Writing career
- Years active: 1956–2022
- Period: 1956–2022
- Notable work: Dark Palace (2000)
- Movement: Balmain writer of the Sydney Push

Frank Thomas Moorhouse AM (21 December 1938 – 26 June 2022) was an Australian writer who won major national prizes for the short story, the novel, the essay and for script writing. His work has been published in the United Kingdom, France and the United States, and translated into German, Spanish, Chinese, Japanese, Serbian and Swedish.

Moorhouse is best known for having won the 2001 Miles Franklin Literary Award for his novel Dark Palace which, together with Grand Days and Cold Light, forms the "Edith Trilogy"—a fictional account of the League of Nations—which traces the strange, convoluted life of a young woman who enters the world of diplomacy in the 1920s and becomes involved in the newly formed International Atomic Energy Agency after World War II.

== Early life ==
Moorhouse was born in Nowra, New South Wales, the youngest of three boys, to a New Zealand-born father, Frank Osborne Moorhouse, OAM, and mother, Purthanry Thanes Mary Moorhouse (nee Cutts), OAM. His mother was a direct descendant of John Boden Yeates (1807-1861), a British convict transported to Australia in 1837. His father was an inventor of agricultural machinery who, with his wife, established a factory in Nowra to make machinery for the dairy industry. Both his parents were active leaders in the community.

Moorhouse was a constant reader from an early age and often spoke of his desire to be a writer after reading Alice in Wonderland while bedridden for months from a serious accident at the age of twelve. The book was given to him by his sister-in-law, Muriel Moorhouse (nee Lewis,) on her first-ever visit to Nowra to meet the Moorhouse family. "After experiencing the magic of this book, I wanted to be the magician who made the magic."

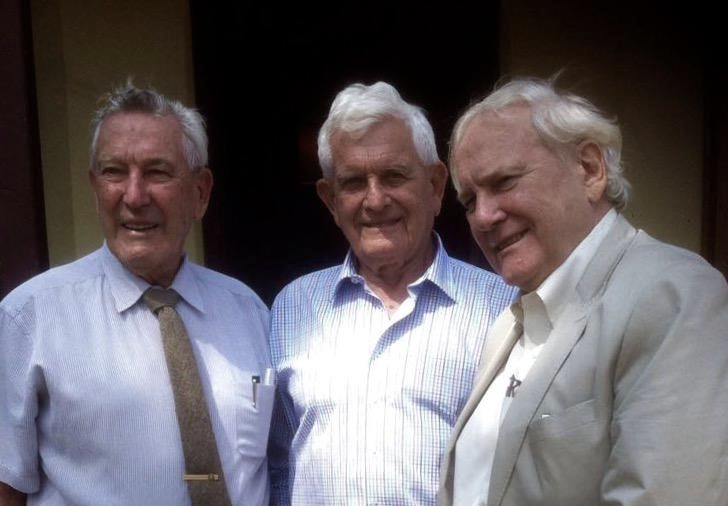
Brothers Arthur, Owen and Frank Moorhouse AM at the ceremony conferring Frank's degree of Doctor of Letters (honoris causa). Sydney University, 13 May 2015

Moorhouse's infant and primary schooling was at Nowra and his secondary schooling at Wollongong Secondary Junior Technical (WSJT) High School to the Intermediate Certificate, and Nowra High School to Leaving Certificate. His military service included army school cadets for two years at WSJT including signals specialist course and cadet officer course. He completed his compulsory national military service of three months' basic training and three years part-time in the Reserve Army (infantry) in the University of Sydney Regiment and in the Riverina Regiment, Wagga Wagga (1957–1960). He studied units of undergraduate political science, Australian history, English, and journalism—law, history and practice—at the University of Queensland as an external student while working as a cadet newspaper journalist in Sydney and as a journalist in Wagga Wagga, without completing a degree.

== Writing career ==
After leaving school, Moorhouse began his career as a copy boy and then trained as a cadet journalist on the Daily Telegraph (1955–1957). He then worked as a reporter and editor on country newspapers during the years 1958–1962; the Wagga Wagga Advertiser as a reporter, the Riverina Express as reporter, and the Lockhart Review as editor. He returned to Sydney to become an administrator and tutor in media studies for the Workers' Educational Association (WEA) and later became editor of the WEA magazine The Highway (1963–1965). He worked as a trade union organiser for the Australian Journalists' Association and as part-time editor of The Australian Worker newspaper of the AWU—a union representing shearers, drovers, and other rural workers—the oldest trade union newspaper in Australia (1964). In 1966, he was briefly editor of the country newspaper The Boorowa News.

At eighteen, he published his first short story, The Young Girl and the American Sailor, in Southerly magazine and this was followed by publication of early stories in Meanjin, Overland, Quadrant, Westerly, and other Australian literary magazines.

The author of 18 books, Moorhouse became a full-time fiction writer during the 1970s, also writing essays, short stories, journalism and film, radio, and TV scripts. During his early career he developed a narrative structure which he has described as the 'discontinuous narrative'. He lived for many years in Balmain where, together with Clive James, Germaine Greer, and Robert Hughes, he associated with the Sydney Push—an anarchistic movement that championed freedom of speech and sexual liberation. In 1975 he played a fundamental role in the evolution of copyright law in Australia in the case University of New South Wales v Moorhouse.

Moorhouse also wrote and lectured on the way communication and the control of communication has been developing and the relationship of creative professionals to the economy and to the political system. He was active in the defence of freedom of expression and in analysis of the issues affecting it and in the 1970s was arrested and prosecuted on a couple of occasions while campaigning against censorship. He was in turns the chairman, a director, and one of the founding group of the Australia Copyright Agency (CAL), which was set up by publishers and authors to coordinate the use of copyright and which now distributes millions of dollars annually to Australian writers. He was a past president of the Australian Society of Authors and a member of the Australian Press Council. He was also an organiser for the Australian Journalists' Association.

Frank Moorhouse. Lunching in Sydney with family. (6 January 2019)

Moorhouse was appointed a member of the Sydney PEN eminent writers panel in 2005.

He participated in Australian and overseas conferences in arts, communication and related areas and served as a guest lecturer and writer-in-residence at sundry Australian and overseas universities.

== Personal life and death ==
Moorhouse married his high-school girlfriend Wendy Halloway in 1959, but they separated four years later, having no children. Thereafter he led a sometimes turbulent bisexual life shaped by his own androgyny, some of which is chronicled in his book Martini: A Memoir (Random House 2005). Moorhouse lived alone in Potts Point, Sydney. Early in his career he committed himself to a philosophy of personal candour, stating that there was no question a person could ask of him to which he would not try to give an honest answer. In his public commentary he questioned the notion of separation of public and private life and the concept of privacy.

Throughout his life he frequently voyaged alone on eight-day, map-and-compass, off-trail treks into wilderness areas. Right up until his death he still had his backpack ready, saying he would like to go on one last hike. He was also a gourmet with a special passion for oysters. He once said that he was a member of a think-tank called Wining and Dining.

During the researching and writing of his League of Nations novels—the 'Edith Trilogy' (1989–2011)—he lived in Besançon, France (close to Geneva), Washington D.C., Cambridge, and Canberra.

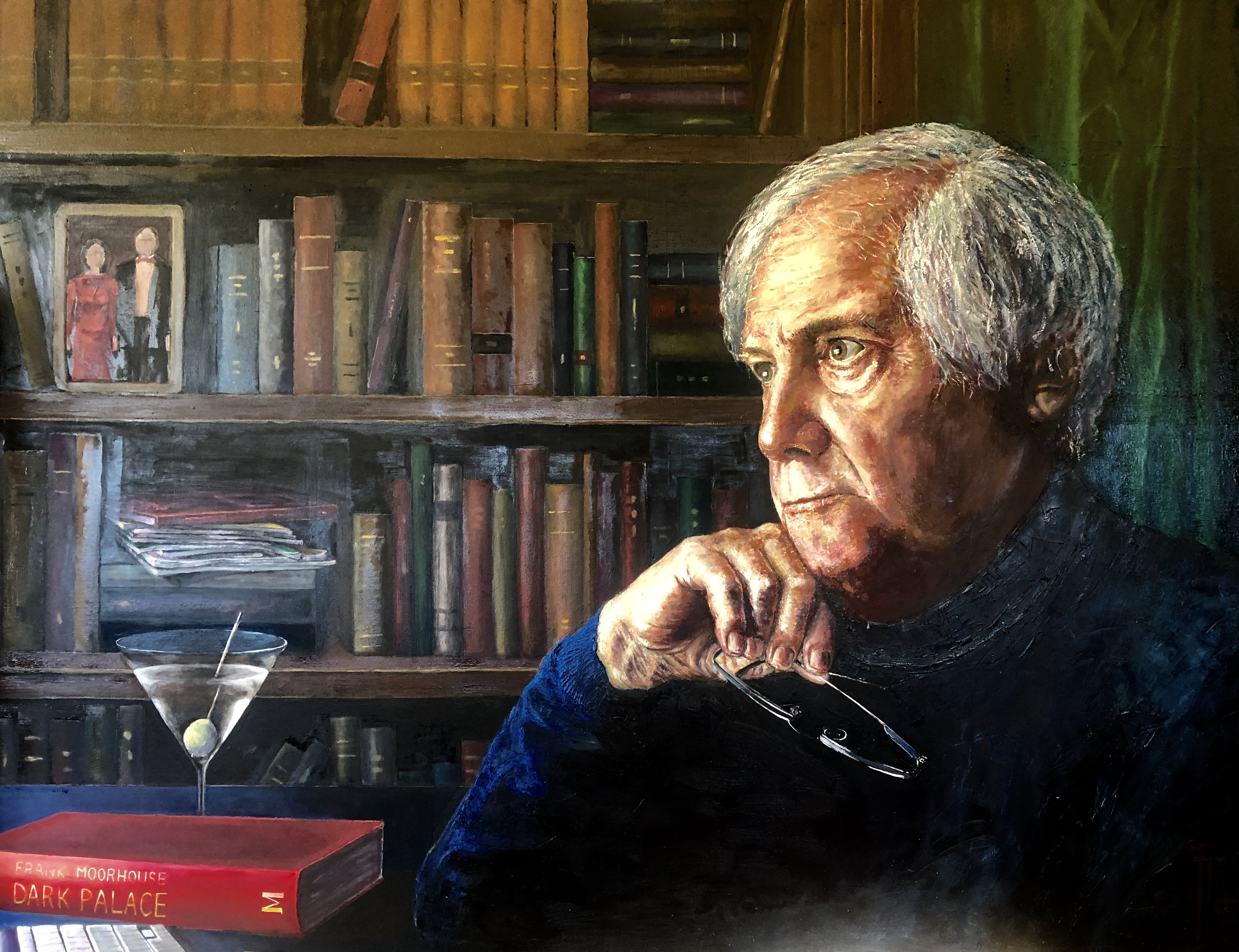
Uncle Frank's Dark Palace by Prof. Wei Cheng (2019). Painted to celebrate his 80th birthday. Oil on canvas. 2m x 1.5m

To mark his 80th birthday, Prof. Wei Cheng (husband of his niece, Karin Moorhouse) painted his portrait. The oil painting, a tribute to his Edith Trilogy, now hangs in the Royal Automobile Club of Australia. It is one of just three known portraits of Frank, the other two painted by the late Adam Cullen.

Moorhouse died at a hospital in Sydney on 26 June 2022 at the age of 83. At that time he was survived by his two older brothers, Owen (1928-2026) and Arthur (b.1932.)

== Awards and honours ==
In 1985, Moorhouse was appointed a Member of the Order of Australia for service to Australian literature; and in 2001 he received the Centenary Medal for service to Australian society through writing. Moorhouse was conferred with a Doctor of Letters honoris causa by Griffith University.

In 2009, Moorhouse was awarded the Senior Fellowship of the Zukunftskolleg at the University of Konstanz.

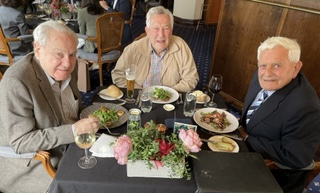
Last known photograph of Frank Moorhouse, together with his brothers Arthur (centre) and Owen (right.) Taken to celebrate his 83rd birthday and Owen's 93rd. Royal Automobile Club of Australia, Sydney. 8 December 2021.

Moorhouse was conferred a Doctor of Letters honoris causa by the University of Sydney, and Doctor of the University by Griffith University.

=== Literary awards ===
- 1975 National Book Award for Fiction winner: The Electrical Experience
- 1988 The Age Book of the Year Award winner: Forty-Seventeen
- 1988 ALS Gold Medal: Forty-Seventeen
- 1994 Adelaide Festival Award for Fiction winner: Grand Days
- 2001 Miles Franklin Award winner: Dark Palace
- 2012 Queensland Literary Award for Fiction winner: Cold Light
- 2012 Miles Franklin Award shortlist: Cold Light

The writer in a time of terror appeared in Griffith Review and won the 2007 Alfred Deakin Prize for an Essay Advancing Public Debate in the Victorian Premier's Literary Award and the award for Social Equity Journalism in The Walkley Awards for Excellence in Journalism.

The Coca-Cola Kid, a romantic comedy film based on Moorhouse's short stories in The Americans, Baby and The Electrical Experience, for which Moorhouse also wrote the screenplay, was entered into the 1985 Cannes Film Festival; although it did not receive an award.

== Selected bibliography ==
=== Linked short stories (Discontinuous narratives) ===
- —— (1969). Futility and Other Animals. Sydney: Gareth Powell Associates.
- —— (1972). The Americans, Baby: A Discontinuous Narrative of Stories and Fragments. Sydney: Angus & Robertson. ISBN 9780207124914.
- —— (1973). The Illegal Relatives. Sydney: Self-Published.
- —— (1974). The Electrical Experience: A Discontinuous Narrative. Random House Australia. ISBN 9781740511421.
- —— (1977). Tales of Mystery and Romance. Sydney: Angus & Robertson. ISBN 9780207957000.
- —— (1980). The Everlasting Secret Family. North Ryde: Angus & Robertson. ISBN 9780207171796.
- —— (1990). Lateshows. Sydney: Pan Macmillan. ISBN 0330272160.

=== Novels and novellas ===
- —— (1976). Conference-ville. Sydney: Angus & Robertson. ISBN 9780207134210.
- —— (1988). Forty-Seventeen. Ringwood, Victoria: Viking. ISBN 9780670821365.
- —— (1993). Grand Days. Sydney: Pan Macmillan. ISBN 9780732907686.
- —— (2000). Dark Palace. Sydney: Random House. ISBN 9780091836764.
- —— (2011). Cold Light. Sydney: Random House. ISBN 9781741661262.

=== Humour and memoir ===
- —— (1985). Room Service: Comic Writings of Frank Moorhouse. Ringwood, Victoria: Viking. ISBN 9780670808588.
- —— (1995). Loose Living. Sydney: Picador. ISBN 9780330357197.
- —— (2002). The Inspector-General of Misconception: The Ultimate Compendium to Sorting Things Out. Milsons Point, New South Wales: Vintage. ISBN 9780091841621.
- —— (2005). Martini: A Memoir. Milsons Point, New South Wales: Random House Australia. ISBN 9781740513128.

=== Non-fiction ===
- —— (2014). Australia Under Surveillance. North Sydney: Random House Australia. ISBN 9780857985989.

=== Anthologies ===
- Moorhouse, Frank, ed. (1973). Coast to Coast: Australian Stories 1973. Sydney: Angus & Robertson. ISBN 9780207126932.
- ——, ed. (1980). Days of Wine and Rage. Ringwood, Victoria: Penguin Books. ISBN 9780140056877.
- ——, ed. (1988). Fictions 88. Crows Nest, New South Wales: ABC Enterprises for the Australian Broadcasting Corporation. ISBN 9780642531070.
- ——, ed. (1983). The State of the Art: The Mood of Contemporary Australia in Short Stories. Ringwood, Victoria: Penguin. ISBN 9780140065985.
- ——, ed. (2004). The Best Australian Stories 2004. Melbourne, Victoria: Black Inc. ISBN 9781863952453.
- ——, ed. (2005). The Best Australian Stories 2005. Melbourne, Victoria: Black Inc. ISBN 9781863951104.
- ——, ed. (2017). The Drover's Wife: A Collection. Penguin Random House. ISBN 9780143784821.

== Scripts for films ==
=== Feature films ===
- The American Poet's Visit (1969)
- The Girl from the Family of Man (1970)
- The Machine Gun (1971)
- Between Wars (1974)
- The Girl Who Met Simone de Beauvoir in Paris (1980)
- The Coca-Cola Kid (1985)
- The Everlasting Secret Family (1988)

=== TV films ===
- Conferenceville (1976)
- Time's Raging (1985)

=== Docudrama ===
- The Disappearance of Azaria Chamberlain (1983)

== Reviews and critiques ==
=== Martini: A Memoir ===
Martini: A Memoir was published in 2005. Part autobiography, part history of the martini, the book's minimal plot involves deep conversations about the cocktail between the author and his martini-obsessed friend, V.I. Voltz, a character based on Moorhouse's friend, screenwriter Steven Katz.

The book includes love letters written by Moorhouse's ex-wife, the journalist Wendy James, to him during her time as a student in Nowra. She was deeply unhappy at their unauthorised publication and at the suggestion that she had had an affair with one of her teachers. James requested that any monies earned from the book's publication be donated to charity, suggesting that charities which aid children affected by AIDS would be suitable recipients. Moorhouse offered to return 20–30 letters to James but refused to apologise for the passages of the book dealing with the affair with the teacher saying, "Nowhere in the book is it seriously suggested that the ex-wife – not that it's purely Wendy – ever had an affair with her teacher. This idea exists only in the mind of the character – of the demented narrator-author."
