= Brian Matthews (writer) =

Australian author (1936–2022)

- Born: 27 December 1936; St Kilda, Victoria, Australia
- Died: 2 June 2022 (aged 85); Strathalbyn, South Australia, Australia
- Occupation: Writer
- Writing career
- Language: English

Brian Matthews (1936–2022) was an Australian literary scholar, biographer and short story writer. He is considered Australia's foremost scholar of Henry Lawson and Lawson's mother Louisa.

== Life and career ==
Matthews was born in St Kilda, Victoria on 27 December 1936. He was educated at De La Salle College and Melbourne University. He took a BA with a major in English and later an MA on Henry Lawson under the direction of Vincent Buckley. After teaching in various schools in the 1950s and 1960s, he moved to Adelaide in 1967 to work at Bedford Park Teachers' College, but soon joined the new English Department at Flinders University. He taught English and Australian literature (and in later years, solely the latter) until the early 1990s at Flinders. He was a frequent visitor to Italy, where he taught Australian literature, and spent 1974 at Exeter University. In 1986 he held a Fulbright Fellowship and taught at the University of Oregon.

Matthews took a leading role in the establishment of the Association for the Study of Australian Literature (ASAL). He published his critical study of Henry Lawson, The Receding Wave, in 1972 and later wrote the entry for Lawson in the Australian Dictionary of Biography.

In the 1970s, although he had a secure position at Flinders University, he undertook a PhD on George Orwell. After its completion, he focused entirely on Australian literature and culture. His chief preoccupation throughout the 1980s was a work that began as a biography of Henry Lawson's mother, Louisa. When Louisa appeared in 1987, it proved to be a much more radical form of biography than had originally been envisaged. It went on to win the Australian Literature Society Gold Medal, and the Victorian Premier's Literary Award for non-fiction.

In 1989, Matthews was granted an Australia Council for the Arts Writer's Fellowship. He chaired the Literature Board of the Australia Council from 1990 to 1992. In 1993, he took up the headship of the Menzies Centre for Australian Studies at the University of London, remaining there for four years. On his return to Australia, he became foundation director of the Europe-Australia Institute at Victoria University.

He was by then engaged on a commissioned biography, of the historian Manning Clark. This work eventually appeared with Allen & Unwin in 2008. In the meantime he published The Temple Down the Road, an eccentric history of the Melbourne Cricket Ground, in 2003, and a memoir A Fine and Private Place in 2000. In retirement he continued writing, contributing a monthly column for Eureka Street . His last book, Benaud: An Appreciation about Richie Benaud, appeared with Text in 2017.

Matthews died on 2 June 2022 at Strathalbyn, South Australia.

== Bibliography ==
=== Novel ===
- Magpie with Peter Goldsworthy (1992)

=== Short story collections ===
- Quickening and Other Stories (1989)

=== Autobiography ===
- A Fine and Private Place (2000)

=== Biography ===
- Louisa (1987)
- Manning Clark: A Life (2008)
- Benaud: An Appreciation (2017)

=== Essays ===
- Romantics and Mavericks: The Australian Short Story (1987)
- Oval Dreams: Larrikin Essays on Sport and Low Culture (1991)

=== Edited ===
- Henry Lawson: Selected Stories (1971)
- Readers, Writers, Publishers: Essays and Poems (2004)

== Awards and nominations ==
- 1988 winner ALS Gold Medal – Louisa
- 1988 winner New South Wales Premier's Literary Awards – Douglas Stewart Prize for Non-Fiction – Louisa
- 1988 winner Victorian Premier's Literary Awards – The Nettie Palmer Prize for Non-Fiction – Louisa
- 1989 joint winner Queensland Premier's Literary Awards – Arts Queensland Steele Rudd Australian Short Story Award – Quickening and Other Stories
- 2001 winner Queensland Premier's Literary Awards – Best Non-Fiction Book – A Fine and Private Place
- 2010 winner National Biography Award – Manning Clark: A Life
