= Victorian Premier's Prize for Fiction =

The Victorian Premier's Prize for Fiction, formerly known as the Vance Palmer Prize for Fiction, is a prize category in the annual Victorian Premier's Literary Award. As of 2011 it has an remuneration of A$25,000. The winner of this category prize vies with 4 other category winners for overall Victorian Prize for Literature valued at an additional A$100,000.

The prize was formerly known as the Vance Palmer Prize for Fiction from inception until 2010, when the awards were re-established under the stewardship of the Wheeler Centre and restarted with new prize amounts and a new name. The Palmer Prize was valued at A$30,000 in 2010. The award was named after Vance Palmer, a leading literary critic. Palmer wrote reviews and presented a program called Current Books Worth Reading on ABC Radio. He also wrote books about Australian cultural life, including National Portraits (1940) A.G. Stephens: His Life and Work, (1941) Frank Wilmot (1942), Old Australian bush ballads (co-authored with Margaret Sutherland) (1951) and The Legend of the Nineties (1954). He was appointed in Chairman of the Advisory Board of the Commonwealth Literary Fund in 1947. The Palmer Prize was managed by the State Library of Victoria from 1997 to 2010.

== Winners and shortlists ==
Winners of the Overall Victorian Prize for Literature have a blue ribbon.

Victorian Premier's Prize for Fiction, winners and finalists
Year	Author	Title	Result	Ref.
2011	Kim Scott	That Deadman Dance	Winner	
2011	Gail Jones	Five Bells	Finalist	
2011	Roger McDonald	When Colts Ran	Finalist	
2011	Craig Sherborne	The Amateur Science of Love	Finalist	
2011	Dominic Smith	Bright and Distant Shores	Finalist	
2011	Rohan Wilson	The Roving Party	Finalist	
2012	Gillian Mears	Foal's Bread	Winner	
2012	Anna Funder	All That I Am	Finalist	
2012	Wayne Macauley	The Cook	Finalist	
2012	Frank Moorhouse	Cold Light	Finalist	
2012	Gerald Murnane	A History of Books	Finalist	
2012	Carrie Tiffany	Mateship with Birds	Finalist	
2014 (Note: Prior to 2014, the award year was directly related to the year of publication. In 2014, the award year referred to books published in the previous year. That is, in 2012, the award went to books published in 2012. In 2014, the award went to books published in 2013.)	Alex Miller	Coal Creek	Winner	
2014	Michelle de Kretser	Questions of Travel	Finalist	
2014	Richard Flanagan	The Narrow Road to the Deep North	Finalist	
2014	Hannah Kent	Burial Rites	Finalist	
2014	Tim Winton	Eyrie	Finalist	
2014	Alexis Wright	The Swan Book	Finalist	
2015	Rohan Wilson	To Name Those Lost	Winner	
2015	Ceridwen Dovey	Only the Animals	Finalist	
2015	Sonya Hartnett	Golden Boys	Finalist	
2015	Mark Henshaw	The Snow Kimono	Finalist	
2015	Wayne Macauley	Demons	Finalist	
2015	John A. Scott	N	Finalist	
2016	Mireille Juchau	The World Without Us	Winner	
2016	Miles Allinson	Fever of Animals	Finalist	
2016	Stephanie Bishop	The Other Side of the World	Finalist	
2016	James Bradley	Clade	Finalist	
2016	Steven Carroll	Forever Young	Finalist	
2016	Charlotte Wood	The Natural Way of Things	Finalist	
2017	Georgia Blain	Between a Wolf and a Dog	Winner	
2017	Micheline Lee	The Healing Party	Finalist	
2017	Sean Rabin	Wood Green	Finalist	
2017	Philip Salom	Waiting	Finalist	
2017	Jock Serong	The Rules of Backyard Cricket	Finalist	
2017	Laura Elizabeth Woollett	The Love of a Bad Man	Finalist	
2018	Melanie Cheng	Australia Day	Winner	
2018	Steven Carroll	A New England Affair	Finalist	
2018	Michelle de Kretser	The Life to Come	Finalist	
2018	Sofie Laguna	The Choke	Finalist	
2018	Michael Sala	The Restorer	Finalist	
2018	Kim Scott	Taboo	Finalist	
2019	Elise Valmorbida	The Madonna of the Mountains	Winner	
2019	Robbie Arnott	Flames	Finalist	
2019	Jay Carmichael	Ironbark	Finalist	
2019	Morenno Giovannoni	The Fireflies of Autumn: And Other Tales of San Ginese	Finalist	
2019	Gail Jones	The Death of Noah Glass	Finalist	
2019	Melissa Lucashenko	Too Much Lip	Finalist	
2020	Christos Tsiolkas	Damascus	Winner	
2020	Yumna Kassab	The House of Youssef	Finalist	
2020	Anna Krien	Act of Grace	Finalist	
2020	Wayne Macauley	Simpson Returns	Finalist	
2020	Tara June Winch	The Yield	Finalist	
2021	Laura Jean McKay	The Animals in That Country	Winner	
2021	Richard Flanagan	The Living Sea of Waking Dreams	Finalist	
2021	Gail Jones	Our Shadows	Finalist	
2021	Vivian Pham	The Coconut Children	Finalist	
2022	Melissa Manning	Smokehouse	Winner	
2022	Larissa Behrendt	After Story	Finalist	
2022	Jennifer Down	Bodies of Light	Finalist	
2022	Briohny Doyle	Echolalia	Finalist	
2022	John Hughes	The Dogs	Finalist	
2022	S. J. Norman	Permafrost	Finalist	
2023	Jessica Au	Cold Enough for Snow	Winner	
2023	Brendan Colley	The Signal Line	Finalist	
2023	Sophie Cunningham	This Devastating Fever	Finalist	
2023	Paul Dalla Rosa	An Exciting and Vivid Inner Life	Finalist	
2023	Yumna Kassab	The Lovers	Finalist	
2024	Melissa Lucashenko	Edenglassie	Winner	
2024	Hossein Asgari	Only Sound Remains	Finalist	
2024	Eugen Bacon	Serengotti	Finalist	
2024	Jen Craig	Wall	Finalist	
2024	Charlotte Wood	Stone Yard Devotional	Finalist	
2024	Jessica Zhan Mei Yu	But the Girl	Finalist	
2025	Fiona McFarlane	Highway 13	Winner	
2025	Melanie Cheng	The Burrow	Finalist	
2025	Evie Wyld	The Echoes	Finalist	
2025	David Owen Kelly	Host City	Finalist	
2025	Michelle de Kretser	Theory & Practice	Finalist	
2025	Ella Baxter	Woo Woo	Finalist	
2026	Omar Musa	Fierceland	Winner	
2026	Merrkiyawuy Ganambarr-Stubb, Leonie Norrington, Djawa Burarrwanga & Djawundil Maymuru	A Piece of Red Cloth	Finalist	
2026	Moreno Giovannoni	The Immigrants	Finalist	
2026	Lee Lai	Cannon	Finalist	
2026	Rachel Morton	The Sun was Electric Light	Finalist	
2026	Azar Shokoofeh	The Gowkaran Tree in the Middle of Our Kitchen	Finalist	

== Vance Palmer Prize for Fiction (1985–2010) - Winners and shortlists ==
=== 1985–1989 ===
Year	Author	Title	Result	Ref.
1985	David Malouf	Antipodes	Winner	
1986	Peter Carey	Illywhacker	Winner	
1986	Kate Grenville	Lilian's Story	Finalist	
1986	Christina Stead	Ocean of Story	Finalist	
1986	Janette Turner Hospital	Borderline	Finalist	
1986	Tim Winton	That Eye, the Sky	Finalist	
1987	Janine Burke	Second Sight	Winner	
1987	Kate Grenville	Dreamhouse	Finalist	
1987	Rod Jones	Julia Paradise	Finalist	
1988	Murray Bail	Holden's Performance	Winner	
1988	Peter Carey	Oscar and Lucinda	Finalist	
1988	David Ireland	Bloodfather	Finalist	
1989	Rodney Hall	Captivity Captive	Winner	
1989	Marion Campbell	Not Being Miriam	Finalist	
1989	Nigel Krauth	The Bathing Machine Called the Twentieth Century	Finalist	

=== 1990–1999 ===
Year	Author	Title	Result	Ref.
1990	Tom Flood	Oceana Fine	Winner	
1990	Thea Astley	Reaching Tin River	Finalist	
1990	Susan Johnson	Flying Lessons	Finalist	
1991	Finola Moorhead	Still Murder	Winner	
1991	Nigel Krauth	JF Was Here	Finalist	
1991	Sam Watson	The Kadaitcha Sung	Finalist	
1992	Brian Castro	Double-Wolf	Winner	
1992	Peter Carey	The Tax Inspector	Finalist	
1992	Jan McKemmish	Only Lawyers Dancing	Finalist	
1993	Brian Castro	After China	Winner	
1993	Liam Davison	Soundings	Finalist	
1993	Marion Halligan	Lovers' Knots	Finalist	
1994	John A. Scott	What I Have Written	Winner	
1994	Elizabeth Jolley	The Georges' Wife	Finalist	
1994	Tom Shapcott	Mona's Gift	Finalist	
1995	Kate Grenville	Dark Places	Winner	
1995	Brian Castro	Drift	Finalist	
1995	Tim Winton	The Riders	Finalist	
1996	Amanda Lohrey	Camille's Bread	Winner	
1996	Shane Maloney	The Brush-Off	Finalist	
1996	Sue Woolfe	Leaning Towards Infinity	Finalist	
1997	Robert Drewe	The Drowner	Winner	
1997	Robert Dessaix	Night Letters	Finalist	
1997	John Scott	Before I Wake	Finalist	
1998	Richard Flanagan	The Sound of One Hand Clapping	Winner	
1998	Elizabeth Jolley	Lovesong	Finalist	
1999	Roger McDonald	Mr. Darwin's Shooter	Winner	
1999	Murray Bail	Eucalyptus	Finalist	
1999	Tom Gilling	The Sooterkin	Finalist	

=== 2000–2010 ===
Year	Author	Title	Result	Ref.
2000	Christopher Koch	Out of Ireland	Winner	
2000	Michael Meehan	The Salt of Broken Tears	Finalist	
2000	Brenda Walker	Poe's Cat	Finalist	
2001	Peter Carey	True History of the Kelly Gang	Winner	
2001	Rodney Hall	The Day We Had Hitler Home	Finalist	
2001	Frank Moorhouse	Dark Palace	Finalist	
2002	Richard Flanagan	Gould's Book of Fish: A Novel in Twelve Fish	Winner	
2002	Chloe Hooper	A Child's Book of True Crime	Finalist	
2002	John Scott	The Architect	Finalist	
2003	Brian Castro	Shanghai Dancing	Winner	
2003	Michelle de Kretser	The Hamilton Case	Finalist	
2003	Sonya Hartnett	Of a Boy	Finalist	
2004	Annamarie Jagose	Slow Water	Winner	
2004	J. M. Coetzee	Elizabeth Costello	Finalist	
2004	Malcolm Knox	A Private Man	Finalist	
2005	Sonya Hartnett	Surrender	Winner	
2005	Gail Jones	Sixty Lights	Finalist	
2005	Ian Townsend	Affection	Finalist	
2006	Peter Carey	Theft: A Love Story	Winner	
2006	J. M. Coetzee	Slow Man	Finalist	
2006	Kate Grenville	The Secret River	Finalist	
2006	Carrie Tiffany	Everyman’s Rules for Scientific Living	Finalist	
2007	Alexis Wright	Carpentaria	Winner	
2007	Steven Carroll	The Time We Have Taken	Finalist	
2007	Rhyll McMaster	Feather Man	Finalist	
2008	Helen Garner	The Spare Room	Winner	
2008	J. M. Coetzee	Diary of a Bad Year	Finalist	
2008	Michelle de Kretser	The Lost Dog	Finalist	
2009	Christos Tsiolkas	The Slap	Winner	
2009	Murray Bail	The Pages	Finalist	
2009	Eva Hornung	Dog Boy	Finalist	
2009	Nam Le	The Boat	Finalist	
2009	Tim Winton	Breath	Finalist	
2010	Peter Temple	Truth	Winner	
2010	Peter Carey	Parrot and Olivier in America	Finalist	
2010	Brian Castro	The Bath Fugues	Finalist	
2010	J. M. Coetzee	Summertime	Finalist	
2010	Craig Silvey	Jasper Jones	Finalist	
