= Victorian Premier's Unpublished Manuscript Award =

Australian literary award

The Victorian Premier's Unpublished Manuscript Award is a literary award for an unpublished manuscript. It can be entered by any author from the Australian State of Victoria that has not published a project based on fiction.

The Award was established by the State Library of Australia in 2003. In 2011 administration of the Victorian Premier's Literary Awards changed to the Wheeler Centre. As of 2017 is valued at A$15,000.

== Winners and shortlists ==
Victorian Premier's Unpublished Manuscript Award winners and shortlists
Year	Author	Title	Result
2003	Carrie Tiffany	Everyman's Rules for Scientific Living	Winner
2004	Angela Savage	Thai Died	Winner
2005	Peter Barry	I Hate Martin Amis et al.	Winner
2006	Andrew Hutchinson	Rohypnol	Winner
2007	Nick Gadd	The Ghost Writer	Winner
2008	Mandy Maroney	Going Finish	Winner
2008	Daniel Ducrou	Conditions of Return	Shortlist
2008	Robert Power	In Search of the Blue Tiger	Shortlist
2009	Amy Espeseth	Sufficient Grace	Winner
2009	Catherine Harris	Like Being a Wife	Shortlist
2009	Lisa Jacobson	The Sunlit Zone	Shortlist
2010	Peggy Frew	House of Sticks	Winner
2010	Andrew Nette	Cambodia Darkness and Light	Shortlist
2010	Michelle Aung Thin	Winsome of Rangoon (published as The Monsoon Bride)	Shortlist
2012 (Note: No award was presented in 2011 due to change in timing.)	Graeme Simsion	The Rosie Project	Winner
2012	Rose Mulready	The Day We Lost The Moon	Shortlist
2012	Stephen Samuel	Strange Eventful History	Shortlist
2012	Clive Wansbrough	The Twoway Boy	Honorable mention
2013	Maxine Beneba Clarke	Foreign Soil	Winner
2013	Naomi Bailey	A Field Guide to Birdwatching in Bad Weather	Shortlist
2013	Emily Bitto	The Strays	Shortlist
2013	Kirsten Alexander	Dreams	Commended
2013	Beverly Almeida	Hijrotic	Commended
2013	Matt Davies	Fire and Icecream	Commended
2013	Leah De Forest	The Borrowed River	Commended
2013	Vince Leigh	Baroque Days	Commended
2013	Stuart McCullough	Goodsir	Commended
2014	Miles Allinson	Fever of Animals	Winner
2014	Jennifer Down	Our Magic Hour	Shortlist
2014	JM Green	Good Money	Shortlist
2014	Jane Abbott	Watershed	Commended
2014	Caitlin Crowley	Headland	Commended
2014	Zoe Morrison	Some Thoughts on Music and Freedom (published as Music and Freedom)	Commended
2014	Victoria Osborne	Man of Clay	Commended
2014	Genevieve Poetka	Winter Traffic	Commended
2014	Yannick Thoraval	The Current	Commended
2015	Jane Harper	The Dry	Winner
2015	Jim McIntyre	Nikolai the Perfect	Shortlist
2015	Michelle Wright	Fine	Shortlist
2015	Lucinda Berg	The Kafka Papers: The Revised Memoirs of Max Brod	Commended
2015	Alice Bishop	A Constant Hum	Commended
2015	Chris Mooney-Singh	Foreign Madam and the White Yogi	Commended
2015	Kerry Munnery	Unhomely Places	Commended
2015	Imbi Neeme	The Hidden Drawer	Commended
2016	Melanie Cheng	Australia Day	Winner
2016	Jay Carmichael	Ironbark	Shortlist
2016	Susan Johnston	Wildgirl	Shortlist
2016	Jacquie Byron	Trouble Sleeping	Commended
2016	Chris Quigley	Failed Manhood	Commended
2016	Mark Brandi	To Skin a Rabbit (published as Wimmera)	Commended
2017	Christian White	Decay Theory	Winner
2017	Kaz Kilmore-Barrymore	Truth Untold	Shortlist
2017	Laura Stortenbeker	Low Light	Shortlist
2017	Terry Donnelly	Hey Luna and Other Stories	Commended
2017	R. W. R. McDonald	The Nancys	Commended
2019	Victoria Hannan	Kokomo	Winner
2019	John Byron	Wedding Cake Island	Shortlist
2019	Wayne Marshall	Frontier Sport	Shortlist
2020	Rhett Davis	Hovering	Winner
2020	Allee Richards	In Real Life	Shortlist
2020	Emily Spurr	A Million Things	Shortlist
2021	André Dao	Anam	Winner
2021	Neela Janakiramanan	On A Knife's Edge	Shortlist
2021	Jessica Zhan Mei Yu	But the Girl	Shortlist
2021	J.R. Burgmann	Children of Tomorrow	Commended
2021	Patrick Hunn	Goblins	Commended
2021	Kylie Mirmohamadi	The Guest House	Commended
2022	Keshe Chow	Fauna of Mirrors	Winner
2022	Abbey Lay	Lead Us Not	Finalist
2022	Nina Wan	The Albatross	Finalist
2022	C. J. Garrow	Orangutan Ballet	Commended
2022	Elliot J. Han	The Echoes of George Street	Commended
2022	Soja Pitt	Strange Intersections	Commended
2023	Mick Cummins	One Divine Night	Winner
2023	Amy Brown	Stillwater	Shortlist
2023	Ruby Todd	Bright Objects	Shortlist
2024	Rachel Morton	Panajachel	Winner
2024	Hayley Elliott-Ryan	Garbage	Shortlist
2024	N. J. Madden	Laughing River	Shortlist
2025	Chris Ames	I Made This Just for You	Winner
2025	Lauren Williams	Every Stolen Moment	Shortlist
2025	Kat Capel	Heavy Petting	Shortlist
2026	Charlotte Guest	The Kookaburra	Winner
2026	Anatolij Lisov	Incognito	Shortlist
2026	WIlliam Paine	The Final Voyage of Charles Le Corre	Shortlist
