= What I Have Written (novel) =

1993 novel by Australian author John A. Scott

- Author: John A. Scott
- Language: English
- Genre: Literary novel
- Publisher: McPhee Gribble
- Publication date: 1993
- Publication place: Australia
- Media type: Print
- Pages: 229 pp.
- Awards: 1994 Victorian Premier's Prize for Fiction, winner
- ISBN: 0869143042

What I Have Written is a 1994 novel by the Australian author John A. Scott.

It was the winner of the 1994 Victorian Premier's Prize for Fiction.

== Synopsis ==
In the first section of the book Australian writer Avery is holidaying with his wife Gillian in Paris and is attracted to Catherine, a woman he meets there. Back in Australia he begins an amorous correspondence with her.

In the second section Australian writer Christopher has a near-fatal stroke, after which his wife Sorel receives a manuscript, supposedly written by her husband, which details his view of their disintegrating marriage, an affair he had while they were on holiday in Paris, and his contempt for her. What follows are her attempts to unravel the mystery this manuscript presents.

== Critical reception ==
A reviewer for Kirkus Reviews had some difficulties with the novel: "Scott manipulates his characters with the skill of a grandmaster, but fails to imbue them with any distinguishing traits aside from their sexual appetites. Even the eroticism grows tedious."

== Publishing history ==
After the novel's initial publication by McPhee Gribble in 1993, it was reprinted as follows:

- W. W. Norton, USA, 1994
- Penguin, Australia, 1996
- Untapped, Australia, 2021 and 2022

The novel was also translated into Dutch in 1995, and German in 1997.

== Awards ==
- 1994 Victorian Premier's Prize for Fiction, winner

== Adaptations ==
The novel was adapted as a film with the same title in 1995, directed by Australian director John Hughes from a screenplay by John A. Scott.

== Notes ==
- The author was interviewed by Fiona Capp about the novel in The Age.

== See also ==
- 1993 in Australian literature
