= Before I Wake (Scott novel) =

1996 novel by John Scott

- Author: John Scott
- Language: English
- Genre: novel
- Publisher: Penguin, Australia
- Publication date: 1996
- Publication place: Australia
- Media type: Print (Paperback)
- Pages: 433
- ISBN: 0140256954
- Preceded by: What I Have Written
- Followed by: The Architect

Before I Wake (1996) is a novel by Australian author John Scott.

The novel consists of a sequence of five novellas and features poems by Melissa Curran, attributed in the story to the character Danielle. The main character is Jonathan Ford, a failed writer who travels through Thirroul, Paris, Littlehampton, and Tasmania, reflecting on his difficult childhood before reuniting with his sisters. He seduces and abandons a poet named Danielle, who commits suicide. He also forms a relationship with a woman named Donna and her sister Rachel; the three end the novel in tentative happiness at a vineyard in Tasmania, which Rachel inherits after another character, Tardieu, is the victim of parochial violence.

The core theme of the novel is the impact of abuse, especially child abuse, and the experience of personal damage and failure. In addition to the characters' many experiences of abuse and violence, the novel discusses the murder of James Bulger, which occurred three years prior to the novel's publication.

In 1997, the novel was shortlisted for both the Miles Franklin Literary Award and the Vance Palmer Prize for Fiction.
