= The Death of Noah Glass =

2018 novel by Gail Jones

- First edition
- Author: Gail Jones
- Language: English
- Genre: Novel
- Publisher: Text, Australia
- Publication date: 2018
- Publication place: Australia
- Media type: Print (Paperback)
- ISBN: 9781925603408
- Preceded by: A Guide to Berlin

The Death of Noah Glass is a novel by Australian author Gail Jones released by Text Publishing in 2018.

== Premise ==
The Death of Noah Glass concerns three main characters: the eponymous Noah Glass and his children Evie and Martin. Noah has been found dead face down in the communal swimming pool at his apartment complex. Evie and Martin reconnect as a result, and are caught off guard when local police come with questions about their father's alleged involvement in an international art heist.

== Reviews ==
- Sydney Review of Books
- The Saturday Paper

== Awards and nominations ==
Year	Award	Category	Result	Ref.
2019	ALS Gold Medal	—	Shortlisted	
2019	Miles Franklin Award	—	Shortlisted	
2019	Prime Minister's Literary Awards	Fiction	Won	
2019	Victorian Premier's Literary Awards	Victorian Premier's Prize for Fiction	Shortlisted	
2019	Voss Literary Prize	—	Shortlisted	
2020	Adelaide Festival Awards for Literature	Fiction	Won	
