= Shift (play) =

1975 Australian LGBTQ+ play

SHIFT was a two-act play written in 1975 by Australian playwright Diana King, also known as DQ. It was directed by Alison Richards, a notable figure in feminist theatre at the time, and performed in Melbourne and later Sydney. It is recognised as the first lesbian play written in Australia.

The play follows three waitresses who share a terrace house in Fitzroy, Melbourne and centres on a woman coming to terms with her lesbianism, exploring themes of sexual expression, identity, and lifestyle. There are two climaxes in the play: one when Gabby is forced by her friend to face the fact she is attracted to her, and the second, when Gabby confronts her flatmate's mother, Victoria, with her sexuality.

== Characters ==
- Gabby – Trish Crick
- Katey – Jane Mullet
- Haidi – Nina Bondarenko
- Victoria – Finola Moorhead

== Production history ==
SHIFT premiered in Melbourne in October 1975, as part of the Women Times Three season, and was produced by the Women’s Theatre Group. The season was hosted at the Pram Factory in Carlton, a well-known venue for experimental and political theatre in Australia.

After its initial run in Melbourne, SHIFT later toured to Sydney in June 1979, where it was performed at Sydney Trades Hall. The Sydney production, presented by Outskirt, a women's theatre company, attracted a near-capacity audience on opening night. The promotional poster for the Sydney tour was designed by Chris Sharp at the Tin Sheds at the University of Sydney, which was a hub for radical art and design during that era.

== Legacy ==
The play was part of a growing movement in the 1970s to explore diverse sexual identities and break down traditional barriers in Australian theatre. As a pioneering piece of lesbian-themed theatre, SHIFT holds a unique place in Australian cultural history. Its production by the Women’s Theatre Group and its reception in Melbourne and Sydney underscore its importance in the development of feminist and lesbian representation on stage in Australia.
