= Dreams of Speaking =

2006 novel by Gail Jones

- Author: Gail Jones
- Cover artist: Naresh Singh/Millennium Images, UK
- Language: English
- Genre: Novel
- Publisher: Random House Australia
- Publication date: 2006
- Publication place: Australia
- Media type: Print (Paperback)
- Pages: 226 (first edition)
- ISBN: 1-74166-522-1
- OCLC: 65526988
- Dewey Decimal: 823 22
- LC Class: PR9619.3.J6863 D74 2006b
- Preceded by: Sixty Lights
- Followed by: Sorry

Dreams of Speaking is a 2006 novel by Australian author Gail Jones. Similar to Jones’ first two novels, Sixty Lights and Five Bells, Dreams of Speaking also explores the concept of modernity and its effect on understanding ourselves. The novel moves through time and space, following a reflective writing style. Following a few months in the life of a young Australian writer, Alice Black, the novel weaves through time to explore Alice's journey as a young Australian academic conducting research on the concept of modernity. The novel begins in Perth, Western Australia, and follows Alice's travels to Paris and Tokyo. As she chases the true meaning of modernity, Alice unintentionally learns more about her world and herself. Jones’ includes disparate elements in her novel including letters between the characters and facts. Overall, the novel received mixed reviews from eminent critics.

== Plot ==
Protagonist, Alice Black, is a young Australian academic. The novel follows several months in the life of Alice, as she conducts research for a project that she titled The Poetics of Modernity. Intending to further her research into the unremarked beauty of modern things, Alice leaves Perth for Paris. Alice leaves behind her sister, Norah, who, unbeknown to her, is suffering from cancer.

When in Paris, Black coincidentally meets her estranged lover, Stephen. Stephen, too, had travelled to Paris to conduct, presumably, philosophical research. Stephen attempts to rekindle their relationship. But, Alice almost immediately grows distant from Stephen, instead concentrating on her research. In her mind, Alice resolves that she is not there to be with him but rather to study the concept of modernity. Through her project, Alice aims to consider the complex relationship between the human mind and "these plastic and metal extrusions," ultimately questioning how the aesthetics of technology meld with the human psyche.

Yet, upon moving to Paris, Alice becomes almost obsessively consumed by her own loneliness. She feels a sense of isolation and disorientation as she mourns her ever-growing physical and emotional distance from her working-class family and her failed relationship with Stephen. By chance, Alice meets Mr Sakamoto, an elderly Japanese gentleman, on a train. Mr Sakamoto and Alice commence a friendship, despite initial tentativeness. To her surprise, Alice discovers Mr Sakamoto spoke impeccable, literary English and was also fascinated by modern technology, working on a biography of Alexander Bell, the inventor of the telephone. Yet, Mr Sakamoto also embodied a darker side to modernity, being a survivor of the Nagasaki bomb. The pair forge an intense friendship, predicated on their shared curiosity for the modern world and their search for some way of explaining the elusive poetry which resides within a machine.

The serendipitous and surprising friendship is forged despite vast cultural and generational differences, forming the heart of the novel. Finding an intellectual partner, Alice follows Mr Sakamoto to Japan. Tragically and unexpectedly, Mr Sakamoto dies whilst in Japan. The death and Alice's grief spurs her to abandon her initial project for one of a different kind. Instead of exploring the operations of global modernity, Alice tells the story of her friendship with Mr Sakamoto. Ultimately, Alice realises that modernity is haunted by the persistence of the unmodern, typified in death, loss and mourning. The novel concludes where it began, with Alice returning to Australia to find her sister, Norah, suffering from cancer.

== Characters ==
- Alice Black: A young Australian academic. Alice is originally from Perth, however moves to Paris, and then Japan, in order to conduct research for her project on modernity and emerging technology.
- Norah Black: Alice's sister.
- Stephen: Alice's estranged lover, an Australian academic. Stephen also travels to Paris, unbeknown to Alice, pursuing his research.
- Mr. Sakamoto: An elderly Japanese man with a passion for researching the lives of famous inventors.

== Major themes ==
=== Modernity, time and the modern space ===
The novel explores the inherent contradiction in modern technology. Jones suggests that despite experiencing unprecedented levels of speed and connection and with devises used to connect across vast distances, humans are innately lonely. Alice's life is defined by communities which at their heart are disparate and scattered. She often contemplates how families and friends become disembodied from each other and, through technology, are merely voices or images on the screen. Yet amidst the increasingly distant modern world, there are moments of interconnectedness and intimacy which should be celebrated. For example, whilst Mr Sakamoto and Alice are seemingly dissimilar, coming from different countries and generations, these boundaries are crossed as they bond over their shared appreciation for the mass culture of Hollywood films.

Alice's upbringing in an isolated country town engenders her yearning to explore the sophisticated modern world. This is exemplified through the imagery of awe in “television is, after all, a box of wonders,” illustrating the profundity of modern technology to Alice. Early in the novel, when Alice travels via aircraft she has an epiphany as to the significance of modern technology. Upon entering the plane, Alice says “I feel like God,” suggesting a feeling of spiritual enlightenment which arises through the opportunities modernity presents. Literary critic, Lydia Wevers, argues that Jones’ novel is deep with postmodern ironies and the ironies of modernity. Wevers highlights that the wonder and romance of technology, in Jones’ text, is overshadowed by its "crepuscular gloom" and the "solipsistic reveries" of passenger experience. Notably, Dreams of Speaking considers the brutal contradictions of everyday life. New technologies that infiltrate modern society have dramatically altered the relationship between humans and the natural world. Interestingly, whilst the river in Perth is perhaps the nearest thing to natural landscape in the novel, it is also, ironically, a place of consumption. Jones’ comments that the river is filled with "yachts and windsurfers and ferries bearing tourists."

=== Friendship ===
Alice's natural curiosity for modernity provokes her to unveil the profundity of the evolving world as well as forging new friendships and hence gaining renewed perceptions. Her development and immersion in her “unfeminine interest in machines,” perpetuates her new friendship with Mr Sakamoto who offers enlightening new perspectives. The crosscutting format of the novel, juxtaposing past and present, intertwined with intellectual comments from Mr. Sakamoto about inventors, evokes the wonder of discovering and intellectual gains Alice makes through friendship. Jones reiterates the transformative ramifications that result from engaging with unexpected friendships, venturing into the unknown, despite metaphysical frames. Alice's pursuit of unveiling modernity allows her to make a life-changing friendship with Mr Sakamoto.

The novel encapsulates Alice's struggle with loneliness and sense of dislocation and disconnectedness. Whilst there is no definitive resolution to Alice's struggle, Jones does allude to her transformative journey of self-discovery -as Alice learns both the good and bad in life, heralded by her embracement of an unconventional friendship. Whilst Alice's initial project is aimed at exploring global modernity, through interaction and friendship, she abandons her initial ideas and instead creates a celebration of her friendship with Mr Sakamoto. Her self-discovery through initial disillusionment is largely brought about through her friendship with Mr Sakamoto. Mr Sakamoto wisely declares “the difficulty with celebrating modernity is that we live with so many persistently unmodern things. Dreams, love, babies, illness. Memory. Death,” emphasising the restraints of modernity which although profound lacks emotional relevance, a pivotal message which Alice learnt through her embracement of friendship. Furthermore, Alice's immersion in the new city of Tokyo as a result of pursuing new friendships suggests the intrinsic necessity for individuals to extended boundaries and discover new ideas and people. In Tokyo, Alice experience both grief and awe that ultimately enables her to grow as a person.

=== Transnationalism ===
Literary critic, Timothy Kazuo Steains, explores the theme of transnationalism in Dreams of Speaking. In essence, Steains argues that the transnational and national are co-dependent, and this dependency is depicted in the novel. Alice's return to Perth is a pivotal moment in the novel as it leads to the reimagining of nation but with a transnational perspective. Through her cross-cultural experiences, Alice rebuilds her relationship with home and views the once unhomely space as homely again. The sense of loss, nation and memory she feels upon arriving home, echoes the sentiment of the reconciliation with loss happening in Japan. Inherently, Alice mixes Japanese and Australian stories fluently, allowing the cultures, memories and interactions to clash temporarily and spatially. Ultimately, Jones advocates for transnationalism as a means of truly understanding oneself and home.

== Reception ==
From its inception, Dreams of Speaking has received a mixed reception amongst eminent literary critics.

A review in the British newspaper, The Independent, largely emulates the general consensus towards the novel. Notably, The Independent review comments on the novel's clever ability to grapple with the complex themes of memory and technology, and their abilities to alter our experiences of space and time. Furthermore, The Independent's review commends Jones' argument that modernity causes our perspective to shift. In the novel, this argument is exemplified clearly through Alice's realisation that whilst we live in a constant present tense, merely a photograph can send us hurtling back in time. The Independent reviewer Adil writes that Jones' refractive writing style, where the narrative is woven in fragments, further emphasises her notion of time and the impact of modernity upon our concept of it. Adil adds hat Jones’ refractive, fragmented writing style is commendable for its ability to mimic poetry, "shards of poetry stud Jones’ writing’ enabling her to cleanly and effectively switch between lyrical and academic register".

Joanna Briscoe, a key literary critic from Australian newspaper, The Guardian, writes critically of Jones' novel. Briscoe suggests that Jones' refractive writing style is difficult for the reader to grasp. She highlights that Dreams of Speaking lacks any cohesive narrative structure and is merely airy layers of imagery. According to Briscoe, Jones’ attempted poetic musings fail to enlighten the reader and do not serve to enhance the novel. Briscoe deems her poetic attempts as ‘over excited flights into purple.’ On a positive note, Briscoe argues that Mr. Sakamoto's sparse chunks of biography are illuminating. She also suggests that Sakamoto's tales of invention are beautiful and engaging to read. Briscoe claims that the Jones’ descriptions of Alice's childhood are also a high point in the book. When describing childhood stories, Jones is able to refrain from overwriting and instead presents a simplistic and enlightening tale that is far more engaging to the reader, according to The Guardian. Overall, Briscoe contends that the novel strives for an almost European sensibility, as it lacks a definite narrative structure, eschews many conventions and is suspended from a transparent theme. Yet, whilst Jones attempts to create a unique postmodern text, with a European sensibility, Briscoe maintains that Jones’ poetic experimentation requires much tightening to be as beautiful as it needs to be. Whilst her attempts to create an experimental, poetic text failed, in the eyes of Briscoe, in a starker, Australian mode, Jones excels.

Author James Bradley presents a predominantly positive review of Jones’ novel Dreams of Speaking in his review in The Age. Bradley comments on Jones’ formidable ability to explore the theme of loss, particularly in relation to modern technology and the impending loss that inherently prevails in technology. Bradley also commends Jones’ ability to bring out the theme of loss through Mr Sakamoto's stories. Mr Sakamoto's recitation of the story of Bell, and the role the haunting fact of his mother's deafness played in his later invention of the telephone was, according to Bradley's review, where the notion of loss was the strongest. Bradley also notes that the sections in Nagasaki, although initially seemingly all-too-obvious, are strongly delivered by Jones to create effective and powerful commentary on the perils of modernity. Whilst Bradley's review is primarily optimistic of Jones’ novel, he does contend with Briscoe on some points. Like Briscoe, Bradley too suggests that Jones’ writing style was, at times, clunky and difficult to read.

== Awards ==
Awards for Dreams of Speaking
| Year | Award | Result | Ref. |
|---|---|---|---|
| 2006 | Orange Prize for Fiction (UK) | Longlist | |
| 2006 | Western Australian Premier's Book Awards, Fiction | Shortlist | |
| 2007 | Miles Franklin Literary Award | Shortlist | |
| 2007 | New South Wales Premier's Literary Awards: Christina Stead Prize for Fiction | Shortlist | |
| 2007 | Nita Kibble Literary Award | Shortlist | |
| 2008 | International Dublin Literary Award | Shortlist | |

== Reviews ==
- The Independent
- The Guardian
- Bradley, James (February 4, 2006). "Dreams of Speaking". The Age.
- The Sydney Morning Herald
