= Australia Day (story collection) =

2017 short story collection by Australian author Melanie Cheng

- Author: Melanie Cheng
- Language: English
- Genre: Short story collection
- Publisher: Text Publishing
- Publication date: 3 July 2017
- Publication place: Australia
- Media type: Print
- Pages: 272 pp.
- Awards: 2018 Victorian Premier's Prize for Fiction, winner
- ISBN: 9781925498592

Australia Day is a 2017 short story collection by the Australian author Melanie Cheng.

It was the winner of the 2018 Victorian Premier's Prize for Fiction.

The original version of the text won the 2016 Victorian Premier's Unpublished Manuscript Award.

== Contents ==
This collection of 14 short stories features outsiders and misfits, some who are different because of their ethnic origins and some due to their character or beliefs.

1. "Australia Day" focalises the experience of Stanley Chu, an international student from Hong Kong, who travels with his fellow medical student, Jessica Cook, to meet her family for an Australia Day celebration in inner Melbourne. There, Stanley experiences tense and awkward interactions with Jessica's family and ex-boyfriend, who all embody the white Australian archetype: Anglo-Saxon and charming with a proclivity for banter. As such, the story explores the "gulf that is cultural, personal and sexual" between Stanley and the other, white and Australian characters in the story, and this gulf "acts as a synecdoche for identity on a national scale".
2. "Big Problems" explores the experience of Leila Ayers, a white-passing Englishwoman of Syrian background, who has been granted a short break from her au pair duties to travel to Alice Springs. In the tour group, she is joined by an Australian couple with their young children and a South African woman named Ellen, amongst others. Each of her tour group companions have various attitudes towards the ethical question of whether or not to climb Uluru.
3. "Macca" is set in a regional Australian town and follows Dr Emily Garrett as she struggles to remain emotionally and professionally detached from Macca, a poor and homeless male patient directed by court order to see a general practitioner for his alcoholism.
4. "Clear Blue Skies" follow the newlyweds Kat and Raf as they honeymoon in the Maldives. Raf is now a rich professional in the finance industry – a huge contrast to his past as a struggling Iraqi refugee. In comparison, Kat is a freelance writer. Their difference in income becomes a source of Kat's insecurity, and creates tension for the couple as they grapple with contrasting attitudes to spending on luxury experiences.
5. “Ticket-holder Number 5” follows Tania, a clerk at a Roads & Maritime Services office, who carries a can of capsicum spray in her bag in case of violent encounters with customers. Her usual impregnable facade begins to crack as one day at work, Tania encounters Alice Pickering, a sobbing woman who asks to transfer the registration for a vehicle under her now-dead husband's name.
6. "Hotel Cambodia" concerns Melissa, a woman of Anglo-Singaporean background, who volunteers as a nurse at an NGO-run clinic based in Cambodia. The story recounts Melissa's experiences settling into Cambodia, particularly her Sunday getaways to the eponymous Hotel Cambodia.
7. "Things That Grow" follows Cora, whose husband Paul died four weeks ago. Struggling to deal with grief, Cora finds herself neglecting basic duties, such as showering and maintaining a healthy diet. She has been in contact with a plumber to help her sort out the tree roots that have invaded the bathroom, which only started off as mushrooms when she and Paul first moved in.
8. "Fracture" comprises two parallel, interlinked narratives. The story opens with Tony Ferrari, a middle-aged Italian man who "sustained a tibial fracture after falling off a broken ladder" and becomes disgruntled after a negative experience with a doctor. Tony recruits the help of his family, particularly his grandson Luca, to find a way to express his resentment after bureaucratic avenues, such as submitting a formal complaint, prove ineffective. The second narrative focuses on Deepak, the Indian junior consultant doctor who tended Tony's injury. Deepak is in a covert relationship with his boss, Simone, who is 'one of the top orthopaedic surgeons in Australia', and whose whiteness, to Deepak, amplifies his own brownness.
9. "Toy Town" follows Maha, who recently immigrated from Beirut, Lebanon to Melbourne, Australia with her husband, Malik, and their four-year-old daughter, Amani. Maha reflects upon the difficulties of immigrating, particularly those of confronting racism. At the play centre that Maha takes her daughter to regularly, she encounters Nicole and her daughter Charlotte. The two women connect over the food they bring – falafel and Vegemite – as they watch their daughters befriend each other effortlessly.
10. "Doughnuts" recounts the experiences of Barry Wheeler, a social worker who has had a long working relationship with his first client, a psychologically impaired woman named Pandora, who frequently experiences mania and psychosis. Certain events lead Barry to visit his father, diagnosed with Alzheimer's, in his aged care facility. Barry brings doughnuts to the visit, which is something that also reminds him of his mother.
11. "Allomother" is the first of two stories in this collection written in the first-person narrative perspective. The narrator is the surrogate mother of Molly, who is the child of Jules and Mick, and has agreed upon an arrangement whereby she is allowed to take Molly out one day every week. On this day, she takes her out to the zoo, and Molly is particularly drawn to the elephants, which parallels the story's title as allomothering describes a widespread phenomenon among primates (especially elephants) where non-parents contribute to the care of an offspring.
12. "White Sparrow" follows Bec, who is now raising her son Oliver alone after her husband Tom left the family. Oliver has a large port wine stain on his face, and the skin anomaly was the source of Tom's discomfort, which later formed into an intense aversion that culminated in his departure. Bec worries over Oliver's experiences of alienation at school, but is delighted that he develops a somewhat close relationship with his teacher Mr Walton over stories of an incredibly rare albino sparrow, which has recently been sighted in the Melbourne suburbs.
13. "Muse" is the only other story besides "Allomother" in this collection that is written in the first-person narrative perspective. Evan is a widow who still grieves over the death of his wife Lola five years ago, to the extent that he revisits their old home to reminisce. Evan has a tense relationship with his daughter Bea. He connects more easily with her partner Edwina, an artist who encourages Evan to attend life drawing classes with her.
14. "A Good and Pleasant Thing" closes the short story collection, and features elements that mirror the first story, "Australia Day", such as its setting on the national Australian holiday, and its protagonist of an immigrant from Hong Kong now living in Melbourne. In this story, Mrs Chan, an aging widow in a family of professionals who struggles with experiences of loneliness within the unfamiliar landscape of Melbourne as well as emotional alienation from her Australian-born children and grandchildren. The main event in the short story is a family dinner at a restaurant in the CBD called Celestial Gardens, which resembles a bland caricature of Chineseness adjusted to Western bourgeois tastes. The critic Robert Wood, writing a review on the short story collection, observes that "food becomes a trope through which to regard identity as a whole."

== Critical reception ==
Reviewing the collection for Australian Book Review Johanna Leggatt noted that "Cheng has a remarkable sense for the portentous drama in everyday lives. She focuses on the way her characters respond to change or tragedy rather than on dramatic plot turns, and she does this with a deftness and an economy of language that is breathtaking."

Robert Wood, writing in Sydney Review of Books found a common theme and answer running through these stories: "This family reconciliation is Cheng’s answer to the problem presented in ‘Australia Day’. The question posed in that first story was: how is the immigrant to belong here? What are the structural conditions that allow contemporary Australia to be a place for all peoples in a way that recognises tradition and autonomy?"

== Awards ==
- 2016 Victorian Premier's Unpublished Manuscript Award, winner
- 2018 Victorian Premier's Prize for Fiction, winner

== See also ==
- 2017 in Australian literature

== Notes ==
- Dedication: To Mum, for feeding me books, and Dad, for setting the bar high
