= Sarah Matravers =

English model, presenter and actress

- Born: 16 December 1973 (age 52); New Forest, Hampshire, England
- Occupations: Actress; presenter; model

Sarah Matravers is an English model, presenter and actress. Born in the New Forest, Hampshire and raised in Kent, she lives in Fulham, London.

She first came to public attention when she won The Great British Beauty Competition on ITV's This Morning television show. She also appeared in the 1990s revival of Take Your Pick with Des O'Connor. Sarah's part was to hold the gong during the yes/no part of the quiz. Her appearance on This Morning led to a successful modelling career with Pantene, Nike, Oil of Ulay, Speedo, Johnnie Walker, Avon, Sensodyne, Berlei and Durex, before switching, initially to low key media work in the form of voice-overs for the likes of Oil of Olay and narrating for British Sky Broadcasting, presenting corporate videos and regional television. She moved on to presenting and acting in national television and is best known for presenting BBC's DIY show Big Strong Boys, playing the roles of Joly Salter in ITV's Footballers' Wives and Footballers' Wives: Extra Time, Victoria Baptiste (wife of Didier Baptiste) in Sky's Dream Team and Jackie Randall in Mile High.

From November 2007 until October 2008, Matravers had a recurring role in BBC daytime soap Doctors as the psychotic girlfriend of Dr. Nick West and has appeared in the British film Saxon.

== Personal life ==
Her two-year relationship with fellow Footballers Wives – Extra Time actor Marc Bannerman ended publicly in 2007, when Bannerman appeared on ITV reality show I'm a Celebrity... Get Me Out of Here! and professed his love for fellow contestant Cerys Matthews.

Matravers became engaged to New Zealand television producer Ian Stewart in March 2008, marrying him the following month.
