= Nance Donkin =

Australian children's writer and journalist (1915–2008)

Nance Donkin AM
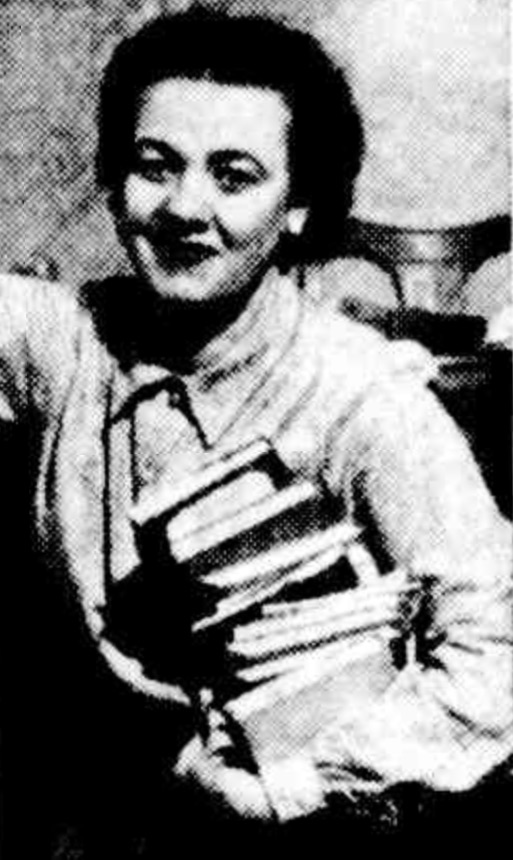
- Donkin in 1953
- Born: Nance Clare Pender; 7 March 1915; Maitland, New South Wales, Australia
- Died: 18 April 2008 (aged 93); Canterbury, Victoria, Australia
- Writing career
- Pen name: Alison Clare

Nance Clare Donkin AM (7 March 1915 – 18 April 2008) was an Australian children's writer and journalist.

== Early life and education ==
Nance Clare Pender was born in Maitland on 7 March 1915, youngest daughter of Archibald Thomas and Clara Rose Pender. She had two sisters and three brothers. She was educated at Maitland High School and was appointed secretary of the Old Girls' Union's Younger Set in 1934.

== Career ==
Donkin had her first short story published at the age of eight and began writing on social happenings for the Maitland Daily Mercury at 16. From there she moved to the Newcastle Morning Herald where she was social and fashion editor and also reviewed films.

Donkin married Victor E. Donkin at West Maitland on 14 January 1939 and moved to England where she worked as a freelance writer, including radio scripts. The following year her husband's company transferred him back to Australia and she began writing as Alison Clare.

Nancy Shepherdson, writing in Twentieth-century Children's Writers, considered Donkin's first books to have "uninspired plots and much digressive conversation".

Donkin served as president of the Children's Book Council of Australia (Victoria) from 1968 to 1976.

In 1984 she wrote Stranger and Friend, a nonfiction book about Greek migrants to Australia. She had first visited Greece 18 years earlier and returned several times. The book aimed to improve the relationship between Greeks and Australians by describing the Greek tradition of hospitality and friendship.

Donkin wrote two collections of biographies of Australian women, The Women Were There: Nineteen Women Who Enlivened Australia's History and Always a Lady: Courageous Women of Colonial Australia.

== Awards and recognition ==
Donkin was appointed a Member of the Order of Australia in the 1986 Australia Day Honours for "service to the community, particularly in the fields of children's literature and adult education". She received the Alice Award from the NSW branch of the Society of Women Writers in 1990.

== Death ==
Donkin died at Faversham House in Canterbury, Victoria on 18 April 2008. She was survived by her daughter and son and their families. Her death notice in the Herald Sun concluded, "A storyteller, a teller of tales and weaver of dreams".

== Nancy Donkin Literary Award ==
The Nancy Donkin Literary Award was inaugurated by Donkin's family and the Society of Women Writers Victoria and has been presented biennially since 2009.

Winners:

- 2009 Ruth Starke
- 2011 Isobel Carmody
- 2013 Cassandra Golds
- 2015 Roseanne Hawke
- 2017 Anna Walker
- 2019 Dianne Wolfer
- 2021 Anna Ciddor
- 2023 Pamela Rushby

== Selected works ==
=== Fiction ===
- Araluen Adventures, (Edith B. Bowden, illustrator), 1946
- House by the Water, 1969
- A Currency Lass, (Jane Walker, illustrator), 1969
- Johnny Neptune, 1971
- Margaret Catchpole (Edwina Bell, illustrator), 1974
- A Friend for Petros, 1974
- Yellowgum Girl, 1976
- Green Christmas, 1976
- The Best of the Bunch, (Edwina Bell, illustrator), 1978
- Nini, 1979
- Two at Sullivan Bay, (Margaret Senior, illustrator), 1985

=== Nonfiction ===
- Stranger and Friend: The Greek-Australian Experience, 1984
- The Women Were There: Nineteen Women Who Enlivened Australia's History, 1988
- Always a Lady: Courageous Women of Colonial Australia, 1990
