= Still Murder =

1990 novel by Australian author Finola Moorhead

- Author: Finola Moorhead
- Language: English
- Genre: Crime novel
- Publisher: Penguin Books
- Publication date: 1990
- Publication place: Australia
- Media type: Print
- Pages: 423 pp.
- Awards: 1991 Victorian Premier's Prize for Fiction, winner
- ISBN: 9781760875091

Still Murder is a 1990 novel by the Australian author Finola Moorhead.

It was the winner of the 1991 Victorian Premier's Prize for Fiction.

== Synopsis ==
After a corpse is found by Sister Mary Ignatia under a marijuana crop in a public park, the case is taken over by Detective Senior Constable Margot Gorman. As the investigation progresses it becomes clear that this crime is part of a chain of such violent events that began with the rape of a young woman in Vietnam.

== Critical reception ==
Reviewing the novel in The Age Kate Ahearne found that "what really sets Moorhead's novel apart is the way she has understood the age-old formula of corpse and killer, clues and motive, mystery and mystery-solver, not simply as a wheelbarrow for a set of thoughts on the nature of life, but as a metaphor for it."

Gillian Whitlock in Southerly noted that the novel did not follow normal convetnions for this genre: "Still Murder proceeds not to resolution and the identification of the deviant individual, but to a diffusion of guilt and responsibility," and that "Moorhead goes much further in constructing a feminist reading position for her novel than authors of other contemporary feminist versions of the detective fiction."

== Publishing history ==
After the novel's initial publication by Penguin Books in 1990, it was reprinted by the same company in 1991, and then by Spinfex Press in Australia in 2002.

== Awards ==
- 1991 Victorian Premier's Prize for Fiction, winner

== See also ==
- 1990 in Australian literature
