= Gail Jones =

Australian novelist and academic

- Born: Harvey, Western Australia
- Education: University of Melbourne; University of Western Australia (BA, PhD)
- Writing career
- Language: English
- Years active: 1982–present
- Notable works: Dreams of Speaking, Sixty Lights, The Death of Noah Glass

Gail Jones is an Australian novelist and academic.

== Early life and career ==
Gail Jones was born in Harvey, Western Australia. She grew up in Broome and Kalgoorlie. She studied fine arts briefly at the University of Melbourne before returning to Western Australia where she took her undergraduate degree and PhD from the University of Western Australia in 1994. Her thesis was titled Mimesis and alterity: postcolonialism, ethnography and the representation of racial 'others'. She is currently Professor of Writing in the Writing and Society Research School at the Western Sydney University.

Jones has also contributed content for an art exhibition, The floating world by Jo Darbyshire (2009).

Since 2017 Jones has been involved in a research project Other Worlds: Forms of 'World Literature', for which she is leading a theme titled 'Form as Encounter' that is exploring intercultural intersections and encounters.

== Personal life ==
Jones has a daughter, Kyra Giorgi, who is also a writer.

== Awards ==
Jones was presented with the Lifetime Achievement in Literature Award by Creative Australia in 2024.

The House of Breathing

- T. A.G. Hungerford Award for an unpublished work of Fiction by a Western Australian Writer, 1991
- Barbara Ramsden Award Book of the Year, 1992
- Queensland Premier's Literary Awards Steele Rudd Award, 1993
- Western Australian Premier's Book Awards, Fiction winner 1993

Fetish Lives

- Western Australian Premier's Book Awards, Fiction joint-winner and Premier's Prize joint-winner 1997

Black Mirror

- Western Australian Premier's Book Awards, Fiction winner 2002
- Shortlisted The Age Book of the Year Award 2003
- Shortlisted The Courier-Mail Book of the Year 2003
- Longlist International Dublin Literary Award 2003
- Nita Kibble Literary Award, 2003

Sixty Lights

- Longlist Booker Prize 2004
- Western Australian Premier's Book Awards, Fiction winner 2004
- Western Australian Premier's Book Awards, Overall Prize 2004
- The Age Book of the Year Award for Fiction, winner, 2005
- ALS Gold Medal, 2005
- Shortlist Commonwealth Writers Award Pacific Region 2005
- Shortlist Miles Franklin Award 2005
- Shortlist New South Wales Premier's Literary Awards for Fiction 2005
- Shortlist Victorian Premier's Literary Awards for Fiction 2005
- Longlist International Dublin Literary Award 2006
- South Australian Premier's Awards, winner, 2006

Dreams of Speaking

- Longlisted for Orange Prize, 2006
- Shortlisted for Queensland Premier's Literary Awards, Premier's Prize, 2006
- Shortlisted for The Courier-Mail Book of the Year 2007
- Shortlisted for Miles Franklin Award, 2007
- Shortlisted for NSW Premier's Literary Award 2007
- Shortlisted for the International Dublin Literary Award, 2008

Sorry

- Shortlisted for Miles Franklin Award, 2008
- Shortlisted for Nita Kibble Literary Award 2008
- Longlisted for Orange Prize, 2008
- Shortlisted for Prime Minister's Literary Awards, 2008
- Shortlisted for Prix Femina Etranger (France) 2008
- Shortlisted for SA Premiers Fiction Prize 2008
- Shortlisted for Victorian Premier's Literary Awards 2008

Five Bells

- Longlisted for Miles Franklin Award, 2012
- Nita Kibble Literary Award, winner, 2012
- NSW Premier's Literary Awards People's Choice Award, winner, 2012

A Guide to Berlin

- Colin Roderick Award, Winner, 2015
- Shortlisted for NSW Premier's Literary Awards, 2015
- Shortlisted for the Voss Literary Prize, 2016
- Longlisted for the Stella Prize, 2016

The Death of Noah Glass

- Longlisted for the ALS Gold Medal, 2019
- Shortlisted for the Miles Franklin Award, 2019
- Prime Minister's Literary Awards, Fiction winner, 2019
- Shortlisted for the Victorian Premier's Prize for Fiction, 2019
- Shortlisted for the Voss Literary Prize, 2019
- Adelaide Festival Awards for Literature, 2020, Fiction Award

Our Shadows

- Longlisted for the Miles Franklin Award, 2021
- Shortlisted for the Victorian Premier's Prize for Fiction, 2021
- Shortlisted for the Voss Literary Prize, 2021

Salonika Burning

- ARA Historical Novel Prize for Adult, winner, 2023
- Shortlisted for the Barbara Jefferis Award, 2024

One Another

- Shortlisted for Christina Stead Prize for Fiction, NSW Premier's Literary Awards, 2025
- Shortlisted for the Colin Roderick Award, 2025
- Longlisted for Voss Literary Prize, 2025

== Published works ==
=== Novels ===
- Black Mirror (2002)
- Sixty Lights (2004)
- Dreams of Speaking (2006)
- Sorry (2007)
- Five Bells (2011)
- A Guide to Berlin (2015)
- The Death of Noah Glass (2018)
- Our Shadows (2020)
- Salonika Burning (2022)
- One Another (2024)
- The Name of the Sister (2025)

=== Short story collections ===
- The House of Breathing (1992)
- Fetish Lives (1997)

=== Critical works ===
- Dorothy Green Memorial Lecture Gail Jones, 'A Dreaming, a Sauntering: re-imagining critical paradigms' JASAL 5 (2006)
- The Piano (Australian Screen Classics), Currency Press (2007)

These works have been widely translated. The languages include Italian, German, French, Dutch, Portuguese, Spanish, Hebrew, Mandarin, Polish, Croatian and Czech.
