= Angela Savage =

Australian author (born 1966)

Angela Savage (born 1966) is an Australian author.

== Biography ==
Savage was born in Melbourne and educated at Siena College, Camberwell. She graduated from the University of Melbourne in 1989 with a BA (Combined Honours) in Criminology and the History and Philosophy of Science. She has worked for the Australian Red Cross in Southeast Asia, 1993–1998; for Sexual Health & Family Planning Australia in the South Pacific, 2000–2002; for the Victorian Council of Social Service, 2002–2007; and for the Association of Neighbourhood Houses and Learning Centres (Melbourne, Victoria), 2009–2014. Savage graduated from a PhD in Creative Writing from Monash University in 2018. She is currently the Chief Executive Officer of Public Libraries Victoria.

== Career ==
Savage won the Victorian Premier's Unpublished Manuscript Award in 2004 for Thai Died. Her first novel, based on this manuscript (Behind the Night Bazaar, Text Publishing, 2006), was shortlisted for the 2007 Ned Kelly Award for Best First Fiction. Her second novel (The Half-Child, Text Publishing, 2010) was shortlisted for the 2011 Ned Kelly Award for Best Fiction. In 2011 she won the Scarlet Stiletto prize for Australian women's short crime fiction, awarded by Sisters in Crime Australia, for 'The Teardrop Tattoos'. Her third novel (The Dying Beach, Text Publishing, 2013) was shortlisted for the 2014 Ned Kelly Award for Best Fiction, and the Sisters in Crime Australia 14th Davitt Awards for Australian Crime Writing by Women (Best Adult Novel). She contributed an essay to the collection, If I Tell You...I'll Have To Kill You: Australia's leading crime writers reveal their secrets (Michael Robotham ed., Allen & Unwin, 2013).

=== Books ===
- Behind the Night Bazaar, Text Publishing, 2006
- The Half-Child, Text Publishing, 2010
- The Dying Beach, Text Publishing, 2013
- Mother of Pearl, Transit Lounge Publishing, 2019

== Other ==
Christos Tsiolkas dedicated his fifth novel, Barracuda (Allen & Unwin, 2013), to Savage.
