= Sharon Kernot =

Australian novelist and poet

- Kernot in 2026
- Education: University of Adelaide (MA); Flinders University (PhD)
- Occupations: Novelist; poet
- Children: 2
- Writing career
- Language: English
- Genres: Verse novel; young adult fiction; poetry; short fiction
- Website: www.sharonkernot.com.au

Sharon Kernot is an Australian novelist and poet known for her verse novels The Art of Taxidermy (2018), Birdy (2024) and Night Swimming (2026).

Kernot earned a master's degree in writing from the University of Adelaide. She finished her PhD at Flinders University in 2012. Before publishing her novel, Underground Road in 2013, she worked in community services. She also mentored writers who had disabilities.

The Art of Taxidermy was shortlisted for the Text Prize. It was also shortlisted for the CBCA Book of the Year Awards. It was shortlisted for the Prime Minister's Literary Awards as well. Birdy was named a CBCA Honour Book in 2025. It won the Young Adult Fiction Award at the 2026 South Australian Literary Awards.

== Early life and education ==
Kernot was brought up in South Australia. Her parents came from different countries, and both migrated to Australia at age 14 and got married after some time. Her family used to spend time outside in nature by having drives in the Adelaide Hills, visiting her uncle's farm and also travelling to the national parks.

After leaving school, Kernot worked in the printing industry, and she faced many difficulties because there were males in her profession and they did not accept women in it. In her early twenties, Kernot spent some time in Greece.

Kernot obtained her master's degree in creative writing from the University of Adelaide. While attending university, she was introduced to the works of Dorothy Porter, whose verse novels inspired her passion for the genre. Prior to and during her postgraduate study, she worked as a social welfare officer for an organisation that fights against poverty in a disadvantaged neighborhood. In 2012, she earned a PhD degree from Flinders University. Her thesis, Writing poverty – The reflexive practitioner: Social welfare worker and creative artist, looked into gambling addiction within contemporary fiction literature and the ethics of using personal work experience.

Her community sector career lasted for more than two decades, involving child protection, mental health, financial counselling, and student advocacy. For eleven years, she worked as a community support worker for a child protection agency in the northern suburbs of Adelaide.

== Wiritng career ==
Kernot has previously worked at TAFE SA, University of South Australia and Flinders University. She is one of the founders of North Eastern Writers and was also involved in organising committee of Gawler Poets for two years. Kernot's books include short stories collection In the Shadows of the Garden and book of poems Washday Pockets both published by Ginninderra Press.

After reading Steven Herrick's The Simple Gift and the poetry of Dorothy Porter Wild Surmise and What a Piece of Work, Kernot became interested in verse novels. After finishing the draft of Underground Road, she tried rewriting it as a verse novel, but it remained in prose.

The first novel of Kernot titled Underground Road was published by Wakefield Press in 2013.

Kernot had been working as writer-in-residence of the SA Writers Centre's disability project for three years until July 2013. Her work involved mentoring writers with disabilities and offering guidance in publishing and grant applications. Also, she was a poet-in-residence at the Tea Tree Gully Poetry Festival in that year.

Kernot's first verse novel titled The Art of Taxidermy was based on a short story prompted by a university student's fascination with taxidermy. Her research entailed attending taxidermy demonstration sessions, museum visits, and photography and collection of animal remains. The book was released in July 2018. The book's atmosphere and exploration of themes such as loss, imagination, and art were praised in a review by The Saturday Paper in July 2018.

By July 2018, Kernot was granted funding by Arts SA to finish a short story collection and write a new verse novel for young adults in the lower Flinders Ranges region. In 2019, Kernot was employed as a publishing assistant for Garron Publishing. Her work has been published in literary journals and anthologies such as Southerly, Australian Love Stories, Mascara Literary Journal and Island Magazine.

Her second verse novel, Birdy, has been published by Text Publishing on 30 January 2024. Loss, longing, and connection to nature in her youth were some influences cited by Kernot in writing both Birdy and The Art of Taxidermy. She won the Varuna Residential Fellowship of 2024 for her novel The Deception of Dreams: A Novel in Verse.

Her debut adult verse novel, titled Night Swimming, was released by Text Publishing on 2 June 2026. Following an interaction with someone from her past over a decade before, the work was crafted using short story and stream-of-consciousness forms before she turned to verse. Her depiction of insomnia was based on her own personal experience of suffering insomnia for eighteen years.

(L–R) Sean William, Eileen Chong, Kernot, Peter Carnavas, Micaela Sahhar and Michelle de Kretser at the Meet the Winners of the 2026 National Published Book Awards event in the Mortlock Chamber

In an unpublished review in April 2026, Books+Publishing reviewer lauded the verse form, pace, and representation of trauma in the novel, while criticising the novel's last third and the increasing exaggeration of the antagonist. In June 2026, Fiona Wright of The Guardian praised the suspense, characterisation, and verse form of the book. Kernot was named as a participant in the 2026 Writers Assemble! festival.

== Honours and awards ==
Kernot's novel, Underground Road, was nominated under the category of Unpublished Manuscript at the Adelaide Festival Awards in 2010. Meanwhile, The Art of Taxidermy, was shortlisted for the 2017 Text Prize.

In 2019, The Art of Taxidermy received nominations for the CBCA Book of the Year Awards, the Ethel Turner Prize for Young People's Literature, and the Prime Minister's Literary Awards under the category of Young Adult Literature. The book also made it to the longlist for the Gold Inky Award. During the same year, Kernot's poem titled Eating Type won the Matthew Rocca Prize for poetry.

Birdy was a finalist for the Readings Young Adult Prize of 2024 and the Ethel Turner Prize. It became an Honour Book in the category of Older Readers at the 2025 CBCA Book of the Year Awards in August. In that same year, she won the Older Readers category of CBCA Shadow Judging Awards in 2025.

In November of 2026, Kernot won the South Australian Literary Awards' Young Adult Fiction Award for Birdy and got A$15,000.

== Personal life ==
In her early years, Kernot had a passion for animals, especially horses, and would spend most of her free time taking care of them and riding them in stables. As she grew up, she began spending more time reading, watching TV, working, and writing. Ever since she was a child, Kernot has been experiencing problems with communication.

Kernot has two children and resides in Mount Barker, South Australia, with her family.

== Publications ==
=== Novels and verse novels ===
- Kernot, Sharon (2013). Underground Road. Wakefield Press. ISBN 9781743051924.
- Kernot, Sharon (2018). The Art of Taxidermy. Text Publishing. ISBN 9781925603743.
- Kernot, Sharon (2024). Birdy. Text Publishing. ISBN 9781922790606.
- Kernot, Sharon (2026). Night Swimming. Text Publishing. ISBN 9781923058859.

=== Short-story collection ===
- Kernot, Sharon (2009). In the Shadows of the Garden. Ginninderra Press. ISBN 9781740275842.

=== Poetry ===
- Kernot, Sharon (2010). Washday Pockets. Ginninderra Press. ISBN 9781740276443.
- Kernot, Sharon (2013). Fishing (Poetry chapbook). Garron Publishing.
