= The Snow Kimono =

2014 novel by Australian author Mark Henshaw

- Author: Mark Henshaw
- Language: English
- Genre: Literary novel
- Publisher: Text Publishing
- Publication date: 27 August 2014
- Publication place: Australia
- Media type: Print
- Pages: 368 pp.
- Awards: 2015 New South Wales Premier's Literary Awards — Christina Stead Prize for Fiction, winner
- ISBN: 9781922182340

The Snow Kimono is a 2014 novel by the Australian author Mark Henshaw originally published by Text Publishing.

It was the winner of the 2015 New South Wales Premier's Literary Awards, Christina Stead Prize for Fiction.

== Synopsis ==
In Paris in 1989 August Jovert, a retired inspector of police, returns to his flat from hospital after a minor traffic accident. There he finds an old Japanese man waiting for him. That man is Tadashi Omura, former professor of law at the Imperial University of Japan, and both men, we discover, have lost daughters and deep family guilt in common. That guilt, and the lies the men have told themselves, finally catches up with them.

== Critical reception ==
In The Guardian Nicole Lee discovered a lot of depth in the novel: "Like a Japanese puzzle, prized for their infinite solutions and depth of revelation, each chapter builds on the one before, unfolding through levels of story to unpack deeper and deeper truths. And as the novel clicks into place like the final move in a himitsu-bako, it's clear that The Snow Kimono is not simply a novel about mysteries but a metaphor for the nature of storytelling."

Writing in Australian Book Review Delia Falconer found herself "with a queasy sense of discomfort, and not, I sense, of the sort intended" when she finished the book.

== Notes ==
- Dedication: To my wife, Lee. I could not have a better companion with whom to share this great adventure.
- Epigraph:

"I can be sure that even in this tiny, insignificant episode there is implicit everything I have experienced, all the past, the multiple pasts I have tried in vain to leave behind me..." Italo Calvino, If on a Winter's Night a Traveller

On his return, after many years' absence, Kenji-san went to see his blind friend. He told him of Abyssinia, that mysterious land, of his many adventures there. 'So, Keiichi,' he said, when he had finished. 'What do you think of Abyssinia?' 'It sounds like a magical place,' his friend said, as if returning from a dream. 'But I lied to you,' Kenji-san said. 'I was never there.' 'I know,' his friend replied. 'But I was.' Otomo No Tsurayuki, The Night of a Thousand Brocades

== Awards ==
- 2015 New South Wales Premier's Literary Awards – Christina Stead Prize for Fiction, winner
- 2015 Victorian Premier's Prize for Fiction, shortlisted

== See also ==
- 2014 in Australian literature
