= Mateship with Birds =

2012 novel by Carrie Tiffany

- First edition, Pan Macmillan Australia
- Author: Carrie Tiffany
- Language: English
- Set in: Rural Australia, 1950s
- Publisher: Picador, Australia
- Publication date: 21 June 2012
- Publication place: Australia
- Media type: Print (Paperback)
- Pages: 211
- ISBN: 9781742610764 (1st ed. AUS paperback)
- OCLC: 756699969
- LC Class: PR9619.4.T545 M38 2012
- Preceded by: Everyman's Rules for Scientific Living

Mateship with Birds is a 2012 novel by Australian novelist Carrie Tiffany which won the inaugural 2013 Stella Prize.

== Synopsis ==
The novel is set in the 1950s in Cohuna, a town in northern Victoria. Betty, a nurse, lives on the outskirts of town, next-door to dairy farmer Harry, whose wife has left him for a man from the local bird fanciers' club.

== Notes ==
- Dedication: For Peter

== Critical reception ==
Writing in The Guardian Janine Burke called the book a "raw and tender novel" and went on point out the connections between this novel and the book of the same title by Alec Chisholm.

Romana Kaval in The Monthly found "the book full of wisdom and humour."

== Awards and nominations ==
Year	Award	Category	Result	Ref
2013	Miles Franklin Award	—	Shortlisted	
2013	New South Wales Premier's Literary Awards	Christina Stead Prize for Fiction	Won	
2013	Stella Prize	—	Won	
2013	Women's Prize for Fiction	—	Longlisted	
2014	International Dublin Literary Award	—	Longlisted	
