= The World Without Us (novel) =

2015 novel by Australian author Mireille Juchau

- Author: Mireille Juchau
- Language: English
- Genre: Literary novel
- Publisher: Bloomsbury Publishing
- Publication date: 1 August 2015
- Publication place: Australia
- Media type: Print
- Pages: 293 pp.
- Awards: 2016 Victorian Premier's Prize for Fiction, winner
- ISBN: 9781408866504

The World Without Us is a 2015 novel by the Australian author Mireille Juchau.

It was the winner of the 2016 Victorian Premier's Prize for Fiction.

== Synopsis ==
The youngest daughter of the Müller family has died from leukaemia and the remaining members all grieve her loss in their own ways: Evangeline, the mother, becomes disengaged from the rest of the family; Tess the eldest child, has become totally silent; while Meg and her father try to hold the family together.

== Critical reception ==
Reviewing the novel in Australian Book Review Susan Lever noted "this novel addresses the grief of several characters who have lost family members, and it offers language and art as partial consolation."

In The Newtown Review of Books Anna Marfording found a continuity of sorts from the author's other works. "In her previous novels, as well as in The World Without Us, Juchau has demonstrated great psychological insight into the inner lives of her characters. One of her prime interests lies in exploring the aftermath of traumatic events, especially loss and grief, and in doing so, she illuminates the human condition...it is a story not only of loss and grief, motherlessness and environmental destruction, but also of survival, renewal and the importance of community."

== Publication history ==
After the novel's initial publication in Australia by Bloomsbury Publishing it was reprinted by the same publishing house in 2017.

== Notes ==
- Dedication: For Roger and Guy

== Awards ==
- 2016 Victorian Premier's Prize for Fiction, winner
- 2016 Miles Franklin Award, longlisted
- 2016 Stella Prize, shortlisted
- 2016 Voss Literary Prize, shortlisted

== See also ==
- 2015 in Australian literature
