= Sorry (novel) =

2007 novel by Gail Jones

- First edition
- Author: Gail Jones
- Language: English
- Genre: Novel
- Publisher: Vintage Books, Australia
- Publication date: 2007
- Publication place: Australia
- Media type: Print (Paperback)
- Pages: 218 pp
- ISBN: 1-74166-900-6
- OCLC: 213605318
- LC Class: PR9619.3.J6863 S67 2007b
- Preceded by: Dreams of Speaking
- Followed by: Five Bells

Sorry is a 2007 novel by Australian author Gail Jones.

== Themes ==
The novel explores the major themes of Australian Aboriginal-White relations, the isolation and despair of farm life, the Stolen Generations, and life during World War II in Australia.

== Dedication ==
"For Veronica Brady."

== Critical reception ==
- The judges of the 2008 Women's Prize for Fiction noted: "Through this exquisite story of a young girl’s survival against the odds, Gail Jones explores the values of friendship, loyalty and sacrifice with a skill that has already earned her numerous accolades for her previous novels Dreams of Speaking and Sixty Lights."
- Goldsworthy, Kerry (12 May 2007). "Sorry: A literary reconciliation". The Age.
- Review in The Australian
- "Review". The Sydney Morning Herald. 4 May 2007.

== Awards ==
- Miles Franklin Literary Award, 2008: shortlisted
- Orange Prize for Fiction (UK), 2008: longlisted
- Nita Kibble Literary Award, 2008: shortlisted
- Prime Minister's Literary Awards, Fiction, 2008: shortlisted
