= Taller When Prone =

2010 Australian poetry collection by Les Murray

- Author: Les Murray
- Language: English
- Genre: Poetry collection
- Publisher: Black Inc.
- Publication date: 2010
- Publication place: Australia
- Media type: Print
- Pages: 89 pp
- Awards: 2012 Adelaide Festival Awards for Literature – John Bray Poetry Award, winner
- ISBN: 9781863954709

Taller When Prone is a collection of poems by Australian poet Les Murray, published by Black Inc. in 2010.

The collection contains 61 poems reprinted from a number of Australian literary journals and poetry anthologies, with many published here for the first time.

== Contents ==
- "From a Tourist Journal"
- "Bluelookout Mountain"
- "The Sharman Drum"
- "The Toppled Head"
- "Definitions"
- "The Conversations"
- "The Double Diamond"
- "As Country was Slow"
- "The Death of Isaac Nathan, 1864"
- "The Filo Soles"
- "Midi"
- "Observing the Mute Cat"
- "Buttress on a High Cutting"
- "Ovoids"
- "Nursing Home"
- "Fame"
- "Cattle-Hoof Hardpan"
- "Phone Canvas"
- "King Lear Had Alzheimers"
- "Science Fiction"
- "Atlantic Pavements"
- "Refusing Saul's Armour"
- "Our Dip in the Rift Valley"
- "Brown Suits"
- "Southern Hemisphere Garden"
- "Two Scapes"
- "The Suspect Corpse"
- "Eucalypts in Exile"
- "The Monroe Survey"
- "Reading by Starlight"
- "Cherries from Young"
- "Lunar Eclipse"
- "Croc"
- "High Speed Bird"
- "The Cowladder Stanza"
- "The Farm Terraces"
- "The Drizzle of Chefs' Knives"
- "The Sphere"
- "The Submerged Chute of Bass Strait"
- "Visiting Geneva"
- "The Bronze Bull"
- "Greaseproof Rose"
- "The Springfields"
- "Rugby Wheels"
- "A Frequent Flyer Proposes a Name"
- "Hesiod on Bushfire"
- "The Blame"
- "Singing Tour in Vietnam"
- "Midwinter Kangaroo Nest"
- "The 41st Year of 1968"
- "Daylight Cloth"
- "The Mirrorball"
- "Infinite Anthology"
- "Wrecked Birds"
- "At the Opera"
- "The Relative Gold"
- "The Cartoonist"
- "Natal Grass"
- "The Fallen Golfer"
- "The Man in the White Bay Hotel"
- "Winding Up at the Bootmaker's"

== Critical reception ==
In his review of the collection for The Sydney Morning Herald critic Andrew Reimer noted the poet's "cosmopolitan and erudite way with words", before commenting that the collection "bubbles with all manner of curious phraseology and recondite information, the startling juxtaposition of the commonplace and the arcane."

Peter Craven in The Age, while reviewing the book, labelled the poet "a kind of natural-born opera house of poetic originality, a walking Uluru of what we dread or revere about ourselves."

== Awards ==
- 2010 The Age Book of the Year Award – Dinny O'Hearn Poetry Prize, shortlisted
- 2010 Arts Queensland Judith Wright Calanthe Award, shortlisted
- 2012 Adelaide Festival Awards for Literature – John Bray Poetry Award, winner

== Publication history ==
After the collection's initial publication by Black Inc. in 2010 it was reprinted as follows:

- 2010, Carcanet, UK
- 2011, Farrar, Straus and Giroux, USA
- 2012, Faber, UK

== Notes ==
At the time of the publication of the collection Murray was interviewed by Jason Steger for The Age newspaper.

== See also ==
- 2010 in Australian literature
