= Damascus (novel) =

2019 novel by Australian author Christos Tsiolkas

- Author: Christos Tsiolkas
- Language: English
- Genre: Literary novel
- Publisher: Allen & Unwin
- Publication date: November 2019
- Publication place: Australia
- Media type: Print
- Pages: 423 pp.
- Awards: 2020 Victorian Premier's Prize for Fiction, winner
- ISBN: 9781760875091

Damascus is a 2019 novel by the Australian author Christos Tsiolkas.

It was the winner of the 2020 Victorian Premier's Prize for Fiction.

== Synopsis ==
The novel centres on St. Paul of the New Testament. It covers the period 35-87 CE, from the period leading up to his conversion to approximately 20 years after his death.

== Critical reception ==
Reviewing the novel for The Guardian, David Marr observers that Tsiolkas "writes about living men and women who are never more human than when they're being dragged this way and that by charismatic leaders like Paul." And he goes on to point that that "Thomas is Tsiolkas's man: a disciple full of doubts, not ashamed of his humanity, trusting only his eyes and ears. How could he not be a novelist's hero?"

Kerryn Goldsworth, in Australian Book Review comments: "Tsiolkas is a harsh poet of the body, and this novel resembles his previous work in its preoccupation with bodily functions and experience, and in its insistence on keeping flesh and blood to the fore." She goes on to caution "Reading this novel requires a balancing act from the reader: to keep track of its characters and follow its sometimes disorienting narrative trail by recalling whatever one knows or remembers of the New Testament, and at the same time to remember that Tsiolkas is taking the sorts of liberties a biblical reimagining requires".

== Publishing history ==
After the novel's initial publication by Allen & Unwin in 2019, it was published in the UK by Atlantic Books in 2020.

== Awards ==
- 2020 Victorian Premier's Prize for Fiction, winner

== See also ==
- 2019 in Australian literature
