= Black Mirror (novel) =

2002 novel by Gail Jones

- Author: Gail Jones
- Language: English
- Genre: novel
- Publisher: Picador, Australia
- Publication date: 2002
- Publication place: Australia
- Media type: Print (Paperback)
- Pages: 304
- ISBN: 0330363565
- Followed by: Sixty Lights

Black Mirror (2002) is a novel by Australian author Gail Jones. It won the Fiction category of the Western Australian Premier's Book Awards in 2002 and the Nita Kibble Literary Award in 2003.

== Plot summary ==
A biographer, Anna Griffin, is interviewing Victoria Morrell about her childhood in a gold-mining town in Western Australia and her subsequent flight to Paris in the 1930s, as a young artist. There Victoria found herself caught up in a surrealist circle of painters and writers (André Breton, Marcel Duchamp, Max Ernst, even Salvador Dalí). As the interview progresses Anna comes to examine her own childhood in the same town some 60 years later.

== Notes ==
- Dedication: "For my parents".

== Reviews ==
- Judith Armstrong, in Australian Book Review, called the book "an alluring example of the retrospective novel, one that uses the device of a biographer's interviews with her subject to prod the reconstruction of memories."
- Naomi Oreb, in Sydney Studies in English, argues that Black Mirror "foregrounds the need to rectify past and present injustices and the importance of Indigenous Reconciliation through the filter of the surrealist art movement."

== Awards and nominations ==
- 2002 winner - Western Australian Premier's Book Awards — Fiction
- 2003 winner - Nita Kibble Literary Award
- 2003 - shortlisted The Age Book of the Year Award — Fiction Prize
