= Elise Valmorbida =

Italian-Australian writer and creative writing tutor

- Born: Melbourne, Victoria, Australia
- Occupation: Writer
- Writing career
- Notable awards: 2019 Victorian Premier's Prize for Fiction winner
- Website: elisevalmorbida.com

Elise Valmorbida is an Italian-Australian writer and creative writing tutor who lives in London, England.

== Biography ==
Having graduated in English from the University of Melbourne, and later in graphic design from Central St. Martin's, Valmorbida was creative director at The Body Shop, then at Anglo-American brand agency Fitch. She is now the creative director of Word-Design.

Her debut novel Matilde Waltzing was published in 1997 and nominated for two national literary awards. Her second book, a collection of true love stories, The Book Of Happy Endings was published in the UK, Australasia and America in 2007. In the following year, it was published in new translated editions in Korea (publ. Woongjing) and Germany (publ. Droemer). Her short stories have been published internationally via The Ian St James Award, Carve Magazine and anthologies such as From Here to Here, Common Ground, and The Bard & Co. Her satirical novel The TV President was published by CB Editions in October 2008. It was described in The Times Literary Supplement as "luridly entertaining fiction". Her novel The Winding Stick was published by Two Ravens Press in May 2009. It was hailed as "a literary classic in the making" and voted book of the year by reviewer A. Brooke on literary website Vulpes Libris. In 2013, the Serbian edition of The Book of Happy Endings was launched by publishers Vulkan.

In 2016, The Bookseller reported that Valmorbida's historical novel The Madonna of the Mountains, dubbed "a 21st-century Gone with the Wind", was to be published by Faber & Faber in 2018.

The Madonna of the Mountains was first published in spring 2018 to critical acclaim, including The Times Book of the Month. The cover and endpaper design by Liberty London was the first title in Faber's new partnership with Liberty. The US edition was published by Spiegel & Grau, launching in June 2018. Translations of the novel include Czech, German, French, Russian, Polish, Dutch and other editions. At the 2019 Victorian Premier's Literary Awards it won the Prize for Fiction.

In September 2021, Laurence King (Orion/Hachette) published Valmorbida's The Happy Writing Book, a non-fiction guide to creative writing and wellbeing, winning praise from Bryony Lavery, John-Paul Flintoff, and Oliver Kamm of The Times who wrote "There are many guides to good writing but none as valuable as this." Author and Guardian columnist Tobias Jones chose it as one of his books of the year. In January 2022, the French edition was published (Pyramyd Editions) with the title Le Bonheur D'Écrire. The Chinese edition 寫作的本事: 無畏、熱情與想像力, 英國寫作教母的創意指引與私房筆記 was published in 2023.

Valmorbida was one of eight 'Women of Liberty' photographed by Mary McCartney.

Valmorbida is a creative writing tutor at Central Saint Martin's, University of the Arts, London, Guardian Masterclasses, Faber Academy and Arvon Foundation. She also leads creative writing workshops at literary festivals and community-building organisations. For five years, she was External Examiner for the Professional Writing MA at Falmouth University. She was a board director of writers' association '26'. In 2017, she was D&AD President of Jury (Writing for Design). In early 2026, she was appointed to the advisory board of The Literary Consultancy.

In 2007, she produced Saxon, a micro-budget independent film released in 2009. SAXON toured international film festivals in Edinburgh, Israel, and Europe. The film was nominated for the Michael Powell Award (Best New British Feature) at the Edinburgh International Film Festival, and won the European Independent Film Festival's Best European Dramatic Feature award.

Valmorbida was honoured as a Trailblazer by the Edinburgh International Film Festival 2007.

Valmorbida's unique phrase "a carnival of snackery" (written and copyrighted for Dishoom in 2012), was taken as the title for a book by David Sedaris published in 2021. The use of her words as the book's title was referenced in his diary entry dated March 23, 2013, but his book was published in various editions without proper acknowledgment.

== Bibliography ==
=== Novels ===
- Matilde Waltzing, Allen and Unwin, 1997
- The TV President, CB Editions, 2008
- The Winding Stick, Two Ravens Press, 2009
- The Madonna of the Mountains, Faber, 2018

=== Non-fiction ===
- The Book of Happy Endings : True Stories About Finding Love, Cyan, 2007
- Saxon: The making of a guerrilla film, CB Editions, 2008
- The Happy Writing Book : Discover the Positive Power of Creative Writing, Laurence King / Hachette, 2021

== Awards ==
Valmorbida has received awards from the Commonwealth Scholarship Commission, RSA and Edinburgh International Film Festival. Her novel The Madonna of the Mountains won the Victorian Premier's Literary Awards for fiction, was shortlisted for the 2019 Edward Stanford Award for Fiction, and listed as a Walter Scott Prize Academy Recommendation.
