= Rosanne Hawke =

Australian young adult/children's book author (born 1953)

- Born: 1953 (age 72–73) Penola, South Australia, Australia
- Occupation: Author
- Genre: Young adult and children's literature

Website
- www.rosannehawke.com

Rosanne Hawke (born 1953) is an Australian author from Penola, South Australia who has written over 25 books for young adults and children. She teaches tertiary level creative writing (especially writing for children) at Tabor Adelaide. She has a PhD in creative writing from the University of Adelaide.

== Writing career ==
Hawke lives in a little old Cornish farmhouse near Kapunda, South Australia, and has spent significant time researching Cornish identity in Australian children's literature. She writes about culture, faith, relationships, displacement and belonging, music and cats.

Her first short story was published in the magazine of Moura State School, Queensland in 1967 when she was in grade 8. At 14 years, she moved back to South Australia and attended Gawler High School where she won an Arts Scholarship to complete Years 11 & 12. She started a romantic novel when she was 17 but burnt it later. It wasn't until Rosanne was working in the Middle East and Pakistan, teaching English as a Second Language and bringing up kids that she started to write seriously.

Rosanne was shortlisted for the Australian Aurealis Awards and was a winner in the Kanga Awards Focus List. Some of her best recognised books include Kelsey and the Quest of the Porcelain Doll (a Children's Book Council of Australia Notable Book), Across the Creek, (winner of the Cornish 2005 Holyer an Gof Award for Children's Literature) and Taj and the Great Camel Trek (2012 Adelaide Festival Children's Book Award). She has been awarded a Tabor Adelaide Award for Teaching Excellence, 2009 Australian Learning and Teaching Council, "Citation For Outstanding Contribution to Student Learning", she won a Carclew Fellowship at SA Writers Week 2006, is the recipient of the 2014 Nance Donkin Award, and is officially a Bard of Cornwall.

According to Emma Bennett, Hawke pioneered multicultural approaches to writing for children. Her work as a teacher in Pakistan and the United Arab Emirates may have contributed to this slant.

== Honours ==
- Jehan and the quest of the lost dog – Children's Book Council of Australia (CBCA) Notable Book 2018.
- Awarded the Carclew Fellowship, at Writers Week, Adelaide 2008.
- Awarded 'Bard of Cornwall' in 2006
- Mustara Shortlisted in NSW Premier Literary Awards 2007, and CBCA Notable Book.
- Across the Creek – winner of the children's section of the Cornish 2005 Holyer and Gof Trophy.
- Soraya the Storyteller – shortlisted in 2005 Australian Children's Book Awards and in SA Festival Awards; commended in The Victorian Premier's Awards; chosen as One Book One Salisbury in the Salisbury Writers' Festival.
- Wolfchild – Commendation in the open Cornish 2004 Hoyler and Gof Trophy, shortlisted for Aurealis Awards 2003, Australian Children's Book Council Notable Book, nominated for Kanga Awards.
- Sailmaker – Australian Children's Book Council Notable Book, and shortlisted for Kanga Awards, 2003.
- The Keeper – chosen for The Adelaide Collection.
- Re-entry – Australian Children's Book Council Notable Book 1996, nominated for CROWS Award 1996.
- Jihad – shortlisted for Christian Schools Book Award 1999.
- Arts SA literature grant 2007.
- Asialink Fellowship to Pakistan 2006
- May Gibbs Fellowship 2004
- Varuna Fellowship 2000
- ARTSA Emerging Artists Grants 1999 and 1996
- Out of time funds granted for Literary Trip to Cornwall by Country Arts SA and Arts SA 2005.

== Bibliography ==
- A Year and a Day Book 1; Wolfchild, (revised re-release) 2017 Stone Table Books
- Across the Creek (revised re-release) 2017, Stone Table Books
- Jehan and the Quest of the Lost Dog, 2017 UQP.
- Beyond Borders, Book 3: Liana's Dance, 2017 Rhiza Press.
- The Tales of Jahani book 2: The Leopard Princess, 2017 UQP
- The Tales of Jahani book 1: Daughter of Nomads, 2016 UQP
- Beyond Borders, book 1: Dear Pakistan (3rd edn Re-entry) 2016
- BeyondBorders, book 2: The War Within (3rd edn Re-entry) 2016
- The Truth About Peacock Blue, 2015 Allen & Unwin
- Mustara PBK edn, 2015, Wombat Books
- Kerenza: A New Australian, 2015 Omnibus Books
- Kelsey and the Quest of the Porcelain Doll, 2014 UQP (2014 CBCA, 'Notable Book')
- Zenna Dare, 2nd edn, Rhiza Press. 2014
- Shahana: Through My Eyes, 2013 Allen & Unwin
- Killer Ute, 2013 UQP
- Sailmaker (2nd edn) 2013 UQP
- The Keeper (2nd edn), 2013 UQP
- Mountain Wolf, 2012 Harper Collins
- The Messenger Bird, 2012 UQP
- Taj and the Great Camel Trek, 2011 UQP, (2012 Adelaide Festival Children’s Book Award, Shortlisted NSW Premier's Literary Awards, 2012 CBCA “Notable Book”)
- Marrying Ameera, 2010 HarperCollins (2011 CBCA 'Notable Book')
- The Wish Giver, (with Penner, L) M Macintosh (illus), 2008 Windy Hollow
- The Last Virgin in Year 10, 2006 Hachette
- Mustara, R. Ingpen (illus), 2006 Lothian Books (shortlisted 2007 NSW Premier's Literary Awards & 2007 CBCA, “Notable Book”)
- The Collector, 2004 Lothian Books
- Soraya, the Storyteller, 2004 Lothian Books (shortlisted 2006 South Australian Festival Awards, 2005 Australian CBCA, commendation 2005 Victoria Premier's Awards)
- Yardil, E. Stanley (illus), 2004 Benchmark
- Across the Creek, 2004 Lothian Books (winner of the Cornish 2005 Holyer an Gof Award for Children’s Literature)
- Borderland, (Re-entry 1995, Jihad 1996, Cameleer) 2003 Lothian
- Wolfchild, 2003 Lothian (commendation 2004 Gorseth of Cornwall, Holyer an Gof Awards, shortlisted 2004 Australian Aurealis Awards, 2004 CBCA, “Notable Book”)
- Zenna Dare, 2002 Lothian
- Sailmaker, 2002 Lothian (2003 CBCA, “Notable Book”)
- A Kiss in Every Wave, 2001 Lothian
- The Keeper, 2000 Lothian
- Jihad, 1996 Albatross.
- Re-entry, 1995 Albatross. (1996 CBCA, “Notable Book” )

=== Critical studies and reviews ===
- Macintyre, Pam (September 2011). "[Review of] Taj and the Great Camel Trek". Australian Book Review (334): 67.
