= The Architect (novel) =

Book by John A. Scott

- Author: John Scott
- Language: English
- Genre: novel
- Publisher: Penguin, Australia
- Publication date: 2001
- Publication place: Australia
- Media type: Print (Paperback)
- Pages: 174
- ISBN: 0670910449
- Preceded by: Before I Wake
- Followed by: Warra Warra

The Architect (2001) is a novel by Australian author John Scott.

It was shortlisted for the Adelaide Festival Awards for Literature, the Victorian Premier's Prize and the 2002 Miles Franklin Award, an annual literary prize awarded to "a novel which is of the highest literary merit and presents Australian life in any of its phases"

== Plot summary ==
The novel tells the story of two architects: successful young Australian Andrew Martin, and neglected Johannes Von Ruhland. When Martin meets Von Ruhland in Berlin he is drawn into the older man's world.

== Reception ==
In an interview with The Age following the novel's Miles Franklin Award shortlist announcement, Scott admitted to being disappointed by how his novel was initially received and had nearly given up on writing fiction because of the cold reception. "It had a number of spiteful reviews and hardly sold any copies. I could see my literary career being dismantled in front of my eyes". He later expressed hope that the unexpected shortlisting will mean that "the book won't sink without trace."

== Notes ==
- Dedication: For Elizabeth Francis and John Hughes
- Epitaph: "Shall mortal man be more just than God? / Shall a man be more pure than his maker?" Job 4: 17

== Awards and nominations ==
- 2002 shortlisted Miles Franklin Award
- 2002 shortlisted Victorian Premier's Literary Awards — The Vance Palmer Prize for Fiction
- 2002 shortlisted Adelaide Festival Awards for Literature
