= Smokehouse (story collection) =

2020 short story collection by Australian author Melissa Manning

- Author: Melissa Manning
- Language: English
- Genre: Short story collection
- Publisher: University of Queensland Press
- Publication date: 2 July 2020
- Publication place: Australia
- Media type: Print
- Pages: 253 pp.
- Awards: 2022 Victorian Premier's Prize for Fiction, winner
- ISBN: 9780702263026

Smokehouse is a 2020 short story collection by the Australian author Melissa Manning.

It was the winner of the 2022 Victorian Premier's Prize for Fiction.

== Synopsis ==
This is a collection of nine inter-connected short stories set in a small community in Tasmania.

== Critical reception ==
Reviewing the collection for Australian Book Review Elizabeth Byer noted: "The fulcrum on which all these stories balance is personal devastation. We encounter characters still in the thick of grief after losing someone, whether to death, illness, or drugs. Often this loss serves as a moment and a perspective from which to survey the rest of life, a way to apprehend time." She went on to conclude "Yet it would be remiss of me not to emphasise that the personal grief and family breakdown is narrated with emotional maturity. The unfussy prose is an apt vehicle, and there are no false notes."

== Awards ==
- 2022 Victorian Premier's Prize for Fiction, winner

== See also ==
- 2020 in Australian literature
