= The Madonna of the Mountains =

2018 novel by Australian author Elise Valmorbida

- Author: Elise Valmorbida
- Language: English
- Genre: Literary novel
- Publisher: Faber & Faber
- Publication date: 29 March 2018
- Publication place: UK
- Media type: Print
- Pages: 384 pp.
- Awards: 2019 Victorian Premier's Prize for Fiction, winner
- ISBN: 9780571336326

The Madonna of the Mountains is a 2018 novel by the Australian author Elise Valmorbida.

It was the winner of the 2019 Victorian Premier's Prize for Fiction.

== Synopsis ==
The novel is set in the period from the 1920s to the 1950s in the Veneto region in northern Italy. It follows the life of Maria from the time she is introduced to her future husband, through the rise of Italian Fascism and the Second World War.

== Critical reception ==
Reviewing the novel for Readings bookstore Mark Rubbo was rather impressed with the work: "This is a finely drawn portrait of a society in transition, and of one woman's desperate attempts to hold together her family. Elise Valmorbida has managed to create a very powerful and compelling book."

== Awards ==
- 2019 Victorian Premier's Prize for Fiction, winner

== See also ==
- 2018 in Australian literature
