= John A. Scott =

English-Australian poet, novelist and academic

John Alan Scott
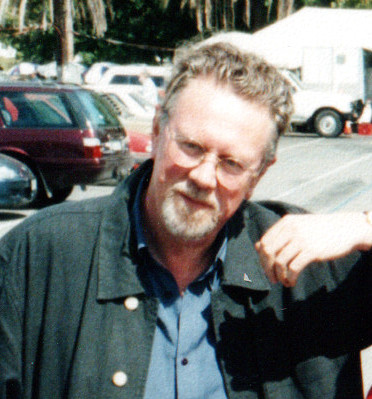
- Scott at the Adelaide Fringe in 2000
- Born: John Alan Scott; 23 April 1948 (age 78); Littlehampton, West Sussex, England
- Education: Monash University
- Occupations: Poet; novelist; academic
- Years active: 1970–present

John Alan Scott (who has published under the names John A. Scott and John Scott) (born 23 April 1948) is an English-Australian poet, novelist and academic.

== Biography ==
Scott was born in Littlehampton in Sussex, England, migrating to Australia during his childhood and residing mainly in Melbourne since 1959. He attended Monash University, where he was a contemporary of fellow poets Alan Wearne and Laurie Duggan.

A former freelance scriptwriter for radio and television, working on such shows as The Aunty Jack Show (1974), It's Magic (1974) and The Garry McDonald Show (1977).

He first became known in the literary world as a poet. Throughout the 1970s and 1980s, his work developed in an 'experimental' direction unusual in Australian poetry, owing partly to his interest in translation. In 1985 he was one of Four Australian Poets group that toured the US and Canada reading poetry. He also edited and translated Emmanuel Hocquard : Elegies and Other Works (1989).

Since the 1990s he has concentrated on producing novels. This change was occasioned in part by an Australia Council studio fellowship in Paris which he shared with the Australian novelist Mark Henshaw. His work has won him the Victorian Premier's Award twice, in 1986 and again in 1994. The novel, What I Have Written, has been filmed from his own screenplay and he has been translated into French, German and Slovenian.

He has taught in the Faculty of Creative Arts at Wollongong University but now writes full-time.

== Awards ==
- 1984: Newcastle Poetry Prize for St. Clair
- 1986: C. J. Dennis Prize for Poetry for St. Clair
- 1994: Victorian Premier's Literary Award for What I Have Written
- 2013: Peter Porter Poetry Prize for "Four Sonnets"

== Bibliography ==
=== Poetry ===
- The Barbarous Sideshow (1975)
- From the Flooded City (1981)
- Smoking (1983)
- The Quarrel with Ourselves & Confession (Rigmarole, 1984) ISBN 0-909229-27-9
- St. Clair: Three Narratives (UQP, 1986) ISBN 0-7022-1907-X
- Singles: Shorter Poems, 1982-1986 (1989)
- Translation (Picador, 1990) ISBN 0-330-27196-2
- Selected Poems (UQP, 1995) ISBN 0-7022-2688-2
- Shorter Lives (Puncher & Wattman, 2020) ISBN 9781925780482

=== Novels ===
- Blair (McPhee Gribble, 1988) ISBN 0-14-011093-3
- What I Have Written (Penguin, 1994) ISBN 0-14-026199-0
- Before I Wake (Penguin, 1996) ISBN 0-14-025695-4
- The Architect (Penguin, 2001) ISBN 0-670-91044-9
- Warra Warra (Text, 2003) ISBN 1-877008-55-9
- N (Brandl & Schlesinger, 2014) ISBN 978-1-921556-20-3
