= A Guide to Berlin (novel) =

2015 novel by Gail Jones

- 1st edition (publ. Vintage Books)
- Author: Gail Jones
- Language: English
- Genre: Fiction
- Set in: Berlin
- Publisher: Vintage Books
- Publication date: 2015
- Publication place: Australia
- Awards: Colin Roderick Award

A Guide to Berlin is a 2015 novel by Australian author Gail Jones. With the same name as Vladimir Nabokov's short story A Guide to Berlin, Jones' novel follows the main character, a young Australian woman named Cass, as she travels to Berlin and meets with five other travellers in the city. The six members form a literary group, all inspired at one point in their lives by Nabokov's life and works, and share their personal stories which they call speak-memories. Towards the end of the novel, a moment of violence within the group changes the direction and tone of the story.

== Plot ==
The novel begins with one member of the literary group, Marco Gianelli, giving a short eulogy for the deceased, who remains without identity at this point. In the next chapter, it cuts to Cass’ third person point of view as she describes the scenery in wintry Berlin. Cass goes to her first literary meeting and the reader is introduced to the other five members, “Victor from New York, Marco and Gino from Rome, Yukio and Mitsuko from Tokyo”, and Cass from Sydney. The reader learns how Cass came to join this group; she met Marco as they both stood in front of Vladimir Nabokov's old dwelling, as they both took a photo of the building, and Marco came to invite her to the literary group.

The meetings take place gradually over a few weeks, with each person sharing their own speak-memory. In between the meetings, Cass visits landmarks with different people, such as going to the Pergamon Museum with Marco, aquarium with Victor and the S-Bahn with Mitsuko.

After every person's speak-memory, they agree to two weeks without a meeting, and then schedule the next one in Cass’ apartment. Gino is strained and tense and makes a speech about how they are all pretentious and snobbish. Victor comforts Gino and the two men move onto the apartment's balcony. The men become angry, although we are not told what is said, and in a single moment, Gino lifts Victor up and drops him over the balcony edge. A caretaker is called and Victor's body is driven to the edge of a river and sunk into the water. Gino commits suicide soon after.

== Characters ==
=== Victor ===
At the first meeting, Victor tells his speak-memory of how he was born in New Jersey and of his overprotective mother and his father who worked in an umbrella factory. He tells of how his father died early due to illness, and how Victor's parents were Polish survivors of the Holocaust. In particular, he speaks of the poverty he felt after his father died, the resentment his mother felt towards wealthier women in the neighborhood and how Victor used to chant “umbrella, umbrella” to cope with his nerves.

=== Mitsuko ===
At the second meeting, Mitsuko tells her speak-memory. She was born in Hagi, Yamaguchi Prefecture and her father was a potter. Mitsuko moved to Tokyo to try for a good university and follow her dream of becoming an English translator. She rebelled against her disciplinarian aunt and begun to dress in Lolita fashion. Although she entered university, Mitsuko left to become a rental sister, to help hikikomori come out of their rooms. During this job, she met Yukio, her boyfriend and lover, and they travelled to Berlin together.

=== Yukio ===
At the third meeting, Yukio tells his speak-memory. He speaks of how he was traumatized as a boy by the Tokyo subway gas attacks of 1995 in his city, how his older brother constantly taunted him and how he enjoyed playing chess with his grandfather. When Yukio was sixteen, he retreated into his room and his “double-click world”. After four years of his hikikomori life, Mitsuko came as a rental sister to Yukio's house and began to talk to him through the door. After many weeks, Yukio finally left his room and began meeting Mitsuko.

=== Gino ===
At the fourth meeting, Gino tells his speak-memory, the last one told in the Oblomov apartment. His father died aged thirty-seven, the same day when Gino himself was born, from injuries received from the bombing of the Bologna Centrale train station. His mother carried a pained atmosphere with her, raising Gino and his four elder sisters by herself. Gino's father had been an accountant but also with literary aspirations, hence how Gino came to be interested in Nabokov's work. After Gino's speak-memory, Marco mentions that there are thousands of unexploded bombs beneath Berlin, and all six people imagine what Berlin would look like if exploded.

=== Marco ===
At the fifth meeting, Marco tells his speak-memory. He was born on the same day of the year as Nabokov and Shakespeare and blamed his epilepsy as the reason his father left their family. Despite his efforts to find him, Marco never could. His uncle in Australia paid for his education and Marco discovered the power of reading quietly while at university. After Marco's story, Victor jokes that these meetings are therapy sessions, leading to tensions between him and Gino, who becomes aggressive in response.

=== Cass ===
Finally Cass presents her own speak-memory, telling of how she grew up in Broome in a house which had once been a quarantine station, how she used to fight with her three older brothers and how she was sent to boarding school as a child. Cass went to London to study art, then to Sydney to study literature. It is only after her speak-memory, when Marco and Cass are alone together, that Cass reveals her brother Alexander died during a cyclone when she was twelve.

== Reception ==
Independent praised Jones' novel and stated that, although the story was slightly heavy, her ability to write reflectively was one of her strengths. The Guardian said that although the novel looked promising, it was disappointing and did not live up to Nabokov's writing standards. The Sydney Morning Herald observed that Jones included many Nabokovian elements in her novel, such as one character having the same birthday as the Russian author

== Awards ==
- Colin Roderick Award, 2015: winner
- The Voss Literary Prize, 2016: second
- Barbara Jefferis Award, 2016: shortlisted
- Nita B Kibble Literary Awards, Kibble Literary Award, 2016: longlisted
- NSW Premier's Literary Awards, Christina Stead Prize for Fiction, 2016: shortlisted
- The Indie Book Awards, 2016: shortlisted
- The Stella Prize, 2016: longlisted
- Western Australia Premier's Book Awards, 2016: shortlisted
