= The Burrow (novel) =

2024 novel by Melanie Cheng

- Author: Melanie Cheng
- Genre: Fiction
- Publisher: Text Publishing
- Publication date: 1 October 2024
- Publication place: Australia
- Pages: 192
- ISBN: 9781922790941

The Burrow is a 2024 novel by Melanie Cheng. The book, which is set during the COVID-19 pandemic, follows a family in the aftermath of their daughter's accidental drowning four years prior. After the family adopts a pet rabbit, they begin to move past their estrangement. The book draws on themes and imagery from a short story of the same name by Franz Kafka.

== Reception ==
The book was reviewed in The Guardian, The Saturday Paper, The Age, and Meanjin. Reviewing the book in The Age, Carmel Bird described the book as "exquisite" and as "a frank exploration of grief, of its colour, texture and reach". In a review for The Guardian, Jack Callil called the book "a story of familial tensions, parenthood and grief in the wake of trauma, condensed into a novella". The book was shortlisted for the Stella Prize and was described by the judging panel as being "among those wonderful creations that continue their careful work long after the final page has been turned".

== Awards ==
Awards for The Burrow
Year	Award	Category	Result	Ref.
2025	Stella Prize	—	Shortlisted	
2025	Victorian Premier's Literary Awards	Fiction	Shortlisted	
2025	Australian Book Industry Awards	Small Publishers' Adult Book of the Year	Shortlisted	
2025	Miles Franklin Award	—	Longlisted	
2025	Voss Literary Prize	—	Longlisted	
