= JF Was Here =

1990 novel by Australian author Nigel Krauth

- Author: Nigel Krauth
- Language: English
- Genre: Literary novel
- Publisher: Allen & Unwin
- Publication date: 1990
- Publication place: Australia
- Media type: Print
- Pages: 168 pp.
- Awards: 1991 New South Wales Premier's Literary Awards — Christina Stead Prize for Fiction, winner
- ISBN: 0044422830

JF Was Here is a 1990 novel by the Australian author Nigel Krauth.

It was the winner of the 1991 New South Wales Premier's Literary Awards, Christina Stead Prize for Fiction.

== Synopsis ==
John Freeman has led a reasonable life. Born to well-off parents, he easily traverses school and university, gets married – though this doesn't work out and it ends amicably – before realising that he is homosexual. He moves to Papua New Guinea to be with the love of his life, and then, at the age of 40, he discovers that he has AIDS. He also discovers that his beloved grandmother Ina carried a dark secret; she had done something appalling in PNG. So he sets out to find out what he can about her by re-visiting her old haunts at the Hydra Majestic in the Blue Mountains.

== Critical reception ==
In The Age Helen Elliott noted that author Krauth is "fascinated with the darker aspects of reality, of what lies behind our apparently ordinary lives. His writing brilliantly illuminates this dark beneath the sunlit surface." She concludes that "JF Was Here is a delicate, effortless and beautiful novel."

== Awards ==
- 1991 New South Wales Premier's Literary Awards, winner

== See also ==
- 1990 in Australian literature
