= Melanie Cheng =

Australian medical doctor and writer

Melanie Cheng is an Australian doctor and author of Australia Day (2017) and two novels, The Burrow (2024) and Room for a Stranger (2019). Cheng draws upon her biracial, Chinese-Australian heritage as well as her experience as a medical professional to inform her fictional work.

Australia Day is Cheng's debut fictional work. It is a collection of fourteen short stories exploring the multicultural nature of the Australian experience. It was the recipient of the 2018 Victorian Premier's Literary Award for Fiction. Her second book, Room for a Stranger, was published in 2019 and has received critical acclaim, including being longlisted for the 2020 Miles Franklin Literary Award. She was shortlisted for the 2018 Horne Prize for her essay, "All the Other Stories".

Cheng has also published numerous articles on her experiences in general practice to journalism outlets such as the ABC and SBS. She continues to write and practice medicine. She currently resides with her husband and two children in Melbourne, Australia.

== Early life and education ==
Cheng was born in Adelaide, Australia and moved to Hong Kong in 1986 wherein she attended an English-speaking school. She is of Chinese-Australian heritage and her biracial, Eurasian background has had a significant influence on her experience growing up as well as her writing practice.

She studied medicine at Melbourne Medical School and graduated in 2003. Thereafter, she interned and worked in hospitals, and volunteered with an Australian-based NGO in Cambodia, before making the decision to pursue general practice. While she wrote casually for personal leisure throughout her years of schooling, Cheng pursued the craft more seriously after attending a gathering of the Creative Doctors Network organisation in Sydney. There, she "met doctors who were also writers, actors, directors, photographers and musicians" who "encouraged and validated" her work. The practice of writing became "a compulsion, something [she] needed to do", which incited her to consult Writers Victoria, wherein she attended a short story course with tutor Emmett Stinson and expanded her network, including meeting her mentor Mark Smith.

== Career ==
=== Australia Day (2017) ===
Australia Day is a collection of fourteen short stories that was published in May 2017. The collection's title comes from the official Australian national public holiday, which occurs annually on 26 January and marks the anniversary of the 1788 arrival of the First Fleet of British ships at Port Jackson, New South Wales, and the raising of the Flag of Great Britain at Sydney Cove by Governor Arthur Phillip. Australia Day celebrations reflect the diverse society and landscape of the nation. In line with the Australian government's commitment to celebrating the nation's multicultural makeup, Cheng's collection comprises stories that explore the experiences of predominantly non-white Australians.

The stories are written in the realist tradition and are all focused on the experiences of its racially and culturally diverse characters. Particularly, the stories examine the characters' "flaws, failings and vulnerability ... as well as their grit and strength as they struggle with everyday challenges ... like trying to fit in, make friends, find love or cope with loss." The collection is preceded with an epigraph and subsequently book-ended by two stories that are set on Australia Day.

The epigraph is a statement made by the former Australian Prime Minister Malcolm Turnbull, wherein he stated that “there has never been a more exciting time to be an Australian.” It was the first public statement Turnbull made after assuming the incumbent Liberal National Party's leadership from Tony Abbott on September 14, 2015.

Australia Day won the 2016 Victorian Premier's Literary Award for an Unpublished Manuscript. Following its publication, the work was awarded the 2018 Victorian Premier's Literary Award for Fiction. The judges' report for Australia Day's award praised Cheng for her "inclusive portrait of contemporary Australia [as it] explores what it means to belong, to be Australia; its insight from different vantage points and its photo-realistic narrative make it an exciting and impressive debut."

=== Room for a Stranger (2019) ===
Cheng's first novel Room for a Stranger explores similar themes to her acclaimed short story collection, particularly those of belonging and interpersonal relationships. The novel has generally received positive reviews. However, there is some small criticism of the lack of character development in the novel. The novel alternates between the perspectives of Meg Hughes and Andy Chan.

Meg is a woman in her seventies who lives alone in a house in suburban Melbourne. Along with an increasingly acute feeling of loneliness, Meg grapples with the recent death of her sister and the hardships that come with aging. After a violent home invasion, Meg decides to participate in a homeshare program, where a student may exchange companionship and ten hours of housework for board and meals.

The student is Andy, who moves from Hong Kong to Melbourne for a year to study biomedicine. Along with adjusting to a new and unfamiliar environment, which is also at times quite hostile to foreigners, Andy also grapples with the pressure and turmoil of his family struggling back in Hong Kong. His mother has just been admitted to a psychiatric hospital and his father's cleaning business has failed.

The novel explores the unique relationship that forms between these two characters who, despite their ostensibly contrasting backgrounds, find that they share similar experiences and qualities. As the literary journalist and writer Helen Elliott observes in a review published in The Monthly, "Andy and Meg are both lonely and adrift, both trapped in restrictive identities and subject to prejudice and exclusion of different kinds. Each has a fragile sense of self and an innate timidity."

=== General practice ===
Cheng has written a number of articles relating to her experience as a general practitioner. She has written about the importance of choice with regards to pregnancies, stating that "when a pregnancy is unwanted it's almost always because the arrival of a baby would cause significant financial, emotional and psychological distress." She has also written a piece criticising the 2015 Australian Border Force Act, which "imposes a two-year prison sentence for any 'entrusted person' who makes a record of or discloses 'protected information'" such as the conditions they witness in immigration detention centres. She has also criticised the proposed copayment plan proposed by the Treasurer in the 2014 Federal Budget and its foreseeable detrimental impact on the Australian population, especially its vulnerable groups such as Indigenous Australians, the disabled and the aging.

=== The Burrow (2024) ===
Cheng's second novel was released by Text Publishing in 2024.

== Personal life ==
Cheng is based in Fitzroy, Melbourne. Her writing has appeared in SBS Online, Meanjin, Overland, Griffith Review and Peril. She cites Richard Yates, Alice Munro, Haruki Murakami and Christos Tsiolkas as her literary inspirations and influences.

== Awards ==
Before the publication of her first novel, Cheng was the runner up in the Deborah Cass Writing Prize in 2016 and won the Unpublished Manuscript award in the Victorian Premier's Literary Awards in the same year.

Australia Day won the 2018 Victorian Premier's Prize for Fiction, and Room for a Stranger was longlisted for the 2020 Miles Franklin Award.

She was shortlisted for the Victorian Premier's Prize for Fiction and longlisted for the Stella Prize, the Miles Franklin Award and the Voss Literary Prize in 2025 for The Burrow.

== Bibliography ==
- Australia Day (2017)
- Room for a Stranger (2019)
- The Burrow (2024)
