= Finola Moorhead =

Australian writer (b. 1947)

- Born: 1947 (age 78–79)
- Occupation: Novelist
- Writing career
- Notable awards: 1991 Victorian Premier's Prize for Fiction, winner

Finola Moorhead (born 1947) is an Australian novelist, playwright, essayist, poet, and reviewer. Her topics include women and writing, switching between reality and fiction, with themes of subversion and survival. Moorhead participates in the women's liberation movement, and during the 1980s, she was a radical feminist. As a result of a challenge she wrote a book without male characters.

== Childhood and education ==
Moorhead and her three siblings were brought up by her single mother. She went to boarding school before deciding to study law at the University of Melbourne. Moorhead then transferred to the University of Tasmania during the protests which were occurring over the Vietnam War. She graduated with a degree in arts.

== Early career ==
Moorhead was employed as a teacher before starting her professional writing career in 1973. She had begun writing the year before, after attending the Adelaide Writer's Festival and meeting the poet and campaigner Judith Wright and the writer Roger McKnight. Moorhead began writing for Meanjin, a literary journal, which also involved A.A Phillips and Clem Christesen at the time. Her work also appeared in periodicals and anthologies.

Moorhead has supported the women's liberation movement since the 1970s, and during the 1980s, she identified with radical feminism.

== Writings ==
She was a contemporary of the writer Christina Stead, who challenged Moorhead to write a book without male characters. As a result, Moorhead wrote her 1987 book Remember the Tarantella. The lesbian fictional novel has a lead character whose name begins with "I" and the other 25 female characters' names begin with a different letter of the alphabet.

Among her other works are the novels A Handwritten Modern Classic (1985), Quilt (1985), Still Murder (1991/2002), Darkness More Visible (2000) and the poetry collection My Voice (2006), and the plays Curtain Raiser, Horses and It Might As Well Be Loneliness. Remember the Tarantella has been described as dealing with loss and grief. She sent her first story and play off to The Herald Short Story Competition and The Australian National Playwright's Conference Competition, winning first prize for both. She was also a Victorian Premier's Prize for Fiction laureate in 1991.

== Selected works ==
- Horses : a play in two acts
- It might as well be loneliness : a short play
- To be congruous with the sea (1974)
- Squash (1974)
- A prose piece: of the rubbish tin outside federation cafe (1975)
- The illusive quality stories (1975)
- Another piece on Jillian Arbus (1976)
- Three pieces from 'Middle Class Novel' (1978)
- Still Murder (1990)
- Mother suffers the suspended sentence (1995)
- Reputation (1997)
- Darkness more visible (2000)
- Quilt : a collection of prose (2002)
- My voice (2006)
- A modern classic (2011)
- Remember the tarantella (1987)
- A handwritten modern classic (2012)
