= Mireille Juchau =

Australian author (born 1969)

- Born: 1969 (age 56–57); Sydney, New South Wales
- Citizenship: Australian and German
- Occupation: Writer
- Writing career
- Language: English
- Years active: 1995-
- Notable work: The World Without Us

Mireille Juchau (born 1969) is an Australian author.

== Early life and education ==
Juchau was born in 1969 and was raised in Sydney, New South Wales.

She received First Class Honours and the University Medal from the University of Technology, Sydney (UTS) in 1994 for her BA thesis, Tracings: Writing memory and the Holocaust. She completed a doctorate in writing and philosophy from the University of Western Sydney in 2000, with her thesis Machines for feeling: Narrating autistic experience.

== Career ==
Juchau was the fiction editor of HEAT magazine from 2009-2011.

She has been a peer on the Literature Board for the Australia Council for the Arts, a judge for the New South Wales Premier's Literary Awards and has lectured at University of Technology, Sydney, University of New South Wales, Macquarie University and Western Sydney University. She is an Honorary Affiliate at the Charles Perkins Centre, University of Sydney where she was Writer in Residence in 2017-2018.

== Recognition and awards ==
- 2000 - shortlisted The Australian/Vogel Literary Award for Machines for Feeling
- 2002 - winner, Perishable Theatre International Women's Playwriting Competition
- 2004 - awarded the Marten Bequest Travelling Scholarship
- 2008 - shortlisted The Age Book of the Year Awards — Fiction Prize for Burning In
- 2008 - highly commended Barbara Jefferis Award for Burning In
- 2008 - shortlisted Commonwealth Writers' Prize South East Asia and South Pacific Region — Best Book for Burning In
- 2008 - shortlisted Nita Kibble Literary Award for Burning In
- 2008 - shortlisted Prime Minister's Literary Awards — Fiction for Burning In
- 2015 - longlisted Notting Hill Editions International Essay Prize for The Most Holy Object in the House
- 2016 - shortlisted Australian Book Industry Awards (ABIA) — Australian Literary Fiction Book of the Year for The World Without Us
- 2016 - Longlisted International Dublin Literary Award for The World Without Us
- 2016 - longlisted Miles Franklin Award for The World Without Us
- 2016 - shortlisted New South Wales Premier's Literary Awards — Christina Stead Prize for Fiction for The World Without Us
- 2016 - shortlisted Stella Prize for The World Without Us
- 2016 - winner Victorian Premier's Literary Awards — The Vance Palmer Prize for Fiction for The World Without Us
- 2016 - shortlisted Voss Literary Prize for The World Without Us

She attended the New York State Summer Writer's School, USA in 2000 and has had writing residencies at the BR Whiting Studio Rome (2025), Varuna Writers Centre, Bundanon Arts Centre, Australia.

== Selected works ==
=== Novels ===
- Machines for Feeling (2001)
- Burning In (2007)
- The World Without Us (2015)

=== Drama ===
- White Gifts (2002)
