= South Australian Literary Awards =

Australian literary award

- Logo of the South Australian Literary Awards
- Awarded for: Excellence in Australian literature
- Sponsored by: CreateSA
- Location: Mortlock Chamber, Adelaide, South Australia
- Country: Australia
- Presented by: State Library of South Australia
- Formerly called: Adelaide Festival Awards for Literature (1986–2024)
- Rewards: Various prizes and fellowships
- First award: 1986; 40 years ago
- Website: stories.slsa.sa.gov.au

The South Australian Literary Awards, until 2024 known as the Adelaide Festival Awards for Literature, comprise a group of biennially-granted literary awards established in 1986 by the Government of South Australia. Formerly announced during Adelaide Writers' Week in March, as part of the Adelaide Festival, from 2024 the awards are announced in a dedicated ceremony in October. The awards include national as well as state-based prizes, and offer three fellowships for South Australian writers. Several categories have been added to the original four.

== History ==
The Adelaide Festival Awards for Literature were created by the Government of South Australia in 1986 and awarded during Writers' Week as part of the Adelaide Festival.

In 2020, the State Library of South Australia (SLSA) took over administration of the awards from Arts South Australia, and library director Geoff Strempel felt that the awards being presented in the late afternoon right at the end of a busy Writers' Week meant that they did not get the attention they deserved, especially compared with its interstate equivalents.

From 2024, the awards are renamed the South Australian Literary Awards (a name in line with its interstate equivalents), and the awards ceremony takes place in the Mortlock Chamber of the SLSA towards the end of the year, away from the festival season. The first of the rebranded awards takes place in October 2024. The shortlist was announced on 9 August 2024.

== Description ==
The Premier's Award is the richest prize, worth A$25,000, and awarded for the best overall published work which has already won an award in one of the other categories. There is a total prize pool of A$167,500, which is distributed 11 categories, including the Premier's Award. There are six national and five South Australian categories.

Other national awards, worth A$15,000 (equivalent to $16,853 in 2022) each as of 2024, are the Fiction Award, Children's Literature Award, Young Adult Fiction Award, John Bray Poetry Award, and the Non-Fiction Award. South Australian awards and fellowships are the Jill Blewett Playwright's Award, the Arts South Australia/Wakefield Press Unpublished Manuscript Award, the Barbara Hanrahan Fellowship, the Max Fatchen Fellowship (in honour of Adelaide author and journalist Max Fatchen), and the Tangkanungku Pintyanthi Aboriginal and Torres Strait Islander Fellowship. Applications for each year's awards are open until mid-December of the preceding year.

The awards are jointly funded by the SA government and the Libraries Board of South Australia.

== National awards ==
=== Premier's Award ===
Eileen Chong holding her award-winning book at the Meet the Winners of the 2026 National Published Book Awards event.

Year	Author	Title	Ref.
1996	Tim Flannery	The Future Eaters	
1998	Robert Drewe	The Drowner	
2000	Roger McDonald	Mr. Darwin's Shooter	
2002	Peter Carey	True History of the Kelly Gang	
2004	Dorothy Porter	Wild Surmise	
2006	Gail Jones	Sixty Lights	
2008	John Tranter	Urban Myths: 210 Poems	
2010	Shaun Tan	Tales from Outer Suburbia	
2012	Kim Scott	That Deadman Dance	
2014	Frank Moorhouse	Cold Light	
2016	Tamsin Janu	Figgy in the World	
2018	Eva Hornung	The Last Garden	
2020	Jessica Townsend	Nevermoor: The Trials of Morrigan Crow	
2022	Tara June Winch	The Yield	
2024	Shannon Burns	Childhood	
2026	Eileen Chong	We Speak of Flowers	

=== Fiction Award ===
Year	Author	Title	Ref.
1986	Helen Garner	The Children's Bach	
1988	Rod Jones	Julia Paradise	
1990	Peter Carey	Oscar and Lucinda	
1992	David Malouf	The Great World	
1994	Frank Moorhouse	Grand Days	
1996	Richard Flanagan	Death of a River Guide	
1998	Robert Drewe	The Drowner	
2000	Roger McDonald	Mr. Darwin's Shooter	
2002	Peter Carey	True History of the Kelly Gang	
2004	Kate Jennings	Moral Hazard	
2006	Gail Jones	Sixty Lights	
2008	Roger McDonald	The Ballad of Desmond Kale	
2010	David Malouf	Ransom	
2012	Kim Scott	That Deadman Dance	
2014	Frank Moorhouse	Cold Light	
2016	Rohan Wilson	To Name Those Lost	
2018	Eva Hornung	The Last Garden	
2020	Gail Jones	The Death of Noah Glass	
2022	Tara June Winch	The Yield	
2024	SJ Norman	Permafrost	
2026	Michelle de Kretser	Theory & Practice	

=== Children's Literature Award ===
Year	Author	Title	Ref.
1986	Ivan Southall	The Long Night Watch	
1988	Gillian Rubinstein	Space Demons	
1990	Gillian Rubinstein	Beyond the Labyrinth	
1992	Eleanor Nilsson	The House Guest	
1994	Gary Crew	Angel's Gate	
1996	John Marsden	The Third Day, the Frost	
1998	Robin Klein	The Listmaker	
2000	Phillip Gwynne	Deadly, Unna?	
2002	Garth Nix	Lirael	
2004	Ursula Dubosarsky	Abyssinia	
2006	Barry Jonsberg	It's Not All About You, Calma!	
2008	Michael Gerard Bauer	Don't Call Me Ishmael	
2010	Shaun Tan	Tales from Outer Suburbia	
2012	Rosanne Hawke	Taj and the Great Camel Trek	
2014	Catherine Jinks	A Very Unusual Pursuit	
2016	Tamsin Janu	Figgy in the World	
2018	Wendy Orr	Dragonfly Song	
2020	Jessica Townsend	Nevermoor: The Trials of Morrigan Crow	
2022	Katrina Nannestad	We Are Wolves	
2024	Tristan Bancks	Scar Town	
2026	Peter Carnavas	Leo and Ralph	

=== Young Adult Fiction Award ===
Year	Author	Title	Ref.
2012	Vikki Wakefield	All I Ever Wanted	
2014	Vikki Wakefield	Friday Brown	
2016	Darren Groth	Are You Seeing Me?	
2018	Justine Larbalestier	My Sister Rosa	
2020	Sarah Epstein	Small Spaces	
2022	Leanne Hall	The Gaps	
2024	Biffy James	Completely Normal (and Other Lies)	
2026	Sharon Kernot	Birdy	

=== John Bray Poetry Award ===
Honours John Jefferson Bray (1912–1995), Chief Justice of South Australia, academic and poet for his distinguished services to Australian poetry.

Year	Author	Title	Ref.
1986	Robert Gray	Selected Poems: 1963–1983	
1988	Les Murray	The Daylight Moon	
1990	Gwen Harwood	Bone Scan	
1992	Vincent Buckley	Last Poems	
1994	Andrew Lansdown	Between Glances	
1996	John Kinsella	The Silo: A Pastoral Symphony	
1998	Peter Boyle	The Blue Cloud of Crying	
2000	Dimitris Tsaloumas	The Harbour	
2002	Cath Kenneally	Around Here	
2004	Dorothy Porter	Wild Surmise	
2006	Luke Davies	Totem	
2008	John Tranter	Urban Myths: 210 Poems	
2010	Bronwyn Lea	The Other Way Out	
2012	Les Murray	Taller When Prone	
2014	Lisa Jacobson	The Sunlit Zone	
2016	Les Murray	Waiting for the Past	
2018	Pam Brown	Missing Up	
2020	Natalie Harkin	Archival-Poetics	
2022	Jordie Albiston	Fifteeners	
2024	Gavin Yuan Gao	At the Altar of Touch	
2026	Eileen Chong	We Speak of Flowers	

=== Non-Fiction Award ===
Year	Author	Title	Ref.
1986	R. M. Gibbs	A History of Prince Alfred College	
1988	Trevor Wilson	The Myriad Faces of War	
1990	John Bray	Satura	
1992	David Marr	Patrick White: A Life	
1994	Susan Maushart	Sort of a Place Like Home: Remembering the Moore River Native Settlement	
1996	Tim Flannery	The Future Eaters	
1998	David Day	Claiming a Continent: A History of Australia	
2000	Tim Flannery	Throwim Way Leg	
2000	Cassandra Pybus	The Devil and James McAuley	
2002	John Birmingham	Leviathan: The Unauthorised Biography of Sydney	
2004	Rebe Taylor	Unearthed: The Aboriginal Tasmanians of Kangaroo Island	
2006	Mandy Sayer	Velocity	
2008	Jacob Rosenberg	Sunrise West	
2010	Jill Roe	Stella Miles Franklin	
2012	Mark McKenna	An Eye for Eternity: The Life of Manning Clark	
2014	Kate Richards	Madness: A Memoir	
2016	Robert Dessaix	What Days Are For	
2018	Tim Winton	The Boy Behind the Curtain	
2020	Meredith Lake	The Bible in Australia	
2022	Helen Ennis	Olive Cotton: A Life in Photography	
2024	Shannon Burns	Childhood	
2026	Micaela Sahhar	Find Me at the Jaffa Gate: An Encyclopaedia of a Palestinian Family	

== South Australian awards & fellowships ==
=== Jill Blewett Playwright's Award ===
Year	Playwright	Title	Ref.
1992	Jimmy Chi	Bran Nue Dae	
1994	Melissa Reeves	Sweetown	
1996	Daniel Keene	Because You Are Mine	
1998	Hilary Bell	Wolf Lullaby	
2000	Andrew Bovell, Patricia Cornelius, Melissa Reeves and Christos Tsiolkas	Who's Afraid of the Working Class?	
2002	Josh Tyler	Small Faith	
2004	Sean Riley	Beautiful Words: A Trilogy	
2006	Finegan Kruckemeyer	This Uncharted Hour	
2008	Duncan Graham	Merger: Art, Life and the Other Thing	
2010	Nina Pearce	This Place	
2012	Nicki Bloom	A Cathedral	
2014	Phillip Kavanagh	Replay	
2016	Duncan Graham	Cut	
2016	Fleur Kilpatrick	Blessed	
2018	Emily Steel	19 Weeks	
2020	Piri Eddy	Forgiveness	
2022	Peter Beaglehole	Calendar Days	
2024	Melissa-Kelly Franklin	Paradise Lost	
2026	Jamie Hornsby	Python	

=== Arts SA/Wakefield Press Unpublished Manuscript Award ===
Year	Author	Manuscript title	Ref.
1998	Pearlie McNeill	Counting the Rivers	
2000	No winner		
2002	Corrie Hosking	The Black Dream	
2004	Stefan Laszczuk	Goddamn Bus of Happiness	
2006	Rachel Hennessy	The Quakers	
2008	Stephen Orr	The Second Fouling Mark	
2010	Amy T. Matthews	End of the Night Girl	
2012	Margaret Merrilees	The First Week	
2014	Cassie Flanagan-Willanski	Here Where We Live	
2016	Charlie Archbold	Mallee Boys	
2018	Annette Marner	A New Name for the Colour Blue	
2020	Jelena Dinić	In the Room with the She Wolf	
2022	Roanna McClelland	The Comforting Weight of Water	
2024	Lyn Dickens	Salt upon the Water	
2026	Lara Saunders	Wash Dirt. Burn Water	

=== Barbara Hanrahan Fellowship ===
Year	Recipient	Ref.
1994	Barry Westburg	
1996	Moya Costello	
1998	Cath Kenneally	
2000	Jan Owen	
2002	Graham Rowlands	
2004	Kirsty Brooks	
2006	Mike Ladd	
2008	Steve Evans	
2010	Patrick Allington	
2012	Nicki Bloom	
2014	Jennifer Mills	
2016	Carol Lefevre	
2018	Jude Aquilina	
2020	Aidan Coleman	
2022	Rachael Mead	
2024	Molly Murn	
2026	Aimee Knight	

=== Max Fatchen (formerly Carclew) Fellowship ===
(Carclew Fellowship 1988–2012; renamed Max Fatchen Fellowship from 2014, in honour of children's writer Max Fatchen, who died in 2012.)

Year	Recipient	Ref.
1988	Geoff Goodfellow	
1990	Anne-Marie Mykyta	
1992	Anne Brookman	
1994	Peter McFarlane	
1996	Chris Tugwell	
1998	Phil Cummings	
2000	Ian Bone	
2002	Ruth Starke	
2004	Marguerite Hann Syme	
2006	Christine Harris	
2008	Rosanne Hawke	
2010	Nicole Plüss	
2012	Janeen Brian	
2014	Helen Dinmore	
2016	Marianne Musgrove	
2018	Danielle Clode	
2020	Sally Heinrich	
2022	Poppy Nwosu	
2024	James A. Cooper	
2026	Kate Strutton	

=== Tangkanungku Pintyanthi Fellowship ===
Year	Recipient	Project	Ref.
2014	Ali Cobby Eckermann	Hopes Crossing	
2016	Ali Cobby Eckermann	Too Afraid to Cry	
2018	Edoardo Crismani	—	
2020	No applications received		
2022	K. A. Ren Wyld	Lovely's Valley	
2024	Alexis West	Monologues, Poems and Ramblings for You, Them, Us… and Me…	
2026	Dominic Guerrera	Pelican's Bill	

== Historic awards ==
=== Innovation award ===
Year	Author	Title	Ref.
2004	Ouyang Yu	The Eastern Slope Chronicle	
2006	M. T. C. Cronin	<More or Less> 1–100	
2008	John Hughes	Someone Else: Fictional Essays	
2010	Gerald Murnane	Barley Patch	

=== The Mayne Award for Multimedia ===
Year	Recipient(s)	Title	Ref.
1998	Julie Clarke, Rob Finlayson, Tom Gibson, Denise Higgins, Berni M. Janssen, Nazid Kimmie and Adrian Marshall	FlightPaths: Writing Journeys	
2000	Melinda Rackham	Carrier	
2002	Jayne Fenton Keane and David Keane	Poems in a Flash at The Stalking Tongue website	
2004	Geniwate	Concatenation	

== See also ==
- List of Australian literary awards
