= What I Have Written =

1996 film

- Film poster
- Directed by: John Hughes
- Written by: John A. Scott
- Produced by: John Hughes
- Starring: Martin Jacobs; Gillian Jones; Angie Milliken; Jacek Koman
- Cinematography: Dion Beebe
- Edited by: Uri Mizrahi
- Music by: John Phillips; David Bridie; Helen Mountford
- Release date: 11 July 1996
- Running time: 102 minutes
- Country: Australia
- Language: English
- Box office: A$182,064 (Australia)

What I Have Written is a 1996 Australian drama film directed by John Hughes and based on the novel by John A. Scott.

== Synopsis ==
Christopher Houghton's (Martin Jacobs) marriage to Sorel Atherton (Angie Milliken) is falling apart. While he is with Sorel in Paris, Christopher meets Francis Bourin (Gillian Jones) at a poetry reading, leading to a love affair between the pair. When Christopher and Sorel return to Melbourne, the secret relationship with Frances continues through an exchange of sexually explicit letters.

Christopher then suffers a stroke from which he does not recover. His friend and university colleague, Jeremy Fayrfax (Jacek Koman) sends the manuscript of a novella written by Christopher, to Sorel. When she reads it, she realises it documents the story of her husband's affair, and she embarks on a mission to uncover the truth behind it.

== Cast ==
- Martin Jacobs as Christopher Houghton / Avery
- Gillian Jones as Frances Bourin / Catherine
- Jacek Koman as Jeremy Fliszar
- Angie Milliken as Sorel Atherton / Gillian
- Margaret Cameron as Clare Murnane
- Nico Lathouris as Claude Murnane
- Fiona Stewart as Meredith
- Julie Forsyth as Dr. Williams
- Bronwen Gault as Duty Nurse
- Libby Stone as Departmental Secretary
- Ian Scott as Alan Gough
- Jillian Murray as Janet Gough
- Renai Caruso as Student

== Production ==
What I Have Written was produced by Early Works in association with the Australian Film Commission.

The film's writer and director John Hughes read an excerpt of John A. Scott’s 1994 novel in the Australian literary periodical Scripsi, and wanting to commission it as his next project, contacted the author. The pair worked together to develop an “expanded treatment", with Scott also adapting his own novel into the screenplay.

== Reception ==
=== Awards and nominations ===
Year	Award	Category	Result	Ref.
1996	AWGIE Awards	Best Feature Film – Adaptation	Won	
1996	Australian Film Institute Awards	Best Adapted Screenplay	Nominated	
1996	Australian Film Institute Awards	Best Achievement in Cinematography (Dion Beebe)	Nominated	
1996	Mystery Film Festival, Italy (Mystfest)	Best Film	Won	
1996	Stockholm International Film Festival	Bronze Horse Award	Nominated	
1996	Berlin International Film Festival	Golden Bear Award	Nominated	
1997	Film Critics Circle of Australia Awards	Best Cinematography (Dion Beebe)	Won	
1997	ARIA Music Awards of 1997	Best Original Soundtrack, Cast or Show Album	Nominated	

The film screened at numerous festivals and was selected for competition at the 46th Berlin International Film Festival and the Stockholm International Film Festival in 1996.

=== Reviews ===
David Stratton of At the Movies reviewed the film for Variety, saying: "Coolly intelligent, elliptical and ultimately satisfying, What I Have Written probes into delicate questions of marital infidelity and sexual obsession with wit and unusual honesty. Consummately acted and produced on an amazingly tight budget, the film, if carefully handled, could catch on with a sophisticated audience internationally."

Bernard Hemingway of Cinephilia.net.au wrote: "What I Have Written is an exceptional film in the annals of Australian cinema because of its "European" sensibility and analytical approach to the traditional narrative form of representation.”

Joshua Smith of OZ Cinema.com wrote: “John Hughes' first non-documentary feature is an intricate, mature, subversive mystery unlike anything seen before in Australian film. Its subjective, ambiguous nature and the multiple layers of reading make it a film that is challenging to even the most cinematically-literate audience.”

== See also ==
- Cinema of Australia
