= Nigel Krauth =

Australian novelist and academic (born 1949)

- Born: Nigel Krauth; 1949 (age 76–77); Cremorne, New South Wales, Australia
- Occupation: Novelist
- Writing career
- Notable awards: 1991 Christina Stead Prize, winner

Nigel Krauth (born 1949) is an Australian novelist and academic. In 2013 he was appointed a professor at Griffith University. He has published several novels and co-authored a number of young adult works.

== Early life and education ==
Krauth was born in Cremorne, New South Wales in 1949.

He studied at the University of Newcastle, NSW. He completed a research master's at the Australian National University in 1972 and received his PhD from the University of Queensland in 1983.

== Academic career ==
He taught at the University of Papua New Guinea, Mitchell CAE (now Charles Sturt University), and Southern Cross University, before his appointment at the Gold Coast CAE (now Griffith University). He retired as professor in the School of Humanities, Languages and Social Science at Griffith in 2024.

== Writing career ==
Krauth has edited several books and a scholarly journal, TEXT: Journal of Writing and Writing Courses which he co-founded with Tess Brady. He is currently publisher at Fragments Press and The Pieces Press.

== Recognition and awards ==
Krauth has won several awards, including the Vogel Award (co-winner, 1982) for Matilda My Darling (pre-publication title: The Jolly Swagman Affair) and the Christina Stead Prize (1991) for JF Was Here. Krauth has also judged several book awards including the "Best Fiction Book, Queensland Premier's Literary Awards" (2002-2013) and the "Josephine Ulrick Literature Prize" (which he managed 2004-2017). Besides long fiction he has written stories, plays, reviews and essays.

Brisbane's Albert Street Literary Trail features a plaque recording his novel, Matilda, My Darling (corner of Albert and Elizabeth Streets).

== Books ==
- Matilda, My Darling, Allen & Unwin, 1983, ISBN 0-86861-458-0
- The Bathing-Machine Called the Twentieth Century, Allen & Unwin, 1988, ISBN 0-04-320221-7
- JF Was Here, Allen & Unwin, 1992, ISBN 0-04-442283-0
- Freedom Highway, Allen & Unwin, 1999, ISBN 1-86448-989-8
- Creative Writing and the Radical, Multilingual Matters, 2016, ISBN 978-1783095926
- The Creative Writer’s Mind, Multilingual Matters, 2022, ISBN 978-1800415355
- Island Horizon, Fragments Press, 2024, ISBN 978-0-6459959-1-6
- Sir Clifford and Connie Reid, Fragments Press, 2026, ISBN 978-0-6459959-7-8
