= Carrie Tiffany =

English-born Australian novelist and former park ranger

- Born: 1965 (age 60–61); Halifax, England
- Occupation: Writer

Carrie Tiffany is an English-born Australian novelist and former park ranger.

== Biography ==
Tiffany was born in Halifax, West Yorkshire and migrated to Australia with her family in the early 1970s. She grew up in Perth, Western Australia. In her early twenties she worked as a park ranger in Central Australia.

She moved to Victoria to work as a forest ranger in the Central Highlands and later began working as a writer, focusing mainly on sustainable agriculture and the environment. Tiffany became the editor of Victorian Landcare Magazine in 1996. Tiffany took up writing fiction and completed a master's degree in Creative Writing at RMIT University and a doctorate at Deakin University. Tiffany mentors writers through the Australian Writer Mentors program and has taught writing at many institutions including RMIT University, University of Melbourne, Writers Victoria and the Banff Centre for Arts and Creativity. She teaches the online writing a novel program at Faber Writing Academy.

Tiffany's debut novel, Everyman's Rules for Scientific Living, was a remarkable success on its release in 2005, winning several awards and shortlisted for some major awards, including the Miles Franklin Award and the Orange Prize.

Her second novel, Mateship with Birds, was published in 2012 and won the inaugural Stella Prize. Her third novel, Exploded View, was published in 2019 to critical acclaim. Her Mildura community sound art project regenerating John Shaw Neilson’s 1905 poem, ‘The Loving Tree’ featured on ABC Radio National in 2017. Her fourth fiction book is the novella, The Lady with the Dog, about a woman with dementia filtered through her dog and based on her mother's experience. The book features illustrations by the visual artist Noel McKenna and was inspired after she re-read short story of the same name by Anton Chekov.

Tiffany was a member of the 2008 bid committee that secured Melbourne as UNESCO’s second City of Literature. In 2023 she served as a Digital Lending Rights Ambassador during the Australian Society of Authors successful campaign to have the Federal Government recognise the income Australian authors lose through loans and other free uses of their e-books in public lending libraries. She is a lecturer in English and Creative Writing at the La Trobe University.

== Awards and nominations ==
Awards and Nominations
Year	Name of Work	Prize	Prize Category	Result	Ref
2003	Everyman's Rules for Scientific Living	Victorian Premier's Literary Award	Unpublished Manuscript	Won	
2005	Everyman's Rules for Scientific Living	WA Premier's Book Award	Fiction	Won	
2006	Everyman's Rules for Scientific Living	Guardian First Book Award	—	Shortlisted	
2006	Everyman's Rules for Scientific Living	Miles Franklin Award	—	Shortlisted	
2006	Everyman's Rules for Scientific Living	Victorian Premier's Literary Award	Fiction	Shortlisted	
2007	Everyman's Rules for Scientific Living	International Dublin Literary Award		Longlisted	
2007	Everyman's Rules for Scientific Living	Nita Kibble Literary Awards	Dobbie Encouragement Award	Won	—
2007	Everyman's Rules for Scientific Living	Orange Prize for Fiction	—	Shortlisted	
2012	Mateship with Birds	Melbourne Prize for Literature	Best Writing Award	Shortlisted	—
2012	Mateship with Birds	Victorian Premier's Literary Award	Fiction	Shortlisted	—
2013	Mateship with Birds	Miles Franklin Award	—	Shortlisted	—
2013	Mateship with Birds	NSW Premier's Literary Awards	Christina Stead Prize for Fiction	Won	—
2013	Mateship with Birds	Stella Prize	—	Won	—
2013	Mateship with Birds	Women's Prize for Fiction	—	Shortlisted	—
2014	Mateship with Birds	International Dublin Literary		Longlisted	
2019	Exploded View	University of Queensland Fiction Book Award	—	Won	
2020	Exploded View	ALS Gold Medal	—	Shortlisted	
2020	Exploded View	Miles Franklin Award	—	Shortlisted	
2020	Exploded View	Voss Literary Prize	—	Shortlisted	
2024	"Seven snakes"	Melbourne Prize for Literature	Writers Prize	Won	

== Bibliography ==
- Everyman's Rules for Scientific Living, Pan Macmillan, 2005
- Mateship with Birds, Pan Macmillan, 2012
- Exploded View, Text Publishing, 2019
- The Lady with the Dog, NewSouth Books, 2026
