= Sixty Lights =

2004 novel by Gail Jones

- First edition
- Author: Gail Jones
- Language: English
- Genre: Novel
- Publisher: Harvill Press, London
- Publication date: 2004
- Publication place: Australia
- Media type: Print (Paperback)
- Pages: 249 pp
- ISBN: 1-84343-196-3
- OCLC: 56657798
- Dewey Decimal: 823.9'14 22
- LC Class: PR9619.3.J6863 S59 2004
- Preceded by: Black Mirror
- Followed by: Dreams of Speaking

Sixty Lights is a 2004 novel by Australian author Gail Jones.

== Themes ==
The novel explores the themes of the family relationships, marriage, death and loss.

The novel also explore deeper themes of an individuals inner mindscape, femininity, and the power of language.

== Dedication ==
"For my brothers, Peter and Kevin Jones."

== Awards ==
- Booker Prize, 2004: longlisted
- Western Australian Premier's Book Awards, Fiction, 2004: winner
- Western Australian Premier's Book Awards, Premier's Prize, 2004: winner
- Commonwealth Writers Prize, South East Asia and South Pacific Region, Best Book, 2005: commended
- Miles Franklin Literary Award, 2005: shortlisted
- New South Wales Premier's Literary Awards, Christina Stead Prize for Fiction, 2005: shortlisted
- Australian Literature Society Gold Medal, 2005
- The Age Book of the Year Award, Fiction Prize, 2005: winner
- Victorian Premier's Literary Award, The Vance Palmer Prize for Fiction, 2005: shortlisted
- South Australia Premier's Awards Fiction, 2006: winner
- South Australia Premier's Awards Best Overall Published Work, 2006: winner
- International Dublin Literary Award, 2006: longlisted

== Notes ==
- This novel was translated for Dutch, Polish, Portuguese, Spanish and German editions.

== Reviews ==
- "Sixty Lights". The Age. 21 August 2004.
- "The Asian Review of Books"
- "Australian Book Review"
- "The Guardian"
