= Mark Henshaw =

Australian novelist

Mark Henshaw (born 1951) is an Australian writer. He is best known for this 1988 post-modern novel Out of the Line of Fire which was shortlisted for the Miles Franklin Award and The Age Book of the Year Award.

== Works ==
As himself

- Out of the Line of Fire (Penguin, 1988)
- The Snow Kimono (Text Publishing, 2014)

As J. M. Calder (co-written with John Clanchy)

- If God Sleeps (Penguin, 1997)
- And Hope to Die (2007)

== Personal life ==
Henshaw was born in Canberra, Australia in 1951. He grew up in a Catholic family, his father an RAAF engineer and subsequently a cartographer. He commenced studying medicine and music before attaining a double-honours degree in English and German. He worked at one time as curator of international prints at the National Gallery of Australia, having once been a tour guide there.
