= Five Bells (novel) =

Book by Gail Jones

- First edition
- Author: Gail Jones
- Language: English
- Genre: Novel
- Publisher: Vintage, Australia
- Publication date: 2011
- Publication place: Australia
- Media type: Print (Paperback)
- Pages: 216
- ISBN: 9781864710601
- Preceded by: Sorry
- Followed by: A Guide to Berlin

Five Bells (2011) is a novel by Australian author Gail Jones.

== Plot summary ==
Five Bells concerns four main characters who visit Circular Quay in Sydney on the same day: Ellie, a PhD student; James, a teacher; Catherine, an Irish woman mourning the loss of her brother; and Pei Xing, a Chinese woman.

== See also ==
- 2011 in Australian literature

== Notes ==
- Epigraph: "Memory believes before knowing remembers." - William Faulkner, Light in August

Where have you gone? The tide is over you,
The turn of midnight water's over you,
As Time is over you, and mystery,
And memory, the flood that does not flow.
–Kenneth Slessor, "Five Bells"

- "The first debt of this project is to Kenneth Slessor's elegiac poem, "Five Bells" (1939), which returned to me, like a remembered song, one midnight on a ferry in the centre of Circular Quay". (Author's acknowledgements: p. 217)

== Reviews ==
- Australian Book Review
- The Sydney Morning Herald

== Awards and nominations ==
- 2012 shortlisted Indie Book Awards Book of the Year – Fiction
- 2012 shortlisted Festival Awards for Literature (SA) – Award for Fiction
- 2012 shortlisted ASAL Awards – ALS Gold Medal
- 2012 shortlisted Barbara Jefferis Award
- 2012 winner Nita Kibble Literary Award
- 2013 longlisted International Dublin Literary Award
