= Everyman's Rules for Scientific Living =

Book by Carrie Tiffany

- First edition
- Author: Carrie Tiffany
- Language: English
- Genre: Literary
- Publisher: Pan Macmillan, Australia
- Publication date: 2005
- Publication place: Australia
- Media type: Print (Paperback)
- Pages: 256 pp
- ISBN: 0330421913
- Followed by: Mateship with Birds

Everyman's Rules for Scientific Living is a 2005 novel by Australian author Carrie Tiffany. It won the 2005 Western Australian Premier's Book Award for Fiction, and was shortlisted for the 2006 Miles Franklin Award and the 2007 Orange Prize for Fiction.

== Description ==
The novel follows Jean Finnegan, a sensible and appealing young seamstress who, when the story opens in 1934, has earned a billet in the women's car at the rear of the Better Farming Train that tours Victoria, bringing agricultural science to the man-on-the-land. The rest of the train consists of 14 cars, each dedicated to some aspect of farm labour – a pig car, a cattle car, a sheep car, a wheat car, even a chicken-sexing car run by world-famous Japanese chicken-sexer Mr Ohno, whose admiration manages to unsettle Jean despite his almost non-existent English.

== Awards ==
- 2003 won the Victorian Premier's Literary Award for an unpublished manuscript
- 2005 won the Western Australian Premier's Book Award for Fiction
- 2006 shortlisted for the Guardian First Book Award
- 2006 shortlisted for the Miles Franklin Award
- 2006 shortlisted for the Victorian Premier's Literary Award – Vance Palmer Prize for Fiction
- 2007 winner of the Dobbie Encouragement Award
- 2007 shortlisted for the Orange Prize for Fiction
- 2007 longlisted for the International Dublin Literary Award

== Notes ==
The novel carried the following dedication:

For T. P. S., T. E. S. & G. R. T. and with heartfelt thanks to K. J. S.

== Reviews ==
- The Age: "..a highly accomplished, adroit and funny-serious novel, which, unlike a Mallee farm, works almost perfectly."
- Blogcritics: "..all of Australia’s 20th-century history is here – the struggle to find a workable relationship with an ancient continent, to come to terms with its place in Asia, two world wars, the Depression, stories that are indeed not just Australian, but universal."
