= Christina Stead Prize for Fiction =

Fiction award in New South Wales, Australia

The New South Wales Premier's Literary Awards, also known as the NSW Premier's Literary Awards, were first awarded in 1979. They are among the richest literary awards in Australia. Notable prizes include the Christina Stead Prize for Fiction, the Kenneth Slessor Prize for Poetry, and the Douglas Stewart Prize for Non-Fiction.

The Christina Stead Prize for Fiction is awarded for a work of fiction that may be either a novel or a collection of stories. The recipient receives a A$40,000 prize. It is named in honour of Christina Stead, an Australian novelist and short-story writer. The first recipient was David Malouf, who was awarded the Prize for his novella An Imaginary Life in 1979. In 2019 Michelle de Kretser won with The Life to Come and equalled Peter Carey's record of three wins.

The award was not presented in 1998 as the eligibility dates were amended.

== Winners and shortlists ==
=== 2020— ===
Year	Title	Author	Publisher	Result
2026	The Immigrants	Moreno Giovannoni	Black Inc.	Winner
2026	Cure	Katherine Brabon	Ultimo	Shortlist
2026	Arborescence	Rhett David	Hachette	Shortlist
2026	The Passenger Seat	Vijay Khurana	Ultimo	Shortlist
2026	Rapture	Emily Maguire	Allen & Unwin	Shortlist
2026	Elegy, Southwest	Madeleine Watts	Ultimo	Shortlist
2025	Highway 13	Fiona McFarlane	Allen & Unwin	Winner
2025	One Another	Gail Jones	Text Publishing	Shortlist
2025	Heartsease	Kate Kruimink	Picador	Shortlist
2025	Edenglassie	Melissa Lucashenko	University of Queensland Press	Shortlist
2025	Days of Innocence and Wonder	Lucy Treloar	Picador	Shortlist
2025	The In-Between	Christos Tsiolkas	Allen & Unwin	Shortlist
2024	The Sitter	Angela O'Keeffe	University of Queensland Press	Winner
2024	The Sun Walks Down	Fiona McFarlane	Allen & Unwin	Shortlist
2024	Prima Facie	Suzie Miller	Picador	Shortlist
2024	Shirley	Ronnie Scott	Hamish Hamilton	Shortlist
2024	The Crying Room	Gretchen Shirm	Transit Lounge	Shortlist
2024	Praiseworthy	Alexis Wright	Giramondo	Shortlist
2023	Women I Know	Katerina Gibson	Scribner	Winner
2023	Cold Enough for Snow	Jessica Au	Giramondo	Shortlist
2023	Every Version of You	Grace Chan	Affirm	Shortlist
2023	Women I Know	Katerina Gibson	Scribner	Shortlist
2023	Bad Art Mother	Edwina Preston	Wakefield	Shortlist
2022	Dark as Last Night	Tony Birch	University of Queensland Press	Winner
2022	The Kindness of Birds	Merlinda Bobis	Spinifex	Shortlist
2022	The Shut Ins	Katherine Brabon	Allen & Unwin	Shortlist
2022	The Dogs	John Hughes	Upswell	Shortlist
2022	Pushing Back	John Kinsella	Transit Lounge	Shortlist
2022	The Performance	Claire Thomas	Hachette	Shortlist
2021	A Room Made of Leaves	Kate Grenville	Text Publishing	Winner
2021	Murmurations	Carol Lefevre	Spinifex	Shortlist
2021	Cherry Beach	Laura McPhee-Browne	Text	Shortlist
2021	The Dictionary of Lost Words	Pip Williams	Affirm	Shortlist
2021	The Weekend	Charlotte Wood	Allen & Unwin	Shortlist
2021	The Bass Rock	Evie Wyld	Vintage	Shortlist
2020	The Yield	Tara June Winch	Penguin Random House	Winner
2020	The White Girl	Tony Birch	University of Queensland Press	Shortlist
2020	The Palace of Angels	Mohammed Massoud Morsi	Wild Dingo Press	Shortlist
2020	The Electric Hotel	Dominic Smith	Allen & Unwin	Shortlist
2020	Exploded View	Carrie Tiffany	Text	Shortlist
2020	Wolfe Island	Lucy Treloar	Picador	Shortlist

=== 2010—2019 ===
Year	Title	Author	Publisher	Result
2019	The Life to Come	Michelle de Kretser	Allen & Unwin	Winner
2018	The Book of Dirt	Bram Presser	Text Publishing	Winner
2017	The Museum of Modern Love	Heather Rose	Allen & Unwin	Winner
2016	Locust Girl: A Lovesong	Merlinda Bobis	Spinifex Press	Winner
2015	The Snow Kimono	Mark Henshaw	Text Publishing	Winner
2014	Questions of Travel	Michelle de Kretser	Allen & Unwin	Winner
2013	Mateship with Birds	Carrie Tiffany	Pan Macmillan Australia	Winner
2012	That Deadman Dance	Kim Scott	Pan Macmillan Australia	Winner
2011	Lovesong	Alex Miller	Allen & Unwin	Winner
2010	Summertime	J. M. Coetzee	Harvill Secker	Winner

=== 2000—2009 ===
Year	Title	Author	Publisher	Result
2009	The Good Parents	Joan London	Vintage Books	Winner
2008	The Lost Dog	Michelle de Kretser	Allen & Unwin	Winner
2007	Theft: A Love Story	Peter Carey	Random House Australia	Winner
2006	The Secret River	Kate Grenville	Text Publishing	Winner
2005	The Turning	Tim Winton	Pan Macmillan Australia	Winner
2004	Shanghai Dancing	Brian Castro	Giramondo Publishing	Winner
2003	Moral Hazard	Kate Jennings	Picador	Winner
2002	Dirt Music	Tim Winton	Pan Macmillan Australia	Winner
2001	Conditions of Faith	Alex Miller	Allen & Unwin	Winner
2000	The Salt of Broken Tears	Michael Meehan	Vintage Books/Random House Australia	Winner

=== 1990—1999 ===
Year	Title	Author	Publisher	Result
1999	Mr Darwin's Shooter	Roger McDonald	Random House Australia	Winner
1998	No award			
1997	The Drowner	Robert Drewe	Pan Macmillan Australia	Winner
1997	The Multiple Effects of Rainshadow	Thea Astley	Viking Press	Shortlist
1997	The Beholder	Julian Davies	Penguin	Shortlist
1997	Night Letters	Robert Dessaix	Pan Macmillan Australia	Shortlist
1997	Solitude of Illusions	Adib Khan	Allen and Unwin	Shortlist
1997	Revelations of a Spanish Infanta	Sallie Muirden	HarperCollins	Shortlist
1996	Leaning Towards Infinity	Sue Woolfe	Random House Australia	Winner
1995	Just Like That	Lily Brett	Pan Macmillan	Winner
1994	Seasonal Adjustments	Adib Khan	Allen & Unwin	Winner
1993	Remembering Babylon	David Malouf	Random House Australia	Winner
1992	The Death of Napoleon	Simon Leys	Allen & Unwin	Winner
1991	JF Was Here	Nigel Krauth	Allen & Unwin	Winner
1990	Reaching Tin River	Thea Astley	William Heinemann Australia	Winner

=== 1979—1989 ===
Year	Title	Author	Publisher	Result
1989	Broken Words	Helen Hodgman	Penguin Books Australia	Winner
1988	Final Things	John Sligo	Penguin Books Australia	Winner
1987	Dancing on Coral	Glenda Adams	Angus & Robertson	Winner
1986	Postcards from Surfers	Helen Garner	McPhee Gribble	Winner
1985	Milk and Honey	Elizabeth Jolley	Fremantle Arts Centre Press	Winner
1984	Milk	Beverley Farmer	McPhee Gribble	Winner
1983	The Cure	Peter Kocan	Angus & Robertson	Winner
1982	Bliss	Peter Carey	University of Queensland Press	Winner
1981	The Impersonators	Jessica Anderson	Macmillan	Winner
1980	War Crimes	Peter Carey	University of Queensland Press	Winner
1979	An Imaginary Life	David Malouf	Chatto and Windus, London	Winner

== See also ==
- Australian literature
- List of years in literature
