= Every Move You Make =

Every Move You Make may refer to:

- Every Move You Make (TV series), a 2010 Hong Kong police procedural television series
- Every Move You Make (collection), a 2006 short story collection by David Malouf
- Every Move You Make: The Studio Recordings, a 2018 box set by The Police

== See also ==
- Every Breath You Take (disambiguation)
- Every Step You Take (disambiguation)
