= 1935 in Australian literature =

This article presents a list of the historical events and publications of Australian literature during 1935.

== Books ==
- Winifred Birkett – Earth's Quality
- Martin Boyd – The Lemon Farm
- Jean Devanny
  - The Ghost Wife
  - The Virtuous Courtesan
- Arthur Gask – The Poisoned Goblet
- Jack Lindsay – Last Days with Cleopatra
- Jack McLaren – The Devil of the Depths
- T. Inglis Moore – The Half-Way Sun : A Tale of the Philippine Islands
- Ambrose Pratt – Lift Up Your Eyes
- Alice Grant Rosman – The Sleeping Child
- Kylie Tennant – Tiburon
- F. J. Thwaites
  - The Mad Doctor
  - The Melody Lingers
- E. V. Timms – Far Caravan

== Children's ==
- Mary Grant Bruce – Wings Above the Billabong
- Jack Lindsay – Runaway
- P. L. Travers – Mary Poppins Comes Back
- Dorothy Wall – Brownie: The Story of a Naughty Little Rabbit

== Poetry ==
- C. J. Dennis
  - The Singing Garden
  - "Unconsidered Trifles"
- Mary Gilmore – "The Wanderer"
- Patrick White – The Ploughman and Other Poems
- Douglas Stewart – "Mending the Bridge"

== Drama ==
=== Radio ===
- John Pickard – For the Term of His Natural Life

=== Theatre ===
- Dymphna Cusack
  - Anniversary
  - Red Sky at Morning : A Play in Three Acts
- Dulcie Deamer – Revaluation
- Henry C. James– The Golden Gander
- Katharine Susannah Prichard – Forward One

== Awards and honours ==
=== Literary ===
Award	Author	Title	Publisher
ALS Gold Medal	Winifred Birkett	Earth's Quality	Angus and Robertson

== Births ==
A list, ordered by date of birth (and, if the date is either unspecified or repeated, ordered alphabetically by surname) of births in 1935 of Australian literary figures, authors of written works or literature-related individuals follows, including year of death.

- 21 March – Thomas Shapcott, novelist and poet
- 21 July – Syd Harrex, poet and academic (died 2015)
- 7 October – Thomas Keneally, novelist
- 18 November – Rodney Hall, novelist (born in England)
- 27 November – Marshall Browne, novelist (died 2014)
- 28 November – Randolph Stow, novelist (died 2010 in England)

== Deaths ==
A list, ordered by date of death (and, if the date is either unspecified or repeated, ordered alphabetically by surname) of deaths in 1935 of Australian literary figures, authors of written works or literature-related individuals follows, including year of birth.

- 22 February – Frederick Manning, novelist and poet (born 1882)
- 18 March – Mabel Forrest, poet and short story writer (born 1872)
- 10 April – Rosa Praed, novelist (born 1851)
- 6 September — John Bede Dalley, journalist and novelist (born 1876)
- 23 September – Louis Stone, novelist (born 1871)
- 11 October – Steele Rudd, short story writer (born 1868)
- 23 November – Louise Mack, novelist and poet (born 1870)

== See also ==
- 1935 in Australia
- 1935 in literature
- 1935 in poetry
- List of years in Australian literature
- List of years in literature
