= The Great World =

Novel by Australian author David Malouf

- First edition
- Author: David Malouf
- Language: English
- Publisher: Chatto & Windus (UK)
- Publication date: 1990
- Publication place: Australia
- Media type: Paperback
- Pages: 332 pp
- ISBN: 0-7011-3415-1
- OCLC: 22953897
- Dewey Decimal: 823 20
- LC Class: PR9619.3.M265 G74 1990
- Preceded by: Harland's Half Acre
- Followed by: Remembering Babylon

The Great World is a 1990 Miles Franklin literary award-winning novel by the Australian author David Malouf.

== Synopsis ==
It is an epic novel telling the story of two Australians during the turmoil of World War I; and their imprisonment by the Japanese during World War II.

== Critical reception ==
Marion Halligan in The Canberra Times noted that a "paradox that runs through the novel is the idea of weight, and of lightness. The weight of gravity that keeps you in place and makes you belong, the weight of responsibility, of experience as a load of ballast taken on, the mysterious lightness of an unborn baby that seems to offer his mother her true weight in the world, or the premonition of death that combines bird-like flight with the plummeting of a stone."

== Awards ==
- Adelaide Festival Awards for Literature, National Fiction Award, 1992: winner
- Prix Femina étranger (France), Best Foreign Novel, 1991: winner
- Miles Franklin Literary Award, 1991: winner
- Commonwealth Writers Prize, Overall Best Book Award, 1991: winner
- Commonwealth Writers Prize, South-East Asia and South Pacific Region, Best Book from the Region Award, 1991: winner
- National Library of Australia National Audio Book-of-the-Year Award, 1990: joint winner
