= The Conversations at Curlow Creek =

1996 novel by David Malouf

- First edition
- Author: David Malouf
- Language: English
- Publisher: Chatto and Windus, London, England
- Publication date: 1996
- Publication place: Australia
- Media type: Print (hardback & paperback)
- Pages: 214 pp
- ISBN: 0701165715
- OCLC: 35721093
- Preceded by: Remembering Babylon

The Conversations at Curlow Creek is a historical novel written by the prominent Australian author David Malouf. It was first published in 1996 by the Random House publishing group.

== Plot summary ==
The story takes place in 1827 on an isolated farm at the fictional locality of Curlow Creek in the mountains of the colony of New South Wales. The two main characters are Michael Adair, an Irish-born officer in the colonial mounted troopers, and Daniel Carney, an Irish escapee and bushranger. Adair had been dispatched from Sydney to oversee Carney's hanging and he arrives at Carney's temporary prison—a stockman's hut—on the night before he is due to be executed.

The narrative details conversations held by Adair and Carney throughout the cold night as they explore their shared Irish heritage. The novel is also peppered with Adair's reminiscences of his aristocratic childhood in County Galway. As the plot progresses, Adair develops sympathy for Carney despite his criminal past and impoverished background. The novel ends with Adair presumed to have let Carney escape into the bush—though as with many of David Malouf's novels, the ending is ambiguous and the reader does not know for sure the fate of the hero.

== Critical reception ==
In The Sydney Morning Herald Andrew Reimer called this a "powerful novel" that was an "exploration of the unrelenting conditions of life in Australia."

Chris Wallace-Crabbe in The Age commented that "nobody will unravel all the book's implicated lines of force on a first reading." He went on to conclude that what "we see in it are not moments of violence but the fibrous stands of conflict and reflection. And moments of luminous epiphany, moments which Malouf's prose is uniquely equipped to deliver."

== Notes ==
- Dedication: "To Peter Straus."
- Helen Daniel interviewed the author about the novel for Australian Humanities Review.

== Awards ==
- The Age Book of the Year Award, Fiction Prize, 1996: shortlisted
- Miles Franklin Award 1997: shortlisted
