= Fly Away Peter =

Novel by David Malouf

- First UK edition
- Author: David Malouf
- Language: English
- Publisher: George Braziller (US); Chatto & Windus (UK)
- Publication date: 1982
- Publication place: Australia
- Media type: Print (Hardback & Paperback)
- Pages: 134 pp
- ISBN: 0-7011-2625-6
- Preceded by: An Imaginary Life
- Followed by: Harland's Half Acre

Fly Away Peter is a 1982 novel by Australian author David Malouf. It won The Age Book of the Year award in 1982, and is often studied at senior level in Australian high schools. It was published in the U.S.A. as The Bread of Time to Come.

== Plot summary ==
Fly Away Peter is an Australian novel set before and during the First World War. The first part of the novel is set on the Queensland Gold Coast, and the second part on the Western Front.

The central character of the novel is Jim Saddler, a self-contained young man with a profound understanding of the bird life of an estuary near his home. Ashley Crowther has recently inherited the farm which includes the estuary; despite the divide of class and experience, the two young men form a close bond when Ashley offers Jim a job as a warden, recording the comings and goings of birds in their 'sanctuary'. Jim also befriends Imogen, an older woman whose photography captures the beauty of the birds in the sanctuary; in particular the Sandpiper. This is an idyllic world of Sandpipers, plovers and ibises, but not without the seeds of change and disturbance.

When the First World War breaks out, Jim feels obliged to join up, and travels to the Western Front, where his unique and sensitive perception gives the reader a window to the horrific experience of trench warfare. Malouf's description of the all-consuming 'system' of war and the gruesome realities of living and dying at the front are gut-wrenching in their detail. After an uneventful arrival at the front, a shell lands unexpectedly among Jim's friends behind the lines. Jim is coated by the blood of his friend Clancy, who is blown out of existence. Subsequently a young recruit Eric loses both legs.

Jim sees many other friends die. He crosses paths with Ashley, who is an officer in a different division. He confronts his own sense of violence when assaulted by another man whom Jim becomes enemies with, Wizzer, who later dies in a shell-hole. He also sees the local farming communities trying to keep making their livelihood amid the mayhem, including an old man planting in the dirt of a blasted wood. Jim begins again to make a record of the crows as their barely interrupted migration patterns continue above the front.

At the end of the novel, the reader enter Jim's subjectivity as he goes 'over the top' in an attack, is wounded and dies of his wounds. His exact point of death is not made explicit; his journey out of life is dream-like and poetic.

On the Queensland coast, Imogen grieves Jim's death and reflects on the meaningless of life and its beautiful continuity.

== Discussion ==
Fly Away Peter is considered to be an important work in Australian literature, and is on the Senior English curriculum in some states.

The novel touches on a range of themes which are common in explorations of Australian identity. Its setting in the First World War draws our attention to the ANZAC legend, and gives us a sense of the experience of the men who forged that legend. The relationship with land is explored; Jim feels he belongs to the land as much as Ashley, who owns it; Ashley accepts this with good humour. The boundaries of class and experience are palpable - Jim has grown up with a hardworking but violent and resentful widower father, and Ashley has had a privileged schooling in Europe - but they have a quiet rapport which transcends their differences.

The central motif of birds gives the author the opportunity to explore a range of themes. The miracle of bird migration becomes symbolic, echoing Jim's journey across the globe to the war. The notion of the 'bird's eye view' is explored. Like a migratory bird, Jim holds a 'map' of the swampland in his mind, whilst also seeing the detail of grass, undergrowth and water. A flight in Ashley's biplane gives him a view of the landscape which confirms his mental map. Later, in the trenches, he seems to go out of himself and see the battle as a map - while he is present in the mud and heat of battle, part of his perception observes, detached, from above.

Time - and the meaning of how we exist in time - is also a key theme in the novel. Imogen's comment that "A life isn't for anything; it simply is" is reinforced throughout. Her photographs of birds capture them in time, and give them a permanence they do not have in nature. The skeleton of a woolly mammoth, which rotted where it was killed with flints by early humans, lies where it fell and is unearthed as the trenches are dug. In this context the seemingly all-consuming 'machine' of war becomes merely a blip. As Imogen watches a surfer who repeatedly falls from his board, which rises behind him like a tombstone, at the end of the novel she cannot help, in spite of grief, to see that life goes on in all its power, exhilaration and tragedy.

Some readers identify a link between Jim and Imogen and Adam and Eve, with the estuary as the garden of Eden. This subtle parallel is used by Malouf to explore the key theme of innocence and experience. The idyllic "eden" of the estuary contrasts boldly with the hellish trenches. The novel consists of dualities: war and peace, life and death, innocence and experience, wealth and poverty, natural and man-made. However, these binaries are tinged with ambiguity. While the 'sanctuary' is idyllic, it is in this time and place of 'innocence' that Jim saw his brother killed on the farm, and had to live with the venomous and destructive despair of his father. Conversely, in the trenches, friendship is rich and the bird life is miraculous.

Malouf was regarded as a poet before he wrote novels, and much of his writing in this novel is poetic. Malouf himself describes it as a novel which explores ideas (such as the meaning or purpose of life) rather than story.

== Opera adaptation ==
Fly Away Peter has been adapted as an opera by Elliott Gyger and Pierce Wilcox. The opera's first performance was in Sydney in May 2015, by the Sydney Chamber Opera.

== Awards and nominations ==
- Australian Literature Society Gold Medal, 1983: joint winner with Malouf's short story collection Child's Play
- The Age Book of the Year Award, Imaginative Writing Prize, 1982: winner
- The Age Book of the Year Award, Book of the Year, 1982: winner

== See also ==
- 1982 in Australian literature
