= Child's Play (novella) =

1981 novella by David Malouf

- Short story by David Malouf
- Language: English
- Genre: Literary novella

Publication
- Published in: Child's Play / The Bread of Time to Come : Two Novellas by David Malouf
- Publication type: Print (Paperback)
- Publication date: 1981

Child's Play (1981) is a novella written by Australian author David Malouf. It was originally published by George Braziller Inc in the USA as a part of the volume titled Child's Play / The Bread of Time to Come : Two Novellas.

This novella was the co-winner of the 1983 ALS Gold Medal with Malouf's novella Fly Away Peter.

== Plot summary ==
The novella is narrated by a 29-year-old terrorist who has been charged with the assassination of an 80-year-old Italian author, known as "The Master".

== Critical reception ==
Reviewing the Chatto and Windus collection for The Canberra Times Marian Eldridge noted that "Malouf's ideas about man in the world are interesting; his prose is always elegant." Though she did conclude that the novella seemed rather "hollow".

In Australian Book Review Laurie Clancy called the book "a meditation, filled with dreams and reflections, a philosophical disquisition even, the thrust of which is not easy to grasp." He went on to state that the story's prose is "aloof, objective, classicist, though not without an occasional rhetorical flourish, and inclined to move towards abstraction."

== Publication history ==
After the novella's initial publication in 1981 it was reprinted as follows:

- 1982 Child's Play / Eustace / The Prowler by David Malouf, Chatto and Windus, UK
- 1983 Child's Play / Eustace / The Prowler by David Malouf, Penguin Books, Australia
- 1999 Child's Play / Eustace / The Prowler by David Malouf, Vintage Books, USA
