= ALS Gold Medal =

Annual Australian literary award

The Australian Literature Society Gold Medal (ALS Gold Medal) is awarded annually by the Association for the Study of Australian Literature for "an outstanding literary work in the preceding calendar year." From 1928 to 1974 it was awarded by the Australian Literature Society, then from 1983 by the Association for the Study of Australian Literature, when the two organisations were merged.

== Award winners ==
=== 1920s ===
Award winners
Year	Author	Work	Result	Ref.
1928	Martin Mills (Martin Boyd)	The Montforts	Winner	
1929	Henry Handel Richardson	Ultima Thule	Winner	

=== 1930s ===
Award winners
Year	Author	Work	Result	Ref.
1930	Vance Palmer	The Passage	Winner	
1931	Frank Dalby Davison	Man-Shy	Winner	
1932	Leonard Mann	Flesh in Armour	Winner	
1933	G. B. Lancaster (Edith J. Lyttleton)	Pageant	Winner	
1934	Eleanor Dark	Prelude to Christopher	Winner	
1935	Winifred Birkett	Earth's Quality	Winner	
1936	Eleanor Dark	Return to Coolami	Winner	
1937	Seaforth Mackenzie	The Young Desire It	Winner	
1938	R. D. FitzGerald	Moonlight Acre	Winner	
1939	Xavier Herbert	Capricornia	Winner	

=== 1940s ===
Award winners
Year	Author	Work	Result	Ref.
1940	William Baylebridge	This Vital Flesh	Winner	
1941	Patrick White	Happy Valley	Winner	
1942	Kylie Tennant	The Battlers	Winner	
1943	No award presented			
1944	No award presented			
1945	No award presented			
1946	No award presented			
1947	No award presented			
1948	Herz Bergner	Between Sky and Sea	Winner	
1949	Percival Serle	Dictionary of Australian Biography	Winner	

=== 1950s ===
Award winners
Year	Author	Work	Result	Ref.
1950	Jon Cleary	Just Let Me Be	Winner	
1951	Rex Ingamells	The Great South Land: An Epic Poem	Winner	
1952	T. A. G. Hungerford	The Ridge and the River	Winner	
1953	No award presented			
1954	Mary Gilmore	Fourteen Men	Winner	
1955	Patrick White	The Tree of Man	Winner	
1956	No award presented			
1957	Martin Boyd	A Difficult Young Man	Winner	
1958	No award presented			
1959	Randolph Stow	To the Islands	Winner	

=== 1960s ===
Award winners
Year	Author	Work	Result	Ref.
1960	William Hart-Smith	Poems of Discovery	Winner	
1961	No award presented			
1962	Vincent Buckley	Masters in Israel	Winner	
1963	John Morrison	Twenty-Three: Stories	Winner	
1964	Geoffrey Blainey	The Rush that Never Ended	Winner	
1965	Patrick White	The Burnt Ones	Winner	
1966	A. D. Hope		Winner	
1967	No award presented			
1968	No award presented			
1969	No award presented			

=== 1970s ===
Award winners
Year	Author	Work	Result	Ref.
1970	Manning Clark		Winner	
1971	Colin Badger		Winner	
1972	Alex Buzo	Macquarie	Winner	
1973	Francis Webb		Winner	
1974	David Malouf	Neighbours in a Thicket	Winner	
1975	No award presented			
1976	No award presented			
1977	No award presented			
1978	No award presented			
1979	No award presented			

=== 1980s ===
Award winners
Year	Author	Work	Result	Ref.
1980	No award presented			
1981	No award presented			
1982	No award presented			
1983	David Malouf	Child's Play; Fly Away Peter	Winner	
1984	Les Murray	The People's Otherworld: Poems	Winner	
1985	David Ireland	Archimedes and the Seagle	Winner	
1986	Thea Astley	Beachmasters	Winner	
1987	Alan Wearne	The Nightmarkets	Winner	
1988	Brian Matthews	Louisa	Winner	
1989	Frank Moorhouse	Forty-Seventeen	Winner	

=== 1990s ===
Award winners
Year	Author	Work	Result	Ref.
1990	Peter Porter	Possible Worlds	Winner	
1991	Elizabeth Jolley	Cabin Fever	Winner	
1992	Rodney Hall	The Second Bridegroom	Winner	
1993	Elizabeth Riddell	Selected Poems	Winner	
1994	Louis Nowra	Radiance and The Temple	Winner	
1995	Helen Demidenko	The Hand That Signed the Paper	Winner	
1996	Amanda Lohrey	Camille's Bread	Winner	
1997	Robert Dessaix	Night Letters	Winner	
1998	James Cowan	A Mapmaker's Dream	Winner	
1999	Murray Bail	Eucalyptus	Winner	

=== 2000s ===
Award winners and finalists
Year	Author	Work	Result	Ref.
2000	Drusilla Modjeska	Stravinsky's Lunch	Winner	
2001	Rodney Hall	The Day We Had Hitler Home	Winner	
2002	Richard Flanagan	Gould's Book of Fish	Winner	
2003	Kate Jennings	Moral Hazard	Winner	
2004	Laurie Duggan	Mangroves	Winner	
2005	Gail Jones	Sixty Lights	Winner	
2006	Gregory Day	The Patron Saint of Eels	Winner	
2007	Alexis Wright	Carpentaria	Winner	
2008	Michelle de Kretser	The Lost Dog	Winner	
2008	J. S. Harry	Not Finding Wittgenstein	Shortlisted	
2008	Rhyll McMaster	Feather Man	Shortlisted	
2008	David Malouf	Typewriter Music	Shortlisted	
2008	Alex Miller	Landscape of Farewell	Shortlisted	
2009	Christos Tsiolkas	The Slap	Winner	
2009	John Clanchy	Her Father's Daughter	Shortlisted	
2009	Helen Garner	The Spare Room	Shortlisted	
2009	Evelyn Juers	House of Exile: The Life and Times of Heinrich Mann and Nelly Kroeger-Mann	Shortlisted	
2009	John Kinsella	Divine Comedy: Journeys Through Regional Geography	Shortlisted	
2009	Chris Wallace-Crabbe	Telling a Hawk from a Handsaw	Shortlisted	

=== 2010s ===
Award winners and finalists
Year	Author	Work	Result	Ref.
2010	David Malouf	Ransom	Winner	
2010	John Kinsella	The Darwin Poems	Shortlisted	
2010	Steven Carroll	The Lost Life	Shortlisted	
2010	Eva Hornung	Dog Boy	Shortlisted	
2010	Cate Kennedy	The World Beneath	Shortlisted	
2011	Kim Scott	That Deadman Dance	Winner	
2011	Peter Boyle	Apocrypha	Shortlisted	
2011	Peter Goldsworthy	Gravel	Shortlisted	
2011	Kirsten Tranter	The Legacy	Shortlisted	
2011	Chris Womersley	Bereft	Shortlisted	
2012	Gillian Mears	Foal's Bread	Winner	
2012	Steven Amsterdam	What the Family Needed	Shortlisted	
2012	Christopher Edwards	People of Earth	Shortlisted	
2012	Diane Fahey	The Wing Collection: New & Selected Poems	Shortlisted	
2012	Favel Parrett	Past the Shallows	Shortlisted	
2012	Anna Funder	All That I Am	Shortlisted	
2012	Gail Jones	Five Bells	Shortlisted	
2012	Alex Miller	Autumn Laing	Shortlisted	
2012	Elliot Perlman	The Street Sweeper	Shortlisted	
2012	Gig Ryan	Gig Ryan: New and Selected Poems	Shortlisted	
2012	Jaya Savige	Surface to Air	Shortlisted	
2013	Michelle de Kretser	Questions of Travel	Winner	
2013	Jessie Cole	Darkness on the Edge of Town	Shortlisted	
2013	Robert Drewe	Montebello	Shortlisted	
2013	Christopher Koch	Lost Voices	Shortlisted	
2013	P. A. O'Reilly	The Fine Colour of Rust	Shortlisted	
2014	Alexis Wright	The Swan Book	Winner	
2014	Eleanor Limprecht	What Was Left	Shortlisted	
2014	Luke Carman	An Elegant Young Man	Shortlisted	
2014	Hannah Kent	Burial Rites	Shortlisted	
2014	Christos Tsiolkas	Barracuda	Shortlisted	
2014	Alex Miller	Coal Creek	Shortlisted	
2015	Jennifer Maiden	Drones and Phantoms	Winner	
2015	Joan London	The Golden Age	Shortlisted	
2015	David Malouf	Earth Hour	Shortlisted	
2015	Favel Parrett	When the Night Comes	Shortlisted	
2015	Inga Simpson	Nest	Shortlisted	
2016	Brenda Niall	Mannix	Winner	
2016	James Bradley	Clade	Shortlisted	
2016	Tegan Bennett Daylight	Six Bedrooms	Shortlisted	
2016	Drusilla Modjeska	Second Half First	Shortlisted	
2017	Zoe Morrison	Music and Freedom	Winner	
2017	Steven Amsterdam	The Easy Way Out	Shortlisted	
2017	Georgia Blain	Between a Wolf and a Dog	Shortlisted	
2017	Peter Boyle	Ghostspeaking	Shortlisted	
2017	Heather Rose	The Museum of Modern Love	Shortlisted	
2017	Rajith Savanadasa	Ruins	Shortlisted	
2018	Shastra Deo	The Agonist	Winner	
2018	Peter Carey	A Long Way from Home	Shortlisted	
2018	Eva Hornung	The Last Garden	Shortlisted	
2018	Sofie Laguna	The Choke	Shortlisted	
2018	Steven Lang	Hinterland	Shortlisted	
2018	Gerald Murnane	Border Districts	Shortlisted	
2019	Pam Brown	click here for what we do	Winner	
2019	Luke Beesley	Aqua Spinach	Shortlisted	
2019	Laura Elizabeth Woollett	Beautiful Revolutionary	Shortlisted	
2019	Charmaine Papertalk Green and John Kinsella	False Claims of Colonial Thieves	Shortlisted	
2019	Jamie Marina Lau	Pink Mountain on Locust Island	Shortlisted	
2019	Gail Jones	The Death of Noah Glass	Shortlisted	

=== 2020s ===
Award winners and finalists
Year	Author	Work	Result	Ref.
2020	Charmaine Papertalk Green	Nganajungu Yagu	Winner	
2020	Jordie Albiston	Element	Shortlisted	
2020	Favel Parrett	There Was Still Love	Shortlisted	
2020	Carrie Tiffany	Exploded View	Shortlisted	
2020	Charlotte Wood	The Weekend	Shortlisted	
2021	Nardi Simpson	Song of the Crocodile	Winner	
2021	Robbie Arnott	The Rain Heron	Shortlisted	
2021	Ronnie Scott	The Adversary	Shortlisted	
2021	Ellen van Neerven	Throat	Shortlisted	
2021	Luke Best	Cadaver Dog	Shortlisted	
2021	Laura Jean McKay	The Animals in That Country	Shortlisted	
2022	Andy Jackson	Human Looking	Winner	
2022	Emily Bitto	Wild Abandon	Shortlisted	
2022	John Kinsella	Pushing Back	Shortlisted	
2022	S. J. Norman	Permafrost	Shortlisted	
2022	Elfie Shiosaki	Homecoming	Shortlisted	
2022	Maria Takolander	Trigger Warning	Shortlisted	
2023	Debra Dank	We Come With This Place	Winner	
2023	Robbie Arnott	Limberlost	Shortlisted	
2023	Fiona Kelly McGregor	Iris	Shortlisted	
2023	Gavin Yuan Gao	At the Altar of Touch	Shortlisted	
2023	Adam Ouston	Waypoints	Shortlisted	
2023	Charmaine Papertalk Green and John Kinsella	ART	Shortlisted	
2024	Alexis Wright	Praiseworthy	Winner	
2024	Jordie Albiston	Frank	Shortlisted	
2024	Stuart Barnes	Like to the Lark	Shortlisted	
2024	Katherine Brabon	Body Friend	Shortlisted	
2024	J. M. Coetzee	The Pole and Other Stories	Shortlisted	
2024	Omar Sakr	Non-Essential Work	Shortlisted	
2024	Sara M. Saleh	The Flirtation of Girls/Ghazal el-Banat	Shortlisted	
2025	Fiona McFarlane	Highway 13	Winner	
2025	Bonny Cassidy	Monument	Shortlisted	
2025	Brian Castro	Chinese Postman	Shortlisted	
2025	Melanie Cheng	The Burrow	Shortlisted	
2025	Helen Garner	The Season	Shortlisted	
2025	Nam Le	36 Ways of Writing a Vietnamese Poem	Shortlisted	
2025	Siang Lu	Ghost Cities	Shortlisted	
2026	Madeleine Watts	Elegy, Southwest	Winner	
2026	Randa Abdel-Fattah	Discipline	Shortlisted	
2026	Ender Başkan	Two Hundred Million Musketeers	Shortlisted	
2026	Raaza Jamshed	What Kept You?	Shortlisted	
2026	Luke Patterson	A Savage Turn	Shortlisted	
2026	Omar Sakr and Safdar Ahmed	The Nightmare Sequence	Shortlisted	

== See also ==
- Australian literature
