= Johnno =

1975 novel by David Malouf

- First edition
- Author: David Malouf
- Language: English
- Publisher: University of Queensland Press
- Publication date: 1975
- Publication place: Australia
- Media type: Print (hardback and paperback)
- Pages: 170 pp
- ISBN: 0-7022-0961-9
- OCLC: 1461700
- Dewey Decimal: 823
- LC Class: PZ4.M25565 Jo PR9619.3.M265
- Followed by: An Imaginary Life

Johnno is a semi-autobiographical novel written by Australian author David Malouf and was first published in 1975. It was Malouf's first novel.

In 2004 it was selected by the Brisbane City Council as the joint-winner of the annual One Book One Brisbane competition to find the book that best represents Brisbane. Johnno shared the honours with another, more recent, debut novel, The Girl Most Likely by Rebecca Sparrow. It is one of the best known "Brisbane" novels ever written.

The book has been adapted for the stage. It premiered at Brisbane's La Boite Theatre in 2006 and then transferred to the Derby Playhouse.

== Plot summary and major themes ==
Johnno is written in the first person past tense and the narrator is only ever known by the nickname "Dante". Johnno is heavily autobiographical. The novel is centred upon the friendship between Dante and a schoolmate known as "Johnno" in their adolescence and early adulthood in the 1940s and 1950s in Brisbane.

The subtropical Brisbane environment and various elements of upper-class Australian culture in the twentieth century recur throughout the book. There are many references to Brisbane's verdant gardens and parklands and other aspects of its urban geography such as its now-defunct tramways and the Brisbane River.

The novel takes the form of an extended reminiscence and begins with the narrator finding a photograph of Johnno among his recently deceased father's belongings. The story then begins in Dante's childhood and education at Brisbane Grammar School and then follows the development of the friendship between the staid, conventional Dante and the unruly, eccentric and frequently intoxicated Johnno through school, university and a period of Bohemian-style living in Europe. The novel ends with Johnno presumed to have committed suicide (though the reader does not know for sure) and his funeral in suburban Brisbane.

Johnno engages in shoplifting and goes to brothels, which contrasts with his friend Dante's middle class conservatism.

Though both major characters reference gay experiences Malouf explicitly denies that Johnno is a gay novel.

Readers of a later and more knowing time have taken this to be a gay novel in disguise. It is not. If I had meant to write a gay novel I would have done so. If there was more to tell about these characters I would have told it.

Johnno's occasional experience that way is frankly admitted, so is Dante's relationship with his "boy from Sarina", but they do not see themselves as being defined by these involvements and they are not.

== Epilogue ==
In an epilogue written over two decades after Johnno was first published, David Malouf makes clear that Johnno's character is based on a real schoolfriend of his, John Milliner, who died in 1962.

== Notes ==
- Dedication: "for Carlo Olivieri."
- Epigraph: "I have great comfort from this fellow. Methinks he hath no drowning mark upon him; his complexion is perfect gallows. Stand fast, good Fate, to his hanging! Make the rope of his destiny our cable, for our own doth little advantage. If he be not born to be hanged, our case is miserable." (Shakespeare)
