= There Was Still Love =

2019 novel by Favel Parrett

- Author: Favel Parrett
- Genre: Fiction
- Publisher: Hachette Australia
- Publication date: 24 September 2019
- Publication place: Australia
- Pages: 224
- ISBN: 9780733630682

There Was Still Love is a 2019 novel by Favel Parrett. The novel follows two Czechoslovak sisters, one of whom relocates to Australia while the other stays in Prague. The story is based on that of Parrett's own grandmother.

== Reception ==
There Was Still Love received positive reviews in the Sydney Morning Herald, The Saturday Paper, and Australian Book Review. The novel was described by the judges of the Stella Prize as a "confident, sparkling novel that brings to life the story of a family regrouping after the impacts of the German occupation of Czechoslovakia with warmth and resonance".

== Awards ==
Awards for There Was Still Love
| Year | Award | Category | Result | Ref. |
|---|---|---|---|---|
| 2020 | Indie Book Awards | Book of the Year | Won | |
| 2020 | Indie Book Awards | Fiction Book of the Year | Won | |
| 2020 | Stella Prize | — | Shortlisted | |
| 2020 | ALS Gold Medal | — | Shortlisted | |
| 2020 | Barbara Jefferis Award | — | Shortlisted | |
