= Favel Parrett =

Australian novelist

- Born: Favel Parrett; 1974 (age 51–52); Australia
- Occupation: Writer
- Known for: Past the Shallows (2011); There Was Still Love
- Website: http://www.favelparrett.com.au/

Favel Parrett (born 1974) is an Australian writer.

== Career ==
Parrett's first novel, Past the Shallows, was shortlisted for the Miles Franklin Award in 2012 and also that year won the Dobbie Literary Prize and Newcomer of the Year at the Australian Book Industry Awards. She was awarded the Antarctic Arts Fellowship, allowing her to travel to Antarctica to complete research for her second novel, When the Night Comes. Her latest adult novel, There Was Still Love, was published in September 2019 by Hachette Australia.

Her first children’s book, Wandi, was published in September 2021. It is a fictional retelling of the true story of a purebred Alpine dingo cub that survived being dropped by an eagle into the backyard of a home in the small town of Wandiligong, in Victoria’s alpine valleys, and later became the subject of a successful research and breeding program for the threatened species.

Parrett also writes short stories, which have been published in journals and anthologies including Meanjin, Island Magazine, Best Australian Stories and Griffith Review.

== Bibliography ==
=== Novels ===
- Past the Shallows (2011)
- When the Night Comes (2014)
- There Was Still Love (2019)
- Wandi (2021)
- Kimmi: Queen of the Dingoes (2023)
- One for Sorrow (2026)

== Awards ==
- 2022 shortlisted for Indie Book Awards Children's Book
- 2024 shortlisted for Indie Book Awards Children's Book

Year	Work	Award	Category	Result	Ref
2012	Past the Shallows	Australian Book Industry Awards	Newcomer	Won	
2012	Past the Shallows	Australian Book Industry Awards	Literary Fiction	Shortlisted	
2012	Past the Shallows	BookPeople Booksellers' Choice Award	—	Shortlisted	
2012	Past the Shallows	Dobbie Literary Award	—	Won	
2012	Past the Shallows	Indie Book Award	Debut Fiction	Shortlisted	
2012	Past the Shallows	Melbourne Prize for Literature	—	Shortlisted	
2012	Past the Shallows	Miles Franklin Award	—	Shortlisted	
2015	When the Night Comes	ALS Gold Medal	—	Shortlisted	
2015	When the Night Comes	Australian Book Industry Awards	Literary Fiction	Shortlisted	
2015	When the Night Comes	BookPeople Booksellers' Choice Award	—	Shortlisted	
2015	When the Night Comes	Indie Book Award	Fiction	Shortlisted	
2015	When the Night Comes	Miles Franklin Award	—	Longlisted	
2020	There Was Still Love	ALS Gold Medal	—	Shortlisted	
2020	There Was Still Love	Australian Book Industry Awards	Literary Fiction	Shortlisted	
2020	There Was Still Love	Barbara Jefferis Award	—	Shortlisted	
2020	There Was Still Love	Indie Book Award	Fiction	Won	
2020	There Was Still Love	Stella Prize	—	Shortlisted	
