= Dream Stuff =

Collection of short stories by David Malouf

- First edition
- Author: David Malouf
- Language: English
- Genre: Short stories
- Publisher: Chatto and Windus
- Publication date: 13 April 2000
- Publication place: Australia
- Media type: Print (hardback & paperback)
- Pages: 224 pp. (first edition, hardcover)
- ISBN: 0-7011-6942-7 (first edition, hardcover)

Dream Stuff is a collection of short stories by the Australian writer David Malouf, published in 2000.

== Contents ==
- "At Schindler's"
- "Closer"
- "Blacksoil Country"
- "Jacko's Reach"
- "Lone Pine"
- "Night Training"
- "Sally's Story"
- "Great Day"

== Jacko's Reach Summary ==
A local council in Sydney, Australia, plans to develop a vacant area called Jacko's Reach. Valmay Mitchell, a thirteen-year-old girl, disappeared when she was in seventh grade — she had last been seen going into Jacko's Reach with a boy on a bike. Searchers cannot find her, but instead discover items they'd lost and spent years looking for. Valmay is later discovered to be pregnant and living in Sydney.

== Reception ==
Peter Craven, in The Sydney Morning Herald, found that in its "finest moments" the author "moves cat-like, with the economy of the true poet to whom language is a musical, not an approximate, medium". Kate Kellaway, of The Observer, similarly felt the collection showed Malouf "at his absolute best".
