= The Night Guest (novel) =

2013 novel by Australian author Fiona McFarlane

- Author: Fiona McFarlane
- Language: English
- Genre: Novel
- Publisher: Penguin
- Publication date: 21 August 2013
- Publication place: Australia
- Media type: Print
- Pages: 304 pp.
- ISBN: 9781926428550

The Night Guest is a 2013 novel by the Australian author Fiona McFarlane.

== Synopsis ==
Widowed Ruth is living a solitary life in her New South Wales beach house when, one night, she believes she is visited by a tiger. The next morning a woman named Frida arrives at the house, stating that she has been sent by the government to help out.

== Critical reception ==
Lucy Sussex, writing in The Sydney Review of Book, noted: "There is subterfuge, smuggling, in the writing of The Night Guest. It imports 'genre' techniques into the genre 'literary'. To achieve the necessary suspension of disbelief, the tiger displays no magic, does not talk. It is depicted with extreme realism...At the heart of this novel, McFarlane is describing a very sad and inevitable situation, one that even the highest in the land properly fear: to be old and helpless, and potentially someone else’s prey. Yet who is the predator: the imaginary beast or the post-colonial haunter? Here is domestic realism, the beach hamlet acutely observed, but with a resident tiger, secrets, lies, and a very banal but nonetheless venal conspiracy."

In The Guardian reviewer Justine Jordan found much to like with the book: "In Fiona McFarlane's impressive debut, widowed Ruth senses a tiger prowling around her isolated New South Wales beach house: a flight of fancy that foreshadows the arrival of a far more dangerous beast. The tropes may not be new, but McFarlane puts them at the service of a powerfully distinctive narrative about identity and memory, the weight of a life and the approach of death...The achievement of McFarlane's book is to demonstrate with such clarity and measured compassion that the mind, in the end, is where all tigers live."

== Publishing history ==
After the novel's initial publication in Australia by Penguin in 2013, it was reprinted as follows:

- Sceptre, UK, 2013 and 2014
- Farrar Straus and Giroux, USA, 2013
- Penguin, Australia 2014

The novel was also translated into Czech in 2013, Polish, Korean, Dutch, Catalan, Italian, German, Chinese and French in 2014, and Russian and Japanese in 2015.

== Awards ==
- Barbara Jefferis Award, 2014, joint winner
- Guardian First Book Award, 2014, shortlisted
- New South Wales Premier's Literary Awards UTS Glenda Adams Award for New Writing, 2014, winner
- Prime Minister's Literary Awards Fiction, 2014, shortlisted
- Stella Prize, 2014, shortlisted

== See also ==
- 2013 in Australian literature
