= A Mapmaker's Dream =

1996 novel by Australian writer James Cowan

A Mapmaker’s Dream: The Meditations of Fra Mauro, Cartographer to the Court of Venice
- Author: James Cowan
- Language: English
- Genre: Fiction
- Publisher: Shambhala Publications
- Publication date: 1996
- Publication place: Australia
- Media type: Print
- Pages: 151 pp.
- Awards: ALS Gold Medal winner 1998
- ISBN: 1570621969
- Preceded by: The Deposition
- Followed by: The Painted Shore

A Mapmaker’s Dream: The Meditations of Fra Mauro, Cartographer to the Court of Venice (1996) is a novel by Australian writer James Cowan. It was originally published by Shambhala Publications in USA in 1996.

The novel is subtitled: "The Meditations Of Fra Mauro, Cartographer To The Court Of Venice".

== Synopsis ==
The novel is based on the journals of the 15th-century monk Fra Mauro, who created a detailed map of the world, known as the Fra Mauro map.

== Publishing history ==
After its initial publication in USA by Shambhala Publications in 1996, the novel was reprinted as follows:

- Vintage Books, Australia, 1997
- Hodder & Stoughton, UK, 1997
- Warner Books, USA, 1997
- Sceptre, UK, 1998

The novel was also translated into German in 1997, and Italian in 1999.

== Critical reception ==
Sally James, writing in The Australian Jewish News Noted: "Throughout A Mapmaker’s Dream, which reads like a diary, Mauro reveals that his mission was not so much to depict where people had travelled to but who they were and what they thought. A type of exploration not yet known to the ‘civilised’ world...Mauro offers a highly interpretative account of the many travellers who approach him. Consistent mention is made of the inadequacy he felt being an observer, not a participator. Believing himself to be at the mercy of other men's observations, Mauro remained at the monastery, lacking the courage to leave and see the origins of the tales that captivated him."

== Awards ==
- ALS Gold Medal winner 1998

== See also ==
- 1996 in Australian literature
