= John Morrison (writer) =

British-born Australian novelist and short story writer

- Born: January 29, 1904; Sunderland, U.K.
- Died: May 11, 1998 (aged 94); Melbourne
- Resting place: Melbourne
- Citizenship: Australian
- Occupations: Labourer, gardener and writer
- Spouse(s): Frances Jones (d.1967); Rachel Gordon (m.1969)
- Writing career
- Language: English
- Genre: Fiction
- Notable works: The Creeping City (1949), Port of Call (1950)

John Gordon Morrison AM (29 January 1904 – 11 May 1998) was a British-born Australian novelist and short story writer.

== Life ==
John Morrison was born in Sunderland, England on 29 January 1904. His interest in flora and the natural world saw him begin work at the Sunderland Museum and Winter Gardens at the age of 14. After two and a half years there he went to work as a learner-gardener for a wealthy shipowner at East Boldon

His first wife was Frances Jones (?-1967). They had two children: John, and Marie. He married his second wife, Rachel Gordon (?-1997), in 1969.

== Australia ==
He migrated to Australia in 1923 and initially worked on sheep-stations in New South Wales.

His first Australian job was in the garden of historic Zara Station at Wanganella, outback of Deniliquin. The wide open spaces gave him a sense of freedom: warm friendship with his mates imbued him with the confidence to explore the Australian working class milieu in his stories, and he determined to live out his life in this place of "glamor and independence".
Family pressure took him back to England in 1927 — there was a crippled brother suffering from infantile paralysis — but the brief visit was disastrous due to his intense homesickness for Australia. From this unhappy time comes one of his best short stories, The Incense Burner. An Aussie digger exiled to a shabby London rooming house lives and dies with no comfort other than the scent of smouldering eucalyptus leaves.

On his return to Australia, he and Frances settled in Melbourne in 1928, where he began a ten-year stint working on the Melbourne waterfront and, later, as a gardner. He subsequently joined the Communist Party of Australia. He worked as a gardener at Caulfield Grammar School from 1950 to 1963.

== Writer ==
He published his first stories under the name of "Gordon", and later as "John Morrison", in trade union publications during this time. He was later a member of the Realist Writers Group and went on to publish a number of short stories in newspapers, two novels, four collections of stories and a book of essays.

After leaving the waterfront he worked as a jobbing gardener based in Mentone. He later worked as a gardner at Caulfield Grammar School until 1963, when he became a full-time writer; publishing also book reviews and journalism.

Morrison, “likened the writer to the man who comes across an interesting rock or stone and puts it in his pocket. For months, perhaps years, he carries it about, rolling it in his hands from time to time until it is polished. His stories, he said, were like these stones.”

His literary friends and associates included John Behan, Alan Marshall, Frank Dalby Davison, Frank Hardy and Judah Waten. He was a member of the Realist Writers Group.

== Awards ==
He won a number of short story competitions.

He was awarded a Commonwealth Literary Fund grant in both 1948 and 1949, the Gold Medal of the Australian Literature Society in 1963, and the Patrick White Literary Award in 1986. He was made a Member of the Order of Australia in the 1989 Queens Birthday Honours List.

== Bibliography ==
=== Novels ===
- The Creeping City (1949)
- Port of Call (1950)

=== Short fiction ===
Collections

- Sailors Belong Ships (1947)
- Black Cargo (1955)
- Twenty-Three : Stories (1962)
- John Morrison, Selected Stories (1972)
- North Wind (1982)
- Stories of the Waterfront (1984)
- This Freedom (1985)
- The Best Stories of John Morrison (1988)

Stories

Title	Year	First published	Reprinted/collected	Notes
Tinkle, tinkle, little bell	1965	Morrison, John (March 1965). "Tinkle, tinkle, little bell". Meanjin Quarterly. 24 (1): 89–99.	North Wind	

=== Non-fiction ===
Books

- Australian by Choice (essays, 1973)
- The Happy Warrior (memoirs, 1987)

Journalism

- "That'll be the bloody day!", The (Sydney) Tribune, (Tuesday, 10 July 1973), p.7.

== Death ==
He died in Melbourne on 11 May 1998.

== Legacy ==
In 1974, the Victorian branch of the Fellowship of Australian Writers instituted The John Morrison Short Story Award, "an award for a story of up to 3000 words on any theme".

== See also ==
- List of Caulfield Grammar School people

== Portraits ==
- Kahan, Louis (not dated), felt tip pen portrait of John Morrison, University of Melbourne Library Print Collection.
- John Gordon Morrison, Wharf Labourer and Author; Recipient of the Patrick White Literary Award, 1986 and the Order of Australia, 1989, Australian National University Library Collection.
- Bolton, A.T., Portrait of John Morrison, Ripponlea, 1986, National Library of Australia.
