= Bicycle and Other Poems =

Poetry collection by David Malouf

- First edition
- Author: David Malouf
- Language: English
- Genre: poetry collection
- Publisher: University of Queensland Press
- Publication date: 1970
- Publication place: Australia
- Media type: Print
- Pages: 60 pp
- ISBN: 0702206113
- Preceded by: –
- Followed by: Neighbours in a Thicket : Poems

Bicycle and Other Poems (1970) is the debut poetry collection by Australian poet and author David Malouf. It was originally published in 1970 by University of Queensland Press.

The collection consists of 41 poems, several of which were previously published in various Australian poetry and general magazines, with the majority published here for the first time.

== Contents ==
- "The Year of the Foxes"
- "Stars"
- "The Comforters"
- "The Music Lesson"
- "From a Classroom in the Fifties"
- "From a Plague Year"
- "At Kew Gardens"
- "Student with a Poem"
- "Birthday Poem"
- "Health Farm"
- "Glasshouse Mountains"
- "Letter from North Queensland: 1892"
- "Four Odes of Horace : I, ix"
- "Five Odes of Horace : I, xi"
- "Four Odes of Horace : I, xxv"
- "Four Odes of Horace : I, xxvi"
- "Four Odes of Horace : I, xxxi"
- "High Wind at Evening"
- "The Judas Touch"
- "Sideshow Alley: Crazy House"
- "In Fever"
- "Wolf-Boy"
- "The Carp"
- "The Teacup World"
- "Suburban"
- "Easier"
- "Air Rifle"
- "This Day Under My Hand"
- "Babysitting"
- "Poem"
- "At a School Athletics Day"
- "After Minor Surgery"
- "From an Artist's Life: Leonardo"
- "Halfway Home"
- "On Refusing an All-Risk Insurance Policy"
- "Thaw"
- "Snow"
- "Summer"
- "Bicycle"
- "Sheer Edge"
- "The Death of a Borgia Pope"

== Critical reception ==
In a survey of three poetry collections from the University of Queensland Press, Geoffrey Page in The Canberra Times called this book "remarkable for its perception (particularly where personal experience is made universal) and for its verbal freshness." He then went on: "Malouf, unlike many poets, is able to find in his past experiences which don't merely illustrate certain established themes but have a specific quality of their own."

Jan Harry in Poetry Magazine found that a number of Malouf's poems "present their world through a steady build up of objects. It is a world that can be seen, felt, heard and consequently one that can be readily entered into...the surface is crowded with small sharp or bright details that create a kind of tapestry weave."

== See also ==
- 1970 in Australian literature
- 1970 in poetry
