= Typewriter Music =

2007 poetry collection by David Malouf

- Author: David Malouf
- Language: English
- Genre: Poetry collection
- Publisher: University of Queensland Press
- Publication date: 2007
- Publication place: Australia
- Media type: Print
- Pages: 85 pp
- Awards: 2008 Queensland Premier's Literary Awards — Poetry Collection – Arts Queensland Judith Wright Calanthe Award, winner
- ISBN: 9780702236310

Typewriter Music is a collection of poems by Australian poet David Malouf, published by University of Queensland Press in 2007.

The collection contains 48 poems. Several were originally published in literary magazines or poetry anthologies, with the bulk of the poems being published here for the first time.

It was the winner of the 2008 Queensland Premier's Literary Awards — Arts Queensland Judith Wright Calanthe Prize for Poetry.

== Contents ==
- "Revolving Days"
- "Out of Sight"
- "Moonflowers"
- "First Night"
- "Like Yesterday"
- "Funeral Games"
- "As It Comes"
- "Roofs"
- "Watertanks"
- "Typewriter Music"
- "Recalled"
- "Flights"
- "Millennium"
- "Like Our First Paintbox"
- "Poetry Makes Nothing Happen"
- "At the Ferry"
- "Reading Late at Campagnatico"
- "Making"
- "Seven Last Words of the Emperor Hadrian"
- "The Green Tavern : At Five in the Afternoon"
- "Goyesca"
- "A Second Ganymede"
- "On the Road (A Gypsy's Life)"
- "Psalter"
- "Straw"
- "Weathers"
- "Country"
- "Anvil"
- "Local Colour"
- "From the Book of Whispers"
- "Nocturnal"
- "Ombrone"
- "Moment : Dutch Interior"
- "Allemande"
- "Mozart to da Ponte"
- "A Little Walking Tour of Southern Tuscany"
- "A History Lesson"
- "Madonna and Child with Goldfinch"
- "An Essay on Angels (The Shorter Version)"
- "Owl"
- "Kites"
- "In the Field"
- "Towards"
- "Voyages"
- "Rockpools"
- "Stars"
- "The Catch"
- "Afterword"

== Critical reception ==
Luke Davies, in The Age newspaper, called Malouf a "master craftsman" in his review of this collection. He continued "in its deceptive simplicity and innovative joinery, Malouf's latest poetry resembles nothing so much as Shaker furniture – sturdy, elegant, deeply functional, restful to the eye and mind – and radiant because of rather than despite that simplicity."

In Australian Book Review critic Peter Porter noted in his review of this collection that "The muses of poetry insist on their right to be scatological and irreverent, and Malouf has been happy to compose under their aegis."

== Awards ==
- 2008 Queensland Premier's Literary Awards — Arts Queensland Judith Wright Calanthe Prize for Poetry
- 2008 The Age Book of the Year Award – Dinny O'Hearn Poetry Prize, shortlisted
- 2008 ALS Gold Medal, shortlisted
- 2008 New South Wales Premier's Literary Awards – Kenneth Slessor Prize for Poetry, shortlisted

== Notes ==
- The poet was interviewed about this collection by Rosemary Sorenson for The Weekend Australian.

== See also ==
- 2007 in Australian literature
