= Merlinda Bobis =

Philippine-Australian writer and academic

Merlinda Bobis (born 25 November 1959) is a contemporary Filipina-Australian writer and academic.

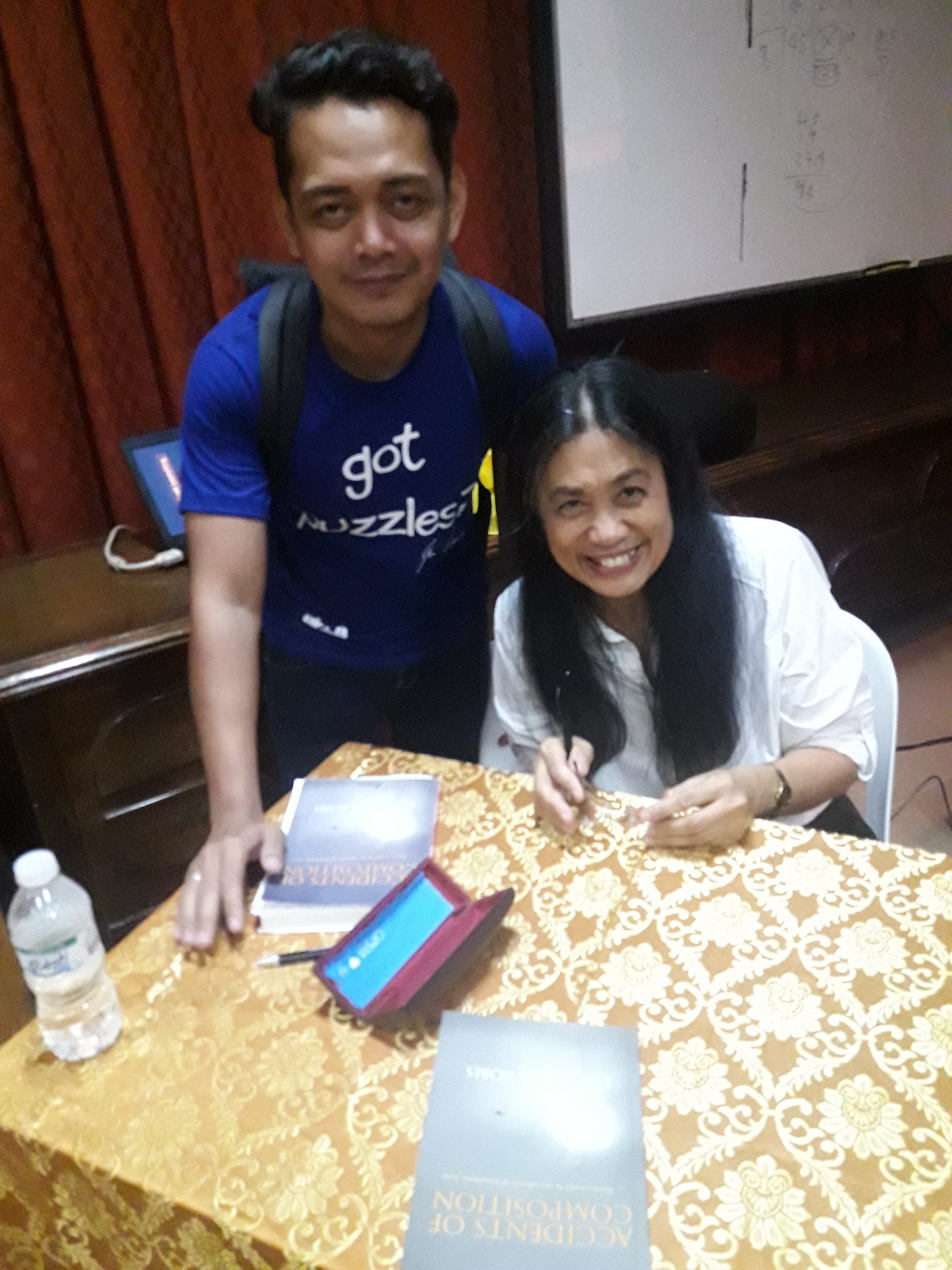

== Biography ==
Bobis was born on November 25, 1959 in Legazpi City, Albay, Philippines. She started writing poetry at the age of ten. She received her secondary education at Bicol University High School, then completed her B.A. at Aquinas University in Legazpi City, followed by a post-graduate degrees from the University of Santo Tomas. She achieved a Doctorate from the University of Wollongong in 1995, and now lives in Australia. Written in various genres in both Filipino and English, her work integrates elements of the traditional culture of the Philippines with modern immigrant experience.

Also a dancer and visual artist, Bobis has taught at Wollongong University.

Her play Rita's Lullaby was the winner of the 1998 Awgie for Best Radio Play and the international Prix Italia of the same year; in 2000 White Turtle won the Steele Rudd Award for the Best Collection of Australian Short Stories and the 2000 Philippine National Book Award. In 2006, she received the Gintong Aklat Award (Golden Book Award, Philippines) for her novel Banana Heart Summer, from the Book Development Association of the Philippines. She also won the 2016 Christina Stead Prize for Fiction and NSW Premier's Literary Awards for her book, Locust Girl: A Lovesong.

== Work ==
=== Poetry ===
- Rituals: Selected poems, 1985-1990. (1990)
- Summer was a Fast Train without Terminals. (Melbourne: Spinifex, 1998) ISBN 1-875559-76-0
- usaping ina at anak
- Accidents of Composition (Melbourne: Spinifex, 2017) ISBN 9781742199986
- "Mother's Break

=== Short stories ===
- White Turtle. (Melbourne: Spinifex, 1999) ISBN 1-875559-89-2 review
- The Kissing (Aunt Lute, 2001) ISBN 1-879960-60-5 [US reissue of White Turtle] review
- Dream Stories (Anvil Publishing, 2014) ISBN 9789712730184

=== Novels ===
- Banana Heart Summer (Murdoch Books, 2005) ISBN 1-74045-590-8
- The Solemn Lantern Maker (Sydney: Murdoch Books, 2008)
- Fish-hair Woman (North Melbourne: Spinifex, 2011)
- Locust Girl: A Lovesong (North Melbourne: Spinifex, 2015)
- The Kindness of Birds (North Melbourne: Spinifex, 2021) ISBN 9781925950304
- In the Name of the Trees (North Melbourne: Spinifex, 2025) ISBN 9781922964281

== Awards ==
Among her awards are:

- 2026: Prime Minister's Literary Awards: Shortlist, In the Name of the Trees
- 2026: ACT Literary Awards for Fiction: Winner, In the Name of the Trees
- 2021: Canberra Critics’ Circle Award: The Kindness of Birds
- 2021: New South Wales Premier's Literary Awards Christina Stead Prize for Fiction: Shortlisted, The Kindness of Birds
- 2016: New South Wales Premier's Literary Awards Christina Stead Prize for Fiction: Winner, Locust Girl: A Lovesong
- 2016: Philippine National Book Award: Locust Girl
- 2016: ACT Book of the Year Award: Shortlisted, Locust girl
- 2014: Philippine National Book Award: Fish-Hair Woman
- 2013: MUBA (Most Underrated Book Award): Winner, Fish-Hair Woman
- 2013: Davitt Award: Finalist, Fish-Hair Woman
- 2007: Australian Classical Music Award for Best Vocal/Choral Work of the Year: Daragang Magayon Cantata
- 2006: Gawad Pambansang Alagad ni Balagtas (National Balagtas Award: a lifetime award for author's poetry and prose in English, Pilipino, Bikol) from the Unyon ng Manunulat ng Pilipinas (Union of Philippine Writers)
- 2006: Gintong Aklat Award: Golden Book Award (Philippine publishers' award): Banana Heart Summer (2006)
- 2006: ALS Gold Medal: Shortlisted, Banana Heart Summer
- Manila Critics' Circle: Nomination for Best in Foreign Language in Fiction, Banana Heart Summer
- 2001: Bumbershoot Bookfair, Seattle Arts Festival: Judges' Choice Award, The Kissing (published as White Turtle in Australia and the Philippines)
- 2000: Queensland Premier's Literary Awards, Arts Queensland Steele Rudd Australian Short Story Award: Joint winner, White Turtle
- 2000: Philippine National Book Award for Fiction Manila Critics' Circle: Joint winner, White Turtle (2000)
- NSW Ministry for the Arts Writers' Fellowship for novel in progress: Fish-Hair Woman
- 2000: Canberra Writing Fellowship jointly from the Australian National University, the University of Canberra, and the Australian Defence Force Academy
- 1998: Prix Italia (international award): Rita's Lullaby (radio play) (1998)
- 1998: Australian Writers' Guild Award (AWGIE): Rita's Lullaby
- 1998: Pamana Philippine Presidential Award for achievement in the arts: Filipino expatriates
- 1998: The Age Poetry Book of the Year Award: Shortlisted, Summer Was a Fast Train Without Terminals (collection of poems)
- 1998: Out of the Ashes Trans-Tasman Short Story Competition: Winner, White Turtle (short story)
- 1998: Society of Women Writers National Short Story Competition: Commended, The Sadness Collector (short story)
- 1997: ABC Radio National's 'Books & Writing Short Story Competition': Joint Winner, The Tongue (also known as The Parable of Illawarra Street)
- 1995: Ian Reed Foundation Prize for Radio Drama: Rita's Lullaby
- 1995: Carlos Palanca Memorial Award in Literature (Philippine national award): Honourable Mention, Ms. Serena Serenata (one-act play)
- 1990: Gawad Cultural Centre of the Philippines National award for poetry in Filipino: Mula Dulo Hanggang Kanto ('From End to Corner', collection of poems)
- 1990: Likhaan Award: Daragang Magayon and other poems, University of the Philippines Writers' Workshop
- 1989: Carlos Palanca Memorial Award in Literature: Second Prize, Lupang di Hinirang: Kuwento at Sikreto ('Land Not Dearest: Story and Secret', collection of poems in Filipino)
- 1987: Carlos Palanca Memorial Award in Literature: Joint Winner, First Prize, Peopleness (collection of poems in English)

== Sources ==
- Biography
- Dr Merlinda Bobis
