= David Malouf =

Australian writer (1934–2026)

David Malouf AO FRSL
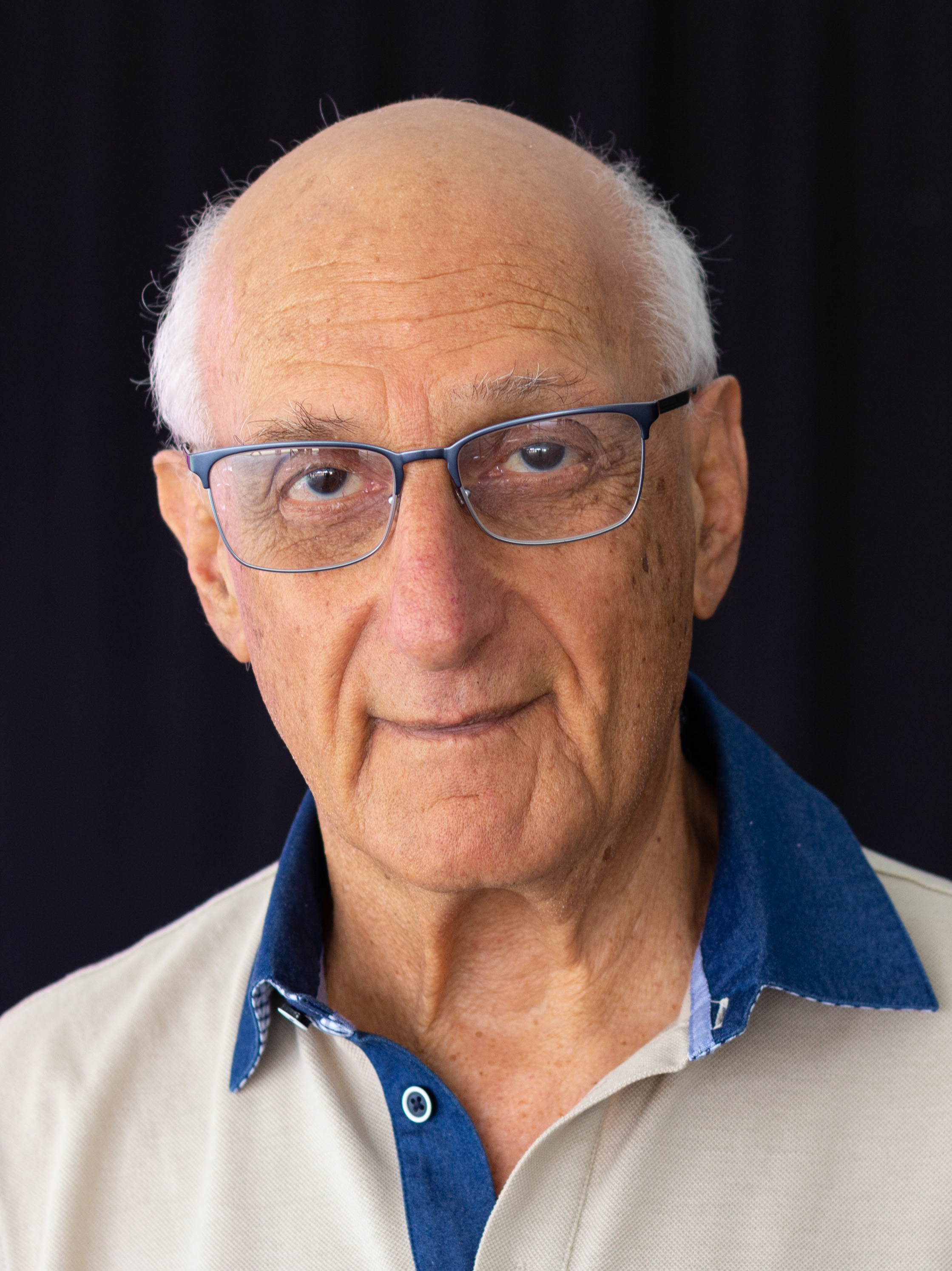
- Malouf in 2019
- Born: David George Joseph Malouf; 20 March 1934; Brisbane, Queensland, Australia
- Died: 22 April 2026 (aged 92); Gold Coast, Queensland, Australia
- Education: University of Queensland
- Occupations: Novelist; short story writer; poet; playwright
- Writing career
- Period: 1962–2018
- Genres: Novel; short story; poem; play; opera libretto
- Notable works: Bicycle and Other Poems; Neighbours in a Thicket : Poems; Johnno; An Imaginary Life; Fly Away Peter; The Great World; Remembering Babylon; Ransom
- Notable awards: Grace Leven Prize for Poetry; 1974; Australian Literature Society Gold Medal; 1974; Christina Stead Prize for Fiction; 1979; Pascall Prize; 1988; Miles Franklin Award; 1991; Prix Femina Étranger; 1991; Christina Stead Prize for Fiction; 1993; Prix Femina Étranger; 1994; Los Angeles Times Book Prize for Fiction; 1994; International Dublin Literary Award; 1996; Neustadt International Prize for Literature; 2000; Australia-Asia Literary Award; 2008; Australia Council Award for Lifetime Achievement in Literature; 2016

David George Joseph Malouf AO (/məˈluːf/, mə-LOOF; 20 March 1934 – 22 April 2026) was an Australian poet, novelist, short story writer, playwright and librettist. Elected a Fellow of the Royal Society of Literature in London in 2008, Malouf lectured at both the University of Queensland and the University of Sydney. He also delivered the 1998 Boyer Lectures.

Malouf's 1974 collection Neighbours in a Thicket: Poems won the Grace Leven Prize for Poetry and the Australian Literature Society Gold Medal. His 1990 novel The Great World won numerous awards, including the 1991 Miles Franklin Award and Prix Femina Étranger. His 1993 novel Remembering Babylon was shortlisted for the Booker Prize and won the 1994 Prix Femina Étranger, the 1994 Los Angeles Times Book Prize for Fiction, the 1995 Prix Baudelaire and the 1996 International Dublin Literary Award. Malouf was awarded the Neustadt International Prize for Literature in 2000, the Australia-Asia Literary Award in 2008 and the Australia Council Award for Lifetime Achievement in Literature in 2016. He was mentioned as a candidate for the Nobel Prize in Literature.

== Early life ==
Malouf was born on 20 March 1934 in Brisbane, Australia, to a Lebanese Christian father and an English-born mother of Sephardi Jewish descent. His paternal family had immigrated from Lebanon in the 1880s, while his mother's family had moved to England via the Netherlands, before migrating to Australia in 1913.

Malouf attended Brisbane Grammar School and graduated from the University of Queensland with a B.A. degree in 1955. He lectured for a short period before moving to London, where he taught at Holland Park School, before relocating to Birkenhead in 1962. He returned to Australia in 1968, taught at his old school, and lectured in English at the Universities of Queensland and Sydney.

== Writing ==
Though he would later become known abroad for his prose works, Malouf initially had concentrated on poetry. His first work appeared in 1962, as part of a book he shared with three other Australian poets. Malouf began writing full-time in 1977.

=== Poetry ===
His collection Neighbours in a Thicket: Poems (1974) had featured childhood memories, his mother, his sister, travelling in Europe and war. In 1992, he published Poems, 1959–1989. Some of his poetry was also collected in Revolving Days: Selected Poems (2008), which is divided into four sections: on childhood, then Europe, then relocating to Sydney, then travelling between Europe and Australia.

=== Novels ===
Malouf's first novel, Johnno (1975), is the semi-autobiographical tale of a young man growing up in Brisbane during the Second World War. Johnno engages in shoplifting and goes to brothels, which contrasts with his friend Dante's middle-class conservatism. La Boite Theatre adapted it for stage in 2006. An Imaginary Life (1978) is about the final years of Ovid. His 1982 novella about three acquaintances and their experience of the First World War was titled Fly Away Peter. Malouf's epic novel The Great World (1990) tells the story of two Australians and their relationship amid the turmoil of two World Wars, including imprisonment by the Japanese during World War II. His Booker Prize-shortlisted novel Remembering Babylon (1993) is set in northern Australia during the 1850s amid a community of English immigrant farmers (with one Scottish family) whose isolated existence is threatened by the arrival of a stranger, a young white man raised from boyhood by Indigenous Australians.

=== Short stories ===
Malouf wrote several collections of short stories, and a play, Blood Relations (1988). Australian critic Peter Craven described Malouf's 2006 short-story collection Every Move You Make as "as formidable and bewitching a collection of stories as you would be likely to find anywhere in the English-speaking world". Craven went on to state that "No one else in this country has: the maintenance of tone, the expertness of prose, the easeful transition between lyrical and realist effects. The man is a master, a superb writer, and also (which is not the same thing) a completely sophisticated literary gent". The Complete Stories appeared in 2007.

=== Libretti ===
He also wrote libretti for three operas, including Voss, an adaptation of the novel of the same name by Patrick White and first produced in the 1986 Adelaide Festival of Arts conducted by Stuart Challender; and Baa Baa Black Sheep (with music by Michael Berkeley), which combines a semi-autobiographical story by Rudyard Kipling with Kipling's Jungle Books. Malouf published his memoir, titled 12 Edmondstone Street, in 1985.

== Lecturing ==
Malouf delivered the 1998 Boyer Lectures on ABC Radio.

== Subject matter ==
Malouf's work tends to be set in Australia, though "a European sensibility" is also present according to an eNotes study guide.

His writing was characterised by a heightened sense of spatial relations, from the physical environments into which he takes his readers—whether within or outside built spaces, or in a natural landscape. He likened each of his succession of novels to the discovery and exploration of a new room in a house, rather than part of an overarching development. "At a certain point, you begin to see what the connections are between things, and you begin to know what space it is you are exploring."

From his first novel Johnno onwards, his themes focused on "male identity and soul-searching". He said that much of the male writing that preceded him "was about the world of action. I don't think that was ever an accurate description of men's lives". He identified Patrick White as the writer who turned this around in Australian literature—that White's writing was the kind "that goes behind inarticulacy and or unwillingness to speak, writing that gives the language of feeling to people who don't have it themselves".

Malouf also said that "I knew that the world around you is only uninteresting if you can't see what is really going on. The place you come from is always the most exotic place you'll ever encounter because it is the only place where you recognise how many secrets and mysteries there are in people's lives". However, after nearly four decades of writing, he concluded that in older writers can sometimes be found "a fading of the intensity of the imagination, and ... of the interest in the tiny details of life and behaviour—you see [writers] getting a bit impatient with that."

== Personal life and death ==
Malouf was homosexual. He lived in England and Tuscany, and for three decades spent most of his time in Sydney. In his later years Malouf lived in Queensland. He died in Gold Coast, Queensland, on 22 April 2026, aged 92.

== Awards and honours ==
Malouf was appointed an Officer of the Order of Australia (AO) in the 1987 Australia Day Honours for services to literature.

As well as his numerous accolades for fiction, Malouf was awarded the Pascall Prize for Critical Writing in 1988. In 2008, Malouf won the Australian Publishers Association's Lloyd O'Neil Award for outstanding service to the Australian book industry. He was elected a Fellow of the Royal Society of Literature in 2008. He was also an Honorary Fellow of the Australian Academy of the Humanities.

- 1974: Grace Leven Prize for Poetry, for Neighbours in a Thicket: Poems
- 1974: Townsville Foundation for Australian Literary Studies Award, for Neighbours in a Thicket: Poems
- 1974: Australian Literature Society Gold Medal, for Neighbours in a Thicket: Poems
- 1974: Colin Roderick Award, for Neighbours in a Thicket: Poems
- 1979: New South Wales Premier's Literary Awards, Christina Stead Prize for Fiction, for An Imaginary Life
- 1982: The Age Book of the Year Award, for Fly Away Peter
- 1983: Australian Literature Society Gold Medal, for Child's Play and Fly Away Peter
- 1985: Victorian Premier's Literary Award, for Antipodes
- 1990: National Library of Australia National Audio Book-of-the-Year Award joint winner, for The Great World
- 1991: Miles Franklin Award, for The Great World
- 1991: Commonwealth Writers' Prize (South East Asia and South Pacific Region, Best Book from the Region Award), for The Great World
- 1991: Commonwealth Writers Prize, Overall Best Book Award, for The Great World
- 1991: Prix Femina Étranger, for The Great World
- 1991: Honorary doctorate from the University of Queensland
- 1992: Adelaide Festival Awards for Literature, National Fiction Award, for The Great World
- 1993: New South Wales Premier's Literary Awards, Christina Stead Prize for Fiction, for Remembering Babylon
- 1993: Booker Prize shortlist, for Remembering Babylon
- 1994: Prix Femina Étranger, for Remembering Babylon
- 1994: Commonwealth Writers Prize, South-East Asia and South Pacific Region, Best Book from the Region Award, for Remembering Babylon
- 1994: Los Angeles Times Book Prize for Fiction, for Remembering Babylon
- 1994: National Book Council Banjo Award for Fiction shortlist, for Remembering Babylon
- 1995: Prix Baudelaire (France), for Remembering Babylon
- 1996: International Dublin Literary Award, for Remembering Babylon
- 1996: The Age Book of the Year Award shortlist, for The Conversations at Curlow Creek
- 1997: Miles Franklin Award shortlist, for The Conversations at Curlow Creek
- 2000: Neustadt International Prize for Literature
- 2007: The Age Book of the Year Award for Fiction, for Every Move You Make
- 2007: The Queensland Premier's Literary Awards, Australian Short Story Collection – Arts Queensland Steele Rudd Award for Every Move You Make
- 2008: Australia-Asia Literary Award, for The Complete Stories
- 2009: Q150 Icons of Queensland for his role as an "Influential Artist", announced as part of the Q150 celebrations
- 2009: John D. Criticos Prize for Greek literature, for Ransom
- 2011: International Dublin Literary Award shortlist, for Ransom
- 2011: International Booker Prize shortlist
- 2014: Kenneth Slessor Prize for Poetry, New South Wales Premier's Literary Awards, for Earth Hour
- 2016: Australia Council Award for Lifetime Achievement in Literature

== Selected bibliography ==
=== Novels ===
- Johnno (1975)
- An Imaginary Life (1978)
- Child's Play (1981) - early editions included the short stories "Eustace" and "The Prowler"
- Fly Away Peter (1982)—known as The Bread of Time to Come in the U.S.
- Harland's Half Acre (1984)
- The Great World (1990)
- Remembering Babylon (1993)
- The Conversations at Curlow Creek (1996)
- Ransom (2009)

=== Short story collections ===
- Antipodes (1985)
- Untold Tales (1999)
- Dream Stuff (2000)
- Every Move You Make (2006)
- The Complete Stories (2007)—combines Antipodes, Dream Stuff and Every Move You Make, along with "Eustace" and "The Prowler"

=== Poetry collections ===
- Bicycle and Other Poems (1970)
- Neighbours in a Thicket: Poems (1974)
- Poems 1975–76 (1976)
- First Things Last (1980)
- Wild Lemons: Poems (1980)
- Selected Poems 1959–1989 (1992)
- Guide to the Perplexed and Other Poems (2007)
- Typewriter Music (2007)
- Revolving Days: Selected Poems (2008)
- Earth Hour (2014)
- An Open Book (2018)

=== Non-fiction ===
- 12 Edmondstone Street (1985)—memoir
- A Spirit of Play: The Making of Australian Consciousness (1998)—the ABC Boyer Lectures
- Made in England: Australia's British Inheritance (2003)—number 12 in Black Inc's Quarterly Essay series
- On Experience (2008)—in Melbourne University Press's Little Books on Big Themes series
- The Happy Life (2011)—number 41 in Black Inc's Quarterly Essay series
- The Writing Life: Book 2 (2014)

=== Plays ===
- Blood Relations (1988)

=== Libretti ===
- Voss (1986)—music by Richard Meale
- Mer de glace (1991)—music by Richard Meale
- Baa Baa Black Sheep (1993)
- Jane Eyre (2000)

=== Selected list of poems ===
Title	Year	First published	Reprinted/collected in
"The Year of the Foxes"	1969	Poetry Australia no. 28, in June 1969	Bicycle and Other Poems, University of Queensland Press, 1970, pp.1-2
