= James Cowan (author) =

Australian author

- Born: 9 April 1942; Melbourne, Australia
- Died: 6 October 2018 (aged 76); Bangalow, New South Wales, Australia
- Occupation: Writer
- Relatives: James Cowan (great grandfather)
- Writing career
- Language: English
- Notable awards: ALS Gold Medal 1998

James Cowan (9 April 1942 – 6 October 2018) was an Australian author. He was the author of a number of internationally acclaimed books, including A Troubadour's Testament and Letters from A Wild State. In 1998 he was awarded the prestigious Australian Literature Society's Gold Medal for his novel, A Mapmaker's Dream. His work has been translated into seventeen languages.

== Biography ==
Born in Melbourne, Australia, Cowan completed his studies in Sydney. His first published works were Nine Poems (Mauritius, 1964) and A Rambling Man (Sydney, 1966). In the 1960s he travelled and worked in Mauritius, Vancouver, New York, Paris and London. For some years he lived in Marrakesh, and in Libya, studying the Berber and Tuareg peoples. Returning to Australia in 1973, he decided to view his homeland as a foreign country. He made journeys throughout the continent, sometimes on horseback, exploring early European culture and its imprint on the land. This led to a succession of books, The Mountain Men, The River People, and Starlight's Trail.

In the 1990s, James spent two years living in Balgo Hills, a remote Aboriginal settlement in the Tanami Desert. From there he relocated to Cortona in Italy where he lived for three years. More recently he has been living in Buenos Aires, Argentina.

He died in Bangalow, New South Wales, on 6 October 2018 aged 76.

== Aboriginal culture ==
James Cowan then began a ten-year study of the Aboriginal culture that led him to work, study, and finally live among Aboriginal communities in the Center, the Far North and the Kimberly region. This resulted in a series of books that explored Aboriginal themes: Mysteries of the Dreaming, Myths of Dreaming, Sacred Places, The Aboriginal Tradition, Two Men Dreaming and finally Messengers of the Gods all found their inspiration in traditional cultural perspectives that the author encountered during his journeys.

To that end he made numerous trips throughout Australia, the Pacific islands, Borneo and the Celebes to deepen his understanding of how the mythic imperative works in present-day tribal societies.

A part of his commitment to improving the lives of Aboriginal Australians entailed working in Balgo Hills, in the Tanami Desert, for two years as the art coordinator in the mid-1990s. He was able to revive a moribund art center, put in place efficient business systems, raise sufficient capital for an art and cultural center, and lift artists' earnings to levels not seen in the industry before. As a result, Warlayirti Artists Cooperative fr:Warlayirti Artists is now one of the most successful Indigenous businesses in Australia.

== Literary works ==
In the 1990s Cowan turned to a more global perspective in literature. He became interested in fashioning a new prose – one that is spare, limpid, and devoid of all the old mechanisms of literary realism. This new prose is exploited in his novels A Mapmaker's Dream, A Troubadour's Testament, and more recently in his study of the Persian poet, Rumi's Divan of Shems of Tabriz. Each of these books is an attempt to re-affirm the greatness of the European and Near-Eastern traditions. Though steeped in history and imbued with a continuum between past and present, Cowan's work is thoroughly directed toward the modern.

In 2000, James Cowan returned to Australia after spending three years in Italy where he researched and wrote Francis: A Saints Way. This book became the inspiration for a new ballet devised by the Queensland Ballet Co. and performed in 2002. His latest book is Journey to the Inner Mountain, a study of St Antony of Egypt in the 3rd century, and A Spanner in the Works, a study of the impact of science and technology on contemporary spiritual life.

Institutions that the author has lectured at are: the University of Bologna in Italy, the University of Barcelona, Spain, Michigan State University MI, Grand Valley State University MI, Grand Rapids Museum MI, the Temenos Academy in London, Schumacher College in Devon, Washburn University Topeka, KS, Earthwatch in Boston, Smith College Massachusetts, the International Centre in New Delhi, the Commonwealth Club of Rome, the Australian Embassy in Madrid, the American Research Institute in Cairo, as well as in numerous institutions in Australia. Many of these lectures have been on the subject of Aboriginal life, art and culture.

His books have been published in the US, UK, Australia, Germany, France, Holland, Poland, Italy, Greece, Switzerland, Croatia, Mauritius, Spain (Spanish and Catalan), Argentina, Brazil, Korea and Japan.

Cowan's work lies at the intersection between modernism and ancient cultural perspectives. Many of his books explore the beliefs and practices of indigenous peoples as they attempt to come to terms with the modern world. His interest, too, in early monastic life throughout the Levant (Mount Athos, Sinai, Nitrea Desert), as well as the anchorites of present-day Egypt, has allowed him to draw upon their experience to invigorate language. Myth, ritual and ancient belief are essential to the author's approach to revitalising metaphors.

James Cowan was the recipient of an honorary doctorate of Humane Letters from Grand Valley State University in Michigan for his life's work. He has lectured throughout the world on themes related to his deep knowledge of traditional peoples, Aboriginal art, metaphysics, and literature.

He received a PhD from the University of Queensland for his work on Vespasiano Gonzaga and his Ideal City in Italy.

== Bibliography ==
=== Novels and short fictions ===
- A Voyage Around My Pipe (2011)
- The Deposition (2008)
- A Troubadour's Testament (1998)
- A Mapmaker's Dream (1996)
- The Painted Shore (1988)
- Toby's Angel (1975)
- A Rambling Man (1966)
- "Palace of Memory" (2018)

Editions Françaises : ( French Edition)

- Voyage autour de ma pipe (2018) - Ed Hozhoni
- Le rêve du Cartographe (2015) - Ed Hozhoni
- En Fuyant Hérode (2015) - ed Hozhoni

=== Poetry ===
- Petroglyphs: prose poems (1996)
- Terra Nullius, an eco poem (2015)
- Terra Firma, Odes IV-VI (2015)
- " Terra Filius " odes VII-IX (2017)
- " Terra Incognita" odes X (2017)

=== Non-fiction ===
- The Mountain Men (1982)
- The River People (1983)
- Starlight's Trail : Harry Redford's Epic Journey Down the Cooper (1985)
- Sacred Places in Australia (1991)
- The Element of the Aborigine Tradition (1992)
- Messengers of the Gods: Tribal Elders Reveal the Ancient Wisdom of the Earth (1993)
- Myths of the Dreaming: Interpreting Aboriginal Legends (1994)
- Two Men Dreaming: A Memoir, A Journey (1995)
- Mysteries of the Dreaming : the spiritual life of Australian Aborigines (2001)
- Journey to the Inner Mountain: In the Desert with St. Antony (2001)
- Francis: a Saint's Way (2002)
- Desert Father (2006)
- Fleeing Herod: through Egypt with the Holy Family (2013)
- Hamlet's Ghost, Life of Vespasiano Gonzaga (2015)

=== Children's literature ===
- Kun-man-gur: the Rainbow Serpent (1994)

=== Essays ===
- Letters from a Wild State (1991)
- Quartet: four essays on power (2006)
- A Spanner in the Works (2007)

=== Art monographs ===
- Wirrimanu: Aboriginal Art of the Balgo Hills (1994)
- Balgo Hills Aboriginal Paintings (1994)
- Balgo: New Directions (1999)

=== Translation ===
- Where Two Oceans Meet: A Selection of Odes from the Divan of Shems of Tabriz by Mevlana Jalaluddin Rumi
- Selections from the Divan of Shems of Tabriz
- "Warrior's of Love," Rumi's Odes to Shams of Tabriz.

=== Papers ===
- Wild Stones: Spiritual Discipline and Psychic Power among Aboriginal Clever Men (in Studies in Comparative Religion, Vol. 17, No. 1 & 2 (Winter-Spring, 1985)
