= Earth Hour (collection) =

2014 Australian poetry collection by David Malouf

- Author: David Malouf
- Language: English
- Genre: Poetry collection
- Publisher: University of Queensland Press
- Publication date: 26 February 2014
- Publication place: Australia
- Media type: Print
- Pages: 86 pp
- Awards: 2014 Queensland Premier's Literary Awards — Poetry Collection – Arts Queensland Judith Wright Calanthe Award, winner; 2015 New South Wales Premier's Literary Awards — Kenneth Slessor Prize for Poetry, winner
- ISBN: 9780702250132

Earth Hour is a collection of poems by Australian poet David Malouf, published by University of Queensland Press in 2014.

The collection contains 60 poems. Several were originally published in literary magazines or poetry anthologies, with the bulk of the poems being published here for the first time.

It was the winner of the 2014 Queensland Premier's Literary Awards — Arts Queensland Judith Wright Calanthe Prize for Poetry,, and the 2015 New South Wales Premier's Literary Awards — Kenneth Slessor Prize for Poetry.

== Contents ==
- "Aquarius"
- "Radiance"
- "Retrospect"
- "Toccata"
- "Dot Poem, the Connections"
- "Footloose, a Senior Moment"
- "Entreaty"
- "Whistling in the Dark"
- "Ladybird"
- "Touching the Earth"
- "The Spell"
- "After"
- "Inner City"
- "An Aside on the Sublime"
- "Sky News"
- "Trees"
- "Rondeau II, Pop Song"
- "Odes I, xxvii"
- "Odes II, ii"
- "Spleen"
- "A Parting Word"
- "The Brothers : Morphine & Death"
- "Long Story Short"
- "Ghost Town"
- "Writers's Retreat : Maclaren Vale, 2010"
- "Persimmons : Campagnatico"
- "A Recollection of Starlings : Rome '84"
- "Windows"
- "Nightsong, Nightlong"
- "Eternal Moment at Poggio Madonna"
- "The Cup"
- "Towards Midnight"
- "The Rapture"
- "At Laterina (a Birthday Poem for Jeffrey Smart)"
- "All Souls"
- "Earth Hour"
- "Good Friday, Flying West"
- "The Far View"
- "Haystacks"
- "Blenheim Park"
- "Cuisine"
- "At Skara Brae"
- "A Green Miscellany"
- "Sunken Garden"
- "The Bird-cages in Angel Place"
- "Dog Park"
- "The Worm's-Eye View"
- "Night Poem"
- "Shy Gifts"
- "Still Life"
- "The Deluge"
- "Abstract"
- "Seven Faces of the Die"
- "At Hazard"
- "A Touch of the Sun"
- "Shadow Play"
- "Australia Day at Pennyroyal"
- "Aquarius II"
- "Toccata II"
- "At Lerici"

== Critical reception ==
In The Age newspaper, critic Peter Craven was full of praise for the collection calling it "a beautiful, spacious volume that will repay re-reading not simply because it is – with a characteristic Maloufian lightness of touch – preoccupied, every so often, with last things, but because it shows, as his prose always does, how good an ear he has as a writer."

Reviewing the book for Australian Book Review Lisa Gorton noted that this is "consciously a late collection", pointing out that the author was approaching the age of eighty as he published this. Gorton went on to state that "Earth Hour returns to the places of Malouf's earliest poems: rooms and gardens...The sense of place that he discovered in those early poems sustains his poetry still. It is remarkable how early he discovered his nature as a writer, how early he discovered those themes that would sustain him throughout his writing life."

== Awards ==
- 2014 Queensland Premier's Literary Awards — Arts Queensland Judith Wright Calanthe Prize for Poetry, winner
- 2015 New South Wales Premier's Literary Awards — Kenneth Slessor Prize for Poetry, winner
- 2015 Prime Minister's Literary Awards — Poetry, shortlisted
- 2015 ALS Gold Medal, shortlisted
- 2016 Western Australian Premier's Book Awards — Poetry, shortlisted

== Notes ==
- At Adelaide Writers' Week in 2014 David Malouf was interviewed by Mike Ladd. That interviewed was recorded by the ABC.
- Ivor Indyk delivered a keynote adddress at the event 'David Malouf: Celebrating a Life in Letters', in honour of the author's eightieth birthday, at the State Library of Queensland, 6–7 June 2014. Indyk referred extensively to poems in this collection during that address.

== See also ==
- 2014 in Australian literature
