= Neighbours in a Thicket =

Collected poems by David Malouf

Neighbours in a Thicket : Poems
- First edition
- Author: David Malouf
- Language: English
- Genre: poetry collection
- Publisher: University of Queensland Press
- Publication date: 1974
- Publication place: Australia
- Media type: Print
- Pages: 65 pp
- ISBN: 0702209279
- Preceded by: Bicycle and Other Poems
- Followed by: Poems (1975–76)

Neighbours in a Thicket : Poems (1974) is the second poetry collection by Australian poet and author David Malouf. It won the ALS Gold Medal, the Grace Leven Prize for Poetry, and the Colin Roderick Award, all in 1974.

The collection consists of 34 poems, all of which are published for the first time in this volume.

== Contents ==
- "Asphodel"
- "Adrift"
- "Confessions of an Only Child"
- "Early Discoveries"
- "Evergreen"
- "Intimations"
- "An Ordinary Evening at Hamilton"
- "At Deception Bay"
- "Episode from an Early War"
- "With the Earlier Deaths"
- "Decade's End"
- "Notes on an Undiscovered Continent"
- "Mythologies"
- "A Charm Against the Dumps"
- "The Little Aeneid"
- "Among the Ruins"
- "After Baedeker"
- "Eternal City"
- "In the Grand Manner"
- "News from the Dark Ages"
- "Bad Dreams in Vienna"
- "In the Pinewood"
- "Off the Highway"
- "Report from Champagne Country"
- "Orangerie"
- "Before the Revolution"
- "Albumblatt"
- "A Poet Among Others"
- "At Ravenna"
- "Reading Horace Outside Sydney, 1970"
- "Stooping to Drink"
- "Off the Map"
- "Pieces for a Northern Winter"
- "A Gathering"

== Critical reception ==
Geoffrey Page in The Canberra Times noted the one thing all reviewers of the book "seem agreed on is the sophistication and depth of Malouf's poems about Europe. There is no other Australian poet who has such a feeling for its history, its essential character, its actual soil." But this was not to diminish "its distinct Australian quality. Although the section of European poems in the middle of the book seems to be its core the majority of the poems are in fact located in Australia - and are in no way inferior. Malouf's Australia is a place where the legendary, the extravagant are inextricably linked to hard reality. Beneath the service stations is the mythical swamp of his childhood: not far beyond our everyday Australia is the Great South Land which fired the European imagination for centuries (and in which Malouf can still see the magic)."

== Awards ==
- 1974 – Grace Leven Prize for Poetry winner
- 1974 – Townsville Foundation for Australian Literary Studies Award winner
- 1974 – ALS Gold Medal winner
- 1974 – Colin Roderick Award winner

== See also ==
- 1974 in Australian literature
- 1974 in poetry
