= Beverley Farmer =

Australian novelist and short story writer

- Born: Beverley Anne Farmer; 7 February 1941; Windsor, Victoria, Australia
- Died: 16 April 2018 (aged 77)
- Occupations: Novelist and short story writer
- Writing career
- Language: English
- Years active: 1968-2017
- Notable awards: New South Wales Premier's Literary Awards — Christina Stead Prize for Fiction

Beverley Anne Farmer (also known as B. Christou) (7 February 1941 – 16 April 2018) was an Australian novelist and short story writer.

== Personal life ==
Beverley Farmer was born in Melbourne. She was educated at Mac.Robertson Girls' High School and at the University of Melbourne, where she graduated with a BA in 1960.

She worked in various jobs, mainly secondary-school teaching and running a restaurant, before becoming a professional writer. She was married to a Greek migrant, Christos Talihmanidis, for thirteen years 1965-78, three of them spent in Greece. They returned to Australia for their son to be born in 1972 and they were subsequently divorced.

Farmer's autobiographical novella Alone (1980) reworked a story which had appeared in Westerly (1968). It was published by the firm of Sisters and "gives a sensitive portrayal of the breakup of a lesbian relationship." While she is best known for her fiction, Farmer also wrote essays, poetry, reviews and criticism. Her writing appeared in several magazines, journals and newspapers, including Overland, Westerly, Meanjin, Island Magazine, and The Bulletin.

Loss features as a central theme in Farmer's stories. She described it as the "touchstone" of her work. The "experience of being foreign" was also favoured. Several stories in her 1985 book Home Time show growing awareness of the relation between life and fiction, writers and readers. She was an admirer of her fellow Australian novelist Marjorie Barnard.

Beverley Farmer died on 16 April 2018, aged 77.

== Awards and nominations ==
- 1984 – New South Wales Premier's Literary Awards, Christina Stead Prize for Fiction for Milk
- 1996 – The House in the Light was shortlisted for the Miles Franklin Award
- 2009 – Patrick White Award
- 2018 – This Water was long-listed for The Stella Prize

== Selected works ==
=== Short story anthologies ===
- Snake (1982)
- Milk (1983)
- Home Time (1985)
- Collected Stories (1987)
- This Water: Five Tales (2017)

=== Novellas ===
- Alone (1980)
- The Seal Woman (1992)
- The House in the Light (1995)

=== Other ===
- A Body of Water: A Year's Notebook (1990)
- The Bone House (2005)
