= Twenty-Three (short story collection) =

1962 collection of short stories by John Morrison

Twenty-Three: Stories
- First edition
- Author: John Morrison
- Language: English
- Publisher: Australasian Book Society
- Publication date: 1962
- Publication place: Australia
- Media type: Print (hardback)
- Pages: 212
- Preceded by: Poems
- Followed by: Black Cargo and Other Stories

Twenty-Three: Stories (1962) is the third collection of short stories by Australian author John Morrison. It won the ALS Gold Medal in 1963.

The collection consists of 23 stories, with several appearing here for the first time. The stories are taken from Morrison's writing from the 1950s and early 1960s, with the earliest having been published for the first time in 1950, and the latest, originally in this collection, in 1962.

== Contents ==
- "The Ticket"
- "To Margaret"
- "A Man's World"
- "This Freedom"
- "The Hold Up"
- "At This Very Moment"
- "The Last Three Years"
- "The Children"
- "Bo Abbott"
- "Goyai"
- "The Lonely One"
- "Black Night in Collingwood"
- "It Opens Your Eyes"
- "The Man on the Bidgee"
- "The Drunk"
- "To Kill a Snake"
- "Dog-Box"
- "The Judge and the Shipowner"
- "Morning Glory"
- "All I Ask"
- "Way of Life"
- "Sydney or the Bush"
- "Ward Four"

== Critical reception ==
Judah Waten, in his survey of Australian fiction of 1962, in Realist Writer stated: "Twenty Three stories by John Morrison has added to his already considerable fame as a short story writer. It was widely reviewed in the press and even right-wing critics have conceded that these stories are authentic pictures of Australian life. This collection includes such outstanding stories as "Bo Abbott," a study of a militant waterside worker and "Morning Glory," a picture of the bourgeois mentality which places property above life."

== See also ==
- 1962 in literature
