= Past the Shallows =

Book by Favel Parrett

- First edition
- Author: Favel Parrett
- Language: English
- Genre: novel
- Publisher: Hachette, Australia
- Publication date: 2011
- Publication place: Australia
- Media type: Print (Paperback)
- Pages: 251
- ISBN: 9780733626579
- Followed by: When the Night Comes

Past the Shallows (2011) is a novel by Australian author Favel Parrett. It was shortlisted for the 2012 Miles Franklin Award. It has been published in Australia, the UK, the US, Germany and Italy. Past the Shallows has also been used as a prescribed text for HSC students.

== Plot summary ==
Past the Shallows is a novel of the bond of brotherhood and the fragility of youth. This is the story of three brothers growing up in a fractured and quite dysfunctional family on the wild coast of Tasmania. The consequences of their parents' choices shape their lives and ultimately bring tragedy to them all. Harry and Miles live with their father, an abalone fisherman, on the south-east coast of Tasmania. With their mum dead, they are left to look after themselves. When Miles isn't helping out on the boat, Miles and his older brother, Joe explore the coast. Joe and Miles both love to surf, however Harry is afraid of the water. Everyday their dad battles the unpredictable ocean to make a living. He is a hard man, a bitter drinker who harbours a devastating secret that is destroying him. Unlike Joe, Harry and Miles are too young to leave home and so are forced to live with their abusive father. Harry, the youngest, is the most vulnerable and is targeted as an outlet for the fathers anger.

== Notes ==
- Dedication: To Linda - for always listening.
- Epigraph: "It would be vain of me to attempt to describe my feelings when beheld this lonely harbour lying at the world's end, separated as it were from the rest of the universe - 'twas nature and nature in her wildest mood..." - Admiral D'Entrecasteaux, 1792

== Reviews ==
- Juliette Hughes in The Sydney Morning Herald found the novel "an impressive debut" with the author having "a real voice, with power to evoke feeling, place and character." Louise Swinn in The Australian noted that the book "is a harrowing tale that doesn't shy from the brutal reality at the thin end of the economy". She went on to say that the book was 'clearly the work of a talented new novelist.'
- Praise for the work–
  - 'finely crafted literary novel ... genuinely moving and fill of heart' The Age
  - 'a small gem of a story' Who Weekly
  - 'a rare work of fiction' Good Reading
  - 'So real, so true - this novel sweeps you away in its tide' Robert Drewe

== Awards and nominations ==
- 2012 shortlisted Miles Franklin Award
- 2012 Winner Dobbie Encouragement Award
- 2012 Winner Newcomer of the Year, Australian Book Industry Awards (ABIA)
- 2012 shortlisted Indie Awards — Debut Fiction
- 2012 longlisted ASAL Awards — ALS Gold Medal
- 2012 shortlisted Australian Book Industry Awards (ABIA) — Australian Literary Fiction Book of the Year
- 2013 longlisted International Dublin Literary Award
