= Ransom (Malouf novel) =

2009 novel by David Malouf

- First edition
- Author: David Malouf
- Language: English
- Publisher: Chatto & Windus
- Publication date: 2009
- Publication place: Australia
- Media type: Print (Hardcover)
- Pages: 230
- ISBN: 0099539527

Ransom (2009) is a novel by Australian author David Malouf. It retells the story of the Iliad from books 22 to 24.

== Summary ==
This story begins with Achilles mourning the death of Patroclus (who is described as his kinsman, cousin or lover in various books and films) during the Trojan War. Achilles, enraged at his friend's death, slays Hector, Patroclus' killer, and drags Hector's corpse behind a chariot around the walls of Troy and Patroclus' funeral pyre for the next ten days. This causes much dismay to the Trojans and his own men, as it is an unprecedented act of barbarism, and is made worse by the ancient belief held by both Greeks and Trojans that Hector's soul cannot pass into the afterlife unless it is given a proper burial, something that Achilles refuses to allow.

The narrative shifts from Achilles to Priam, Hector's father, and the King of Troy. Priam cannot stand the abuse of his beloved son's body, and (prompted by the messenger-goddess Iris in a dream) decides that he will approach Achilles without his royal decorations, mortal to mortal, and attempt to ransom Hector's body back with the better part of the Trojan treasury.

When Priam explains his plan to his family and advisors, it is met with resistance. After recruiting a common cart driver, Somax, from the market square, Priam and his driver set out for the Greek camp. With guidance from the god of travellers, Hermes, Priam eventually meets Achilles at his camp.

Priam appeals to Achilles's conscience, reminding him of his own father and son (here Malouf juxtaposes Priam's grief at the death of his son and Achilles' grief at Patroclus' death), in trying to persuade him to return Hector to Troy for a proper burial. Achilles (partly due to the nostalgia stirred up when he mistakes Priam for his own father, Peleus) agrees, and the exchange is made. The story ends with a flash forward to Priams' inglorious death at the hands of Achilles' son, Neoptolemus.

Years later, when Troy has fallen to the Greeks, an elderly Somax retells his story, highlighting the story as one of the major themes of the book.

== Differences from the Iliad ==
There are several textual differences between the Iliad and Ransom. The character Somax, who drives the cart Priam rides en route to his negotiations with Achilles, is not mentioned in the original text. This leads to a drastically different interaction with Hermes in Ransom. Priam and Achilles are covered in much more detail in Ransom, leading to further textual differences.

== Critical reception ==
Ransom was shortlisted for the 2011 International Dublin Literary Award. It received the 2009 John D. Criticos Prize for Greek literature. The book received positive reviews from the New York Times Book Review, the Dallas Morning News, the New Yorker, the San Francisco Chronicle, the Washington Post, the Los Angeles Times, the Boston Globe, and the Wall Street Journal and many other publications
