= Every Move You Make (collection) =

2006 short story collection by Australian author David Malouf

- Author: David Malouf
- Language: English
- Genre: Short story collection
- Publisher: Chatto and Windus
- Publication date: 2006
- Publication place: Australia
- Media type: Print
- Pages: 244 pp.
- Awards: 2007 The Age Book of the Year Award – Fiction, winner
- ISBN: 9780701180485

Every Move You Make is a 2006 short story collection by the Australian author David Malouf originally published by Chatto and Windus.

It was the winner of the 2007 The Age Book of the Year Award – Fiction, and the 2007 Steele Rudd Award.

== Contents ==
- "The Valley of Lagoons"
- "Every Move You Make"
- "War Baby"
- "Towards Midnight"
- "Elsewhere"
- "Mrs Porter and the Rock"
- "The Domestic Cantata"

== Critical reception ==
Reviewing the collection for M/C Reviews Maggie Ball wrote: "His plots move easily with characters all developing forward, but it is the collective meaning created by a glimpse at something beyond the prose that makes these stories so powerful. Every Move You Make is a collection of stories that are as important as they are pleasurable, and should not be missed."

James Ley in Australian Book Review noted that Malouf "has a strong sense of the way the most mundane object can embody the past, how its shape or texture can send us back to a specific time and place and mood." He went on to state that he is "also a writer whose imagination is exercised by broad cultural forces that shape national identity. The characters in Every Move You Make are all products of their environment, regardless of whether they choose to accept or reject inherited expectations."

== See also ==
- 2006 in Australian literature

== Notes ==
- Epigraph: When I consider the brevity of my life, swallowed up as it is in the eternity that precedes and will follow it, the tiny space I occupy and what is visible to me...- Pascal, Pensees.

== Awards ==
- 2007 The Age Book of the Year Award – Fiction, winner
- 2007 Queensland Premier's Literary Awards, Australian Short Story Collection – Arts Queensland Steele Rudd Award
