= Every Breath You Take (disambiguation) =

"Every Breath You Take" is a 1983 song by the Police.

Every Breath You Take may also refer to:

- Every Breath You Take: The Singles, a 1986 compilation album by the Police
- Every Breath You Take (film), a 2021 psychological thriller
- Every Breath U Take, a 2012 Filipino romantic comedy film
- "Every Breath You Take" (Missing You), a 2025 television episode
- "Every Breath You Take" (Waking the Dead), a 2001 television episode
