= Locust Girl: A Lovesong =

2015 novel by Australian author Merlinda Bobis

- Author: Merlinda Bobis
- Language: English
- Genre: Fantasy novel
- Publisher: Spinifex Press
- Publication date: August 2015
- Publication place: Australia
- Media type: Print
- Pages: 179 pp.
- Awards: 2016 New South Wales Premier's Literary Awards — Christina Stead Prize for Fiction, winner
- ISBN: 9781742199597

Locust Girl: A Lovesong is a 2015 fantasy novel by the Australian author Merlinda Bobis originally published by Spinifex Press.

It was the winner of the 2016 New South Wales Premier's Literary Awards, Christina Stead Prize for Fiction.

== Synopsis ==
In a post-apocalyptic world the stars have gone out. When her village in the desert is bombed, Amadea is buried alive, only to be resurrected some ten years later with a locust attached to her forehead.

== Critical reception ==
Writing in The Sydney Morning Herald, Lucy Sussex noted that Bobis is "one of those interesting and rare writers who mix the fantastical with the political." She also states that this is a fantasy novel, not of the Tolkien variety but one of Bobis's own making. "Bobis provides the reader with a quest, a coming-of-age story, but overwhelmingly a political allegory. It is our world presented here, curiously refracted to present something akin to the film Fantastic Planet."

Emily Yu Zong found the novel to be an interesting mix in her review for: "Combining elements of the uncanny, the fable, the post-apocalyptic, and popular fiction, this novel's genre is hybrid. As Bobis blurs the boundaries between a utopian and a dystopian society, she touches on the social malaise, cultural discomfort, and ecological concerns of our globalised times."

== Notes ==
- Dedication: For those walking to the border for dear life/And for those guarding the border for dear life.

== Awards ==
- 2016 New South Wales Premier's Literary Awards – Christina Stead Prize for Fiction, winner

== See also ==
- 2015 in Australian literature
