= The Golden Gander =

1935 play by Henry C. James and Keith Bean

The Golden Gander is a 1935 Australia play by Henry C. James and Keith Bean about gold seekers in central Australia. It was presented on the West End at a time when that was rare for Australian plays.

It was originally known as The Golden Goose and debuted in 1935 at the Croydon Theatre with Pat Hanna and Coral Brown.

The play received mixed reviews and was not a success. However star Coral Brown was well received.

Reviewing the London production, Leslie Rees said "Any Australian watching the stage must have felt that Mr. James... had squandered one of the most forceful and imaginative of potential Australian themes in inadmissible anticlimax...Mr. James's piece, with its character-types borrowed from the theatrical wardrobe, instead of being observed from life itself, rang cheaply, like a mouth organ played against a symphony orchestra."

== Background ==
Brisbane journalist Keith Bean bought the news rights of Charles Chapman's expedition to The Granites in 1932. Bean fell ill then sent Henry C James to the desert. Both went to London, met accidentally, and collaborated on the play.
