= Laura McPhee-Browne =

Australian author

- Occupation: Writer

Laura McPhee-Browne is an Australian writer and social worker from Melbourne. She has authored two novels – Cherry Beach (2020) and Little Plum (2023) – as well as many short stories and essays. Her essays have appeared in The Saturday Paper, Kill Your Darlings, Island, Meanjin and Overland.

In 2016, two of McPhee-Browne's short stories received high commendations: "The Surprise" in the inaugural Hope Prize awards and "The Tallest Girl in the World" in the Rachel Funari Prize for Fiction.

McPhee-Browne's first novel, Cherry Beach, won the 2021 UTS Glenda Adams Award for New Writing category of the New South Wales Premier's Literary Awards. It was also shortlisted for the Fiction prize at the Adelaide Festival Awards for Literature in 2022.

Beyond writing, McPhee-Browne is a social worker and perinatal counsellor, roles that helped the writing of her second novel, Little Plum. Her third novel, Worry Doll, was published in 2026.

== Books ==
- Cherry Beach. Text Publishing. 2020. ISBN 978-1-922-26850-1.
- Little Plum. Text Publishing. 2023. ISBN 978-1-922-79006-4.
- Worry Doll. Text Publishing. 2026. ISBN 978-1-761-38185-0.
