= Beautiful Revolutionary =

- Author: Laura Elizabeth Woollett
- Language: English
- Genre: Historical fiction
- Publisher: Scribe
- Publication date: 2018
- Publication place: Australia
- ISBN: 1925548953
- OCLC: 1045563024

Beautiful Revolutionary is a historical fiction novel written by Australian author Laura Elizabeth Woollett. The novel follows a young married couple, Evelyn and Lenny Lynden, as they become involved with Jim Jones and the Peoples Temple. The characters of Evelyn and Lenny were based on Carolyn Moore Layton and Larry Layton.

== Reception ==
Kirkus Reviews called it "weighty and disquieting" and stated: "History blends with mythology, creating a dizzying effect in which a reader, too, will be searching for something to ground them." Xan Brooks of The Guardian called it a "supple, punchy debut novel" that "paints a vivid portrait of life inside the Peoples Temple." Carol Gladstein of Booklist wrote that Woollett "turns a dark chapter in U.S. history into a deeply human, satisfying read for fans of Emma Cline's The Girls (2016)." Ella Jeffrey of the Mascara Literary Review wrote that Wollett's "complex blending of history and fiction is grounded in extensive research; her nuanced ability to make judicious, unromanticised and unpretentious decisions about where the history in her novel ends and her fictionalisations begin makes this a captivating, original novel."

Katherine Hill of Alternative Considerations of Jonestown & Peoples Temple, a project of the San Diego State University, called the novel the "hands-down the best" fictional work on the subject that she had read, opining that Woollett is a "gifted writer whose work engages the reader and keeps them turning the page." However, she questioned its historical accuracy and concluded: "The key is for people to accept it for what it is – a novel – rather than an historical account. If people read Beautiful Revolutionary, they may very well get sucked into the Jonestown Vortex that brought Laura Elizabeth Woollett to write her novel in the first place." Carole Cusack of Nova Religio opined that while Woollett "writes well, and for this reader, the novel is interesting and compelling, up to a point", the characterisation of Evelyn is "inexplicable" and the novel is ultimately not "deeply moving or convincing" as a result. However, Cusack considered the novel a "substantial achievement" and hoped that readers unfamiliar with Jonestown "may even be prompted to investigate the documentary history of Peoples Temple."
