= Fiona McFarlane =

Australian author (born 1978)

- Born: 1978 (age 47–48); Sydney, Australia
- Occupation: Author
- Notable work: The Night Guest (2013); The High Places (2016); Highway 13 (2024)

Fiona McFarlane (born 1978) is an Australian author, best known for her novel The Night Guest (2013) and her collections of short stories The High Places (2016) and Highway 13 (2024). She is a recipient of the Voss Literary Prize, the UTS Glenda Adams Award for New Writing at the New South Wales Premier's Literary Awards, the Dylan Thomas Prize, and the Nita Kibble Literary Award.

== Life and career ==
McFarlane was born in Sydney, Australia in 1978. She studied English at the University of Sydney, the University of Cambridge and the University of Texas at Austin.

Her debut novel, The Night Guest, was published in 2013 and is about a retired widow with dementia who lives alone. It won the Voss Literary Prize and the UTS Glenda Adams Award for New Writing at the New South Wales Premier's Literary Awards. It was also shortlisted for the Miles Franklin Award, the Stella Prize and the Guardian First Book Award.

In 2017, McFarlane won the Dylan Thomas Prize for her collection of short stories, The High Places.

She was shortlisted for the Fiction Book Award at the 2023 Queensland Literary Awards and for the Fiction Award at the 2023 Prime Minister's Literary Awards for The Sun Walks Down (2022).

In 2025, her short story collection Highway 13 won The Story Prize.

McFarlane's writing has also appeared in Zoetrope: All-Story, Southerly and The New Yorker.

== Literary ==
Year	Title	Award	Category	Result	Ref.
2013	The Night Guest	Los Angeles Times Book Prize	Art Seidenbaum Award for First Fiction	Shortlisted	
2014	The Night Guest	Australian Book Industry Awards	Literary Fiction	Shortlisted	
2014	The Night Guest	Barbara Jefferis Award	—	Won	
2014	The Night Guest	Guardian First Book Award	—	Shortlisted	
2014	The Night Guest	Indie Book Awards	Debut Fiction	Shortlisted	
2014	The Night Guest	Miles Franklin Award	—	Shortlisted	
2014	The Night Guest	New South Wales Premier's Literary Awards	UTS Glenda Adams Award	Shortlisted	
2014	The Night Guest	Nita Kibble Literary Awards	Dobbie Literary Award	Shortlisted	
2014	The Night Guest	Prime Minister's Literary Awards	Fiction	Shortlisted	
2014	The Night Guest	The Readings Prize	—	Shortlisted	
2014	The Night Guest	Stella Prize	—	Shortlisted	
2014	The Night Guest	Voss Literary Prize	—	Won	
2016	The High Places	Queensland Literary Awards	Short Story Collection	Won	
2017	The High Places	ALS Gold Medal	—	Longlisted	
2017	The High Places	Dylan Thomas Prize	—	Won	
2017	The High Places	Stella Prize	—	Longlisted	
2018	The High Places	Nita Kibble Literary Awards	Nita B Kibble Literary Award	Won	
2023	The Sun Walks Down	The Age Book of the Year Awards	Fiction	Shortlisted	
2023	The Sun Walks Down	ARA Historical Novel Prize	Adult	Longlisted	
2023	The Sun Walks Down	Australian Book Industry Awards	Literary Fiction	Shortlisted	
2023	The Sun Walks Down	Indie Book Awards	Fiction	Longlisted	
2023	The Sun Walks Down	Prime Minister's Literary Awards	Fiction	Shortlisted	
2023	The Sun Walks Down	Walter Scott Prize	—	Shortlisted	
2024	The Sun Walks Down	New South Wales Premier's Literary Awards	Christina Stead Prize for Fiction	Shortlisted	
2024	The Sun Walks Down	New South Wales Premier's Literary Awards	People's Choice Award	Shortlisted	
2025	Highway 13	The Story Prize	—	Won	
2025	Highway 13	Victorian Premier's Literary Awards	Fiction	Won	
2025	Highway 13	New South Wales Premier's Literary Awards	Christina Stead Prize for Fiction	Won	
2025	Highway 13	Miles Franklin Award	—	Shortlisted	
2025	Highway 13	ALS Gold Medal	—	Won	
2025	Highway 13	Prime Minister's Literary Awards	Fiction	Shortlisted	
2025	Highway 13	Voss Literary Prize	—	Longlisted	

== Bibliography ==
=== Novels ===
- —— (2013). The Night Guest. Penguin Group (Australia). ISBN 9781926428550.
- —— (2022). The Sun Walks Down. Allen & Unwin. ISBN 9781761185427.

=== Collections of short stories ===
- —— (2016). The High Places. Hamish Hamilton, an imprint of Penguin Books. ISBN 9781926428567.
- —— (2024). Highway 13. Farrar, Straus and Giroux. ISBN 9780374606268.

=== Short stories in anthologies ===
- Kennedy, Cate, ed. (2010). "The Movie People". The Best Australian Stories 2010. Black Inc. ISBN 9781863954952.
- Tuffield, Aviva, ed. (22 November 2010). "Exotic Animal Medicine". New Australian Stories 2. Scribe (published 2010). ISBN 9781921640865.
- Adelaide, Debra, ed. (June 2015). "I Will Tell You Something". The Simple Act of Reading. Vintage Books (published 2015). ISBN 9780857986245.
- Wood, Charlotte, ed. (7 November 2016). "Good News for Modern Man". The Best Australian Stories 2016. Black Inc (published 2016). ISBN 9781863958868.
- Furman, Laura; Bradley, David (writer of supplementary textual content.); McCracken, Elizabeth (writer of supplementary textual content.); Watson, Brad (writer of supplementary textual content.) (5 September 2017). "Buttony". The O. Henry Prize Stories 2017. New York Anchor Books (published 2017). ISBN 9780525432500.

=== Online short stories ===
- "Art Appreciation" – published in The New Yorker on May 6, 2013
- "Buttony" – published in The New Yorker on February 29, 2016
- "Demolition" – published in The New Yorker on May 25, 2020
