= Milk (short story collection) =

Short story collection by Beverley Farmer

- Author: Beverley Farmer
- Language: English
- Publisher: McPhee Gribble
- Publication date: 1983
- Publication place: Australia
- Media type: Print
- Pages: 178 pp
- ISBN: 0140071849
- Preceded by: Snake
- Followed by: Home Time

Milk (1983) is a collection of short stories by Australian writer Beverley Farmer. It was published by McPhee Gribble in 1983.

The collection includes 15 stories by the author from a variety of sources.

== Contents ==
- "Milk"
- "Melpo"
- "Sally's Birthday"
- "Saint Kay's Day"
- "At the Airport"
- "Ismini"
- "Darling Odile"
- "Gerontissa"
- "Snake"
- "Pumpkin"
- "Summer on Ice"
- "Inheritance"
- "The Captain's House"
- "Woman in a Mirror"
- "Maria's Girl"

== Dedication ==
- "All of us are passing through no matter where we go...." Stratis Myrivilis, The Mermaid Madonna

== Critical reception ==
Writing in The Canberra Times reviewer Susan McKernan noted: "Farmer is a sensual writer — she describes food, the feel of sand or ice or sex, sunsets and sunrises, with a poet's understanding. Sometimes her ability to convey sensual experience is disturbing and even nauseating — as in her description of how it feels to have cancer of the cervix."

== Publication history ==
After its original publication in 1983 the collection was reprinted by McPhee Gribble in 1990.

== Awards ==
The collection won the New South Wales Premier's Literary Awards, Christina Stead Prize for Fiction in 1984.

== See also ==
- 1983 in Australian literature
