= Every Step You Take =

Every Step You Take may refer to:

- Every Step You Take (The Unit), an episode of The Unit
- Every Step You Take (TV series), a 2015 Hong Kong television series
