= Highway 13 (story collection) =

2024 novel by Australian author Fiona McFarlane

- Author: Fiona McFarlane
- Language: English
- Genre: Crime short story collection
- Publisher: Allen & Unwin
- Publication date: 30 July 2024
- Publication place: Australia
- Media type: Print
- Pages: 320 pp.
- Awards: 2025 Victorian Premier's Prize for Fiction, winner 2025 Christina Stead Prize for FIction, winner 2025 ALS Gold Medal, winner
- ISBN: 9781761067013

Highway 13 is a 2024 collection of crime stories by the Australian author Fiona McFarlane.

It was the 2025 winner of the Victorian Premier's Prize for Fiction, the Christina Stead Prize for Fiction and the ALS Gold Medal. It was also shortlisted for that year's Miles Franklin Award and the Prime Minister's Literary Award for Fiction.

== Synopsis ==
This collection features 12 stories that explore a series of murders committed by a character named Paul Biga, although he and his crimes are never examined directly. Instead the stories look at the ripple effects these crimes have on people and places, houses and buildings.

== Critical reception ==
In The Guardian Fiona Wright notes that "McFarlane is a skilled creator of atmosphere and intensity, captured both in the vivid sense of place that all of these stories share and in the remarkable imagistic fragments of memory that her characters relate." She goes on to comment: "Despite the horror of the crimes that link them, and the sense of dread that this inevitably evokes in many of them, these are not, by and large, dark stories – they are as much about resilience, desire, yearning and love as they are about grief and danger."

Writing for The Conversation reviewer Monique Rooney introduces the author as being "known for her gripping narratives of psychological complexity and haunted Australian spaces." She concludes "McFarlane's Highway 13 is a thrilling collection that explores an uncanny restlessness haunting the Australian psyche. Its crystalline prose and keen observations about everyday life open up new ways of thinking about the historical crimes that underpin our collective unsettlement."

== See also ==
- 2024 in Australian literature

== Notes ==
- Epigraph: "Each substance of a grief hath twenty shadows."

== Awards ==
- 2025 Victorian Premier's Prize for Fiction, winner
- 2025 The Story Prize, winner
- 2025 New South Wales Premier's Literary Awards, Christina Stead Prize for Fiction, winner
- 2025 ALS Gold Medal, winner
- 2025 Miles Franklin Award, shortlisted
- 2025 Prime Minister's Literary Award for Fiction, shortlisted
- 2025 Voss Literary Prize, winner
