= Earth's Quality =

Book by Winifred Birkett

- First edition
- Author: Winifred Birkett
- Language: English
- Genre: Novel
- Publisher: Angus and Robertson, Australia
- Publication date: 1935
- Publication place: Australia
- Media type: Print
- Pages: 262
- Preceded by: Three Goats on a Bender
- Followed by: Portrait of Lucy

Earth's Quality (1935) is a novel by Australian author Winifred Birkett. It won the ALS Gold Medal for Best Novel in 1935.

== Plot summary ==
Set on a sheep station in the Yass district of New South Wales, the novel tells the story of the Waldron family. The owner John is partially paralysed and forced to cede control of his beloved Laverock station to his nephew, which ends badly.

== Reviews ==
On the original publication of the novel a reviewer in The Sydney Mail stated: "It is undoubtedly one of the best and most effectively written Australian novels that has yet appeared. It has humour, as one might expect from the author of Three Goats on a Bender; it has beauty of phrase and word, as is natural from a pen that has produced verse of no mean order; but it has also that insight, sincerity, and power without which no story, however good, can really 'live' in the world of letters. This is high praise; but Earth's Quality deserves it, and no critic worthy of the name can come across so rightful an opportunity of expressing his delight without seizing that opportunity with joy and alacrity."

A reviewer in The Age was a little more critical: "Miss Birkett is not very successful in portraying woman characters, and her story is somewhat bare of incident, but the literary quality of her book lifts it much above the level of most Australian novels."

== Awards and nominations ==
- 1935 winner ALS Gold Medal
