= Kate Jennings =

Australian poet, essayist, memoirist and novelist (1948–2021)

- Born: Catherine Ruth Jennings; 20 May 1948; Temora, New South Wales, Australia
- Died: 1 May 2021 (aged 72); New York City, New York, U.S.
- Education: University of Sydney
- Occupations: Poet; writer; essayist; memoirist; novelist
- Spouse: Bob Cato (m. 1987; died 1999)
- Writing career
- Years active: 1970–2021
- Notable work: Moral Hazard
- Notable awards: Various (see below)

Catherine Ruth Jennings (20 May 1948 – 1 May 2021) was an Australian poet, essayist, memoirist, and novelist.

== Biography ==
Born at Temora, Jennings grew up on a farm near Griffith, New South Wales. She attended the University of Sydney in the late 1960s, graduating with a Bachelor of Arts degree with honours. She was active in feminist and left wing-movements, in particular gaining notoriety for an incendiary speech given before a Vietnam Moratorium march in 1970 – a speech that is credited with signalling the beginning of the second wave of feminism in Australia.

She also edited Mother I'm Rooted, an anthology of women poets which was the object of much controversy.

She moved to New York City in 1979, where she wrote for numerous magazines and newspapers, in addition to a stint on Wall Street as a speechwriter.

=== Personal life and death ===
In 1983, Jennings met Bob Cato, a graphic designer, photographer, and collagist who helped turn the record album into an important form of contemporary art. They were married in 1987; he died in March 1999.

Jennings died on 1 May 2021, in New York.

== Works ==
Her poetry and short stories were well received, but she came into her own with her novels. Her first, Snake was described variously as "lethal and fast-moving" (Publishers Weekly), "a narrative of pure anguish" (The Times Literary Supplement), and "possessing a holographic shimmer" (The New York Times Book Review). It was reported to have just missed the Booker Prize shortlist. Moral Hazard has been called "humane and unsparing; witty, unsettling, and wildly intelligent" by Shirley Hazzard, author of The Transit of Venus.

Jennings was awarded the Christina Stead Prize for fiction for Moral Hazard, which was also shortlisted for the 2003 Miles Franklin Award, the Los Angeles Times Fiction Prize, and the Tasmania Pacific Region Prize. Snake was a New York Times Notable Book of the Year, as was Moral Hazard.

Both books contain strong autobiographical elements, Snake being about a girl growing up on a Riverina farm in the 1950s, and Moral Hazard about a couple facing Alzheimer's in the husband while the wife works as a speechwriter on Wall Street.

In 2008, she published Stanley and Sophie, a memoir ostensibly about her dogs but also about life in New York City after 9/11, politics in the US and her encounters with two macaques in Bali at the time of the 2005 bombing there.

In March 2010, she published "Trouble", an autobiographical collection of her best work from the last four decades, covering topics from politics, morality, finance, feminism and the writing life.

Jennings is also known for writing outspoken essays and op-eds on the state of fiction, the direction of feminism, malfeasance in the financial industry, and the abuse of language in the business world. Andrew Field, a prominent Nabokov scholar, describes Jennings as a "ferocious truth-teller". He also cites her "humor, her obdurate individuality, and her willingness to say what other people won't."

== Awards and nominations ==
1991 winner	Steele Rudd Award	for Women Falling Down in the Street
1993 winner	NBC Banjo Awards, NBC Turnbull Fox Phillips Poetry Prize	for Cats, Dogs and Pitchforks
1998 winner	Mildura Writers' Festival, Philip Hodgins Memorial Medal	
2003 shortlisted	The Miles Franklin Award	for Moral Hazard
2003 winner	Australian Literature Society Gold Medal	for Moral Hazard
2003 winner	NSW Premier's Award, Christina Stead Prize for Fiction	for Moral Hazard
2003 winner	Adelaide Festival Fiction Prize	for Moral Hazard

== Bibliography ==
=== Novels ===
- Snake (1996)
- Moral Hazard (2002)

=== Short fiction ===
Collections

- Women Falling Down in the Street (1990)

=== Poetry ===
Collections

- Come to Me My Melancholy Baby (1975)
- Cats, Dogs and Pitchforks (1993)

Anthologies (edited)

- Mother I'm Rooted (1975)

=== Selected articles ===
- "Best Business Books of the Millennium: Business Novels", Strategy+Business Q4 2001
- "Doublethink on Wall Street", Financial Times, 10 May 2002
- "The Hypocrisy of Wall Street Culture", The New York Times, 14 July 2002
- "Among the Strong and the Shrewd", Australian Financial Review, 2 May 2003
- "Gutless Fiction", Australian Financial Review, 26 August 2005
- "The Serious Business of Literature", Los Angeles Times Book Review, 11 May 2003
- "Less is More", Prospect magazine, February 2003
- "To Hell with the Future", Australian Financial Review, May 2009
- "Everywhere and nowhere : the Second Ray Mathew Lecture, 29 June 2010". The National Library Magazine. 2 (4): 23‒26. December 2010.
- "Letting in the Sunlight", The Business Writer
- "An Otter's Life: Learning to Swim", The Monthly magazine, December 2010 – January 2011 issue

=== Essay collections ===
- Save Me, Joe Louis (1988)
- Bad Manners (1993)

=== Memoirs ===
- Stanley and Sophie (2008)
- Trouble (2010)
