= Moral Hazard (novel) =

Book by Kate Jennings

- Author: Kate Jennings
- Language: English
- Genre: Novel
- Publisher: Picador, Australia
- Publication date: 2002
- Publication place: Australia
- Media type: Print (Paperback)
- Pages: 174 pp
- ISBN: 0-00-714108-4
- OCLC: 48892937
- Dewey Decimal: 823/.914 21
- LC Class: PR9619.3.J44 M67 2002
- Preceded by: Snake

Moral Hazard is a 2002 novel written by Australian author Kate Jennings.

It was the winner of the New South Wales Premier's Literary Awards, Christina Stead Prize for Fiction, and the Australian Literature Society Gold Medal in 2003, it was also shortlisted for the Miles Franklin Literary Award in the same year.

== Awards ==
- Adelaide Festival Awards for Literature (SA), Dymocks Booksellers Award for Fiction, 2004: winner
- New South Wales Premier's Literary Awards, Christina Stead Prize for Fiction, 2003: winner
- Miles Franklin Literary Award, 2003: shortlisted
- Australian Literature Society Gold Medal, 2003: winner

== Notes ==
- Listed in "The New York Times" Book Review's list of Notable Books for 2002.

== Reviews ==
Charles Taylor on the "Salon" website notes: "Sharp, spare, and utterly unsentimental, Kate Jennings' Moral Hazard lays out, in its meticulously composed 175 pages, the definitive treatment of contemporary workplace alienation...Jennings strikes exactly the right balance between satire and compassion, seeing her characters as flawed human beings and yet rendering them with scalpel-like precision...Don't let its brevity fool you. Moral Hazard is a big book in the truest sense of the word."

In the "San Francisco Chronicle" Jane Ciabattari concludes their review: "An extra layer of psychic pain colors scenes set in the shadow of the World Trade Center and in places like Pasqua, at one time a downtown coffee shop that catered to the bankers, traders, analysts and lawyers who worked there. But even without that timeliness, the novel has the power to move. Anyone who's watched a loved one suffer through the stages of dementia, or who's worked in an office run by fear, will recognize this world."

== Publication history ==
After its initial publication in 2002 by Picador, Australia, it was then reprinted as follows:

- Fourth Estate, USA, 2002
- Text Publishing, Australia, 2015 as part of their Classics series, with an introduction by Gideon Haigh

It was also translated into Dutch and French in 2004.
