= Winifred Birkett =

Australian novelist and poet

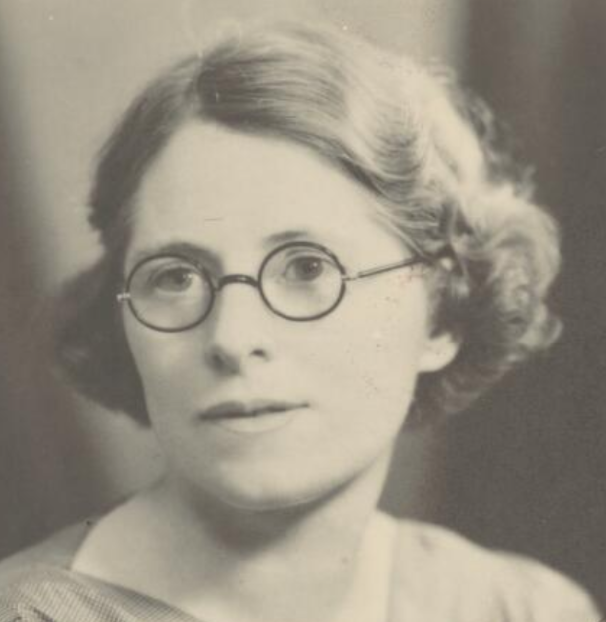
- Winifred Birkett, 1939
- Born: 1897; North Sydney, New South Wales
- Died: 13 January 1975 (aged 77–78); Sydney
- Occupation: Writer
- Writing career
- Language: English
- Notable work: Earth's Quality

Winifred Birkett (1897 – 13 January 1975) was an Australian novelist and poet who won the 1934 Australian Literature Society Gold Medal for her 1935 novel Earth's Quality.

== Life and career ==
Winifred Birkett was born in North Sydney, New South Wales in 1897, and educated at Sydney Church of England Grammar School.

Her book, Earth's Quality was published by Angus and Robertson in 1935. She was president of the Sydney Lyceum Club in 1940. She remained in Sydney much of her life.

== Personal ==
She married John Charles Greenwood at Chatswood on 18 September 1942. He was a widower who had served in the Field Ambulance in WWI and in the NSW Echelon and Records Unit in WWII.

Birkett died on 13 January 1975 in Sydney.

== Bibliography ==
=== Novels ===
- Three Goats on a Bender (1934)
- Earth's Quality (1935)
- Portrait of Lucy (1938)

=== Poetry ===
- Edelweiss, and Other Poems (1932)

== Quotes ==
Sonnet: "Forget me slowly dear. Let each day lie," Winifred Birkett, poetry 1930 (The Australia Woman's Mirror page 15).
