= Harland's Half Acre =

1984 novel by David Malouf

- Cover of the 1985 Penguin edition
- Author: David Malouf
- Language: English
- Genre: Novel
- Publisher: Chatto and Windus
- Publication place: UK
- Media type: Print
- Pages: 230 pp.
- ISBN: 0701127376

Harland's Half Acre (1984) is a novel written by Australian author David Malouf. It was originally published by Chatto and Windus in the United Kindgom.

== Plot summary ==
The novel follows the forunes of two families, the Harlands and the Vernons, over three generations. It concentrates on painter, Frank Harland, who, after wandering around Australia, settles in Brisbane where he meets and befriends Phil Vernon. They slowly discover how their two families are entangled.

== Critical reception ==
Writing in The Guardian Robert Nye was impressed with the work: "Ambitious in scope and poetic in its grasp and realisation of detail, this is an impressive portrait of a place and a way of life."

In The Age newspaper, D. J. O'Hearn called the novel a "masterpiece". He noted that in "this novel, where personal history and the history of our country are so intertwined, Malouf shows how mess may, with the right pattern, be stirred into truth."

== Publication history ==
After the novel's initial publication by Chatto and Windus in 1984 it was reprinted as follows:

- 1984 Knopf, USA
- 1985 Penguin Books, Australia
- 1985 Isis, UK
- 1997 Vintage Books, USA
- 1999 Vintage Books, UK
- 2013 Vintage Books, Australia

The novel was also translated into French in 1986.

== Notes ==
You can read an excerpt from the novel in the Fiction & Poetry Journal, May 1984, which was published as a supplement to The Age Monthly Review.
