= An Imaginary Life =

Novel by David Malouf

- First edition (US)
- Author: David Malouf
- Cover artist: Bill Bachman
- Language: English
- Publisher: George Braziller (US); Chatto & Windus (UK)
- Publication date: March 1978 (US); September 1978 (UK)
- Publication place: Australia
- Media type: Print (Hardcover)
- Pages: 174 pp
- ISBN: 0-8076-0884-X
- OCLC: 3543556
- Dewey Decimal: 3.14
- LC Class: PZ4.M25565 Im 1978 PR9619.3.M265

An Imaginary Life is a 1978 novella written by David Malouf.

== Plot ==
An Imaginary Life tells the story of the Roman poet Ovid, during his exile in Tomis.

While there, Ovid lives with the natives, although he doesn't understand their language, and forms a bond with a wild boy who is found living wild in nature. The relationship between Ovid and the boy, at first one of protector and protected, becomes an alliance between two people in a foreign land.

Ovid comes to Tomis enculturated with a Roman world view and through his attempts at teaching the boy language is able to free himself from the constrictions of Latin and the encompassing perception of reality that is his only barrier against transcendence.

Ovid is continually searching for the Child and what he represents to him. He goes so far as to capture him in an attempt to learn from him, and to teach him language and conventions.

== Critical reception ==
Reviewing the book in The Canberra Times Kevin Hart noted: "With writing of this sort, fiction that stretches the imagination far outside the confines of normal experience, the criterion for our judgment is not so much the extent of the imaginative flair displayed, but how the writer handles the problems caused by his extraordinary imagination. In this book all is worked out carefully, perhaps at times over-carefully, giving the impression that it is a superbly controlled exercise in style."

"An Imaginary Life is, in part, about an individual journey from a state of being cut off and apart from the environment – of wishing to tame and exploit nature, of being totally entangled in language and culture – to a state of being in intimate contact with the untrained, wild things of the world. It is also about a poet, in thrall of civilisation, realising that there are other ways to live and experience; ways that are beautiful and fulfilling...Those themes – of belonging and exile, of how to relate to the environment and to those who are different to us – are core to the debate about what it means to be Australian today. An Imaginary Life does not provide a workable template for how to navigate the complexity of belonging and un-belonging, nor should it. It’s a novel not a policy document. It does, however, show us it is possible to imagine ways to do things differently, ways to live differently with each other and with nature. And once imagined, those other ways of living seem all the more possible."

== Awards ==
- 1979 – winner New South Wales Premier's Literary Awards — Fiction
