= Remembering Babylon =

1993 novel by David Malouf

- First edition
- Author: David Malouf
- Language: English
- Publisher: Chatto & Windus (UK); Random House (Australia)
- Publication date: 1993
- Publication place: Australia
- Media type: Paperback
- Pages: 202 pp
- ISBN: 0-7011-5883-2
- OCLC: 28290162

Remembering Babylon is a novel by David Malouf, published in 1993. It won the inaugural International Dublin Literary Award and was shortlisted for the Booker Prize and the Miles Franklin Award.

The novel covers themes of isolation, language, relationships (particularly those between men), community and living "on the edge" (of society, consciousness, culture).

Its themes evolve into a greater narrative of an English boy, Gemmy Fairley, who is marooned on a foreign land and is raised by a group of Aboriginal people, natives to the land in Queensland. When white settlers reach the area, he attempts to move back in the world of Europeans. As Gemmy wrestles with his own identity, the community of settlers struggle to deal with their fear of the unknown.

The narrative was influenced by the experiences of James Morrill, a shipwreck survivor who lived with Aboriginal people in North Queensland for 17 years from 1846 to 1863.

== Style and themes ==
Malouf's narrative voice is at once scattered and singular, skipping between perspectives on the same events, and forcing the reader to pay close attention to each character's rendering in order to arrive at the most whole truth possible. The magical realism theme is cultivated in the exaggerated response of all the characters to mundane items: Gemmy surrenders to what he knows is a stick instead of a gun, because he attributes Lachlan's aiming it at him as a signal of the wariness of the other settlers. The men of the community are in an uproar over a stone that visiting Aboriginal people (supposedly) pass off to Gemmy for no logical reason—only because they fear whatever knowledge the Aboriginal people have garnered of the land. These settlers are the first whites to live on that soil, and view anything that is not white with an extreme wariness, not only of the physical land but the spiritual sense of the place.

== Awards and nominations ==
- International Dublin Literary Award, 1996: winner
- Prix Baudelaire (France), 1995: winner
- Los Angeles Times Book Prize for Fiction, 1994: winner
- Commonwealth Writers Prize, South-East Asia and South Pacific Region, Best Book from the Region Award, 1994: winner
- National Book Council Banjo Award for Fiction, 1994: shortlisted
- Prix Femina (France), Best Foreign Novel, 1994: winner
- New South Wales Premier's Literary Awards, Christina Stead Prize for Fiction, 1993: winner
