= 2021 in Australian literature =

This is a list of historical events and publications of Australian literature during 2021.

== Major publications ==
=== Literary fiction ===
- David Allan-Petale – Locust Summer
- Aravind Adiga – Amnesty
- Michael Mohammed Ahmad – The Other Half of You
- Miles Allinson – In Moonland
- Larissa Behrendt – After Story
- Steven Carroll – O
- Michelle de Kretser – Scary Monsters
- Jennifer Down – Bodies of Light
- Briohny Doyle – Echolalia
- Max Easton – The Magpie Wing
- Nikki Gemmell – The Ripping Tree
- Anita Heiss – Bila Yarrudhanggalangdhuray: River of Dreams
- Tom Keneally – Corporal Hitler's Pistol
- John Kinsella – Pushing Back
- Emily Maguire – Love Objects
- Jennifer Mills – The Airways
- Alice Pung – One Hundred Days
- Diana Reid – Love & Virtue
- Nicolas Rothwell – Red Heaven
- Claire Thomas – The Performance
- Christos Tsiolkas – 7 ½
- Michael Winkler – Grimmish

=== Short story collections ===
- Tony Birch – Dark as Last Night

=== Children's and young adult fiction ===
- Felicity Castagna – Girls in Boys' Cars
- Sophie Gonzales – Only Mostly Devastated
- Katrina Nannestad – Rabbit, Soldier, Angel Thief

=== Crime and mystery ===
- Tim Ayliffe – The Enemy Within
- Mark Brandi – The Others
- B. M. Carroll – You Had It Coming
- Candice Fox – The Chase
- Helen FitzGerald – Ash Mountain
- Jack Heath – Kill Your Brother
- Charlotte McConaghy – Once There Were Wolves
- Debra Oswald – The Family Doctor
- Kyle Perry – The Deep
- Michael Robotham – When You Are Mine
- Laurta Elizabeth Woollett – The Newcomer

=== Science fiction and fantasy ===
- Max Barry – The 22 Murders of Madison May
- Greg Egan – The Book of All Skies
- Jay Kristoff – Empire of the Vampire
- Shelley Parker-Chan – She Who Became the Sun
- Angela Slatter – All the Murmuring Bones
- Janeen Webb – The Five Star Republic with Andrew Enstice

=== Poetry ===
- Eunice Andrada – Take Care
- Evelyn Araluen – Dropbear
- Pam Brown – Stasis Shuffle
- Maxine Beneba Clarke – How Decent Folk Behave
- Andy Jackson – Human Looking
- Elfie Shiosaki – Homecoming
- Maria Takolander – Trigger Warning

=== Non-fiction ===
- Randa Abdel-Fattah – Coming of Age in the War on Terror
- Julia Banks – Power Play: Breaking Through Bias, Barriers and Boys' Clubs
- Alison Croggon – Monsters: A reckoning
- Jaivet Ealom – Escape From Manus
- Mehreen Faruqi – Too Migrant, Too Muslim, Too Loud
- Ross Garnaut – Reset: Restoring Australia after the Pandemic Recession
- Stan Grant – With the Falling of the Dusk
- Dale Kent – The Most I Could Be
- Scott Ludlam – Full Circle: A search for the world that comes next
- Mark McKenna – Return to Uluru
- Henry Reynolds – Truth-Telling: History, sovereignty and the Uluru Statement
- Jeff Sparrow – Crimes Against Nature: Capitalism and Global Heating
- Corey Tutt and Blak Douglas (illustrator) – The First Scientists: Deadly Inventions and Innovations from Australia's First Peoples

=== Collected essays ===
- Chelsea Watego – Another Day in the Colony

== Awards and honours ==
Note: these awards were presented in the year in question.

=== Lifetime achievement ===
Award	Author
Melbourne Prize for Literature	Christos Tsiolkas
Patrick White Award	Adam Aitken

=== Literary ===
Award	Author	Title	Publisher
ALS Gold Medal	Nardi Simpson	Song of the Crocodile	Hachette Australia
Colin Roderick Award	Sofie Laguna	Infinite Splendours	Allen & Unwin
Indie Book Awards Book of the Year	Pip Williams	The Dictionary of Lost Words	Affirm Press
New South Wales Premier's Literary Awards	Ellen van Neerven	Throat	University of Queensland Press
Stella Prize	Evie Wyld	The Bass Rock	Penguin Random House
Victorian Premier's Literary Awards	Laura Jean McKay	The Animals in That Country	Scribe

=== Fiction ===
==== National ====
Award	Author	Title	Publisher
Adelaide Festival Awards for Literature	Not awarded		
The Age Book of the Year	Robbie Arnott	The Rain Heron	Text Publishing
ARA Historical Novel Prize	Jock Serong	The Burning Island	Text Publishing
The Australian/Vogel Literary Award	Emma Batchelor	Now That I See You	Allen & Unwin
Barbara Jefferis Award	Not awarded		
Indie Book Awards Book of the Year – Fiction	Craig Silvey	Honeybee	Allen & Unwin
Indie Book Awards Book of the Year – Debut Fiction	Pip Williams	The Dictionary of Lost Words	Affirm Press
Miles Franklin Award	Amanda Lohrey	The Labyrinth	Text Publishing
Prime Minister's Literary Awards	Amanda Lohrey	The Labyrinth	Text Publishing
New South Wales Premier's Literary Awards	Kate Grenville	A Room Made of Leaves	Text Publishing
Queensland Literary Awards	Nardi Simpson	Song of the Crocodile	Hachette Australia
Victorian Premier's Literary Awards	Laura Jean McKay	The Animals in That Country	Scribe
Voss Literary Prize	Amanda Lohrey	The Labyrinth	Text Publishing

=== Children and Young Adult ===
==== National ====
Award	Category	Author	Title	Publisher
ARA Historical Novel Prize	Children and Young Adult	Katrina Nannestad	We are Wolves	ABC Books
Children's Book of the Year Award	Older Readers	Davina Bell	The End of the World is Bigger than Love	Text
Children's Book of the Year Award	Younger Readers	Kate Gordon	Aster's Good, Right Things	Riveted Press
Children's Book of the Year Award	Picture Book	Meg McKinlay, illus. Matt Ottley	How to Make a Bird	Walker Books
Children's Book of the Year Award	Early Childhood	Libby Hathorn & Lisa Hathorn-Jarman, illus. Mel Pearce	No! Never!	Lothian Books
Children's Book of the Year Award	Eve Pownall Award for Information Books	Pamela Freeman, illus. Liz Anelli	Dry to Dry: The Seasons of Kakadu	Walker Books
Children's Book of the Year Award	Nan Chauncy Award	Jan Nicholls		
Indie Book Awards Book of the Year	Children's	Amelia Mellor	The Grandest Bookshop in the World	Affirm Press
Indie Book Awards Book of the Year	Young Adult	Kate O'Donnell	This One is Ours	University of Queensland Press
New South Wales Premier's Literary Awards	Children's	Amelia Mellor	The Grandest Bookshop in the World	Affirm
New South Wales Premier's Literary Awards	Young People's	Davina Bell	The End of the World is Bigger than Love	Text
Queensland Literary Awards	Children's	Kirli Saunders, illustrated by Dub Leffler	Bindi	Magabala Books
Queensland Literary Awards	Young Adult	Cath Moore	Metal Fish, Falling Snow	Text
Victorian Premier's Literary Awards	Young Adult Fiction	Cath Moore	Metal Fish, Falling Snow	Text

=== Crime and Mystery ===
==== National ====
Award	Category	Author	Title	Publisher
Davitt Award	Novel	Sally Hepworth	The Good Sister	Pan Macmillan
Davitt Award	Young adult novel	Christie Nieman	Where We Begin	Pan Macmillan
Davitt Award	Children's novel	Lian Tanner	A Clue for Clara	Allen & Unwin
Davitt Award	True crime	Louise Milligan	Witness	Hachette Australia
Davitt Award	Debut novel	Leah Swann	Sheerwater	HarperCollins
Davitt Award	Readers' choice	Katherine Kovacic	The Shifting Landscape	Echo Publishing
Ned Kelly Award	Novel	Garry Disher	Consolation	Text Publishing
Ned Kelly Award	First novel	Loraine Peck	The Second Son	Penguin Books
Ned Kelly Award	True crime	Bret Christian	Stalking Claremont	HarperCollins

=== Poetry ===
Award	Author	Title	Publisher
Adelaide Festival Awards for Literature	Not awarded		
Anne Elder Award	Ella Jeffery	Dead Bolt	Puncher & Wattmann
Mary Gilmore Award	Em König	Breathing Plural	Cordite
Prime Minister's Literary Awards	Stephen Edgar	The Strangest Place: New and Selected Poems	Black Pepper
New South Wales Premier's Literary Awards	Ellen van Neerven	Throat	University of Queensland Press
Judith Wright Calanthe Award for a Poetry Collection	Ouyang Yu	Terminally Poetic	Ginninderra Press
Victorian Premier's Literary Awards	David Stavanger	Case Notes	UWA Publishing

=== Drama ===
Award	Category	Author	Title	Publisher
New South Wales Premier's Literary Awards	Script	Laurence Billiet	Freeman	General Strike and Matchbox Pictures
New South Wales Premier's Literary Awards	Play	Dylan Van Den Berg	Milk	The Street Theatre
Victorian Premier's Literary Awards		Angus Cerini	Wonnangatta	Sydney Theatre Company
Patrick White Playwrights' Award	Award	Kamarra Bell-Wykes	Who's Gonna Love 'Em? I am that i AM	Malthouse Theatre
Patrick White Playwrights' Award	Fellowship	Emme Hoy		

=== Non-Fiction ===
Award	Category	Author	Title	Publisher
Adelaide Festival Awards for Literature	Non-Fiction	Not awarded		
Indie Book Awards Book of the Year	Non-Fiction	Julia Baird	Phosphorescence	Random House
Indie Book Awards Book of the Year	Illustrated Non-Fiction	Lauren Camilleri & Sophia Kaplan	Plantopedia	Smith Street Books
National Biography Award	Biography	Cassandra Pybus	Truganini: Journey Through the Apocalypse	Allen & Unwin
New South Wales Premier's Literary Awards	Non-Fiction	Kate Fullagar	The Warrior, the Voyager, and the Artist: Three Lives in an Age of Empire	Yale University Press
New South Wales Premier's History Awards	Australian History	Grace Karskens	People of the River: Lost worlds of early Australia	Allen & Unwin
New South Wales Premier's History Awards	Community and Regional History	Matthew Colloff	Landscapes of Our Hearts: Reconciling people and environment	Thames & Hudson
New South Wales Premier's History Awards	General History	Luke Keogh	The Wardian Case: How a simple box moved plants and changed the world	The University of Chicago Press
Queensland Literary Awards	Non-Fiction	Luke Stegemann	Amnesia Road: Landscape, violence and memory	NewSouth Publishing
Victorian Premier's Literary Awards	Non-Fiction	Paddy Manning	Body Count: How Climate Change is Killing Us	Simon & Schuster

== Deaths ==
- 1 May – Kate Jennings, poet and writer (died in the United States) (b. 1948)
- 25 April – Valerie Parv, romance novelist (b. 1951)
- 16 May – Vera Deacon, historian (b. 1926)
- 16 September – Tim Thorne, poet (b. 1944)
- 22 November –
  - Stuart Macintyre, historian (b. 1947)
  - Doug MacLeod, children's writer, poet, screenwriter and playwright (b. 1959)
  - Babette Smith, historian (b. 1942)
- 26 November – Desmond O'Grady, journalist and author (died in Rome) (b. 1929)
- 26 December – Paul B. Kidd, radio broadcaster and true crime writer (b. 1945)

== See also ==
- 2021 in Australia
- 2021 in literature
- 2021 in poetry
- List of years in Australian literature
- List of years in literature
- List of Australian literary awards
