= 2022 in Australian literature =

This is a list of historical events and publications of Australian literature during 2022.

== Major publications ==
=== Literary fiction ===
- Robbie Arnott – Limberlost
- Jessica Au – Cold Enough for Snow
- Geraldine Brooks – Horse
- Jane Caro – The Mother
- Steven Carroll – Goodnight, Vivienne, Goodnight
- Shankari Chandran – Chai Time at Cinnamon Gardens (winner, 2023 Miles Franklin Award)
- Robert Drewe – Nimblefoot
- Gail Jones – Salonika Burning
- Yumna Kassab – The Lovers
- Robert Lukins – Loveland
- Fiona McFarlane – The Sun Walks Down
- Fiona Kelly McGregor – Iris
- Paddy O'Reilly – Other Houses
- Edwina Preston – Bad Art Mother
- Craig Sherborne – The Grass Hotel
- Steve Toltz – Here Goes Nothing

=== Short story collections ===
- Katerina Gibson – Women I Know
- Mirandi Riwoe – The Burnished Sun

=== Crime and mystery ===
- Shelley Burr – Wake
- Aoife Clifford – When We Fall
- Chris Hammer – The Tilt
- Jane Harper – Exiles
- Sally Hepworth – The Soulmate
- Katherine Kovacic – Seven Sisters
- Tracey Lien – All That's Left Unsaid
- Dervla McTiernan – The Murder Rule
- Michael Robotham – Lying Beside You
- Emma Viskic – Those Who Perish
- Sean Wilson – Gemini Falls
- Greg Woodland – The Carnival is Over

=== Science fiction and fantasy ===
- Eugen Bacon – Mage of Fools
- Grace Chan – Every Version of You
- Greg Egan
  - "After Zero"
  - "Crisis Actors"
  - "Dream Factory"
- Sean McMullen – Generation Nemesis
- Jane Rawson – A History of Dreams
- Angela Slatter – The Path of Thorns

=== Children's and young adult fiction ===
- Randa Abdel-Fattah, illus. by Maxine Beneba Clarke – 11 Words for Love
- Lian Tanner – Rita’s Revenge
- Gabrielle Wang – Zadie Ma and the Dog Who Chased the Moon

=== Poetry ===
- Adam Aitken – Revenants
- Boey Kim Cheng – The Singer and Other Poems
- Marion May Campbell – Languish
- Brook Emery – Sea Scale: New & Selected Poems.
- Lionel Fogarty – Harvest Lingo
- Lisa Gorton – Mirabilia
- Sarah Holland-Batt – The Jaguar
- John Kinsella – The Ascension of Sheep, Collected Poems Volume One (1980–2005)
- Les Murray – Continuous Creation
- Rae White – Exactly As I Am

=== Non-Fiction ===
- Alison Bashford – An Intimate History of Evolution: The Story of the Huxley Family
- Debra Dank – We Come With This Place
- Jo Dyer – Burning Down the House: Reconstructing Modern Politics
- Madonna King – L Platers:How to support your teen daughter on the road to adulthood
- Louisa Lim – Indelible City: Dispossession and Defiance in Hong Kong
- Julianne Schultz – The Idea of Australia: A search for the soul of the nation

=== Memoir ===
- Hannah Gadsby – Ten Steps to Nanette: A memoir situation
- Anita Heiss – Am I Black Enough For You Ten Years On
- Chloe Hooper – Bedtime Story
- Anita Jacoby – Secrets Beyond the Screen
- Wendy McCarthy – Don't Be Too Polite, Girls
- Brenda Niall – My Accidental Career
- Heather Rose – Nothing Bad Ever Happens Here

== Awards and honours ==
Note: these awards were presented in the year in question.

=== Lifetime achievement ===
Award	Author
Mona Brand Award	Andrea James
Patrick White Award	Antigone Kefala

=== Literary ===
Award	Author	Title	Publisher
ALS Gold Medal	Andy Jackson	Human Looking	Giramondo Publishing
Colin Roderick Award	Emily Bitto	Wild Abandon	Allen & Unwin
Indie Book Awards Book of the Year	Trent Dalton	Love Stories	Fourth Estate
New South Wales Premier's Literary Awards	Safdar Ahmed	Still Alive: Notes from Australia’s Immigration Detention System	Twelve Panels Press
Stella Prize	Evelyn Araluen	Dropbear	University of Queensland Press
Victorian Premier's Literary Awards	Veronica Gorrie	Black and Blue: A memoir of racism and resilience	Scribe

=== Fiction ===
Award	Author	Title	Publisher
Adelaide Festival Awards for Literature	Tara June Winch	The Yield	Penguin
The Age Book of the Year	Miles Allinson	In Moonland	Scribe
ARA Historical Novel Prize	Tom Keneally	Corporal Hitler's Pistol	Vintage
The Australian/Vogel Literary Award	Nell Pierce	A Place Near Eden	Allen & Unwin
Barbara Jefferis Award	S. L. Lim	Revenge	Transit Lounge Publishing
Indie Book Awards Book of the Year – Fiction	Charlotte McConaghy	Once There Were Wolves	Hamish Hamilton
Indie Book Awards Book of the Year – Debut Fiction	Lyn Yeowart	The Silent Listener	Viking
Miles Franklin Award	Jennifer Down	Bodies of Light	Text
Prime Minister's Literary Awards	Nicolas Rothwell	Red Heaven	Text
New South Wales Premier's Literary Awards	Tony Birch	Dark as Last Night	UQP
Queensland Literary Awards	Michael Mohammed Ahmad	The Other Half of You	Hachette Australia
Victorian Premier's Literary Awards	Melisa Manning	Smokehouse	UQP
Voss Literary Prize	Larissa Behrendt	After Story	University of Queensland Press

=== Children and Young Adult ===
Award	Category	Author	Title	Publisher
ARA Historical Novel Prize	Children and Young Adult	Katrina Nannestad	Rabbit, Soldier, Angel, Thief	HarperCollins
Children's Book of the Year Award	Older Readers	Rebecca Lim	Tiger Daughter	Allen & Unwin
Children's Book of the Year Award	Younger Readers	Shirley Marr	A Glasshouse of Stars	Puffin
Children's Book of the Year Award	Picture Book	Claire Saxby, illus by Jess Racklyeft	Iceberg	Allen & Unwin
Children's Book of the Year Award	Early Childhood	Andrea Rowe, illus by Hannah Sommerville	Jetty Jumping	Hardie Grant
Children's Book of the Year Award	Eve Pownall Award for Information Books	Safdar Ahmed	Still Alive, Notes from Australia's Immigration Detention System	Twelve Panels Press
Children's Book of the Year Award	Lifetime Achievement	Margaret Wild		
Indie Book Awards Book of the Year	Children's	Katrina Nannestad	Rabbit, Soldier, Angel, Thief	ABC Books
Indie Book Awards Book of the Year	Young Adult	Danielle Binks	The Monster of Her Age	Lothian
New South Wales Premier's Literary Awards	Children's	Peter Carnavas	My Brother Ben	UQP
New South Wales Premier's Literary Awards	Young People's	Leanne Hall	The Gaps	Text
Queensland Literary Awards	Children's	Kunyi June Anne McInerney	Kunyi	Magabala Books
Queensland Literary Awards	Young Adult	Felicity Castagna	Girls in Boys' Cars	Pan
Victorian Premier's Literary Awards	Young Adult Fiction	Felicity Castagna	Girls in Boys' Cars	Pan

=== Crime and Mystery ===
==== International ====
Award	Category	Author	Title	Publisher
Barry Award	Paperback Original	Dervla McTiernan	The Good Turn	HarperCollins

==== National ====
Award	Category	Author	Title	Publisher
Davitt Award	Novel	Charlotte McConaghy	Once There Were Wolves	Hamish Hamilton
Davitt Award	Young adult novel	Leanne Hall	The Gaps	Text Publishing
Davitt Award	Children's novel	Nicki Greenberg	The Detective’s Guide to Ocean Travel	Affirm Press
Davitt Award	Non-fiction	Kate Holden	The Winter Road: A story of legacy, land and a killing at Croppa Creek	Black Inc
Davitt Award	Debut novel	Jacqueline Bublitz	Before You Knew My Name	Allen & Unwin
Davitt Award	Readers' choice	Jacqueline Bublitz	Before You Knew My Name	Allen & Unwin
Ned Kelly Award	Novel	Candice Fox	The Chase	Bantam Books
Ned Kelly Award	First novel	Josh Kemp	Banjawarn	UWA Publishing
Ned Kelly Award	True crime	Debi Marshall	Banquet: The Untold Story of Adelaide's Family Murders	Vintage Books

=== Poetry ===
Award	Author	Title	Publisher
Adelaide Festival Awards for Literature	Jodie Albiston	Fifteeners	Puncher & Wattmann
Anne Elder Award	Audrey Molloy	The Important Things	Gallery Press
Mary Gilmore Award	Jelena Dinic	In the Room with the She Wolf	Wakefield Press
Prime Minister's Literary Awards	Andy Jackson	Human Looking	Giramondo Publishing
New South Wales Premier's Literary Awards	Dan Disney	accelerations & inertias	Vagabond Press
Judith Wright Calanthe Award for a Poetry Collection	Pam Brown	Stasis Shuffle	Hunter
Victorian Premier's Literary Awards	Maria Takolander	Trigger Warning	University of Queensland Press

=== Drama ===
Award	Category	Author	Title	Publisher
New South Wales Premier's Literary Awards	Script	Shaun Grant	NITRAM	
New South Wales Premier's Literary Awards	Play	Kirsty Marillier	Orange Thrower	Currency Press
Victorian Premier's Literary Awards		Dylan Van Den Berg	Milk	
Patrick White Playwrights' Award	Award	Aran Thangaratnam	love MAD GLITCH	Sydney Theatre Company
Patrick White Playwrights' Award	Fellowship	Joanna Murray-Smith		

=== Non-Fiction ===
Award	Category	Author	Title	Publisher
Adelaide Festival Awards for Literature	Non-Fiction	Helen Ennis	Olive Cotton: A Life in Photography	Fourth Estate
The Age Book of the Year	Non-Fiction	Bennadette Brennan	Leaping Into Waterfalls: The Enigmatic Gillian Mears	Allen & Unwin
Indie Book Awards Book of the Year	Non-Fiction	Trent Dalton	Love Stories	Fourth Estate
Indie Book Awards Book of the Year	Illustrated Non-Fiction	Amber Creswell Bell	Still Life	Thames and Hudson
National Biography Award	Biography	Bernadette Brennan	Leaping into Waterfalls: The Enigmatic Gillian Mears	Allen & Unwin
New South Wales Premier's Literary Awards	Non-Fiction	Kate Holden	The Winter Road: A Story of Legacy, Land and a Killing at Croppa Creek	Black Inc.
New South Wales Premier's History Awards	Australian History	Alexis Bergantz	French Connection: Australia’s Cosmopolitan Ambitions	NewSouth Publishing
New South Wales Premier's History Awards	Community and Regional History	Kate Holden	The Winter Road: A Story of Legacy, Land, and a Killing at Croppa Creek	Black Inc.
New South Wales Premier's History Awards	General History	Mina Roces	The Filipino Migration Experience: Global Agents of Change	Cornell University Press
Queensland Literary Awards	Non-Fiction	Claire G. Coleman	Lies, Damned Lies	Ultimo Press
Victorian Premier's Literary Awards	Non-Fiction	Amani Haydar	The Mother Wound	Pan

== Deaths ==
- 22 January – Craig McGregor, journalist and writer (born 1933)
- 5 February – John Bryson, writer and lawyer (born 1935)
- 1 March – Jordie Albiston, poet (born 1961)
- 8 March – Annah Faulkner, novelist (born 1949/50)
- 19 March – Alan Hopgood, playwright and screenwriter (born 1934)
- 29 April – Craig Powell, poet (born 1940)
- 2 June – Brian Matthews, literary scholar and writer (born 1936)
- 6 June – Helen Hodgman, novelist (born in Scotland) (born 1945)
- 26 June – Frank Moorhouse, writer (born 1938)
- 14 July – Clem Tisdell, economist (born 1939)
- 26 July – David Ireland, novelist and three-time winner of Miles Franklin Award (born 1927)
- 27 July – Edwin Wilson, poet, painter, scientist (born 1942)
- 3 August
  - Bruce Grant, writer and journalist (born 1925)
  - Evan Jones, poet and academic (born 1931)
- 12 August – Virginia Spate, art historian (born in the United Kingdom) (born 1937)
- 29 August – Craig Powell, poet and psychoanalyst (born 1940)
- 20 September – Peter Yeldham, screenwriter, playwright and novelist (born 1927)
- 8 October – Angus Trumble, art curator and historian (born 1964)
- 17 October – Dame Carmen Callil, publisher, writer and critic (died in the United Kingdom) (born 1938)
- 24 November – Margaret Hamilton, children's literature publisher and writer (born 1941)
- 2 December
  - Jill Jolliffe, journalist and non-fiction writer (born 1945)
  - Antigone Kefala, poet and prose-writer (born in Romania) (born 1935)
- 16 December – Robert Adamson, poet (born 1943)
- December – Wendy Jenkins, poet, editor and YA novelist (born 1952)

== See also ==
- 2022 in Australia
- 2022 in literature
- 2022 in poetry
- List of years in Australian literature
- List of years in literature
