= 2025 in Australian literature =

This is a list of historical events and publications of Australian literature during 2025.

== Events ==
- Text Publishing is acquired by Penguin Random House Australia.

== Major publications ==
=== Literary fiction ===
- Randa Abdel-Fattah – Discipline
- Lyn Dickens – Salt Upon the Water
- Moreno Giovannoni – The Immigrants
- Toni Jordan – Tenderfoot
- Steve MinOn – First Name Second Name
- Konrad Muller – My Heart at Evening
- Omar Musa – Fierceland
- Josephine Rowe – Little World
- Madeleine Watts – Elegy, Southwest
- Sean Wilson – You Must Remember This

=== Crime and mystery ===
- James Bradley – Landfall
- Catherine Jinks – Panic
- Dervla McTiernan – The Unquiet Grave

=== Science fiction and Fantasy ===
- James Islington – The Strength of the Few
- Freya Marske – Cinder House
- Angela Slatter – The Crimson Road
- Emma Sloley – The Island of Last Things

=== Children's and young adult ===
- Margot McGovern – This Stays Between Us
- Zeno Sworder – Once I Was a Giant
- Lili Wilkinson – Unhallowed Halls

=== Poetry ===
- Eunice Andrada – KONTRA
- Evelyn Araluen – The Rot
- Jill Jones – How to Emerge

=== Drama ===
- Emilie Collyer – Super

=== Non-Fiction ===
- Robert Dessaix – Chameleon
- Brenda Niall – Joan Lindsay
- Micaela Sahhar – Find Me at the Jaffa Gate: An Encyclopaedia of a Palestinian Family
- Kate Wild – The Red House

== Awards and honours ==
Note: these awards were presented in the year in question.

=== Lifetime achievement ===
Award	Author
Patrick White Award	Not yet awarded

=== Literary ===
Award	Author	Title	Publisher
ALS Gold Medal	Fiona McFarlane	Highway 13	Allen & Unwin
Colin Roderick Award	Khin Myint	Fragile Creatures : A Memoir	Black Inc
Indie Book Awards Book of the Year	Robbie Arnott	Dusk	Picador
New South Wales Premier's Literary Awards	Nam Le	36 Ways to Write a Vietnamese Poem	Scribner
Stella Prize	Michelle de Kretser	Theory & Practice	Text Publishing
Victorian Premier's Literary Awards	Wanda Gibson	Three Dresses	University of Queensland Press
Western Australian Premier's Book Awards – Book of the Year	Alan Fyfe	G-d, Sleep, and Chaos	Gazebo

=== Fiction ===
Award	Author	Title	Publisher
The Age Book of the Year	Rodney Hall	Vortex	Picador
ARA Historical Novel Prize	Robbie Arnott	Dusk	Picador
ARA Historical Novel Prize	Tasma Walton	I Am Nannertgarrook	Bundyi
Indie Book Awards Book of the Year – Fiction	Robbie Arnott	Dusk	Picador
Indie Book Awards Book of the Year – Debut Fiction	Lauren Keegan	All the Bees in the Hollows	Affirm Press
Miles Franklin Award	Siang Lu	Ghost Cities	University of Queensland Press
Prime Minister's Literary Awards	Michelle de Kretser	Theory & Practice	Text
New South Wales Premier's Literary Awards	Fiona McFarlane	Highway 13	Allen & Unwin
Queensland Literary Awards	Emily Maguire	Rapture	Allen & Unwin
Victorian Premier's Literary Awards	Fiona McFarlane	Highway 13	Allen & Unwin
Voss Literary Prize	Fiona McFarlane	Highway 13	Allen & Unwin
Western Australian Premier's Book Awards	Louise Wolhuter	Shadows of Winter Robins	Ultimo

=== Children and Young Adult ===
Award	Category	Author	Title	Publisher
ARA Historical Novel Prize	Children and Young Adult	Suzanne Leal	The Year We Escaped	HarperCollins
Children's Book of the Year Award	Older Readers	Gary Lonesborough	I'm Not Really Here	Allen and Unwin
Children's Book of the Year Award	Younger Readers	Maryam Master, illus. by Astred Hicks	Laughter Is the Best Ending	Pan
Children's Book of the Year Award	Picture Book	Deborah Frenkel, illus. by Danny Snell	The Truck Cat	Bright Light
Children's Book of the Year Award	Early Childhood	Darren McCallum, illus. by Craig Smith	The Wobbly Bike	Walker
Children's Book of the Year Award	Eve Pownall Award for Information Books	Aunty Fay Muir and Sue Lawson	Always Was, Always Will Be	Magabala
Children's Book of the Year Award	New Illustrator	Sarah Capon, written by Bec Nanayakkara	Grow Big, Little Seed	Bright Light
Indie Book Awards Book of the Year	Children's	Katrina Nannestad	All the Beautiful Things	HarperCollins
Indie Book Awards Book of the Year	Young Adult	Kate Emery	My Family and Other Suspects	Allen and Unwin
Prime Minister's Literary Awards	Children's	Peter Carnavas	Leo and Ralph	University of Queensland Press
Prime Minister's Literary Awards	Young Adult	Krystal Sutherland	The Invocations	Penguin
New South Wales Premier's Literary Awards	Children's	Katrina Nannestad	All the Beautiful Things	HarperCollins
New South Wales Premier's Literary Awards	Young People's	Emma Lord	Anomaly	Affirm Press
Queensland Literary Awards	Children's	Sandy Bigna	Little Bones	University of Queensland Press
Queensland Literary Awards	Young Adult	C. G. Drews	Don't Let the Forest In	Feiwel & Friends
Victorian Premier's Literary Awards	Young Adult Fiction	Emma Lord	Anomaly	Affirm Press
Western Australian Premier's Book Awards	Children's	Kelly Canby	A Leaf Called Greaf	Fremantle
Western Australian Premier's Book Awards	Young Adult	Kate Emery	My Family and Other Suspects	Allen & Unwin

=== Crime and Mystery ===
==== National ====
Award	Category	Author	Title	Publisher
Davitt Award	Novel	Vikki Wakefield	To the River	Text Publishing
Davitt Award	Young adult novel	Erin Gough	Into the Mouth of the Wolf	Hardie Grant Publishing
Davitt Award	Children's novel	Judith Rossell	The Midwatch	Hardie Grant Publishing
Davitt Award	Non-fiction	Lucia Osborne-Crowley	The Lasting Harm: Witnessing the Trial of Ghislaine Maxwell	Allen and Unwin
Davitt Award	Debut	Georgia Harper	What I Would Do to You	Penguin Random House Australia
Davitt Award	Readers' choice	Dervla McTiernan	What Happened to Nina?	HarperCollins Publishers
Ned Kelly Award	Novel	Margaret Hickey	The Creeper	Random House Australia
Ned Kelly Award	First novel	Lisa Kenway	All You Took From Me	Transit Lounge
Ned Kelly Award	True crime	Steve Johnson	A Thousand Miles from Care	HarperCollins Publishers

=== Non-Fiction ===
Award	Category	Author	Title	Publisher
The Age Book of the Year	Non-Fiction	Lech Blaine	Australian Gospel	Black Inc.
Indie Book Awards Book of the Year	Non-Fiction	Markus Zusak	Three Wild Dogs and the Truth	Picador
Indie Book Awards Book of the Year	Illustrated Non-Fiction	Criss Canning	The Paintings of Criss Canning	Thames and Hudson Australia
National Biography Award	Biography	Abbas El-Zein	Bullet, Paper, Rock: A Memoir of Words and Wars	Upswell Publishing
Prime Minister's Literary Awards	Non-Fiction	Rick Morton	Mean Streak	Fourth Estate
Prime Minister's Literary Awards	Australian History	Geraldine Fela	Critical Care: Nurses on the Frontline of Australia’s AIDS Crisis	UNSW Press
New South Wales Premier's Literary Awards	Non-Fiction	James Bradley	Deep Water	Hamish Hamilton
New South Wales Premier's History Awards	Australian History	Darren Rix and Craig Cormick	Warra Warra Wai	Scribner Australia
New South Wales Premier's History Awards	Community and Regional History	Alana Piper	Yirranma Place: Stories of a Darlinghurst corner	NewSouth Publishing
New South Wales Premier's History Awards	General History	Robyn Arianrhod	Vector: A surprising story of space, time, and mathematical transformation	UNSW Press
New South Wales Premier's History Awards	Young People's History Prize	Sophie Masson	Our History: Bold Ben Hall	Walker Books
New South Wales Premier's History Awards	Anzac Memorial Trustees Military History Prize	Patricia Collins	Rock and Tempest: Surviving Cyclone Tracy and its aftermath	Hachette Australia
Queensland Literary Awards	Non-Fiction	Clare Wright	Näku Dhäruk: The Bark Petitions	Text
Victorian Premier's Literary Awards	Non-Fiction	Susan Hampton	Anything Can Happen	Puncher & Wattman
Western Australian Premier's Book Awards	Non-Fiction	Gerard McCann	Anatomy of a Secret	Fremantle

=== Poetry ===
Award	Author	Title	Publisher
Anne Elder Award	Izzy Roberts-Orr	Raw Salt	Vagabond
Mary Gilmore Award	Hasib Hourani	rock flight	Giramondo
Prime Minister's Literary Awards	David Brooks	The Other Side of Daylight: New and Selected Poems	University of Queensland Press
New South Wales Premier's Literary Awards	Hasib Hourani	rock flight	Giramondo
Judith Wright Calanthe Award for a Poetry Collection	Chris Andrews	The Oblong Plot	Puncher and Wattmann
Victorian Premier's Literary Awards	Jeanine Leane	Gawimarra: Gathering	University of Queensland Press
Western Australian Premier's Book Awards	Alan Fyfe	G-d, Sleep, and Chaos	Gazebo

=== Drama ===
Award	Category	Author	Title	Publisher
New South Wales Premier's Literary Awards	Script	Charles Williams	Inside	Simpatico Films, Macgowan Films, Never Sleep Pictures
New South Wales Premier's Literary Awards	Play	Glenn Shea	Three Magpies Perched in a Tree	Currency Press, with La Mama Theatre
Victorian Premier's Literary Awards		Nathan Maynard	37	Currency Press, with Melbourne Theatre Company
Patrick White Playwrights' Award	Award	Karolina Ristevski	River Was Here	Sydney Theatre Company
Patrick White Playwrights' Award	Fellowship	Sheridan Harbridge		

== Deaths ==
- 26 March — Kerry Greenwood, novelist and lawyer (born 1954)
- 19 April — Damien Broderick, sf novelist (born 1944)
- 5 May — Tracy Sorensen, novelist and academic (born 1963)
- 10 June — Leanne Frahm, sf author (born 1946)
- 6 August — David Dale, journalist and travel writer (born 1948)
- 27 August — Charmaine Papertalk Green, poet and artist (born 1962)
- 17 November — Robert Gray, poet and critic (born 1945)
- 11 December — Jean Bedford, novelist (born 1946 in Cambridge, England)
- 16 December — Chris Wallace-Crabbe, poet and academic (born 1934)

== See also ==
- 2025 in Australia
- 2025 in literature
- 2025 in poetry
- List of years in Australian literature
- List of years in literature
