= ARA Historical Novel Prize =

Annual literary award in Australia

The ARA Historical Novel Prize is the richest individual literary prize in Australia and New Zealand with prize monies of $150,000 across two categories. The winner of the Adult category receives $100,000 with the Children and Young Adult winner receiving $30,000. The two shortlisted authors in each category receive $5,000 each, while the winner of the Reader's Choice Award also receives $5,000. The prize is run by the Historical Novel Society Australasia in partnership with the sponsor, ARA Group.

The 2020 Prize only awarded novels in the Adult category. The Children and Young Adults category was introduced in 2021 and the Reader's Choice Award was first awarded in 2025 for longlisted novels in the Adult category.

== Definition ==
The Historical Novel Society Australasia explained the boundaries of the prize as follows: "The definition of the genre set by the Historical Novel Society Australasia (HNSA) is a novel in which the majority of the narrative, ie more than 50% of the events described, has taken place at least 50 years before publication.

"Historical sub-genres considered to be historical fiction include historical mystery, historical romance, and historical fantasy and alternate history. Time-slip novels, multiple-time period novels, and parallel narrative novels are also considered historical fiction with flexibility to crossover between eras stretching from 50 years or more in the past until contemporary times provided more than 50% of the events described take place at least 50 years before publication."

== Announcement ==
The longlists for the ARA Historical Novel Prize are announced in September, the shortlists in early October and the winners later in the same month.

== Nominated and winning works ==
=== Adult category ===
Year	Author	Title	Publisher	Result
2026
2026	Bernice Barry	The Names of a Hare	Fremantle Press	Winner
2026	Lauren Keenan	The Other Catherine	Penguin	Shortlisted
2026	Fiona Kelly McGregor	The Trap	Picador	Shortlisted
2026	Jeffery Buchanan	The Birds Began to Sing	Text Publishing	Longlisted
2026	Lauren Keegan	The Woman in the Seal Skin	Affirm Press	Longlisted
2026	Wayne Marshall	Henry Goes Bush	Picador	Longlisted
2026	Heather Rose	A Great Act of Love	Allen & Unwin	Longlisted
2026	A Rushby	Slashed Beauties	HQ Fiction	Longlisted
2026	Francesca de Tores	Cast Away	Bloomsbury	Longlisted
2025
2025	Robbie Arnott	Dusk	Picador	Joint Winners
2025	Tasma Walton	I Am Nannertgarrook	Bundyi	Joint Winners
2025	Malcolm Knox	The First Friend	Allen and Unwin	Shortlisted
2025	Matthew Hooton	Everything Lost, Everything Found	Fourth Estate	Longlisted
2025	Lauren Keegan	All the Bees in the Hollows	Affirm	Longlisted
2025	Emily Maguire	Rapture	Allen and Unwin	Longlisted
2025	Debra Oswald	One Hundred Years of Betty	Allen and Unwin	Longlisted
2025	Jane Yang	The Lotus Shoes	Sphere	Longlisted
2025	Emma Pei Yin	When Sleeping Women Wake	Hachette	Longlisted
2024
2024	Melissa Lucashenko	Edenglassie	University of Queensland Press	Winner
2024	Lenny Bartulin	The Unearthed	Allen and Unwin	Shortlisted
2024	Tony Birch	Women & Children	University of Queensland Press	Shortlisted
2024	Lauren Chater	The Beauties	Simon & Schuster	Longlisted
2024	Stephen Daisley	A Better Place	Text Publishing	Longlisted
2024	Kate Grenville	Restless Dolly Maunder	Text Publishing	Longlisted
2024	Jane Harrison	The Visitors	HarperCollins	Longlisted
2024	Natasha Lester	The Disappearance of Astrid Bricard	Hachette Australia	Longlisted
2024	Catherine McKinnon	To Sing of War	HarperCollins	Longlisted
2023
2023	Gail Jones	Salonika Burning	Text Publishing	Winner
2023	Fiona Kelly McGregor	Iris	Pan Macmillan	Shortlisted
2023	Jock Serong	The Settlement	Text Publishing	Shortlisted
2023	Robbie Arnott	Limberlost	Text Publishing	Longlisted
2023	Robyn Cadwallader	The Fire and the Rose	HarperCollins	Longlisted
2023	Robert Drewe	Nimblefoot	Hamish Hamilton	Longlisted
2023	Alison Goodman	The Benevolent Society of Ill-Mannered Ladies	HarperCollins	Longlisted
2023	Fiona McFarlane	The Sun Walks Down	Allen and Unwin	Longlisted
2023	Pip Williams	The Bookbinder of Jericho	Affirm Press	Longlisted
2022
2022	Tom Keneally	Corporal Hitler's Pistol	Penguin Books	Winner
2022	Geraldine Brooks	Horse	Hachette Australia	Shortlisted
2022	Robyn Mundy	Cold Coast	Ultimo Press	Shortlisted
2022	Karen Brooks	The Good Wife of Bath	HarperCollins	Longlisted
2022	Lauren Chater	The Winter Dress	Simon and Schuster	Longlisted
2022	Steven Carroll	Goodnight, Vivienne, Goodnight	HarperCollins	Longlisted
2022	Portland Jones	Only Bird Above	Fremantle Press	Longlisted
2022	Kim Kelly	The Rat Catcher	Brio Books	Longlisted
2022	David Whish-Wilson	Sawdust House	Fremantle Press	Longlisted
2021
2021	Jock Serong	The Burning Island	Text Publishing	Winner
2021	Anita Heiss	Bila Yarrudhanggalangdhuray	Simon and Schuster	Shortlisted
2021	Gail Jones	Our Shadows	Text Publishing	Shortlisted
2021	Stephen Conte	The Tolstoy Estate	HarperCollins	Longlisted
2021	Kate Grenville	A Room Made of Leaves	Text Publishing	Longlisted
2021	Anthony Hall	The Last Convict	Penguin Books	Longlisted
2021	Robert Horne	The Glass Harpoon	Ginninderra Press	Longlisted
2021	Ian Reid	The Madwoman's Coat	Framework Press	Longlisted
2021	Lyn Yeowart	The Silent Listener	Penguin Books	Longlisted
2020
2020	Mirandi Riwoe	Stone Sky Gold Mountain	University of Queensland Press	Winner
2020	Sienna Brown	Master of My Fate	Penguin Books	Shortlisted
2020	Catherine Jinks	Shepherd	Text Publishing	Shortlisted
2020	Nigel Featherstone	Bodies of Men	Hachette Australia	Longlisted
2020	Dominic Smith	The Electric Hotel	Allen and Unwin	Longlisted
2020	Christos Tsiolkas	Damascus	Allen and Unwin	Longlisted
2020	Pip Williams	The Dictionary of Lost Words	Affirm Press	Longlisted
2020	Tara June Winch	The Yield	Penguin Books	Longlisted

=== Children and Young Adult category ===
Year	Author	Title	Publisher	Result
2026
2026	Meg Caddy	A Flash in the Dust	University of Queensland Press	Winner
2026	Jackie French	Cleopatra: The Girl Who Would be King	HarperCollins	Shortlisted
2026	Claire Halifax	A House Divided	Walker Books	Shortlisted
2026	Maria Gill	A Flame in the Dark	One Tree House	Longlisted
2026	Lucie Stevens	Nanny Tobbins and the Midnight Plan	HarperCollins	Longlisted
2026	Sue Whiting	Hill End Gold	Walker Books	Longlisted
2025
2025	Suzanne Leal	The Year We Escaped	HarperCollins	Winner
2025	Anna Ciddor	Moonboy	Allen and Unwin	Shortlisted
2025	Judith Rossell	The Midwatch	HGCP	Shortlisted
2025	Helen Edwards	On Gallant Wings	Riveted	Longlisted
2025	Sophie Masson	Our History: Bold Ben Hall	Walker Books	Longlisted
2025	Catherine Norton	Hester Hitchins and the Falling Stars	HarperCollins	Longlisted
2025	Lucie Stevens	RIP Nanny Tobbins	HarperCollins	Longlisted
2025	Marly & Linda Wells	Desert Tracks	Magabala Books	Longlisted
2024
2024	Beverley McWilliams	Spies in the Sky	Pantera Press	Winner
2024	Jackie French	Secret Sparrow	HarperCollins	Shortlisted
2024	Rebecca Lim	Two Sparrowhawks in a Lonely Sky	Allen and Unwin	Shortlisted
2024	Nicki Greenburg	The Detective’s Guide to Paris	Affirm Press	Longlisted
2024	Katrina Nannestad	Silver Linings	ABC Books	Longlisted
2024	Catherine Norton	The Fortune Maker	HarperCollins	Longlisted
2024	Jackie Randall	Only Two	Self-Published	Longlisted
2023
2023	Amelia Mellor	The Bookseller's Apprentice	Affirm Press	Winner
2023	Suzanne Leal	Running with Ivan	HarperCollins	Shortlisted
2023	Katrina Nannestad	Waiting for the Storks	ABC Books	Shortlisted
2023	Jackie French	The Great Gallipoli Escape	HarperCollins	Longlisted
2023	Ellie Marney	The Killing Code	Allen and Unwin	Longlisted
2023	Lystra Rose	The Upwelling	Hachette Australia	Longlisted
2023	Pamela Rushby	The Mud Puddlers	Walker Books	Longlisted
2023	Philippa Werry	Iris and Me	Ahoy! An Imprint of The Cuba Press	Longlisted
2023	Sue Whiting	Tilda	Walker Books	Longlisted
2022
2022	Katrina Nannestad	Rabbit, Soldier, Angel, Thief	HarperCollins	Winner
2022	Brian Falkner	Katipo Joe: Wolf’s Lair	Scholastic New Zealand	Shortlisted
2022	Claire Saxby	The Wearing of the Green	Walker Books	Shortlisted
2022	Felice Arena	The Unstoppable Flying Flanagan	Penguin Books	Longlisted
2022	Meg Caddy	Slipping the Noose	Text Publishing	Longlisted
2022	Chloe Gong	Our Violent Ends	Hachette New Zealand	Longlisted
2022	Lauren Keenan	Amorangi and Millie’s Trip Through Time	Huia Publishing	Longlisted
2022	David Metzenthen	Augustin and the Hot Air Balloon	Ford Street Publishing	Longlisted
2022	Pamela Rushby	The Secret Battle	Eagle Books	Longlisted
2021
2021	Katrina Nannestad	We are Wolves	ABC Books	Winner
2021	Amelia Mellor	The Grandest Bookshop in the World	Affirm Press	Shortlisted
2021	Pamela Rushby	The Mummy Smugglers of Crumblin Castle	Walker Books	Shortlisted
2021	Anna Ciddor	The Boy Who Stepped Through Time	Allen and Unwin	Longlisted
2021	Jackie French	Night Ride into Danger	HarperCollins	Longlisted
2021	Suzanne Gervay	Heroes of the Secret Underground	HarperCollins	Longlisted
2021	Nicki Greenberg	The Detective’s Guide to Ocean Travel	Affirm Press	Longlisted
2021	Cameron Nunn	Echo in the Memory	Walker Books	Longlisted
2021	Richard Yaxley	Harmony	Scholastic	Longlisted

=== Reader's Choice Award ===
Year	Author	Title	Publisher	Result
2026	Wayne Marshall	Henry Goes Bush	Picador	Winner
2025	Emily Maguire	Rapture	Allen and Unwin	Winner
