= Indie Book Awards Book of the Year – Children's =

Prize category in Australian book awards

The Indie Book Awards Book of the Year – Children's is a prize category in the annual Indie Book Awards (Australia) presented by Australian Independent Booksellers.

The award was established in 2016. The works considered for this award were originally included under the scope of the Indie Book Awards Book of the Year – Children's & YA from 2008-2015. In 2016 that award was split into two separate awards (Indie Book Awards Book of the Year – Children's and Indie Book Awards Book of the Year – Young Adult).

== Winners and shortlists ==
=== 2016–2019 ===
Indie Book Awards Book of the Year – Children's
Year	Author	Title	Result	Ref.
2016	Aaron Blabey	The Bad Guys: Episode 1	Winner	
2016	Katrina Nannestad & Lucia Masciullo	Olive of Groves	Finalist	
2016	Andy Griffiths & Terry Denton (illus)	The 65-Storey Treehouse	Finalist	
2016	Shaun Tan	The Singing Bones	Finalist	
2017	Jeannie Baker	Circle	Winner	
2017	Aaron Blabey	Pig the Winner	Finalist	
2017	Andy Griffiths & Terry Denton (illus)	The 78-Storey Treehouse	Finalist	
2017	Judith Rossell	Wormwood Mire	Finalist	
2018	Jessica Townsend	Nevermoor: The Trials of Morrigan Crow	Winner	
2018	Aaron Blabey	Pig the Star	Finalist	
2018	Mem Fox & Ronojoy Ghosh (Illus)	I'm Australian Too	Finalist	
2018	Sally Rippin	Polly and Buster: The Wayward Witch and the Feelings Monster	Finalist	
2019	Karen Foxlee	Lenny's Book of Everything	Winner	
2019	Davina Bell & Allison Colpoys (illus)	All the Ways to be Smart	Finalist	
2019	Shaun Tan	Tales from the Inner City	Finalist	
2019	Jessica Townsend	Wundersmith: The Calling of Morrigan Crow	Finalist	

=== 2020– ===
Indie Book Awards Book of the Year – Children's
Year	Author	Title	Result	Ref.
2020	Sami Bayly	The Illustrated Encyclopaedia of Ugly Animals	Winner	
2020	Anh Do & Jeremy Ley (illus)	Into the Wild: Wolf Girl Book 1	Finalist	
2020	Mem Fox & Freya Blackwood (illus)	The Tiny Star	Finalist	
2020	Bruce Pascoe	Young Dark Emu: A Truer History	Finalist	
2021	Amelia Mellor	The Grandest Bookshop in the World	Winner	
2021	Sami Bayly	The Illustrated Encyclopaedia of Dangerous Animals	Finalist	
2021	Jane Godwin & Alison Lester (illus)	Sing Me The Summer	Finalist	
2021	Jessica Townsend	Hollowpox: The Hunt for Morrigan Crow	Finalist	
2022	Katrina Nannestad	Rabbit, Soldier, Angel, Thief	Winner	
2022	Karen Foxlee	Dragon Skin	Finalist	
2022	Adam Goodes and Ellie Laing & David Hardy (illus)	Somebody's Land: Welcome to Our Country	Finalist	
2022	Favel Parrett	Wandi	Finalist	
2023	Craig Silvey	Runt	Winner	
2023	Sean E. Avery	Frank's Red Hat	Finalist	
2023	Adam Goodes and Ellie Laing & David Hardy (illus)	Somebody's Land: Welcome to Our Country	Finalist	
2023	Jordan Gould and Richard Pritchard	Guardians: Wylah the Koorie Warrior 1	Finalist	
2024	Jaclyn Moriarty	The Impossible Secret of Lillian Velvet	Winner	
2024	Amelia McInerney & Lucinda Gifford	Neil, the Amazing Sea Cucumber	Finalist	
2024	Katrina Nannestad	Silver Linings	Finalist	
2024	Favel Parrett	Kimmi	Finalist	
2025	Katrina Nannestad	All the Beautiful Things	Winner	
2025	Kate Mildenhall and Jess Racklyeft (illus.)	To Stir With Love	Finalist	
2025	Judith Rossell	The Midwatch	Finalist	
2025	Stuart Wilson	The 113th Assistant Librarian	Finalist	
2026	Jessica Townsend	Silverborn: The Mystery of Morrigan Crow	Winner	
2026	Annabel Crabb, illustrated by First Dog on the Moon	There’s a Prawn in Parliament House: The Kids' Guide to Australia’s Amazing Democracy	Finalist	
2026	Fiona McIntosh, illustrated by Sara Acton	Harry and Gran Bake a Cake	Finalist	
