= 2024 in Australian literature =

This is a list of historical events and publications of Australian literature during 2024.

== Events ==
- Both the chief executive and deputy chairman quit over promotional material released for the 2024 Melbourne Writers Festival
- Major Australian online bookseller Booktopia enters voluntary administration as it explores options for "sale and/or recapitalisation."

== Major publications ==
=== Literary fiction ===
- Jumaana Abdu – Translations
- Robbie Arnott – Dusk
- Amy Brown – My Brilliant Sister
- Brian Castro – Chinese Postman
- Shankari Chandran – Safe Haven
- Melanie Cheng – The Burrow
- Charmian Clift – The End of the Morning
- Michelle de Kretser – Theory & Practice
- Winnie Dunn – Dirt Poor Islanders
- David Dyer – This Kingdom of Dust
- Nikki Gemmell – Wing
- Rodney Hall – Vortex
- Dylin Hardcastle – A Language of Limbs
- Anita Heiss – Dirrayawadha
- Kirsty Iltners – Depth of Field
- Julie Janson – Compassion
- Gail Jones – One Another
- Lauren Keegan – All the Bees in the Hollows
- Meg Keneally – Free
- Kate Kruimink – Heartsease
- Siang Lu – Ghost Cities
- Emily Maguire – Rapture
- Alex Miller – The Deal
- Stephen Orr – Shining Like the Sun
- Jock Serong – Cherrywood
- Inga Simpson – The Thinning
- Nardi Simpson – The Belburd
- Tim Winton – Juice

=== Short story collections ===
- Ceridwen Dovey – Only the Astronauts
- Fiona McFarlane – Highway 13
- Mykaela Saunders – Always Will Be

=== Crime and mystery ===
- Garry Disher – Sanctuary
- Candice Fox – Devil's Kitchen
- Sulari Gentill – The Mystery Writer
- Chris Hammer – The Valley
- Margaret Hickey – The Creeper
- Lisa Kenway – All You Took From Me
- Dervla McTiernan – What Happened to Nina?
- Louise Milligan – Pheasants Nest
- Vikki Wakefield – To the River

=== Science fiction and Fantasy ===
- Greg Egan
  - "Death and the Gorgon"
  - Morphotrophic
- Kate Forsyth – Psyckhe
- Ben Peek – "Shadow Films"
- Angela Slatter – The Briar Book of the Dead
- Kaaron Warren – The Underhistory

=== Children's and young adult ===
- Kate Emery – My Family and Other Suspects
- Ambelin Kwaymullina – Liar's Test
- Emma Lord – Anomaly
- Katrina Nannestad – All the Beautiful Things
- Krystal Sutherland – The Invocations
- Lili Wilkinson – Deep is the Fen

=== Poetry ===
- Chris Andrews – The Oblong Plot
- Manisha Anjali – Naag Mountain
- Judith Beveridge – Tintinnabulum
- David Brooks – The Other Side of Daylight: New and Selected Poems
- Hasib Hourani – rock flight
- Nam Le – 36 Ways of Writing a Vietnamese Poem
- Jeanine Leane – gawimarra gathering
- Kate Middleton – Television
- Izzy Roberts-Orr – Raw Salt

=== Plays ===
- Patricia Cornelius – Bad Boy
- Glenn Shea – Three Magpies Perched in a Tree
- Melanie Tait – The Queen's Nanny
- David Williamson – The Great Divide

=== Non-Fiction ===
- James Bradley – Deep Water
- Criss Canning – The Paintings of Criss Canning
- Santilla Chingaipe – Black Convicts
- Helen Ennis – Max Dupain: A Portrait
- Helen Garner – The Season
- Royce Kurmelovs – Slick: Australia's Toxic Relationship with Big Oil
- Amy McQuire – Black Witness
- Cameron K. Murray – The Great Housing Hijack
- Lucia Osborne-Crowley – The Lasting Harm: Witnessing the Trial of Ghislaine Maxwell
- Cher Tan – Peripathetic : Notes on (Un)belonging

=== Memoir ===
- Abbas El-Zein – Bullet, Paper, Rock
- Susan Hampton – Anything Can Happen
- Samah Sabawi – Cactus Pear for My Beloved
- Markus Zusak – Three Wild Dogs and the Truth

== Awards and honours ==
Note: these awards were presented in the year in question.

=== Lifetime achievement ===
Award	Author
Melbourne Prize for Literature	Alexis Wright
Mona Brand Award	Belinda Chayko
Patrick White Award	Pi O

=== Literary ===
Award	Author	Title	Publisher
ALS Gold Medal	Alexis Wright	Praiseworthy	Giramondo Publishing
Colin Roderick Award	Melissa Lucashenko	Edenglassie	University of Queensland Press
Indie Book Awards Book of the Year	David Marr	Killing for Country: A Family Story	Black Inc
New South Wales Premier's Literary Awards	Ali Cobby Eckermann	She Is the Earth	Magabala Books
Stella Prize	Alexis Wright	Praiseworthy	Giramondo Publishing
Victorian Premier's Literary Awards	Grace Yee	Chinese Fish	Giramondo Publishing

=== Fiction ===
Award	Author	Title	Publisher
Adelaide Festival Awards for Literature	SJ Norman	Permafrost	University of Queensland Press
The Age Book of the Year	Tony Birch	Women & Children	University of Queensland Press
ARA Historical Novel Prize	Melissa Lucashenko	Edenglassie	University of Queensland Press
The Australian/Vogel Literary Award	Kristina Ross	First Year	Allen and Unwin
Barbara Jefferis Award (joint winners)	Sara M. Saleh	Songs for the Dead and the Living	Affirm
Barbara Jefferis Award (joint winners)	Lucy Treloar	Days of Innocence and Wonder	Picador
Indie Book Awards Book of the Year – Fiction	Melissa Lucashenko	Edenglassie	University of Queensland Press
Indie Book Awards Book of the Year – Debut Fiction	Jane Harrison	The Visitors	Fourth Estate
Miles Franklin Award	Alexis Wright	Praiseworthy	Giramondo Publishing
Prime Minister's Literary Awards	Andre Dao	Anam	Hamish Hamilton
New South Wales Premier's Literary Awards	Angela O'Keeffe	The Sitter	University of Queensland Press
Queensland Literary Awards	Sharlene Allsopp	The Great Undoing	Ultimo
Victorian Premier's Literary Awards	Melissa Lucashenko	Edenglassie	University of Queensland Press
Voss Literary Prize	Alexis Wright	Praiseworthy	Giramondo

=== Children and Young Adult ===
Award	Category	Author	Title	Publisher
ARA Historical Novel Prize	Children and Young Adult	Beverley McWilliams	Spies in the Sky	Pantera Press
Children's Book of the Year Award	Older Readers	Karen Comer	Grace Notes	Lothian
Children's Book of the Year Award	Younger Readers	Tristan Bancks	Scar Town	Puffin
Children's Book of the Year Award	Picture Book	Kelly Canby	Timeless	Fremantle Press
Children's Book of the Year Award	Early Childhood	Briony Stewart	Gymnastica Fantastica!	Lothian
Children's Book of the Year Award	Eve Pownall Award for Information Books	Isolde Martyn & Robyn Ridgeway, illus by Louise Hogan	Country Town	Fremantle Press
Indie Book Awards Book of the Year	Children's	Jaclyn Moriarty	The Impossible Secret of Lillian Velvet	Allen & Unwin
Indie Book Awards Book of the Year	Young Adult	Melissa Kang & Yumi Stynes	Welcome to Sex	Hardie Grant
Prime Minister's Literary Awards	Children's	Violet Wadrill, Topsy Dodd Ngarnjal, Leah Leaman, Cecelia Edwards, Cassandra Algy, Felicity Meakins, Briony Barr & Gregory Crocetti	Tamarra: A Story of Termites on Gurindji Country	Hardie Grant
Prime Minister's Literary Awards	Young Adult	Will Kostakis	We Could Be Something	Allen & Unwin
New South Wales Premier's Literary Awards	Children's	Levi Pinfold	Paradise Sands: A story of enchantment	Walker Books
New South Wales Premier's Literary Awards	Young People's	Helena Fox	The Quiet and the Loud	Pan Macmillan Australia
Queensland Literary Awards	Children's	Karen Comer	Sunshine on Vinegar Street	Allen & Unwin
Queensland Literary Awards	Young Adult	sydney knoo	The Spider and Her Demons	Penguin
Victorian Premier's Literary Awards	Young Adult Fiction	Lili Wilkinson	A Hunger of Thorns	Allen & Unwin
Western Australian Premier's Book Awards	Children's	Dianne Wolfer	Scout and the Rescue Dogs	Walker Books

=== Crime and Mystery ===
==== National ====
Award	Category	Author	Title	Publisher
Davitt Award	Novel	Monica Vuu	When One of Us Hurts	Pan Macmillan
Davitt Award	Young adult novel	Amy Doak	Eleanor Jones Is Not a Murderer	Penguin Books
Davitt Award	Children's novel	Lucinda Gifford	The Wolves of Greycoat Hall	Walker Books
Davitt Award	Non-fiction	Rebecca Hazel	The Schoolgirl, Her Teacher and His Wife	Vintage Books
Davitt Award	Debut	Christine Keighery	The Half Brother	Ultimo
Davitt Award	Readers' choice	Alison Goodman	The Benevolent Society of Ill-Mannered Ladies	HarperCollins
Ned Kelly Award	Novel	Sally Hepworth	Darling Girls	Pan Macmillan
Ned Kelly Award	First novel	Matt Francis	Murder in the Pacific: Ifira Point	Big Sky Publishing
Ned Kelly Award	True crime	Nick McKenzie	Crossing the Line	Hachette Australia

=== Non-Fiction ===
Award	Category	Author	Title	Publisher
The Age Book of the Year	Non-Fiction	Ross McMullin	Life So Full of Promise	Scribe
Indie Book Awards Book of the Year	Non-Fiction	David Marr	Killing for Country: A Family Story	Black Inc
Indie Book Awards Book of the Year	Illustrated Non-Fiction	Wendy Cooper	The Bird Art of William T. Cooper	National Library of Australia
National Biography Award	Biography	Lamisse Hamouda	The Shape of Dust: a father wrongly imprisoned. A daughter's quest to free him	Pantera Press
Prime Minister's Literary Awards	Non-Fiction	Daniel Browning	Close to the Subject: Selected Works	Magabala Books
Prime Minister's Literary Awards	Australian History	Ryan Cropp	Donald Horne: A Life in the Lucky Country	La Trobe University Press
New South Wales Premier's Literary Awards	Non-Fiction	Christine Kenneally	Ghosts of the Orphanage	Hachette Australia
New South Wales Premier's History Awards	Australian History	Alecia Simmonds	Courting: An Intimate History of Love and the Law	La Trobe University Press, with Black Inc
New South Wales Premier's History Awards	Community and Regional History	Shauna Bostock	Reaching Through Time: Finding my family's stories	Allen & Unwin
New South Wales Premier's History Awards	General History	Katharine E. McGregor	Systemic Silencing: Activism, Memory, and Sexual Violence in Indonesia	University of Wisconsin Press
Queensland Literary Awards	Non-Fiction	Abbas El-Zein	Bullet, Paper, Rock: A Memoir of Words and Wars	Upswell
Victorian Premier's Literary Awards	Non-Fiction	Ellen van Neerven	Personal Score: Sport, Culture, Identity	University of Queensland Press

=== Poetry ===
Award	Author	Title	Publisher
Adelaide Festival Awards for Literature	Gavin Yuan Gao	At the Altar of Touch	University of Queensland Press
Anne Elder Award	Sara M. Saleh	The Flirtation of Girls/Ghazal el-Banat	University of Queensland Press
Mary Gilmore Award	Dan Hogan	Secret Third Thing	Cordite Books
Prime Minister's Literary Awards	Amy Crutchfield	The Cyprian	Giramondo Publishing
New South Wales Premier's Literary Awards	Tais Rose Wae	Riverbed Sky Songs	Vagabond Press
Judith Wright Calanthe Award for a Poetry Collection	L. K. Holt	Three Books	Vagabond Press
Victorian Premier's Literary Awards	Grace Yee	Chinese Fish	Giramondo Publishing

=== Drama ===
Award	Category	Author	Title	Publisher
New South Wales Premier's Literary Awards	Script	Anna Barnes	Safe Home, Episode 1	Kindling Pictures
New South Wales Premier's Literary Awards	Play	Nicholas Brown	Sex Magick	Griffin Theatre Company & Currency Press
Victorian Premier's Literary Awards		S. Shakthidharan and Eamon Flack	The Jungle and the Sea	Belvoir St Theatre & Currency Press
Patrick White Playwrights' Award	Award	Not awarded		
Patrick White Playwrights' Award	Fellowship	Not awarded		

== Deaths ==
- 13 January – David Hansen, art historian (born 1958)
- 4 February – Lowitja O'Donoghue, public administrator and Indigenous rights advocate (born 1932)
- 19 February – Marion Halligan, novelist, short story writer, reviewer and essayist (born 1940)
- 25 March – Ian Heads, historian and journalist (born 1943)
- 30 April – Lyndall Ryan, historian (born 1943)
- 10 May – Hugh Edwards, journalist, author and marine photographer (born 1933 in Scotland)
- 24 July – Ray Lawler, playwright (born 1921)
- 31 August – Jack Hibberd, playwright (born 1940)
- 4 October – Barbara Blackman, writer, essayist, poet, librettist, broadcaster and philanthropist (born 1928)
- 7 November – Eric Beach, poet (born 1947, in New Zealand)
- 30 November – Susan Duncan, journalist, memoirist and novelist (born 1951)
- 10 December – Brenda Walker, novelist (born 1957)
- 18 December – John Marsden, writer and teacher (born 1950)

Unknown date

- Eric Beach, poet and playwright (born in New Zealand, 1947)

== See also ==
- 2024 in Australia
- 2024 in literature
- 2024 in poetry
- List of years in Australian literature
- List of years in literature
