= 2026 in Australian literature =

This is a list of historical events and publications of Australian literature during 2026.

== Major publications ==
=== Literary fiction ===
- Michael Mohammed Ahmad – Bugger
- Yumna Kassab – Goodbye, My Love
- Amanda Lohrey – Capture
- Fiona Kelly McGregor – The Trap
- Steve Toltz – A Rising of the Lights
- Sarah Walker – The Water Takes
- Chloe Wilson – The Thornbacks
- Michael Winkler – Griefdogg
- Fiona Wright – Kill Your Boomers

=== Science fiction and fantasy ===
- John Morrissey – Bird Deity

=== Poetry ===
- Beverley Farmer – For the Season : Haikus
- Lulu Houdini – ma-li
- Maria van Neerven – Two Tongues

=== Non-Fiction ===
- Tyree Barnett – Stolen Man on Stolen Land
- Bob Carr – Bring Back Yesterday
- Charlotte Grieve – Duty to Warn
- Susan Lever – A. D. Hope : A Life
- Konrad Marshall – Run For Your Life
- Alan Joyce — Alan Joyce: Riding the Jet Stream

== Awards and honours ==
Note: these awards were presented in the year in question.

=== Lifetime achievement ===
| Award | Author |
|---|---|
| Patrick White Award | Michael Farrell (poet) |

=== Literary ===
| Award | Author | Title | Publisher |
|---|---|---|---|
| ALS Gold Medal | Madeleine Watts | Elegy, Southwest | Ultimo Press |
| Colin Roderick Award | Not yet awarded | | |
| Indie Book Awards Book of the Year | Charlotte McConaghy | Wild Dark Shore | Penguin |
| New South Wales Premier's Literary Awards | Clare Wright | Näku Dhäruk The Bark Petitions | Text Publishing |
| Stella Prize | Lee Lai | Cannon | Giramondo |
| Victorian Premier's Literary Awards | Evelyn Araluen | The Rot | University of Queensland Press |

=== Fiction ===
| Award | Author | Title | Publisher |
|---|---|---|---|
| Adelaide Festival Awards for Literature | Not awarded | | |
| The Age Book of the Year | Moreno Giovannoni | The Immigrants | Black Inc. |
| ARA Historical Novel Prize | Bernice Barry | The Names of a Hare | Fremantle Press |
| Barbara Jefferis Award | Not yet awarded | | |
| Indie Book Awards Book of the Year – Fiction | Charlotte McConaghy | Wild Dark Shore | Penguin |
| Indie Book Awards Book of the Year – Debut Fiction | Emma Pei Yin | When Sleeping Women Wake | Hachette Australia |
| Miles Franklin Award | Omar Musa | Fierceland | Penguin Random House |
| Prime Minister's Literary Awards | Leonie Norrington, Merrkiyawuy Ganambarr-Stubbs, Djawa Burarrwanga & Djawundil Maymuru | A Piece of Red Cloth | Allen & Unwin |
| New South Wales Premier's Literary Awards | Moreno Giovannoni | The Immigrants | Black Inc. |
| Queensland Literary Awards | Claire Thomas | On Not Climbing Mountains | Hachette Australia |
| Victorian Premier's Literary Awards | Omar Musa | Fierceland | Penguin |
| Voss Literary Prize | Not yet awarded | | |

=== Children and Young Adult ===
| Award | Category | Author | Title | Publisher |
|---|---|---|---|---|
| ARA Historical Novel Prize | Children and Young Adult | Meg Caddy | A Flash in the Dust | University of Queensland Press |
| Children's Book of the Year Award | Older Readers | Barry Jonsberg | Darkest Night, Brightest Star | Allen & Unwin Children's |
| Children's Book of the Year Award | Younger Readers | Karen Wasson, illus. Jake A Minton | Inked | Figment Books |
| Children's Book of the Year Award | Picture Book | Zeno Sworder | Once I Was a Giant | Thames and Hudson |
| Children's Book of the Year Award | Early Childhood | Rae Tan | The Emperor's Egg | Lothian |
| Children's Book of the Year Award | Eve Pownall Award for Information Books | Stephanie Owen Reeder | Peculiar Parents | National Library of Australia Publishing |
| Indie Book Awards Book of the Year | Children's | Jessica Townsend | Silverborn | Lothian |
| Indie Book Awards Book of the Year | Young Adult | Amy Doak | Eleanor Jones Is Playing with Fire | Penguin |
| Prime Minister's Literary Awards | Children's | Zana Fraillon | Song of a Thousand Seas | University of Queensland Press |
| Prime Minister's Literary Awards | Young Adult | Pip Harry | Drift | Lothian Children's Books |
| New South Wales Premier's Literary Awards | Children's | Michel Streich | Gone | Thames and Hudson |
| New South Wales Premier's Literary Awards | Young People's | Marly Wells and Linda Wells | Desert Tracks | Magabala Books |
| Queensland Literary Awards | Children's | Zeno Sworder | Once I Was a Giant | Thames and Hudson |
| Queensland Literary Awards | Young Adult | Julianne Negri | The Belly of a Wolf | UWA Publishing |
| Victorian Premier's Literary Awards | Children's | Zeno Sworder | Once I Was a Giant | Thames and Hudson |
| Victorian Premier's Literary Awards | Young Adult | Margot McGovern | This Stays Between Us | Penguin |

=== Crime and Mystery ===
==== National ====
| Award | Category | Author | Title | Publisher |
|---|---|---|---|---|
| Davitt Award | Novel | Joanna Jenkins | The Bluff | Allen & Unwin |
| Davitt Award | Young adult novel | Amy Doak | What Have They Done to Liza McLean? | Penguin |
| Davitt Award | Children's novel | Sarah Armstrong | Run | Hardie Grant |
| Davitt Award | Non-fiction | Kate Wild | The Red House | Allen & Unwin |
| Davitt Award | Debut | Angie Faye Martin | Melaleuca | HQ Fiction |
| Davitt Award | Readers' choice | Sally Hepworth | Mad Mabel | Pan Macmillan |
| Ned Kelly Award | Novel | Sally Hepworth | Mad Mabel | Pan Macmillan |
| Ned Kelly Award | First novel | Liz Allan | In Bloom | Sceptre |
| Ned Kelly Award | True crime | Charlotte Grieve | Duty to Warn | Hachette Australia |

=== Poetry ===
| Award | Author | Title | Publisher |
|---|---|---|---|
| Adelaide Festival Awards for Literature | Not awarded | | |
| Anne Elder Award | Ender Baskan | Two Hundred Million Musketeers | Giramondo |
| Mary Gilmore Award | Liv Moriarty | Gravity and Gravel | No More Poetry |
| Prime Minister's Literary Awards | Ender Başkan | Two Hundred Million Musketeers | Giramondo |
| New South Wales Premier's Literary Awards | Jill Jones | How to Emerge | Vagabond Books |
| Judith Wright Calanthe Award for a Poetry Collection | Eunice Andrada | KONTRA | Giramondo Publishing |
| Victorian Premier's Literary Awards | Eunice Andrada | KONTRA | Giramondo Publishing |

=== Drama ===
| Award | Category | Author | Title | Publisher |
|---|---|---|---|---|
| New South Wales Premier's Literary Awards | Script | Shaun Grant | The Narrow Road to the Deep North, Episode 4 | Curio Pictures, Screen Australia, Amazon MGM Studios |
| New South Wales Premier's Literary Awards | Play | Andrea James | The Black Woman of Gippsland | Melbourne Theatre Company/Currency Press |
| Victorian Premier's Literary Awards | | Emilie Collyer | Super | Currency Press |
| Patrick White Playwrights' Award | Award | Not yet awarded | | |
| Patrick White Playwrights' Award | Fellowship | Not yet awarded | | |

=== Non-Fiction ===
| Award | Category | Author | Title | Publisher |
|---|---|---|---|---|
| Adelaide Festival Awards for Literature | Non-Fiction | Not awarded | | |
| The Age Book of the Year | Non-Fiction | Kate Wild | The Red House | Allen & Unwin |
| Indie Book Awards Book of the Year | Non-Fiction | Hannah Kent | Always Home, Always Homesick | Picador |
| Indie Book Awards Book of the Year | Illustrated Non-Fiction | Tim Pilgrim | Wild by Design | Murdoch |
| National Biography Award | Biography | Helen Ennis | Max Dupain: A Portrait | 4th Estate |
| Prime Minister's Literary Awards | Non-Fiction | Kate Wild | The Red House | Allen & Unwin |
| New South Wales Premier's Literary Awards | Non-Fiction | Clare Wright | Näku Dhäruk The Bark Petitions | Text Publishing |
| New South Wales Premier's History Awards | Australian History | Natalie Harkin | Apron-Sorrow / Sovereign-Tea | Wakefield Press |
| New South Wales Premier's History Awards | Community and Regional History | Mark Skelsey | Views to Die For | Trafalgar Publishing |
| New South Wales Premier's History Awards | General History | Patricia A. O'Brien | Errol Flynn: The true story of Australia's Hollywood icon | Allen & Unwin |
| Queensland Literary Awards | Non-Fiction | Micaela Sahhar | Find Me at the Jaffa Gate: An Encyclopaedia of a Palestinian Family | NewSouth Publishing |
| Victorian Premier's Literary Awards | Non-Fiction | Micaela Sahhar | Find Me at the Jaffa Gate: An Encyclopaedia of a Palestinian Family | NewSouth Publishing |

== Deaths ==
- 29 January – Heather Goodall, historian and biographer (born 1950)
- 7 February – John Flanagan, fantasy author (born 1944)
- 12 February – Lionel Fogarty, poet (born 1958)
- 9 March – Patricia Clarke, historian, journalist and writer (born 1926)
- 22 April – David Malouf, poet and novelist (born 1934)
- 25 April – Annette Macarthur-Onslow, writer and book illustrator (born 1933)
- 13 July – Barry Dickins, author and playwright (born 1949)
- 9 September – Blanche d'Alpuget, writer (b. 1944)
- 21 September – Terry Denton, children's writer and illustrator (born 1950)
- 1 October – Hilary McPhee, publisher and editor (born 1941)

== See also ==
- 2026 in Australia
- 2026 in literature
- 2026 in poetry
- List of years in Australian literature
- List of years in literature
