= Anna Ciddor =

Australian author and illustrator

Anna Ciddor (born January 1957) is an Australian author and illustrator.

Ciddor is an ambassador for Oz Kids, an organisation to promote and support children's literary and artistic talents and was an ambassador for Australia Reads 2021–2023. In 2021 she won the Nance Donkin Award for Children's Literature. In 2023 she was the judge for the Boroondara Literary Awards (Young Writers' Prose). In 2024 she was Chair and judge for the ARA Historical Novel Society of Australasia CYA Award. Her newest book, Moonboy, has been shortlisted for the ARA Historical Novel Prize CYA category, was the Aurealis Awards for Best Children's Fiction finalist 2026, longlisted for the Book Links Children's Historical Fiction Award and was awarded a Notable Book by the Children's Book Council of Australia in 2026.

== Biography ==
Ciddor was born in January 1957 in Melbourne. She was brought up in a house without television, and had an inventive and creative childhood. She also had a strong interest in mathematics, and after finishing school, she obtained a Bachelor of Arts degree with a major in mathematics from the University of Melbourne and a Diploma of Education from Melbourne State College. Her first career was as a senior school mathematics teacher, and it was only after marrying and having children that she began writing and illustrating.

Her first book accepted for publication was a picture book,Take Me Back, published in 1988. This book took the reader back in time to show how people lived in Australia in the past. For the next few years, Ciddor continued to write and illustrate non-fiction books, concentrating on bringing history to life for children. In 2002 Allen and Unwin published her first historical fantasy, Runestone, book 1 of Viking Magic. This children's novel, and the other Viking Magic books that followed, use historical details and strong storylines.

In 2005 Ciddor was awarded a two-year grant by the Literature Board of the Australia Council.

Ciddor based her fantasy books on global folk, fairy tale, and myth as well as research into historic lifestyle and belief systems. At the Melbourne Writers Festival in 2007 Ciddor appeared on a panel with Sophie Masson and Kate Forsyth discussing the historical truth behind their fantasy novels. In a study of Canadian children's fantasy, author K.V. Johansen included a chapter on Ciddor's Viking Magic books because 'Although not by a Canadian author, the Viking Magic series is noteworthy' and 'does more towards realistic historical fiction than many "time-travel to learn history" novels'.

In 2016 Ciddor changed to historical fiction with the release of The Family with Two Front Doors, published by Allen and Unwin. It won a Notable Book Award from the Children's Book Council of Australia in March 2017. The Family with Two Front Doors is based on interviews with the author's grandmother Nomi Rabinovitch, and tells the story of Nomi's childhood as the daughter of a rabbi in 1920s Lublin, Poland. The writing style is inspired by Little House on the Prairie, presenting vignettes of the everyday life of a family. The book combines historical fact and imagination but no fantasy elements. According to a review by the Victorian Association for the Teaching of English, it is "an informative, gentle read' that "offers insight into how a Jewish household is run". Unlike most books about the Jewish past, this one does not focus on the Holocaust and "there is... no violence and no hatred... but a charming reconstruction of daily routines". Readings Bookstore, winners of the international Bookstore of the Year Award described The Family with Two Front Doors as a modern counterpart to the classic book Little Women. It was published in the US by Kar-Ben, a division of Lerner Books in 2018, and chosen as a Junior Library Guild Selection. In 2019 it was translated into Polish as Dwoje drzwi i dziewięcioro dzieci and published in Poland by Mamania .

Ciddor's book, 52 Mondays, published by Allen and Unwin in 2019, is a fictionalised account of Ciddor's own childhood, filled with memories of Melbourne in the 1960s. It was shortlisted for the 2019 REAL Awards, longlisted for the inaugural Book Links Award for Children's Historical Fiction.

Ciddor's next venture was into two time-slip novels about Ancient Rome. The historical details for both novels were provided by Tamara Lewit who is an archaeologist and historian specialising in Ancient Rome. In A Message Through Time, published by Allen and Unwin in 2023, ‘the relationships between the characters ... provides some rich discussion and reflection for readers ... clear themes of gender roles, wealth and privilege, resilience, ingenuity, the issues of slavery and moral compass/conscience as well as rich historical details.' It is a standalone companion to The Boy Who Stepped Through Time, published by Allen and Unwin in 2021. The Boy Who Stepped Through Time was long listed for the ARA Historical Novel Prize in 2021 and shortlisted for the Aurealis Awards for Best Children's Fiction in 2022.

In 2021 Ciddor won the Nance Donkin award for Children's Literature.

In 2024 Ciddor was Chair and judge for the ARA Historical Novel Society of Australasia CYA Award.

Moonboy, a time slip novel about a modern girl slipping back to 1969 at the time of the Apollo 11 mission, was published by Allen and Unwin in 2025. It was shortlisted for the ARA Historical Novel Society of Australasia CYA award in 2025. The judges commented that it "poses an unstated but increasingly urgent question in our society today: what if there was no history at all? What if it was rewritten or forgotten? Can memorabilia, the material treasures, help retrieve a life story?" Lamont Books chose it as their Primary Fiction Book of the Month, explaining it offers a "close up of what life was like in 1969 and the huge changes that have occurred since then, especially in technology, but also to things like behaviour, family life and schooling that will make the kids of today think...The story also handles Grampa’s dementia and how Letty, now Charlotte, brings a spark back into Grampa’s life when she shares his memories and special treasure box items. This is a wonderful read, with a historical setting and themes that will open discussions on many topics." In February 2026 it was a finalist for the Aurealis Awards for Best Children's Fiction published in 2025 , chosen as a Notable Book by the Children's Book Council of Australia in 2026 and longlisted for the Book Links Children's Historical Fiction Award

Ciddor has written and illustrated over fifty books.

== Awards ==
- Moonboy - ARA Historical Novel Society of Australasia CYA award 2025 short list, Aurealis Awards for Best Children's Fiction finalist 2026 , Notable Book, Children's Book Council of Australia in 2026 and Book Links Children's Historical Fiction Longlist 2026
- Nance Donkin Award for Children's Literature winner 2021
- The Boy Who Stepped Through Time – ARA Historical Novel Prize long list 2021 Aurealis Award for Best Children's Fiction short list
- 52 Mondays – shortlisted for the 2019 REAL Awards, longlisted for the inaugural Book Links Award for Children's Historical Fiction
- The Family with Two Front Doors – Notable Book, Children's Book Council of Australia 2017, Junior Library Guild selection in America 2018
- Night of the Fifth Moon – Notable Book, Children's Book Council of Australia 2008
- Two-year New Work Grant from the Literature Board of the Australia Council 2005
- Runestone – Notable Book, Children's Book Council of Australia 2003

== Books ==
=== Trade market books ===
- Have Kids, Will Travel, 1995, Silver Gum Press, ISBN 978-1-875843-08-4
- Going Places: The Kids’ Own Travel Book, 1995, Silver Gum Press, ISBN 978-1-875843-07-7
- Unplugged: the bare facts on toilets through the ages, 1997, Allen and Unwin, ISBN 978-1-86448-454-0
- Runestone the first book in the Viking Magic series, 2002, Allen and Unwin, ISBN 978-1-86508-689-7
- Wolfspell the second book in the Viking Magic series, 2003, Allen and Unwin, ISBN 978-1-74114-013-2
- Stormriders the third book in the Viking Magic series, 2004, Allen and Unwin, ISBN 978-1-74114-360-7
- Prisoner of Quentaris, 2006, Lothian Books an imprint of Hachette, ISBN 978-0-7344-0887-7
- Night of the Fifth Moon, 2007, Allen and Unwin, ISBN 978-1-74114-814-5
- 1000 Great Places to Travel with Kids in Australia, 2011, Explore Australia Publishing, a division of Hardie Grant, ISBN 978-1-74117-340-6
- The Family with Two Front Doors, 2016, Allen and Unwin, ISBN 978-1-925266-64-1, 2018, Kar-Ben ISBN 978-1-5415-0011-2, 2019 as Dwoje drzwi i dziewięcioro dzieci, Mamania ISBN 978-83-65796-97-4
- 52 Mondays, 2019, Allen and Unwin, ISBN 978-1-76052-348-0
- The Boy Who Stepped Through Time, 2021, Allen and Unwin, ISBN 978-1-76052-644-3
- A Message Through Time, 2023, Allen and Unwin, ISBN 978-1-76118-012-5
- Moonboy, 2025, Allen and Unwin, ISBN 978-1-76118-074-3

=== Educational market books (a selection) ===
- Christmas in Australia, CIS Publishers, 1993, ISBN 978-1-875633-38-8
- Through Children's Eyes series, 1995, Macmillan Education Australia, ISBN 978-0-7329-2113-2
- Australia in the Twentieth Century set of 11 volumes, 1998, Macmillan Education Australia, ISBN 978-0-7329-5382-9
- Mountain of Gold, 2001, Barrie Publishing, ISBN 978-1-74065-406-7
- Federation: Changing Australia, 2001, Macmillan Education Australia, ISBN 978-0-7329-6665-2
