= Gemini Falls =

2022 ovel by Australian author Sean Wilson

- Author: Sean Wilson
- Language: English
- Genre: Historical fiction, Mystery fiction, Rural noir fiction
- Publisher: Affirm Press
- Publication date: 27 September 2022
- Publication place: Australia
- ISBN: 192284893X
- OCLC: 1334593861

Gemini Falls is a debut novel written by Australian writer and playwright Sean Wilson.

Set against the backdrop of the Great Depression, it follows Jude Turner, a detective from Melbourne, who brings his 13-year-old son Morris and his daughter Lottie with him to the fictional mining town of Gemini when he is called to investigate the murder of a young woman. While there, Morris meets his cousin Flo, who wishes to become a detective, and Sam, the son of Gemini's mayor, and the trio aid in the investigation.

== Reception ==
Samuel Bernard of the Australian Book Review opined that while the novel "has some teething issues in prose and plot", these are "minor and largely excusable" for a debut novel, stating: "Beyond character, setting, and plot, Wilson uses a raft of key literary devices throughout to deliver a profound message." Christine Yunn-Yu Sun of the Upper Yarra Star Mail highly recommended the novel and called it "full of empathy and compassion". Michael McGuire of the The Advertiser wrote: "Although slow at times, this is worth pursuing to its rather surprising finale." Duncan Strachan of Kill Your Darlings opined that while it "shows some of the growing pains of a debut novelist" and the first act is "a little slow going", the "pay-off is deeply rewarding as no character escapes Wilson’s keen eye for story development, and each is treated with humanity and the keen perception of an exciting literary eye." The Sydney Morning Herald wrote that the novel "leans too heavily on the idea of teen detectives in a way that sidelines Jude’s perspective, pulling away from what might otherwise have made promising noir for adults."

== See also ==
- 2022 in Australian literature
