= Salonika Burning =

2022 novel by Australian author Gail Jones

- Author: Gail Jones
- Language: English
- Genre: Literary novel
- Publisher: Text Publishing
- Publication date: November 2022
- Publication place: Australia
- Media type: Print
- Pages: 256 pp.
- Awards: 2023 ARA Historical Novel Prize, winner
- ISBN: 9781922458834

Salonika Burning is a 2022 novel by the Australian author Gail Jones.

It was the winner of the 2023 ARA Historical Novel Prize.

== Synopsis ==
The novel follows four main characters from Britain and Australia in Salonika, Greece, (now Thessaloniki) during the First World War: Australian author Stella (Miles) Franklin, the artists Grace Pailthorpe and Stanley Spencer, and the adventurer Olive King. The four work as medical staff in a field hospital which is destroyed when the city burns.

== Critical reception ==
Writing in The Guardian Bec Kavanagh noted: "Jones writes about gender and trauma with her trademark gentle touch. In an unassuming but deft way, she reveals sides to her four main characters that disrupt stereotypes." She goes on to state: "At the end of the book there is one event that brings [the four main characters] together in a moment of terrible vulnerability, and this is the one time that Jones points a direct finger to the tragic, hypocritical injustices of combat, bringing the book to a close with a powerful sense of dramatic irony."

In Australian Book Review Diane Stubbings found "From the outset, Salonika Burning concerns itself with the 'pretty lies of art', how we assemble words and images into structures that offer an illusion of order and meaning, an illusion that is disturbed by the vibrations of memory." She concludes that "Gail Jones has written some fine novels...but none finer than Salonika Burning."

== Awards ==
- 2023 ARA Historical Novel Prize, winner
- 2023 Voss Literary Prize, shortlisted
- 2024 Barbara Jefferis Award, shortlisted

== See also ==
- 2022 in Australian literature
