= Women I Know =

2022 short story collection by Australian author Katerina Gibson

- Author: Katerina Gibson
- Language: English
- Genre: Short story collection
- Publisher: Simon and Schuster Australia
- Publication date: 6 July 2022
- Publication place: Australia
- Media type: Print
- Pages: 256 pp.
- Awards: 2023 New South Wales Premier's Literary Awards — Christina Stead Prize for Fiction, winner
- ISBN: 9781761106811

Women I Know is a 2022 short story collection by the Australian author Katerina Gibson originally published by Simon and Schuster.

It was the winner of the 2023 New South Wales Premier's Literary Awards, Christina Stead Prize for Fiction.

== Contents ==
- "Glitches in the algorithm"
- "Meat alternatives for the motherland: a review"
- "Orchestra of animals"
- "Constellation in the left eye"
- "A dog's world"
- "Intermission I: all the stories I started but never finished because of the time-restrictive and distracting nature of the gig economy"
- "A tight schedule"
- "All noise through the fog will be forgiven"
- "Women I know"
- "The shape of"
- "Preparation"
- "Intermission II: on the mythology in the room (field notes)"
- "Fertile soil"
- "Times you let anger slip on your throat"
- "Two hundred and one days of forests burning"
- "When the river floods our house"
- "As the nation still mourns"

== Critical reception ==
In Meanjin Matilda Dixon-Smith states that "Gibson is a deft writer, with a curious bluntness to her prose that occasionally reveals delicious images", and that "In her more confident moments, and more ambitious stories, Gibson's writing is chewy and engaging".

Writing in Australian Book Review Debra Adelaide noted that the stories in this collection have "an intellectual and imaginative power in their fearless probing into corners of the human world we didn't even think existed until now." She concluded that this "is an assured collection, audacious, dark, comic, and full of surprises."

== See also ==
- 2022 in Australian literature

== Notes ==
- Dedication: For my mother.

== Awards ==
- 2023 New South Wales Premier's Literary Awards – Christina Stead Prize for Fiction, winner
