= The Island of Last Things =

2025 novel by Emma Sloley

- Author: Emma Sloley
- Language: English
- Genre: Science Fiction Novel
- Publisher: Text Publishing
- Publication date: 12 August 2025
- Publication place: Australia
- Media type: Print
- Pages: 272 pp.
- ISBN: 9781923058606

The Island of Last Things is a 2025 science-fiction novel by Australian writer Emma Sloley.

== Themes ==
Writing in Locus Magazine, Niall Harrison argued that the key statement of the novel was "Promise me you’ll start imagining a better world than this one," saying that "Sloley seems to have set out to provoke her characters (and by extension her readers) into doing the work of imagining better, rather than doing so directly herself." Ilana Masad of The Los Angeles Times wrote that the novel "doesn’t sugarcoat how bad things have gotten in that future world, but Sloley refuses to let her characters succumb to despair; she is intent on highlighting the small moments of beauty, joy, and care that emerge even during disastrous, horrible times. “Do me a favor, huh?” Sailor asks Camille one night. “Promise me you’ll start imagining a better world than this one.” Imagining such a world, Sloley seems to be reminding her readers, is the only way to begin the work of creating it."

Jessica Epstein of the Library Journal wrote that the novel "explores interconnectedness and the ways people can care for each other," while giving "equal space and consideration to both human and animal characters."

== Reception ==
Ella Pilson of ArtsHub gave the novel 3.5/5 stars, describing it as "almost a literary take on Jurassic Park" that, "while it may not appeal to some, it’s so earnest in its hope for a better world that you can’t help get drawn in anyway."

Kirkus Reviews described the novel as "an all-too-plausible look at what the future might hold for the natural world and the people who strive to protect it."

== See also ==
- 2025 in Australian literature
