= Indie Book Awards Book of the Year – Book of the Year =

Prize category in Australian book awards

The Indie Book Awards Book of the Year – Book of the Year is a prize category in the annual Indie Book Awards (Australia) presented by Australian Independent Booksellers.

The prize is awarded to the book considered to be the best from among the other Indie Book Awards Book of the Year categories.

The award was established in 2008.

== Winners ==
Indie Book Awards Book of the Year – Book of the Year
Year	Author	Title	Category	Ref.
2008	Tim Winton	Breath	Fiction	
2009	Craig Silvey	Jasper Jones	Fiction	
2010	Not awarded			
2011	Anh Do	The Happiest Refugee	Non-Fiction	
2012	Anna Funder	All That I Am	Debut Fiction	
2013	M. L. Stedman	The Light Between Oceans	Debut Fiction	
2014	Richard Flanagan	The Narrow Road to the Deep North	Fiction	
2015	Don Watson	The Bush: Travels in the Heart of Australia	Non-Fiction	
2016	Charlotte Wood	The Natural Way of Things	Fiction	
2017	Jane Harper	The Dry	Debut Fiction	
2018	Jessica Townsend	Nevermoor: The Trials of Morrigan Crow	Children's	
2019	Trent Dalton	Boy Swallows Universe	Debut Fiction	
2020	Favel Parrett	There Was Still Love	Fiction	
2021	Pip Williams	The Dictionary of Lost Words	Debut Fiction	
2022	Trent Dalton	Love Stories	Non-Fiction	
2023	Craig Silvey	Runt	Children's	
2024	David Marr	Killing for Country: A Family Story	Non-Fiction	
2025	Robbie Arnott	Dusk	Fiction	
2026	Charlotte McConaghy	Wild Dark Shore	Fiction	
