= Indie Book Awards Book of the Year – Illustrated Non-Fiction =

Prize category in Australian book awards

The Indie Book Awards Book of the Year – Illustrated Non-Fiction is a prize category in the annual Indie Book Awards (Australia) presented by Australian Independent Booksellers.

The award was established in 2018.

== Winners and shortlists ==
=== 2018–2019 ===
Indie Book Awards Book of the Year – Illustrated Non-Fiction
Year	Author	Title	Result	Ref.
2018	Kate Herd & Jela Ivankovic-Waters	Native: Art & Design with Australian Plants	Winner	
2018	Maggie Beer with Professor Ralph Martins	Maggie's Recipe For Life	Finalist	
2018	Alex Elliott-Howery & Sabine Spindler	Cornersmith: Salads and Pickles	Finalist	
2018	Janelle McCulloch	Beyond the Rock	Finalist	
2019	Marcia Langton	Marcia Langton: Welcome to Country	Winner	
2019	Amber Creswell Bell	A Painted Landscape: Across Australia from Bush to Coast	Finalist	
2019	Hetty McKinnon	Family: New vegetable classics to comfort and nourish	Finalist	
2019	Claire Takacs	Australian Dreamscapes	Finalist	

=== 2020– ===
Indie Book Awards Book of the Year – Illustrated Non-Fiction
Year	Author	Title	Result	Ref.
2020	Paul Byrnes	The Lost Boys	Winner	
2020	Thomas Mayor	Finding the Heart of the Nation	Finalist	
2020	Josh Niland	The Whole Fish Cookbook	Finalist	
2020	Jo Turner (editor)	In an Australian Light	Finalist	
2021	Lauren Camilleri & Sophia Kaplan	Plantopedia	Winner	
2021	Samantha Bloom, Cameron Bloom & Bradley Trevor	Sam Bloom: Heartache & Birdsong	Finalist	
2021	Natalie Paull	Beatrix Bakes	Finalist	
2021	Alice Zaslavsky	In Praise of Veg	Finalist	
2022	Amber Creswell Bell	Still Life	Winner	
2022	Jane & Jimmy Barnes	Where the River Bends	Finalist	
2022	Jaclyn Crupi	Garden Like a Nonno	Finalist	
2022	Costa Georgiadis	Costa's World	Finalist	
2023	Damien Coulthard and Rebecca Sullivan	First Nations Food Companion	Winner	
2023	Eloise Grills	Big Beautiful Female Theory	Finalist	
2023	National Gallery of Australia	Cressida Campbell	Finalist	
2023	Nagi Maehashi	RecipeTin Eats: Dinner	Finalist	
2024	Wendy Cooper	The Bird Art of William T. Cooper	Winner	
2024	Paul Bangay	Paul Bangay	Finalist	
2024	Patricia Callan	The New Modernist House	Finalist	
2024	Hannah Moloney	Good Life Growing	Finalist	
2025	Criss Canning	The Paintings of Criss Canning	Winner	
2025	Nagi Maehashi	RecipeTin Eats : Tonight	Finalist	
2025	Patrick McCaughey	The Diaries of Fred Williams 1963-1970	Finalist	
2025	Tony Tan	Tony Tan's Asian Cooking Class	Finalist	
2026	Tim Pilgrim	Wild by Design	Winner	
2026	Matilda Boseley	The ADHD Brain Buddy	Finalist	
2026	Jaclyn Crupi	Planting for Native Birds, Bees and Butterflies	Finalist	
2026	Nat Thaipun	THAI	Finalist	
