= Indie Book Awards Book of the Year – Young Adult =

Prize category in Australian book awards

The Indie Book Awards Book of the Year – Young Adult is a prize category in the annual Indie Book Awards (Australia) presented by Australian Independent Booksellers.

The award was established in 2016. The works considered for this award were originally included under the scope of the Indie Book Awards Book of the Year – Children's & YA from 2008 to 2015. In 2016 that award was split into two separate awards (Indie Book Awards Book of the Year – Children's and Indie Book Awards Book of the Year – Young Adult).

== Winners and shortlists ==
=== 2016–2019 ===
Indie Book Awards Book of the Year – Young Adult
Year	Author	Title	Result	Ref.
2016	Fiona Wood	Cloudwish	Winner	
2016	Louis Nowra	Prince of Afghanistan	Finalist	
2016	John Flanagan	Ranger’s Apprentice: The Early Years 1: The Tournament at Gorlan	Finalist	
2016	Morris Gleitzman	Soon	Finalist	
2017	Cath Crowley	Words in Deep Blue	Winner	
2017	Amie Kaufman & Jay Kristoff	Gemina	Finalist	
2017	Mark Smith	The Road to Winter	Finalist	
2017	Krystal Sutherland	Our Chemical Hearts	Finalist	
2018	Mark Smith	Wilder Country	Winner	
2018	Claire Christian	Beautiful Mess	Finalist	
2018	Cath Crowley	Take Three Girls	Finalist	
2018	Kate O'Donnell	Untidy Towns	Finalist	
2019	Barry Jonsberg	A Song Only I Can Hear	Winner	
2019	A. J. Betts	Hive	Finalist	
2019	Erin Gough	Amelia Westlake	Finalist	
2019	Ambelin Kwaymullina & Ezekiel Kwaymullina	Catching Teller Crow	Finalist	

=== 2020– ===
Indie Book Awards Book of the Year – Young Adult
Year	Author	Title	Result	Ref.
2020	Wal Chim	The Surprising Power of a Good Dumpling	Winner	
2020	Amie Kaufman & Jay Kristoff	Aurora Rising: The Aurora Cycle 1	Finalist	
2020	Nina Kenwood	It Sounded Better in My Head	Finalist	
2020	Will Kostakis	Monuments	Finalist	
2021	Kate O'Donnell	This One is Ours	Winner	
2021	Asphyxia	Future Girl	Finalist	
2021	Barry Jonsberg	Catch Me If I Fall	Finalist	
2021	Garth Nix	The Left-Handed Booksellers of London	Finalist	
2022	Danielle Binks	The Monster of Her Age	Winner	
2022	Gary Lonesborough	The Boy from the Mish	Finalist	
2022	Lynette Noni	The Prison Healer	Finalist	
2022	Mark Smith	If Not Us	Finalist	
2023	Holden Shepherd	The Brink	Winner	
2023	Tristan Bancks	Cop and Robber	Finalist	
2023	Lauren Draper	The Museum of Broken Things	Finalist	
2023	Nina Kenwood	Unnecessary Drama	Finalist	
2024	Melissa Kang & Yumi Stynes	Welcome to Sex	Winner	
2024	Bradley Christmas	Saltwater Boy	Finalist	
2024	Garth Nix	The Sinister Booksellers of Bath	Finalist	
2024	Angourie Rice & Kate Rice	Stuck Up & Stupid	Finalist	
2025	Kate Emery	My Family and Other Suspects	Winner	
2025	Isobelle Carmody	Comes the Night	Finalist	
2025	Amy Doak	Eleanor Jones Can't Keep a Secret	Finalist	
2025	Tigest Girma	Immortal Dark	Finalist	
2026	Amy Doak	Eleanor Jones is Playing with Fire	Winner	
2026	Robbie Coburn	The Foal in the Wire	Finalist	
2026	Pip Harry	Drift	Finalist	
2026	Lynette Noni	Wandering Wildalist	Finalist	
