= Robert Lukins =

Australian writer

Robert Lukins is an Australian writer.

== Career ==
Lukins' debut novel The Everlasting Sunday was released by UQ Press in 2018 and received favourable reviews in major Australian publications and on Radio National's The Book Show. The book was shortlisted for the New South Wales Premier's Literary Awards for Fiction and the UTS Glenda Adams New Writing Award in the NSW Premier’s Literary Awards 2019 and was longlisted for The Voss Literary Prize and for The ALS Gold Medal for Literature. In January 2020 he was awarded an Australia Council fellowship.

== Bibliography ==
=== Novels ===
- The Everlasting Sunday (UQ Press 2018)
- Loveland (Allen & Unwin 2022)
- Somebody Down There Likes Me (Allen & Unwin 2025)

== Awards ==
- New South Wales Premier's Literary Awards, shortlist, 2019
- UTS Glenda Adams New Writing Award, shortlist, 2019
- The Voss Literary Prize, longlist, 2019
- ALS (Australian Literature Society), Gold Medal, longlist, 2019
- The Age/Sydney Morning Herald, 2018
- The Australian Book Review, 2018
