= Jess Racklyeft =

Australian children's book author and illustrator

Jess Racklyeft is an Australian illustrator and author of children's picture books, and creator of artistic works including paintings, prints and stationery. Racklyeft previously worked in publishing before becoming a full-time illustrator.

== Awards ==
- Won - SCBWI Crystal Kite for Australia New Zealand 2017.
- Notable - CBCA Children's Book of the Year Award: Picture Book Merry Everything (2016) written by Tania McCartney.
- Notable - CBCA Children's Book of the Year Award: Picture Book Smile Cry (2017) written by Tania McCartney.
- Longlisted - Indie Book Awards 2021 Welcome Baby (2020) written and illustrated by Jess Racklyeft.
- Won - CBCA Children's Book of the Year Award: Picture Book Iceberg (2022), written by Claire Saxby.
- Notable - CBCA Children's Book of the Year Award: Eve Pownall Award for Information Books Iceberg (2022) written by Claire Saxby.
- Notable - CBCA Children's Book of the Year Award: Picture Book Whisper on the Wind (2022) written by Claire Saxby.
- SCBWI International Bologna Scholarship 2023.
- Notable - CBCA Children's Book of the Year Award: Eve Pownall Award for Information Books Australia: Country of Colour (2023) written and illustrated by Jess Racklyeft.
