= Kar-Ben Publishing =

American publisher

- Parent company: Lerner Publishing Group
- Founded: 1975
- Founders: Judyth Groner and Madeline Wikler
- Country of origin: United States
- Headquarters location: Minneapolis, Minnesota
- Publication types: Books
- Fiction genres: Jewish children's literature
- Official website: www.karben.com

Kar-Ben Publishing, an award-winning children's book publisher providing a growing Jewish library for children, is a division of Minneapolis-based Lerner Publishing Group. Similar publishers that also specialize in the genre include: Apples & Honey Press, Kalaniot Books and Green Beans Books.

The company had its genesis in 1975, when two friends, Judyth Groner and Madeline Wikler, founded Kar-Ben Copies, Inc. to publish My Very Own Haggadah, a children's Passover haggadah they had created. By its 30th anniversary printing, it went on to sell over two million copies. The company is named after the two founders' youngest children, Madeline's daughter Karen and Judye's son Ben.

Over the next 27 years, under the leadership of the founders, Kar-Ben published more than 150 books for Jewish children and their families, the creative work of over 60 authors and illustrators. In recognition of their "outstanding contributions to the field of Jewish children's literature," Judye and Madeline were awarded the prestigious "Body of Work Award" by the Sydney Taylor Book Award committee.

In 2001, Kar-Ben was purchased by Lerner Publishing Group. Under the leadership of owner Adam Lerner and publisher Joni Sussman, Kar-Ben Publishing now publishes over sixteen new titles of Jewish content each year, for children from pre-school through middle school, both fiction and non-fiction. Kar-Ben has created many award-winning children's books on such subjects as Jewish holidays, crafts, folktales, and contemporary stories and picture books. Many have become popular classics including The Mouse in the Matzah Factory, Once Upon a Shabbos, the Sammy Spider series, The Secret of Priest's Grotto, and the best-selling book Six Million Paper Clips.
