= The Newcomer =

- Author: Laura Elizabeth Woollett
- Language: English
- Genre: Crime fiction
- Publisher: Scribe
- Publication date: 2021
- Publication place: Australia
- ISBN: 1925938921
- OCLC: 1237631737

The Newcomer is a crime fiction novel written by Australian author Laura Elizabeth Woollett. The novel follows a Paulina, a young woman looking to start anew on an Fairfolk Island, who ends up murdered, as well as Paulina's mother Judy as she attempts to solve her daughter's murder.

== Reception ==
Sue Turnbull called it a "stark, confronting and as compelling as a car going over a cliff in slow motion" and an "unsettling book about a vulnerable young woman who is her own worst enemy." Bec Kavanagh of The Guardian wrote that the novel "does a lot in its short pages, weaving together a story of grief and unhappiness with a compelling crime narrative." Zoya Patel, writing for The Canberra Times opined: "This is a pacey book that will leave the reader reflecting and unpacking it for days after reading, and that shows the versatility and potential still to be uncovered in Woollett's ability as a writer." Laura Kroetsch of the Herald Sun called it a "gritty thriller is really a story about the dangers of sex, small places and careless youth."
