= The Burning Island (novel) =

2020 novel by Australian author Jock Serong

- Author: Jock Serong
- Language: English
- Genre: Literary novel
- Publisher: Text Publishing
- Publication date: 1 September 2020
- Publication place: Australia
- Media type: Print
- Pages: 400 pp.
- Awards: 2021 ARA Historical Novel Prize, winner
- ISBN: 9781922330086

The Burning Island is a 2020 novel by the Australian author Jock Serong.

It was the winner of the 2021 ARA Historical Novel Prize.

== Synopsis ==
This novel is based on the true story of the loss of the sailing ship Britomart in 1839. The ship was sailing from Melbourne to Hobart with thirty passengers and cargo, which was lost with all hands. In the novel the ship is renamed Howrah whose owner, Bengali timber merchant Srinivas, believes the ship was lured to the Furneaux Islands by lawless sealers.

== Critical reception ==
Writing in Australian Book Review Nicole Abadee found a lot to like about the novel: "Serong, well known for his considerable skill at evoking a sense of place in his fiction, paints a vivid picture of the ship, the sea voyage, and life on board...While The Burning Island starts out as a crime thriller involving a search for a missing ship and a quest for revenge, it turns into something much more, a carefully researched, nuanced exploration of the history of relations between European men and Indigenous women in the Furneaux Islands, just north of Tasmania, in the 1830s."

== Awards ==
- 2021 ARA Historical Novel Prize, winner

== See also ==
- 2020 in Australian literature
