= Corporal Hitler's Pistol =

2021 novel by Australian author Thomas Keneally

- Author: Thomas Keneally
- Language: English
- Genre: Novel
- Publisher: Vintage
- Publication date: 31 August 2021
- Publication place: Australia
- Media type: Print
- Pages: 352 pp.
- ISBN: 9781760893224
- Preceded by: The Dickens Boy
- Followed by: Fanatic Heart

Corporal Hitler's Pistol is a 2021 historical novel by the Australian author Thomas Keneally.

== Synopsis ==
The novel is set in the northern New South Wales town of Kempsey in 1933, where an old German-Australian, Bert Webber, is rumoured to be in possession of Adolf Hitler's pistol from World War I. When Bert sees Hitler on a newsreel at the local cinema he has a fit and is taken to a psychiatric hospital in Sydney. Hitler's pistol is then used to kill an ex-IRA member on a local farm.

== Critical reception ==
Writing in The Guardian reviewer Susan Wyndham described the book as "a rollicking historical crime thriller", before noting that the author displays a "mastery of narrative technique in a series of cinematic set pieces that propel the story forward while intimately developing the characters."

== Awards ==
- 2022 ARA Historical Novel Prize - Adult, winner

== See also ==
- 2021 in Australian literature
