= Dale Kent =

Australian historian and scholar of the Italian Renaissance

Dale Kent FAHA
- Born: Dale Vivienne Butler; 1942 (age 83–84); Melbourne, Victoria, Australia

Academic background
- Education: University of Melbourne; University of London
- Thesis: Political alignments in Florence on the eve of Cosimo de Medici's rise to power, 1427–1434 (1971)

Dale Vivienne Kent FAHA (born 1942) is an Australian historian who specialises in the Italian Renaissance.

Born Dale Vivienne Butler in 1942, Kent was brought up in a Christian Science family in Melbourne, Victoria. She graduated from the University of Melbourne with a BA in history and English in 1965 and worked as a tutor at that university in 1966 and 1967. She then moved to England to undertake a PhD at the University of London (1967–1971). Returning to Melbourne, she worked at La Trobe University from 1971–1984) progressing from lecturer to senior lecturer and finally reader of history. In 1987 she moved to the United States as professor of history at the University of California, Riverside, a position she held until her retirement in 2009.

As of 2021, Kent is Professor Emeritus of the University of California at Riverside and Honorary Professor at the University of Melbourne.

Kent was elected a Fellow of the Australian Academy of the Humanities in 1984.

Her memoir, The Most I Could Be, was published by Melbourne University Press on 4 May 2021. Writing in the Australian Book Review, Jacqueline Kent (no relation) was disappointed that Kent shared little of her life as an academic.

== Selected works ==
- Kent, Dale (1978), The rise of the Medici: Faction in Florence, 1426–1434, Oxford University Press, ISBN 978-0-19-822520-1
- Kent, Dale (2000), Cosimo de' Medici and the Florentine Renaissance: The patron's oeuvre, Yale University Press, ISBN 978-0-300-08128-2
- Kent, Dale (31 January 2009), Friendship, love, and trust in Renaissance Florence, Harvard University Press (published 2009), ISBN 978-0-674-03137-1
- Kent, Dale (2021), The most I could be: A renaissance story, Melbourne University Publishing, ISBN 978-0-522-87767-0
