= In Moonland =

2021 novel by Australian author Miles Allinson

- Author: Miles Allinson
- Language: English
- Genre: Novel
- Publisher: Scribe
- Publication date: August 2021
- Publication place: Australia
- Media type: Print
- Pages: 256 pp.
- Awards: 2022 The Age Book of the Year Awards - winner
- ISBN: 9781925322927

In Moonland is a 2021 novel by the Australian author Miles Allinson originally published by Scribe.

== Synopsis ==
The novels tells the story of four characters, in four parts: Joe, contemplating the life of his daughter Sylvie and the possible death of his father; Vincent, in India in 1976, as he comes under the influence of a cult; Abbie, Vincent's friend; and adult Sylvie, Joe's daughter.

== Critical reception ==
Writing in The Guardian Imogen Dewey initially found the novel, despite the "intergenerational ties that bind the plot", too easy to call "a family novel", although she concludes: "The lesson of this book about freedom might be that self-sufficiency doesn’t exist – that freedom is other people. Maybe it is actually a family novel."

Dr Ann Skea, in The Newtown Review of Books, noted: "In Moonland tells four stories linked by family connections. Each has a different central character, and each of these has a distinctive voice and personality. Miles Allinson handles this all very skilfully and draws you into his characters' lives so well that you understand their doubts and certainties, share their experiences and feel their shifting emotions. Other characters people this book, too, and all of them turn out to be interesting individuals."

== Awards ==
- 2022 The Age Book of the Year Awards - winner

== Notes ==
- Author's note: For my mum, Margaret Halliday - And for Pardeshi and Rick.

== See also ==
- 2021 in Australian literature
