= Felicity Castagna =

Australian writer

- Born: Australia
- Education: Western Sydney University
- Occupations: Novelist; creative writing lecturer
- Writing career
- Genres: Young Adult fiction; essays; short stories
- Notable awards: Prime Minister's prize for Young Adult Fiction 2014; Victorian Premier's Prize for Writing for Young Adults 2022

Felicity Castagna is an Australian writer. She won the young adult fiction prize at the 2014 Prime Minister's Literary Awards for her book, The Incredible Here and Now and the 2022 Writing for Young Adults Victorian Premier's Literary Awards for her book, Girls in Boys' Cars.

== Early life and education ==
Castagna was born in Australia, but travelled with her family and lived in North America and Asia. She earned a BA at the University of Sydney, followed by a GradDipEd at the University of New England. In 2015 she graduated from Western Sydney University with a PhD for her thesis "Space, anxiety and the politics of belonging in suburban Australia".

== Career ==
Castagna's career began as an English teacher. Since completing her PhD in 2015, she has been a lecturer in creative writing at Western Sydney University. In addition she has been active as a writing teacher and mentor with Writing NSW and a number of community-based cultural and literary groups.

== Awards ==
Her first novel, The Incredible Here and Now, won the Young Adult Fiction Prize at the 2014 Prime Minister's Literary Awards. In 2014 it was shortlisted for the Ethel Turner Prize for Young People's Literature at the New South Wales Premier's Literary Awards, for the Children's Book of the Year Award: Older Readers, for the Writing for Young Adults prize at the Western Australian Premier's Book Awards and for the Young Adult Book Award at the Queensland Literary Awards. It was also shortlisted for the 2016 Adelaide Festival Awards for Literature Young Adult Fiction prize. In 2017 Castagna wrote a stage adaptation of the same name for the National Theatre of Parramatta.

In 2018 her second novel, No More Boats, was shortlisted for the Miles Franklin Award, the Voss Literary Prize and the NSW Multicultural Award at the NSW Premier's Literary Awards.

Her 2021 novel, Girls in Boys' Cars, won the 2022 Victorian Premier's Prize for Writing for Young Adults and the Griffith University Young Adult Book Award at the 2022 Queensland Literary Awards. It was also shortlisted for the 2022 Children's Book of the Year Award: Older Readers and for the 2022 Ethel Turner Prize for Young People’s Literature at the New South Wales Premier's Literary Awards.

== Works ==
=== Novels ===
- Castagna, Felicity (2013). The incredible here and now. Giramondo Publishing Company. ISBN 978-1-922146-36-6.
- —— (2017). No more boats. Giramondo Publishing. ISBN 978-1-925336-35-1.
- —— (2021). Girls in Boys' Cars. Pan Macmillan Australia. ISBN 978-1-76098-768-8.

=== Short story collection ===
- Castagna, Felicity (2011). Small indiscretions: Stories of travel in Asia. Transit Lounge Pub. ISBN 978-1-921924-23-1.

=== Play ===
- Castagna, Felicity (2017). The incredible here and now: The play. Currency Press. ISBN 978-1-76062-133-9.
