= After Story =

2021 novel by Larissa Behrendt

First edition (publ. UQP)

After Story, published in 2021, is the third novel by Indigenous Australian author Larissa Behrendt.

== Plot summary ==
Jasmine, an ambitious Indigenous lawyer, invites her mother, Della, at the last minute to a literary tour of Britain. Although Jasmine has moved to the city, Della has remained in her small New South Wales town her whole life. The relationship between mother and daughter is currently strained, and audience learns that this tension originates from the kidnapping and murder of Jasmine's oldest sister, Della's daughter, years before.

The structure of the novel covers each day of the on a tour of England's most revered literary sites shown from the perspective of Della, then Jasmine. The tour group are all literary enthusiasts, and are a mixture of participants from different ages, but mostly middle class. Jasmine's perceives that Della is out of place, and is worried about her history of issues with alcohol, both potentially embarrassing for Jasmine. Della is generally unimpressed but untroubled by the pretensions of the group, and easily makes connections with various members, who are drawn to her unaffected and curious temperament.

As Della and Jasmine learn about the personal lives of authors like Jane Austen, the Brontë sisters, Virginia Woolf and Thomas Hardy, they each reflect on how the impact of Brittany's murder unfolded - the blame that was cast and the estrangement of relationships that followed, as well as the blame. This is compounded when during their tour, the mother and daughter follow the news of another child going missing on Hampstead Heath.

Through learning about the lives of famous British storytellers, Della rediscovers the wisdom of her own culture and storytelling, with Jasmine growing a better understanding of the different ways stories can be passed on. Throughout the time they spend together, Jasmine and Della are able to work towards reconciling and understanding each other.

== Characters ==
- Della: A middle-aged Aboriginal woman who lives in a small town in New South Wales. More than twenty years previously her eldest daughter was kidnapped and murdered, a crime for which she briefly fell under suspicion and for which she has been vicariously blamed by some of her family and people in the town.
- Jasmine: Della's youngest daughter who is a lawyer in the city. She has no memory of her oldest sister.
- Aunty Elaine: Respected Elder of the town. A keeper of stories and culture, the stories of which Della begins to recollect throughout the novel.
- Leigh-Anne: Jasmine's older sister. Very different from her younger sister, she and Della have recently had an argument that both have found difficult to reconcile. She is suspicious of Jasmine's academic and career ambitions, and is much more frank, fiery and has a better understanding of her own identity than Jasmine, which is a source of tension.
- Brittany: Della's oldest daughter, who has been murdered more than twenty years before the narrative of the novel. She is only referred to in the novel.

== Reception ==
On the novel's release The Guardian (Australia) said that After Story asked "smouldering questions are leavened by characters who are funny, complex, and real."

The novel won the 2022 Voss Literary Prize and was shortlisted for the 2022 Victorian Premier's Literary Awards.
