= Voss Literary Prize =

Australian literary award

The Voss Literary Prize is an annual award named in honour of historian Vivian Robert de Vaux Voss (1930–1963). It is awarded to the best novel published in the previous year and is managed and judged by the Australian University Heads of English. The award was originally conceived by Voss in 1955, two years before publication of Patrick White's Voss, and is funded from his estate.

== Award winners ==
Year	Author	Title	Publisher	Result
2014	Fiona McFarlane	The Night Guest	Penguin Group (Australia)	Winner
2014	Hannah Kent	Burial Rites	Pan Macmillan	Shortlist
2014	Christos Tsiolkas	Barracuda	Allen & Unwin	Shortlist
2014	Tim Winton	Eyrie	Hamish Hamilton	Shortlist
2014	Alexis Wright	The Swan Book	Giramondo	Shortlist
2015	Elizabeth Harrower	In Certain Circles	Text Publishing	Winner
2015	Michael Mohammed Ahmad	The Tribe	Giramondo Publishing	Shortlist
2015	Sofie Laguna	The Eye of the Sheep	Allen & Unwin	Shortlist
2015	Gerald Murnane	A Million Windows	Giramondo Publishing	Shortlist
2015	Christos Tsiolkas	Merciless Gods	Allen & Unwin	Shortlist
2015	Rohan Wilson	To Name Those Lost	Allen & Unwin	Shortlist
2016	Leah Kaminsky	The Waiting Room	Random House	Winner
2016	Stephen Daisley	Coming Rain	Text Publishing	Shortlist
2016	Lisa Gorton	The Life of Houses	Giramondo	Shortlist
2016	Gail Jones	A Guide to Berlin	Vintage	Shortlist
2016	Mireille Juchau	The World Without Us	Bloomsbury	Shortlist
2016	Charlotte Wood	The Natural Way of Things	Allen & Unwin	Shortlist
2017	Mark O'Flynn	The Last Days of Ava Langdon	University of Queensland Press	Winner
2017	Jack Cox	Dodge Rose	Text Publishing	Shortlist
2017	Jennifer Down	Our Magic Hour	Text Publishing	Shortlist
2017	Toni Jordan	Our Tiny, Useless Hearts	Text Publishing	Shortlist
2017	Zoe Morrison	Music and Freedom	Vintage	Shortlist
2017	Josephine Rowe	A Loving, Faithful Animal	University of Queensland Press	Shortlist
2018	Bram Presser	The Book of Dirt	Text Publishing	Winner
2018	Felicity Castagna	No More Boats	Giramondo	Shortlist
2018	Eva Hornung	The Last Garden	Text Publishing	Shortlist
2018	Sofie Laguna	The Choke	Allen & Unwin	Shortlist
2018	Catherine McKinnon	Storyland	Fourth Estate	Shortlist
2018	Pip Smith	Half Wild	Allen & Unwin	Shortlist
2019	Tim Winton	The Shepherd's Hut	Hamish Hamilton	Winner
2019	Robyn Cadwallader	Book of Colours	Fourth Estate	Shortlist
2019	Peter Cochrane	The Making of Martin Sparrow	Viking	Shortlist
2019	Trent Dalton	Boy Swallows Universe	Hamish Hamilton	Shortlist
2019	Gail Jones	The Death of Noah Glass	Text Publishing	Shortlist
2019	Melissa Lucashenko	Too Much Lip	University of Queensland Press	Shortlist
2020	Tara June Winch	The Yield	Hamish Hamilton	Winner
2020	Alex Landragin	Crossings	Picador	Shortlist
2020	Andrew McGahan	The Rich Man's House	Allen & Unwin	Shortlist
2020	Mohammed Massoud Morsi	The Palace of Angels	Wild Dingo Press	Shortlist
2020	Meg Mundell	The Trespassers	University of Queensland Press	Shortlist
2020	Carrie Tiffany	Exploded View	Text Publishing	Shortlist
2021	Amanda Lohrey	The Labyrinth	Text Publishing	Winner
2021	Robbie Arnott	The Rain Heron	Text Publishing	Shortlist
2021	Gail Jones	Our Shadows	Text Publishing	Shortlist
2021	Vivian Pham	The Coconut Children	Penguin	Shortlist
2021	Nardi Simpson	Song of the Crocodile	Hachette	Shortlist
2022	Larissa Behrendt	After Story	University of Queensland Press	Winner
2022	Michael Mohammed Armad	The Other Half of You	Hachette	Shortlist
2022	Michelle De Kretser	Scary Monsters	Allen & Unwin	Shortlist
2022	Jennifer Down	Bodies of Light	Text Publishing	Shortlist
2022	Susan Johnson	From Where I Fell	Allen & Unwin	Shortlist
2022	Alice Pung	One Hundred Days	Black Inc.	Shortlist
2023	Robbie Arnott	Limberlost	Text Publishing	Winner
2023	Robert Drewe	Nimblefoot	Hamish Hamilton	Shortlist
2023	Gail Jones	Salonika Burning	Text Publishing	Shortlist
2023	Fiona Kelly McGregor	Iris	Picador	Shortlist
2023	Jock Serong	The Settlement	Text Publishing	Shortlist
2023	Craig Sherborne	The Grass Hotel	Text Publishing	Shortlist
2024	Alexis Wright	Praiseworthy	Giramondo	Winner
2024	André Dao	Anam	Hamish Hamilton	Shortlist
2024	Peter Polites	God Forgets About the Poor	Ultimo	Shortlist
2024	Sanya Rushdi	Hospital	Giramondo	Shortlist
2024	Ronnie Scott	Shirley	Hamish Hamilton	Shortlist
2025	Fiona McFarlane	Highway 13	Allen & Unwin	Winner
2025	Michelle de Kretser	Theory & Practice	Text Publishing	Shortlist
2025	Rodney Hall	Vortex	Picador	Shortlist
2025	Gail Jones	One Another	Text Publishing	Shortlist
2025	Siang Lu	Ghost Cities	University of Queensland Press	Shortlist
