= Miles Allinson =

Australian writer

Miles Allinson (born 1981) is an Australian writer.

== Biography ==
Allinson studied creative arts and writing at the University of Melbourne and RMIT University. As well as writing, he works as a bookseller.

Allinson's first book, Fever of Animals won the Victorian Premier's Unpublished Manuscript Award in 2014. His second book, In Moonland won The Age Fiction Book of the Year Award in 2022.

== Bibliography ==
- —— (2015). Fever of Animals. Scribe. ISBN 9781925106824.
- —— (2021). In Moonland. Scribe. ISBN 9781925322927.
