= Larissa Behrendt =

Indigenous Australian academic and writer

Larissa Behrendt AO FASSA FAHA FAAL
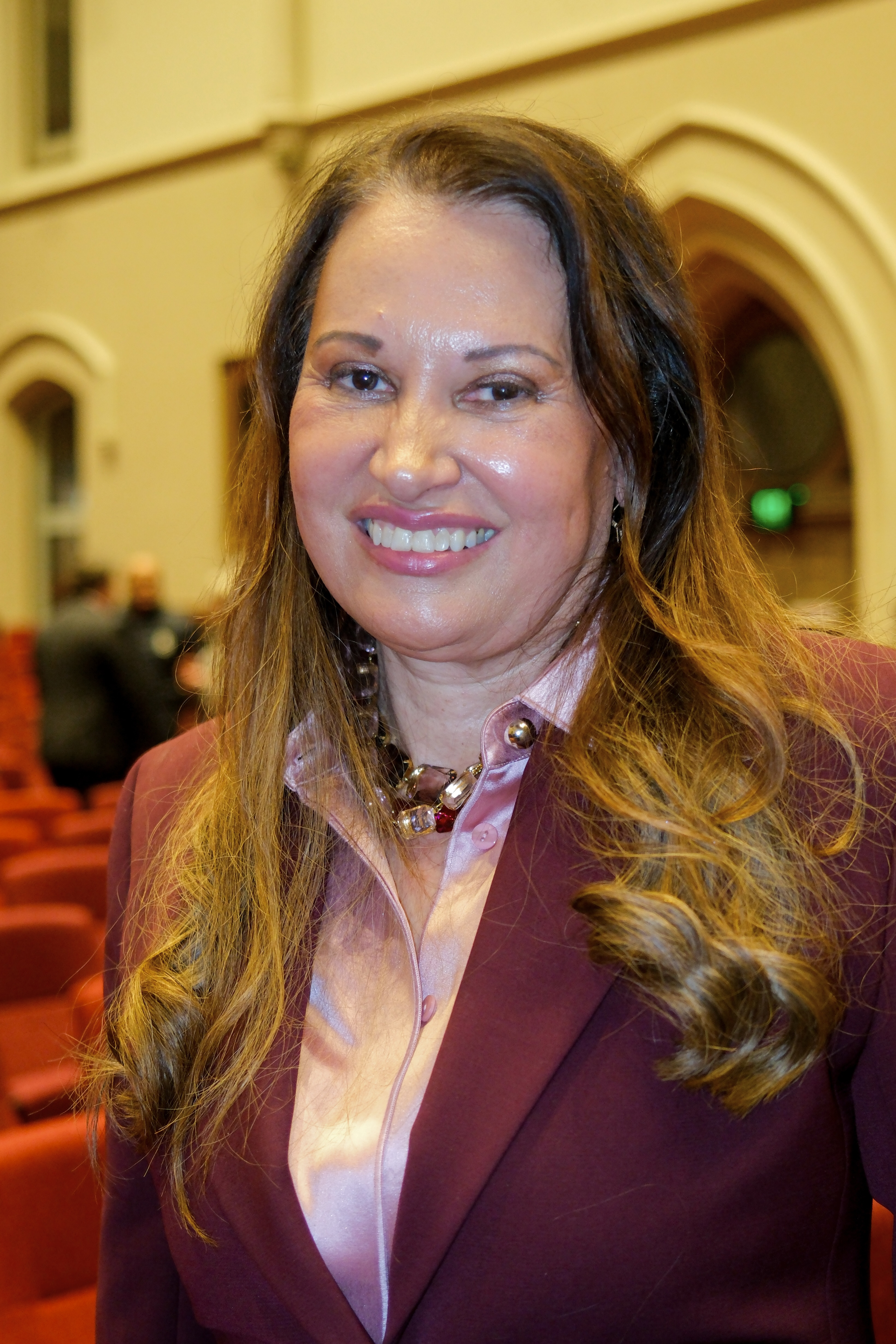
- Behrendt at the Elder Conservatorium of Music on 3 June 2026
- Born: Larissa Yasmin Behrendt; 1969 (age 56–57); Cooma, New South Wales, Australia
- Education: University of New South Wales; Harvard Law School
- Known for: Academic, writer, Indigenous rights advocate, filmmaker
- Larissa Behrendt's voice Behrendt speaking about reconciliation Recorded 3 June 2026

Larissa Yasmin Behrendt AO FASSA FAHA FAAL (born 1969) is an Australian legal academic, writer, filmmaker and Indigenous rights advocate. She was a professor of law (2001–2018) at the University of Technology Sydney (UTS), now distinguished professor there.

At UTS she was director of research and academic programs (2001–2011) at the Jumbunna Institute for Indigenous Education and Research and holds the inaugural position of Chair in Indigenous Research. In 2025 she was appointed the chair of the Writing Australia Council.

== Early life and education ==
Larissa Yasmin Behrendt was born in Cooma, New South Wales, in 1969, of Aboriginal descent on her father's side. He was a Eualeyai and Kamilaroi man, who grew up in an orphanage and became a street kid. As an adult, he worked as an air traffic controller before becoming an Aboriginal Studies academic. He established the Aboriginal Research and Resource Centre at the University of New South Wales, Sydney in 1988, around the time when Behrendt commenced studying there. Her mother, who was non-Indigenous, worked in naval intelligence. Behrendt describes her upbringing as "very much working-class", and both of her parents were against religion. They moved to Sutherland Shire when she was in primary school.

After attending Kirrawee High School, Behrendt completed a Bachelor of Jurisprudence and Bachelor of Laws degree at the University of New South Wales in 1992. In the same year, she was admitted by the Supreme Court of New South Wales to practise as a solicitor. After a stint of working in family law and legal aid, she travelled on a scholarship to the United States, where she completed a Master of Laws at Harvard Law School in 1994, and a Doctor of Juridical Science from the same institution in 1998. Behrendt was the first Indigenous Australian to graduate from Harvard Law School.

She also earned a Graduate Diploma in Screenwriting (2012) and Graduate Diploma in Documentary (2013) at the Australian Film, Television and Radio School (AFTRS), and is a graduate of the Australian Institute of Company Directors (2013).

== Career ==
=== Legal and academic ===
After graduating from Harvard Law School in the mid-1990s, Behrendt worked in Canada for a year with a range of First Nations organisations. In 1999, she worked with the Assembly of First Nations in developing a gender equality policy, and she represented the Assembly at the United Nations. The same year, she did a study for the Slavey people comparing native title developments in Australia, Canada and New Zealand.

Behrendt returned to Australia to become a postdoctoral researcher at the Australian National University, moving to University of Technology Sydney (UTS) in 2000. In 2000, she was admitted by the Supreme Court of the Australian Capital Territory to practise as a barrister. Behrendt is a republican, opposing the institution of monarchy in Australia.

She was a professor of law (2001–2018) and director of research and academic programs (2001–2011) at the Jumbunna Institute for Indigenous Education and Research at UTS. She was appointed inaugural chair of Indigenous Research and Director of Research and Academic Programs in 2011.

Behrendt has been involved in several pro bono test cases involving adverse treatment of Aboriginal peoples in the criminal justice system, including appearing as junior counsel in the NSW Supreme Court case of Campbell v Director of Public Prosecutions [2008]. She worked inside the NSW prison system between 2003 and 2012 in her role as Alternative Chair of the Serious Offenders Review Council. She has also held judicial positions on the Administrative Decisions Tribunal (Equal Opportunity Division) and as a Land Commissioner on the Land and Environment Court.

==== Current academic positions ====
As of July 2025 Behrendt is a distinguished professor (since 2018) at UTS, and is the Laureate Fellow at the Jumbunna Indigenous House of Learning. She is the inaugural chair of Indigenous Research and Director of Research and Academic Programs (since 2011).

=== Other work ===
==== In education and community ====
Behrendt has been active in issues around Indigenous education including literacy. In 2002, she was the co-recipient of the inaugural Neville Bonner National Teaching Award. She has served on the board of Tranby Aboriginal College in Glebe, Sydney and has been ambassador for the Gawura Campus (an Indigenous primary school) of St Andrew's Cathedral School since at least 2012. She was a founder of the Sydney Story Factory in 2012, which established a literacy program in Redfern.

In April 2011, Behrendt was appointed to chair the Review of Higher Education Access and Outcomes for Aboriginal and Torres Strait Islander People for the federal government. The Review, tasked with providing a roadmap for Indigenous university education, delivered its report in September 2012 and received a widely positive response for its emphasis on achievable parity targets and the re-allocation of existing resources to support meaningful outcomes such as "fostering a 'professional class' of Indigenous graduates". In releasing the report on 14 September 2012, Senator Chris Evans, Minister for Tertiary Education, accepted all of its recommendations.

From 2009 to 2012, she co-chaired the City of Sydney's Aboriginal and Torres Strait Islander Advisory Panel.

==== In the arts ====
Behrendt has played an active role in creating and supporting arts organisations and initiatives and is a consistent advocate of increased funding for the arts. She was the inaugural chair of National Indigenous Television (NITV), the first broadcast television network in Australia dedicated to Indigenous programming, from 2006 to 2009.

In 2008, she was appointed to the board of the Bangarra Dance Theatre and was chair from 2010 to 2014. She was appointed to the board of Museums and Galleries NSW in 2012.

Behrendt has served on the board of the Sydney Writers' Festival since 2015, the board of the Museum of Contemporary Art Australia, chairing their Indigenous Advisory Panel (2007–2012).

She was a board member of the Australian Major Performing Arts Group (AMPAG) from 2013 to 2014, was a judge of non-fiction on the New South Wales Premier's Literary Awards (2013–2014) and has been a member of the Australia Council Major Performing Arts Panel since 2015.

==== Writing ====
Behrendt has written extensively on legal and Indigenous social justice issues. Her books include Aboriginal Dispute Resolution (1995) and Achieving Social Justice (2003). In 2005 she co-authored the book Treaty.

Behrendt has also written three works of fiction, including a novel, Home, which won the Queensland Premier's Literary Awards, the David Unaipon Award in 2002 as well as the Commonwealth Writers Prize for Best First Novel in the south-east Asian/South Pacific region in 2005. Her second novel, Legacy, won the Victorian Premier's Literary Award Prize for Indigenous Writing (2010). Her third novel, After Story, was published in 2021.

In 2012, Behrendt published Indigenous Australia For Dummies.

On 1 July 2025 she was appointed the chair of the Writing Australia Council. Writing Australia is part of Creative Australia, and is responsible for supporting and promoting the Australian literature.

==== Film ====
Behrendt has written, directed, and/or produced a number of documentary films since 2013, including Innocence Betrayed (2013, writer) In My Blood It Runs (2019, producer) and Maralinga Tjarutja (2020, writer), the latter about the British nuclear tests at Maralinga in South Australia. She was Indigenous consultant for the TV documentary miniseries Australia: The Story of Us in 2015, Who do you think you are? (2018–2019) and other projects.

In 2016 Behrendt (as director) and Michaela Perske (writer and producer) were awarded the Indigenous Feature Documentary Initiative funding by the Adelaide Film Festival in conjunction with Screen Australia and KOJO to work on their feature documentary project, After the Apology, and on 9 October 2017, AFF held the world première of the resulting film. The film looks at the increase in Indigenous child removal in the years following Kevin Rudd's Apology to Australia's Indigenous peoples. It won Best Direction of a Documentary Feature Film from the Australian Directors Guild in 2018, and was nominated in three categories in the 2018 AACTA Awards, including Best Direction in Nonfiction Television.

Behrendt directed Maralinga Tjarutja, a May 2020 television documentary made by Blackfella Films for ABC Television, which tells the story of the people of Maralinga, South Australia, since the 1950s British nuclear tests at Maralinga. It was deliberately broadcast around the same time that the drama series Operation Buffalo was on, to give voice to the Indigenous people of the area and show how it disrupted their lives. Screenhub gave it 4.5 stars, calling it an "excellent documentary". The film shows the resilience of the Maralinga Tjarutja people, and how they have continued to fight for their rights to look after the contaminated land. The film won the 2020 AACTA Award for Best Direction in Nonfiction Television.

In 2020 Behrendt worked as a writer for Season 2 of Total Control (TV series), and as writer/director on a documentary film entitled The Fight Together.

Behrendt directed Araatika: Rise Up!, a documentary about a group of National Rugby League players creating an Aboriginal Australian equivalent of the New Zealand Māoris' haka. Luke Buckmaster gave it 3 out of 5 stars in his review in The Guardian, describing Behrendt's directorial style as "that of a cine-essayist, talented at fishing through and arranging evidence, particularly when it comes to political and cultural context". Araatika: Rise Up! streamed at the Sydney Film Festival in 2021, and aired on NITV in 2022.

Behrendt directed a feature documentary One Mind, One Heart, produced by Michaela Perske, which premiered at the Adelaide Film Festival in October 2024. The film follows the story of the 1963 Yirrkala bark petitions created by Yolgnu people at the Yirrkala mission, two of which were presented to the Australian Parliament in 1963. These petitions, the first documentary recognition of Indigenous people in Australian law, were landmarks in the campaign to preserve culture and maintain Aboriginal land rights. The film was also screened on NITV, SBS Television, and SBS On Demand (where it is still available as of December 2025) on 19 January 2025, and at the Antenna Documentary Film Festival in February 2025,

==== Radio ====
Behrendt presents radio programme Speaking Out, covering "politics, arts and culture from a range of Indigenous perspectives". It broadcasts on ABC Radio National on Fridays at 12pm (noon) and on ABC Local Radio on Sundays at 9pm.

== Recognition ==
Behrendt is a fellow of the Academy of the Social Sciences in Australia and a Foundation Fellow of the Australian Academy of Law.

- 1993: Winner, Lionel Murphy Foundation Scholarship
- 2002: Co-winner, inaugural Neville Bonner National Teaching Award
- 2002: David Unaipon Award in the Queensland Premier's Literary Awards, for her fiction work Home
- 2004: Winner, 2004 Deadly Award for outstanding achievement in literature
- 2005: Winner, Commonwealth Writers' Prize – Best first novel (Asia/Pacific)
- 2009: National NAIDOC Person of the Year
- 2009: Winner, Prize for Indigenous Writing, Victorian Premier's Literary Awards, for Legacy.
- 2011: NSW Australian of the Year
- 2012: AFTRS AW Myer Indigenous Award
- 2018: Best Direction of a Documentary Feature Film, Australian Directors Guild, for After the Apology
- 2020: 2020 Australia Day Honours, Officer in the General Division of the Order of Australia (AO), for her "distinguished service to Indigenous education and research, the law and the visual and performing arts"
- 2021: Winner, Human Rights Medal
- 2023: Fellow of the Australian Academy of the Humanities

== Personal life ==
Behrendt married US artist Kris Faller in 1997 while at Harvard. They separated amicably in 2001 and were later divorced.

She had a long-term relationship with Geoff Scott, a senior Indigenous bureaucrat, former CEO of the Aboriginal and Torres Strait Islander Commission, and current CEO of NSW Aboriginal Land Council.

In 2009, Behrendt began a relationship with Michael Lavarch, former Attorney-General of Australia; they married in 2011.

== Bibliography ==
=== Novels ===
- Home. St Lucia, Qld: University of Queensland Press. 2004.
- Legacy, University of Queensland Press, St Lucia, QLD, 2009, ISBN 9780702237331
- After Story, University of Queensland Press, St Lucia, QLD, 2021, ISBN 9780702263316

=== Short stories ===
- "The Space Between Us", in Behrendt et al., 10 short stories you must read in 2011, the Australia Council for the Arts, Australia, 2011, ISBN 9780733628481, Chapter 3: pp. 47–67
- "Under Skin, In Blood", Overland, Winter no. 203, 2011

=== Children's fiction ===
- Crossroads, Oxford University Press, South Melbourne, VIC, 2011, ISBN 9780195572483

=== Non-fiction ===
- Aboriginal Dispute Resolution: A step towards self-determination and community autonomy, Federation Press, Leichhardt, NSW 1995, ISBN 1862871787
- Achieving social justice: indigenous rights and Australia's future, Federation Press, Annandale, NSW, 2003, ISBN 1862874506
- Resolving Indigenous Disputes: Land conflict and beyond, co-authored with Loretta Kelly, Federation Press, Leichhardt, NSW, 2008, ISBN 9781862877078
- "Breaking the silences in the Constitution". Memento. 39: 11–12. 2010.
- Indigenous Australia for Dummies, John Wiley & Sons, Milton, QLD, 2012, ISBN 9781742169637
- Rabbit-proof Fence, Currency Press, Sydney, NSW, 2012, ISBN 9780868199108
- Finding Eliza: Power and colonial storytelling, University of Queensland Press, St Lucia, QLD, 2016, ISBN 9780702253904
- Finding Justice: From Courtroom to Country, University of Queensland Press, St Lucia, QLD, 2026, ISBN 9780702268328

== 2011 tweet storm and Eatock v Bolt ==
Comments made by Behrendt on Twitter that appeared to disparage Northern Territory Member of the Legislative Assembly, Territory Minister, and Aboriginal elder Bess Price caused controversy despite Behrendt's continued insistence that the tweet was taken out of context. She maintains that she was referring not to Price, but to the acrimonious tenor of a debate on the television program Q+A. Behrendt had replied to a Twitter comment that had expressed outrage about Price's support for the Northern Territory intervention, writing "I watched a show where a guy had sex with a horse and I'm sure it was less offensive than Bess Price", referring to TV series Deadwood. Behrendt apologised both publicly and privately to Price, who did not formally accept her apology. Behrendt said that the throwaway comment has made her a target for a campaign of character assassination, with several commentators agreeing, most notably Robert Manne. The Australian published 15 stories on Behrendt within two weeks of the tweet.

The disparagement of Behrendt was subsequently characterised as a coordinated response to a court case in which she and eight others were simultaneously involved against News Corp, known as Eatock v Bolt. Herald Sun columnist Andrew Bolt had used Behrendt's name in two articles about "political" Aboriginal people. Bolt asserted that Behrendt and other fair-skinned Aboriginal people claimed Aboriginality to advance their careers. The Federal Court ruled that the articles were inflammatory, offensive and contravened the Racial Discrimination Act.
