= Affirm Press =

Australian book publisher

Affirm Press is a Melbourne-based book publisher.

== History ==
In 2010, Affirm Press began publishing several books a year as a part-time operation between Martin Hughes, former editor of The Big Issue, and Graeme Wise, founder of The Body Shop Australia. In 2014 Affirm Press appointed Keiran Rogers as its Sales and Marketing Director, and became a full-time publishing house.

Affirm Press publishes a broad range of non-fiction books and a select fiction list. In 2017 they added a kids list.

Each year Affirm Press partners with a charity to publish a profit-for-purpose book. These projects have raised hundreds of thousands of dollars and include bestsellers Letters of Love with the Alannah & Madeline Foundation, The Silver Sea by Alison Lester and Jane Godwin and From Little Things Big Things Grow by Paul Kelly and Kev Carmody.

In September 2024, it was announced that Simon & Schuster Australia had entered an agreement to acquire Affirm Press.

== Awards ==
In 2019 Affirm Press was named Small Publisher of the Year at the Australian Book Industry Awards, and in 2024 was shortlisted for Publisher of the Year. Its books have won various major awards.

In 2021, The Dictionary of Lost Words by Pip Williams won the ABIA's General Fiction Book of the Year, the Indie Book Awards Book of the Year, the Indie Books Awards Debut Fiction, the ABA Booksellers' Choice Adult Fiction Book of the Year, the MUD Literary Prize for Best Debut Novel, and the NSW Premier's Literary Awards People's Choice Award. In 2021, the book was also shortlisted for NSW Premier's Literary Awards Christina Stead Prize for Fiction and the Walter Scott Historical Prize in the UK.

In 2021, The Grandest Bookshop in the World by Amelia Mellor won the ABIA's Book of the Year for Younger Children and the NSW Premier's Literary Award Patricia Wrightson Prize for Children's Literature. It was shortlisted for the ARA Historical Novel Prize (Children and Young Adult Category), the Readings' Children's Fiction Prize, and Speech Pathology Australia's Book of the Year (8-10 years).

In 2023, The Bookseller's Apprentice by Amelia Mellor won the ARA Historical Novel Prize: Children and Young Adult. It was shortlisted for the ABIA's Book of the Year for Younger Children (ages 7-12), Book People Awards Children's Book of the Year, and Reading's Children's Prize. It was longlisted for the Indie Book Awards Children's category.

In 2024, The Bookbinder of Jericho by Pip Williams won the ABIA's General Fiction Book of the Year and Marketing Strategy of the Year, and was shortlisted for the Indie Book Awards and Dymocks Book of the Year. In 2023, it won Booktopia's Best Overall Book Award and was longlisted for the ARA Historical Novel Prize.

Additional notable awards include the Stella Prize (The Strays by Emily Bitto), the Booksellers Choice Award (The Birdman’s Wife by Melissa Ashley), and The Children’s Book Council of Australia’s Picture Book of the Year Award (A Walk in the Bush by Gwyn Perkins). In August 2018 Christian White became the fastest-selling Australian debut novelist on record when Affirm Press published his book The Nowhere Child.

== Corporate affairs ==
Affirm Press is owned equally by Martin Hughes, CEO and Publishing Director, Keiran Rogers, Sales and Finance Director, and Graeme Wise.

In 2023, Affirm Press launched its national sales team, consisting of six members. The sales team are supported by Hachette New Zealand and Affirm Press books are distributed by Alliance Distribution Services.

The publisher also represents a number of international publishing houses in Australia and New Zealand including The Experiment, School of Life, Gemini Books, David Fickling Books, New Dawn, Little Book Press, and two Lighthouse accounts.

Affirm Press sells rights to overseas publishers and audio and film producers, and has a partnership with the prestigious Kaplan/DeFiore Rights Agency (New York City) and Rights People (London).
