= Katrina Nannestad =

Australian children's writer

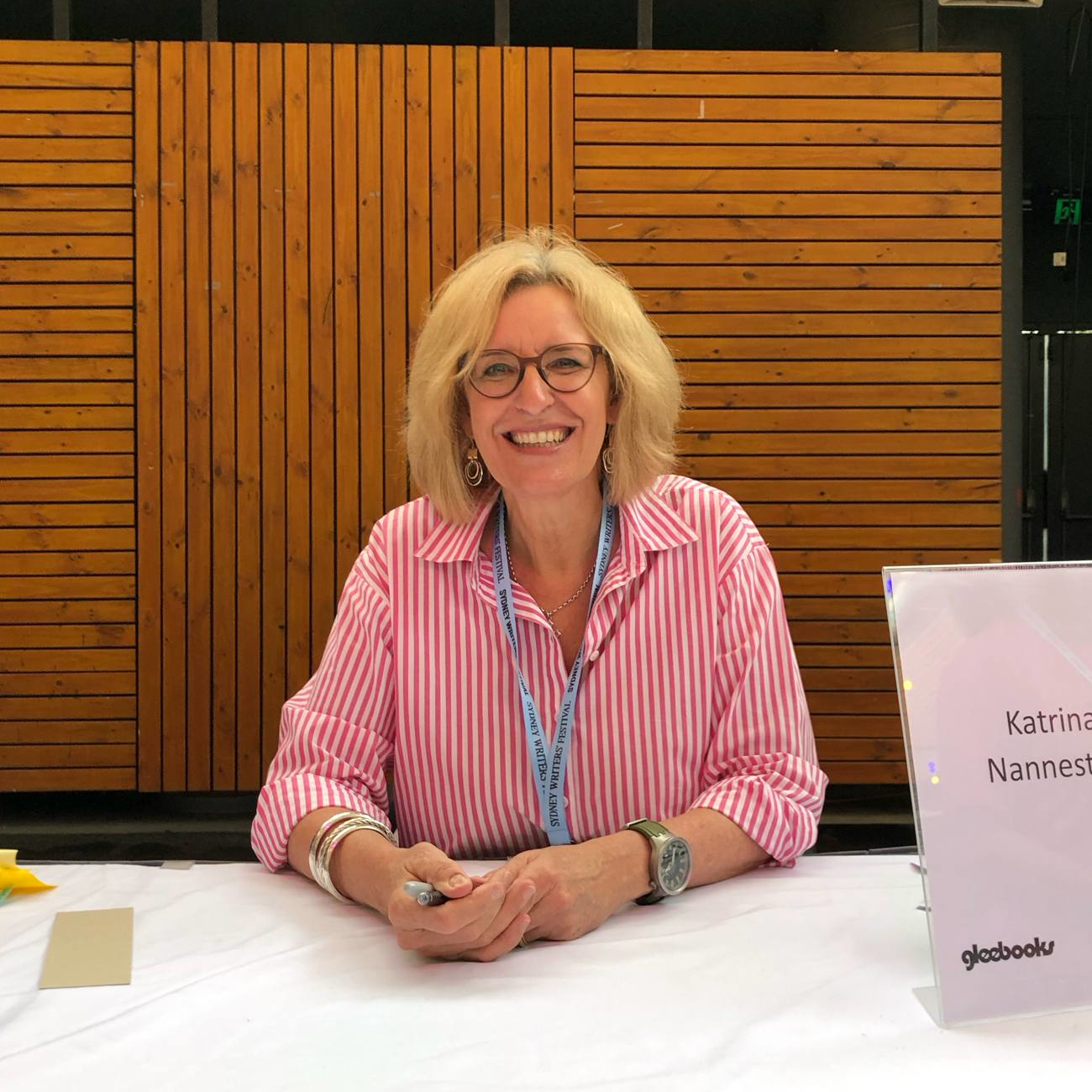
- Nannestad at the Sydney Writers Festival, 2025
- Born: Coonabarabran, Australia
- Education: University of New England
- Occupation: Author
- Writing career
- Language: English
- Years active: 2001 - present
- Genres: historical fiction, children's literature
- Notable awards: Patricia Wrightson Prize for Children's Books, 2014, 2025
- Website: www.katrinanannestad.com

Katrina Nannestad is an Australian children's literature writer. Many of her books are historical children's fiction.

== Career ==
Following her graduation from the University of New England, Armidale with qualifications in English and education, Nannestad began her career as a school teacher.

=== 2000-2020 ===
Nannestad published her first novel, Bungaloo Creek, in 2001.

The Red Dirt Diaries, a series of three books, was published 2010-2012 and won a NSW Premiers Literacy Award.

The Girl Who Brought Mischief was published in 2013 and is about a girl living in Denmark in 1911. It won the Patricia Wrightson Prize for Children's Books at the New South Wales Premier's Literary Awards 2014.

In the later 2010s Nannestad began multiple book series. The Olive of Groves with three books, the first of which was published in 2015 and are illustrated by Lucia Masciullo. The Girl, the Dog and the Writer series was also made up of three books - The Girl, the Dog and the Writer in Rome (2017), The Girl, the Dog and the Writer in Provence (2018), and The Girl, the Dog and the Writer in Lucerne (2019).

The Lottie Perkins series contains four books published in 2019 and 2020 that were all illustrated by Makoto Koji.

=== 2020 and onwards ===
In 2021 Nannestad published the first book in her The Travelling Bookshop series, Mim and the Baffling Bully.

Waiting for the Storks was published in 2022 and is based on the real-life Lebensborn program - a program in Nazi Germany where "aryan" children were taken from other countries in order to increase the German population. The main character, Zofia Ulinski, is taken from her family in Poland. Waiting for the Storks won a Children's Book Award at the Queensland Literary Awards 2023.

We Are Wolves was published in 2022 and is based loosely on the true story of the Wolfskinder. The story is about three German children fleeing their town in East Prussia after it was sieged by the Red Army during World War II. During the events of the novel, the children struggle to survive and face conflict when learning what they were taught about the Germany Army and the Red Army was not completely true. The novel won the 2021 Historical Novel Society Australasia in the Children and Young Adult category, and the Children's Literature Award 2022 at the Adelaide Festival Awards for Literature.

Silver Linings was published in 2023 and is set in Australia post-WWII. It won a Patricia Wrightson Prize for Children's Books at the New South Wales Premier's Literary Awards 2025.

Rabbit, Soldier, Angel, Thief was released in 2022. It is about six-year-old soldier Sasha, who was taken in by the Red Army after being orphaned. It was inspired by the true story of Sergey Aleshkov. The novel won an Indie Award in 2022, a Booksellers Choice Award 2022 for Children's Book of the Year, Shadowers' Choice Award and Book of the Year (Younger Readers) at the CBCA Book of the Year Awards 2022, and won in the Children and Young Adult category at the Historical Novel Society Australasia 2022.

All the Beautiful Things was published in 2024. It is set in Nazi Germany.

== Personal life ==
Nannestad grew up in Central New South Wales.

As of 2022, Nannestad was living in Bendigo, Victoria.
