= Indie Book Awards (Australia) =

Annual literary awards presented by Australian Independent Booksellers

The Indie Book Awards are a group of awards presented annually by Australian Independent Booksellers. They were established in 2008 in order to recognise and reward the best in Australian writing, chosen by independent booksellers in Australia.

The last change to the awards categories occurred in 2018, after which there are six categories, with an overall winner chosen as Indie Book of the Year:

- Indie Book of the Year Fiction
- Indie Book of the Year Non-Fiction
- Indie Book of the Year Debut Fiction
- Indie Book of the Year Children's & YA (2008–2015)
- Indie Book of the Year Children's (from 2016)
- Indie Book of the Year Young Adult (from 2016)
- Indie Book of the Year Illustrated Non-Fiction (from 2018)

From 2008 until 2015 the Children's and Young Adult books were included in the same category. In 2016 they were split into separate awards.

A longlist of titles is compiled and announced in December of each year and a shortlist (24 titles, four per category) are announced in late January.

The winners of the Indie Book Awards are widely reported on by various media, including libraries and publishing-related websites.
