= Prime Minister's Literary Awards =

Australian literary award

- Awarded for: Literary talent of emerging and established writers, illustrators, poets and historians.
- Country: Australia
- First award: 2008
- Website: creative.gov.au/investments-opportunities/prime-ministers-literary-awards-2025

The Australian Prime Minister's Literary Awards (PMLA) are an annual prize for outstanding literary works. The award was announced at the end of 2007 by the incoming First Rudd ministry following the 2007 election. They are administered by the Minister for the Arts.

The awards were designed as "a new initiative celebrating the contribution of Australian literature to the nation's cultural and intellectual life." The awards are held annually and initially provided a tax-free prize of A$100,000 in each category, making it Australia's richest literary award in total. In 2011, the prize money was split into $80,000 for each category winner and $5,000 for up to four short-listed entries. The award was initially given in four categories – fiction, non-fiction, young adult and children's fiction – as selected by three judging panels. In 2012, a poetry category was added and the former Prime Minister's Prize for Australian History was incorporated into the award. To be eligible, writers "must be a citizen or permanent resident of Australia."

== History ==
For the inaugural 2008 awards, six Australians were appointed by the Minister for the Environment, Heritage and the Arts to the judging panels: three each for the fiction and non-fiction awards. The final decisions on the shortlist and winners for the awards was made by Prime Minister (Kevin Rudd) based on the judging panels' recommendations.

Two new award categories were announced on 30 March 2010: "young adults' fiction" and "children's fiction." The prize for both new awards was also $100,000; its entries were judged by one judging panel.

Entries for the 2011 awards opened in January 2011 and an annual timetable was implemented: the shortlist was announced in late May and winners in early July. The awards were restructured to provide greater recognition for shortlisted authors. In each category, the winning book was awarded $80,000; $5,000 was awarded to up to four shortlisted titles. The eligibility criteria were extended to include e-books, and wordless picture books were eligible in the children's fiction category. The panellists from 2010 were returned for 2011.

In 2012, a new award for poetry was announced and the Prize for Australian History was incorporated.

== Winners ==
Year	Fiction	Non-fiction	Young adult fiction	Children's fiction	Poetry	Australian history
2008	The Zookeeper's War by Steven Conte	Ochre and Rust: Artefacts and Encounters on Australian Frontiers by Philip Jones	Not awarded (2008-2009)		Not awarded (2008-2011)	
2009	The Boat by Nam Le	House of Exile: The Life and Times of Heinrich Mann, and Nelly-Kroeger Mann by Evelyn Juers, and Drawing the Global Colour Line by Marilyn Lake and Henry Reynolds	Not awarded (2008-2009)		Not awarded (2008-2011)	
2010	Dog Boy by Eva Hornung	The Colony: A History of Early Sydney by Grace Karskens	Confessions of a Liar, Thief and Failed Sex God by Bill Condon	Star Jumps by Lorraine Marwood	Not awarded (2008-2011)	
2011	Traitor by Stephen Daisley	The Hard Light of Day by Rod Moss	Graffiti Moon by Cath Crowley	Shake a Leg by Boori Monty Pryor and Jan Ormerod	Not awarded (2008-2011)	
2012	Foal's Bread by Gillian Mears	An Eye for Eternity: The Life of Manning Clark by Mark McKenna	When We Were Two by Robert Newton	Goodnight, Mice!, written by Frances Watts and illustrated by Judy Watson	Interferon Psalms by Luke Davies	The Biggest Estate on Earth by Bill Gammage
2013	Questions of Travel by Michelle de Kretser	The Australian Moment by George Megalogenis	Fog a Dox by Bruce Pascoe	Red by Libby Gleeson	Jam Tree Gully: Poems by John Kinsella	Farewell, Dear People by Ross McMullin
2014	A World of Other People by Steven Carroll, and The Narrow Road to the Deep North by Richard Flanagan	Moving Among Strangers by Gabrielle Carey, and Madeleine: A Life of Madeleine St John by Helen Trinca	The Incredible Here and Now by Felicity Castagna	Silver Buttons by Bob Graham	Drag Down to Unlock or Place an Emergency Call by Melinda Smith	Broken Nation: Australians in the Great War by Joan Beaumont, and Australia's Secret War: How Unionists Sabotaged Our Troops in World War II by Hal G.P. Colebatch
2015	The Golden Age by Joan London	John Olsen: An Artist's Life by Darleen Bungey, and Wild Bleak Bohemia: Marcus Clarke, Adam Lindsay Gordon and Henry Kendall by Michael Wilding	The Protected by Claire Zorn	One Minute's Silence by David Metzenthen and illustrated by Michael Camilleri	Poems 1957–2013 by Geoffrey Lehmann	Charles Bean by Ross Coulthart, and The Spy Catchers – The Official History of ASIO Vol 1 by David Horner
2016	The Life of Houses by Lisa Gorton and The Natural Way of Things by Charlotte Wood	On Stalin's Team: The Years of Living Dangerously in Soviet Politics by Sheila Fitzpatrick, and Thea Astley: Inventing her own Weather by Karen Lamb	A Single Stone by Meg McKinlay	Sister Heart by Sally Morgan	The Hazards by Sarah Holland-Batt	The Story of Australia's People. The Rise and Fall of Ancient Australia by Geoffrey Blainey, and Let My People Go: The untold story of Australia and the Soviet Jews 1959–89 by Sam Lipski and Suzanne D Rutland
2017	Their Brilliant Careers by Ryan O'Neill	Quicksilver by Nicolas Rothwell	Words in Deep Blue by Cath Crowley	Home in the Rain by Bob Graham, and Dragonfly Song by Wendy Orr	Headwaters by Anthony Lawrence	Atomic Thunder: The Maralinga Story by Elizabeth Tynan
2018	Border Districts by Gerald Murnane	Asia's Reckoning by Richard McGregor	This Is My Song by Richard Yaxley	Pea Pod Lullaby by Glenda Millard and Stephen Michael King	Blindness and Rage: A Phantasmagoria by Brian Castro	John Curtin's War: The coming of war in the Pacific, and reinventing Australia, volume 1 by John Edwards
2019	The Death of Noah Glass by Gail Jones	The Bible in Australia: A Cultural History by Meredith Lake	The Things That Will Not Stand by Michael Gerard Bauer	His Name Was Walter by Emily Rodda	Sun Music: New and Selected Poems by Judith Beveridge	Half the Perfect World: Writers, Dreamers and Drifters on Hydra, 1955–1964 by Paul Genoni and Tanya Dalziell
2020	The Yield by Tara June Winch	Songspirals: Sharing Women's Wisdom of Country through Songlines by Gay'Wu Group of Womenand; Sea People: The Puzzle of Polynesia by Christina Thompson	How It Feels to Float by Helena Fox	Cooee Mittigar: A Song on Darug Songlines by Jasmine Seymour and Leanne Mulgo Watson (illustrator)	The Lost Arabs by Omar Sakr	Meeting the Waylo: Aboriginal Encounters in the Archipelago by Tiffany Shellam
2021	The Labyrinth by Amanda Lohrey	The Stranger Artist: Life at the edge of Kimberley painting by Quentin Sprague	Metal Fish, Falling Snow by Cath Moore	Fly on the Wall by Remy Lai and How to Make a Bird by Meg McKinlay and Matt Ottley (illustrator)	The Strangest Place: New and selected poems by Stephen Edgar	People of the River: Lost worlds of early Australia by Grace Karskens
2022	Red Heaven by Nicolas Rothwell	Rogue Forces: An Explosive Insiders’ Account of Australian SAS War Crimes in Afghanistan by Mark Willacy	The Gaps by Leanne Hall	Mina and the Whole Wide World by Sherryl Clark and Briony Stewart (illustrator)	Human Looking by Andy Jackson	Semut: The Untold Story of a Secret Australian Operation in WWII Borneo by Christine Helliwell
2023	Cold Enough for Snow by Jessica Au	My Father and Other Animals by Sam Vincent	The Greatest Thing by Sarah Winifred Searle	Open Your Heart to Country by Jasmine Seymour	At the Altar of Touch by Gavin Yuan Gao	Unmaking Angas Downs by Shannyn Palmer
2024	Anam by André Dao	Close to the Subject: Selected Works by Daniel Browning	We Could Be Something by Will Kostakis	Tamarra: A Story of Termites on Gurindji Country by Violet Wadrill, Topsy Dodd Ngarnjal, Leah Leaman, Cecelia Edwards, Cassandra Algy, Felicity Meakins, Briony Barr & Gregory Crocetti	The Cyprian by Amy Crutchfield	Donald Horne: A Life in the Lucky Country by Ryan Cropp
2025	Theory & Practice by Michelle de Kretser	Mean Streak by Rick Morton	The Invocations by Krystal Sutherland	Leo and Ralph by Peter Carnavas	The Other Side of Daylight: New and Selected Poems by David Brooks	Critical Care: Nurses on the Frontline of Australia's AIDS Crisis by Geraldine Fela
2026	A Piece of Red Cloth by Leonie Norrington, Merrkiyawuy Ganambarr-Stubbs, Djawa Burarrwanga & Djawundil Maymuru	The Red House by Kate Wild	Drift by Pip Harry	Song of a Thousand Seas by Zana Fraillon	Two Hundred Million Musketeers by Ender Başkan	The Southern Frontier by Rohan Howitt

== Winners and shortlists ==
=== Australian history ===
PMLA for Australian History winners and shortlists
Year	Author	Title	Result	Ref.
2012 (Note: The 2012 non-fiction and history judging panel was chaired by Christopher (Chris) Masters PSM and included Dr Faye Sutherland, Colin Steele, and Dr Michelle Arrow.)	Bill Gammage	The Biggest Estate on Earth	Winner	
2012	James Boyce	1835: The Founding of Melbourne and the Conquest of Australia	Finalist	
2012	Charles Massy	Breaking the Sheep's Back	Finalist	
2012	Russell McGregor	Indifferent Inclusion: Aboriginal people and the Australian Nation	Finalist	
2012	Renegade Films Australia	Immigration Nation: The Secret History of Us	Finalist	
2013 (Note: The 2013 non-fiction and history judging panel was chaired by Michael Sexton SC and included Colin Steele, Susan Hayes, and Professor Susan Magarey.)	Ross McMullin	Farewell, dear people	Winner	
2013	Frank Bongiorno	The Sex Lives of Australians: A History	Finalist	
2013	Paul Ham	Sandakan	Finalist	
2013	Jenny Hocking	Gough Whitlam	Finalist	
2013	Nicole Moore	The Censor's Library	Finalist	
2014 (Note: The 2014 non-fiction and history judging panel was chaired by Gerard Henderson and included Peter Coleman, Ross Fitzgerald, Ida Lichter, and Ann Moya.)	Joan Beaumont	Broken Nation: Australians in the Great War	Winner	
2014	Hal G. P. Colebatch	Australia's Secret War: How Unionists Sabotaged Our Troops in World War II	Winner	
2014	Mike Carlton	First Victory 1914	Finalist	
2014	Michael Pembroke	Arthur Phillip: Sailor, Mercenary, Governor, Spy	Finalist	
2014	Clare Wright	The Forgotten Rebels of Eureka	Finalist	
2015 (Note: The 2015 non-fiction and history judging panel was chaired by Ida Litcher and included Peter Coleman, Ross Fitzgerald, and Gerard Henderson.)	Ross Coulthart	Charles Bean	Winner	
2015	David Horner	The Spy Catchers: The Official History of ASIO Vol 1	Winner	
2015	Alan Atkinson	The Europeans in Australia – Volume Three: Nation	Finalist	
2015	Peter Brune	Descent into Hell	Finalist	
2015	Anne Henderson	Menzies at War	Finalist	
2016	Geoffrey Blainey	The Story of Australia's People. The Rise and Fall of Ancient Australia	Winner	
2016	Sam Lipski and Suzanne D Rutland	Let My People Go: The untold story of Australia and the Soviet Jews 1959–89	Winner	
2016	Peter Monteath and Valerie Munt	Red Professor: The Cold War Life of Fred Rose	Finalist	
2016	Doug Morrissey	Ned Kelly: A Lawless Life	Finalist	
2016	Robert Stevenson	The War with Germany: Volume III – The Centenary History of Australia and the Great War	Finalist	
2017 (Note: The 2017 non-fiction and history judging panel was chaired by Lynette Russell and included Helen Trinca, Richard Waterhouse, Greg Melleuish, and Sally Warhaft.)	Elizabeth Tynan	Atomic Thunder: The Maralinga Story	Winner	
2017	Josephine Bastian	A Passion for Exploring New Countries' Matthew Flinders and George Bass	Finalist	
2017	Neil McDonald	Valian for Truth: The Life of Chester Wilmot, War Correspondent	Finalist	
2017	John Murphy	Evatt: A Life	Finalist	
2017	Charlie Ward	A Handful of Sand: The Gurindji Struggle, After the Walk-off	Finalist	
2018 (Note: The 2018 non-fiction and history judging panel was chaired by Lynette Russell and included Helen Trinca, Richard Waterhouse, Greg Melleuish, and Sally Warhaft.)	John Edwards	John Curtin's War: The coming of war in the Pacific, and reinventing Australia, Volume 1	Winner	
2018	Jayne Persian	Beautiful Balts: From Displaced Persons to New Australians	Finalist	
2018	Paul Irish	Hidden in Plain View: The Aboriginal People of Coastal Sydney	Finalist	
2018	Timothy Rowse	Indigenous and Other Australians Since 1901	Finalist	
2018	Judith Brett	The Enigmatic Mr Deakin	Finalist	
2019	Meredith Lake	The Bible in Australia: A Cultural History	Winner	
2019	Anna Haebich	Dancing in Shadows: Histories of Nyungar Performance	Finalist	
2019	Billy Griffiths	Deep Time Dreaming: Uncovering Ancient Australia	Finalist	
2019	David Kemp	The Land of Dreams: How Australians Won Their Freedom, 1788–1860	Finalist	
2019	Clare Wright	You Daughters of Freedom: The Australians Who Won the Vote and Inspired the World	Finalist	
2020 (Note: The 2020 non-fiction and history judging panel was chaired by Richard Waterhouse and included Sally Warhaft, John Fitzgerald, and John Maynard.)	Tiffany Shellam	Meeting the Waylo: Aboriginal Encounters in the Archipelago	Winner	
2020	Judith Brett	From Secret Ballot to Democracy Sausage: How Australia Got Compulsory Voting	Finalist	
2020	Susan Lawrence and Peter Davies	Sludge: Disaster on Victoria's Goldfields	Finalist	
2020	Marilyn Lake	Progressive New World: How Settler Colonialism and Transpacific Exchange Shaped American Reform	Finalist	
2020	Scott Patterson	The Oarsmen: The Remarkable Story of the Men Who Rowed from the Great War to Peace	Finalist	
2021 (Note: The 2021 non-fiction and Australian history judging panel was chaired by Andrew Tink and included Chris Mitchell, Troy Bramston, Deborah Hope, and Gail Pearson.)	Grace Karskens	People of the River: Lost worlds of early Australia	Winner	
2021	Michael Bennett	Pathfinders: A history of Aboriginal trackers in NSW	Finalist	
2021	Mark Dunn	The Convict Valley: The Bloody Struggle on Australia's Early Frontier	Finalist	
2021	Jason M. Gibson	Ceremony Men: Making Ethnography and the Return of the Strehlow Collection	Finalist	
2021	Amanda Harris	Representing Australian Aboriginal Music and Dance 1930-1970	Finalist	
2022	Christine Helliwell	Semut: The Untold Story of a Secret Australian Operation in WWII Borneo	Winner	
2022	Sheila Fitzpatrick	White Russians, Red Peril: A Cold War History of Migration to Australia	Finalist	
2022	Mark McKenna	Return to Uluru	Finalist	
2022	Deirdre O'Connell	Harlem Nights: The Secret History of Australia's Jazz Age	Finalist	
2022	Peter Sutton and Keryn Walshe	Farmers or Hunter-Gatherers? The Dark Emu Debate	Finalist	
2023	Shannyn Palmer	Unmaking Angas Downs: Myth and history on a Central Australian pastoral station	Winner	
2023	Alan Atkinson	Elizabeth and John: The Macarthurs of Elizabeth Farm	Finalist	
2023	Lachlan Strahan	Justice in Kelly Country: The story of the cop who hunted Australia’s most notorious bushrangers	Finalist	
2023	Rohan Lloyd	Saving the Reef: The human story behind one of Australia’s greatest environmental treasures	Finalist	
2023	Russell Marks	Black Lives, White Law: Locked up and locked out in Australia	Finalist	
2024	Ryan Cropp	Donald Horne: A Life in the Lucky Country	Winner	
2024	Rose Ellis	Bee Miles	Finalist	
2024	Kate Fullagar	Bennelong and Phillip: A History Unravelled	Finalist	
2024	David Marr	Killing for Country: A Family Story	Finalist	
2024	Alecia Simmonds	Courting: An Intimate History of Love and the Law	Finalist	
2025	Geraldine Fela	Critical Care: Nurses on the Frontline of Australia's AIDS Crisis	Winner	
2025	Peter Kirkpatrick	The Wild Reciter: Poetry and Popular Culture in Australia 1890 to the Present	Finalist	
2025	Amanda Laugesen	Australia in 100 Words	Finalist	
2025	Darren Rix & Craig Cormick	Warra Warra Wai	Finalist	
2025	Clare Wright	Näku Dhäruk The Bark Petitions	Finalist	
2026	Rohan Howitt	The Southern Frontier	Winner	
2026	Judith Brett	Fearless Beatrice Faust: Sex, Feminism and Body Politics	Finalist	
2026	Shayne Breen	First Tasmanians: A Deep History	Finalist	
2026	Emily Gallagher	Playtime: A History of Australian Childhood	Finalist	
2026	Rachel Perkins, Stephen Gapps, Mina Murray & Henry Reynolds	The Australian Wars	Finalist	

=== Children's fiction ===
PMLA for Children's Fiction winners and shortlists
Year	Author	Title	Result	Ref.
2010 (Note: The 2010 judging panel for children's and young adult fiction was chaired by Dr Robyn Sheahan-Bright and included Mike Shuttleworth and Mary-Ruth Mendel.)	Lorraine Marwood	Star Jumps	Winner	
2010	Kate Constable	Cicada Summer	Finalist	
2010	Ursula Dubosarsky, illus. by Andrew Joyner	The Terrible Plop	Finalist	
2010	Andy Griffiths, illus. by Terry Denton	Just Macbeth!	Finalist	
2010	Leigh Hobbs	Mr Chicken Goes to Paris	Finalist	
2010	Alison Lester	Running with the Horses	Finalist	
2010	Martine Murray, illus. by Sally Rippin	Mannie and the Long Brave Day	Finalist	
2010	Jen Storer	Tensy Farlow and the Home for Mislaid Children	Finalist	
2010	Margaret Wild, illus. by Freya Blackwood	Harry and Hopper	Finalist	
2011	Boori Monty Pryor and Jan Ormerod	Shake a Leg	Winner	
2011	Bronwyn Bancroft	Why I Love Australia	Finalist	
2011	Lucy Christopher	Flyaway	Finalist	
2011	Morris Gleitzman	Now	Finalist	
2011	Bob Graham	April Underhill, Tooth Fairy	Finalist	
2012 (Note: The 2012 children's and young adult fiction judging panel was chaired by Judith White and included Mary-Ruth Mendel and Robert (Bob) Sessions.)	Frances Watts, illus. by Judy Watson	Goodnight, Mice!	Winner	
2012	Maggie Alderson	Evangeline, The Wish Keeper's Helper	Finalist	
2012	Graeme Base	The Jewel Fish of Karnak	Finalist	
2012	Anne Brooksbank	Father's Day	Finalist	
2012	Sonya Hartnett, illus. by Lucia Masciullo	Come Down, Cat!	Finalist	
2013 (Note: The 2013 children's and young adult fiction judging panel was chaired by Judith White and included Adele Rice and Robert (Bob) Sessions.)	Libby Gleeson	Red	Winner	
2013	Peter Friend, illus. by Andrew Joyner	What's the Matter, Aunty May?	Finalist	
2013	Jane Godwin, illus. by Anna Walker	Today We Have No Plans	Finalist	
2013	Marianne Musgrove	The Beginner's Guide to Revenge	Finalist	
2014 (Note: The 2014 children's and young adult fiction judging panel was chaired by Mike Shuttleworth and included Belle Alderman, Kate Colley, Mark MacLeod, and Irini Savvides.)	Bob Graham	Silver Buttons	Winner	
2014	Julie Hunt	Song for a Scarlet Runner	Finalist	
2014	Barry Jonsberg	My Life as an Alphabet	Finalist	
2014	Alison Lester	Kissed by the Moon	Finalist	
2014	Shaun Tan	Rules of Summer	Finalist	
2015 (Note: The 2015 children's and young adult fiction judging panel was chaired by Mike Shuttleworth and included Belle Alderman, Kate Colley, Mark MacLeod, and Irini Savvides.)	David Metzenthen, illus. by Michael Camilleri	One Minute's Silence	Winner	
2015	Tristan Bancks	Two Wolves	Finalist	
2015	Nicola Connelly, illus. by Annie White	My Dad is a Bear	Finalist	
2015	Irena Kobald, illus. by Freya Blackwood	My Two Blankets	Finalist	
2015	Judith Rossell	Withering-by-Sea	Finalist	
2016	Sally Morgan	Sister Heart	Winner	
2016	Elise Hurst	Adelaide's Secret World	Finalist	
2016	Danny Parker and Freya Blackwood	Perfect	Finalist	
2016	Tohby Riddle	The Greatest Gatsby: A visual book of grammar	Finalist	
2016	Anna Walker	Mr Huff	Finalist	
2017 (Note: The 2017 children's and young adult fiction judging panel was chaired by Margot Hillel and included Joy Lawn, Margrete Lamond, Robyn Ewing, and Sue Whiting.)	Bob Graham	Home in the Rain	Winner	
2017	Wendy Orr	Dragonfly Song	Winner	
2017	Janet A. Holmes, illus. by Jonathan Bentley	Blue Sky, Yellow Kite	Finalist	
2017	Dee Huxley, illus. by Oliver Huxley	My Brother	Finalist	
2017	Tamsin Janu	Figgy and the President	Finalist	
2018 (Note: The 2018 children's and young adult fiction judging panel was chaired by Margot Hillel and included Joy Lawn, Kerry Neary, Robyn Ewing, and Sue Whiting.)	Glenda Millard and Stephen Michael King	Pea Pod Lullaby	Winner	
2018	Phil Cummings and Phil Lesnie	Feathers	Finalist	
2018	Tamsin Janu	Figgy Takes the City	Finalist	
2018	Lisa Shanahan and Binny Talib	Hark, It's Me, Ruby Lee!	Finalist	
2018	Sarah Brennan and Jane Tanner	Storm Whale	Finalist	
2019	Emily Rodda	His Name Was Walter	Winner	
2019	Eddie Ayres, illus. by Ronak Taher	Sonam and the Silence	Finalist	
2019	Margaret Wild, illus. by Freya Blackwood	The Feather	Finalist	
2019	Kirli Saunders, illus. by Matt Ottley	The Incredible Freedom Machines	Finalist	
2019	David Mackintosh	Waiting for Chicken Smith	Finalist	
2020 (Note: The 2020 children's and young adult fiction judging panel was chaired by Margot Hillel and included Margrete Lamond, Kirli Saunders, James Roy, and Demet Divaroren.)	Jasmine Seymour, illus. by Leanne Mulgo Watson	Cooee Mittigar: A Song on Darug Songlines	Winner	
2020	Dion Beasley, illus. by Johanna Bell	Cheeky Dogs: To Lake Nash and Back	Finalist	
2020	Christine Booth	One Careless Night	Finalist	
2020	Martin Ed Chatterton	Winter of the White Bear	Finalist	
2020	Meg McKinlay	Catch a Falling Star	Finalist	
2021 (Note: The 2020 children's and young adult fiction judging panel was chaired by James Roy and included Demet Divaroren, Erica Wagner, Paula Kelly Paull, and Richard Yaxley.)	Remy Lai	Fly on the Wall	Winner	
2021	Meg McKinlay, illus. by Matt Ottley	How to Make a Bird	Winner	
2021	Jaclyn Moriarty, illus. by Kelly Canby	The Stolen Prince of Cloudburst	Finalist	
2021	Kate Constable	The January Stars	Finalist	
2021	Danielle Binks	The Year the Maps Changed	Finalist	
2022	Sherryl Clark, illus. by Briony Stewart	Mina and the Whole Wide World	Winner	
2022	Freya Blackwood	The Boy and the Elephant	Finalist	
2022	Gregg Dreise	Common Wealth	Finalist	
2022	Karen Foxlee	Dragon Skin	Finalist	
2022	Maryam Master, illus. by Astred Hicks	Exit Through the Gift Shop	Finalist	
2023	Jasmine Seymour	Open Your Heart to Country	Winner	
2023	Aunty Shaa Smith and Yandaarra	The Dunggiirr Brothers and the Caring Song of the Whale	Finalist	
2023	Gabrielle Wang	Zadie Ma and the Dog Who Chased the Moon	Finalist	
2023	Randa Abdel-Fattah, illus. by Maxine Beneba Clarke	11 Words for Love	Finalist	
2023	Zeno Sworder	My Strange Shrinking Parents	Finalist	
2024	Violet Wadrill, Topsy Dodd Ngarnjal, Leah Leaman, Cecelia Edwards, Cassandra Algy, Felicity Meakins, Briony Barr & Gregory Crocetti	Tamarra: A Story of Termites on Gurindji Country	Winner	
2024	Jared Field, illus. by Jeremy Worrall	Etta and the Shadow Taboo	Finalist	
2024	Remy Lai	Ghost Book	Finalist	
2024	Rebecca Lim	Two Sparrowhawks in a Lonely Sky	Finalist	
2024	Alice Pung, illus. by Sher Rill Ng	Millie Mak the Maker	Finalist	
2025	Peter Carnavas	Leo and Ralph	Winner	
2025	Kelly Canby	A Leaf Called Greaf	Finalist	
2025	Kylie Gatjawarrawuy Mununggurr	Raymaŋgirrbuy dhäwu, When I was a little girl	Finalist	
2025	David Petzold	We Life in a Bus	Finalist	
2025	Briony Stewart	Everything You Ever Wanted to Know About the Tooth Fairy (And Some Things You Didn't)	Finalist	
2026	Zana Fraillon	Song of a Thousand Seas	Winner	
2026	Felicita Sala	Bored	Finalist	
2026	Sandy Bigna	Little Bones	Finalist	
2026	Valerie Brumby	Rain on the Rock	Finalist	
2026	Karen Foxlee	The Wondrous Tale of Lavender Wolfe	Finalist	

=== Fiction ===
PMLA for Fiction winners and shortlists
Year	Author	Title	Result	Ref.
2008 (Note: The 2008 panel judges for fiction were John Marsden (an author) and Margaret Throsby (a broadcaster). The committee was chaired by Peter Pierce, an academic.)	Steven Conte	The Zookeeper's War	Winner	
2008	Gail Jones	Sorry	Finalist	
2008	Mireille Juchau	Burning In	Finalist	
2008	Tom Keneally	The Widow and Her Hero	Finalist	
2008	Malcolm Knox	Jamaica	Finalist	
2008	David Malouf	The Complete Stories	Finalist	
2008	Dorothy Porter	El Dorado	Finalist	
2009 (Note: The 2009 judging panel was chaired by Professor Peter Pierce and included Professor John A. Hay AC and Dr Lyn Gallacher.)	Nam Le	The Boat	Winner	
2009	Murray Bail	The Pages	Finalist	
2009	Geraldine Brooks	People of the Book	Finalist	
2009	Richard Flanagan	Wanting	Finalist	
2009	Peter Goldsworthy	Everything I Knew	Finalist	
2009	Sofie Laguna	One Foot Wrong	Finalist	
2009	Joan London	The Good Parents	Finalist	
2010 (Note: The 2009 fiction panel returned in 2010, chaired by Professor Peter Pierce and included Professor John A. Hay AC and Dr Lyn Gallacher.)	Eva Hornung	Dog Boy	Winner	
2010	J. M. Coetzee	Summertime	Finalist	
2010	Deborah Forster	The Book of Emmett	Finalist	
2010	Alan Gould	The Lakewoman	Finalist	
2010	David Malouf	Ransom	Finalist	
2010	Alex Miller	Lovesong	Finalist	
2010	Alison Wong	As the Earth Turns Silver	Finalist	
2011	Stephen Daisley	Traitor	Winner	
2011	Roberta Lowing	Notorious	Finalist	
2011	Roger McDonald	When Colts Ran	Finalist	
2011	David Musgrave	Glissando	Finalist	
2011	Kim Scott	That Deadman Dance	Finalist	
2012 (Note: The 2012 judging panel for fiction and poetry was chaired by Joel Becker and included Dr Lyn Gallacher, Professor Chris Wallace-Crabbe AM, and Peter Craven.)	Gillian Mears	Foal's Bread	Winner	
2012	Anna Funder	All That I Am	Finalist	
2012	Kate Grenville	Sarah Thornhill	Finalist	
2012	Janette Turner Hospital	Forecast: Turbulence	Finalist	
2012	Alex Miller	Autumn Laing	Finalist	
2013 (Note: The 2013 fiction and poetry judging panel was chaired by Joel Becker and included Professor Chris Wallace-Crabbe AM, Professor Philip Mead, and Jane Sullivan.)	Michelle de Kretser	Questions of Travel	Winner	
2013	Romy Ash	Floundering	Finalist	
2013	Peter Carey	The Chemistry of Tears	Finalist	
2013	Christopher Koch	Lost Voices	Finalist	
2013	Carrie Tiffany	Mateship with Birds	Finalist	
2014 (Note: The 2014 fiction and poetry judging panel was chaired by Louise Adler and included Jamie Grant, Margie Bryant, Les Murray, and Robert Gray.)	Steven Carroll	A World of Other People	Winner	
2014	Richard Flanagan	The Narrow Road to the Deep North	Winner	
2014	Fiona McFarlane	The Night Guest	Finalist	
2014	Alex Miller	Coal Creek	Finalist	
2014	Nicolas Rothwell	Belomor	Finalist	
2015 (Note: The 2015 fiction and poetry judging panel was chaired by Louise Adler and included Des Cowley, Jamie Grant, and Robert Gray.)	Joan London	The Golden Age	Winner	
2015	Peter Carey	Amnesia	Finalist	
2015	Elizabeth Harrower	In Certain Circles	Finalist	
2015	Sonya Hartnett	Golden Boys	Finalist	
2015	Rohan Wilson	To Name Those Lost	Finalist	
2016	Lisa Gorton	The Life of Houses	Winner	
2016	Charlotte Wood	The Natural Way of Things	Winner	
2016	Steven Carroll	Forever Young	Finalist	
2016	David Ireland	The World Repair Video Game	Finalist	
2016	Steve Toltz	Quicksand	Finalist	
2017 (Note: The 2017 fiction and poetry judging panel was chaired by Bronwyn Lea and included Kathy Shand, James Ley, Susan Wyndham, and Sarah Holland-Batt.)	Ryan O'Neill	Their Brilliant Careers	Winner	
2017	Steven Amsterdam	The Easy Way Out	Finalist	
2017	Mark O'Flynn	The Last Days of Ava Langdon	Finalist	
2017	Philip Salom	Waiting	Finalist	
2017	Josephine Wilson	Extinctions	Finalist	
2018 (Note: The 2018 fiction and poetry judging panel was chaired by Bronwyn Lea and included Kathy Shand, James Ley, Susan Wyndham, and Sarah Holland-Batt.)	Gerald Murnane	Border Districts	Winner	
2018	Peter Carey	A Long Way from Home	Finalist	
2018	Richard Flanagan	First Person	Finalist	
2018	Kim Scott	Taboo	Finalist	
2018	Michelle de Kretser	The Life to Come	Finalist	
2019	Gail Jones	The Death of Noah Glass	Winner	
2019	Rodney Hall	A Stolen Season	Finalist	
2019	Melissa Lucashenko	Too Much Lip	Finalist	
2019	Suneeta Peres da Costa	Saudade	Finalist	
2019	Laura Elizabeth Woollett	Beautiful Revolutionary	Finalist	
2020 (Note: The 2020 fiction and poetry judging panel was chaired by Suzanne Leal and included Susan Wyndham, Kerryn Goldsworthy, Philip Mead, and Lucy Neave.)	Tara June Winch	The Yield	Winner	
2020	J. M. Coetzee	The Death of Jesus	Finalist	
2020	Carrie Tiffany	Exploded View	Finalist	
2020	Lucy Treloar	Wolfe Island	Finalist	
2020	Charlotte Wood	The Weekend	Finalist	
2021 (Note: The 2021 fiction and poetry judging panel was chaired by Peter Holbrook, Geoffrey Lehmann, Roslyn Jolly, and Peter Craven.)	Amanda Lohrey	The Labyrinth	Winner	
2021	K. M. Kruimink	A Treacherous Country	Finalist	
2021	Jo Lennan	In the Time of Foxes	Finalist	
2021	Andrew Pippos	Lucky's	Finalist	
2021	Evie Wyld	The Bass Rock	Finalist	
2022	Nicolas Rothwell	Red Heaven	Winner	
2022	Tony Birch	Dark as Last Night	Finalist	
2022	Stephen Downes	The Hands of Pianists	Finalist	
2022	Hannah Kent	Devotion	Finalist	
2022	Angela O'Keeffe	Night Blue	Finalist	
2023	Jessica Au	Cold Enough for Snow	Winner	
2023	Fiona McFarlane	The Sun Walks Down	Finalist	
2023	George Haddad	Losing Face	Finalist	
2023	Paddy O'Reilly	Other Houses	Finalist	
2023	Yumna Kassab	The Lovers	Finalist	
2024	André Dao	Anam	Winner	
2024	Kate Grenville	Restless Dolly Maunder	Finalist	
2024	Melissa Lucashenko	Edenglassie	Finalist	
2024	Catherine McNamara	The Carnal Fugues	Finalist	
2024	Charlotte Wood	Stone Yard Devotional	Finalist	
2025	Michelle de Kretser	Theory & Practice	Winner	
2025	Emily Maguire	Rapture	Finalist	
2025	Fiona McFarlane	Highway 13	Finalist	
2025	Mykaela Saunders	Always Will Be: Stories of Goori Sovereignty from the Futures of the Tweed	Finalist	
2025	Tim Winton	Juice	Finalist	
2026	Leonie Norrington, Merrkiyawuy Ganambarr-Stubbs, Djawa Burarrwanga & Djawundil Maymuru	A Piece of Red Cloth	Winner	
2026	Rhett Davis	Arborescence	Finalist	
2026	Merlinda Bobis	In the Name of the Trees	Finalist	
2026	Gretchen Shirm	Out of the Woods	Finalist	
2026	Moreno Giovannoni	The Immigrants: Fabula Mirabilis, or A Wonderful Story	Finalist	

=== Nonfiction ===
PMLA for Nonfiction winners and shortlists
Year	Author	Title	Result	Ref.
2008 (Note: The 2008 nonfiction judges' panel was Sally Morgan (indigenous artist and author) and John Doyle (comedian and script writer). The committee was chaired by Hilary Charlesworth, an academic.)	Philip Jones	Ochre and Rust: Artefacts and Encounters on Australian Frontiers	Winner	
2008	Philip Dwyer	Napoleon: The Path to Power, 1769–1799	Finalist	
2008	Raymond Evans	A History of Queensland	Finalist	
2008	Zarah Ghahramani with Robert Hillman	My Life as a Traitor	Finalist	
2008	Germaine Greer	Shakespeare's Wife	Finalist	
2008	Paul Ham	Vietnam: The Australian War	Finalist	
2008	Clive James	Cultural Amnesia: Notes in the Margin of My Time	Finalist	
2009 (Note: The 2009 nonfiction judging panel was chaired by Phillip Adams AO and included Peter Rose and Professor Joan Beaumont FASSA.)	Evelyn Juers	House of Exile: The Life and Times of Heinrich Mann and Nelly-Kroeger Mann	Winner	
2009	Marilyn Lake and Henry Reynolds	Drawing the Global Colour Line	Winner	
2009	James Boyce	Van Diemen's Land	Finalist	
2009	Brian Dibble	Doing Life: A Biography of Elizabeth Jolley	Finalist	
2009	Jenny Hocking	Gough Whitlam: A Moment in History	Finalist	
2009	Chloe Hooper	The Tall Man: Death and Life on Palm Island	Finalist	
2009	David Marr	The Henson Case	Finalist	
2009	Don Watson	American Journeys	Finalist	
2010 (Note: The 2010 nonfiction judging panel was chaired by Brian John AO and included Colin Steele and Dr Faye Sutherland.)	Grace Karskens	The Colony: A History of Early Sydney	Winner	
2010	Michael Cathcart	The Water Dreamers: The Remarkable History of Our Dry Continent	Finalist	
2010	Will Elliott	Strange Places: A Memoir of Mental Illness	Finalist	
2010	John Keane	The Life and Death of Democracy	Finalist	
2010	Mark Tredinnick	The Blue Plateau: A Landscape Memoir	Finalist	
2010	Shirley Walker	The Ghost at the Wedding	Finalist	
2011	Rod Moss	The Hard Light of Day	Winner	
2011	Delia Falconer	Sydney	Finalist	
2011	Paul Kelly	How To Make Gravy	Finalist	
2011	Richard McGregor	The Party	Finalist	
2011	Patrick Wilcken	Claude Lévi-Strauss: The Poet in the Laboratory	Finalist	
2012 (Note: The 2012 non-fiction and history judging panel was chaired by Christopher (Chris) Masters PSM and included Dr Faye Sutherland, Colin Steele, and Dr Michelle Arrow.)	Mark McKenna	An Eye for Eternity: The Life of Manning Clark	Winner	
2012	Geoffrey Blainey	A Short History of Christianity	Finalist	
2012	Alexander Jonathan Brown	Michael Kirby Paradoxes and Principles	Finalist	
2012	Adrian Hyland	Kinglake-350	Finalist	
2012	Anthony Macris	When Horse Became Saw	Finalist	
2013 (Note: The 2013 non-fiction and history judging panel was chaired by Michael Sexton SC and included Colin Steele, Susan Hayes, and Professor Susan Magarey.)	George Megalogenis	The Australian Moment	Winner	
2013	Malcolm Knox	Bradman's War	Finalist	
2013	Chris Masters	Uncommon Soldier	Finalist	
2013	Adrian Mitchell	Plein Airs and Graces	Finalist	
2013	Barbara Santich	Bold Palates	Finalist	
2014 (Note: The 2014 non-fiction and history judging panel was chaired by Gerard Henderson and included Peter Coleman, Ross Fitzgerald, Ida Lichter, and Ann Moya.)	Gabrielle Carey	Moving Among Strangers	Winner	
2014	Helen Trinca	Madeleine: A Life of Madeleine St John	Winner	
2014	Nick Cater	The Lucky Culture	Finalist	
2014	Philip Dwyer	Citizen Emperor	Finalist	
2014	Michael Fullilove	Rendezvous with Destiny	Finalist	
2015 (Note: The 2015 non-fiction and history judging panel was chaired by Ida Litcher and included Peter Coleman, Ross Fitzgerald, and Gerard Henderson.)	Darleen Bungey	John Olsen: An Artist's Life	Winner	
2015	Barrie Cassidy	Private Bill	Finalist	
2015	Helen Garner	This House of Grief: The Story of a Murder Trial	Finalist	
2015	John Gascoigne	Encountering the Pacific: In the Age of Enlightenment	Finalist	
2015	Michael Wilding	Wild Bleak Bohemia: Marcus Clarke, Adam Lindsay Gordon and Henry Kendall	Finalist	
2016	Sheila Fitzpatrick	On Stalin's Team: The Years of Living Dangerously in Soviet Politics	Winner	
2016	Karen Lamb	Thea Astley: Inventing her own Weather	Winner	
2016	Julie Cotter	Tom Roberts and the Art of Portraiture	Finalist	
2016	Drusilla Modjeska	Second Half First	Finalist	
2016	Tim Winton	Island Home	Finalist	
2017 (Note: The 2017 non-fiction and history judging panel was chaired by Lynette Russell and included Helen Trinca, Richard Waterhouse, Greg Melleuish, and Sally Warhaft.)	Nicolas Rothwell	Quicksilver	Winner	
2017	Suzanne Falkiner	Mick: A Life of Randolph Stow	Finalist	
2017	Tom Griffiths	The Art of Time Travel: Historians and their Craft	Finalist	
2017	Thornton McCamish	Our Man Elsewhere: In Search of Alan Moorehead	Finalist	
2017	Sebastian Smee	The Art of Rivalry: Four Friendships, Betrayals, and Breakthroughs in Modern Art	Finalist	
2018 (Note: The 2018 non-fiction and history judging panel was chaired by Lynette Russell and included Helen Trinca, Richard Waterhouse, Greg Melleuish, and Sally Warhaft.)	Richard McGregor	Asia's Reckoning	Winner	
2018	Sheila Fitzpatrick	Mischka's War: A European Odyssey of the 1940s	Finalist	
2018	Chris Masters	No Front Line: Australia's Special Forces at War in Afghanistan	Finalist	
2018	Stuart Kells	The Library: A Catalogue of Wonders	Finalist	
2018	Jelena Dokic and Jessica Halloran	Unbreakable	Finalist	
2019	Paul Genoni and Tanya Dalziell	Half the Perfect World: Writers, Dreamers and Drifters on Hydra, 1955–1964	Winner	
2019	Cynthia Banham	A Certain Light: A Memoir of Family, Loss and Hope	Finalist	
2019	Gabrielle Chan	Rusted Off: Why Country Australia Is Fed Up	Finalist	
2019	Chloe Hooper	The Arsonist: A Mind on Fire	Finalist	
2019	Maria Tumarkin	Axiomatic	Finalist	
2020 (Note: The 2020 non-fiction and history judging panel was chaired by Richard Waterhouse and included Sally Warhaft, John Fitzgerald, and John Maynard.)	Gay'Wu Group of Women	Songspirals: Sharing Women's Wisdom of Country through Songlines	Winner	
2020	Christina Thompson	Sea People: The Puzzle of Polynesia	Winner	
2020	Tim Bonyhady	The Enchantment of the Long-haired Rat	Finalist	
2020	Jess Hill	See What You Made Me Do	Finalist	
2020	Jessica White	Hearing Maud: A Journey for a Voice	Finalist	
2021 (Note: The 2021 non-fiction and Australian history judging panel was chaired by Andrew Tink and included Chris Mitchell, Troy Bramston, Deborah Hope, and Gail Pearson.)	Quentin Sprague	The Stranger Artist: Life at the Edge of Kimberley Painting	Winner	
2021	Andrew Darby	Flight Lines: Across the Globe on a Journey with the Astonishing Ultramarathon Birds	Finalist	
2021	Tegan Bennett Daylight	The Details: On Love, Death and Reading	Finalist	
2021	Cassandra Pybus	Truganini: Journey Through the Apocalypse	Finalist	
2021	Suzanne Smith	The Altar Boys	Finalist	
2022	Mark Willacy	Rogue Forces: An Explosive Insiders' Account of Australian SAS War Crimes in Afghanistan	Winner	
2022	Paul Cleary	Title Fight: How the Yindjibarndi Battled and Defeated a Mining Giant	Finalist	
2022	Peter Edwell	The Case That Stopped a Nation: The Archibald Prize controversy of 1944	Finalist	
2022	John Safran	Puff Piece	Finalist	
2022	Chelsea Watego	Another Day in the Colony	Finalist	
2023	Sam Vincent	My Father and Other Animals: How I took on the family farm	Winner	
2023	Brigitta Olubas	Shirley Hazzard: A writing life	Finalist	
2023	Debra Dank	We Come With This Place	Finalist	
2023	Louisa Lim	Indelible City: Dispossession and defiance in Hong Kong	Finalist	
2023	Thom van Dooren	A World in a Shell: Snail stories for a time of extinctions	Finalist	
2024	Daniel Browning	Close to the Subject: Selected Works	Winner	
2024	Sarah Firth	Eventually Everything Connects	Finalist	
2024	Maggie MacKellar	Graft: Motherhood, Family and a Year on the Land	Finalist	
2024	Alex Miller	A Kind of Confession	Finalist	
2024	Harry Saddler	A Clear Flowing Yarra	Finalist	
2025	Rick Morton	Mean Streak	Winner	
2025	James Bradley	Deep Water	Finalist	
2025	Adele Dumont	The Pulling	Finalist	
2025	Khin Myint	Fragile Creatures: A Memoir	Finalist	
2025	Samah Sabawi	Cactus Pear for My Beloved	Finalist	
2026	Kate Wild	The Red House	Winner	
2026	Tom McIlroy	Blue Poles: Jackson Pollock, Gough Whitlam and the Painting that Changed a Nation	Finalist	
2026	S. Shakthidharan	Gather Up Your World in One Long Breath	Finalist	
2026	Debra Dank	Terraglossia	Finalist	
2026	Quentin Sprague	What Artists See	Finalist	

=== Poetry ===
PMLA for Poetry winners and shortlists
Year	Author	Title	Result	Ref.
2012 (Note: The 2012 judging panel for fiction and poetry was chaired by Joel Becker and included Dr Lyn Gallacher, Professor Chris Wallace-Crabbe AM, and Peter Craven.)	Luke Davies	Interferon Psalms	Winner	
2012	Ali Alizadeh	Ashes in the Air	Finalist	
2012	John Kinsella	Armour	Finalist	
2012	John Mateer	Southern Barbarians	Finalist	
2012	Gig Ryan	New and Selected Poems	Finalist	
2013 (Note: The 2013 fiction and poetry judging panel was chaired by Joel Becker and included Professor Chris Wallace-Crabbe AM, Professor Philip Mead, and Jane Sullivan.)	John Kinsella	Jam Tree Gully: Poems	Winner	
2013	Eileen Chong	Burning Rice	Finalist	
2013	Lisa Jacobson	The Sunlit Zone	Finalist	
2013	Jennifer Maiden	Liquid Nitrogen	Finalist	
2013	Peter Rose	Crimson Crop	Finalist	
2014 (Note: The 2014 fiction and poetry judging panel was chaired by Louise Adler and included Jamie Grant, Margie Bryant, Les Murray, and Robert Gray.)	Melinda Smith	Drag Down to Unlock or Place an Emergency Call	Winner	
2014	Sarah Day	Tempo	Finalist	
2014	Stephen Edgar	Eldershaw	Finalist	
2014	Geoff Page	1953	Finalist	
2014	Jakob Ziguras	Chains of Snow	Finalist	
2015 (Note: The 2015 fiction and poetry judging panel was chaired by Louise Adler and included Des Cowley, Jamie Grant, and Robert Gray.)	Geoffrey Lehmann	Poems 1957–2013	Winner	
2015	Judith Beveridge	Devadatta's Poems	Finalist	
2015	Stephen Edgar	Exhibits of the Sun	Finalist	
2015	David Malouf	Earth Hour	Finalist	
2015	Alex Skovron	Towards the Equator: New & Selected Poems	Finalist	
2016	Sarah Holland-Batt	The Hazards	Winner	
2016	Robert Adamson	Net Needle	Finalist	
2016	Michael Farrell	Cocky's Joy	Finalist	
2016	Les Murray	Waiting for the Past	Finalist	
2016	Simon West	The Ladder	Finalist	
2017 (Note: The 2017 fiction and poetry judging panel was chaired by Bronwyn Lea and included Kathy Shand, James Ley, Susan Wyndham, and Sarah Holland-Batt.)	Anthony Lawrence	Headwaters	Winner	
2017	Eileen Chong	Painting Red Orchids	Finalist	
2017	Joel Deane	Year of the Wasp	Finalist	
2017	Liam Ferney	Content	Finalist	
2017	Antigone Kefala	Fragments	Finalist	
2018 (Note: The 2018 fiction and poetry judging panel was chaired by Bronwyn Lea and included Kathy Shand, James Ley, Susan Wyndham, and Sarah Holland-Batt.)	Brian Castro	Blindness and Rage: A Phantasmagoria	Winner	
2018	Adam Aitken	Archipelago	Finalist	
2018	Bonny Cassidy	Chatelaine	Finalist	
2018	Fiona Wright	Domestic Interior	Finalist	
2018	Stephen Edgar	Transparencies	Finalist	
2019	Judith Beveridge	Sun Music: New and Selected Poems	Winner	
2019	Pam Brown	Click Here For What We Do	Finalist	
2019	Keri Glastonbury	Newcastle Sonnets	Finalist	
2019	Jill Jones	Viva the Real	Finalist	
2019	Alison Whittaker	BlakWork	Finalist	
2020 (Note: The 2020 fiction and poetry judging panel was chaired by Suzanne Leal and included Susan Wyndham, Kerryn Goldsworthy, Philip Mead, and Lucy Neave.)	Omar Sakr	The Lost Arabs	Winner	
2020	П. O.	Heide	Finalist	
2020	Nandi Chinna	The Future Keepers	Finalist	
2020	Lisa Gorton	Empirical	Finalist	
2020	L. K. Holt	Birth Plan	Finalist	
2021 (Note: The 2021 fiction and poetry judging panel was chaired by Peter Holbrook, Geoffrey Lehmann, Roslyn Jolly, and Peter Craven.)	Stephen Edgar	The Strangest Place: New and Selected Poems	Winner	
2021	Laurie Duggan	Homer Street	Finalist	
2021	Jaya Savige	Change Machine	Finalist	
2021	John A. Scott	Shorter Lives	Finalist	
2021	Mags Webster	Nothing to Declare	Finalist	
2022	Andy Jackson	Human Looking	Winner	
2022	Jordie Albiston	Fifteeners	Finalist	
2022	John Foulcher	Dancing with Stephen Hawking	Finalist	
2022	Caitlin Maling	Fish Work	Finalist	
2022	Elfie Shiosaki	Homecoming	Finalist	
2023	Gavin Yuan Gao	At the Altar of Touch	Winner	
2023	Lionel Fogarty	Harvest Lingo	Finalist	
2023	Rae White	Exactly As I Am	Finalist	
2023	Sarah Holland-Batt	The Jaguar	Finalist	
2023	Scott-Patrick Mitchell	Clean	Finalist	
2024	Amy Crutchfield	The Cyprian	Winner	
2024	Luke Beesley	In the Photograph	Finalist	
2024	Ali Cobby Eckermann	She Is the Earth	Finalist	
2024	Jennifer Maiden	Golden Bridge: New Poems	Finalist	
2024	Autumn Royal	The Drama Student	Finalist	
2025	David Brooks	The Other Side of Daylight: New and Selected Poems	Winner	
2025	Peter Boyle	Companions, Ancestors, Inscriptions	Finalist	
2025	Hasib Hourani	rock flight	Finalist	
2025	Barrina South	Makarra	Finalist	
2025	Petra White	That Galloping Horse	Finalist	
2026	Ender Başkan	Two Hundred Million Musketeers	Winner	
2026	John Kinsella	Ghost of Myself	Finalist	
2026	Jill Jones	How to Emerge	Finalist	
2026	Eunice Andrada	KONTRA	Finalist	
2026	Evelyn Araluen	The Rot	Finalist	

=== Young adult fiction ===
PMLA for Young Adult Fiction winners and shortlists
Year	Author	Title	Result	Ref.
2010 (Note: The 2010 judging panel for children's and young adult fiction was chaired by Dr Robyn Sheahan-Bright and included Mike Shuttleworth and Mary-Ruth Mendel.)	Bill Condon	Confessions of a Liar, Thief and Failed Sex God	Winner	
2010	Lucy Christopher	Stolen	Finalist	
2010	Judith Clarke	The Winds of Heaven	Finalist	
2010	Cassandra Golds	The Museum of Mary Child	Finalist	
2010	Phillip Gwynne	Swerve	Finalist	
2010	David Metzenthen	Jarvis 24	Finalist	
2010	Gabrielle Williams	Beatle Meets Destiny	Finalist	
2011	Cath Crowley	Graffiti Moon	Winner	
2011	Laura Buzo	Good Oil	Finalist	
2011	Cassandra Golds	The Three Loves of Persimmon	Finalist	
2011	Joanne Horniman	About a Girl	Finalist	
2011	Melina Marchetta	The Piper's Son	Finalist	
2012 (Note: The 2012 children's and young adult fiction judging panel was chaired by Judith White and included Mary-Ruth Mendel and Robert (Bob) Sessions.)	Robert Newton	When We Were Two	Winner	
2012	Bill Condon	A Straight Line to My Heart	Finalist	
2012	Barry Jonsberg	Being Here	Finalist	
2012	Sue Lawson	Pan's Whisper	Finalist	
2012	Sue Saliba	Alaska	Finalist	
2013 (Note: The 2013 children's and young adult fiction judging panel was chaired by Judith White and included Adele Rice and Robert (Bob) Sessions.)	Bruce Pascoe	Fog a Dox	Winner	
2013	Jessica Davidson	Everything Left Unsaid	Finalist	
2013	Sonya Hartnett	The Children of the King	Finalist	
2013	Sue McPherson	Grace Beside Me	Finalist	
2013	Vikki Wakefield	Friday Brown	Finalist	
2014 (Note: The 2014 children's and young adult fiction judging panel was chaired by Mike Shuttleworth and included Belle Alderman, Kate Colley, Mark MacLeod, and Irini Savvides.)	Felicity Castagna	The Incredible Here and Now	Winner	
2014	Cassandra Golds	Pureheart	Finalist	
2014	Simmone Howell	Girl Defective	Finalist	
2014	Melissa Keil	Life in Outer Space	Finalist	
2014	Will Kostakis	The First Third	Finalist	
2015 (Note: The 2015 children's and young adult fiction judging panel was chaired by Mike Shuttleworth and included Belle Alderman, Kate Colley, Mark MacLeod, and Irini Savvides.)	Claire Zorn	The Protected	Winner	
2015	Darren Groth	Are You Seeing Me?	Finalist	
2015	Rebecca Lim	The Astrologer's Daughter	Finalist	
2015	Doug MacLeod	Tigers on the Beach	Finalist	
2015	Diana Sweeney	The Minnow	Finalist	
2016	Meg McKinlay	A Single Stone	Winner	
2016	Jane Harrison	Becoming Kirrali Lewis	Finalist	
2016	Amie Kaufman and Jay Kristoff	Illuminae: The Illuminae Files_01	Finalist	
2016	Vikki Wakefield	In Between Days	Finalist	
2016	Lili Wilkinson	Green Valentine	Finalist	
2017 (Note: The 2017 children's and young adult fiction judging panel was chaired by Margot Hillel and included Joy Lawn, Margrete Lamond, Robyn Ewing, and Sue Whiting.)	Cath Crowley	Words in Deep Blue	Winner	
2017	Zana Fraillon	The Bone Sparrow	Finalist	
2017	Glenda Millard	The Stars at Oktober Bend	Finalist	
2017	Dianne Touchell	Forgetting Foster	Finalist	
2017	Claire Zorn	One Would Think Deep	Finalist	
2018 (Note: The 2018 children's and young adult fiction judging panel was chaired by Margot Hillel and included Joy Lawn, Kerry Neary, Robyn Ewing, and Sue Whiting.)	Richard Yaxley	This Is My Song	Winner	
2018	Demet Divaroren	Living on Hope Street	Finalist	
2018	Judith Clarke	My Lovely Frankie	Finalist	
2018	Bruce Whatley	Ruben	Finalist	
2018	Zana Fraillon	The Ones that Disappeared	Finalist	
2019	Michael Gerard Bauer	The Things That Will Not Stand	Winner	
2019	Clare Atkins	Between Us	Finalist	
2019	Karen Foxlee	Lenny's Book of Everything	Finalist	
2019	Sharon Kernot	The Art of Taxidermy	Finalist	
2019	Shaun Tan	Cicada	Finalist	
2020 (Note: The 2020 children's and young adult fiction judging panel was chaired by Margot Hillel and included Margrete Lamond, Kirli Saunders, James Roy, and Demet Divaroren.)	Helena Fox	How It Feels to Float	Winner	
2020	Wai Chim	The Surprising Power of a Good Dumpling	Finalist	
2020	Neil Grant	The Honeyman and the Hunter	Finalist	
2020	Malla Nunn	When the Ground Is Hard	Finalist	
2020	Vikki Wakefield	This Is How We Change the Ending	Finalist	
2021 (Note: The 2020 children's and young adult fiction judging panel was chaired by James Roy and included Demet Divaroren, Erica Wagner, Paula Kelly Paull, and Richard Yaxley.)	Cath Moore	Metal Fish, Falling Snow	Winner	
2021	Rawah Arja	The F Team	Finalist	
2021	Davina Bell	The End of the World Is Bigger than Love	Finalist	
2021	Jane Godwin	When Rain Turns to Snow	Finalist	
2021	Georgina Young	Loner	Finalist	
2022	Leanne Hall	The Gaps	Winner	
2022	Safdar Ahmed	Still Alive: Notes from Australia's Immigration Detention System	Finalist	
2022	Clayton Zame Comber	100 Remarkable Feats of Xander Maz	Finalist	
2022	Rebecca Lim	Tiger Daughter	Finalist	
2022	Archie Roach	Tell Me Why (For Young Adults)	Finalist	
2023	Sarah Winifred Searle	The Greatest Thing	Winner	
2023	Carly Nugent	Sugar	Finalist	
2023	Eva Collins	Ask No Questions	Finalist	
2023	Lystra Rose	The Upwelling	Finalist	
2023	Mike Lucas	What We All Saw	Finalist	
2024	Will Kostakis	We Could Be Something	Winner	
2024	Karen Comer	Grace Notes	Finalist	
2024	Melissa Kang & Yumi Stynes	Welcome to Sex	Finalist	
2024	Gary Lonesborough	We Didn't Think It Through	Finalist	
2024	Lili Wilkinson	A Hunger of Thorns	Finalist	
2025	Krystal Sutherland	The Invocations	Winner	
2025	Sophie Beer	Thunderhead	Finalist	
2025	Kate Emery	My Family and Other Suspects	Finalist	
2025	Jinyoung Kim & Sabina Patawaran	The Anti-Racism Kit: A Guide for High School Students	Finalist	
2025	Emma Lord	Anomaly	Finalist	
2026	Pip Harry	Drift	Winner	
2026	Demet Divaroren	Blue Moon Bride	Finalist	
2026	Miranda Luby	The Edge of Everything	Finalist	
2026	Robbie Coburn	The Foal in the Wire	Finalist	
2026	Margot McGovern	This Stays Between Us	Finalist	
