= Victorian Premier's Prize for Writing for Young Adults =

The Victorian Premier's Prize for Writing for Young Adults, formerly known as the Victorian Premier's Prize for Young Adult Fiction, is a prize category in the annual Victorian Premier's Literary Award. As of 2011 it has an enumeration of A$25,000. The winner of this category prize vies with 4 other category winners for overall Victorian Prize for Literature valued at an additional A$100,000.

From inception in 1999 to 2010, the award was administered by the State Library of Australia and known as the Victorian Premier's Prize for Young Adult Fiction. In 2011 stewardship changed to the Wheeler Centre where the prize was re-launched with a new name, rules and prize amount. According to the State Library of Australia, "This prize [was] offered for a published work of fiction or collection of short stories written for a readership between the ages of 13 and 18. Publishers may consider submitting books that are appropriate to young adult readers but not published under a young adult imprint. Literary merit is the major judging criterion. In the case of illustrated books, the additional criterion of literary and artistic unity is considered."

== Honorees ==
Year	Author	Title	Result	Ref.
2011	Cassandra Golds	The Three Loves of Persimmon	Winner	
2011	Cath Crowley	Graffiti Moon	Finalist	
2011	Doug MacLeod	The Life of a Teenage Body-Snatcher	Finalist	
2012	John Larkin	The Shadow Girl	Winner	
2012	Doug MacLeod	The Shiny Guys	Finalist	
2012	Vikki Wakefield	All I Ever Wanted	Finalist	
2013	Presented in January 2014 (see 2014 entry) for books published in 2013.			
2014	Barry Jonsberg	My Life as an Alphabet	Winner	
2014	Vikki Wakefield	Friday Brown	Finalist	
2014	Fiona Wood	Wildlife	Finalist	
2015	Claire Zorn	The Protected	Winner	
2015	Justine Larbalestier	Razorhurst	Finalist	
2015	Jaclyn Moriarty	The Cracks in the Mountain	Finalist	
2016	Marlee Jane Ward	Welcome to Orphancorp	Winner	
2016	Meg McKinlay	A Single Stone	Finalist	
2016	Sally Morgan	Sister Heart	Finalist	
2017	Randa Abdel-Fattah	When Michael Met Mina	Winner	
2017	Zana Fraillon	The Bone Sparrow	Finalist	
2017	Emily Gale	The Other Side of Summer	Finalist	
2018	Demet Divaroren	Living on Hope Street	Winner	
2018	Alison Evans	Ida	Finalist	
2018	Pip Harry	Because of You	Finalist	
2019	Ambelin Kwaymullina and Ezekiel Kwaymullina	Catching Teller Crow	Winner	
2019	Clare Atkins	Between Us	Finalist	
2019	Erin Gough	Amelia Westlake	Finalist	
2020	Helena Fox	How It Feels to Float	Winner	
2020	Holden Sheppard	Invisible Boys	Finalist	
2020	Vikki Wakefield	This Is How We Change the Ending	Finalist	
2021	Cath Moore	Metal Fish, Falling Snow	Winner	
2021	Rawah Arja	The F Team	Finalist	
2021	Christie Nieman	Where We Begin	Finalist	
2022	Felicity Castagna	Girls in Boys' Cars	Winner	
2022	Leanne Hall	The Gaps	Finalist	
2022	Rebecca Lim	Tiger Daughter	Finalist	
2023	Kate Murray	We Who Hunt the Hollow	Winner	
2023	Matt Ottley	The Tree of Ecstasy and Unbearable Sadness	Finalist	
2023	Rhiannon Wilde	Where You Left Us	Finalist	
2024	Lili Wilkinson	A Hunger of Thorns	Winner	
2024	Helena Fox	The Quiet and the Loud	Finalist	
2024	Will Kostakis	We Could Be Something	Finalist	
2025	Emma Lord	Anomaly	Winner	
2025	Ambelin Kwaymullina	Liar's Test	Finalist	
2025	Barry Jonsberg	Smoke & Mirrors	Finalist	
2026	Margo McGovern	This Stays Between Us	Winner	
2026	Ange Crawford	How to Be Normal	Finalist	
2026	Jasmin McGaughey	Moonlight and Dust	Finalist	

== Victorian Premier's Prize for Young Adult Fiction ==
Year	Author	Title	Publisher	Ref.
1988	John Marsden	So Much to Tell You	Walter McVitty Books	
1989	Caroline Macdonald	The Lake at the End of the World	Hodder and Stoughton	
1990	Diana Kidd	Onion Tears	Collins	
1991	Gary Crew	Strange Objects	Heinemann	
1992	Eleanor Nilsson	The House Guest	Viking	
1993	Anna Fienberg	Ariel, Zed and the Secret of Life	Allen and Unwin	
1994	Ursula Dubosarsky	The White Guinea-Pig	Viking Books	
1995	Allan Baillie	Songman	Viking Books	
1996	Sonya Hartnett	Sleeping Dogs	Viking Books	
1997	Catherine Jinks	Pagan's Scribe	Omnibus Books	
1998	Judith Clarke	Night Train	Penguin	
1999	Phillip Gwynne	Deadly, Unna?	Penguin	
2000	Helen Barnes	Killing Aurora	Penguin	
2001	James Moloney	Touch Me	University of Queensland Press	
2002	Meme McDonald and Boori Monty Pryor	Njunjul the Sun	Allen & Unwin	
2003	David Metzenthen	Wildlight: A Journey	Penguin	
2004	Margo Lanagan	Black Juice	Allen & Unwin	
2005	Scott Westerfeld	So Yesterday	Penguin	
2006	Ursula Dubosarsky	Theodora's Gift	Viking/Penguin	
2007	Simmone Howell	Notes from the Teenage Underground	Pan Macmillan	
2008	Brigid Lowry	Tomorrow All Will Be Beautiful	Allen & Unwin	
2009	Sue Saliba	Something in the World Called Love	Penguin	
2010	Kirsty Eagar	Raw Blue	Penguin	
