= Children's Book of the Year Award: Early Childhood =

Australian literary award from 2001

- Awarded for: Excellence in Australian early childhood books
- Country: Australia
- Presented by: Children's Book Council of Australia
- First award: 2001
- Website: http://cbca.org.au/index.htm

The Children's Book of the Year Award: Early Childhood has been presented annually since 2001 by the Children's Book Council of Australia (CBCA).

The Award "will be made to outstanding books of fiction, drama, poetry or concept books for children who are at pre-reading or early stages of reading. They may be picture books, picture storybooks or texts in which illustrations play a substantial part in the storytelling or concept development."

== Award winners ==
=== 2000s ===
Year	Author	Title	Publisher
2001	Catherine Jinks, illus. Andrew McLean	You'll Wake the Baby!	Penguin Books
2002	Bob Graham	Let's Get a Pup!	Walker Books
2003	Penny Matthews, illus. Andrew McLean	A Year on Our Farm	Omnibus Books
2004	Pamela Allen	Grandpa and Thomas	Viking Books
2005	Mem Fox, illus. Judy Horacek	Where Is the Green Sheep?	Viking Books
2006	Deborah Niland	Annie's Chair	Viking Books
2007	Libby Gleeson, illus. Freya Blackwood	Amy and Louis	Scholastic Press
2008	Aaron Blabey	Pearl Barley and Charlie Parsley	Viking Books
2009	Bob Graham	How to Heal a Broken Wing	Walker Books

=== 2010s ===
Year	Author	Title	Publisher	Ref.
2010	Lisa Shanahan, illus. Emma Quay	Bear & Chook by the Sea	Lothian Books	
2011	Jan Ormerod, illus. Freya Blackwood	Maudie and Bear	Little Hare Books	
2012	Nick Bland, illus. Freya Blackwood	The Runaway Hug	Scholastic Press, Scholastic Australia	
2013	Emma Allen, illus. Freya Blackwood	The Terrible Suitcase	Little Hare, Hardie Grant Egmont	
2014	Jan Ormerod, illus. Andrew Joyner	The Swap	Scholastic Press, Scholastic Australia	
2015	Libby Gleeson, illus. Freya Blackwood	Go to Sleep, Jessie!	Little Hare, Hardie Grant Egmont	
2016	Anna Walker	Mr Huff	Penguin Random House	
2017	Johanna Bell, illus. Dion Beasley	Go Home, Cheeky Animals!	Allen & Unwin	
2018	Michael Gerard Bauer, illus. Chrissie Krebs	Rodney Loses It!	Omnibus Books	
2019	Alison Lester	Tricky's Bad Day	Affirm	

=== 2020s ===
Year	Author	Title	Publisher	Ref.
2020	Frances Watts	My Friend Fred	Allen & Unwin	
2021	Libby Hathorn and Lisa Hathorn-Jarman, illus. Mel Pearce	No! Never!	Lothian	
2022	Andrea Rowe, illus. Hannah Sommerville	Jetty Jumping	Hardie Grant	
2023	Vicki Conley, illus. Max Hamilton	Where the Lyrebird Lives	Windy Hollow	
2024	Briony Stewart	Gymnastica Fantastica!	Lothian	
2025	Darren McCallum, illus. by Craig Smith	The Wobbly Bike	Walker	
2026	Rae Tan	The Emperor's Egg	Lothian	

== See also ==
- List of CBCA Awards
- List of Australian literary awards
