= Golds =

Golds may refer to:

- Golds (ethnic group), a Tungusic people of the Far East
- Golds (jewelry), a type of jewelry worn over the teeth
- Golds (surname), an English surname

== See also ==
- Gold (disambiguation)
