= Paddy O'Reilly =

Paddy O'Reilly may refer to:

- Paddy O'Reilly (footballer) (1898–1974), Irish footballer
- Paddy O'Reilly (writer), multiple award-winning Australian writer
