= Helen Trinca =

Australian journalist and author

Helen Trinca is an Australian journalist and author. After stints as managing editor, European correspondent, and editor of The Weekend Australian Magazine, she is editor of the business magazine insert The Deal at The Australian.

== Background ==
Trinca was born in Perth and graduated from the city's University of Western Australia with a BA in English and anthropology. She began her career in journalism on The West Australian. She moved to Sydney in 1980.

A former contributor to the Griffith Review and Australasian Business Intelligence, Trinca previously held senior positions at The Sydney Morning Herald.

== Writing ==
Her third book, Madeleine, is a biography of Madeleine St John, the first Australian female writer to be shortlisted for the Man Booker Prize in 1997. Trinca's book was a joint winner of the 2014 Prime Minister's Literary Awards.

Trinca was shortlisted for the 2024 Hazel Rowley Literary Fellowship for her proposed biography of Australian writer Elizabeth Harrower. Titled Looking for Elizabeth: The Life of Elizabeth Harrower, it was published in July 2025.

== Bibliography ==
- Waterfront: The Battle that Changed Australia, (Doubleday (publisher)/Transworld, 2000) co-authored with Anne Davies, ISBN 1864710233
- Better than Sex: How a Whole Generation Got Hooked on Work, (Random House Australia, 2004) co-authored with Catherine Fox, ISBN 1740511964
- Madeleine: A Life of Madeleine St John, (Text Publishing, 2013) ISBN 9781921922848
- Looking for Elizabeth: The Life of Elizabeth Harrower. La Trobe University Press. July 2025. ISBN 9781760645755.
