= The Life of Houses =

2015 novel by Australian author Lisa Gorton

- Author: Lisa Gorton
- Language: English
- Genre: Novel
- Publisher: Giramondo Publishing
- Publication date: 1 April 2015
- Publication place: Australia
- Media type: Print
- Pages: 216 pp.
- Awards: 2016 Prime Minister's Literary Award – Fiction
- ISBN: 9781922146809
- Preceded by: Cloudland

The Life of Houses (2015) is a novel by Australian writer Lisa Gorton. It was originally published by Giramondo Publishing in Australia in 2015.

== Synopsis ==
The novel follows three generations of one family, across the timespan of a week, who experience of period of disruption and crisis. The grandparents face a health scare and must leave their comfortable domestic life; the parents appearing to be in the process of separating over the mother's extra-marital affair, and the youngest daughter has reached a major turning-point in her teenage years.

== Publishing history ==
After its initial publication in Australia by Giramondo Publishing in 2015, the novel has not been reprinted.

== Dedication ==
- Dedication: "For my children Kelso, Toby and Penelope"

== Critical reception ==
Writing in The Sydney Review of Books critic Kerryn Goldsworthy stated: "The novel’s pace may seem leisurely, its voice measured and its mode of expression thoughtful and reflective, but its subject matter is operatic: sex, class, family, love, death, change, and the pull of the past...Gorton’s way of seeing the world and of naming its parts is the quality that sets her debut novel apart from the mass of fiction currently being published in Australia...Gorton’s novel is less of an argument and more of a painting, a visual representation of a certain kind of family in a particular time and place, a picture from which it is possible to deduce its subjects’ character, class, and mood: a Vermeer or a Pieter de Hooch, showing rooms in shadowy houses and ordinary people in attitudes of contemplation, standing in a certain slant of light."

In The Australian Book Review Catriona Menzies-Pike wrote: "The lives of the characters in this novel can’t be unpicked from the spaces they inhabit...How do our houses define us? Gorton’s reflections on space and identity have little in common with the real-estate fixations of reality television...The Life of Houses is a nuanced and intelligent reflection on the spaces mothers and daughters share."

== Awards ==
- 2016 Prime Minister's Literary Awards – Fiction, joint winner
- 2016 New South Wales Premier's Literary Awards – Christina Stead Prize for Fiction, shortlisted

== See also ==
- 2015 in Australian literature
