= Zarah Ghahramani =

Iranian-born author living in Australia

Zarah Ghahramani (Persian: زاراە قهرمانی) is an Iranian-born Kurdish author living in Australia who wrote My Life as a Traitor, an award-winning memoir of her imprisonment and torture in Evin Prison.

== Life ==
Ghahramani was born and raised in Tehran, Iran in 1981 as the daughter of a Kurdish father who was a military officer under the Shah of Iran, and a mother who raised Ghahramani in the Zoroastrian faith. Because Ghahramani's family strongly disagreed with the country's conservative rulers, she was politically active from an early age. However, her "rage at the government was a matter of personal style as much as of principle," resulting from the "dos and don'ts" of the life she was expected to live under.

== Arrest and imprisonment ==
When Ghahramani was a 20-year-old college student at the University of Tehran, she was involved in student politics. After a period of political activism that displeased the Iranian authorities, she was arrested and imprisoned in the infamous Evin prison. Charged with "inciting crimes against the people of the Islamic Republic of Iran," Ghahramani was beaten, interrogated and locked in solitary confinement. At the end of her 30-day sentence, she was released.

Because Ghahraman was at risk of being arrested again, the writer Robert Hillman helped her to escape the country. She currently lives in Australia.

== Writings ==
In 2007 Ghahramani and Hillman published My Life as a Traitor, a biographical account of Ghahramani's life and imprisonment. The book won the award for Australian Small Publisher of the Year for 2006. and was shortlisted for the 2008 Prime Minister's Literary Awards.

Ghahramani continues to write, most recently publishing an essay in the anthology How They See Us, edited by James Atlas.

Other writings/publications by Zarah Ghahramani include:

- Ghahramani, Zarah. Forced to Betrayal: My Escape from the Mullahs. ISBN 978-3-547-71141-7.
