= Leanne Hall (author) =

Australian author

- Occupation: Author
- Writing career
- Notable works: This is Shyness, Iris and the Tiger, The Gaps
- Notable awards: Text Prize for Young Adult and Children's Writing, Patricia Wrightson Prize, Davitt Award, Adelaide Festival Award for Literature, Ethel Turner Prize, Prime Minister's Literary Award

Leanne Hall is an Australian author of young adult and children's fiction.

Hall's debut novel This is Shyness won the Text Prize for Young Adult and Children's Writing (2009). Her novel Iris and the Tiger won the Patricia Wrightson Prize for Children's Literature (2017). Her most recent novel, The Gaps, won the Davitt Award for Best Young Adult Novel, Adelaide Festival Award for Literature: Young Adult Fiction, Ethel Turner Prize for Young People's Literature, and Prime Minister's Literary Award for Young Adult.

== Biography ==
In 2013, Hall was an Asialink Artist in Residence at Peking University. In 2014, she participated in Australian Writers Week in China.

Hall graduated from the University of Sydney with a Ph.D. titled "Transitioning through injury: A phenomenological Approach for Ultra-Runners".

== Awards and honors ==
Iris and the Tiger was selected for The White Ravens Catalogue (2017).

In 2022, Kirkus Reviews named The Gaps one of the best young adult novels of the year.

Awards for Hall's writing
Year	Title	Award	Result	Ref.
2009	This Is Shyness	Text Prize for Young Adult and Children's Writing	Winner	
2010	This Is Shyness	Western Australian Premier's Book Award for Young Adult	Shortlist	
2011	This Is Shyness	Inky Award for Gold Inky	Shortlist	
2012	Queen of the Night	Inky Award for Gold Inky	Shortlist	
2016	Iris and the Tiger	INDIES Award for Juvenile Fiction (Children's)	Finalist	
2017	Iris and the Tiger	Australian Book Design Awards for Children's Fiction	Shortlist	
2017	Iris and the Tiger	Patricia Wrightson Prize for Children's Literature	Winner	
2018	Iris and the Tiger	Young Australians Best Book Awards: Fiction for Older Readers	Shortlist	
2022	The Gaps	Davitt Award for Best Young Adult Novel	Winner	
2022	The Gaps	Adelaide Festival Award for Literature: Young Adult Fiction	Winner	
2022	The Gaps	NSW Premier's Literary Award: Ethel Turner Prize for Young People's Literature	Winner	
2022	The Gaps	Victorian Premier's Prize for Writing for Young Adults	Shortlist	
2022	The Gaps	Australian Book Industry Award: Book of the Year for Older Children	Shortlist	
2022	The Gaps	Prime Minister's Literary Award for Young Adult	Winner	
2022	The Gaps	Children's Book Council of Australia: Children's Book of the Year Award: Older Readers	Shortlist	

== Publications ==
Hall's short stories have been published in Meanjin, The Age, Best Australian Stories, Sleepers Almanac, Kill Your Darlings, and Growing Up Asian In Australia.

=== Standalone books ===
- Iris and the Tiger (2016)
- The Gaps (2022)

=== Shyness series ===
- This Is Shyness (2010)
- Queen of the Night (2012)
