= The Zookeeper's War =

Book by Steven Conte

- First edition
- Author: Steven Conte
- Language: English
- Genre: novel
- Publisher: Fourth Estate, Australia
- Publication date: 2007
- Publication place: Australia
- Media type: Print (Paperback)
- Pages: 374
- ISBN: 9780732285166

The Zookeeper's War (2007) is a novel by Australian author Steven Conte. It won the inaugural Prime Minister's Literary Award for Fiction in 2008.

== Plot summary ==
The novel tells the story of Vera Frey, a young Australian who marries the heir to Berlin Zoo just prior to World War II. As the zoo's workers are conscripted and replaced by PoWs, Vera and her husband Axel fight to maintain the zoo's standards and to survive as the world about them disintegrates.

== Notes ==
- Dedication: For my grandmother, Marion Marcus, 1901-2003. With love and thanks for other stories.

== Reviews ==
- John Bailey in The Age noted: "Conte's prose style is unhurried and unforced, rarely indulging in acrobatic feats and only occasionally hinting at the journeyman status sometimes evident in first novels."

== Awards and nominations ==
- 2008 shortlisted Commonwealth Writer's Prize — South East Asia and South Pacific Region - Best First Novel
- 2008 winner Prime Minister's Literary Award — Fiction
