= DANZ Children's Book Award =

Children's book award

The DANZ Children's Book Award (Diversity in Australia and Aotearoa New Zealand Children's Book Award), also known as ASLA DANZ, is an Australian and New Zealand literary award celebrating diversity in children's literature. It was founded in 2024.

== History ==
England-born, Gold Coast-dwelling children's author Kate Foster, who has autism, was concerned that Australia was not keeping up with world trends in publishing children's books featuring diversity (cultural, functional, and gender diversity, Neurodiversity, mental illness) in their characters. The then president of the Australian School Library Association (ASLA), an organisation that supports and advocates for school library staff and students, saw a tweet published by Foster on the topic, and responded immediately. In 2024, the DANZ Children's Book Award was created. The inaugural awards were presented at Somerset Storyfest in Somerset, Queensland, in front of an audience of school children. Lists of books were also printed and distributed to bookshops.

The award was originally conceived as a biennial award focusing on picture books, early chapter books, and middle grade novels, but after there were calls to include other categories, it was moved to an annual event, and in 2025 included awards for young adult, non-fiction, poetry, and graphic novels.

== Description ==
The award recognises and celebrates diversity in children's literature. It is awarded to books published in Australia or New Zealand which "push boundaries, challenge stereotypes, and celebrate diverse and marginalised people and communities", representing diversity such as disability, LGBTQIA people, racial or religious minorities or communities. It is similar to awards in the UK and US like the Jhalak Prize, The Diverse Book Awards, Little Rebels, and The Walter Awards. It is intended to complement these awards rather than compete with them.

Apart from ASLA, the DANZ Award's foundation other major sponsors include the School Library Association of New Zealand Aotearoa (SLANZA), the Copyright Agency's Cultural Fund, Wheelers, the University of Queensland, Informit, and Circon Constructions. Members of the judging panel come from all walks of life.

As of 2026, awards are given in three categories:

- Picture books
- Chapter books
- Middle Grade

== Listings and winners ==
=== 2024 ===
The 2024 winners were:

- Picture Book: Come Over to my House, by Sally Rippin and Eliza Hull, illustrated by Daniel Gray-Barnett
- Chapter Book: Maku, by Meyne Wyatt
- Middle Grade: The Wintrish Girl, by Melanie La'Brooy

=== 2025 ===
The 2025 winners were:

- Young Adult: Catch a Falling Star, by Eileen Merriman
- Graphic Novel: Ghost Book, by Remi Lai
- Non-Fiction: Trees, by Victor Steffensen and Sandra Steffensen
- Poetry: Pasifika Navigators, by 52 Pasifika student authors

=== 2026 ===
The 2026 shortlist was announced on 1 June 2026, and the winners on 27 July. The winners were:

- Picture books: Bapa's Last Canoe, by Maree McCarthy Yoelu, illustrated by Samantha Campbell (Magabala Books)
- Chapter books: Sunny & Shadow, by Helen Milroy (Fremantle Press)
- Middle grade: Wurrtoo, by Tylissa Elisara, illustrated by Dylan Finney (Lothian Children's Books)
