= Remy Lai =

Writer and illustrator of books for children

Remy Lai is an Australian author and illustrator of children's books and middle-grade graphic novels. She was born in Indonesia, grew up in Singapore, and currently lives in Brisbane. Her books tell stories of young Chinese immigrants and Chinese Australians. She writes under the pen name Cecilia Edward for her adult books.

== Awards ==
- 2020 Golden Kite Sid Fleischman Humor Award for Pie in the Sky
- 2020 Golden Kite Honor Book in Young Reader and Middle Grade Fiction for Pie in the Sky
- 2021 Prime Minister's Literary Award for Children's Literature, joint winner for Fly on the Wall
- 2023 Comic Arts Awards of Australia Silver Ledger, joint winner for Rainbow the Koala
- 2024 Victorian Premier's Literary Award for Children's Literature for Ghost Book
- 2024 Comic Arts Awards of Australia Silver Ledger, joint winner for Ghost Book
- 2025 DANZ Children's Book Award for Graphic Novels for Ghost Book
- 2025 APA Book Design Awards, Best Designed Children's Fiction Book for Read At Your Own Risk

== Bibliography ==
- Pie in the Sky (Henry Holt, 2019)
- Fly on the Wall (Henry Holt, 2020)
- Pawcasso (Henry Holt, 2021)
- Surviving the Wild, Volume 1: Star the Elephant (Henry Holt, 2022)
- Surviving the Wild, Volume 2: Rainbow the Koala (Henry Holt, 2022)
- Surviving the Wild, Volume 3: Sunny the Shark
- Ghost Book (Allen & Unwin, 2023)
- Read At Your Own Risk (Allen & Unwin, 2024)
- Chickenpox (Allen & Unwin, 2025)

=== As Cecilia Edward ===
- An Ancient Witch's Guide to Modern Dating (2025)
