= Lisa Gorton =

Australian poet, writer and literary editor

- Born: 1972 (age 53–54)
- Occupations: Poet and novelist
- Writing career
- Language: English
- Years active: 1993-
- Notable work: The Life of Houses
- Notable awards: 2016 Prime Minister's Literary Awards – Fiction

Lisa Gorton (born 1972) is an Australian poet, novelist, literary editor and essayist. She is the author of four award-winning poetry collections: Press Release, Hotel Hyperion, Empirical, and Mirabilia. Her second novel, The Life of Houses, received the NSW Premier's People's Choice Award for Fiction and the Prime Minister's Literary Award for Fiction (shared). Gorton is also the editor of Black Inc's anthology Best Australian Poems 2013.

== Education ==
Gorton was educated at the University of Melbourne and at University of Oxford. At Oxford, as a Rhodes Scholar, Gorton completed an MPhil in Renaissance Literature and a DPhil on John Donne. She received the John Donne Society Award for Outstanding Publication in Donne Studies.

== Career ==
In 1994 she was awarded the inaugural Vincent Buckley Poetry Prize.

Having previously worked as poetry editor for the Australian Book Review, Gorton was selected as ABR Poet of the Month in October 2019. Gorton has contributed essays to the Australian Book Review and the Sydney Review of Books. Since 2021 she has been poetry editor of Island Magazine.

She is the granddaughter of the former Prime Minister John Gorton.

== Writing ==
Gorton's poetry has been widely anthologised, including in The Turnrow Anthology of Contemporary Australian Poetry,The Best Australian Poems series (2008, 2009, 2010, 2011, 2012, 2014, 2015), Contemporary Australian Feminist Poetry, the Anthology of Australian Prose Poetry, the Poetry Magazine May 2016 selection of Australian poetry, edited by Robert Adamson, with photographs by Juno Gemes, and online anthologies Poetry International and lyrikline. Her poetry can also be found online at Cordite magazine.

Gorton's essays have been published in the Sydney Review of Books and Australian Book Review, and in the essay collection Australian Face. Gorton wrote the introductory essay for the Text Classics reissue of Christina Stead's novel The Little Hotel. She also wrote the catalogue essay for Izabela Pluta's artwork Apparent Distance in the 2019 exhibition The National at the Art Gallery of New South Wales.

Gorton is interested in ekphrastic poetry. She has composed a series of poems for Izabela Pluta's artist's book Figures of Slippage and Oscillation. She has also written ekphrastic poems for the catalogue of the 2010 Adelaide Biennial of Contemporary Art Before and After Science, for the exhibition Conversations in Ellipsis, and for the Melbourne Now limited edition volume from the National Gallery of Victoria.

Gorton gave a poetry reading at TEDx Sydney in 2010.

== Awards and recognition ==
Gorton's awards for poetry include the Victorian Premier's Prize for Poetry, the Vincent Buckley Poetry Prize, and the Philip Hodgins Memorial Medal. Her novel The Life of Houses was awarded the New South Wales Premier's People's Choice Award, and the Prime Minister's Fiction Prize.

Her poetry books have also been shortlisted in the Prime Minister's Prize for Poetry, the Mary Gilmore Poetry Prize, the Melbourne Prize for Literature Best Writing Award, and the NSW Premier's Poetry Award.

- 1994 Vincent Buckley Poetry Prize
- 2008 Victorian Premier's Prize for Poetry (then the C. J. Dennis Prize for Poetry) for Press Release
- 2013 Queensland Literary Awards Judith Wright Calanthe Award, shortlisted for Hotel Hyperion
- 2014 Western Australian Premier's Book Award for Poetry, shortlisted for Hotel Hyperion
- 2014 Philip Hodgins Memorial Medal for Excellence in Literature for Hotel Hyperion
- 2016 Prime Minister's Literary Award for Fiction, joint winner for The Life of Houses
- 2016 New South Wales Premier's Literary Awards People's Choice Award for The Life of Houses
- 2020 Kenneth Slessor Prize for Poetry, shortlisted for Empirical
- 2022 Wesley Michel Wright Prize
- 2023 Kenneth Slessor Prize for Poetry, shortlisted for Miribilia

== Critical response ==
On Empirical

Jessica Wilkinson, poet and editor of Rabbit magazine, interviewed Gorton about her poetry collection Empirical, noting Lisa's interest in "how a feeling for place originates". In the Sydney Review of Books, poet and critic Michael Farrell suggests that Gorton's poetry collection Empirical offers "models of 3D thought", remarking that "Gorton reanimates - and translates - historical textual materials into contemporary poetry", and that her work "performs as an antidote to nationalist ideology". In The Sydney Morning Herald, James Antoniou writes: "an important voice is breaking through here: assured, polyphonic and, for all its quietness, visionary".

On The Life of Houses

In the Sydney Review of Books, Kerryn Goldsworthy writes about Gorton's debut novel The Life of Houses: "One of the main reasons for Gorton's status as a highly respected, prize-winning Australian poet is her unique and personal angle of vision on the world. It's something that, as Auden surmises, cannot be taught…For Gorton it seems not so much a matter of finding le mot juste as of making something entirely new: not merely choosing the word or naming the non-verbal thing it represents, but of using metaphor to create a new and separate third entity in which a word or phrase brings an inchoate, intangible feeling, sensation or memory out of the shadows and into the sunlight of consciousness."

== Works ==
=== Poetry ===
Individual poems have been published in HEAT, Poetry, The Best Australian Poems 2008, The Best Australian Poems 2009, The Best Australian Poems 2010, and The Best Australian Poems 2012.

- —— (2007). Press Release. Giramondo. ISBN 9781920882341.
- —— (2012). Hotel Hyperion. Giramondo. ISBN 9781922146274.
- —— (2019). Empirical. Giramondo. ISBN 9781925818116.
- —— (2022). Miribilia. Giramondo. ISBN 9781922725301.

=== Novels ===
- —— (2008). Cloudland. Pan Macmillan Australia. ISBN 9781741982725.
- —— (2015). The Life of Houses. Giramondo. ISBN 9781922146809.

=== Edited ===
- ——, ed. (2013). The Best Australia Poems 2013. Collingwood: Black Inc. ISBN 9781863956277. OCLC 867108727.
