= Imre Salusinszky =

Australian journalist

Imre Salusinszky (born 1955) is an Australian journalist, political adviser and English literature academic. As of 2020, he was media adviser to former Australian Government Minister Paul Fletcher.

== Background and career ==
Born in Budapest, Salusinszky and his family came to Australia as refugees following the 1956 Hungarian uprising. He was educated at Melbourne High School, the University of Melbourne, and the University of Oxford, where he completed a DPhil in English literature. He lectured at Yale University and at the University of Melbourne, prior to taking up tenure as an associate professor in the English Department at the University of Newcastle. He started writing for The Australian Financial Review in 1994, and featured for several years on the Coodabeen Champions, on ABC Radio, as well as on Life Matters.

He was an editorial advisor for Quadrant, a political reporter and columnist for The Australian, and wrote for the Sydney Morning Herald and Sun-Herald. In 2006, he was appointed Chairman of the Literature Board of the Australia Council for a three-year term. Penguin publishing director Bob Sessions praised his appointment: "I think it's terrific," he said. "Fresh blood with a good knowledge of the industry." However, former Australia Council Chair, Hilary McPhee, criticised it as right-wing political bias. Salusinszky served as media adviser for former Premier of New South Wales, Mike Baird, from 2013 and 2017.

In 2019 Salusinsky published, The Hilton Bombing: Evan Pederick and the Ananda Marga, which denied the existence of evidence of a conspiracy and provided evidence that Pederick was responsible for the Sydney Hilton Bombing. It was shortlisted for the 2020 Nib Literary Award. In 2023, he was a visiting scholar at the ELTE School of English and American Studies.

== Bibliography ==
- Salusinszky, Imre (1987). Criticism in society : interviews with Jacques Derrida, Northrop Frye, Harold Bloom, Geoffrey Hartman, Frank Kermode, Edward Said, Barbara Johnson, Frank Lentricchia and J. Hillis Miller. London: Methuen.
- Gerald Murnane, Oxford University Press, 1993, ISBN 0-19-553422-0
- Davies, J. M. Q., ed. (1994), "Deconstruction in the Classroom: Jane Austen's Persuasion", Bridging the gap: literary theory in the classroom, Locust Hill Press, ISBN 0-933951-60-4
- Salusinszky, Imre (October 1995). "Thomas Keneally : my part in his downfall". Quadrant. 39 (10): 23–26.
- "Visionary Frye". Canadian Review of Comparative Literature/Revue Canadienne de Littérature Comparée. vol. 23 no. 2. June 1996. pp. 590–593. ISSN 0319-051X.
- (editor) (1999) [1997], The Oxford book of Australian essays, Oxford University Press, ISBN 0-19-553739-4
- co-authored with Boyd, David (c. 1999), Rereading Frye: the published and unpublished works, University of Toronto Press, ISBN 0-8020-4252-X
- Womack, Kenneth; et al., eds. (2002), "Northrop Frye (1912–1991)", The Continuum encyclopedia of modern criticism and theory, Continuum, ISBN 0-8264-1414-1
- co-edited with Melleuish, Gregory (2002), Blaming ourselves: September 11 and the agony of the left, Duffy & Snellgrove, ISBN 1-876631-37-6
- (editor) (c. 2005), Northrop Frye's writings on the eighteenth and nineteenth centuries, University of Toronto Press, ISBN 0-8020-3824-7
- Donaldson, Jeffery; Mendelson, Alan, eds. (2004), "In the Climates of the Mind': Frye's Career as a Spiral Curriculum", Frye and the word: religious contexts in the writings of Northrop Frye, University of Toronto Press, pp. 43–58, ISBN 0-8020-8813-9
- Salusinszky, Imre (2019). The Hilton Bombing: Evan Pederick and the Ananda Marga. Melbourne, Australia: Melbourne University Press. ISBN 9780522875492.
