= Red Heaven (novel) =

2021 novel by Australian author Nicolas Rothwell

- Author: Nicolas Rothwell
- Language: English
- Genre: Novel
- Publisher: Text Publishing
- Publication date: 3 August 2021
- Publication place: Australia
- Media type: Print
- Pages: 378 pp.
- Awards: 2022 Prime Minister's Literary Awards — Fiction, winner
- ISBN: 9781922458049

Red Heaven is a 2021 novel by the Australian author Nicolas Rothwell.

It was the winner of the 2022 Prime Minister's Literary Awards for Fiction.

== Synopsis ==
The unnamed boy at the centre of this novel is raised by two aunts in Europe: Serghiana, who is the daughter of a Soviet general in the communist regime who goes on to work as a film producer in California; Madame Ady, who is a fashionable Viennese woman married to a famous conductor. How these two conflicting aunts try to influence the boy will have a profound effect on him for the rest of his life.

== Notes ==
- Dedication: 'In memory of NS, brother spirit'
- Epigraph: "The morning cometh, and also the night: if ye will inquire, inquire ye: return, come."

== Critical reception ==
In Australian Book Review reviewer Paul Giles noted: "Abjuring the idea of the novel as a mere social construction, Red Heaven attempts instead to resuscitate ‘ghosts’ buried deep within the narrator’s psyche." The reviewer concluded that the novel "is a work of genuine intellectual exploration, original and provocative on its own hermetic terms."

== Awards ==
- 2022 Prime Minister's Literary Awards for Fiction, winner
- 2022 Queensland Literary Awards — The Courier-Mail People's Choice Queensland Book of the Year, shortlisted

== See also ==
- 2021 in Australian literature
