= Golds (surname) =

Golds is an English surname. Notable people with the surname include:

- Cassandra Golds (born 1962), Australian writer
- Shannon Golds (born 1986), Australian tennis player
- Tim Golds (born 1993), Australian rules footballer
