= Border Districts =

2017 novel by Australian author Gerald Murnane

- Author: Gerald Murnane
- Language: English
- Genre: Novel
- Publisher: Giramondo Publishing
- Publication date: 1 November 2017
- Publication place: Australia
- Media type: Print
- Pages: 164 pp.
- Awards: 2018 Prime Minister's Literary Awards — Fiction, winner
- ISBN: 9781925336542

Border Districts is a 2017 novel by the Australian author Gerald Murnane.

It was the winner of the 2018 Prime Minister's Literary Awards for Fiction.

== Synopsis ==
The novel's narrator has moved from a large city to a small rural town in the border country of Victoria and South Australia. He intends to live out his days there and as he walks around the town he looks back over his life and the memories that persist, and examines the life he lives on the borderlands of life and death.

== Critical reception ==
In Australian Book Review reviewer Beejay Silcox noted that Murnane's work "can seem bloodless and cerebral, overly complex and obscure", but fans of his work "are drawn in by Murnane's dispassionate contemplation, and his willingness to inhabit the borderlands between conjecture and reality, memory and imagination, writer and written, life and death, love-letter and elegy". They concluded that this novel is "sublime writing."

== Awards ==
- 2018 ALS Gold Medal, shortlisted
- 2018 Miles Franklin Award, shortlisted
- 2018 Prime Minister's Literary Awards for Fiction, winner
- 2019 New South Wales Premier's Literary Awards — Christina Stead Prize for Fiction, shortlisted

== See also ==
- 2017 in Australian literature
