= Melinda Smith =

Australian poet

Melinda Smith (born 1971) is an Australian poet.

Smith won the poetry section of the Prime Minister's Literary Awards in 2014 for her collection Drag Down to Unlock or Place an Emergency Call. The award citation said, "From its range of technique and tone to its depth of ideas, imagery and emotion, this collection announces the arrival of a major new poet."

She was the Poetry Editor of The Canberra Times between June 2015 and June 2017.

Smith lives in Canberra, Australia. She has two adult sons, one of whom was diagnosed as a child with autism. This was the principal subject of her collection First...Then... : Poems from Planet Autism.

== Poetry collections ==
- Pushing Thirty, Wearing Seventeen (Ginninderra Press, 2001)
- Mapless in Underland (Ginninderra Press, 2004)
- First... Then... : Poems from Planet Autism (Ginninderra Press, 2012)
- Drag Down to Unlock or Place an Emergency Call (Pitt Street Poetry, 2013)
- Goodbye, Cruel (Pitt Street Poetry, 2017)
- 1962: Be Spoken To (collaboration with artist Caren Florance) (Limited edition artist's book, 2015–2017)
- Members Only (collaboration with artist Caren Florance) (Recent Work Press, 2017)
- Listen, bitch (collaboration with artist Caren Florance) (Recent Work Press, 2019)
- Perfectly Bruised (bilingual English and Mandarin selected poems, translated by Bei Bei Chen and Karen Kun) (Flying Islands Press, 2019)
- Man-handled (Recent Work Press, 2020)
