= Steven Conte =

Australian critic and novelist

- Born: 1966 (age 59–60); Sydney, New South Wales
- Writing career
- Language: English
- Years active: 1992-present
- Notable works: The Zookeeper's War, "The Tolstoy Estate"
- Notable awards: Prime Minister's Literary Award
- Website: www.stevenconte.com

Steven Conte (born 1966) is an Australian novelist who won the inaugural Prime Minister's Literary Award for Fiction in 2008 for his novel The Zookeeper's War. His fiction has been published in Australia, New Zealand, the UK and Ireland, as well as in translation in Spain, Italy, Germany and the Netherlands.

== Early life ==
Steven Conte was born in Sydney and raised in the town of Guyra in New South Wales. He was educated at The Armidale School (TAS) in Armidale, New South Wales, and at the University of Canberra. In 1993 he completed a Masters degree in Australian Literature as a civilian at the Australian Defence Force Academy (University of NSW, Canberra). He also holds a PhD in Creative Writing from the University of Melbourne.

== Personal life ==
Conte lives in the town of Koroit in south-west Victoria. He is the parent of a son with non-verbal autism.

== Bibliography ==
=== Novels ===
- The Zookeeper's War (2007)
- The Tolstoy Estate (2020)

== Awards ==
- 2008 shortlisted Commonwealth Writers Prize South East Asia and South Pacific Region — Best First Book — The Zookeeper's War
- 2008 winner Prime Minister's Literary Awards — Fiction — The Zookeeper's War
- 2021 shortlisted Walter Scott Prize — The Tolstoy Estate
