= Briony Stewart =

Australian author and illustrator

- Born: Subiaco, Western Australia
- Occupations: Author and illustrator
- Years active: 2007–present
- Children: 2
- Website: http://www.brionystewart.com

Briony Stewart is an Australian writer and illustrator of children's books.

== Career ==
Stewart's first book Kumiko and the Dragon was published by University of Queensland Press after winning the inaugural Voices on the Coast Youth Literature Festival writing award. Inspired by Stewart's Japanese grandmother, Kumiko and the Dragon won the Aurealis Award for Best Children's Short Fiction, and was listed as a Notable book by the Children's Book Council of Australia in 2008. Two sequels, Kumiko and the Dragon's Secret (released in 2010) and Kumiko and the Shadow Catchers (released in 2011) completed the series as a trilogy. Both books continue Kumiko's fantasy adventure, with similar references to folktale and Japanese mythology. In 2012 Stewart's book Kumiko and the Shadow Catchers won the Queensland Literary Awards Children's Book category.

Stewart's first picture book, The Red Wheelbarrow was published by University of Queensland Press in 2012. A wordless picture book inspired by the famous poem by William Carlos Williams, celebrating the beauty in small everyday moments. The book was shortlisted in the Australian Speech Pathology, Book of the Year Awards, was a CBCA notable book, and in 2015 was selected by the International Board of Books for Young People (IBBY) to be part of its international silent books project, a travelling exhibition which was launched in June 2015 in Rome at the Palazzo delle Esposizioni.

Stewart published a second picture book in 2014 entitled Here in the Garden, a gentle book about loss and grief and acceptance as experienced by a child. Since the birth of her children in 2015 and 2017, Stewart has collaborated as illustrator on a number of different titles including a series of three picture books written by Australian Comedian Jimmy Rees.

As a solo creator, Stewart wrote and illustrated two picture books about a cheeky dog named Magoo, the first of which, We Love You Magoo won the 2021 Honour Book prize from the Children’s Book Council of Australia.

Briony Stewart also made Accidentally Kelly Street a picture book adaptation of the 1993 song ‘Accidently Kelly Street’ by Melbourne music group Frente! The book uses the lyrics of the song as written by the group’s bassist, Tim O’Connor. The book has been praised by lead singer Angie Heart, as well as Myf Warhurst and Zan Rowe.

In 2022 Briony Stewart and author Sherryl Clark jointly won the Prime Ministers Literary Award children’s literature category, for their junior fiction verse-novel Mina and the Whole Wide World.

Stewart won the 2024 Children's Book of the Year Award: Early Childhood for her picture book Gymnastica Fantastica!. The judges called it a "vibrant picture book [that] conveys so much energy and life which children will connect with immediately".

Stewart's next picture book, Everything You Ever Wanted to Know About the Tooth Fairy (and Some Things You Didn't) was shortlisted for the Children's Book of the Year Award: Early Childhood and for the Prime Minister's Literary Award for Children's literature in 2025.

Stewart produced the official art for the Children's Book Council of Australia's 2026 Children's Book Week celebrations.

== Bibliography ==
=== As author and illustrator ===
- Kumiko and the Dragon (UQP, 2007) - Notable book in the Children's Book of the Year Award: Younger Readers in 2008; Aurealis Award winner for Children's short fiction
- Kumiko and the Dragon's Secret (UQP, 2010)
- Kumiko and the Shadow Catchers (UQP, 2011) - Notable Book in the Children's Book of the Year Award: Younger Readers in 2012; Queensland Literary Award winner for Children's books
- The Red Wheelbarrow (UQP, 2012) - Notable Book for the Children's Book of the Year Award: Early Childhood in 2013
- Here in the Garden (UQP, 2014)
- We Love You Magoo (Puffin, 2020) - Honour Book Award for the Children's Book of the Year Award: Early Childhood in 2021
- Where Are You Magoo (Puffin, 2021)
- Gymnastica Fantastica! (Hachette, 2023) - Winner of the Children's Book of the Year Award: Early Childhood in 2024
- Everything You Ever Wanted to Know About the Tooth Fairy (and Some Things You Didn't) (Lothian, 2024) - Shortlisted for the Children's Book of the Year Award: Early Childhood and for the Prime Minister's Literary Award for Children's literature in 2025
- The Bestest Brown (Lothian, 2026)

=== As illustrator ===
- Kelsey and the Quest of The Porcelain Doll (UQP, 2014)
- The Lion in Our Living Room (Affirm Press, 2017)
- Jehan and the Quest of the Lost Dog (UQP, 2021)
- The Bear in Our Backyard (Affirm Press, 2018)
- Nullabaoo Hullaballoo (Puffin - Penguin Random House, 2019)
- Trouble in the Surf (National Library of Australia Publishing, 2019) - Notable Book in the Children's Book of the Year Award: Eve Pownall Award for Information Books in 2020
- Bedtime Sorted (Affirm Press, 2021)
- Mina and the Whole Wide World (UQP, 2021) - Notable Book in the Children's Book of the Year Award: Younger Readers in 2022; Prime Minister's Literary Award winner
- Fozia and the Quest of Prince Zal (UQP, 2021)
- Dinner Sorted (Affirm Press, 2022)
- Accidentally Kelly Street (Affirm Press, 2022)
- Holiday Sorted (Affirm Press, 2023)
- The Garden At the End of the World (UQP, 2023)
- Right Way Down (Fremantle Press, 2024)
- Courage Be My Friend: The Vivian Bullwinkel Story (Fremantle Press, 2024)
- Father of the Lost Boys: The Mecak Ajang Alaak Story (2nd edition, Fremantle Press, 2024)
- Goldfields Girl: The Clara Saunders Story (2nd edition, Fremantle Press, 2025)
- Soaring With the Sugarbird Lady: The Robin Miller Story (Fremantle Press, 2025)
- The Thing About Christmas (Little Book Press, 2025) - Notable Book in the Children's Book of the Year Award: Early Childhood and the Children's Book of the Year Award: Picture Book in 2026
- If I Could Eat The Stars (Fremantle Press, 2026)
