= Ross McMullin =

Australian historian (born 1952)

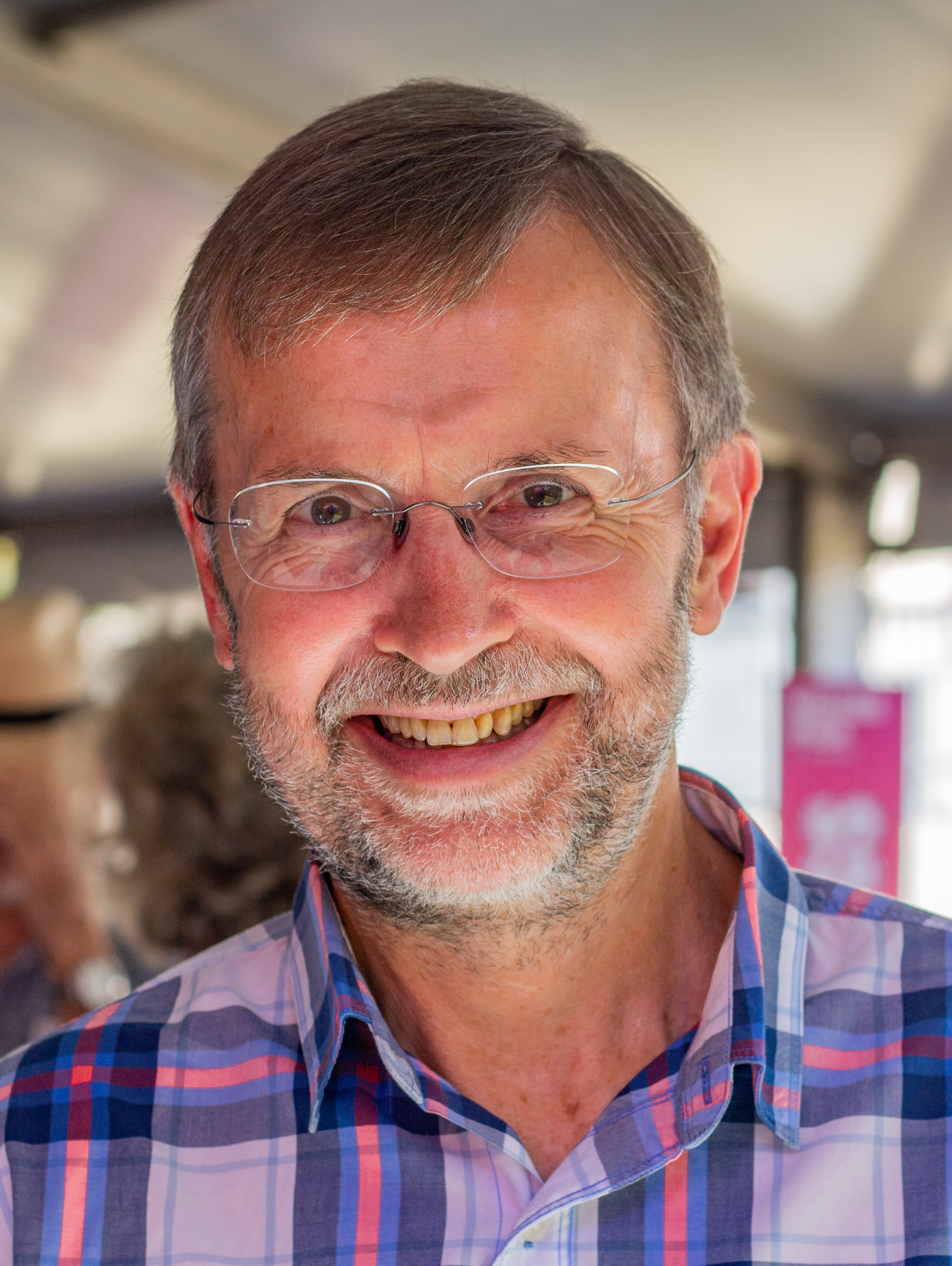
- McMullin at Perth Festival Writers Week in 2019
- Education: University of Melbourne
- Occupation: Historian

Ross McMullin is an Australian historian who has written a number of books on political and social history, as well as several biographies.

== Early life and education ==
McMullin was educated at the University of Melbourne, where he wrote his Master of Arts thesis on the 1913 federal election and his doctoral thesis on the cartoonist Will Dyson.

== Writing career ==
McMullin wrote a biography of Dyson, Will Dyson: Australia's Radical Genius, that was shortlisted for the 2007 National Biography Award, and was one of three books to be cited as "highly commended" by the judging panel.

McMullin has written several entries in the Australian Dictionary of Biography. He was commissioned to write the official history of the Australian Labor Party to coincide with the 100th anniversary of its founding. It was published in 1991 as The Light on the Hill, with the title taken from Ben Chifley's speech of the same name. He later published So Monstrous a Travesty, a book about the Watson government, to coincide with its 100th anniversary in 2004.

In 2002, McMullin published Pompey Elliott, a biography of the First World War general Harold Elliott. It won the Melbourne University Press Award for Literature and the Fellowship of Australian Writers Christina Stead Award. In 2018, he published a second book on Elliott, titled Pompey Elliott at War, which focused on his speeches and writing during the war.

McMullin's book Farewell, Dear People – a collection of World War I biographies – won the 2013 Prime Minister's Prize for Australian History, including prize money of A$75,000. In 2016, The Sydney Morning Herald reported that Prime Minister Kevin Rudd had personally overruled the judging panel (which had chosen another book) to award the prize to McMullin.

== Selected works ==
- The Light on the Hill: The Australian Labor Party 1891–1991 (1991)
- Pompey Elliott (2002)
- So Monstrous a Travesty: Chris Watson and the World's First National Labour Government (2004)
- Will Dyson: Australia's Radical Genius (2006)
- Farewell, Dear People: Biographies of Australia's Lost Generation (2013)
- Pompey Elliott At War: In His Own Words (2018)
- Life So Full of Promise: Further Biographies of Australia's Lost Generation (2023)
