= My Life as a Traitor =

2007 biography and memoir by Zarah Ghahramani and Robert Hillma

- Author: Zarah Ghahramani, Robert Hillman
- Language: English
- Genre: Biography/Memoir
- Publisher: Farrar, Straus and Giroux
- Publication date: December 2007
- Pages: 256
- ISBN: 1-921215-50-X
- OCLC: 174097684

My Life as a Traitor is a 2007 biography and memoir, written by Zarah Ghahramani and Robert Hillman. The book documents the life of Ghahramani, including her early childhood. In 2001, Ghahramani was arrested for citing crimes against the Islamic Republic of Iran and sent to serve a sentence in Evin Prison; this is one of the main focuses throughout the book, as well as the prison conditions and analysing the modern-world Middle East. The book was first published on December 26, 2006 by Farrar, Straus and Giroux. The book won the award for Australian Small Publisher of the Year for 2006.

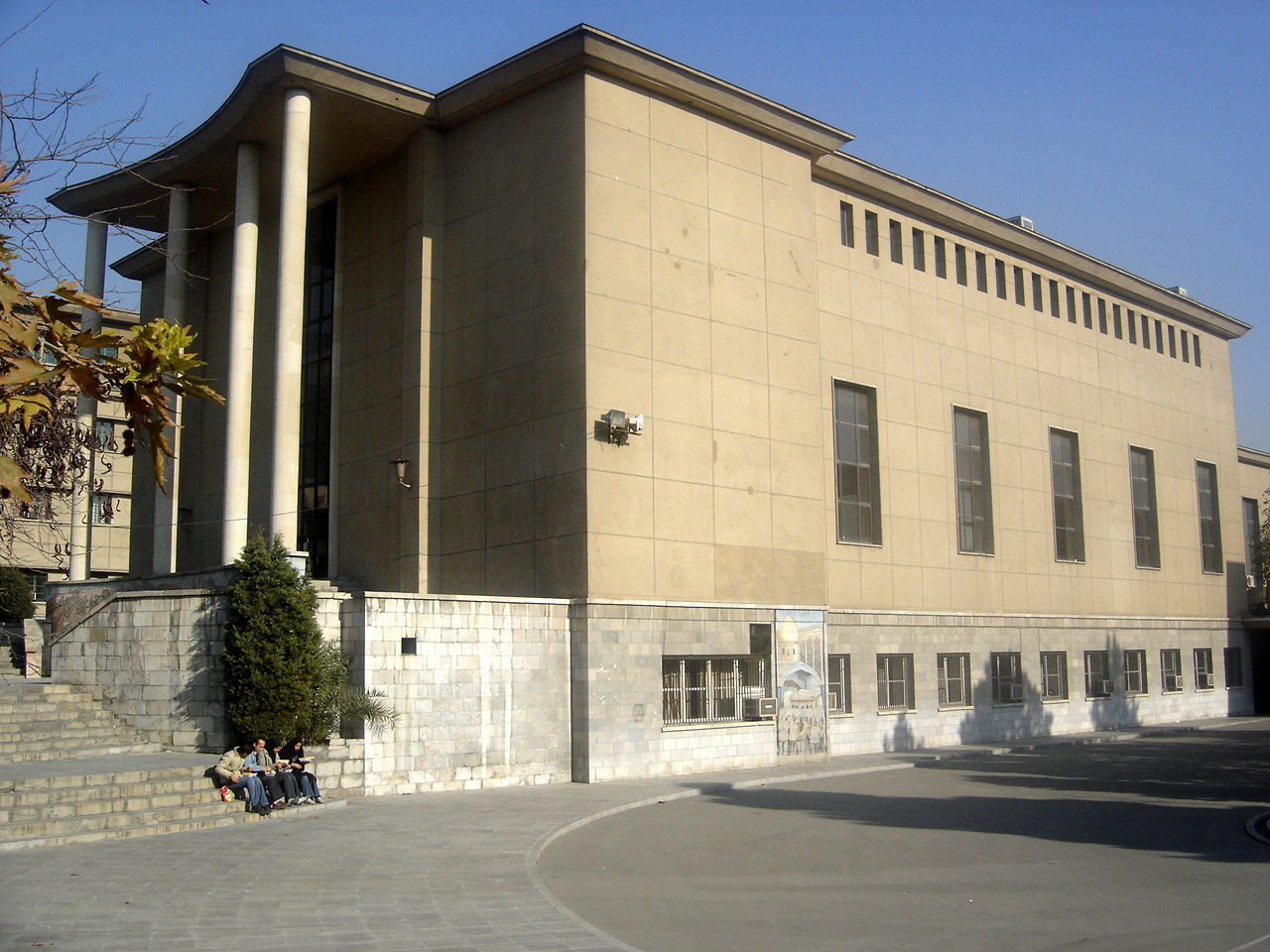
The University of Tehran, where Ghahramani took part in protests

== Plot ==
The biography focuses on analysing the life of the author, Zarah Ghahramani and her imprisonment in the infamous Evin Prison. After taking part in student demonstrations at Tehran University, Ghahramani was taken, by police, from the streets of Tehran and put into this prison, where she was tortured and beaten. When in prison, she was subject to not only beatings, but psychological torture, only retaining her sanity via scratching messages to fellow prisoners. She is kept in the prison for almost one month, and is released after being driven to a distant desert outside of Tehran, where, at the time, she was unsure of her fate and whether or not she would be executed or released.

== Reception ==
Lisa Schwarzbaum of Entertainment Weekly commented that "she [Ghahramani] recounts her beatings with dignified anger in this vivid, sometimes horrifying memoir, My Life as a Traitor mixing scenes from prison with sensual memories of her life before what her father called the regime of the primitives." Firoozeh Dumas comments that the book is "a compelling story...a must read for anyone interested in understanding the complex nation that is Iran." The Sunday Telegraph wrote that the book is "Beautifully written, it's horrifying, enlightening and, ultimately, uplifting." The book was shortlisted for the 2008 Prime Minister's Literary Awards.
