= Anam (novel) =

2023 novel by Australian author André Dao

- Author: André Dao
- Language: English
- Genre: Literary novel
- Publisher: Hamish Hamilton
- Publication date: May 2023
- Publication place: Australia
- Media type: Print
- Pages: 368 pp.
- Awards: 2024 Prime Minister's Literary Awards for Fiction, winner
- ISBN: 9781761046940

Anam is a 2023 debut novel by the Australian author André Dao.

It was the winner of the 2024 Prime Minister's Literary Awards for Fiction.

== Synopsis ==
The novel is based on the life of the author's grandfather who was imprisoned in Vietnam for 10 years by the Communist regime for being a Catholic intellectual. While writing his grandfather's story Dao is also studying in Cambridge U.K. for a master's degree in law and living with his wife and daughter.

The novel covers a time period from the 1930s to the present day, and from Vietnam, to England and Australia.

== Critical reception ==
Scott McCulloch, writing for Australian Book Review, notes that the novel "deals in the inconsistencies of memory and perception" which goes on "to create a sprawling meditation on how remembrance is carried and lived intergenerationally, between countries and displacements, between the living and the dead." He concluded: "Dao collates threads and traces that comprise, as in nature, a laboratory of life. His treatment of place fields an elliptical and coherent storytelling, entangled as such to explore the fictional nature of belonging."

In The Guardian Joseph Cummins called the novel "a deeply personal meditation on family memory", and while "it takes the reader on a wild and at times bewildering ride, it is equally a warm, tender book about family."

== See also ==
- 2023 in Australian literature

== Notes ==
- Dedication: For Ong Ba Noi

== Awards ==
- 2024 Prime Minister's Literary Awards for Fiction, winner
- 2024 Miles Franklin Award, shortlisted
- 2024 New South Wales Premier's Literary Awards — UTS Glenda Adams Award for New Writing, winner
- 2024 Voss Literary Prize, shortlisted
