= Nicolas Rothwell =

Australian journalist (born 1960)

Nicolas Rothwell (born 1960) is a journalist and the Northern Australia correspondent for The Australian newspaper. He is also a writer with two novels and several works of non-fiction to his name.

== Background ==
Rothwell is the child of a Czech mother, Anna, and an Australian father, Bruce, a journalist from Melbourne. They had met in Berlin, and then moved to New York City where Rothwell was born in 1960 in Manhattan. Rothwell attended boarding school in Switzerland, and read Latin and Greek at Oxford. In the 1980s and early 1990s he was a foreign correspondent for The Australian and reported from the Americas, the Pacific and Western and Eastern Europe, latterly during the Yugoslav conflict. Burned out by the latter upheaval, in the 1990s he sought out a posting in Australia, again for The Australian newspaper. As of 2022, he was based in Far North Queensland. His partner is indigenous activist and politician Alison Anderson.

== Journalism ==
The majority of Rothwell's articles can be found in The Australian newspaper. Some of the best are collected in his book Another Country (2007). He won a Walkley Award in 2006 for his journalistic coverage of Indigenous affairs.

In 2009, Rothwell welcomed efforts by Indigenous Affairs Minister Jenny Macklin to reshape the government's intervention in the Northern Territory, noting that alcohol and pornography bans and an income-management regime showed improvement in regional communities, albeit accompanied by a relocation of anti-social behaviour to the Territory's main towns. He joined Noel Pearson in deploring the "rotting effects of passive welfare provision" to Aboriginal Australians and in urging the extension of work-for-welfare programs.

== Publications ==
Aside from the novels Heaven and Earth (2009) and Red Heaven (2022), Rothwell's books are listed as non-fiction, but always highly personalized and offering romantic accounts of northern Australia. He combines copious literary references with personal observations.

Wings of the Kite-Hawk (2003) was widely praised for its accounts of the eccentric people and timeless landscapes of the region, as he followed the footsteps of explorers Leichhardt, Sturt, Giles and Strehlow. Another Country (2007) is a compilation of Rothwell's journalism, consisting of shorter accounts of meeting "mystics and artists, explorers and healers". It was deemed to have been finely written but sometimes detached in style. Journeys to the Interior is about "death, friendship, travel and art".

In The Red Highway, Rothwell evokes his own path, when he says "people who come to northern Australia come here because they're lost, or searching, or on the edge of life, and silence, and they're chasing after some kind of pattern, some redemption they think might be lurking, on the line of the horizon, out in the faint, receding perspectives of the bush". The Red Highway is a "sandy, dusty realm", a landscape which has an "interwoven, interconnected quality: a musical aspect – a repetition, and variation: the way the light filtering through the stringy-barks echoes, and speaks to the changes in the landforms; the way shape and pattern are multiplied at different levels, so that the branching arms of a river delta seem like the veins of a leaf ..."

=== Books ===
- Rothwell, N. 1999. Heaven and Earth. Duffy & Snellgrove Publishers.
- —— 2003. Wings of the Kite Hawk. Sydney: Picador. Reprinted Black Inc. 2009
- —— 2007. Another Country. Melbourne: Black Inc.
- —— 2009. The Red Highway. Melbourne: Black Inc.
- —— 2010. Journeys to the Interior. Melbourne: Black Inc.
- —— 2013. Belomor. Melbourne: Text Publishing.
- —— 2016. Quicksilver. Melbourne: Text Publishing.
- —— 2021. Red Heaven. Melbourne: Text Publishing.
- with Alison Nampitjinpa Anderson (2025). Yilkari: A Desert Suite. Text Publishing. ISBN 9781923058422.

=== Articles ===
- Rothwell, N. 2008. "Travels in the Northern realm: the idea of the North", The Monthly
- —— 2008. "Indigenous insiders chart an end to victimhood", The Australian. (refers to Marcia Langton and Noel Pearson). Australian Literary Review, September 2008
- "Our Fourth World". The Australian. 30 May 2009. Archived from the original on 9 March 2011.
- —— 2009. "Into the Red: Haydn in the Outback", The Monthly

=== Audio ===
- "The Landscape Behind the Landscape" – 2014 Eric Rolls Memorial Lecture

== Awards and recognition ==
- Winner, Prime Minister's Literary Award for fiction 2022 for Red Heaven
