= The Cyprian =

2023 poetry collection by Amy Crutchfield

- Author: Amy Crutchfield
- Language: English
- Genre: Poetry collection
- Publisher: Giramondo Publishing
- Publication date: September 2023
- Publication place: Australia
- Media type: Print
- Pages: 80 pp.
- Awards: 2024 Prime Minister's Literary Awards — Poetry, winner
- ISBN: 9781922725776

The Cyprian is the debut collection of poetry by Australian author Amy Crutchfield, published by Giramondo Publishing, in 2023.

The collection contains 30 poems from a variety of sources. It was the winner of the 2024 Prime Minister's Literary Awards — Poetry.

== Contents ==
- "Egg"
- "He Rises"
- "Pothos II"
- "Pothos III"
- "Dora and the Minotaur 1936 – Ink, Pencil and Scratching on Paper"
- "Camera Obscura"
- "The Memory of Water"
- "Helens of Troy"
- "Moon Cocoon"
- "Pumpkin"
- "Yew"
- "A Clean House"
- "Market Day"
- "MH17"
- "Nothing is Past"
- "True in the Senses"
- "Alyki"
- "A Party on the Coast"
- "Beautiful Corpse"
- "Half-Life"
- "The Last Sense"
- "Young Women in the Garden, Bonnard (1921-23/1945-46)"
- "Young Women in the Garden II/The Colour of Escape"
- "Paper Lantern"
- "Skoliosi"
- "Undo"
- "Child Receding"
- "Welcome to the Future of Custom Lightsabers"
- "Ob."
- "A Narrow Field"

== Critical reception ==
In a review of all of the 2024 Prime Minister's Award winners Alexander Howard, writing for The Conversation website, noted: "The poems in The Cyprian wear their learning lightly. Intimate, honest and lyrical, they move inexorably 'towards love's borders, lawless places, and across those borders, to situations where love fails us, or we fail love'. Crutchfield, like many of the 2024 winners, does interesting things with literary form."

The judges of the Prime Minister's Awards said of the work: "Amy Crutchfield’s The Cyprian reappraises the figure of Aphrodite—Greek goddess of beauty, lust, love, procreation and passion—from a contemporary vantage point, finding in Aphrodite a capacious and complex avatar for love and its violent destruction across time. Crutchfield's lines are almost aphoristic in their concision yet see through to worlds magnitudes larger, and her voice arrives fully-fledged, and entirely in command."

== Awards ==
- 2024 Prime Minister's Literary Awards — Poetry, winner

== See also ==
- 2023 in Australian literature
