= Paddy O'Reilly (writer) =

Australian writer

Paddy O'Reilly is an Australian writer. Her first major short story prize was the Age Short Story Award in 2002 for her story, "Snapshots of Strangers". She was an Asialink resident to Japan in 1997 and has also won residencies at the Vermont Studio Center, Varuna, The Writers' House, Bundanon Trust, Katharine Susannah Prichard Writers' Centre and the Newcastle Lockup, among others. She has won the Norma K Hemming Award and been shortlisted for the ALS Gold Medal, the Queensland Premier's Literary Awards and the Prime Minister's Literary Awards. Her novels and stories have been published and broadcast in Australia and New Zealand, China, the Caribbean, Europe, the United Kingdom and the United States. Heart of Pearl, a short film for which she wrote the screenplay, was nominated for an Australian Film Institute award.

== Bibliography ==
- 2005 (Novel) The Factory, Thompson Walker, Melbourne, republished 2015 by Affirm Press, Melbourne
- 2007 (Story Collection) The End of the World, U.Q.P., St Lucia
- 2007 (Novella) "Deep Water" in Love and Desire, ed. Cate Kennedy, Five Mile Press, Rowville
- 2012 (Novel) The Fine Colour of Rust, Blue Door HarperCollins, London; Atria Simon and Schuster, New York (writing as P. A. O'Reilly)
- 2014 (Novel) The Wonders, Affirm Press, Melbourne; Atria Simon and Schuster, New York
- 2015 (Story Collection) Peripheral Vision, U.Q.P., St Lucia
- 2022 (Novel) Other Houses, Affirm Press, Melbourne
