= Frances Watts =

Australian writer

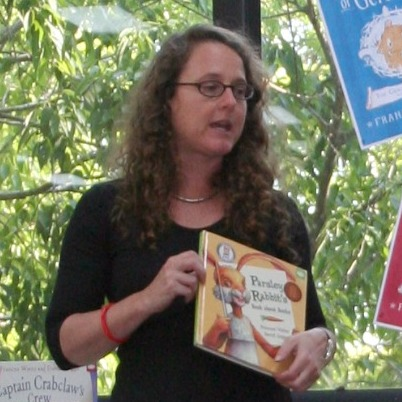
- Frances Watts in 2011
- Born: Ali Lavau Switzerland
- Occupation: Author
- Education: Macquarie University
- Genre: Children's literature
- Notable works: Goodnight, Mice! Parsley Rabbit's Book about Books; My Friend Fred
- Notable awards: CBCA Book of the Year Awards; Prime Minister's Literary Award for Children's Fiction

Frances Watts is the pen-name of Ali Lavau, a Swiss born Australian author, who moved to Sydney, Australia when she was three years old. She has studied English literature at Macquarie University, going on to teach Australian Literature and children's literature. After graduating with a PhD, she obtained her first job in publishing.

== Awards and honours ==
- 2006 CBCA Book of the Year Awards in the Early Childhood category, Honour book:Kisses For Daddy
- 2008 CBCA Book of the Year Awards, Winner: Parsley Rabbit's Book about Books
- 2012 CBCA Book of the Year Awards, Notable Book: Goodnight, Mice!
- 2012 Prime Minister's Literary Awards Children's Fiction Winner: Goodnight, Mice!
- 2020 CBCA Book of the Year Awards in the Early Childhood category, Winner: My Friend Fred
- 2020 Aurealis Award for best children's fiction, Shortlisted: The Chicken's Curse

== Books ==
=== Fiction ===
- Extraordinary Ernie & Marvellous Maud (illus. Judy Watson) (2008)
- The Greatest Sheep in History (illus. Judy Watson) (2009)
- The Raven's Wing (2014)
- The Peony Lantern (2015)
- The Chicken's Curse (2020)

=== Picture books ===
- This Dog Bruce (2004)
- Kisses for Daddy (illus. David Legge) (2005)
- Parsley Rabbit's Book about Books (2007)
- Captain Crabclaw's Crew (2009)
- A Rat in a Stripy Sock (illus. David Francis) (2010)
- Goodnight, Mice! (illus. Judy Watson) (2011)
- The Fearsome, Frightening, Ferocious Box (illus. David Legge) (2013)
- A Very Quacky Christmas (illus. Ann James) (2017)
- It's a Story, Rory! (illus. David Legge) (2018)
- Leonard Doesn't Dance (illus. Judy Watson) (2019)
- My Friend Fred (illus. Anne Yi) (2019)
