= Alison Whittaker =

Aboriginal Australian poet and academic

Alison Whittaker is an Aboriginal Australian poet and academic of the Gomeroi people. She is a senior researcher at the University of Technology Sydney.

== Early life and education ==
Alison Whittaker's mother is Gomeroi and her father a non-Indigenous Australian. She grew up on the floodplains of Gunnedah, near the Namoi River in New South Wales.

She has a combined Bachelor of Arts in writing and cultural studies and a Bachelor of Laws (2016) from the University of Technology Sydney, and a Master of Laws from Harvard University (2018), where she was a Fulbright Scholar and was named the Dean's Scholar in Race, Gender and Criminal Law.

== Poetry ==
Whittaker's 2016 debut poetry collection Lemons in the Chicken Wire, which she has described as "a call to the humanity of Indigenous queer and trans mob." For it she was awarded a black&write! fellowship from the State Library of Queensland, which described the book as a "highly original collection of poems bristling with stunning imagery and gritty textures."

Her second poetry collection, BlakWork (2018), won the 2019 Judith Wright Calanthe Award. It has been described as a "discursively monumental collection [which] asserts unwavering pressure on the idea of 'Australia'," in "a voice seething with impatience, grief-stricken at the fate of this occupied place." A review in World Literature Today called her "Australia's most important recently emerged poet." A reviewer for the Sydney Review of Books said it was "a unique hybrid of poetry, memoir, reportage, legal documentation, fiction, non-fiction, satire, and social commentary [...] written from a Gomeroi, queer perspective." Whittaker was shortlisted for the Victorian Premier's Literary Award for Indigenous Writing for Blakwork.

Whittaker edited the 2020 collection Fire Front: First Nations Poetry and Power and presented a session of readings from it at the online 2020 Edinburgh International Book Festival. A review in ArtsHub Australia said that it gave "insights from some of the most original and talented First Nations writers and thinkers in our country." Writing in The Canberra Times, Geoff Page said that with one possible exception it was "the most ambitious attempt to update and/or replace" Kevin Gilbert's 1988 Inside Black Australia: An Anthology of Aboriginal Poetry, and that "the 53 poems in Fire Front do much to illustrate the variety of contemporary Aboriginal poetry in English."

== Research and writing ==
Whittaker's academic research interests include: Indigenous peoples and the law; critical legal and critical race studies; and First Nations deaths in custody. She has published a number of articles, chapters, and conference papers. She has written several pieces for The Guardian.

== Selected publications ==
- —— (2016). Lemons in the Chicken Wire. Magabala Books. ISBN 9781925360103.
- —— (2018). "Aboriginemo". In Heiss, Anita (ed.). Growing up Aboriginal in Australia. Black Inc. ISBN 978-1-86395-981-0.
- —— (2018). BlakWork. Magabala Books. ISBN 9781925360851.
- ——, ed. (2020). Fire Front : First Nations Poetry and Power Today. University of Queensland Press. ISBN 9780702262722.
