= Gregory Melleuish =

Australian historian (born 1954)

Gregory Melleuish (born 1954) is an Australian liberal conservative intellectual with an interest in the relationship between politics, religion and history. His work on political ideas is marked by the unusual, for Australia, emphasis it places on religion and religious ideas.

His father's family had been involved in education since the 1890s when his great-grandfather, the Rev C T Forscutt established Rockdale College. Subsequently, Rockdale College was replaced by Bexley Ladies College in 1910, and his grandparents took over running the school in 1922. It closed in 1957.

Greg Melleuish grew up initially in Kingsgrove where he attended Kingsgrove Infants School and MacCallum's Hill Public School. In 1963, he encountered his first major intellectual influence, The Best of Lennie Lower.

He won selection to Lakemba Public School Opportunity Class but was unable to attend when his family moved to Woy Woy when he was ten years old. He subsequently attended Woy Woy Public School and Woy Woy High School. Three of the memories of his schooldays are being bowled for a duck by future rugby league great Graham Eadie, competing in sport at Mount Penang Boys Home and playing tennis against future Australian Open tennis champion Mark Edmondson from Gosford High School.

Finishing school, he (foolishly?) chose to study Arts rather than Medicine at the University of Sydney. He commuted by train to university while an undergraduate and has a memory of sighting Spike Milligan and his mother on Woy Woy station. A highlight of his undergraduate career was when Henry Mayer indicated that one of his undergraduate essays might be publishable, but he failed (foolishly) to follow up.

Melleuish completed a BA (Honours) and a Master of Arts (Honours) in History for a thesis entitled 'The Sydney Intellectual Milieu c1850-c1865' from the University of Sydney. Upon embarking on his MA, Melleuish was given the advice by his cousin that he could either use the time to write a thesis on a narrow topic or educate himself more broadly. He chose the latter course which meant that he took additional time to complete the thesis but, like Les Murray, enlarged his knowledge and understanding in the stacks of Fisher Library.

In 1978, he was accepted to study medicine at the University of Sydney but again chose instead to join the elite Administrative Trainee Scheme with the Australian Public Service. Bureaucratic life did not agree with him and in late 1979 he joined the Australian Gaslight Company, which also did not agree with him.

In 1982 he was appointed as a tutor in the Department of History at the University of Melbourne in Eighteenth Century History when the person who had been originally appointed to the position could not take it up having developed total allergy syndrome. He taught at the University of Melbourne from 1982 to 1985. He was working in the department at the time of the Blainey Affair. He did not sign the letter condemning Blainey. He was never asked as he was away from Melbourne at the time.

In 1987 he was appointed to the position of Lecturer in Australian Studies at the University of Queensland, a position that he held until the end of 1992. During that time he completed his PhD which would subsequently become Cultural Liberalism in Australia (CUP, 1995). The thesis was completed with some controversy when his supervisor, disliking one of the chapters on political grounds, washed her hands of it. The thesis submission process was taken over by Geoffrey Bolton who arranged for suitable examiners, who passed it without any corrections being required.

While at the University of Queensland he also worked with Geoff Stokes building up the field of Australian political thought.

Melleuish was appointed as lecturer in Politics at the University of Wollongong in 1993 where he remained until 2025. Melleuish devised subjects and taught in a number of areas during that time ranging across Politics, History and Australian Studies. These included Australian politics, political ideologies, democratic theory, state theory, world history, modern European history and ancient history, both Greece and Rome. His major concern as a teacher was not to inculcate students with a particular view of the world but to make them aware that they needed to exercise judgement intelligently when coming to an interpretation of a particular topic.

In 2005 Melleuish was 'king hit' while walking to work but was fortunate to be one of the 10% of such victims who walk away with no serious injuries.

In 2006, Melleuish delivered a paper at the Australian History Summit advocating the use of narrative in the teaching of Australian history. He was not successful in this endeavour falling prey, as Geoffrey Robinson puts it, to 'the foxes such as Hirst.'

Between 2017 and 2019 Melleuish was a member of the judging panel for non-fiction and Australian history for the Prime Minister's Literary Awards.

During this time, despite strenuous opposition from a number of people in the university with particular political predilections, he became a professor in 2017. He was told by a member of the promotion committee that his Dean had used the fact that he had published a book with Connor Court to argue against his promotion in 2014.

From 2013 onwards he was subjected to significant bullying, primarily because of his political views, and because he was the only member of the university conducting research on religious topics. Towards the end of his career at Wollongong, student complaints were manufactured in an attempt to discredit him.

It was with some relief that Melleuish took a redundancy in March 2025 to escape what had become a toxic workplace. He has severed all ties with the university. The university subsequently has become the subject of an ICAC investigation.

Over the years Melleuish has published hundreds of written pieces ranging from opinion pieces, largely for the Australian and the Conversation, journal/magazine articles, refereed journal articles, book chapters and books. He has published at least one article in Quadrant in every decade from the 1970s to the 2020s. His publications range over a wide array of topics from Australian history and politics and religion to political theory, religious studies, the history of political thought and religion, Western civilisation, world history, historical sociology, education and the history of universities, and philosophy.

Since 2013 Melleuish has published a number of articles with Dr Susanna Rizzo, in journals including Telos, Cosmos and History and Histories on topics relating to religion, politics, history and the development of the West. In 2026 they jointly published Understanding Piety and Theology in the Culture of the West (Routledge).

Melleuish has also jointly published articles and books with Dr Stephen Chavura, including The Unknown Menzies, (MUP 2021) and Dr Zachary Gorman, including an article on the nexus clause in the Australian Constitution. Melleuish and Gorman are currently completing a book on Menzies and the Forgotten People broadcasts.

Melleuish is currently a Fellow of Campion College and a Professorial Fellow of the Robert Menzies Institute. He is also on the editorial board of Telos and The Dorchester Review as well as being the Cultural History section editor for Histories.

Melleuish is described by Geoffrey Robinson in his The Liberal Mind in a Conservative Party as a liberal conservative with a nostalgia for nineteenth century liberalism. His intellectual heroes in the Australian context are figures such as John Woolley, liberal Anglican thinker and first Principal of the University of Sydney, whose writings introduced him to the Cambridge Platonist John Smith (Select Discourses 1660), John West, editor of the Sydney Morning Herald in the 1850s and 1860s, who was critical of the failings of colonial democracy, and who denounced the Lambing Flats rioters, and W K Hancock who made a major critique of the workings of Australian democracy in Australia (1930).

== Bibliography ==
- Cultural Liberalism in Australia: A study in intellectual and cultural history (CUP 1995)
- The Packaging of Australia: Politics and culture wars (UNSW Press 1998)
- A Short History of Australian Liberalism (CIS 2001)
- Union Amongst the Colonies (Australian Scholarly Publishing 2001) (with John West)
- Blaming Ourselves: September 11 and the agony of the left (Duffy & Snellgrove 2002) (edited with Imre Salusinszky)
- The Power of Ideas: Essays on Australian politics and history (Australian Scholarly Publishing 2009)
- World History and Western Civilisation, (Institute of Public Affairs, 2012)
- Australian Intellectuals: Their strange history and pathological tendencies (Connor Court 2013)
- "The Machiavellian takeover of Australian universities". Quadrant. 62 (1–2 [543]): 66–74. January–February 2018.
- The Forgotten Menzies: The world picture of Australia's longest-serving prime minister, co-authored by Stephen A. Chavura (Melbourne University Press 2021)
- Understanding Piety and Theology in the Culture of the West: The Poetic Life, co-authored with Susanna G. Rizzo (Routledge 2026)
