= David Metzenthen =

Australian writer for children and young adults

- Born: 1958 (age 67–68); Melbourne, Victoria, Australia
- Occupation: dancer
- Writing career
- Language: English
- Notable works: Johnny Hart's Heroes, Jarvis 24

David Metzenthen (born 1958) is an Australian writer for children and young adults who was born in Melbourne, Victoria.

After completing his schooling in Melbourne, Metzenthen traveled to New Zealand where he held a variety of jobs. After returning to Australia he worked as a copywriter for Radio 3DB, for Grundy Television and for Myer before deciding to write full-time.

He now lives in Melbourne with his wife and two children.

== Bibliography ==
=== Novels ===
- Metzenthen, David (1990). Danger wave. Sydney: Ashton Scholastic.
- Lee Spain (1991)
- Johnny Hart's Heroes (1996)
- Finn and the Big Guy (1997)
- Falling Forward (1998)
- Gilbert's Ghost Train (1998)
- Mick the Mimic (1998)
- The Red Hot Footy Fiasco (1998)
- Stony Heart Country (1999)
- The Colour of Sunshine (2000)
- Wildlight: A Journey (2002)
- Boys of Blood and Bone (2003)
- Tiff and the Trout (2004)
- Blackwater (2007)
- Jarvis 24 (2009)
- Tigerfish (2014)
- Dreaming the Enemy (2016)

=== Novellas ===
- Roadie (1995)
- Animal Instinct (1996)
- Dreaming the Enemy (2016)
- The Secret History of the Rainbow Trout Private Hotel (2023)
- The Truth of It (2025)

=== Children's fiction ===
- Brocky's Bananagram (1994)
- Cody and Zero (1997)
- The Diary of Fat Robbie Pile (1997)
- Lefty Lemon Kicks Goals (1997)
- Fort Island (1998)
- Adrian Over the Top (1999)
- Adrian Goes Out There (1999)
- The Red Boxing Gloves (2002)
- The Really Really High Diving Board (2003)
- Spider! (2004)
- Time Turns on Spooky Hill (2004)
- Anton Rocks On (2004)
- Roller-Coaster (2005)
- The Really Really Epic Mini Bike Ride (2006)
- Winning the World Cup (2007)
- The Really Nearly Deadly Canoe Ride (2009)
- Hide that Horse! (2009)
- Squidnapped! (2010)
- Save Our Sharks (2012)
- Freda the Free-Range Chook (2012)
- George Parker Goes Global (2018)
- Augustin and the Hot Air Balloon (2022)

=== Picture books ===
- The Rainbirds (2006) illustrated by Sally Rippin
- One Minute's Silence (2014) illustrated by Michael Camilleri
- One Runaway Rabbit (2019) illustrated by Mairead Murphy
- Where Will the Sleepy Sheep Sleep? (2023) illustrated by Jonathan Bentley

=== Critical studies and reviews of Metzenthen's work ===
- Kavanagh, Bec (September 2014). "[Untitled review of Tigerfish]". Australian Book Review. 364: 44.

== Awards ==
- 1996 winner New South Wales Premier's Literary Awards — Ethel Turner Prize for Young People's Literature — The Ethel Turner Prize for Children's Writing — Johnny Hart's Heroes
- 1997 honour book Children's Book Council Book of the Year Awards — Book of the Year: Older Readers — Johnny Hart's Heroes
- 1998 honour book Children's Book Council Book of the Year Awards — Book of the Year: Older Readers — Gilbert's Ghost Train
- 2003 winner Victorian Premier's Literary Awards — Prize for Young Adult Fiction — Wildlight: A Journey
- 2003 winner Queensland Premier's Literary Awards — Best Young Adult Book — Boys of Blood and Bone
- 2004 honour book Children's Book Council Book of the Year Awards — Book of the Year: Older Readers — Boys of Blood and Bone
- 2007 honour book Children's Book Council Book of the Year Awards — Picture Book of the Year — The Rainbirds
- 2008 honour book Children's Book Council Book of the Year Awards — Book of the Year: Older Readers — Black Water
- 2010 winner Children's Book Council Book of the Year Awards — Book of the Year: Older Readers — Jarvis
- 2015 honour book Children's Book Council Book of the Year Awards — Picture Book of the Year — One Minute's Silence
- 2016 winner Queensland Literary Awards — Griffith University Young Adult Book Award — Dreaming the Enemy
- 2025 winner Children's Peace Literature Award — South Australian Psychologists for Peace — The Truth of It
