= Australasian Business Intelligence =

Australasian Business Intelligence is an Australian business service, database and journal, providing information on international business. It was established on 1 April 1993, and is owned by LexisNexis. It appears three times a year, and the headquarters is in South Yarra, Melbourne. Some large libraries subscribe to the Australasian Business Intelligence.
