= Dion Beasley =

Australian artist

Dion Beasley is an artist and illustrator from Tennant Creek in the Northern Territory of Australia.

== Early life ==
Beasley is an Alywarr man who was born in Alice Springs in 1991. He spent his early years in the remote community of Owairtilla, also known as Canteen Creek, before relocating to Tennant Creek.

Beasley has muscular dystrophy and is deaf.

== Art ==
Beasley developed an interest in drawing at a young age which has helped him to communicate. Dion predominately draws dogs and elements of community life.

Dion is known to regularly visit his grandfather at Mulga Camp on the edge of Tennant Creek where he fed the camp dogs. They inspired his prolific drawings of them in a variety of moods and situations.

Dion's first exhibition was at the Darwin Entertainment Centre in 2018, entitled A Dog’s Life. It then travelled through the eastern states of Australia.

With the assistance of carer Joie Boulter, he also creates etchings, photography and modeling, and has his own clothing label “Cheeky Dog” which launched in 2006.

He has illustrated three books Too Many Cheeky Dogs and Go Home Cheeky Animals! and Cheeky Dogs: To Lake Nash and Back.

== Accolades ==
Go Home Cheeky Animals! was named Book of the Year from the Children's Book Council of Australia in the Early Childhood category in 2017.

Australia Council for the Arts inaugural National Arts and Disability Award in 2019.
