= Sally Rippin =

Australian author and illustrator of children's books

- Born: Darwin, Northern Territory, Australia
- Occupations: Children's writer and illustrator
- Writing career
- Notable awards: Australian Children's Laureate (2024–2025)

Sally Rippin is an Australian children's writer and illustrator. She was the 2024–2025 Australian Children's Laureate.

== Biography ==
Rippin was born in Darwin, in the Northern Territory. She grew up in South-East Asia.

In 2022 Rippin published Wild Thing, based on her research into learning difficulties and dyslexia as a guidebook for other parents.

In February 2024, it was reported that Rippin was Australia's highest-selling woman author and that her books had sold over 10 million copies worldwide.

Rippin was appointed the Australian Children's Laureate for 2024–2025. In the role, she travelled around Australia to promote reading. Her motto was "All kids can be readers".

In July 2025 Rippin was appointed a member of the newly created Writing Australia Council, a peak body funded by the Australian government to support and promote Australian literature and the book publishing industry.

== Selected publications ==
=== As author ===
==== Series ====
- The Billie B Brown series
- Billie Adventures
- Billie Mysteries
- Polly and Buster series
- School for Monsters series
- Super Mooper series, co-authored with Fiona Harris and Scott Edgar
- Our Australian Girl series
- Hey Jack! series

==== Individual books ====
- Come Over to My House, co-authored with Eliza Hull, Bright Light ISBN 9781761210082 (2022) – winner, Speech Pathology Australia Book of the Year Awards, Three to Five Years, 2023; winner, Picture Books, DANZ Children's Book Award
- Wild Things: How we learn to read and what can happen if we don't, Hardie Grant, ISBN 9781760507640 (2022)

=== As illustrator ===
- Fang Fang's Chinese New Year, Omnibus Books, ISBN 1862912912 (1996) – winner CBCA Book of the Year Awards, CBCA Award for New Illustrator, 1997
