= Cassandra Golds =

Australian children's author (born 1962)

- Born: 1962 (age 63–64)
- Occupation: Children's author
- Genre: Children's literature Young adult fiction
- Years active: 1985–present
- Notable works: The Three Loves of Persimmon; Clair-de-Lune

Cassandra Golds (born 1962) is an Australian children's author.

== Career ==
Her first book, Michael and the Secret War, was accepted for publication when she was nineteen years old. In collaboration with the artist Stephen Axelsen, she went on to write a number of graphic novels, all of which were published as monthly serials in New South Wales School Magazine. Her writing has been described as part parable, part surrealist fable and part love story. Her novel, The Three Loves of Persimmon, was winner of the in 2011 Victorian Premier's Prize for Writing for Young Adults and shortlisted for the Prime Minister's Literary Awards, New South Wales Premier's Literary Awards and WA Premier's Literary Awards.

The artist Sonia Kretschmar submitted a painting of the author to the 2011 Archibald Prize.

== Publications ==
- Michael and the Secret War (1985; US edition 1989)
- Clair-de-Lune (2004; US & UK editions 2006) Also issued as an audiobook in 2008 by Bolinda Audio.
- The Mostly True Story of Matthew and Trim (2005, a graphic novel created with Stephen Axelsen).
- The Museum of Mary Child (2009; Australian edition)
- The Three Loves of Persimmon (2010; Australian edition)
- Pureheart (2013; Australian edition)

== External links to reviews, notices ==
- 'Ballet dancer strikes perfect balance' Review by Amanda Craig The Times 8 April 2006
- 'Dance fever: Adèle Geras thinks Clair-de-Lune by Cassandra Golds was written especially for her' Adèle Geras The Guardian, Saturday 15 April 2006
- Short interview with Cassandra Golds about Clair-de-Lune on Behindballet the blog of the Australian Ballet 17 July 2009
