= Judith Clarke =

Australian writer for children and young adults (1943–2020)

- Born: 24 August 1943 Sydney, New South Wales, Australia
- Died: 14 May 2020 (aged 76) Melbourne, Victoria, Australia
- Occupation: Author, teacher, librarian
- Education: University of New South Wales; Australian National University
- Genre: Children's literature, young adult fiction
- Years active: 1980s–2017
- Notable works: Wolf on the Fold (2002); Kalpana's Dream (2004); One Whole and Perfect Day (2006); My Lovely Frankie (2017)
- Notable awards: Michael L. Printz Honor Book; Queensland Premier’s Literary Award (Young Adult); Children’s Book Council of Australia Award

Judith Clarke (24 August 1943 – 14 May 2020) was an Australian best-selling author of short stories for children and young adults.

== Life ==
Clarke was born on 24 August 1943 and raised in Sydney. She worked as a teacher, lecturer and librarian. She graduated from the University of New South Wales, and Australian National University.

Clarke died on 14 May 2020 in Melbourne.

== Awards ==
- Young People's Talking Book of the Year Award (1991) from the Variety Club
- Boston Globe-Horn Book Honor Book in Fiction and Poetry, for Kalpana's Dream
- Children's Books of the Year Awards Winner-Children's Book Council of Australia, for Wolf on the Fold
- Children's Books of the Year Awards Honor, Older Readers, for Night Train (Holt, 2000), by the Children's Book Council of Australia
- Victorian Premier's Literary Awards Winner, by Young Adult Fiction-State Library of Victoria, Australia
- Queensland Premier’s Literary Young Adult Book Award winner (2007) for One Whole and Perfect Day
- Michael L. Printz Honor Book, for One Whole and Perfect Day
- Prime Minister's Literary Award, Young Adult Fiction (2018) shortlisted for My Lovely Frankie

== Works ==
- The boy on the lake: stories of the supernatural, University of Queensland Press, 1989, ISBN 978-0-7022-2203-0
- Riffraff, H. Holt, 1992, ISBN 978-0-8050-1774-8
- Friend of my Heart, University of Queensland Press, 1994, ISBN 978-0-7022-2699-1
- Panic stations, University of Queensland Press, 1995, ISBN 978-0-7022-2696-0
- Big Night Out, Shorts, 1995, ISBN 978-1-86291-266-3
- Lost Day, Puffin Books, 1997, ISBN 9780140382907
- Nighttrain, Puffin, 1998, ISBN 978-0-14-038772-8
- Starry Nights, Allen & Unwin, 2001, ISBN 978-1-86508-604-0
- Wolf on the Fold, Allen & Unwin, 2002, ISBN 978-1-86508-796-2
- Kalpana's Dream, Allen & Unwin, 2004, ISBN 9781741142532
- One Whole and Perfect Day, Allen & Unwin, 2006, ISBN 978-1-74114-856-5; (Front Street, 2007) ISBN 978-1-932425-95-6
- The Winds of Heaven, Allen & Unwin, 2009, ISBN 978-1-74175-731-6
- Capsella series
  - The heroic life of Al Capsella, University of Queensland Press, 1988, ISBN 978-0-7022-2109-5
  - Al Capsella takes a vacation, Holt, 1993, ISBN 978-0-8050-2685-6
- My Lovely Frankie, Allen & Unwin, 2017, ISBN 9781760296339
