= 2018 in Australian literature =

This article presents a list of the historical events and publications of Australian literature during 2018.

== Major publications ==
=== Literary fiction ===
- Michael Mohammed Ahmad – The Lebs
- Robbie Arnott – Flames
- Trent Dalton – Boy Swallows Universe
- Gregory Day – A Sand Archive
- Ceridwen Dovey – In the Garden of the Fugitives
- Rodney Hall – A Stolen Season
- Gail Jones – The Death of Noah Glass
- Eleanor Limprecht – The Passengers
- Melissa Lucashenko – Too Much Lip
- Liane Moriarty – Nine Perfect Strangers
- Heather Morris – The Tattooist of Auschwitz
- Kristina Olsson – Shell
- Ryan O'Neill – The Drover's Wives
- Tracy Sorensen – The Lucky Galah
- Elise Valmorbida – The Madonna of the Mountains
- Tim Winton – The Shepherd's Hut
- Markus Zusak – Bridge of Clay

=== Children's and Young Adult fiction ===
- Maxine Beneba Clarke – Wide Big World, illustrated by Isobel Knowles
- Mem Fox – Bonnie and Ben Rhyme Again, illustrated by Judy Horacek
- Andy Griffiths – The 104-Storey Treehouse
- Ambelin Kwaymullina and Ezekial Kwaymullina – Catching Teller Crow
- Richard Roxburgh – Artie and the Grime Wave
- Shaun Tan
  - Cicada
  - Tales from the Inner City
- Lili Wilkinson – After the Lights Go Out

=== Crime and Mystery ===
- Garry Disher – Kill Shot
- Candice Fox – Redemption Point
- Kerry Greenwood – The Spotted Dog
- Chris Hammer – Scrublands
- Jane Harper – The Lost Man
- Dervla McTiernan – The Rúin
- Kate Morton – The Clockmaker's Daughter
- Michael Robotham – The Other Wife
- Sue Williams – Live and Let Fry

=== Science Fiction and Fantasy ===
- Alan Baxter
  - Hidden City
  - Devouring Dark
- Kylie Chan – Scales of Empire
- Traci Harding – This Present Past
- Sam Hawke – City of Lies
- Jennifer Mills – Dyschronia
- Kaaron Warren – Tide of Stone

=== Poetry ===
- Jordie Albiston – Warlines
- Judith Beveridge – Sun Music: New and Selected Poems
- Ken Bolton – Starting at Basheer's
- Sarah Day – Towards Light & Other Poems
- Brook Emery ed. — Naming the Particulars
- Paul Hetherington – Moonlight on Oleander
- Bella Li – Lost Lake
- John Mateer – João
- Tim Metcalf – The Underwritten Plain
- Tracy Ryan – The Water Bearer

=== Drama ===
- Alana Valentine – The Sugar House
- David Williamson – Nearer the Gods

=== Biographies and memoirs ===
- Peter FitzSimons – Monash's Masterpiece
- Jacqui Lambie – Rebel with a Cause: You can't keep a bloody Lambie down — my story from soldier to senator and beyond
- Vicki Laveau-Harvie – The Erratics
- Bri Lee – Eggshell Skull
- Anne Summers – Unfettered and Alive: A Memoir
- Gillian Triggs – Speaking Up
- Nadia Wheatley – Her Mother's Daughter

=== Non-fiction ===
- Cynthia Banham – A Certain Light
- Steve Biddulph – Raising Boys In The Twenty-First Century: How To Help Our Boys Become Open-Hearted, Kind And Strong Men
- Behrouz Boochani – No Friend But the Mountains
- Stephen Gapps – The Sydney Wars: Conflict in the Early Colony 1788–1817
- Richard Glover – The Land Before Avocado
- Billy Griffiths – Deep Time Dreaming
- Anita Heiss (editor) – Growing Up Aboriginal in Australia
- Chloe Hooper – The Arsonist: A Mind on Fire
- Thomas Keneally – Australians: A Short History
- Meredith Lake – The Bible in Australia: A cultural history
- Michael C. Madden – The Victoria Cross: Australia Remembers
- Leigh Sales – Any Ordinary Day
- Maria Tumarkin – Axiomatic

== Awards and honours ==
Note: these awards were presented in the year in question.

=== Lifetime achievement ===
Award	Author
Melbourne Prize for Literature	Alison Lester
Mona Brand Award	Patricia Cornelius
Patrick White Award	Samuel Wagan Watson

=== Literary ===
Award	Author	Title	Publisher
ABIA Book of the Year	Jessica Townsend	Nevermoor: The Trials of Morrigan Crow	Lothian
ALS Gold Medal	Shastra Deo	The Agonist	University of Queensland Press
Colin Roderick Award	Jock Serong	On the Java Ridge	Text Publishing
Indie Book Awards Book of the Year	Jessica Townsend	Nevermoor: The Trials of Morrigan Crow	Lothian
Nita Kibble Literary Award	Fiona McFarlane	The High Places	Hodder and Stoughton
Stella Prize	Alexis Wright	Tracker	Giramondo
Victorian Prize for Literature	Sarah Krasnostein	The Trauma Cleaner: One Woman's Extraordinary; Life in Death, Decay & Disaster	Text Publishing

=== Fiction ===
==== International ====
Award	Author	Title	Publisher
Staunch Book Prize	Jock Serong	On the Java Ridge	Text Publishing

==== National ====
Award	Author	Title	Publisher
ABIA General Fiction Book of the Year	Michael Robotham	The Secrets She Keeps	Hachette Australia
ABIA Literary Fiction Book of the Year	Sarah Schmidt	See What I Have Done	Hachette Australia
Adelaide Festival Awards for Literature	Eva Hornung	The Last Garden	Text Publishing
The Australian/Vogel Literary Award	Emily O'Grady	The Yellow House	Allen & Unwin
Barbara Jefferis Award	Libby Angel	The Trapeze Act	Text Publishing
Indie Book Awards Book of the Year – Fiction	Sofie Laguna	The Choke	Allen & Unwin
Indie Book Awards Book of the Year – Debut Fiction	Mark Brandi	Wimmera	Hachette Australia
Miles Franklin Award	Michelle de Kretser	The Life to Come	Allen & Unwin
Prime Minister's Literary Awards	Gerald Murnane	Border Districts	Giramondo
New South Wales Premier's Literary Awards	Bram Presser	The Book of Dirt	Text Publishing
Queensland Literary Awards	Kim Scott	Taboo	Pan Macmillan
Victorian Premier's Literary Award	Melanie Cheng	Australia Day	Text Publishing
Voss Literary Prize	Bram Presser	The Book of Dirt	Text Publishing

=== Children and Young Adult ===
==== National ====
Award	Category	Author	Title	Publisher
Australian Book Industry Awards	Older Children	Danielle Binks (editor)	Begin, End, Begin: A #LoveOzYA Anthology	HarperCollins
Australian Book Industry Awards	Younger Children	Jessica Townsend	Nevermoor: The Trials of Morrigan Crow	Lothian
Australian Book Industry Awards	Picture Book	Zoë Foster Blake	No One Likes a Fart	Viking Books
Children's Book of the Year Award	Older Readers	Cath Crowley, Fiona Wood and Simmone Howell	Take Three Girls	Pan Macmillan
Children's Book of the Year Award	Younger Readers	Bren MacDibble	How to Bee	Allen & Unwin
Children's Book of the Year Award	Picture Book	Gwyn Perkins	A Walk in the Bush	Affirm Press
Children's Book of the Year Award	Early Childhood	Michael Gerard Bauer; Chrissie Krebs (illustrator)	Rodney Loses It!	Omnibus Books
Children's Book of the Year Award	Eve Pownall Award for Information Books	Idan Ben-Barak, illus. Julian Frost	Do Not Lick This Book	Allen & Unwin
Indie Book Awards Book of the Year	Children's	Jessica Townsend	Nevermoor: The Trials of Morrigan Crow	Lothian
Indie Book Awards Book of the Year	Young Adult	Mark Smith	Wilder Country	Text Publishing
New South Wales Premier's Literary Awards	Children's	Bren MacDibble	How to Bee	Allen & Unwin
New South Wales Premier's Literary Awards	Young People's	Zana Fraillon	The Ones That Disappeared	Lothian
Victorian Premier's Literary Award	Young Adult Fiction	Demet Divaroren	Living on Hope Street	Allen & Unwin

=== Crime and Mystery ===
==== National ====
Award	Category	Author	Title	Publisher
Davitt Award	Novel	Emma Viskic	And Fire Came Down	Echo Books
Davitt Award	Young adult novel	Vikki Wakefield	Ballad for a Mad Girl	Text Publishing
Davitt Award	Children's novel	Allison Rushby	The Turnkey	Walker Books
Davitt Award	True crime	Gabriella Coslovich	Whitely on Trial	Melbourne University Press
Davitt Award	Debut novel	Sarah Bailey	The Dark Lake	Allen & Unwin
Davitt Award	Readers' choice	Jane Harper	Force of Nature	Pan Macmillan
Ned Kelly Award	Novel	Sulari Gentill	Crossing the Lines	Pantera
Ned Kelly Award	First novel	Sarah Bailey	The Dark Lake	Allen & Unwin
Ned Kelly Award	True crime	Graham Archer	Unmaking a Murder: The Mysterious Death of Anna-Jane Cheney	Random House
Ned Kelly Award	Lifetime achievement	Garry Disher		

=== Science fiction ===
Award	Category	Author	Title	Publisher
Ditmar Award	Novel	Thoraiya Dyer	Crossroads of Canopy	Tor
Ditmar Award	Best Novella or Novelette	Tansy Rayner Roberts	"Girl Reporter"	Girl Reporter (Book Smugglers Publishing)
Ditmar Award	Best Short Story	Janeen Webb	"A Pearl Beyond Price"	Cthulhu Deep Down-Under Vol 1 (IFWG Publishing Australia)

=== Poetry ===
Award	Author	Title	Publisher
Adelaide Festival Awards for Literature	Pam Brown	Missing Up	Vagabond Press
Anne Elder Award	Rico Craig	Bone Ink	Guillotine Press
Mary Gilmore Award	Quinn Eades	Rallying	UWA Publishing
Prime Minister's Literary Awards	Brian Castro	Blindness and Rage: A Phantasmagoria	Giramondo Publishing
New South Wales Premier's Literary Awards	Bella Li	Argosy	Vagabond Press
Queensland Literary Awards	Michael Farrell	I Love Poetry	Giramondo Publishing
Victorian Premier's Literary Award	Bella Li	Argosy	Vagabond Press

=== Drama ===
Award	Category	Author	Title	Publisher
New South Wales Premier's Literary Awards	Script (joint winners)	Amanda Blue and Jacob Hickey	Deep Water: The Real Story	Blackfella Films
New South Wales Premier's Literary Awards	Script (joint winners)	Jane Campion and Gerard Lee	Birthday, Top of the Lake: China Girl, Series 2 Episode 4	See Saw Films
New South Wales Premier's Literary Awards	Play	Nakkiah Lui	Black is the New White	Sydney Theatre Company
Patrick White Playwrights' Award	Award	Mark Rogers	Superheroes	Griffin Theatre Company
Patrick White Playwrights' Award	Fellowship	Nakkiah Lui		

=== Non-Fiction ===
Award	Category	Author	Title	Publisher
Australian Book Industry Awards	General Non-Fiction	Sarah Krasnostein	The Trauma Cleaner	Text Publishing
Australian Book Industry Awards	Biography	Jimmy Barnes	Working Class Man	HarperCollins
Adelaide Festival Awards for Literature	Non-Fiction	Tim Winton	The Boy Behind the Curtain	Penguin Books
Indie Book Awards Book of the Year	Non-Fiction	Richard Fidler & Kári Gíslason	Saga Land	HarperCollins
Indie Book Awards Book of the Year	Illustrated Non-Fiction	Kate Herd & Jela Ivankovic-Waters	Native: Art & Design with Australian Plants	Thames & hudson
National Biography Award	Biography	Judith Brett	The Enigmatic Mr Deakin	Text Publishing
New South Wales Premier's Literary Awards	Non-Fiction	Paul Ham	Passchendaele: Requiem for Doomed Youth	William Heinemann Australia
New South Wales Premier's History Awards	Australian History	Christina Twomey	The Battle Within: POWs in Postwar Australia	NewSouth Publishing
New South Wales Premier's History Awards	Community and Regional History	Paul Irish	Hidden in Plain View: The Aboriginal People of Coastal Sydney	NewSouth Publishing
New South Wales Premier's History Awards	General History	Sean Scalmer	On the Stump: Campaign Oratory and Democracy in the United States, Britain, and Australia	Temple University Press
Queensland Literary Awards	Non-Fiction	Alexis Wright	Tracker	Giramondo Publishing
Victorian Premier's Literary Award	Non-fiction	Sarah Krasnostein	The Trauma Cleaner: One Woman's Extraordinary Life in Death, Decay & Disaster	Text Publishing

== Deaths ==
- 6 March – Peter Nicholls, writer and editor of The Encyclopedia of Science Fiction (born 1939)
- 8 March – Peter Temple, author of Jack Irish series (born 1946)
- 3 April – Noela Young, children's book illustrator and writer (born 1930)
- 14 April – Frank Bren, Australian actor and playwright (born 1943)
- 16 April – Beverley Farmer, novelist and short story writer (born 1941)
- 1 June – Jill Ker Conway, academic and memoir writer, author of The Road from Coorain (born 1934)
- 2 June – Tony Morphett, screenwriter and novelist (born 1938)
- 30 August – Peter Corris, crime novelist (born 1942)
- 31 August – Ian Jones author and television writer and director (born 1931)
- 12 September – Albert Ullin OAM, German Australian children's bookseller and founder of Australia's first children's bookstore, The Little Bookroom (born 1930)
- 16 September – John Molony, historian and Emeritus Professor of History at Australian National University (born 1927)
- 6 October – James Cowan, author (born 1942)
- 21 October – Eleanor Witcombe, screenwriter and playwright (born 1923)
- 22 October
  - Anne Fairbairn, poet, journalist and expert in Arab culture (born 1928)
  - Rose Zwi, novelist (born 1928)
- 22 November – Judith Rodriguez, poet and academic (born 1936)

== See also ==
- 2018 in Australia
- 2018 in literature
- 2018 in poetry
- List of years in Australian literature
- List of years in literature
