= Sandra Pankhurst =

Businessperson and abuse survivor

- Born: 26 May 1953; Melbourne, Victoria
- Died: 6 July 2021 (aged 68)
- Known for: Crime scene cleaning services, activism

Sandra Pankhurst (26 May 1953 – 6 July 2021) was an Australian businesswoman. She was adopted as an infant and grew up in West Footscray, Melbourne. Following an abusive childhood, Pankhurst would go on to work in different fields as a sex worker, taxi receptionist, and the first female funeral director in Victoria. Pankhurst was transgender, having transitioned from male to female in the late 1970s. She became well known after founding a cleaning business that cleaned the sites of hoarding and homicide. She died on 6 July 2021.

== Early life ==
Pankhurst was born male in 1953. She was adopted through the Catholic church to Bill and Ailsa Downs in West Footscray, Melbourne. Her adoptive parents had one existing child, adopting Pankhurst after losing a son during childbirth and being told they could have no more children. Despite this, the family would go on to have two more children, and after the second was born, Pankhurst was told she had been adopted as a replacement for the son they had lost and her adoption was a mistake. She has described the trauma of her father's alcoholism and physical and emotional abuse from both parents. Pankhurst had a mixed relationship with her adoptive mother, Ailsa. She enjoyed cooking and would attempt to participate in her household chores and tried to protect her mother from violence at her father’s hands. Pankhurst was forced to live in a bungalow that her father built, excluded from the family home, and denied food and access to the bathroom.

Isolated by her family, Pankhurst sought company in the nuns at St Joseph's Convent regularly after finishing school. She would work chores and was rewarded with food. At age thirteen, she started working part-time at a local barber shop, spending her pay on clothing and gifts for her siblings, some of which were destroyed by her adoptive father, who continued to regularly abuse her. The father forced her to join army cadets after Pankhurst refused to engage in play with boys and sought the company of girls. Pankhurst tried in vain to win the affection of her adoptive parents but never succeeded in doing so.

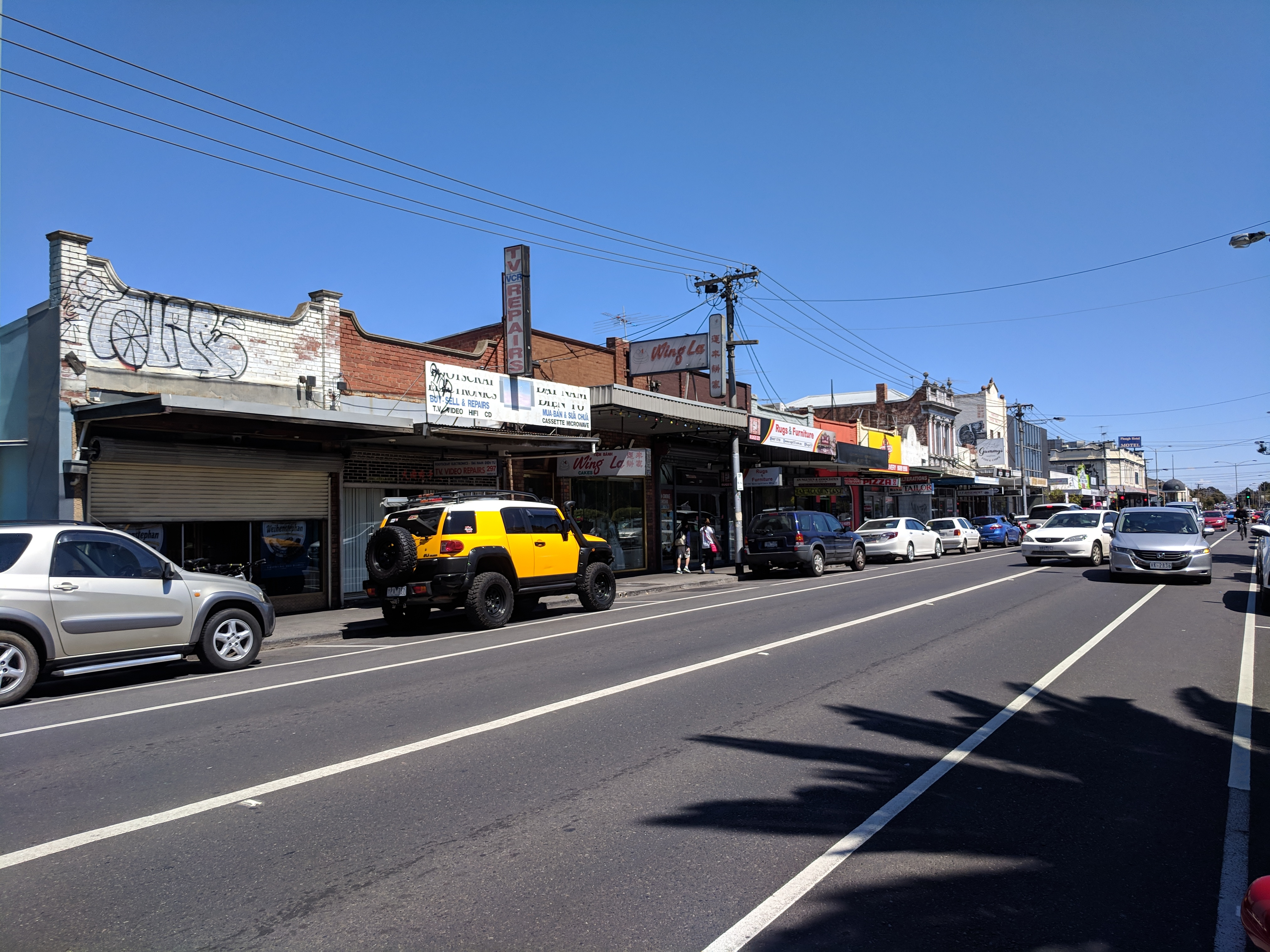
Barkly Street in Footscray, near Pankhurst's childhood home

== Later years and career ==
Pankhurst was evicted from home at 17 and then resided with a family friend, where she would live for approximately six months. The family friend arranged for Pankhurst to move in with their son and assisted her in obtaining work as a fitter and turner, which Pankhurst did not enjoy and for this reason applied successfully to work in the factory's laboratory instead. Pankhurst was working in this position on 15 October 1975, when she witnessed the infamous collapse of the Westgate Bridge.

Pankhurst would go on to marry a woman and have two sons, Brendan and Adrian. Then known as Stephen, Pankhurst left her wife Maureen (known as Linda in her biography) and started dancing in St Kilda before turning to prostitution in order to cope financially. During this time, she underwent gender reassignment surgery. She became known as Sandra Vaughan. Pankhurst ceased prostituting after a vicious rape, working several jobs in dry cleaning and as a taxi receptionist. She eventually became a funeral director - the first woman in Victoria to do so. She remarried, this time to a man named George Pankhurst, though they eventually divorced, remaining friends until his passing. She became well known after founding a business - Specialist Trauma Cleaning Services, a cleaning company specialising in crime scene cleanup and hoarder restoration.

== Works ==
The life of Pankhurst was documented in The Trauma Cleaner, released in 2017 and written by Sarah Krasnostein, which was critically acclaimed, winning the Douglas Stewart prize for non-fiction at the 2019 New South Wales Premier's Literary Awards. A documentary film of her life, Clean, was made over a three-year period and debuted in August 2022 at SXSW. The film was described by Variety as "an inspirational doc[umentary] about tidying up life's biggest messes using chemicals and kindness".

== Health issues and death ==
Pankhurst had severe pulmonary disease, suspected to have been acquired from her early years of working as a cleaner without appropriate personal protective equipment. She also suffered from cirrhosis of the liver. She died in 2021.
