= New South Wales Premier's Literary Awards =

Literary prizes awarded by the New South Wales state government in Australia

The New South Wales Premier's Literary Awards, also known as the NSW Premier's Literary Awards, were first awarded in 1979. They are among the richest literary awards in Australia. Notable prizes include the Christina Stead Prize for Fiction, the Kenneth Slessor Prize for Poetry, and the Douglas Stewart Prize for Non-Fiction.

As of 2019, the Awards are presented by the NSW Government and administered by the State Library of New South Wales in association with Create NSW, with support of Multicultural NSW and the University of Technology Sydney (UTS). Total prize money in 2019 was up to A$305,000, with eligibility limited to writers, translators and illustrators with Australian citizenship or permanent resident status.

== History ==
The NSW Premier's Literary Awards were established in 1979 by the New South Wales Premier Neville Wran. Commenting on its purpose, Wran said: "We want the arts to take, and be seen to take, their proper place in our social priorities. If governments treat writers and artists with respect and understanding, the community will be more likely to do the same." They were the first set of premier's awards offered in Australia.

The awards were not presented in 1998 as the eligibility dates were amended.

== Judging ==
The winners of most of the prizes and awards are decided by a judging panel, with no input from Create NSW (former Arts NSW) or the New South Wales Government. The names of each year's judges are not announced until the final winners are decided. The judging has been the subject of controversy in the past, when in 2010, the panel decided not to bestow the Play Award on any of the applicants.

In November 2011, the NSW Government announced a review of the Premier's Literary Awards for 2012. An independent panel, chaired by journalist Gerard Henderson, reviewed both the Literary and the Premier's History Awards, focussed on the governance, selection criteria and judging processes. Following the review, the Awards are managed by the State Library of NSW, in association with Create NSW.

== Categories ==
The following prizes and awards are currently given in the New South Wales Premier's Literary Awards.

- Christina Stead Prize for Fiction
- Douglas Stewart Prize for Non-Fiction
- Kenneth Slessor Prize for Poetry
- Ethel Turner Prize for Young People's Literature
- Patricia Wrightson Prize for Children's Literature
- NSW Multicultural Award (formerly Ethnic Affairs Commission Award, Community Relations Commission Award)
- UTS Glenda Adams Award for New Writing
- Nick Enright Prize for Playwriting (formerly the Play Award)
- Betty Roland Prize for Script Writing (formerly the separate Film, Television and Radio Writing Awards)
- NSW Premier's Prize for Literary Scholarship
- People's Choice Award
- Special Award
- NSW Premier's Translation Prize
- Multicultural NSW Early Career Translator Prize
- Indigenous Writers Prize
- Gleebooks Prize (currently inactive)

=== Christina Stead Prize for Fiction ===
The Christina Stead Prize is awarded for a work of fiction that may be either a novel or a collection of stories. The recipient receives a A$40,000 prize as of 2021. It is named in honour of Christina Stead, an Australian novelist and short-story writer. The first recipient was David Malouf, who was awarded the Prize for his novella An Imaginary Life in 1979. In 2019 Michelle de Kretser won with The Life to Come and equalled Peter Carey's record of three wins.

==== Award winners ====
Year	Title	Author	Publisher	Ref
1979	An Imaginary Life	David Malouf	Chatto and Windus, London	
1980	War Crimes	Peter Carey	University of Queensland Press	
1981	The Impersonators	Jessica Anderson	Macmillan	
1982	Bliss	Peter Carey	University of Queensland Press	
1983	The Cure	Peter Kocan	Angus & Robertson	
1984	Milk	Beverley Farmer	McPhee Gribble	
1985	Milk and Honey	Elizabeth Jolley	Fremantle Arts Centre Press	
1986	Postcards from Surfers	Helen Garner	McPhee Gribble	
1987	Dancing on Coral	Glenda Adams	Angus & Robertson	
1988	Final Things	John Sligo	Penguin Books Australia	
1989	Broken Words	Helen Hodgman	Penguin Books Australia	
1990	Reaching Tin River	Thea Astley	William Heinemann Australia	
1991	JF Was Here	Nigel Krauth	Allen & Unwin	
1992	The Death of Napoleon	Simon Leys	Allen & Unwin	
1993	Remembering Babylon	David Malouf	Random House Australia	
1994	Seasonal Adjustments	Adib Khan	Allen & Unwin	
1995	Just Like That	Lily Brett	Pan Macmillan	
1996	Leaning Towards Infinity	Sue Woolfe	Random House Australia	
1997	The Drowner	Robert Drewe	Pan Macmillan Australia	
1998	No award			
1999	Mr Darwin's Shooter	Roger McDonald	Random House Australia	
2000	The Salt of Broken Tears	Michael Meehan	Vintage Books/Random House Australia	
2001	Conditions of Faith	Alex Miller	Allen & Unwin	
2002	Dirt Music	Tim Winton	Pan Macmillan Australia	
2003	Moral Hazard	Kate Jennings	Picador	
2004	Shanghai Dancing	Brian Castro	Giramondo Publishing	
2005	The Turning	Tim Winton	Pan Macmillan Australia	
2006	The Secret River	Kate Grenville	Text Publishing	
2007	Theft: A Love Story	Peter Carey	Random House Australia	
2008	The Lost Dog	Michelle de Kretser	Allen & Unwin	
2009	The Good Parents	Joan London	Vintage Books	
2010	Summertime	J. M. Coetzee	Harvill Secker	
2011	Lovesong	Alex Miller	Allen & Unwin	
2012	That Deadman Dance	Kim Scott	Pan Macmillan Australia	
2013	Mateship with Birds	Carrie Tiffany	Pan Macmillan Australia	
2014	Questions of Travel	Michelle de Kretser	Allen & Unwin	
2015	The Snow Kimono	Mark Henshaw	Text Publishing	
2016	Locust Girl: A Lovesong	Merlinda Bobis	Spinifex Press	
2017	The Museum of Modern Love	Heather Rose	Allen & Unwin	
2018	The Book of Dirt	Bram Presser	Text Publishing	
2019	The Life to Come	Michelle de Kretser	Allen & Unwin	
2020	The Yield	Tara June Winch	Penguin Random House	
2021	A Room Made of Leaves	Kate Grenville	Text Publishing	
2022	Dark as Last Night	Tony Birch	University of Queensland Press	
2023	Women I Know	Katerina Gibson	Scribner	
2024	The Sitter	Angela O'Keeffe	University of Queensland Press	
2025	Highway 13	Fiona McFarlane	Allen & Unwin	
2026	The Immigrants	Moreno Giovannoni	Black Inc.	

=== Douglas Stewart Prize for Non-Fiction ===
The Douglas Stewart Prize is awarded for a prose work that is not fiction. The recipient receives a A$40,000 prize as of 2021. It is named in honour of Douglas Stewart, a noted Australian literary editor. The first recipient was Manning Clark, who was awarded the Prize for the fourth volume in his series A History of Australia in 1979. Drusilla Modjeska, with three wins, has won the Prize more than any other individual. In 2019 Billy Griffiths and Sarah Krasnostein were joint winners.

==== Award winners ====
Year	Title	Author	Publisher	Ref
1979	A History of Australia Volume IV	Manning Clark	Melbourne University Press	
1980	Barwick	David Marr	Allen & Unwin	
1981	A Fortunate Life	A. B. Facey	Fremantle Arts Centre Press	
1982	Rebels and Precursors	Richard Haese	Allen Lane	
1983	Robert J. Hawke	Blanche d'Alpuget	Schwartz Books	
1984	The Archibald Paradox	Sylvia Lawson	Allen Lane	
1985	The Moon Man	Elsie Webster	Melbourne University Press	
1986	A Paper Prince	George Munster	Viking/Penguin Books Australia	
1986	The Kurnai of Gippsland, Volume One	Phillip Pepper with Tess De Araugo	Hyland House Publishing	
1987	The Irish In Australia	Patrick O'Farrell	University of New South Wales Press	
1988	Louisa	Brian Matthews	McPhee Gribble	
1989	His Mother's Country	Maslyn Williams	Melbourne University Press	
1990	The Snowy	Siobhan McHugh	William Heinemann Australia	
1991	Sitting In	Barry Hill	William Heinemann Australia	
1991	Poppy	Drusilla Modjeska	McPhee Gribble	
1992	Patrick White : A Life	David Marr	Random Century Australia	
1993	Robert Menzies Forgotten People	Judith Brett	Pan Macmillan Australia	
1993	Put Your Whole Self In	Meme McDonald	Penguin Books Australia	
1994	Australia's Spies and Their Secrets	David McKnight	Allen & Unwin	
1994	The Scandalous Penton	Patrick Buckridge	University of Queensland Press	
1995	The Orchard	Drusilla Modjeska	Pan Macmillan Australia	
1996	Hunters and Collectors: The Antiquarian Imagination in Australia	Tom Griffiths	Cambridge University Press	
1997	The Europeans in Australia: A History, Volume One	Alan Atkinson	Oxford University Press	
1998	No award			
1999	H M Bark Endeavour	Ray Parkin	Miegunyah Press at Melbourne University Press	
2000	Stravinsky's Lunch	Drusilla Modjeska	Picador/Pan Macmillan Australia	
2001	Craft for a Dry Lake	Kim Mahood	Transworld/ Random House Australia	
2002	The Poison Principle	Gail Bell	Pan Macmillan Australia	
2003	Looking for Blackfellas' Point: An Australian History of Place	Mark McKenna	University of New South Wales Press	
2004	Dancing with Strangers	Inga Clendinnen	Text Publishing	
2005	The Idea of Home: autobiographical essays	John Hughes	Giramondo Publishing	
2006	East of Time	Jacob G. Rosenberg	Brandl & Schlesinger	
2007	Things I Didn't Know: a Memoir	Robert Hughes	Random House Australia	
2008	Slicing the Silence: Voyaging to Antarctica	Tom Griffiths	University of New South Wales Press	
2009	The Tall Man: Death and Life on Palm Island	Chloe Hooper	Penguin Australia	
2010	Kill Khalid: Mossad's failed hit ... and the rise of Hamas	Paul McGeough	Allen & Unwin	
2011	Malcolm Fraser: The Political Memoirs	Malcolm Fraser and Margaret Simons	Melbourne University Publishing	
2012	An Eye for Eternity: The Life of Manning Clark	Mark McKenna	Miegunyah, MUP	
2013	The Office: A Hard Working History	Gideon Haigh	Miegunyah	
2014	Boy, Lost: A Family Memoir	Kristina Olsson	University of Queensland Press	
2014	Rendezvous with Destiny	Michael Fullilove	Penguin Group (Australia)	
2015	The Bush	Don Watson	Penguin Books Australia	
2016	Reckoning: A Memoir	Magda Szubanski	Text Publishing	
2017	Our Man Elsewhere: In Search of Alan Moorehead	Thornton McCamish	Black Inc	
2018	Passchendaele: Requiem for Doomed Youth	Paul Ham	William Heinemann Australia	
2019	Deep Time Dreaming: Uncovering Ancient Australia (joint winner)	Billy Griffiths	Black Inc.	
2019	The Trauma Cleaner: One Woman's Extraordinary Life in Death, Decay and Disaster (joint winner)	Sarah Krasnostein	Text Publishing	
2020	Tiberius with a Telephone: The Life and Stories of William McMahon	Patrick Mullins	Scribe Publications	
2021	The Warrior, the Voyager, and the Artist: Three Lives in an Age of Empire	Kate Fullagar	Yale University Press	
2022	The Winter Road: A Story of Legacy, Land and a Killing at Croppa Creek	Kate Holden	Black Inc.	
2023	We Come With This Place	Debra Dank	Echo Publishing	
2024	Ghosts of the Orphanage	Christine Kenneally	Hachette Australia	
2025	Deep Water	James Bradley	Hamish Hamilton	
2026	Näku Dhäruk The Bark Petitions: How the People of Yirrkala Changed the Course of Australian Democracy	Clare Wright	Text Publishing	

=== Kenneth Slessor Prize for Poetry ===
The Kenneth Slessor Prize is awarded for a book of poetry, whether collected poems or a single poem of some length, and was first awarded in 1980. The recipient receives a A$30,000 prize as of 2021. It is named in honour of Kenneth Slessor, a noted Australian poet and journalist. The first recipient was David Campbell, who won the Prize posthumously. In 2011, NSW poet Jennifer Maiden became the only individual to win the award three times.

==== Award winners ====
Year	Title	Author	Publisher	Ref
1980	The Man in the Honeysuckle	David Campbell	Angus & Robertson	
1981	Astral Sea	Alan Gould	Angus & Robertson	
1982	Kaddish and Other Poems	Fay Zwicky	University of Queensland Press	
1983	Tide Country	Vivian Smith	Angus & Robertson	
1984	The People's Otherworld: Poems	Les A. Murray	Angus & Robertson	
1985	Your Shadow	Kevin Hart	Angus & Robertson	
1986	Selected Poems 1963–1983	Robert Gray	Angus & Robertson	
1987	Blood and Bone	Philip Hodgins	Angus & Robertson	
1988	The Domesticity of Giraffes	Judith Beveridge	Black Lightning Press	
1989	Under Berlin	John Tranter	University of Queensland Press	
1990	The Clean Dark	Robert Adamson	Paper Bark Press	
1991	The Winter Baby	Jennifer Maiden	Collins Angus & Robertson	
1992	Selected Poems	Elizabeth Riddell	Collins Angus & Robertson	
1993	Translations from the Natural World	Les A. Murray	Isabella Press	
1994	Ghosting William Buckley	Barry Hill	William Heinemann Australia	
1995	Coming Home From the World	Peter Boyle	Five Islands Press	
1996	Weeping for Lost Babylon	Eric Beach	HarperCollins Publishers	
1996	Selected Poems	J. S. Harry	Penguin Books Australia	
1997	The Viewfinder	Anthony Lawrence	University of Queensland Press	
1998	No award			
1999	Race Against Time	Lee Cataldi	Penguin Books Australia	
2000	Mines	Jennifer Maiden	Paper Bark Press / Australian Humanities Research Foundation	
2001	Africa	Ken Taylor	Five Islands Press	
2002	The Lovemakers	Alan Wearne	Penguin Books Australia	
2003	Screens Jets Heaven: New and Selected Poems	Jill Jones	Salt Publishing	
2004	Dear Deliria: New & Selected Poems	Pam Brown	Salt Publishing	
2005	Smoke Encrypted Whispers	Samuel Wagan Watson	University of Queensland Press	
2006	Latecomers	Jaya Savige	University of Queensland Press	
2007	Urban Myths:210 Poems	John Tranter	University of Queensland Press	
2008	Two Kinds of Silence	Kathryn Lomer	University of Queensland Press	
2009	Man Wolf Man	L. K. Holt	John Leonard Press	
2010	the sonnet according to ‘m’	Jordie Albiston	John Leonard Press	
2011	Pirate Rain	Jennifer Maiden	Giramondo Publishing	
2012	New and Selected Poems	Gig Ryan	Giramondo Publishing	
2013	Ruby Moonlight	Ali Cobby Eckermann	Magabala Books	
2014	Novelties	Fiona Hile	Hunter	
2015	Earth Hour	David Malouf	University of Queensland Press	
2016	brush	Joanne Burns	Giramondo Poets	
2017	Ghostspeaking	Peter Boyle	Vagabond Press	
2018	Argosy	Bella Li	Vagabond Press	
2019	Interval	Judith Bishop	University of Queensland Press	
2020	Enfolded in the Wings of a Great Darkness	Peter Boyle	Vagabond Press	
2021	Throat	Ellen van Neerven	University of Queensland Press	
2022	accelerations & inertias	Dan Disney	Vagabond Press	
2023	The Singer and Other Poems	Kim Cheng Boey	Cordite Books	
2024	Riverbed Sky Songs	Tais Rose Wae	Vagabond Press	
2025	rock flight	Hasib Hourani	Giramondo	
2026	How to Emerge	Jill Jones	Vagabond Press	

=== Ethel Turner Prize for Young People's Literature ===
The Ethel Turner Prize is awarded for work of fiction, non-fiction or poetry written for young people of secondary school level. The recipient receives a A$30,000 prize as of 2021. It is named in honour of Ethel Turner, author of the children's classic, Seven Little Australians.

The Children's Literature section of the Premier's Literary Awards began as a single award in 1979, but was redefined in 1999 to create the Patricia Wrightson Prize (for writing for a primary school audience) and the Ethel Turner Prize (for a secondary school audience). The Ethel Turner Award was also given to all previous winners in the Children's Literature section. The Prize was first won, jointly, by Patricia Wrightson and Jenny Wagner in 1979. Australian author Ursula Dubosarsky and writer Jaclyn Moriarty have each won the prize three times.

==== Award winners ====
Year	Title	Author	Publisher	Ref
1979	John Brown, Rose and the Midnight Cat	Jenny Wagner	Kestrel Books	
	The Dark Bright Water	Patricia Wrightson (Special Children's book)	Atheneum Books, New York	
1980	Mr Archimedes' Bath	Pamela Allen	William Collins	
	Land of the Rainbow Snake	Catherine Berndt (Special Children's book)	William Collins	
1981	When the Wind Changed	Ruth Park and Deborah Niland	William Collins	
	Seventh Pebble	Eleanor Spence	Oxford University Press	
1982	Whistle Up the Chimney	Nan Hunt and Craig Smith	William Collins	
1983	Who Sank the Boat?	Pamela Allen	Nelson	
	Five Times Dizzy	Nadia Wheatley (Special children's book)	Oxford University Press	
1984	Possum Magic	Mem Fox and Julie Vivas	Omnibus Books	
1985	The House That was Eureka	Nadia Wheatley	Viking/Kestrel	
1986	The True Story of Spit MacPhee	James Aldridge	Viking/Penguin Books Australia	
1987	A Rabbit Named Harris	Nan Hunt and Betina Ogden	William Collins	
1988	Answers to Brut	Gillian Rubinstein	Omnibus Books	
1989	You Take the High Road	Mary Pershall	Penguin Books Australia	
1990	The Blue Chameleon	Katherine Scholes	Hill of Content Publishing	
1991	Strange Objects	Gary Crew	William Heinemann Australia	
1992	All in the Blue Unclouded Weather	Robin Klein	Penguin Books Australia	
1993	Tjarany Roughtail	Gracie Greene, Lucille Gill and Joe Tramacchi	Magabala Books	
1994	The White Guinea Pig	Ursula Dubosarsky	Penguin Books Australia	
1995	Mr Enigmatic	Jenny Pausacker	Reed for Kids	
1996	Johnny Hart's Heroes	David Metzenthen	Penguin Books Australia	
1997	The Two Bullies	Junko Morimoto	Random House Australia	
1998	No award			
1999	The Divine Wind	Garry Disher	Hodder Headline Australia	
2000	The Binna-Binna Man	Meme McDonald and Boori Monty Pryor	Allen & Unwin	
2001	Feeling Sorry for Celia	Jaclyn Moriarty	Pan Macmillan Australia	
2002	Soldier Boy: The True Story of Jim Martin, the Youngest Anzac	Anthony Hill	Penguin Books Australia	
2003	The Messenger	Markus Zusak	Pan Macmillan Australia	
2004	Boys of Blood and Bone	David Metzenthen	Penguin Books Australia	
2005	By the River	Steven Herrick	Allen & Unwin	
2006	Theodora's Gift	Ursula Dubosarsky	Penguin Group Australia	
2007	The Red Shoe	Ursula Dubosarsky	Allen & Unwin	
2008	Town	James Roy	University of Queensland Press	
2009	A Brief History of Montmaray	Michelle Cooper	Random House Australia	
2010	When the Hipchicks Went to War	Pamela Rushby	Hachette Australia	
2011	Graffiti Moon	Cath Crowley	Pan Macmillan Australia	
2012	Only Ever Always	Penni Russon	Allen & Unwin	
2013	A Corner of White	Jaclyn Moriarty	Pan Macmillan Australia	
2014	Zac and Mia	AJ Betts	Text Press	
2015	The Cracks in the Kingdom	Jaclyn Moriarty	Pan Macmillan Australia	
2016	Laurinda	Alice Pung	Black Inc.	
2017	One Thousand Hills	James Roy and Noël Zihabamwe	Omnibus Books, Scholastic Australia	
2018	The Ones That Disappeared	Zana Fraillon	Lothian	
2019	Amelia Westlake	Erin Gough	Hardie Grant Egmont	
2020	Lenny's Book of Everything	Karen Foxlee	Allen & Unwin	
2021	The End of the World Is Bigger than Love	Davina Bell	Text Publishing	
2022	The Gaps	Leanne Hall	Text Publishing	
2023	The Upwelling	Lystra Rose	Hachette	
2024	The Quiet and the Loud	Helena Fox	Pan Macmillan Australia	
2025	Anomaly	Emma Lord	Affirm Press	
2026	Desert Tracks	Marly Wells and Linda Wells	Magabala Books	

=== Patricia Wrightson Prize for Children's Literature ===
The Patricia Wrightson Prize is awarded for work of fiction, non-fiction or poetry written for children up to secondary school level. The recipient receives a A$30,000 prize as of 2021.

The Children's Literature section of the Premier's Literary Awards began as a single award in 1979, but was redefined in 1999 to create the Patricia Wrightson Prize (for writing for a primary school audience) and the Ethel Turner Prize (for a secondary school audience). The Patricia Wrightson Prize was created in honour of children's author Patricia Wrightson, who won the first Ethel Turner Prize in 1979. The first recipient was Odo Hirsch, for his debut children's book, Antonio S and the Mystery of Theodore Guzman. The most recent recipient is Leanne Hall, author of Iris and the Tiger. Kierin Meehan is the only author who has won the Prize more than once.

==== Award winners ====
Year	Title	Author	Publisher	Ref
1999	Antonio S and the Mystery of Theodore Guzman	Odo Hirsch	Allen & Unwin	
2000	The Spangled Drongo	Steven Herrick	University of Queensland Press	
2001	Fox	Margaret Wild and Ron Brooks (illus.)	Allen & Unwin	
2002	The Red Tree	Shaun Tan	Lothian Books	
2003	Where in the World	Simon French	Little Hare Books	
2004	Night Singing	Kierin Meehan	Penguin Books Australia	
2005	Farm Kid	Sherryl Clark	Penguin Books Australia	
2006	In the Monkey Forest	Kierin Meehan	Penguin Books Australia	
2007	Home	Narelle Oliver	Omnibus Books	
2008	The Peasant Prince	Li Cunxin and Anne Spudvilas (illus.)	Penguin Books Australia	
2009	The Word Spy	Ursula Dubosarsky and Tohby Riddle	Penguin Books Australia	
2010	Krakatoa Lighthouse	Allan Baillie	Penguin Books Australia	
2011	My Australian Story: The Hunt for Ned Kelly	Sophie Masson	Scholastic Australia	
2012	Crow Country	Kate Constable	Allen & Unwin	
2013	The Ghost of Miss Annabel Spoon	Aaron Blabey	Penguin Books Australia	
2014	The Girl Who Brought Mischief	Katrina Nannestad	HarperCollins Publishers	
2015	Crossing	Catherine Norton	Omnibus/Scholastic Australia	
2015	Figgy in the World	Tamsin Janu	Omnibus/Scholastic Australia	
2016	Teacup	Rebecca Young & Matt Ottley	Scholastic Australia	
2017	Iris and the Tiger	Leanne Hall	Text Publishing	
2018	How to Bee	Bren MacDibble	Allen & Unwin	
2019	Leave Taking	Lorraine Marwood	University of Queensland Press	
2019	Dingo	Claire Saxby and Tannya Harricks	Walker Books	
2020	Ella and the Ocean	Lian Tanner & Jonathan Bentley	Allen & Unwin	
2021	The Grandest Bookshop in the World	Amelia Mellor	Affirm Press	
2022	My Brother Ben	Peter Carnavas	University of Queensland Press	
2023	The First Scientists	Corey Tutt and Blak Douglas	Hardie Grant	
2024	Paradise Sands: A Story of Enchantment	Levi Pinfold	Walker Books	
2025	Silver Linings	Katrina Nannestad	HarperCollins	
2026	Gone	Michel Streich	Thames & Hudson	

=== NSW Multicultural Award ===
This Award was first established in 1980, when it was known as the Ethnic Affairs Commission Award. Later known as the Community Relations Commission Award, and from 2012 referred to as the Community Relations Commission for Multicultural NSW Award, or from 2014 just Multicultural NSW Award, the prize money is worth $20,000 as of 2021.

It is offered for: "a book of fiction or non-fiction, memoir or history; a play, musical drama or comedy, theatrical monologue or other theatrical performance; a book of collected poems or a single poem of substantial length published in book form; the screenplay of a feature or documentary film or episode of a television program...; or the script of a radio play or documentary which is deemed by the judges to have made a significant contribution to Australian literature, poetry, theatre, film, radio or television and which also considers any aspect of the Australian migration experience; and/or aspects of cultural diversity and multiculturalism in Australian society."

==== Award winners ====
Year	Title	Author	Publisher	Ref
1980	Australia through Italian Eyes	Stephanie Lindsay Thompson	Oxford University Press	
1981	For the Patriarch	Angelo Loukakis	University of Queensland Press	
1982	The Long Farewell	Don Charlwood	Allen Lane	
1983	Faith of Our Fathers	Spiro Zavos	University of Queensland Press	
1984	A Universe of Clowns	Serge Liberman	Phoenix Publications	
1985	Oh Lucky Country	Rosa Cappiello	University of Queensland Press	
1986	No Snow In December	Maria Lewitt	Heinemann Publishers	
1987	Dreamtime Nightmares	Bill Rosser	Penguin Books Australia	
1991	Jewels and Ashes	Arnold Zable	Scribe Publications	
1992	Inside Outside	Andrew Riemer	HarperCollins Angus & Robertson	
1993	The Crocodile Fury	Beth Yahp	HarperCollins Angus & Robertson	
1994	Aphrodite and the Others	Gillian Bouras	McPhee Gribble	
1995	The First Book of Samuel	Ursula Dubosarsky	Penguin Books Australia	
1996	Caravanserai	Hanifa Deen	Allen & Unwin	
1997	The Fiftieth Gate	Mark Raphael Baker	HarperCollins Australia	
1998	Not awarded			
1999	Mortal Divide: the Autobiography of Yiorgos Alexandroglou	George Alexander	Brandl & Schlesinger	
2000	The Binna-Binna Man	Meme McDonald and Boori Monty Pryor	Allen & Unwin	
2001	Rabbit-Proof Fence	Christine Olsen	Jabal Films	
2002	Visits Home: Migration Experiences between Italy and Australia	Loretta Baldassar	Melbourne University Press	
2003	Secrets and Spies: The Harbin Files	Mara Moustafine	Random House Australia	
2004	Against Paranoid Nationalism: Searching for Hope in a Shrinking Society	Ghassan Hage	Pluto Press Australia	
2005	A Certain Maritime Incident: the sinking of SIEV X	Tony Kevin	Scribe Publications	
2006	The Secret River	Kate Grenville	Text Publishing	
2007	The Arrival	Shaun Tan	Hachette Australia	
2008	Sunrise West	Jacob G. Rosenberg	Brandl & Schlesinger	
2009	Destination Australia: migration to Australia since 1901	Eric Richards	UNSW Press	
2010	Leave to Remain: A Memoir	Abbas El-Zein	Penguin Books Australia	
2011	The English Class	Ouyang Yu	Transit Lounge Publishing	
2012	Good Living Street: The Fortunes of My Viennese Family	Tim Bonyhady	Allen & Unwin	
2013	Don't Go Back to Where You Came From	Tim Soutphommasane	NewSouth	
2014	Questions of Travel	Michelle de Kretser	Allen & Unwin	
2014	The Secret River	Andrew Bovell	Currency Press	
2015	Black and Proud: The story of an AFL photo	Matthew Klugman and Gary Osmond	NewSouth	
2016	Good Muslim Boy	Osamah Sami	Hardie Grant	
2017	The Hate Race	Maxine Beneba Clarke	Hachette Australia	
2018	The Permanent Resident	Roanna Gonsalves	UWA	
2019	The Lebs	Michael Mohammed Ahmad	Hachette Australia	
2020	The Pillars	Peter Polites	Hachette Australia	
2021	Throat	Ellen van Neerven	University of Queensland Press	
2022	Still Alive: Notes from Australia's Immigration Detention System	Safdar Ahmed	Twelve Panels Press	
2023	The Eulogy	Jackie Bailey	Hardie Grant	
2024	Stay for Dinner	Sandhya Parappukkaran, illustrated by Michelle Pereira	Hardie Grant	
2025	36 Ways of Writing a Vietnamese Poem	Nam Le	Scribner	
2026	Gather Up Your World in One Long Breath	S Shakthidharan	Powerhouse Publishing	

=== UTS Glenda Adams Award for New Writing ===
The UTS Glenda Adams Award for New Writing (originally the UTS Award for New Writing) is given for a published book of fiction by an author who has not previously published a work of fiction that is book-length. It was established in 2005, and the winner receives a A$5,000 prize as of 2021. from the University of Technology, Sydney.

The award was renamed in 2008 to honour Glenda Adams, the Australian novelist and short story writer who died in 2007.

==== Award winners ====
Year	Title	Author	Publisher	Ref
2005	The Last Ride	Denise Young	HarperCollins Australia	
2006	An Accidental Terrorist	Steven Lang	University of Queensland Press	
2007	Swallow the Air	Tara June Winch	University of Queensland Press	
2009	Feather Man	Rhyll McMaster	Brandl & Schlesinger	
2009	The Boat	Nam Le	Penguin Books Australia	
2010	Document Z	Andrew Croome	Allen & Unwin	
2011	Traitor	Stephen Daisley	Text Publishing	
2012	The Roving Party	Rohan Wilson	Allen & Unwin	
2013	The Last Thread	Michael Sala	Affirm Press	
2014	The Night Guest	Fiona McFarlane	Penguin Group (Australia)	
2015	An Elegant Young Man	Luke Carman	Giramondo Publishing	
2016	An Astronaut’s Life	Sonja Dechian	Text Publishing	
2017	Letter to Pessoa	Michelle Cahill	Giramondo Publishing	
2018	The Book of Dirt	Bram Presser	Text Publishing	
2019	Boy Swallows Universe	Trent Dalton	HarperCollins	
2020	Real Differences	S L Lim	Transit Lounge	
2021	Cherry Beach	Laura McPhee-Browne	Text Publishing	
2022	Hold Your Fire	Chloe WIlson	Scribner	
2023	We Come With This Place	Debra Dank	Echo Publishing	
2024	Anam	André Dao	Penguin Random House	
2025	Jilya	Tracy Westerman	University of Queensland Press	
2026	Find Me at the Jaffa Gate: An Encyclopaedia of a Palestinian Family	Micaela Sahhar	NewSouth Publishing	

=== Nick Enright Prize for Playwriting ===
The Play Award, established in 1983, is given to a play or musical which has been produced in Australia. The winner is chosen based purely on the merit of the written text, and they receive a A$30,000 prize as of 2021. The award was first given to playwright Nicholas Enright and composer Terence Clarke for the musical Variations. Writers Daniel Keene and Stephen Sewell have each won the Award three times.

In 2010, the judges decided not to shortlist any plays for the Award, instead bestowing a $30,000 grant for new playwrights. Their decision was widely criticised by many of Australia's most experienced playwrights. Gil Appleton, head of the judging panel, called for all future judges to see a performance of the play rather than judging the work on the script alone.

==== Award winners ====
Year	Title	Author	Ref
1983	Variations	Nicholas Enright and Terence Clarke	
1984	Down an Alley Filled with Cats	Warwick Moss	
1985	The Blind Giant is Dancing	Stephen Sewell	
1986	Away	Michael Gow	
1987	Blood Relations	David Malouf	
1988	The Rivers of China	Alma De Groen	
1989	Hate	Stephen Sewell	
1990	Not awarded		
1991	Hotel Sorrento	Hannie Rayson	
1992	Cosi	Louis Nowra	
1993	Dead Heart	Nicholas Parsons	
1994	Sex Diary of an Infidel	Michael Gurr	
1995	Sweet Phoebe	Michael Gow	
	Falling From Grace	Hannie Rayson	
1996	The Shoe-Horn Sonata	John Misto	
1997	Jerusalem	Michael Gurr	
1998	Not awarded		
1999	Box the Pony	Scott Rankin and Leah Purcell	
2000	Scissors, Paper, Rock	Daniel Keene	
2001	Milo's Wake	Margery Forde and Michael Forde	
2002	Miss Tanaka	John Romeril	
2003	Half & Half	Daniel Keene	
2004	Myth, Propaganda and Disaster in Nazi Germany and Contemporary America	Stephen Sewell	
2005	Harbour	Katherine Thomson	
2006	Strangers in Between	Tommy Murphy	
2007	Holding the Man	Tommy Murphy, adapted from the book by Timothy Conigrave	
2008	Stories in the Dark	Debra Oswald	
2009	The Serpent's Teeth	Daniel Keene	
2011	Do Not Go Gentle	Patricia Cornelius	
2012	Porn, Cake	Vanessa Bates	
2012	The Gift	Joanna Murray-Smith	
2013	The Damned	Reg Cribb	
2014	Muff	Van Badham	
2015	Black Diggers	Tom Wright	
2016	The Bleeding Tree	Angus Cerini	
2017	The Drover's Wife	Leah Purcell	
2018	Black is the New White	Nakkiah Lui	
2019	The Almighty Sometimes	Kendall Feaver	
2020	Counting and Cracking	S. Shakthidharan	
2021	Milk	Dylan Van Den Berg	
2022	Orange Thrower	Kristy Marillier	
2023	Whitefella Yella Tree	Dylan Van Den Berg	
2024	Sex Magick	Nicholas Brown	
2025	Three Magpies Perched in a Tree	Glenn Shea	
2026	The Black Woman of Gippsland	Andrea James	

=== Betty Roland Prize for Script Writing ===
In 1984, the Film Writing Award and the Television Writing Award were established, followed by the Radio Writing Award in 1988. In 1990, these three awards were amalgamated into the Script Writing Award. It is given for the script of a film, radio program or television program, which may be fiction or a documentary. The winner is chosen based purely on the merit of the written text, and they receive a A$30,000 prize as of 2021. The award was first given jointly to the film scripts for Sweetie and An Angel at My Table. Directors Jane Campion and Rolf de Heer have each won the Award twice.

==== Award winners ====
Year	Title	Author	Ref
1984	Careful, He Might Hear You (Film Writing Award)	Michael Jenkins	
	Scales of Justice (Television Writing Award)	Robert Caswell	
1985	My First Wife (Film Writing Award)	Bob Ellis and Paul Cox	
	The Cowra Breakout (Television Writing Award)	Margaret Kelly, Chris Noonan, Phillip Noyce and Russell Braddon	
1986	Bliss (Film Writing Award)	Peter Carey and Ray Lawrence	
1987	Malcolm (Film Writing Award)	David Parker	
	Two Friends (Television Writing Award)	Helen Garner	
1988	High Tide (Film Writing Award)	Laura Jones	
	Australia-Japan: A Love Story (Radio Writing Award)	Keith Gallasch and Virginia Baxter	
	Olive (Television Writing Award)	Anthony Wheeler	
1989	The Story of Anger Lee Bredenza (Radio Writing Award)	Alana Valentine	
	The True Believers (Television Writing Award)	Bob Ellis and Stephen Ramsay	
1990	Sweetie	Jane Campion and Gerard Lee	
	An Angel at My Table	Laura Jones	
1991	Not awarded		
1992	Dingo	Marc Rosenberg	
1993	Strictly Ballroom	Baz Luhrmann and Craig Pearce	
1994	Bad Boy Bubby	Rolf de Heer	
1995	"Playing the Ego Card", Frontline	Jane Kennedy, Santo Cilauro, Tom Gleisner and Rob Sitch	
1996	Blue Murder	Ian David	
1997	Mabo: Life of an Island Man	Trevor Graham	
1998	Not awarded		
1999	Dance Me to My Song	Heather Rose, Frederick Stahl and Rolf de Heer	
2000	Looking for Alibrandi	Melina Marchetta	
2001	Rabbit-Proof Fence	Christine Olsen	
2002	My Mother India	Safina Uberoi	
2003	Till Human Voices Wake Us	Michael Petroni	
2004	Marking Time	John Doyle	
2005	The Art of War	Betty Churcher	
2006	We Can Be Heroes: Finding The Australian of the Year	Chris Lilley	
2007	The Home Song Stories	Tony Ayres	
2008	Forbidden Lie$	Anna Broinowski	
2009	First Australians	Louis Nowra, Rachel Perkins & Beck Cole	
2010	Bright Star	Jane Campion	
	Fairweather Man	Aviva Ziegler	
2011	Offspring	Debra Oswald	
2012	Rake (Episode 1): R v Murray	Peter Duncan	
2013	Dead Europe	Louise Fox	
2014	Devil's Dust (two-part series, ABC1)	Kris Mrksa	
2015	The Babadook	Jennifer Kent	
2016	Deadline Gallipoli, Episode 4: 'The Letter'	Cate Shortland	
2017	The Code, Series 2 Episode 4	Shelley Birse (joint winner)	
2017	Down Under	Abe Forsythe (joint winner)	
2018	Deep Water: The Real Story	Amanda Blue and Jacob Hickey (joint winners)	
2018	Top of the Lake: China Girl, "Birthday" Series 2 Episode 4	Jane Campion and Gerard Lee (joint winners)	
2019	Jirga	Benjamin Gilmour	
2020	Missing	Kylie Boltin (joint winner)	
2020	The Cry, Episode 2	Jacquelin Perske (joint winner)	
2021	Freeman	Laurence Billiet	
2022	NITRAM	Shaun Grant	
2023	Blaze	Del Kathryn Barton and Huna Amweero	
2024	Safe Home, Episode 1	Anna Barnes	
2025	Inside	Charles Williams	
2026	The Narrow Road to the Deep North, Episode 4	Shaun Grant	

=== NSW Premier's Prize for Literary Scholarship ===
Awarded biennially, the Prize for Literary Scholarship was made to a book, CD-ROM or DVD which presents an original perspective on one or more published works. The winner received a A$30,000 prize. It was discontinued and has not been awarded since 2010.

==== Award winners ====
Year	Title	Author
2004	Broken Song: T.G.H. Strehlow and Aboriginal Possession	Barry Hill
2006	Postcolonial Conrad: Paradoxes of Empire	Terry Collits
2008	Samuel Taylor Coleridge: a Literary Life	William Christie
2010	Networked Language: Culture and History in Australian Poetry	Philip Mead

=== People's Choice Award ===
This award was established in 2009 to commemorate the 30th anniversary of the awards. The Award is based on votes by New South Wales residents from the works shortlisted for the Christina Stead Prize for fiction. The award was first won by Steve Toltz for his novel, A Fraction of the Whole.

==== Award winners ====
Year	Title	Author	Ref
2009	A Fraction of the Whole	Steve Toltz	
2010	The World Beneath	Cate Kennedy	
2011	Lovesong	Alex Miller	
2012	Five Bells	Gail Jones	
2013	Animal People	Charlotte Wood	
2014	The Railwayman's Wife	Ashley Hay	
2015	Only the Animals (joint winner)	Ceridwen Dovey	
2015	The Godlen Age (joint winner)	Joan London	
2016	The Life of Houses	Lisa Gorton	
2017	Vancouver #3 in the series Wisdom Tree	Nick Earls	
2018	The Book of Dirt	Bram Presser	
2019	Boy Swallows Universe	Trent Dalton	
2020	The Yield	Tara June Winch	
2021	The Dictionary of Lost Words	Pip Williams	
2022	The Shut Ins	Katherine Brabon	
2023	Every Version of You	Grace Chan	
2024	The God of No Good	Sita Walker	
2025	The Lasting Harm	Lucia Osborn-Crowley	
2026	Rapture	Emily Maguire	

=== Book of the Year ===
The winner of the New South Wales Book of the Year is chosen from among the winners of that year's awards, with the award worth an extra A$10,000 as of 2021.

==== Award winners ====
Year	Title	Author	Other Award	Ref
1992	Selected Poems	Elizabeth Riddell	Kenneth Slessor Prize for Poetry	
1993	Tjarany Roughtail	Gracie Green, Lucille Gill and Joe Tramacchi	Ethel Turner Prize for Young People's Literature	
1994	Seasonal Adjustments	Adib Khan	Christina Stead Prize for Fiction	
1995	The Encyclopaedia of Aboriginal Australia	David Horton	Special Award	
1996	Hunters and Collectors: The Antiquarian Imagination in Australia	Tom Griffiths	Douglas Stewart Prize for Non-Fiction	
1997	The Drowner	Robert Drewe	Christina Stead Prize for Fiction	
1999	H M Bark Endeavour	Ray Parkin	Douglas Stewart Prize for Non-Fiction	
2000	The Binna-Binna Man	Meme McDonald and Boori Monty Pryor	Ethel Turner Prize for Young People's Literature	
2001	Broken Circles: Fragmenting Indigenous Families 1800-2000	Anna Haebich	Gleebooks Prize	
2002	The Lovemakers	Alan Wearne	Kenneth Slessor Prize for Poetry	
2003	Looking for Blackfellas' Point: An Australian History of Place	Mark McKenna	Douglas Stewart Prize for Non-Fiction	
2004	Shanghai Dancing	Brian Castro	Christina Stead Prize for Fiction	
2005	Smoke Encrypted Whispers	Samuel Wagan Watson	Kenneth Slessor Prize for Poetry	
2006	The Weather Makers	Tim Flannery	Gleebooks Prize for Critical Writing	
2007	The Arrival	Shaun Tan	Community Relations Commission Award	
2008	The Lost Dog	Michelle de Kretser	Christina Stead Prize for Fiction	
2009	The Boat	Nam Le	UTS Glenda Adams Award for New Writing	
2010	Kill Khalid: Mossad's failed hit ... and the rise of Hamas	Paul McGeough	Douglas Stewart Prize for Non-Fiction	
2011	Malcolm Fraser: The Political Memoirs	Malcolm Fraser and Margaret Simons	Douglas Stewart Prize for Non-Fiction	
2012	That Deadman Dance	Kim Scott	Christina Stead Prize for Fiction	
2013	Ruby Moonlight	Ali Cobby Eckermann	Kenneth Slessor Prize for Poetry	
2014	Questions of Travel	Michelle de Kretser	Christina Stead Prize for Fiction	
2015	The Bush	Don Watson	Douglas Stewart Prize for Non-Fiction	
2016	Dark Emu	Bruce Pascoe	Indigenous Writers Prize	
2017	The Drover's Wife	Leah Purcell	Nick Enright Prize for Playwriting	
2018	Taboo	Kim Scott	Indigenous Writers Prize	
2019	Deep Time Dreaming: Uncovering Ancient Australia	Billy Griffiths	Douglas Stewart Prize for Non-Fiction	
2020	The Yield	Tara June Winch	Christina Stead Prize for Fiction	
2021	Throat	Ellen van Neerven	Kenneth Slessor Prize for Poetry	
2022	Still Alive: Notes from Australia’s Immigration Detention System	Safdar Ahmed	Twelve Panels Press	
2023	We Come With This Place	Debra Dank	Douglas Stewart Prize for Non-Fiction	
2024	She is the Earth	Ali Cobby Eckermann	Indigenous Writers' Prize	
2025	36 Ways of Writing a Vietnamese Poem	Nam Le	Kenneth Slessor Prize for Poetry	
2026	Näku Dhäruk The Bark Petitions: How the People of Yirrkala Changed the Course of Australian Democracy	Clare Wright	Douglas Stewart Prize for Non-Fiction	

=== Special Award ===
The Special Award can be proposed by the judges for a work that doesn't easily fit into the existing prizes, or as a general recognition of a writer's achievements. The winner received a A$10,000 prize as of 2021.

==== Award winners ====
Year	Recipient	Ref
1982	Christina Stead	
1984	Marjorie Barnard	
1985	Grace Perry	
1986	William H. Wilde, Joy Hooton, Barry Andrews for The Oxford Companion to Australian Literature, Oxford University Press	
1987	Glenda Adams for Dancing on Coral, Angus & Robertson	
1988	Patricia Wrightson	
1989	A.D. Hope	
1990	Bruce Beaver	
1991	Bill Neskovski, Judith Wright	
1992	Ronald McCuaig	
1993	Mudrooroo Nyoongah	
1994	Dal Stivens	
1995	David Horton for The Encyclopaedia of Aboriginal Australia, Aboriginal Studies Press	
1996	Thomas Shapcott	
1997	Colin Thiele	
1999	Leslie Rees	
2000	Dorothy Hewett	
2001	Ron Pretty	
2002	Thea Astley	
2003	Nick Enright	
2004	Ruth Park	
2005	Ruby Langford Ginibi	
2006	Rosemary Dobson	
2007	Gerald Murnane	
2008	Tom Keneally	
2009	Katharine Brisbane AM	
2010	The Macquarie PEN Anthology of Australian Literature	
2011	Libby Gleeson	
2012	Clive James	
2013	David Ireland AM	
2014	Rodney Hall OAM	
2015	David Williamson AO	
2016	Dr Rosie Scott AM	
2017	Not awarded	
2018	Not awarded	
2019	Behrouz Boochani for No Friend But the Mountains: Writing from Manus Prison	
2020	Not awarded	
2021	Melina Marchetta	
2022	Not awarded	
2023	Bankstown Poetry Slam	
2025	Liminal	
2026		

=== NSW Premier's Translation Prize ===
Awarded biennially, the Translation Prize is offered to Australian translators who translate works into English from other languages. The winner receives a A$30,000 prize as of 2021. It will next be awarded in 2027.

==== Award winners ====
Year	Recipient
2001	Mabel Lee
2003	Julie Rose
2005	Chris Andrews
2007	John Nieuwenhuizen
2009	David Colmer
2011	Ian Johnston
2013	Peter Boyle
2015	Brian Nelson
2017	Royall Tyler
2019	Alison Entrekin
2021	Alice Whitmore
2021	Nick Trakakis
2023	Tiffany Tsao
2025	Elizabeth Bryer

=== Multicultural NSW Early Career Translator Prize ===
The Multicultural NSW Early Career Translator Prize was established in 2015. It is sponsored by Multicultural NSW and the winner currently receives a A$5,000 prize. The award acknowledges translators in the first ten years of their practice.

==== Award winners ====
Year	Recipient	Ref
2015	Lilit Zekulin Thwaites	
2017	Jan Owen	
2022	Safdar Ahmed	

=== Indigenous Writers' Prize ===
The inaugural Indigenous Writers' Prize was awarded in 2016. The prize is offered biennially and the winner receives a A$30,000 prize. The prize is intended to acknowledge the contribution made to Australian literary culture by Aboriginal and Torres Strait Islander writers. The first award was shared by joint winners, Bruce Pascoe for his book Dark Emu and Ellen van Neerven for Heat and Light.

==== Award winners ====
Year	Title	Author	Publisher	Ref
2016	Dark Emu (joint winner)	Bruce Pascoe	Magabala Books	
2016	Heat and Light (joint winner)	Ellen van Neerven	University of Queensland Press	
2018	Taboo	Kim Scott	Text Publishing	
2020	The White Girl	Tony Birch	University of Queensland Press	
2022	Bila Yarrudhanggalangdhuray: River of Dreams	Anita Heiss	Simon & Schuster	
2023	We Come With This Place	Debra Dank	Echo Publishing	
2024	She Is the Earth	Ali Cobby Eckermann	Magabala Books	
2025	When the World Was Soft	Juluwarlu Group Aboriginal Corporation	Allen & Unwin	
2026				

=== Gleebooks Prize for Critical Writing ===
The Gleebooks Prize was established in 1995 and was offered for Australian critical writing. The winner received a A$10,000 prize. It was last awarded in 2009 to David Love and its current status is unknown.

==== Award winners ====
Year	Title	Author	Publisher	Ref
1995	Volatile Bodies, Towards a Corporeal Feminism	Elizabeth Grosz		
1996	Artful Histories: Modern Australian Autobiography	David McCooey	Cambridge University Press	
1997	Love and Freedom: Professional Women and the Reshaping of Personal Life	Alison Mackinnon		
1999	Ngarrindjeri Wurruwarrin: A World that Is, Was and Will Be	Diane Bell		
2000	Reading the Holocaust	Inga Clendinnen		
2001	Broken Circles: Fragmenting Indigenous Families 1800-2000	Anna Haebich		
2002	Borderline: Australia's treatment of refugees and asylum seekers	Peter Mares		
2003	How Simone de Beauvoir Died in Australia	Sylvia Lawson		
2004	The Artificial Horizon: Imagining the Blue Mountains	Martin Thomas		
2005	Blackfellas Whitefellas and the Hidden Injuries of Race	Gillian Cowlishaw		
2006	The Weather Makers: the History and Future Impact of Climate Change	Tim Flannery	Text Publishing	
2007	Asbestos House: the Secret History of James Hardie Industries	Gideon Haigh		
2008	Race and the Crisis of Humanism	Kay Anderson		
2009	Unfinished Business: Paul Keating's interrupted revolution	David Love	Scribe Publications	

== See also ==
- New South Wales Premier's History Awards
- List of Australian literary awards
