= LEB =

LEB or Leb may refer to:

- Lausanne–Echallens–Bercher railway, Switzerland
- Lea Bridge railway station, London, England (National Rail station code)
- Lebanon, UNDP country code
- Lebanon Municipal Airport (New Hampshire) (FAA identifier)
- Lexham English Bible
- Life expectancy at birth
- Liga Española de Baloncesto, Spanish basketball league
- London Electricity Board, UK
- FBI Law Enforcement Bulletin
- Leb, slang for a Lebanese Australian

== See also ==
- The Lebs, 2018 comic novel by Michael Mohammed Ahmad
