= Questions of Travel =

Book by Michelle de Kretser

- First edition
- Author: Michelle de Kretser
- Language: English
- Genre: Literary
- Publisher: Allen and Unwin, Australia
- Publication date: 2012
- Publication place: Australia
- Media type: Print (Paperback)
- Pages: 517 pp
- ISBN: 9781743311004
- Preceded by: The Lost Dog
- Followed by: Springtime

Questions of Travel is a 2012 novel by Australian author Michelle de Kretser. It won the 2013 Miles Franklin Award and the 2013 Prime Minister's Literary Award for Fiction.

== Description ==
The novel concerns two main characters: Laura—an Australian woman who travels the world before returning to Sydney to work for a publisher of travel guides—and Ravi—an IT professional from Sri Lanka who flees his country after a major trauma. The novel "illuminates travel, work and modern dreams in this brilliant evocation of the way we live now."

Owen Richardson, in his review of the novel in The Monthly described it as "...a big, ambitious novel of Sydney and the world, globalisation and divided identities. It is everywhere full of intelligence and a vivid sense of individual lives."

The novel's title, Questions of Travel, is a homage to a poem of the same name by Elizabeth Bishop.

== Awards ==
- 2012 winner Western Australian Premier's Book Awards — Premier's Prize
- 2012 winner Western Australian Premier's Book Awards — Fiction
- 2013 shortlisted Australian Book Industry Awards (ABIA) — Australian Literary Fiction Book of the Year
- 2013 winner ALS Gold Medal
- 2013 shortlisted Indie Book Awards — Fiction
- 2013 winner Miles Franklin Award
- 2013 shortlisted Nita Kibble Literary Awards — Nita Kibble Literary Award
- 2013 winner Prime Minister's Literary Awards — Fiction
- 2013 shortlisted Stella Prize
- 2014 shortlisted Adelaide Festival Awards for Literature — Award for Fiction
- 2014 shortlisted International Dublin Literary Award
- 2014 winner New South Wales Premier's Literary Awards — Book of the Year
- 2014 joint winner New South Wales Premier's Literary Awards — Community Relations Commission Award With Andrew Bovell's stage adaptation of The Secret River
- 2014 winner New South Wales Premier's Literary Awards — Christina Stead Prize for Fiction
- 2014 shortlisted Victorian Premier's Literary Awards — The Vance Palmer Prize for Fiction

== Notes ==
The novel carried the following dedication:

- "In memory of Leah Akie".

It also contained the following epigraphs:

- "Under cosmopolitanism, if it comes, we shall receive no help from the earth. Trees and meadows and mountains will only be a spectacle...." E.M. Forster Howards End.
- "But surely it would have been a pity not to have seen the trees along this road, really exaggerated in their beauty." Elizabeth Bishop Questions of Travel.
- "Anywhere! Anywhere!" Charles Baudelaire Anywhere Out of the World.

== Reviews ==
- Frank Moorhouse in The Guardian: "Australia has been waiting for a book which looks into the face of travel and sees it for all the illusions and traps and shallowness and, sometimes, life-changing meaning that it offers or withholds."
- Randy Boyagoda in The New York Times: "Like our expectations of travel, as opposed to the realities we usually experience, de Kretser’s novel is a book full of promise that offers many passing wonders and intensities amid a lot of busy-making and slack time."
