= Ali Cobby Eckermann =

Australian Indigenous poet

- Born: 1963 (age 62–63)
- Known for: Poetry
- Notable work: little bit long time, Ruby Moonlight, She is the Earth
- Awards: Windham-Campbell Literature Prize

Ali Cobby Eckermann (born 1963) is an Australian poet of Aboriginal Australian ancestry. She is a Yankunytjatjara woman born on Kaurna land in South Australia.

Eckermann has written poetry collections, verse novels and a memoir, and has been shortlisted for or won several literary awards. In 2017, she won the international Windham-Campbell Literature Prize for Poetry. She is a two-time winner of the New South Wales Premier's Literary Awards Book of the Year (2013, 2024), the Kenneth Slessor Prize for Poetry (2013) and Indigenous Writers' Prize (2024). She has travelled extensively, performing her poetry.

== Early life ==
Ali Cobby Eckermann was born Penelope Rae Cobby at the Kate Cocks Memorial Babies’ Home in Adelaide, traditional home of the Kaurna people, in 1963. She was adopted as a baby by a Lutheran couple, Clarrie and Frieda Eckermann. She grew up on a farm, and did her schooling at Brinkworth Area School and Clare High School, in mid-north South Australia.

Eckermann, her mother and her grandmother were all stolen, tricked or adopted away from their birth families, becoming part of the Stolen Generations.

She grew up in a loving supportive home, but she was assaulted sexually by a family friend when she seven years old, and experienced ongoing abuse and racism while growing up. At 17 she left home with a man with whom she lived for two years, but whom she left due to his violence. She returned home, only to discover she was pregnant, and gave birth when she was 19. Her son was adopted out.

After turning 18, Eckermann began searching for her birth mother, Audrey, but didn't find her until she was 34, after information had been released with the Bringing Them Home report in 1997. Four years later, she found her son Jonnie.

Most of her early adult life was spent in the Northern Territory, on Arrernte country, Jawoyn country and Larrakia country. She worked in various places, including a remote arts centre outside Alice Springs.

She says "I learnt to live in two different ways over my life. I learnt a good example of hard work and kindness from growing up with my mum and dad in my adopted family. And I’m extremely grateful that my traditional family welcomed me back with such love and honesty. I got a second chance to live in an honest world".

Eckermann's first poems were published in primary school.

Aboriginal writers that she met through festivals and workshops were her early inspirations, authors and poets such as Boori Pryor, Lionel Fogarty, Bill Neidje, Eva Johnson, Terry Whitebeach, Kim Scott, Romaine Morton and Alexis Wright.

== Writing career ==
Eckermann's literary career was established in 2009 after she submitted her first collection of poetry to a manuscript competition run by Australian Poetry. It was published under the title, little bit long time, first in pamphlet form by the Australian Poetry Centre and then in book form, both in 2009. Its subject matter is the problematic history of Indigenous Australians since colonial times, which means that she explores both her own life and experience, as an indigenous woman, as well as looking at the historical perspective. She returns to this subject matter repeatedly in her work.

Since then, she has published three more poetry collections, two verse novels and a memoir.

Her third book, and second verse novel, Ruby Moonlight, won a State Library of Queensland black&write! Writing Fellowship in 2012. Ruby Moonlight was awarded both Book of the Year and the Kenneth Slessor Prize for Poetry in the 2013 New South Wales Premier's Literary Awards.

Eckermann founded Australia's first Aboriginal Writers Retreat in Koolunga, in a 130-year-old general store which she restored.

In 2014, she participated in the International Writing Program's Fall Residency at the University of Iowa in Iowa City, United States as the first Aboriginal Australian writer to attend.

Her memoir Too Afraid to Cry won the inaugural Tangkanungku Pintyanthi Fellowship at the Adelaide Festival Awards for Literature in 2016.

=== Verse novels ===
Eckermann has written three verse novels, His Father's Eyes, Ruby Moonlight and She is the Earth.

Ruby Moonlight is set in remote South Australia in the 1880s. It explores, writes Sarah Holland-Batt, "broader ideas about colonialism’s hierarchies and power structures, and its lingering historical impact on the first peoples of this country, on language, and on the very landscape itself. One of the most remarkable things about Ruby Moonlight is the subtlety with which its political implications are handled: Eckermann invites (rather than dictates) political readings of what is, at heart, a simple and highly engaging narrative."

== Other activities ==
As of 2021, Eckermann is on the board of the First Nations Australia Writers Network (FNAWN).

== Awards and nominations ==
- 2013 New South Wales Premier's Literary Awards, winner of Book of the Year and Kenneth Slessor Prize for Poetry for Ruby Moonlight
- 2014 Adelaide Festival Awards for Literature John Bray Poetry Award, shortlisted for Ruby Moonlight
- 2015 New South Wales Premier's Literary Awards, shortlisted for Indigenous Writers' Prize for Inside My Mother
- 2016 Tangkanungku Pintyanthi Fellowship for Too Afraid to Cry
- 2016 Victorian Premier's Literary Award for Indigenous Writing, shortlisted for Inside My Mother
- 2017 Windham-Campbell Literature Prizes for Poetry
- 2018 Australia Council for the Arts Literature Fellowship
- 2024 New South Wales Premier's Literary Awards, winner of Book of the Year and Indigenous Writers' Prize for She Is the Earth
- 2024 Prime Minister's Literary Award for Poetry, shortlisted for She Is the Earth

== Bibliography ==
- —— (2009). Little Bit Long Time. Picaro Press. (poetry collection)
- —— (2010). Kami. Vagabond Press. (poetry collection)
- —— (2011). His Father's Eyes. Oxford University Press. ISBN 9780195571189. (verse novel)
- —— (2012). Love Dreaming & Other Poems. Vagabond Press. ISBN 9781922181053. (poetry collection)
- —— (2012). Too Afraid to Cry. Elsternwick, Victoria: Ilura Press. ISBN 9781921325243. (memoir)
- —— (2012). Ruby Moonlight. Magabala Books. ISBN 9781921248511. (verse novel)
- —— (2015). Inside My Mother. Artarmon, N.S.W.: Giramondo Publishing. ISBN 9781922146885. (poetry collection)
- —— (2023). She Is the Earth. Magabala Books. ISBN 9781922613202. (verse novel)
