= David Love =

David Love may refer to:

- David Love (geologist) (1913–2002), American field geologist
- David J. Love (born 1979), American electrical engineer
- David Love (politician), from New Hampshire, USA
- David Love (political candidate), 2007 political candidate from Manitoba, Canada
- David Love (journalist), author of Unfinished Business: Paul Keating's Interrupted Revolution
- David Love, state senator from Anson County in the North Carolina General Assembly of 1777
- David Love, actor in Teenagers from Outer Space
- David Love, guitarist for the band Iron Butterfly
- David Love, voice actor in The House of Yes
- David Love, Father, Candidate for Crooksville Ohio Mayor 2023
