= Clean (2022 film) =

2022 Australian documentary

- Directed by: Lachlan Mcleod
- Written by: Lachlan Mcleod
- Produced by: David Elliot-Jones, Charlotte Wheaton
- Starring: Sandra Pankhurst
- Edited by: Louis Dai
- Music by: Patrick Grigg
- Production company: Walking Fish Productions
- Distributed by: Rocket Science
- Release date: 2022
- Country: Australia
- Language: English

Clean is an Australian 2022 documentary film about the life of Sandra Pankhurst, a transgender woman who became best known for her work as a crime scene and trauma cleaner. The film centres on Pankhurst's journey from a difficult upbringing—which included adoption and an eventual teenage eviction—to her marriage and experiences with gender identity.

The film follows Pankhurst's early struggles with the eventual establishment of Specialist Trauma Cleaning Services, which has a team of cleaners who clean crime scenes, places where people have committed suicide, and incidents of hoarding. Pankhurst attends and leads jobs with her team while sharing her experiences and challenges of the industry as well as showcasing the nature of her profession. As the film progresses, Pankhurst's health declines, possibly due to extended exposure to cleaning substances. Nevertheless, she continues with her work and actively participates in public speaking engagements.

The cast includes Pankhurst, who plays herself, and her employees. The film was produced by David Elliot-Jones and Charlotte Wheaton of Walking Fish Productions and directed by Lachlan Mcleod who had been inspired by Pankhurst's story after seeing her on television.

Clean was released in 2022. The film was screened at the Melbourne International Film Festival and the Edinburgh International Film Festival. It was nominated for two awards at the Australian Academy of Cinema and Television Arts Awards in 2022. Audiences and critics received Clean well.

== Synopsis ==
Clean focuses on the life of Pankhurst. Pankhurst's mother was forced to give her up as a child. An unwelcoming family adopted her, and she was evicted at the age of seventeen. Born male, Pankhurst later married a woman and had children. The marriage failed once Pankhurst realised she wished to transition from male to female. Pankhurst tells the story of how she changed her name from Peter to Sandra, working in several jobs (including as a sex worker and drag queen) before becoming a funeral director. Her second marriage also ended in divorce.

The majority of the film focuses on Pankhurst's later life as the owner and operator of a trauma cleaning service named Specialist Trauma Cleaning Services, a cleaning company specialising in crime scene clean-up and hoarder restoration. The film follows Pankhurst as she attends various jobs across Melbourne, where she demonstrates and discusses the nature and challenges of cleaning crime scenes and assisting those living in squalor. Pankhurst reveals she is terminally ill, and this is likely due to exposure to cleaning chemicals early on in her business's development. Pankhurst is shown attending speaking events across Melbourne. Towards the end of the film, her employees are notified that Pankhurst has died owing to her illness.

== Cast ==
- Sandra Pankhurst as herself
- Cleaning workers Brian, Chris, Rod, and Kellie as themselves

== Production ==
David Elliot-Jones and Charlotte Wheaton of Walking Fish Productions produced Clean. Director Lachlan Mcleod first saw Pankhurst interviewed on the Australian television network, SBS, in a segment about the issue of hoarding. At this time, he had not read The Trauma Cleaner: One Woman's Extraordinary Life in Death, Decay & Disaster, a 2017 book authored by Sarah Krasnostein documenting Pankhurst's life. Pankhurst's trauma cleaning business caught his attention. Trauma cleaners, individuals tasked with restoring spaces following events such as murders, suicides, or tragic accidents, play a crucial role in rendering affected areas habitable once more. Mcleod spent three years filming Clean, and he grew close to Pankhurst over the course of production.

In an interview with Screen Australia, Mcleod explained that Pankhurst took some time to trust the film crew, but her love for being on camera helped the film's production. Filming with Pankhurst initially took place ad hoc, with the production crew capturing parts of Pankhurst's work Mcleod felt were important to Pankhurst's story. Mcleod stated that the filming really "ramped up" in the final six months of production. The first scene shot during the production of Clean also happened to be the final job Pankhurst worked on, as she shortly after became ill and hospitalised. Pankhurst died before the film was released. The film was screened at the 70th Melbourne International Film Festival and the Edinburgh International Film Festival.

== Reception ==
=== Critical response ===
On Rotten Tomatoes, the film has an approval rating of 100% based on 15 reviews. Critics generally gave the film positive reviews. However, criticism of the re-enactment scenes was consistent throughout many of the reviews. Cher Tang, in a review for The Guardian described the film as "shot plainly" without fanfare, although she also called the addition of re-enactments of events from Pankhurst's past an "unnecessary major misstep".

In Variety, Jessica Kiang also described the re-enactment scenes as unnecessary but noted Clean "remains an engaging, spirited film, designed less to provoke than to inspire". Fionnuala Halligan of Screen Daily considered the re-enactment scenes to be a negative in the film, calling them a "let down for a cast of characters who are so determinedly real". She wrote that the film though "not a complete film ... It's certainly a tribute to [Pankhurst]". John Noonan of FilmInk gave the film a score of 17 out of 20, though while his review was overall positive, he too criticised the re-enactments, calling them "histrionic".

David Rooney of The Hollywood Reporter described the film as a "warm tribute to [Pankhurst's] many lives", though he echoed the criticism of other critics in saying the film "could have done without the dramatic re-creations". He concluded by stating that Clean "is a remarkable character study with a final chapter that will leave you deeply moved". Stephen Russell from Time Out rated the film as "recommended", calling it a "fitting tribute to [Pankhurst's] life well lived" and praising the director for "wisely strip[ping] back the doco to centre on [Pankhurst's] story and her determination to bring order where there is chaos".

=== Awards and nominations ===
Award	Date of ceremony	Category	Recipient(s)	Result
Australian Academy of Cinema and Television Arts Awards	2022	Best Documentary	Lachlan Mcleod, David Elliot-Jones, Charlotte Wheaton	Nominated
Australian Academy of Cinema and Television Arts Awards	2022	Best Editing in a Documentary	Louis Dai, Lachlan Mcleod	Nominated

== See also ==
- Australian documentary films
- Transgender-related documentary films
