= Stephen Daisley =

New Zealand novelist (born 1955)

- Born: 1955 (age 70–71); Hastings, New Zealand
- Writing career
- Language: English
- Years active: 1990–present
- Notable work: Traitor (2010)

Stephen Daisley (born 1955) is a New Zealand novelist.

== Biography ==
Daisley was born in Hastings, New Zealand, and spent five years in the New Zealand army before working as a sheep herder, bush cutter, truck driver, construction worker and bartender. After marrying in New Zealand, he moved to Western Australia, attending Murdoch University and then the University of Western Australia for postgraduate studies. He now lives in Perth with his wife and five children.

Daisley won the 2011 Prime Minister's Literary Award for Fiction for his novel Traitor and the Ockham New Zealand Book Award, 2016, for his second novel Coming Rain.

== Bibliography ==
=== Novels ===
- Traitor (2010)
- Coming Rain (2015)
- A Better Place (2023)

== Awards ==
- 2011 winner Prime Minister's Literary Awards — Fiction – Traitor
- 2011 winner New South Wales Premier's Literary Awards — UTS Award for New Writing – Traitor
- 2011 shortlisted New South Wales Premier's Literary Awards — Christina Stead Prize for Fiction – Traitor
- 2011 shortlisted Commonwealth Writers Prize South East Asia and South Pacific Region — Best First Book – Traitor
- 2010 shortlisted Western Australian Premier's Book Awards — Fiction – Traitor
- 2016 winner Ockham New Zealand Book Award — Fiction – Coming Rain with a prize of $50,000
- 2024 shortlisted Jann Medlicott Acorn Prize for Fiction, Ockham New Zealand Book Awards — A Better Place
- 2024 winner Premier's Prize for Book of the Year, WA Premier's Book Awards — A Better Place
