= Kierin Meehan =

Australian writer

- Born: Brisbane, Queensland, Australia
- Education: University of Queensland; Queensland University of Technology
- Occupations: Children's author; Teacher; Choreographer
- Known for: Children's literature
- Notable work: Hannah's Winter; Night Singing; In the Monkey Forest

Kierin Meehan (born in Brisbane, Queensland) is an Australian children's book author, teacher and choreographer.

== Life ==
Meehan studied at the University of Queensland, where she received a degree in German and Japanese. She later obtained a graduate degree in performing arts (dance) from the Queensland University of Technology, and worked as a dance teacher and choreographer for ten years. Meehan also taught German and Japanese language lessons, and lived in Japan for one year.

== Writing career ==
Meehan began writing in Esashi, a town on the west coast of Hokkaidō, Japan, when she was asked to write a monthly column for the town's magazine. To date, she has written three books: Hannah's Winter (2001), Night Singing (2003) and In the Monkey Forest (2005). Hannah's Winter was a notable book in the 2002 CBC Awards, and Night Singing and In the Monkey Forest both received the Patricia Wrightson Prize. Meehan also wrote a fourth novel, Ten Rules for Detectives.
