= Meme McDonald =

Australian children's author and theatre director

Meme McDonald (19 July 1954 – 23 December 2017) was an Australian writer, artistic director and advocate for Indigenous reconciliation.

== Early life and education ==
McDonald was born on 19 July 1954 in St George, Queensland. Living on the land, she was taught by her mother until age eight, when she was sent away to boarding school. She later attended the Victorian College of Arts, where she studied dramatic art. She also held a BA from the University of Queensland and an MA from the University of Melbourne.

== Career ==
After graduating from the Victorian College of the Arts, McDonald and others founded WEST Theatre Company. She was artistic director there from 1979 to 1986.

McDonald died on 23 December 2017 at Spring Hill, Victoria.

== Awards and recognition ==
Three of the books she co-authored with Boori Monty Pryor won awards:

- My Girragundji won the 1999 Children's Book of the Year Award: Younger Readers.
- The Binna Binna Man won Book of the Year, as well as the Ethnic Affairs Commission award and Ethel Turner Prize for young people's literature at the 2000 New South Wales Premier's Literary Awards.
- Njunjul the Sun won the Prize for Young Adult Fiction at the 2002 Victorian Premier's Literary Awards.

In 2012 McDonald received the Australia Council Ros Bower Award for Community Arts and Cultural Development.

== Works ==
- The Way of the Birds: A child and curlew travel across the world, 1996
- Maybe Tomorrow, with Boori Monty Pryor, 1998
- Girragundji Trilogy
  - My Girragundji, with Boori Monty Pryor, 1998
  - The Binna Binna Man, with Boori Monty Pryor, 1999
  - Njunjul the Sun, with Boori Monty Pryor, 2002
- Flytrap, with Boori Monty Pryor, 2002
- Sister Chick Flies the Way of the Birds, 2002
- Love Like Water, 2007
