= Traitor (Daisley novel) =

2010 novel by Stephen Daisley

- Author: Stephen Daisley
- Language: English
- Genre: novel
- Publisher: Text Publishing, Australia
- Publication date: 2010
- Publication place: Australia
- English publication date: 2 August 2010
- Media type: Print (Paperback)
- Pages: 239
- ISBN: 9781921656491
- Followed by: Coming Rain

Traitor is a 2010 novel written by New Zealand author Stephen Daisley. It won the Prime Minister's Literary Award in Australia in 2011 for Best Fiction.

== Plot summary ==
Young New Zealand soldier David Monroe is fighting at Gallipoli in World War I when he meets a Turkish doctor, Mohammad. As they tend to a wounded soldier a bomb bursts nearby and both are sent to an army hospital on the island of Lemnos. The novel explores the growing friendship between the two men, and two cultures, as they recover from their wounds.

== Notes ==
- Dedication: Dedicated to the memory of C.A. Daisley - née Lal Radcliffe 1920-2009
- Epigraph: "I hate the idea of causes, and if I had to choose between betraying my country and betraying my friend, I hope I would have the guts to betray my country." - E.M. Forster

== Review ==
James Bradley in The Australian noted: "At its best, Daisley's prose possesses a shimmering, allusive beauty reminiscent of John McGahern. Sequences such as the stunning description of the ageing David's journey out into a rainy morning to supervise the lambing lend the novel an almost sacred quality."

== Awards and nominations ==
- 2010 shortlisted Western Australian Premier's Book Awards — Fiction
- 2011 shortlisted Commonwealth Writer's Prize - Southeast Asia and South Pacific Region — Best First Book
- 2011 shortlisted New South Wales Premier's Literary Awards — Christina Stead Prize for Fiction
- 2011 winner New South Wales Premier's Literary Awards — UTS Award for New Writing
- 2011 winner Prime Minister's Literary Awards — Fiction
- 2016 winner Ockham New Zealand Book Awards — Fiction
