= Gabrielle Wang =

Australian writer and illustrator

- Born: Melbourne, Victoria, Australia
- Occupations: Writer, illustrator
- Writing career
- Notable awards: Australian Children's Laureate
- Website: gabriellewang.com

Gabrielle Wang is an Australian writer and illustrator for children and young adults based in Melbourne. Many of her books have been shortlisted for significant awards, and she was Australian Children's Laureate in 2022–2023.

== Early life and education ==
Garbrielle Wang was born in Melbourne, Australia. She is a fourth-generation Australian on her mother's side, her ancestors having come to Australia during the Australian gold rushes of the mid-1800s.

She trained as a graphic designer in Melbourne, then studied painting and language in Taiwan and China.

== Career ==
Wang lectured in Chinese at RMIT University in Melbourne before writing full-time. Her work is influenced by her experiences of growing up between two cultures.

Her children's novel, A Ghost in my Suitcase, was adapted for the stage by Vanessa Bates of Barking Gecko Theatre, and toured in 2019.

== Recognition and awards ==
In March 2022 Wang was named the Australian Children's Laureate for 2022–2023.

In January 2023, she was invited to give the Wang Gungwu Lecture at the National Foundation for Australia-China Relations.

=== For books ===
Wang's books have been awarded or shortlisted as follows:

- The Garden of Empress Cassia
  - Shortlisted for the Aurealis Awards 2002 Best Children's (8-12y) Long Fiction
- The Pearl of Tiger Bay
  - Shortlisted for the Aurealis Awards 2004 Best Children's (8-12y) Long Fiction
- The Lion Drummer
  - Children's Book Council of Australia Book of the Year Awards 2009 - Notable Book
- A Ghost in my Suitcase
  - Shortlisted for the 2011 Sakura Medal
  - Children's Book Council of Australia Book of the Year Awards 2010 - Notable Book
  - Shortlisted for the Aurealis Awards 2009 Best Children's (8-12y) Long Fiction
- The Race for the Chinese Zodiac
  - Shortlisted for the WAYRBA, YABBA, KOALA Awards 2011
- Our Australian Girl: Meet Poppy
  - Shortlisted for the YABBA, Kroc, COOL, KOALA Awards 2012
  - Shortlisted in the 2012 WAYRBA Awards
- The Wishbird
  - Children's Book Council of Australia Book of the Year Awards 2014 - Notable Book
  - Shortlisted for the Australian Book Design Awards 2014
  - Shortlisted for the YABBA, Kroc, KOALA Awards 2014
  - Shortlisted for the Crystal Kite Award 2014
- The Beast of Hushing Wood
  - Shortlisted for the Speech Pathology Awards 2018
- Ting Ting the Ghosthunter
  - Shortlisted for the Aurealis Awards 2018 Best Long Children's Fiction
- Zadie Ma and the Dog Who Chased the Moon
  - Shortlisted for the Children's Book Award, 2023 Queensland Literary Awards
  - Shortlisted for the Children's Award, 2023 Prime Minister's Literary Awards

== Selected works ==
- The Garden of Empress Cassia, Penguin Australia (2002)
- The Pearl of Tiger Bay Penguin Australia (2004)
- Kids Night In 2 Penguin Australia (2005)
- 'The Hidden Monastery' Puffin Books (2006)
- 'The Lion Drummer' Puffin Books (2008)
- 'A Ghost in my Suitcase' Penguin Australia (2009)
- 'Little Paradise' Puffin Books (2010)
- 'The Race for the Chinese Zodiac' Black Dog Books (2012)
- 'Poppy Comes Home' Bk 4 Puffin Books (2011)
- 'Poppy and the Thief' Bk 3 Puffin Books (2011)
- 'Poppy at Summerhill' Bk 2 Puffin Books (2011)
- 'Meet Poppy' Bk1 Puffin Books (2011)
- 'The Wishbird' Penguin Australia (2013)
- 'Pearlie's Ghost' Bk 4 Penguin Australia (2014)
- 'Pearlie the Spy' Bk 3 Penguin Australia (2014)
- 'Pearlie's Pet Rescue' Bk 2 Penguin Australia (2014)
- 'Meet Pearlie' Bk 1 Penguin Australia (2014)
- 'The Poppy Stories (4 books in 1) Penguin Australia (2016)
- 'Two Enchanted Tales from Old China' Christmas Press (2017)
- 'The Beast of Hushing Wood' Penguin Australia (2017)
- 'The Pearlie Stories' (4 books in 1) Penguin RH (2018)
- 'Ting Ting the Ghost Hunter' Penguin RH (2018)
- 'Zadie Ma and the Dog Who Chased the Moon' Penguin RH (2022)
