= The Hamilton Case =

2003 novel by Michelle de Kretser

- First edition
- Author: Michelle de Kretser
- Language: English
- Genre: Literary, Crime novel
- Publisher: Knopf, Australia
- Publication date: 2003
- Publication place: Australia
- Media type: Print (Hardback & Paperback)
- Pages: 369 pp
- ISBN: 1-74051-197-2
- OCLC: 156226416
- Preceded by: The Rose Grower
- Followed by: The Lost Dog

The Hamilton Case is a 2003 novel by Australian author Michelle de Kretser.

The book won the Commonwealth Writers Prize (SE Asia & Pacific) and the Encore Award (UK).

== Synopsis ==
The work centres on the lives of the somewhat eccentric Obeysekere family, in particular Sam, and the 1930s setting explores themes of colonization in Ceylon, now called Sri Lanka. Michelle de Kretser is originally from Sri Lanka. The title refers to a fictional case involving the murder of an English planter in Ceylon, which Sam Obeysekere, a lawyer, attempts to solve. Time Magazine named the book as one of the five best novels of 2004, referring to the date published in the United States.

== Awards ==
- Frankfurt Literaturpreis, 2007, winner
- International Dublin Literary Award, 2005, longlist
- Tasmania Pacific Region Prize, Fiction Prize, 2005, winner
- Festival Awards for Literature (SA), Dymocks Booksellers Award for Fiction, 2004, shortlist
- Believer Book Award, 2004, shortlist
- Commonwealth Writers Prize, South East Asia and South Pacific Region, Best Book, 2004, winner
- Encore Award, 2004, winner
- Time Magazine's Best Books of the Year, 2004, Fiction #5
- Barnes & Noble Discover Great New Writers Awards, Fiction, 2004, second
- The Age Book of the Year Award, Fiction Prize, 2003, shortlist
- Victorian Premier's Literary Award, The Vance Palmer Prize for Fiction, 2003, shortlist
