= Theory & Practice =

2024 novel by Michelle de Kretser

- Author: Michelle de Kretser
- Genre: Fiction
- Publisher: Text Publishing
- Publication date: 29 October 2024
- Publication place: Australia
- Pages: 192
- Awards: Stella Prize (2025); Prime Minister's Literary Award for Fiction (2025); South Australian Literary Awards, Fiction Award (2026)
- ISBN: 9781923058149

Theory & Practice is a 2024 novel by Australian author Michelle de Kretser. The novel is set in 1986 and is narrated by a Sri Lankan-born woman undertaking postgraduate studies on Virginia Woolf at the University of Melbourne. The book, which has been described as a coming-of-age novel, explores themes of feminism, race, and the tension between literary theory and practice. It received positive reviews. In 2025 it won the Stella Prize and the Prime Minister's Literary Award for Fiction and the following year won the Fiction award at the South Australian Literary Awards. It was also shortlisted for the Victorian Premier's Prize for Fiction and the Barbara Jefferis Award.

== Summary ==
The book opens by describing a 23-year-old Australian geologist living in Switzerland in 1957. He reflects on his childhood in outback New South Wales and recalls a theft he committed at the age of six, which was blamed on an Aboriginal maid who was then dismissed.

The book then abruptly shifts into the first person, with the author explaining that "at this point, the novel I was writing stalled". The novel then shifts to the perspective of a Sri Lankan-born woman who is a graduate student at Melbourne University in 1986. The narrator has recently moved to Melbourne from Sydney to write a thesis about the work of Virginia Woolf. She soon begins sleeping with Kit, an engineering student who is in "a deconstructed relationship" with his girlfriend Olivia, but quickly becomes jealous of Olivia and fantasises about revenge. She is ashamed of her jealousy towards Olivia, feeling that it is incongruent with her feminist ideals, but is overwhelmed by her desire for Kit.

Meanwhile, her research begins to come under tension when she encounters racist diary entries written by Woolf. Her advisor discourages her from shifting her thesis to focus on Woolf's racism, encouraging her to focus on Woolf's public works and steering her towards a focus on theory. But the narrator feels constrained by the increasing dominance of theory in academia, expressing frustration at the demands to squeeze Woolf's ideas into the "corset of theory".

== Publication history ==
Theory & Practice was first published in Australia by Text Publishing on 29 October 2024 (ISBN 9781923058149). It was published in the United States by Catapult on 18 February 2025 (ISBN 9781646222872) and in the United Kingdom by Sort of Books on 27 February 2025 (ISBN 9781914502163).

== Reception ==
The book received generally positive reviews. Reviewing the book in The Atlantic, Sophia Stewart described it as "sly, spiky, and brilliant". In a review published in the New York Times Review of Books, Emily Eakin wrote that the book was a "taut, enthralling hybrid of fact and fiction impossible to disentangle". The book received a starred review in Publishers Weekly, which described it as "sharp-witted and mesmerizing", while a review in Kirkus Reviews described it as a "ferociously intelligent novel from a writer at the height of her powers".

Reviewers praised the novel's unconventional construction, with Jack Callil writing in The Guardian that the book "push[es] the margins of what a novel can look and feel like". De Kretser weaves non-fiction elements into the narrative, using the book's construction to experiment with narrative form and structure. Eva Gunaydin wrote in The Conversation that the book "uses a hybrid form to comment on form itself", while Eakin wrote in the New York Times Review of Books that the novel was "a bold experiment in form". Reviewers also praised the way in which the book circled back to the initial, fragmented narrative with which it began. Tim Adams wrote in a review in The Guardian that "it is a measure of De Kretser’s beguiling talent as a novelist that she holds both these tales in balance without the whole ever threatening to fall apart".

Reviewers also commented on de Kretser's critique of the "inevitable breakdowns between theory and practice". In a review in the Los Angeles Times, Jessica Ferri praised de Kretser's ability to grapple with this tension, writing that the novel is "like a coming-of-age novel or perhaps a coming-to-writing novel" and that it is "anything but conventional...it is something new, born of the recognition between holding two truths in mind at once". In a review in Australian Book Review, Nicole Abadee wrote that De Kretser "deplores the damage that an overly enthusiastic embrace of theory has wrought on the humanities", and that the book is adept at "showing without telling the 'messy gap' and the 'breakdowns' between theory and practice".

Reviewers also praised de Kretser for her nuanced exploration of race and gender. The novel's narrator grapples with the racist statements of Virginia Woolf, who she describes as her "Woolfmother" and with whom she feels a type of maternal connection, but feels constrained by the expectation that she limit her research to Woolf's novels and separate the author's public work from her private attitudes. Gunaydin wrote in The Conversation that de Kretser "captures the betrayals, jealousies and failures of sisterhood". In a review in the Financial Times, Catherine Taylor describes the book as a deconstructionist work that "tackles colonialism, gender politics and the slippery bond between mother figures and daughters".

== Awards ==
Awards for Theory & Practice
Year	Award	Category	Result	Ref.
2025	Stella Prize	—	Won	
2025	Victorian Premier's Literary Awards	Victorian Premier's Prize for Fiction	Shortlisted	
2025	Miles Franklin Award	—	Shortlisted	
2025	Prime Minister's Literary Awards	Fiction	Won	
2025	Voss Literary Prize	—	Longlisted	
2026	Barbara Jefferis Award	—	Shortlisted	
2026	South Australian Literary Awards	Fiction	Won	
