= The Immigrants (Giovannoni novel) =

2025 novel by Moreno Giovannoni

- Author: Moreno Giovannoni
- Language: English
- Genre: Literary novel
- Publisher: Black Inc
- Publication date: July 2025
- Publication place: Australia
- Media type: Print (Paperback)
- Pages: 304
- Awards: 2026 The Age Book of the Year Awards – Fiction Prize, winner; 2026 Christina Stead Prize for Fiction, winner
- ISBN: 9781760645267

The Immigrants (2025) is a novel written by Australian author Moreno Giovannoni. It was originally published by Black Inc. The novel is also known by its full title of The immigrants : fabula mirabilis, or, a wonderful story.

The novel was the winner of the Fiction Prize at the 2026 The Age Book of the Year Awards, and the 2026 Christina Stead Prize for Fiction at the New South Wales Premier's Literary Awards.

== Plot summary ==
The novel follows the story of Ugo, an Italian immigrant to Australia in the 1950s. He arrives in Melbourne without his wife Morena and infant son Moreno, who have stayed behind. A year later the family is re-united in the small, tobacco-growing town of Mitrefò.

The novel is based on the life of the author's family.

== Critical reception ==
Geordie Williamson, in a review for The Saturday Paper, notes that the author's vision is a bleak one, "for all its eloquent retrospection".

Reviewing the novel for The Guardian newspaper Joseph Cummins was very impressed with the work: "The Immigrants is an understatedly beautiful book, about a critically important part of Australia’s history and social fabric. The labour and suffering of Moreno’s family and others like them is fittingly remembered, and celebrated, in these pages."

== Awards ==
- 2026 The Age Book of the Year Awards, Fiction prize – winner
- 2026 Christina Stead Prize for Fiction – winner
- 2026 Victorian Premier's Literary Awards — Prize for Fiction, shortlisted
