= Australian Children's Laureate =

The Australian Children's Laureate is a role appointed to an Australian children's author and/or illustrator with the purpose of promoting the power of reading to children. It is a two-year role and was inaugurated in 2011, for the 2012–2013 period. The inaugural appointment was a dual one, with Alison Lester and Boori Monty Pryor being announced as joint Australian Children's Laureates. The Australian Children's Laureate was inspired by similar programs in the UK, the Children's Laureate instituted in 1999, and the US, the National Ambassador for Young People's Literature instituted in 2008. These programs also award two-year appointments.

== Background ==
The Australian Children's Laureate Foundation (ACLF) is an independent not-for-profit organisation whose primary activity is the development and management of the Australian Children's Laureate program The Australian Children's Laureate program was initiated by the Australian Children's Literature Alliance in 2008, an organisation comprising authors, publishers, booksellers, librarians, teachers and representatives from arts bodies.

ACLF defines the role of the Laureate as being to "promote the transformational power of reading, creativity and story in the lives of young Australians, while acting as a national and international ambassador for Australian children’s literature." The laureates receive a stipend to carry out their role, which includes travelling to every state and territory in Australia, at least once, during the course of their appointment. Each Laureate has their own unique project undertaken during the course of their laureateship.

== Australian Children's Laureates ==
Years	Author
2012–2013	Alison Lester and Boori Monty Pryor
2014–2015	Jackie French
2016–2017	Leigh Hobbs
2018–2019	Morris Gleitzman
2020–2021	Ursula Dubosarsky
2022–2023	Gabrielle Wang
2024–2025	Sally Rippin
2026–2027	Andy Griffiths

== See also ==
- Children's Laureate
- Te Awhi Rito New Zealand Reading Ambassador
