= The Lebs =

2018 novel by Michael Mohammed Ahmad

- First edition
- Author: Michael Mohammed Ahmad
- Language: English
- Publisher: Hachette
- Publication date: 2018

The Lebs is a 2018 novel by Australian author Michael Mohammed Ahmad, published by Hachette. It is a sequel to Ahmad's 2014 novel The Tribe.

The title refers to the usually derogatory slang term sometimes used for Lebanese Australians.

== Plot ==
The novel centres on protagonist Bani Adam and his experiences of power dynamics, cultural frictions, rape culture and toxic masculinity as a student at Punchbowl Boys High School in Western Sydney.

== Awards ==
New South Wales Premier's Literary Awards NSW Multicultural Award - 2019 - Winner

Miles Franklin Award - 2019 - Shortlisted

== Reviews ==
- Caward, Clinton (8 March 2018). "The Lebs Review: Michael Mohammed Ahmad's edgy novel about Muslim youth". Sydney Morning Herald.
- Bitto, Emily (May 2018). "The Lebs by Michael Mohammed Ahmad: A fresh perspective on Muslim youth in Sydney's west". The Monthly.
