= Ray Parkin =

Australian writer (1910–2005)

Raymond Edward Parkin AM (6 November 1910 – 19 June 2005) was an Australian naval seaman, writer, draftsman, artist and historian. He is noted for his memoirs of World War II (including his time as a prisoner-of-war), and for a major work on James Cook's Endeavour voyage.

== Early life ==
Parkin was born in the Melbourne suburb of Collingwood on 6 November 1910, the youngest of three children. An early interest in ships saw him join the sea scouts. He also became interested in art and drawing (especially the drawing of ships), and after leaving school at age 14, he took a job at an engraving firm.

In 1928, aged 18, he joined the Royal Australian Navy. He rose through the ranks of the navy to become a chief petty officer and, in 1939, he was drafted onto the newly commissioned light cruiser HMAS Perth. Its first peace-time mission was a voyage to New York to represent Australia at the World's Fair, after which the vessel saw service in World War II.

== World War II ==
Parkin began writing during his war service. He started a novel, which was lost when Perth was sunk by Japanese action in the Sunda Strait in the early hours of 1 March 1942.

After about 11 hours in the water, Parkin and nine other survivors washed up on a small island. They found a steel lifeboat and rigged a sail and tried to get back to Australia. Over 16 days, covering 500 miles, they managed to slip past enemy shipping and endured tropical storms before reaching occupied Tjilatjap where they were greeted by Dutch Officers, who handed them over to Japanese troops.

In June 1942, Parkin was imprisoned in Bandoeng camp. There he met South African soldier and author Laurens van der Post and they became friends. Among other prisoners with an interest in art was Dutch artist Keis von Willigen, and together they would source paper from wherever they could. Van der Post managed to get Parkin a set of watercolour paints from a Chinese contact and with these he would create portraits of fellow prisoners.

In November 1942, Parkin was among the "Dunlop 1,000", a group of prisoners under the authority of Australian army surgeon Lieutenant Colonel "Weary" Dunlop who were sent to work on the infamous Burma-Thailand Railway. Despite the hardship, Parkin continued to draw, focusing on the beauty that could be found: plants, butterflies, nature generally. Others, like English-born artist Jack Chalker, recorded the horrors of the camps.

In March 1944, Parkin was among a group of prisoners selected to be shipped to Japan. He couldn't keep his collection of drawings and diary notes concealed on that trip, so Dunlop offered to look after them for him. Dunlop had a false bottom in his operating table, where he could hide things like Chalker's medical drawings and Parkin's collection of artworks & papers.

Parkin ended up working in an underground coal mine near the Japanese village of Ohama and remained there until the Japanese surrender in August 1945.

== Post war experience ==
Back in Melbourne and reunited with his wife and children, he went to work as a tally clerk on the wharves. Weary Dunlop had kept his drawings, and Parkin made them into a little volume dedicated to Dunlop. Some of the sketches were printed in Dunlop's published diaries about the camps.

Parkin too wrote about his experiences as a prisoner-of-war. His memoirs he wrote in novel form; the character of John (or Jack) is Parkin in all but name. Sir Laurens van der Post recommended them to the Hogarth Press in London, and these were published as Out of the Smoke (1960) Into the Smother (1963), and The Sword and the Blossom (1968). The books were praised for the simple and direct quality of the writing.

He continued to work on the Melbourne waterfront till retirement in 1975.

== H. M. Bark Endeavour ==
In 1967, Parkin started researching James Cook's voyage to Australia aboard HM Bark Endeavour. He was first inspired by an inaccurate picture of the ship when searching for a representation on which to base a Christmas card. Over the years he discovered and dispelled several misconceptions built up about Cook, his crew, and the ship, including rehabilitating the reputation of Sydney Parkinson's drawings of the ship.

Parkinson was a draftsman on the voyage and his sketches are the only surviving contemporaneous drawings of the ship, but the received wisdom among historians was that Parkinson had taken artistic license, since the drawings seemed inexact and differed from Admiralty plans. Parkin's detailed knowledge of the ship and seafaring showed that what had been thought just squiggles were actual equipment on the ship, and where the sketches and the plans differed it was almost certainly from variations during building (it being fairly common at the time for shipwrights to have some freedom in how plans were executed). Some of Parkins research was done in London.

Parkin's neighbour, history professor Max Crawford, encouraged him to continue the research and publish the results. The research took 13 years, and it then took a further 17 years to find a publisher. In the end John Clarke (best known as a satirist) showed it to publisher Mark Kelly, who in turn recommended it to the speciality academic imprint The Miegunyah Press at the Melbourne University Press.

The result was H. M. Bark Endeavour published in two volumes in 1997. It won the Douglas Stewart Prize for non-fiction and the NSW Book of the Year in the New South Wales Premier's Literary Awards for 1999. Parkin thought himself a little out of place at the awards ceremony, as he put it, "It was funny, though, this doddering old bloke who used to work on the wharves–what did I have in common with the intellectual literary crowd?".

Parkin died in Melbourne on 19 June 2005. He was survived by his three children, six grand-children and eight great-grandchildren.

In 2005, Parkin's three wartime memoirs were republished in a single paperback volume by Melbourne University Publishing. The volume was reviewed by critic Max Harris who described it as, “probably the finest POW writing in English.”

A biography of Parkin, Ray Parkin's Odyssey, by Pattie Wright, was published in 2012.

== Bibliography ==
- Out of the Smoke
- Into the Smother
- The Sword and the Blossom
- H. M. Bark Endeavour: Her Place in Australian History, Miegunyah Press, first edition 1997 (two volumes), second edition 2003 (one volume) ISBN 0-522-85093-6.
- Out of the Smoke; Into the Smother; The Sword and the Blossom, 2003, Melbourne University Publishing, ISBN 0-522-85067-7. (See also Publisher's web page.)
