= Find Me at the Jaffa Gate =

- Author: Micaela Sahhar
- Language: English
- Publisher: NewSouth Publishing
- Publication date: 1 May 2025
- Publication place: Sydney, New South Wales, Australia
- Pages: 304
- ISBN: 978-1-761-17028-7

Find Me at the Jaffa Gate : An Encyclopaedia of a Palestinian Family is a 2025 autobiography by Australian-Palestinian writer Micaela Sahhar. Published by NewSouth Publishing, the book won both the 2026 non-fiction award at the Victorian Premier's Literary Awards and the Queensland Literary Awards.

In 2022, Sahhar received a scholarship from the Neilma Sidney Literary Travel Fund that enabled her to travel to Palestine where she conducted research for her manuscript, "Encyclopaedia of a Palestinian Family".

== Awards ==
Year	Award	Category	Result	Ref.
2026	Victorian Premier's Literary Awards	Victorian Premier's Prize for Nonfiction	Winner	
2026	Stella Prize	–	Longlisted	
2026	New South Wales Premier's Literary Awards	UTS Glenda Adams Award for New Writing	Winner	
2026	New South Wales Premier's Literary Awards	Multicultural NSW Award	Shortlisted	
2026	New South Wales Premier's Literary Awards	Douglas Stewart Prize for Non-Fiction	Shortlisted	
2026	National Biography Award	–	Shortlisted	
2026	Queensland Literary Awards	Non-Fiction Book Award	Winner	
2026	South Australian Literary Awards	Nonfiction Award	Winner	
