= The Tribe (novel) =

2014 Australian novel by Michael Mohammed Ahmad

- First edition
- Author: Michael Mohammed Ahmad
- Language: English
- Publisher: Giramondo
- Publication date: 2014
- Dewey Decimal: 823.914
- LC Class: PR9619.3.A446 T75

The Tribe is a 2014 novel by Australian author Michael Mohammed Ahmad, published by Giramondo.

== Plot ==
The novel focuses on the world of three generations of Lebanese Australians, as observed by young protagonist Bani.

== Awards ==
- The Sydney Morning Herald Best Young Australian Novelists - 2015 - won

== Links ==
https://overland.org.au/2014/05/writing-arab-australian-universes/
