= The Trauma Cleaner =

2017 biography by Sarah Krasnostein

- Author: Sarah Krasnostein
- Audio read by: Rachael Tidd
- Language: English
- Publisher: Text Publishing
- Publication date: 2017
- Publication place: Australia
- ISBN: 9781925498523

The Trauma Cleaner: One Woman's Extraordinary Life in Death, Decay & Disaster is a 2017 biography written by Australian author Sarah Krasnostein, chronicling the life and career of transgender woman Sandra Pankhurst. The book details Pankhurst's 1953 birth in Melbourne, her adoption by unwanting parents, marriage and divorce, and her transition from male to female. The book also details her early career (which included time spent as a sex worker, taxi dispatcher, drag queen, and funeral director), and also her eventual business, Specialist Trauma Cleaning Services, a cleaning company specialising in crime scene cleanup and hoarder restoration.

== Summary ==
Krasnostein spent four years writing The Trauma Cleaner, during which she attended 20 jobs with Pankhurst across Melbourne.

Each section of the book is loosely and intuitively structured around a different trauma-cleaning job around Melbourne.

== Reception ==
Jane Housham of The Guardian opined in a book review that Krasnostein brings "deep compassion" to her account of Pankhurst's life, though Housham thought the use of metaphors was overdone. Housham stated The Trauma Cleaner to be a "monumental biography of a singular and unforgettable woman." In an article covering The Trauma Cleaner, Lou Heinrich, also of The Guardian, opined that "Krasnostein’s playful yet heartfelt debut is one of the most arresting works of biography you will read in a long time."

A review by "CG" in The Saturday Paper presented The Trauma Cleaner as a "meticulously put-together biography". CG described Krasnostein's portrayal as an "act of love," which highlights her empathy and devotion to Pankhurst's story. CG credits Krasnostein's book as a poignant exploration of trauma, resilience, and the human capacity for connection and belonging. Marilyn Stasio of The New York Times referred to The Trauma Cleaner as a "one-of-a kind biography".

Lorien Kaye of The Sydney Morning Herald commended The Trauma Cleaner as "extraordinarily impressive." While acknowledging minor flaws, she praised the biography's overall quality. Kaye praised Krasnostein for her exploration of resilience, coping mechanisms, and the pursuit of belonging amidst trauma. Kaye described a potentially voyeuristic aspect of reading about trauma but found Krasnostein mitigated this sensation by approaching matters with empathy and sensitivity. Kay highlighted the fascination Krasnostein and readers share with Pankhurst's resilience and empathy for others amidst trauma. She also observed that Kaye praised The Trauma Cleaner for not treating Pankhurst with undue reverence, stating the biography was "not a hagiography". Rather, notes Kaye, Krasnostein portrays Pankhurst's flaws but does so with the same compassion as Pankhurst herself and also celebrates the good in Pankhurst. Kaye found The Trauma Cleaner to contain some flaws, such as contradictory sentences and occasional exaggerations, though she noted any faults were "entirely forgiveable because of the astonishing quality" of the biography.

Booklist's Heather Booth reviewed the audiobook favorably, highlighting narrator Rachael Tidd's "straightforward" narration and the way "she alters her tone to match the personalities of the characters who speak"; however, Booth mentioned that "production imperfections like audible page turns sometimes distract". Booklist ultimately included the audiobook on their 2019 Listen List for Outstanding Audio Narration.

== Awards ==
- 2019 Douglas Stewart Prize for Non-Fiction (joint winner)
- 2018 General Non-Fiction Book of the Year at the Australian Book Industry Awards
- 2018 Dobbie Literary Award
- 2018 Victorian Premier's Literary Awards - Victorian Premier's Prize for Nonfiction
- 2018 Victorian Premier's Literary Awards - Victorian Prize for Literature

== Adaptation ==
In 2022, the documentary film "Clean" was released, focusing on the life of Pankhurst. Although not directly affiliated with "The Trauma Cleaner", Cher Tan of The Guardian described "Clean" as a "sequel of sorts" to the book.

== See also ==
- Sarah Krasnostein
- Sandra Pankhurst
- Clean (2022 film)
