= The Lost Dog =

Book by Michelle de Kretser

- First edition
- Author: Michelle de Kretser
- Cover artist: Ampersand Duck
- Language: English
- Publisher: Allen & Unwin, Australia
- Publication date: 2007
- Publication place: Australia
- Media type: Print (Hardback & Paperback)
- Pages: 345 pp
- ISBN: 978-1-74175-339-4
- OCLC: 177704074
- Dewey Decimal: 823/.92 22
- LC Class: PR9619.4.D4 L67 2007
- Preceded by: The Hamilton Case

The Lost Dog is a 2007 novel by Australian writer Michelle de Kretser.

== Plot ==
Tom Loxley is holed up in a remote bush shack trying to finish his book on Henry James when his beloved dog goes missing. In what follows the novel loops back and forth in time to take the reader on a journey into worlds far removed from the present tragedy.

== Reviews ==
Reviewing the novel for The New Statesman, Jane Shilling noted: "Reading The Lost Dog, one is torn between contradictory urges - to race ahead, in order to find out what happens, and to linger in admiration of de Kretser's ravishing style."

In The Guardian, Carmen Callil stated her opinion upfront: "This is my favourite kind of novel. It is full of incident and character, tells a gripping story, has many touches of brilliance and can make you laugh and wonder. But it is also mightily flawed...These lapses aside, the language is full of light, colour and precise observation and, better still, the author can handle ethical and political concerns with a light touch."

== Awards ==
| Year | Award | | Result | Ref |
|---|---|---|---|---|
| 2008 | ALS Gold Medal | — | Won | |
| 2008 | Australia-Asia Literary Award | — | longlisted | |
| 2008 | Barbara Jefferis Award | — | Shortlisted | |
| 2008 | Commonwealth Writers' Prize | South East Asia and South Pacific Region, Best Book | Shortlisted | |
| 2008 | Man Booker Prize | — | Longlisted | |
| 2008 | New South Wales Premier's Literary Awards | Book of the Year | Won | |
| 2008 | New South Wales Premier's Literary Awards | Christina Stead Prize for Fiction | Won | |
| 2008 | Victorian Premier's Literary Award | Vance Palmer Prize for Fiction | Shortlisted | |

== External ==
=== Interviews ===
- Robert Dessaix on ABC Radio National's The Book Show from November 2007.
- "Fiona Gruber interview". The Sydney Morning Herald. November 2007.
- Rosemary Neill interview in The Australian from March 2008.
- In conversation with Gail Jones at the 2008 Sydney Writers' Festival in May 2008.
