= Michelle de Kretser =

Australian novelist

- De Kretser in 2026
- Born: Colombo, Ceylon
- Citizenship: Australian
- Education: University of Melbourne
- Partner: Chris Andrews
- Writing career
- Notable works: The Hamilton Case; The Lost Dog; Questions of Travel; The Life to Come
- Notable awards: Miles Franklin Award (2013, 2018); Christina Stead Prize for Fiction (2008, 2014, 2019)

Michelle de Kretser is an Australian novelist who was born in Sri Lanka (then Ceylon). She is a two-time winner of the Miles Franklin Award who has won the Christina Stead Prize for Fiction on three occasions.

== Early life and education ==
Born in Sri Lanka (then Ceylon), de Kretser moved to Australia in 1972 when she was 14. Her father was Oswald Leslie De Kretser III, a judge of the Supreme Court of Ceylon.

She was educated at Methodist College, Colombo, in Melbourne at Elwood College, and in Paris.

== Career ==
From 1989 to 1992, De Kretser was a founding editor of the Australian Women's Book Review. She worked as an editor for the travel guide company Lonely Planet, and while on a sabbatical in 1999, wrote and published her first novel, The Rose Grower.

Her second novel, The Hamilton Case, was winner of the Tasmania Pacific Prize, the Encore Award (in the UK) and the Commonwealth Writers' Prize (Southeast Asia and Pacific). Her third novel, The Lost Dog, was published in 2007. It was one of 13 books on the longlist for the 2008 Man Booker Prize.

Her fourth novel, Questions of Travel, won several awards, including the 2013 Miles Franklin Award, the 2013 ALS Gold Medal, and the 2013 Prime Minister's Literary Award for Fiction. It was also shortlisted for the 2014 International Dublin Literary Award.

Her 2017 novel, The Life to Come, was shortlisted for the 2018 Stella Prize, and won both the Miles Franklin Award and the Christina Stead Prize for Fiction. This is the third time Michelle de Kretser has won this prize and equals Peter Carey's record of wins.

Her novel Theory & Practice was published in 2024.

== Awards ==
- 2004 – Commonwealth Writers' Prize, South-East Asia and the Pacific for The Hamilton Case
- 2004 – Encore Award for The Hamilton Case
- 2005 – Tasmania Pacific Award for The Hamilton Case
- 2007 – Liberatur Award for The Hamilton Case
- 2008 – ALS Gold Medal for The Lost Dog
- 2008 – New South Wales Premier's Literary Awards – Christina Stead Prize for Fiction and Book of the Year for The Lost Dog
- 2013 – ALS Gold Medal for Questions of Travel
- 2013 – Miles Franklin Award for Questions of Travel
- 2013 – Prime Minister's Literary Awards Fiction Prize for Questions of Travel
- 2013 – Western Australian Premier's Book Awards Fiction Prize and Premier's Prize for Questions of Travel
- 2014 – New South Wales Premier's Literary Awards – Christina Stead Prize for Fiction and Book of the Year for Questions of Travel
- 2018 – Miles Franklin Award for The Life to Come
- 2019 – New South Wales Premier's Literary Awards – Christina Stead Prize for Fiction for The Life to Come
- 2023 – Rathbones Folio Prize for Fiction for Scary Monsters
- 2025 – Stella Prize for Theory & Practice
- 2025 – Prime Minister's Literary Awards for fiction for Theory & Practice
- 2026 – South Australian Literary Awards – Fiction Award for Theory & Practice

== Works ==
=== Novels ===
- The Rose Grower (1999)
- The Hamilton Case (2003)
- The Lost Dog (2007)
- Questions of Travel (2012)
- Springtime (2014)
- The Life to Come (2017)
- Scary Monsters (2021)
- Theory & Practice (2024)

=== Non-fiction ===
- On Shirley Hazzard (2019)
