= Boori Monty Pryor =

Aboriginal Australian storyteller and writer

- Born: 1950 (age 75–76); Townsville, Queensland, Australia
- Occupation: Novelist

Boori Monty Pryor (born 1950) is an Aboriginal Australian author best known as a storyteller and as the inaugural Australian Children's Laureate (2012–2013).

== Early life and family ==
Pryor is descended from the Birri Gubba nation of the Bowen region and the Kunggandji people from Yarrabah, near Cairns. His father was Monty Prior.

== Career ==
Pryor had a long career communicating Aboriginal Australian culture to schools in Australia, performing dances, playing didgeridoo, and storytelling, before turning to writing books. He has worked in film and television, sport, and music. In 1986, Boori had an acting role alongside his brother Paul Pryor in “Women of the Sun”.

In his keynote address for the 2013 Come Out Festival in Adelaide, Pryor spoke about the importance of storytelling, performance, and dance in engaging children with literacy, literature, and Indigenous cultures.

Pryor was an ambassador for the National Year of Reading (Australia) in 2012.

== In film ==
In 2018, ABC iView released the web/television series Wrong Kind of Black, narrated by and based on Pryor's life. In September 2019, the web series was nominated for an International Emmy.

== Awards and honours ==
In 1990, Pryor received the National Aboriginal and Islander Day Observance Committee (NAIDOC) Award as a result of his "outstanding contribution to the promotion of Indigenous culture".

In 2011, Shake a Leg won the Prime Minister's Literary Award for Children's Fiction. In 2012, Pryor and Alison Lester were named the first inaugural Australian Children's Laureates.

Pryor's works, including those in collaboration with Meme McDonald, have also won the Victorian Premier's Literary Award and the New South Wales Premier's Literary Award. Maybe Tomorrow (1998) won a Special Commendation from the Human Rights Awards and My Girragundji (1998), won a Children's Book Council of Australia Award, while The Binna Binna Man (1999), won several awards.

== Selected works ==
Picture Books

- Shake a Leg, illustrated by Jan Ormerod (2010), winner of the Prime Minister's Literary Award for Children's Fiction in 2011
- Story Doctors, illustrated by Rita Sinclair (2021)

Young adult novels

- My Girragundji, co-authored with Meme McDonald (1998), winner of a Children's Book Council of Australia Award
- The Binna Binna Man, co-authored with Meme McDonald (1999), won an Ethnic Affairs Commission Award in 2000
- Njunjul the Sun, co-authored with Meme McDonald (2002)
- Flytrap, co-authored with Meme McDonald (2002)

Non-fiction

- Maybe Tomorrow, co-authored with Meme McDonald (1998)
