= Cynthia Banham =

Australian journalist and academic

Cynthia Banham (born July 1972) is an Australian journalist and academic in the fields of political science and international law. Initially working as a lawyer, Banham switched to journalism in 1999, and became foreign affairs and defence correspondent for The Sydney Morning Herald. In 2007, she was on board Garuda Indonesia Flight 200 when it crashed near Adisutjipto International Airport, sustaining injuries which resulted in the amputation of both her legs.

== Early life and legal career ==
Banham was born and raised in Sydney. She studied a combined arts/law degree at Macquarie University and a graduate certificate in legal practice at University of Technology Sydney (UTS). She worked at a solicitor and paralegal for various firms, before giving up her legal career to become a writer and travelling for 18 months.

== Journalism career ==
In 1999, she began writing for Richard Ackland's online legal journals The Justinian and Gazette of Law and Journalism. In 2000, she was hired by The Sydney Morning Herald as a reporter, and was posted to the paper's Canberra bureau where she became a correspondent and columnist covering foreign affairs and defence. In 2004, she completed a master's degree in international affairs at UTS.

=== Garuda plane crash ===
In March 2007, Banham was sent to Jakarta, Indonesia by the Herald to cover an official visit by Alexander Downer, the Australian foreign affairs minister. On 7 March, she boarded Garuda Indonesia Flight 200, heading to Yogyakarta where she and other officials and journalists would return to Australia on a government jet.

Just before 7am, the aircraft attempted to land at Adisutjipto International Airport, but overshot the runway, crashing in a rice field. Banham was rescued from the wreckage, but had sustained a broken back and severe burns. Eighteen hours later, she was medically evacuated to Perth, Western Australia, where she was treated at the Royal Perth Hospital by burns expert Fiona Wood. An infection of the burn injuries resulted in the amputation of one leg and part of the other.

== Academic career ==
Banham left journalism in 2012, and pursued an academic career. She was granted a Doctor of Philosophy (PhD) from the Australian National University (ANU) in 2014, after completing a doctoral thesis supervised by legal scholar Hilary Charlesworth, on the responses of Australia, Canada and the United Kingdom towards the imprisonment and torture of their citizens by the United States during the "war on terror". Her thesis was adapted and published as Liberal Democracies and the Torture of their Citizens by Hart Publishing.

Banham was a post-doctoral fellow, and currently a visiting scholar at the Regulatory Institutions Network (Regnet), part of the College of Asia and the Pacific at ANU.

== Publications ==
In addition to the publication of her doctoral thesis, Banham also authored a memoir, A Certain Light, which parallels her family history (in particular her maternal grandfather Alfredo, an Italian military internee during World War II) with her own experiences in surviving the Garuda crash.

== Personal life ==
Banham met Michael Harvey, a journalist for the Herald Sun, in 2003 when they were both in the Canberra press gallery. They married in 2009, and their son was born in 2012.

A member and supporter of the Sydney Swans football team since 2007, Banham was made the team's number-one ticket holder and ambassador in October 2018 for the 2019 AFL season.
