= Punchbowl Boys High School =

Location
- Kelly Street; Punchbowl, New South Wales; Australia; 33°55′23″S 151°3′9″E

Information
- Type: Government-funded single-sex comprehensive secondary day school
- Motto: Facta non verba
- Established: 1955; 71 years ago
- Educational authority: New South Wales Department of Education
- Oversight: NSW Education Standards Authority
- Grades: 7–12
- Campus type: Suburban
- Website: punchbowlb-h.schools.nsw.gov.au

Punchbowl Boys High School is a public secondary school in Punchbowl, New South Wales, Australia, in Sydney.

== Academics ==
Punchbowl Boys High school is a public (state-run) secondary school educating students throughout years 7 to 12.

The school has departments for teaching English, Mathematics, Science, Languages, Music, HSIE (Human Society and Its Environment), PDHPE (Physical Development, Health, and Physical Education), TAS (Technologies), and Visual Arts, as well as other departments which facilitate student learning, such as 'Careers' and 'Teaching and Learning'. Each of these departments teach several subjects.

Apart from the above Higher School Certificate courses, Punchbowl High also offers some VET (Vocational Education and Training) courses.

== History ==
Punchbowl Boys was founded in 1955.

In the late 1990s, particularly between 1995 and 1999, the school suffered from intrusions by gang members and violence conducted by students, with Clifford Preece, the principal during the period, testifying to the NSW District Court of numerous incidents of student-perpetrated violence. However, as reported by Doherty & Burke (2003), Preece's successor Michael Glenday declared in 2003 that he had never experienced gang problems since becoming principal in 2000, and by 2003, the school had received "an additional deputy principal, Arabic and Pacific Islander liaison officers, a homework centre and security cameras", and was in the process of receiving $800,000 in extra funding and six extra teachers.

In 2007, Punchbowl Boys was rife with violence and disrespect among students, according to the new principal established that year, Jihad Dib. However, Dib initiated a broad program to improve this situation, which involved greeting every student arriving at school and the train station on the way, and involving the wider local community in many school events. As a result, from 2007 to 2013 enrolments almost doubled, the school's growth rate for numeracy was "among the highest in the country" (Rolfe 2013), and not a single expulsion occurred, with Dib professing that hostility had disappeared from among the students.

Chris Griffiths became the Principal of Punchbowl Boys in 2015. In 2017 Griffiths, a convert to Islam, lost his job when he declined to implement an anti religious-radicalisation programme mandated by New South Wales authorities. He had also not included female staff in certain events. Griffiths' deputy was also removed. His replacement, Robert Patruno, stated that he would teach Australian values to the students. Patruno formerly taught at a juvenile detention centre. The relationship between the school and the Bankstown police had deteriorated; Patruno sought to repair this relationship.

In 2017 it was reported that there had been an improvement in drug, alcohol and weapon-related violence at the school.

In May 2019, a former student of Canterbury Boys, along with a former student of Punchbowl Boys, were charged by the police for allegedly aiding ISIS back in 2014.

== Notable alumni ==
- Michael Mohammed Ahmad – novelist
- Steve Folkes – former rugby league player
- Angelo Gavrielatos OAM – advocate for teachers
- Mick Hawi – organised crime figure
- Len Pascoe – former cricket player
- Jeff Thomson – former cricket player
- Ridwaan Jadwat – Australian Ambassador
