= Michael Mohammed Ahmad =

Australian novelist and teacher

- Writing career
- Language: English
- Notable work: The Tribe (2014) The Lebs (2018)
- Notable awards: 2019 New South Wales Premier's Literary Award for Multiculturalism

Michael Mohammed Ahmad is an Australian novelist, teacher and community arts worker.

== Biography ==
Ahmad was born in Inner Sydney and attended Punchbowl Boys High School.

In 2012, Ahmad founded SWEATSHOP Western Sydney Literacy Movement, an arts organisation that promotes literacy in Western Sydney.

In 2014 he published his debut novel The Tribe with Giramondo. Ahmad has stated he was motivated to write The Tribe in order to counteract negative stereotypes about Arab Australians that flourished in Australia following the September 11 attacks.

In 2017 Ahmad received his Doctorate of Creative Arts at Western Sydney University.

In 2018 he published The Lebs with Hachette, which was shortlisted for the 2019 Miles Franklin Award.

Ahmad was nominated for NSW Young Person of the Year in 2022, recognising both his writing and literacy work.

== Bibliography ==
- The Tribe (Giramondo, 2014)
- The Lebs (Hachette Australia, 2018)
- After Australia (editor) (Affirm Press, 2020)
- The Other Half of You (Hachette Australia, 2021)
- Bugger (Hachette Australia, 2026)

== Awards ==
- Sydney Morning Herald Best Young Australian Novelists Award (2015) – winner
- New South Wales Premier's Literary Awards Multicultural NSW Award (2019) – winner
- Aurealis Award for best anthology (2020) – shortlisted for After Australia
- New South Wales Premier's Literary Awards Multicultural NSW Award (2021) – shortlisted for After Australia
- Miles Franklin Award (2022) – shortlisted for The Other Half of You
- Queensland Literary Awards The University of Queensland Fiction Book Award (2022) – winner for The Other Half of You
- Voss Literary Prize (2022) – shortlisted for The Other Half of You
