= The Book of Dirt =

2017 novel by Australian author Bram Presser

- Author: Bram Presser
- Language: English
- Genre: Literary novel
- Publisher: Text Publishing
- Publication date: 28 August 2017
- Publication place: Australia
- Media type: Print
- Pages: 300 pp.
- Awards: 2018 New South Wales Premier's Literary Awards — Christina Stead Prize for Fiction, winner
- ISBN: 9781925240269

The Book of Dirt is a 2017 novel by the Australian author Bram Presser originally published by Text Publishing.

It was the winner of the 2018 New South Wales Premier's Literary Awards, Christina Stead Prize for Fiction., and the 2018 Voss Literary Prize.

== Synopsis ==
The novel follows the narrator, named Bram Presser, as he seeks to understand the war-time experiences of his grandparents, Jakub Rand and Daša Roubíčková. Originally from Poland, they were deported from there to Theresienstadt, and later to the concentration camp at Auschwitz-Birkenau. Based on the couple's writings and correspondence, Presser attempts to document their life's journey.

== Critical reception ==
Reviewing the novel in Australian Book Review Anna MacDonald compared the structure and approach of Presser's novel to the work of W. G. Sebald: "As in Sebald’s prose narratives, Presser’s novel inhabits the dynamic region between fiction and non-fiction. The narrator is also named Bram Presser. The archive, and the problems associated with memory and historical representation are ever-present. The Book of Dirt integrates word-text alongside family photographs, reproductions of letters and archival documents, and pictures taken by the author, a number of which echo photographs that appear in Austerlitz."

Jerath Head, writing for Sydney Review of Books commented: "Presser draws strands together–historical, cultural, geographical, familial–to create something living, to prevent past atrocities from crystallising and slipping into memory as isolated events that don’t continue to effect the present. The Book of Dirt is both a loving, honest portrayal of lives that would have been erased, and an incorporation of the broader lessons of their experience into contemporary mythology."

== Awards ==
- 2018 New South Wales Premier's Literary Awards – Christina Stead Prize for Fiction, winner
- 2018 Voss Literary Prize winner

== See also ==
- 2017 in Australian literature
