= Unfinished Business: Paul Keating's Interrupted Revolution =

- Author: David Love
- Publisher: Scribe Publications
- Publication date: 2009
- ISBN: 978-1-921372-19-3

Unfinished Business: Paul Keating's interrupted revolution is a non-fiction economic/political book, by David Love. It is his account of the prime ministership of Australia of Paul Keating.

== Awards ==
It won the 2009 Gleebooks Prize for Critical Writing.

== Reviews ==
- "Paul Keating's golden circle David Love". The Australian. 6 August 2008.
- "Unfinished Business: Paul Keating's interrupted revolution". Australian Policy Online.
- Richard Allsop. "Superannuation and MacBank as the zenith of the Australian nation". The Institute of Public Affairs.

== Bibliography ==
- Unfinished Business: Paul Keating's Interrupted Revolution Scribe Publications, 2009,

ISBN 978-1-921372-19-3; Scribe Publications Pty Ltd., 2010, ISBN 978-1-921640-14-8
