= Bram Presser =

Australian author and musician (born 1976)

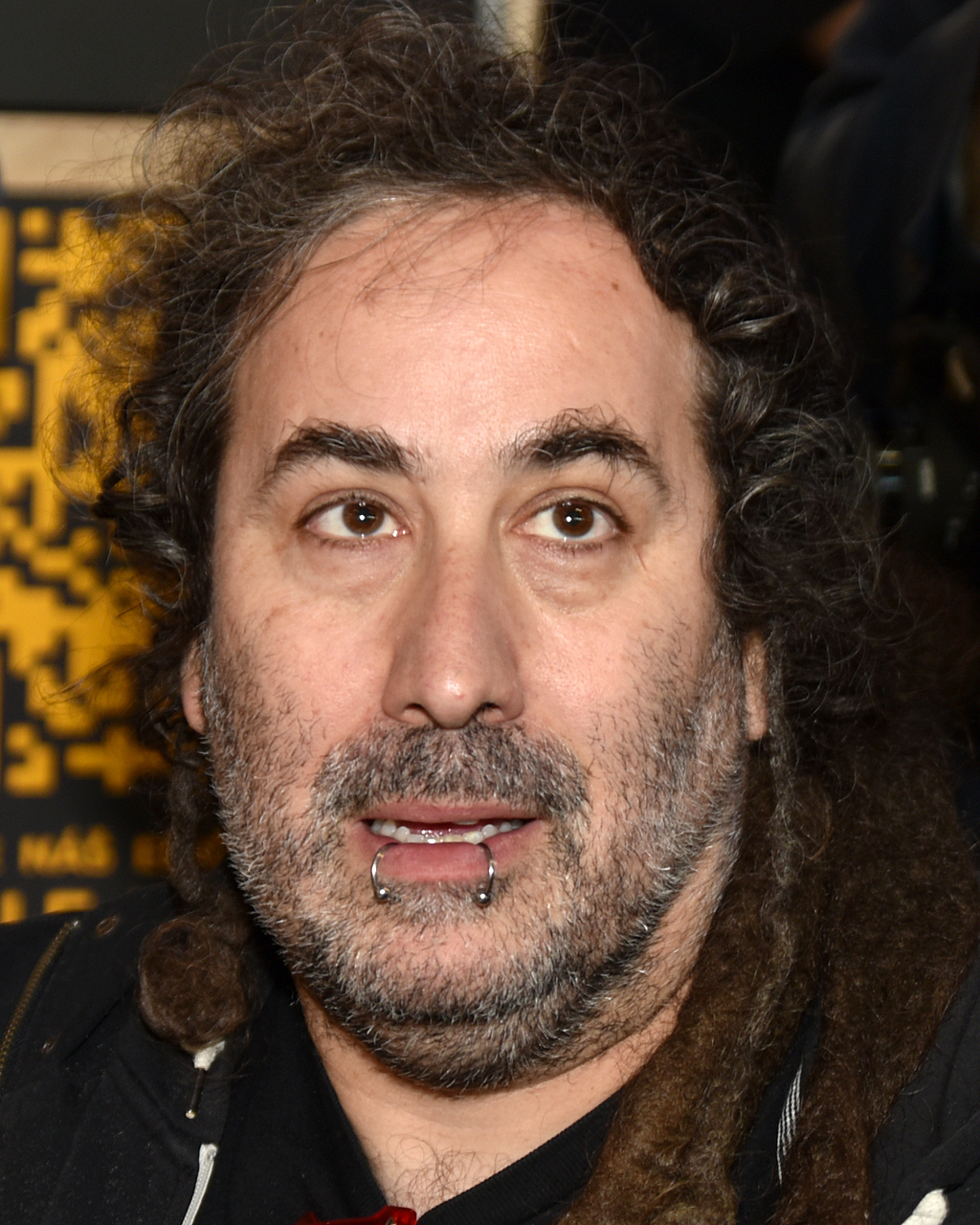
- Presser in 2023
- Born: 1976 (age 49–50)
- Occupations: Writer, musician
- Writing career
- Language: English
- Years active: 2011–present
- Notable awards: 2018 New South Wales Premier's Literary Awards — Christina Stead Prize for Fiction

Bram Presser (born 1976) is an Australian writer and musician, known for his involvement in the Melbourne music scene and Jewish community.

He fronted the Jewish punk rock prankster band Yidcore and was the singing voice for Mick Molloy in the 2006 Australian comedy film BoyTown. Following the breakup of Yidcore in December 2009, Presser turned to writing. He is a monthly columnist for The Australian Jewish News and is the author of the literary blog Bait For Bookworms.

His first short story, The Prisoner of Babel, was published in Volume 7 of The Sleepers Almanac and another story, Crumbs, won The Age Short Story Award for 2011. In an interview with The Age, Presser said the story was part of a novel he had been working on for several years.

In 2000, Presser was a Bachelor of Laws Prize recipient, being awarded the Butterworths Prize (Advanced Legal Research).

In 2007, Presser was painted by acclaimed Sydney artist and cardiologist Dennis Kuchar for the Archibald Prize.

In 2015 he appeared at the Melbourne Jewish Comedy Festival in the show "What’s So Funny? A Literary L’chaim"

On 28 August 2017 Presser released his first book, titled The Book of Dirt, a novel about love, family secrets and Jewish myths.

The Book of Dirt won three prizes in the 2018 NSW Premier's Literary Awards: the Christina Stead Prize for Fiction, the UTS Glenda Adams Award for New Writing, and the People's Choice Award. It also won the 2018 Voss Literary Prize. The Book of Dirt was published in the USA in 2018, where it won the National Jewish Book Award for Debut Fiction.

== Bibliography ==
- Esther : Outside the Box (2014) novella
- The Book of Dirt (2017) novel
