= The Life to Come (novel) =

Novel by Michelle de Kretser

- First edition
- Author: Michelle de Kretser
- Language: English
- Set in: Sydney
- Publisher: Allen and Unwin
- Publication date: 2017
- Pages: 375
- ISBN: 978-1-76029-656-8

The Life to Come is a novel by Michelle de Kretser.

The novel switches points of view between five loosely connected characters, all Australians. Sydney is the primary location of the novel's vignettes, but some take place in other parts of Australia, or in Paris, Sri Lanka, and other International locations.

In his review in The Guardian's Marcel Theroux wrote "The book is replete with examples of important things being forgotten, suppressed or misunderstood."

The New York Times review remarked on the satirical nature of the novel, and the pretentiousness of the characters' obsession with exotic food, with one character explaining privileged Australians are obsessed with food “Because they live in a country of no importance.”

In a review in The Financial Times Boyd Tonkin wrote "De Kretser writes about the aura and texture of places with breath-stopping virtuosity. 'Briny and fumy', her Sydney appears 'regulated and hygienic' but remains 'voluptuously receptive to chaos and filth'.
