= Sarah Krasnostein =

Australian writer

- Born: United States
- Occupation: Writer
- Notable works: The Trauma Cleaner, The Believer
- Notable awards: Victorian Prize for Literature, Australian Book Industry Award, Walkley Award for Feature Writing, Pascall Prize

Website
- sarahkrasnostein.com

Sarah Krasnostein is an American-born Australian non-fiction writer. She is known for her 2017 book The Trauma Cleaner.

== Early life and education ==
Born in the United States, Sarah Krasnostein completed a BA/LLB (honours) degree from the University of Melbourne in 2005. She was admitted as an attorney of the State of New York in 2006, and in 2009 she was admitted to practice law in Victoria, Australia.

She graduated with a PhD in criminal law from Monash University in 2016. Her thesis, "Pursuing Consistency: The Effect of Different Reforms on Unjustified Disparity in Individualised Sentencing Frameworks", was awarded the Mollie Holman Doctoral Medal for Law. Her research has been cited by the Victorian Court of Appeal, the Victorian Sentencing Advisory Council, and various academic journals.

== Writing ==
Krasnostein's first book, The Trauma Cleaner, was published in 2017. She spent four years researching the book, which is a work of narrative non-fiction about the life and work of Sandra Pankhurst.

Her second book, The Believer, was listed as one of the best books of 2022 by The New Yorker. Another work of narrative non-fiction, The Believer braids together the stories of six people from vastly different backgrounds. "The line between fact and fiction blurs to revelatory effect," wrote The New Yorker, "in this account of ghost hunters, death doulas, six-day creationists, U.F.O. investigators, and others who hold ideas at odds with, as the author judiciously puts it, 'more accepted realities'." The Washington Post called the book, "generous and compassionate. . . . Her talent for penetrating intimate settings and eliciting personal testimony is impressive. The profiles are fascinating."

== Recognition and awards ==
For The Trauma Cleaner, Krasnostein was awarded the Victorian Prize for Literature and the Prize for Non-Fiction at the 2018 Victorian Premier's Literary Awards, the Australian Book Industry Award for General Non-Fiction, the Dobbie Literary Award and the Douglas Stewart Prize for Non-Fiction at the NSW Premier's Literary Awards. For The Trauma Cleaner, Krasnostein was a finalist for the Melbourne Prize for Literature, the Walkley Book Award, the National Biography Award, and the Wellcome Book Prize (UK).

For The Believer, Krasnostein was shortlisted for the 2021 Nib Literary Award.

In 2022, she was awarded Australia's Pascall Prize for Arts Criticism for her television reviews for The Saturday Paper. The judges said, “In the time of Covid, Sarah Krasnostein explored the artistic possibilities of television, as it met our desires for distraction and connection. She evoked new dramatic landscapes, as well as cultural change. There was depth of reference, a sense of formal advance, dry wit, and emotional openness.”

Krasnostein was awarded the 2024 Walkley Award for long feature writing for her essay in The Monthly, "Peace in the Home: The Trial of Malka Leifer", about child abuser Malka Leifer.

The Mushroom Tapes (2025), co-authored with Helen Garner and Chloe Hooper, won the 2026 Australian Book Industry Awards General Nonfiction Book of the Year. It was also shortlisted for the 2026 Indie Book Awards Book of the Year – Non-Fiction.

== Works ==
=== Books ===
- —— (2017). The Trauma Cleaner: One Woman's Extraordinary Life in Death, Decay & Disaster. Text Publishing. ISBN 9781925410761.
- —— (2021). The Believer: Encounters with Love, Death & Faith. Text Publishing. ISBN 9781922330208.
- Garner, Helen; Hooper, Chloe; Krasnostein, Sarah (2025). The Mushroom Tapes: Conversations on a Triple Murder Trial. Text Publishing. ISBN 9781923058750.

=== Essay ===
- "Not Waving, Drowning: Mental Illness and Vulnerability in Australia", Quarterly Essay No. 85, 2022
- On Peter Carey, Black Inc Books, 2023

== Personal ==
Krasnostein is married to Australian comedian, Charlie Pickering.
