= TDK (disambiguation) =

TDK is a Japanese multinational electronics corporation established in 1935.

TDK may also refer to:

== Airports ==
- TDK, IATA airport code for Taldykorgan Airport, Kazakhstan

== Entertainment ==
- The Dark Knight, 2008 superhero film directed by Christopher Nolan

== Organisations ==
- TDK Australian Audio Book Awards, annual Australian awards ceremony established in 1988
- TDK Electronics, German subsidiary of TDK Corporation
- Turkish Language Association (Türk Dil Kurumu; TDK), regulatory body for the Turkish language

== People ==
- Tom De Koning (born 1999), Australian rules footballer for St Kilda and Carlton
- Mark Knight (musician) (fl. 1989; known alternatively as TDK), British musician, video game music composer and sound designer

=== Fictional characters ===
- Arm-Fall-Off-Boy ("the Detachable Kid"), featured in the 2021 film the Suicide Squad

== Teams ==
- Team Dragon Knights, disbanded League of Legends team
- Blaublitz Akita ("TDK SC"), Japanese association football team
