= TDK Australian Audio Book Awards =

The TDK Australian Audio Book Awards were established by the National Library of Australia in 1988 and sponsored by TDK from 1991. They were the leading audio book awards in Australia between 1989 and 1999, and were open to both commercial and non-commercial publishers.

The aims were: to improve the quality of Australian audio book production by recognising the achievements of the producers/publishers and narrators; to increase public awareness of books in this format; and to promote consumer access to a wide range of Australian audio books.

== Winners ==
| Year | Category | Title-Author | Narrator | Producer |
|---|---|---|---|---|
| 1989 | | A Circle of Quiet by Madeleine L'Engle | Irene Papas | Christian Blind Mission International |
| 1990 | Joint winner | Gone to Earth by Mary Webb | Anne Fraser | Hear a Book Service (Tasmania) |
| 1990 | Joint winner | The Great World by David Malouf | Bill Conn | Royal Blind Society of NSW |
| 1991 | Adult Literature and Overall Winner | Touching the Rock by John M. Hull | | Christian Blind Mission International |
| 1991 | Children's/Young Adult Literature | The Clinker by Roger Vaughan Carr | | Royal Blind Society of NSW |
| 1992 | Adult Literature and Overall Winner | Patrick White: A Life by David Marr | James Condon | Louis Braille Productions |
| 1992 | Children's/Young Adult Literature | The Dream by Rae Harris & Beryl Harp | Robert van Mackelenberg | Narkaling Productions |
| 1992 | Resource & Reference Materials | Overcoming Dyslexia by Bev Hornsby | Margaret Ford | Narkaling Productions |
| 1993 | Overall Winner and Adult Literature | The English Patient by Michael Ondaatje | Stanley McGeagh | Braille & Talking Book Library |
| 1993 | Children's Literature | Letters from the Inside by John Marsden | Denise Kirby and Sher Guhl | Royal Blind Society of NSW |
| 1993 | Resource & Reference | Massage & Myotherapy by Brian Tritton | Dr Meg Smith | TAFE Publications & the Royal Victorian Institute for the Blind |
| 1993 | Abridged Material | My Own Life by Hazel Hawke | Hazel Hawke | Text Publishing Company |
| 1994 | Overall Winner and Unabridged Fiction | White Eye: A Novel by Blanche d'Alpuget | Beverley Dunn | Louis Braille Books |
| 1994 | Abridged Fiction | More Favourite Play School Stories by Various traditional writers | Benita Collings, Noni Hazelhurst, John Hamblin, Alister Smart | ABC Enterprises |
| 1994 | Unabridged Non-Fiction | Questions of Rights: A Guide to the Law and Rights of People with an Intellectual Disability by Janice Connelly | Margaret Ford | Narkaling Productions |
| 1994 | Abridged Non-Fiction | Cry of the Damaged Man: A Personal Journey of Recovery by Tony Moore | Tony Moore | HarperCollins Audio Books |
| 1995 | Overall Winner and Unabridged Fiction | Dark Places by Kate Grenville | James Condon | Louis Braille Books |
| 1995 | Unabridged Non-fiction | Goodbye Girlie by Patsy Adam-Smith | Beverley Dunn | Louis Braille Books |
| 1995 | Abridged Non-fiction | Kings in Grass Castles by Mary Durack | Judy Dick and others | ABC Enterprises |
| 1995 | Abridged Fiction | Beastie Stories by Mark Dumbleton and others | Mark Mitchell | ABC Enterprises |
| 1996 | Overall Winner and Unabridged Fiction | The Riders by Tim Winton | Geoff Cartwright | Royal Blind Society |
| 1996 | Abridged Fiction | Foxspell by Gillian Rubinstein | Heather Steen | ABC Enterprises |
| 1996 | Unabridged Non-Fiction | Home Before Dark by Ruth Park and Rafe Champion | Peter Hosking | Louis Braille Books |
| 1996 | Abridged Non-Fiction | Kitchen Capers by The Australian Women's Weekly | Victoria Howell | Information Alternatives |
| 1996 | Special Award for an audiobook of outstanding quality aimed at a younger market | That Eye, The Sky by Tim Winton | Stig Wemyss | Bolinda Audio Books |
| 1996 | Special Commendation for an outstanding non-winning entry | Surviving Rape: A Handbook about Rape for Survivors, Family, Friends and Workers by Sydney Rape Crisis Centre | Jenny Vuletic | Redfern Legal Centre Publishing |
| 1997 | Unabridged Fiction (Children's) | Brown Ears at Sea by Steve Lawhead | Robert Grubb | Christian Blind Mission International |
| 1997 | Abridged Fiction | Eating Out and Other Stories by Natalie Scott | Ruth Cracknell | ABC Enterprises |
| 1997 | Abridged Non-Fiction | Fifty Years of Silence, by Jan Ruff-O'Herne | Jan Ruff-O'Herne | ABC Enterprises |
| 1997 | Unabridged Non-Fiction | Kings in Grass Castles, by Mary Durack | Jenny Seedsmanwas | Bolinda Audio Books |
| 1997 | The Trish Trinick Prize for the Best Narrator | The Fiftieth Gate by Mark Raphael Baker | James Wright | Louis Braille Books |
| 1997 | Special Commendation | Unna You Fullas by Glenyse Ward | Michelle Torres | Narkaling |
| 1998 | Abridged Audio Book | Picnic at Hanging Rock, by Joan Lindsay | Jacqueline McKenzie | ABC Enterprises |
| 1998 | Unabridged Fiction | The God of Small Things by Arundhati Roy | Jenny Vuletic | The Royal Blind Society |
| 1998 | Unabridged Non-Fiction | Dreamtime Alice by Mandy Sayer | Deidre Rubenstein | Louis Braille Books |
| 1998 | Audio Book for Young People | Blueback by Tim Winton | Stig Wemyss | Australian Large Print Audio & Video |
| 1998 | The Trish Trinick Prize for the Best Narrator | The God of Small Things, by Arundhati Roy | Jenny Vuletic | |
| 1998 | Special Award | The General Prologue to the Canterbury Tales by Geoffrey Chaucer | Henry Smith | Parkham Records |
| 1999 | Audiobooks for Young People | Staying Alive in Year 5 by John Marsden | Tim Ferguson | Pan Macmillan Australia |
| 1999 | Unabridged Fiction | Cold Mountain by Charles Frazier | Noel Hodda | Royal Blind Society |
| 1999 | Unabridged Non-Fiction | Caddie by Caddie | Helen Morse | Louis Braille Audio |
| 1999 | Narrator's Award (Trish Trinick Prize) | Oliver Twist by Charles Dickens | Edgar Metcalfe | Narkaling |
| 1999 | Special Award | Wonder Tales of Earth and Sea: Traditional Stories | Jenni Cargill | Jenni Cargill |
| 1999 | Marketing and Promotions Award | | | Bolinda Audio Books |
