= Sarah Thornhill =

Book by Kate Grenville

- First edition
- Author: Kate Grenville
- Language: English
- Genre: novel
- Publisher: Text Publishing, Australia
- Publication date: 2011
- Publication place: Australia
- Media type: Print (Hardback and Paperback)
- Pages: 307
- ISBN: 9781921758621
- Preceded by: The Lieutenant
- Followed by: A Room Made of Leaves

Sarah Thornhill (2011) is a novel by Australian author Kate Grenville. It is the sequel to the author's 2005 novel The Secret River.

It won the 2012 Australian Book Industry Awards (ABIA) — Australian General Fiction Book of the Year, and was shortlisted for the 2012 Prime Minister's Literary Awards.

== Plot summary ==
Sarah Thornhill is the last child born to William and Sal Thornhill, whose struggle to establish a new life in Australia was told in the author's novel The Secret River. Sarah's mother is now dead and her father has re-married, who attempts to conceal and overcome her husband's convict past. But Sarah has a will of her own and falls in love with Jack Langland, a "half darkie", the product of a white father and an Aboriginal mother.

== Notes ==
- Dedication: This novel is dedicated to the memory of Sophia Wiseman and Maryanne Wiseman, and their mother, 'Rugig'.
- Epigraph: "It does not follow that because a mountain appears to take on different shapes from different angles of vision, it has objectively no shape at all or an infinity of shapes." E. H. Carr.

== Reviews ==
Belinda McKeon in The Guardian noted: "It is with often marvellous vividness and clarity that Grenville evokes Sarah's world, from childhood on the Hawkesbury, through an adolescence of idealistic love, to a marriage towards which she goes with a resigned heart but of which she ultimately makes a fine hand."

Delia Falconer in The Monthly found that "Like its predecessors, Sarah Thornhill will be welcomed by many readers as just the story we need now; others may prefer a less comforting, more ambiguous version of the past."

== Awards and nominations ==
- 2012 winner Australian Book Industry Awards (ABIA) — Australian General Fiction Book of the Year
- 2012 longlisted Miles Franklin Award
- 2012 shortlisted New South Wales Premier's Literary Awards — Christina Stead Prize for Fiction
- 2012 shortlisted Prime Minister's Literary Awards — Fiction
- 2012 shortlisted Queensland Literary Awards — Fiction Book Award
- 2013 longlisted International Dublin Literary Award

== See also ==
- 2011 in Australian literature
