= The Lieutenant (novel) =

2008 novel by Kate Grenville

- First edition
- Author: Kate Grenville
- Language: English
- Genre: Historical
- Published: 2008 (The Text Publishing Company Grove Press
- Publication place: Australia
- Media type: Print
- Pages: 307 (Grove paperback edition)
- ISBN: 978-0-8021-4503-1 (Grove)
- Preceded by: The Secret River
- Followed by: Sarah Thornhill

The Lieutenant is a historical novel by Kate Grenville, published in 2008. The novel loosely follows historical facts based on the experiences of William Dawes, an officer of the Royal Marines who was on the 1788 First Fleet from England to the New South Wales colony. His position was astronomer, though he took an opportunity to observe and record the language of the Australian Aboriginal people (Eora) of the immediate area. It is implied that the events of the book connect to Grenville's other novel, The Secret River.

== Plot ==
Daniel Rooke (loosely based on Dawes) is a self-possessed boy whose parents seek to better his prospects in life by having him brought to the attention of important people, and thus given opportunities others of his station may not have had. Among them is the Astronomer Royal. He is a mathematical prodigy but must keep this to himself or else be victimized by adults and fellow students.

After graduating from the Royal Naval College, Portsmouth, he takes up a commission in the Royal Marines. During the American Revolutionary War, he is almost killed by a falling spar, and takes several years to recover.

Just before the First Fleet sails for what is to be the penal colony of New South Wales, he is invited by the Astronomer Royal to take instruments and observe the passage of a predicted comet. He accepts and is also in the company of another officer named Silk who he had known during the war.

As the astronomer, Rooke is given considerable freedom and constructs an observatory on a headland outside the colony's camp. Conflicted by internal struggles and driven by his desire to be undisturbed, he asks permission to establish his own hut in the vicinity of the observatory, remaining in it except when required to be at the camp or on routine, and for weekly meals to keep in contact with other officers.

Rooke creates a connection with the local Aboriginal people, and a young girl in particular: Tagaran, who teaches him words while also learning English. Rooke keeps several books written with his interpretations of the grammar and meanings of words he is taught. When Silk finds the books, he wants them to become part of his reports on the colony to a publisher in London and tries to bribe Rooke to agree with him.

A member of the colony is speared by Aboriginal People after what may have been an attempt to kill Aboriginal People. The Governor of New South Wales orders Silk to lead a party to kidnap six Aboriginal People. Rooke is ordered to accompany the party however he disagrees with the decision and shares the orders given to the party with Tagaran so she can warn her community.

On the first night of the expedition, after Rooke finds out their true intent was to murder six Aboriginal People by beheading them, he leaves the party in horror. Upon arriving back, he makes it clear to the governor how wrong his orders were and, as a consequence for refusing to follow them, Rooke is sent back to England for legal trial.

In England, Rooke is spared and spends the rest of his life in Antigua where he frees slaves.

== Publication history ==
2008, Australia, The Text Publishing Company ISBN, hardback

- 2008, USA, Grove Press ISBN 978-0-8021-4503-1, paperback

== Title explanation ==
The main character is a lieutenant in the Royal Marines at the time of the majority of the novel.

== Critical reception ==
The Lieutenant was very favourably received.

== Awards and nominations ==
- shortlisted NSW Premier's Literary Awards
- shortlisted Queensland Premier's Literary Awards
- shortlisted Western Australian Premier's Book Awards, 2008
- commended by Batman
