= The Idea of Perfection =

1999 novel by Kate Grenville

- First edition
- Author: Kate Grenville
- Language: English
- Genre: Literary fiction
- Publisher: Picador
- Publication date: 1999
- Publication place: Australia
- Media type: Hardback & paperback
- Pages: 401 pp
- ISBN: 0-330-39261-1
- OCLC: 44736512
- Preceded by: Dark Places
- Followed by: The Secret River

The Idea of Perfection is a 1999 novel by Australian author Kate Grenville.

== Synopsis ==
The novel is set in the fictional town of Karakarook, New South Wales. There Douglas Cheeseman, a shy engineer, is employed to pull down an old timber bridge so it can be replaced with a new concrete version. He meets Harley Savage, an outspoken museum curator who opposes his work.

== Critical reception ==
Writing in the Australian Book Review Don Anderson noted that the novel is a "love story, though it warms both heart and head, for the bliss it affords is not so much visceral as aesthetic, even architectural...The Idea of Perfection is written with the simultaneous complexity and simplicity of fine structural engineering – a Gladesville Bridge of a novel, though modest. Its own poetry appreciates the poetry of others."

A reviewer for Kirkus Reviews called the novel "Wonderful entertainment: a cockeyed romance that will have you cheering for all of these unlikely, wayward lovers."

== Notes ==
- "Dedication: For Tom and for Alice with love"
- "Epigraph: 'An arch is two weaknesses which together make a strength.' – Leonardo da Vinci "

== Publication history ==
After the novel's initial publication in Australia by Picador, it was reprinted as follows:

- Viking Books, USA, 2002
- Text Publishing, Australia, 2014
- Picador, UK, 2017

The novel was also translated into Dutch and Danish in 2002, and German in 2008.

== Awards and nominations ==
- Orange Prize for Fiction, 2001: winner

== See also ==
- 1999 in Australian literature
- Magdalena Bell interviewed Kate Grenville about the novel for the Compulsive Reader website
