= Kim Hyeon-jun (disambiguation) =

Kim Hyeon-jun (김현준) may refer to:

- Kim Hyun-jun (1960–1999), South Korean basketball player
- Kim Hyun-joon (tennis) (born 1987), South Korean tennis player
- Kim Hyun-joon (actor) (born 1991), South Korean actor and model
- Dimo Hyun Jun Kim (born 1991), South Korean musical theatre director
- Kim Hyeon-jun (born 1992), South Korean sports shooter
