= Comfort Women: A New Musical =

2015 musical about Korean comfort women

Comfort Women
- A New Musical
- Original Off-Broadway Cast album cover
- Music: Bryan Michaels and TaeHo Park
- Book: Dimo Hyun Jun Kim, Osker David Aguirre, and Joann Mieses
- Setting: 1941, Keijō (Seoul), Korea, Empire of Japan
- Basis: testimonies of former comfort women and Japanese war crimes of the IJA
- Premiere: July 31, 2015: St. Clements Theatre
- Productions: Dimo Kim Musical Theatre Factory

Comfort Women: A New Musical is a musical about the Korean comfort women who were sold as sex slaves for the Imperial Japanese Army during World War II. It is written and directed by Dimo Hyun Jun Kim, a South Korean theater director.

== Plot ==
The musical takes place in 1941, in Keijō (Seoul), Korea, Empire of Japan. The musical is about young Korean women from a small town in Korea who are ostensibly enlisted to work in a factory in Japan by a Japanese agent. Instead of working in the factory, the women are sent to a Japanese army camp in Indonesia. Goeun, a woman in Korea, is tricked by a man who promised her a good job in Tokyo. Instead, she is taken to Indonesia. Mr Komino, the Japanese agent who recruits the women, lies to the women that they will be working in a sugar factory in Japan, but he sells the women to the Army, to make money for himself, so the women can be used as sex slaves.

In the Japanese army camp, the women are cruelly abused to try to make them into sex slaves. Goeun becomes a sex slave for the Imperial Japanese Army. Goeun, Youngsun, Namsoon, Malsoon, Soonja, and Jinju are forced to service soldiers in Indonesia. The women are intermittently dragged out of stark, dim, wooden cells, to pleasure soldiers in military brothels. The women are told, "Your bodies now belong to the Great Imperial Army. You are to allow our soldiers to enjoy their time with you, as a reward for the hard work they are doing. Number two: Respect your soldiers; do not fight back. Number three: Failure to follow steps one and two are an automatic death sentence." After the women are imprisoned in the army camp, systematic rape by the Japanese soldiers is represented by a dance piece.

Minsik, a Korean serving in the Imperial Japanese Army, decides to help Goeun and the other women escape their Japanese captors. Minsik creates a way to take the women back to Korea. Most of the comfort women in the musical survive.

=== Plot rewrite ===
To empower the female characters, Kim rewrote part of the script in 2018, making the female characters, rather than the male soldier, plot their escape from the military brothel. The 2019 production of the musical has also reduced the violent scenes.

== Production ==
=== Format as a musical ===
While it may seem unusual to make a musical about a controversial and emotional issue such as this, Kim said that he only makes musicals. Kim said, "If I were a book writer, I may write a book about this. If I were a filmmaker, I may make a film about this." Kim said that he chose to tell the comfort women story in a musical, because a musical would convey the memory of comfort women in a more effective way than the vivid and brutal depictions of a documentary or play.

=== Basis ===
The musical is based on the testimonies of a few of the 200,000 women who were trafficked into sexual slavery by the Japanese military. The musical is based on the war crimes of the Imperial Japanese Army, where "comfort women" were promised high-paying jobs, but instead were taken to islands in Indonesia to where they were forced to become sex slaves for 50 to 100 soldiers daily. Although the escape plot is fictional, the rest of the story is based on the testimonies of former comfort women who appeared before a South Korean government commission in 2005. The Ellen Jansen character is based on Jan Ruff O'Herne.

On the musical's official website, the producers of the musical wrote, "approximately 200,000 'comfort women' were enlisted to serve about 50 to 100 men every day. The men were supposed to use condoms as a safety precaution, but this rule, along with the rule about age, was not enforced. Moreover, when the condom supply was running low, the soldiers would often save the used ones to wash and reuse later. As a result of these horrible practices, only 25 to 30 percent of women survived the war, and some of these women are still alive today."

=== Inspiration ===
In 2012, Kim was inspired to write the script when Shinzo Abe, Prime Minister of Japan, refused to acknowledge Japan's role in forcing women into sexual slavery. Kim recalled that in 2012 Japan started a campaign to dishonor the stories of comfort women, a campaign where Japan said that comfort women were prostitutes who had sex with Japanese soldiers of their own free will. Kim said that the Japanese government was trying to erase the histories of the comfort women. Kim said that he could not hold his anger when Shinzō Abe was talking about the comfort women in 2012. An August 20, 2019, article said that Kim believes that momentum for spreading awareness of comfort women has decreased, in the years since the musical's first run, due in part to the government of Japan's attempts to suppress the history of comfort women.

The musical is inspired by the testimonies of former comfort women. Although Kim could not find any testimonies of successful escapes, he decided to write an escape story.

=== Purpose ===
Kim said that his goal is not to demonize the Japanese. Kim said, "And I don’t want the audience to think Japan is the devil and Korea is the victim. I’m trying to show more that this is a human rights issue."

The purpose is not to receive apologies and reparations from the government of Japan. Kim said that he does not want the musical to be about the political issues surrounding comfort women.

Kim said, "It’s a story that has to be told." Kim said that his goal is to provide different perspectives of women, and have the audience learn more about this time period. The musical is an attempt to raise awareness about "comfort women." Kim said that he hopes that the audience will become interested in the topic and want to learn more about it. Kim said that the musical is about the comfort women victims. Kim said, "the older generations in Korea were somewhat weak-willed regarding striving for justice for these women; therefore, we are in dire need of the energy and passion of young people." Kim said, "In the past 70 years, Korea couldn't get an official apology from Japan. I believe that our generation has a responsibility to remind the world of the distorted history of sexual slavery and human rights. But, sexual slavery is not just a political problem between Korea and Japan. It is a global human trafficking issue from other countries as well. Victims from World War II are still alive and what's most troubling is that it's still happening in the world."

The Asian actors and actresses in the musical show that the comfort women, women who were tortured by the Imperial Japanese Army, were not only Korean but other Asian nationalities, such as Chinese.

Kim said that he added the Minsik Lee character to the musical to make the musical more accessible to the audience.

=== Funding ===
In a 2016 article, Kim said that the comfort women topic was risky, but he said that it paid off when he it got attention the Korean press, and he was approached by wealthy Korean producers and investors.

In a 2019 Kickstarter post, the musical said that they are desperate for funding, and the musical said that they are currently trying to get funding from various Korean organizations around Los Angeles.

A 2019 article said that Steve Chun, a distributor of Korean food in Los Angeles who grew up in South Korea, funded $50,000 for a 10-day run of the musical in Los Angeles.

=== Showings ===
The musical originally opened on July 31, 2015, at St. Clements Theatre. At the Peter Jay Sharp Theater, after a first preview on July 20, 2018, the musical ran from July 27, 2018, to September 2, 2018.

Yihui Shen, an associate producer of the musical, said that there are plans in the future to bring the musical to China.

Organizations representing former comfort women have stated that they are interested in having a production of the musical in South Korea.

=== Cast ===
Kim warned performers at auditions that they might be subject to backlash if they traveled to Japan, and a few performers at auditions declined the opportunity to be in the musical.

Matthew Thomas Burda, co-producer of the musical, said, "Our cast of 24 come from across the globe, including California, Nebraska, Ohio, Minnesota, Michigan, Maryland, Florida, Hawaii, and country’s including China, Tibet, Singapore, Philippines and Korea."

Cast
| Performers in 2018 | 2018 Performer's Ethnicity | Character's Name | Character's Ethnicity | About the Character | Gender | Plot Role |
|---|---|---|---|---|---|---|
| Abigail Choi Arader | mother from Korea | Goeun Kim | Korean | sexually enslaved | Female | Lead |
| Matheus Ting | Singaporean American | Minsik Lee | Korean | conflicted Korean soldier in the IJA, only man who shows any compassion | Male | Lead |
| Ben Wang | | Songwon Kim | Korean | against the Japanese invasion of Korea, tries to form a rebellion against the army, Goeun's brother, taken by Japanese soldiers | Male | Supporting |
| Sara Elizabeth States | | Youngsun Choi | Korean | sexually enslaved | Female | Supporting |
| Leana Rae Concepcion | Filipino | Namsoon Lee | Korean | sexually enslaved | Female | Supporting |
| Shuyan Yang | from Shanghai, recently moved to the US | Malsoon Lee | Korean | sexually enslaved | Female | Supporting |
| Roni Shelley Perez | | Soonja Ma | Korean | sexually enslaved | Female | Supporting |
| Emily Su | | Jinju Park | Korean | sexually enslaved | Female | Supporting |
| Sam Hamashima | mother Caucasian, father Japanese, 4th generation, Japanese American | Mr. Komino | Japanese | lies to women about them getting factory jobs, sells women to the Army, real-life villain, no care for women, obviously reprehensible | Male | Supporting |
| Tenzin Yeshi | Tibetan descent | Toshio | Japanese | real-life villain, no care for women, a "cruel, cruel man" | Male | Supporting |
| Kenny Mai | | Matsui | Japanese | real-life villain, no care for women, friend of Minsik, son of Hiroshi | Male | Supporting |
| Matthew Ting | | General Hiroshi | Japanese | father of Matsui, harsh stereotypical, approves enslavement of women | Male | Supporting |
| Mathew Bautista | Filipino | Nani | Indonesian | some comic relief, works for the Japanese, flamboyantly mincing | Male | Supporting |
| Chloe Rice | | Ellen Jansen | Dutch | sexually enslaved | Female | Supporting |

== Reception and reactions ==
In a 2015 article, Kim said that, over the past year, he received many death threats in Japanese, before opening the musical. Kim said, "I got so many death threats, people writing 'stop lying, stop distorting history.'"

On July 27, 2018, Kenji Fujishima, writing for TheaterMania, said that, although Japanese people should be condemned for sexually enslaving women, the musical demonizes Japanese people by denying them real-world complexity and making them one-dimensional villains.

On July 29, 2018, Shoshana Roberts, writing for Theatre is Easy, said that the musical is worth seeing for people interested in history and gender, and for World War II buffs, as it is a chance to learn about history that is not often discussed.

On July 29, 2018, Myra Chanin, writing for Theater Pizzazz, questioned how a musical can ever come close to showing the agony of the 200,000 to 400,000 Korean girls who were raped and beaten, daily and nightly, by soldiers who felt entitled to their services. Chanin said that the subject needs to be shown in a documentary film format rather than a musical.

On July 18, 2019, BroadwayWorld said that the musical received critical acclaim for showing the horrific stories of "comfort women," and having an all-Asian off-Broadway cast directed by a native of East Asia. Broadway World nominated the musical for Best Off-Broadway musical.

On August 13, 2019, the LAist wrote an article about the musical being in Los Angeles. On August 16, 2019, the article was updated with a statement from the Consulate-General of Japan in Los Angeles, which stated, "The Government of Japan recognizes that the issue known as comfort women is one that severely injured the honor and dignity of many women. The Government of Japan has extended its sincere apologies and remorse to all those women known as comfort women who suffered immeasurable pain and incurable physical and psychological wounds." The statement further said that the government of Japan "will also continue its effort to ensure that Japan's views and efforts on the comfort women issue are properly recognized by the international community based on an objective understanding of relevant facts."

== See also ==
- Spirits' Homecoming
- I Can Speak
- Herstory
