= GenCell =

GenCell Ltd.
- Type: Public
- Traded as: Tel Aviv Stock Exchange
- Industry: Fuel cells; Hydrogen energy; Backup power
- Founded: 2011
- Founders: Rami Reshef, Genaddy Finkelshtain, Gil Shavit
- Headquarters: Petah Tikva, Israel
- Products: Fuel cell systems; hydrogen-based generators; ammonia-based power solutions
- Services: Backup power; off-grid energy solutions
- Website: www.gencellenergy.com

GenCell Ltd. is an Israeli company developing hydrogen alkaline based fuel cell systems and solutions that replace diesel generators with clean backup power for utilities, homeland security, healthcare and automated industries, as well as Ammonia (NH3) based off-grid power solutions.

== History ==
GenCell Ltd was founded in 2011 by Rami Reshef, Genaddy Finkelshtain and Gil Shavit. The company is headquartered in Petah Tikva. In 2016, GenCell introduced the G5 line of hydrogen gas-powered backup generators to provide power in areas lacking centralized electricity

TDK Corporation and GenCell began collaborating in 2017 to develop and produce an ammonia- based solution. The collaboration involved GenCell's material sciences knowledge and TDK's manufacturing capabilities.

In 2018, GenCell introduced the A5 fuel cell as an alternative to diesel generators. In 2020, GenCell Ltd joined the Tel Aviv Stock Exchange

In 2021, GenCell Ltd began deploying its A5 cell to power an advanced test unit at an emergency communications system station in Iceland.

== Technology ==
The company developed a process to create hydrogen-on-demand from anhydrous ammonia (NH3), which enables its fuel cell solutions to also provide primary power for off-grid and poor-grid sites, as well as rural electrification.

The company has non-noble metal catalysts patents that enable it to reduce the material costs, and liquid electrolyte (KOH), making the fuel cell solutions for backup and off-grid power to operate in a vast range of weather conditions.

GenCell developed a number of patented technologies, including the use of a non-platinum catalyst, mechanisms for using ambient air as an oxidizer (instead of pure oxygen), and using lower-cost fuels such as industrial-grade hydrogen gas or anhydrous liquid ammonia.

GenCell is field testing prototypes of small scale fuel cells fueled by ammonia. This ammonia-to-energy technology will provide clean energy users with another alternative.

== Cost ==
A GenCell A5 4 kW generator costs 60,000-70,000 USD. GenCell estimates that local production of ammonia will help reduce energy production costs, and will allow its generators to run at 70 cents per kWh.
