= Fifty Years of Silence =

Book by Jan Ruff O'Herne

- First edition
- Author: Jan Ruff O'Herne
- Language: English
- Genre: Non-fiction
- Published: 1994
- Publisher: Tom Thompson
- Publication place: Australia
- ISBN: 1875892001
- OCLC: 609506903

Fifty Years of Silence: The Extraordinary Memoir of a War Rape Survivor is a personal memoir written by Jan Ruff O'Herne, a "comfort woman" who was forced into sexual slavery by the Imperial Japanese Army.

== Reception ==
In 1997, it won the TDK Australian Audio Book Award in the category of Abridged Non-Fiction.

Richard Tanter, referring to the dismissive responses in 2007 by proponents of "Japanese restorationist nationalism" including Koike Yuriko later Japan's defense minister, and then Prime Minister Abe Shinzo, said that the unwillingness to admit these events made Japan "The sick man of Asia". He describes the book and the events it narrates in some detail, referring to it as "her remarkable book, Fifty Years of Silence".
