= Restless Dolly Maunder =

2023 novel by Kate Grenville

- Author: Kate Grenville
- Language: English
- Genre: Historical fiction
- Publisher: Text (Australia and New Zealand); Canongate (rest of world)
- Publication date: 18 July 2023
- Publication place: Australia
- Media type: Print (hardback, paperback)
- ISBN: 978-1-9227-9065-1

Restless Dolly Maunder is a 2023 novel by Australian author Kate Grenville. The novel is a fictionalised story based on the life of her maternal grandmother, the titular Dolly Maunder, who was born in New South Wales at the end of the 19th century.

== Background ==
Grenville said the book came from seeing old photos of her female ancestors and "[wanting] to rescue one of them from those impassive silent images and bring her to life". She was also prompted to write her grandmother's story after her mother asked shortly before her death: "Why did my mother never love me?". The novel is a companion to One Life: My Mother's Story, Grenville's 2015 non-fiction account of her mother Nancy's life.

== Plot ==
Dolly Maunder is born in 1881 to a poor farming family in Currabubula, New South Wales. She loves school and looks up to her female teacher but once she is 14, she has to leave school to work at home under her controlling and violent father who prevents her from becoming a pupil-teacher. Dolly marries Bert Russell and they move off the farm, first to Gunnedah then to state's cities, running different businesses and pushed by Dolly's ambition. Bert is unfaithful but believes in Dolly's abilities and teaches her to drive, giving her newfound freedom. They make enough to send their children to private school and Dolly has high ambitions for her own daughter Nancy which leads to a strained relationship. When the Great Depression begins and business suffers, Dolly and Bert end up moving back to a rural farm. After the Second World War, Dolly moves in with Nancy, now a hospital pharmacist and married to a solicitor, and helps to care for her three grandchildren, including Cathy, a five-year-old Grenville.

== Publication ==
The book was first commissioned by Audible before a new extended version was acquired by Text Publishing. It was published in Australia on 18 July 2023. The rights to global English-language publication, excluding Australia and New Zealand, were then acquired by Ellah Wakatama for Canongate, to be published in November 2023. Text Publishing released a paperback version on 30 April 2024.

== Reception ==
Sarah Moss writing for the Times Literary Supplement commends Grenville's ability to present "complex textures of experience without losing the rhythm ... of realist fiction" and notes there being no reference to Indigenous Australians except in an afterword. Grenville, who is known for writing about the colonisation of Australia, commented that "the family stories are silent about that truth".

Some commenters noted that Grenville's fictionalisation of her grandmother's life meant that assumptions had to be made. In a review for the Journal of the Association for the Study of Australian Literature, Louise Henry says that the story "becomes an inescapable appropriation of [Dolly's] life" and asks whether Grenville was uncomfortable about using her grandmother's life in that way. Kirsten Tranter writing in The Guardian says that Grenville writes her grandmother's story "in her clear-sighted way" and that "the answers proposed here are all too believable".

The novel was nominated for several awards, being shortlisted for the Women's Prize for Fiction, the Prime Minister's Literary Awards and the Margaret and Colin Roderick Literary Award in 2024. It also made the longlist for the ARA Historical Novel Prize and the Indie Award Fiction Book of the Year.
