= Patsy Adam-Smith =

Australian author, historian and servicewoman

Patsy Adam-Smith AO OBE
- Born: Patricia Jean Smith; 31 May 1924; Nowingi, Victoria
- Died: 20 September 2001 (aged 77); Melbourne, Victoria
- Occupation: Non-fiction writer
- Writing career
- Language: English
- Period: 1964–1994
- Subjects: Australian history Australian culture and identity
- Notable works: The Anzacs (1978); Australian Women at War (1984); Prisoners of War (1992)
- Notable awards: The Age Non-fiction Award (1978); Officer of the Order of the British Empire (1980); Order of Australian Association Book Prize (1993); Officer of the Order of Australia (1994); Benalla Award for Audio Book of the Year (1995); TDK Australian Audio Book Unabridged Non-Fiction Award (1995)

Patricia Jean Adam-Smith, AO, OBE (31 May 1924 – 20 September 2001) was an Australian author, historian and servicewoman. She was a prolific writer on a range of subjects covering history, folklore and the preservation of national traditions, and wrote a two-part autobiography. Her other notable works include The Anzacs (1978), Australian Women at War (1984) and Prisoners of War (1992).

== Life ==
Born out of wedlock, Patricia Jean Smith was adopted by railway workers, her mother a caretaker and her father a ganger. She lived in a number of small Victorian country towns and was educated at small country schools. She enlisted as a nursing Voluntary Aid Detachment (VAD) during the Second World War, serving from 17 March 1943 to 14 July 1944. Later, she was the first female Australian articled seaman when she worked on an Australian merchant ship from 1954 to 1960 and trained as a radio operator. She then lived in Hobart, Tasmania, from 1960 to 1967, where she worked as an Adult Education Officer. In 1970, she took the position of Manuscripts Field Officer for the State Library of Victoria, a job she held until 1982.

From 1976 to 2001, Adam-Smith was a member of the Board of Directors for the Royal Humane Society Australasia, and from 1983 to 2001 she was a Committee Member of the Museum of Victoria. Her appointment as an Officer of the Order of Australia in 1994 was made in recognition of her service to community history, particularly through the preservation of national traditions and folklore and the recording of oral histories.

While her main study of and work in oral history was carried out in Australia, Ireland, England and the United States, Adam-Smith's research took her to over 60 countries.

== Literary career ==
Adam-Smith wrote on a wide range of subjects, but her deepest interest was Australian railways. She contributed actively to Australia's literary community, and in 1973 she was State President of Australian Writers in Victoria and the Federal President of the Fellowship of Australian Writers.

In 1978 her book The Anzacs shared The Age Book of the Year Award and was made into a 13-part TV series.

Her autobiography was published in three parts: Hear The Train Blow, the award-winning Good-bye Girlie, and There was a Ship.

== Awards ==
- 1978: The Age Book of the Year Award for The Anzacs
- 1980: Appointed Officer of the Order of the British Empire
- 1993: Order of Australian Association Book Prize for Prisoners of War
- 1994: Awarded an Officer of the Order of Australia
- 1995: Audiobook of the Year, Benalla Award, for Good-bye Girlie
- 1995: TDK Australian Audio Book Awards, Unabridged Non-Fiction Category, for Good-bye Girlie

== Bibliography ==
- Hear the Train Blow: An Australian Childhood, Ure Smith, 1964
- Moonbird People, Rigby, 1965
- There was a Ship, Rigby, 1967
- Hobart Sketchbook (with drawing by Max Angus), Rigby, 1968
- Tiger Country, Rigby, 1968
- The Rails Go Westward, Macmillan of Australia, 1969
- Folklore of the Australian Railwaymen (collected and edited), Macmillan of Australia, 1969
- No Tribesman, Rigby, 1971
- Across Australia by Indian-Pacific, Thomas Nelson, c1971
- The Barcoo Salute, Rigby, 1973
- Launceston Sketchbook (with drawing by Arthur Phillips), Rigby, 1973
- Romance of Australian Railways, Rigby, 1973
- The Desert Railway, Rigby, 1974
- Neon Signs to the Mutes: Poetry by Young Australians (ed. with Michael Dugan and J.S. Hamilton), Fellowship of Australian Writers and BHP,1976
- Footloose in Australia, Rigby, 1977
- Historic Tasmania Sketchbook (with text by Joan Woodberry, and drawings by Max Angus, Frank Mather and Arthur Phillips), Rigby, 1977
- Port Arthur Sketchbook (with drawings by Arthur Phillips), Rigby, 1977
- Tasmania Sketchbook (with drawing by Max Angus), Rigby, Adelaide, 1977
- Trader to the Islanders (originally published as There was a Ship), Rigby, 1977
- The ANZACS, Thomas Nelson (Australia), 1978
- Islands of Bass Strait (with photographs by John Powell), Rigby, 1978
- Victorian and Edwardian Melbourne from Old Photographs, John Ferguson, 1979
- Romance of Victorian railways, Rigby, 1980
- Hear the Train Blow: Patsy Adam-Smith's Classic Autobiography of Growing Up in the Bush, Nelson, 1981
- Outback Heroes, Lansdowne Press, 1981
- The Shearers, Nelson, 1982
- When We Rode the Rails, Lansdowne, 1983
- Australian Women at War, Nelson, 1984
- Heart of Exile: Ireland, 1848, and the Seven Patriots Banished..., Nelson, 1986
- Australia: Beyond the Dream-time, William Heinemann Australia, 1987
- Prisoners of War, Viking,1992
- Trains of Australia: All Aboard, Australia Post, c1993,
- Goodbye Girlie, Viking, 1994

== See also ==
- Australian outback literature of the 20th century
