= TDK Electronics =

Manufacturer of electronic components

TDK Electronics AG
- Company type: Aktiengesellschaft
- Industry: Electronics
- Founded: 1999
- Headquarters: Munich, Bavaria, Germany
- Key people: Dr. Werner Lohwasser, Speaker of the Management Board
- Products: Capacitors and Inductors; Sensors; Protection Devices; Power EMC Filters; Transponder Chokes
- Revenue: €1.8 billion (FY 2022)
- Number of employees: 24,100 (FY 2022)
- Parent: TDK Corporation
- Website: www.tdk-electronics.tdk.com

TDK Electronics AG (formerly EPCOS AG) is a German manufacturer of electronic components, modules, and systems. It is a subsidiary of Japan-based TDK Corporation.

== Company history ==
The company was created as EPCOS AG in 1999 from Siemens Matsushita Components, which was a joint venture of Siemens and Matsushita in 1989. The stock opened on 15 October 1999 at the same time in Frankfurt and New York City, with Siemens and Matsushita holding interests of 12.5% each. In 2006, Siemens sold its shares of EPCOS. In October 2006, Matsushita also sold its holdings. TDK Corporation agreed to acquire a controlling stake in the company on 31 July 2008. After complete acquisition of EPCOS by TDK on October 1, 2009, the TDK-EPC cooperation, with about 36,000 employees worldwide, was founded in Japan.

== Products ==
TDK Electronics' portfolio includes capacitors, ceramic components, EMC filters, inductors, non-linear resistors, surge arresters, and ferrites.

== Locations ==
In Germany, TDK Electronics has production locations in Heidenheim an der Brenz (inductors and capacitors) and Berlin (sensors). Worldwide, TDK Electronics operates production facilities in Brazil (Gravatai), Spain (Málaga), India (Bawal, Nashik, Kalyani), Hungary (Szombathely), Austria (Deutschlandsberg), United States (Dallas), Czech Republic (Šumperk), Malaysia, Singapore, Indonesia, and China.
