= Dimo Hyun Jun Kim =

South Korean theater director (born 1991)

Dimo Hyun Jun Kim (Dimo Kim)
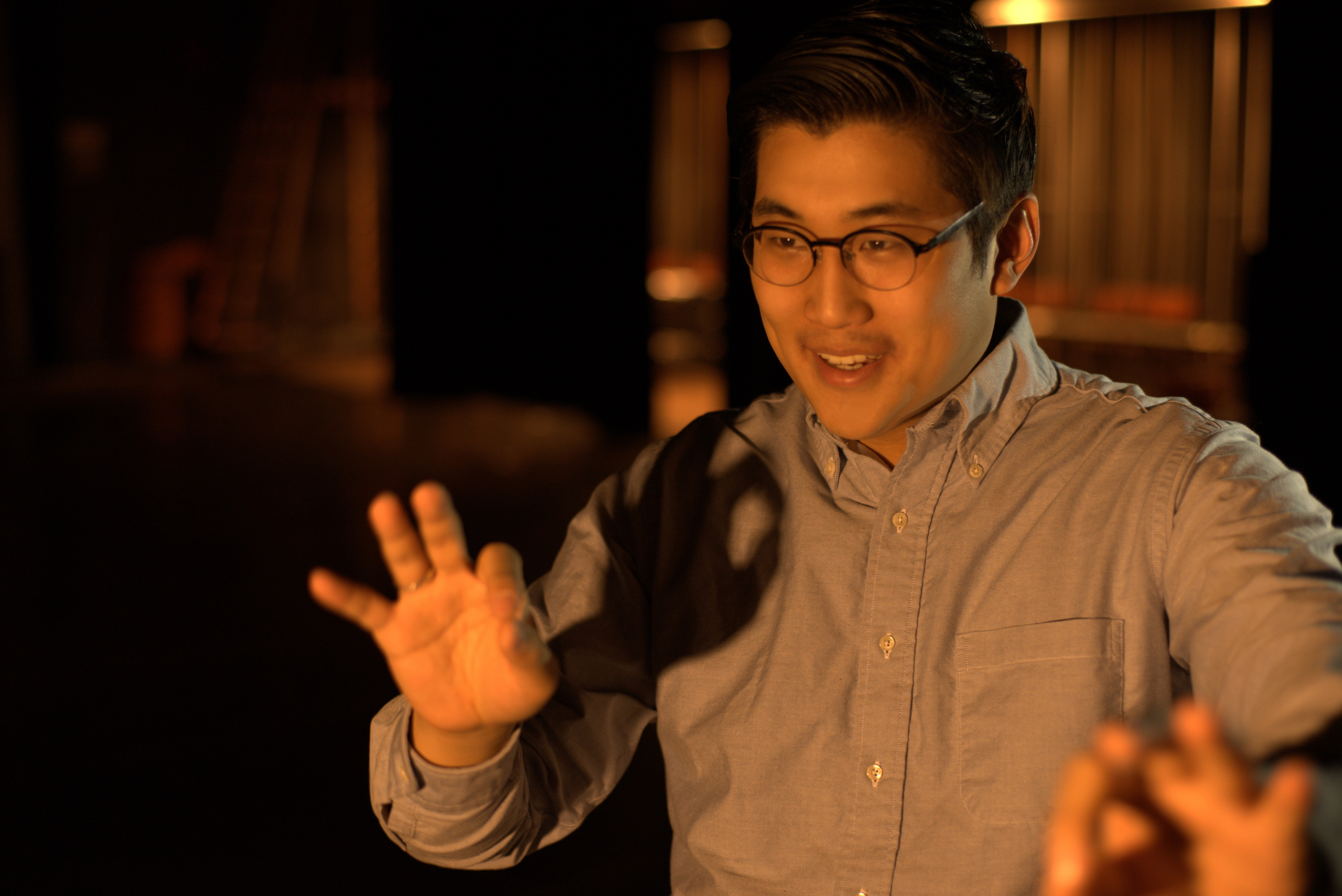
- Dimo Hyun Jun Kim in New York City, 2015
- Born: 21 May 1991; Seoul, South Korea
- Education: Columbia University
- Movement: Asian Musical Theatre
- Website: www.dimokim.com

- Dimo Hyun Jun Kim
- Hangul: 김현준
- Hanja: 金鉉埈
- RR: Gim Hyeonjun
- MR: Kim Hyŏnjun

Dimo Hyun Jun Kim (Korean: 김현준; born May 21, 1991) is a theatre director and producer from Seoul, South Korea. He is a member of the Stage Directors and Choreographers Society and a founding Artistic Director, Chairman of Dimo Kim Musical Theatre Factory LLC.

Dimo made his Off-Broadway debut on July 31, 2015 when "Comfort Women: A New Musical" opened at the Theatre at St. Clement's. This marks the first all-Asian off-Broadway cast to be led by an East Asian national. The musical follows several Korean women characters tricked into working at comfort stations in Indonesia.

Other credits include Interview: A New Musical, Green Card: A New Musical, See What I Wanna See, A Midsummer Night's Dream, As You Like It, West Side Story, Luxury of Love Letters, Advice to the Players, The Cherry Orchard, Godspell, The Upper Lip, Finding My Way Back Home, Promenade, Life is a Dream, West Side Ballad, Our Town, Joseph And The Amazing Technicolor Dreamcoat, Spring Is Arising and Jesus Christ Superstar.
