= Dark Places (Grenville novel) =

1994 novel by Australian author Kate Grenville

- Author: Kate Grenville
- Language: English
- Genre: Literary novel
- Publisher: Macmillan
- Publication place: Australia
- Media type: Print
- Pages: 375 pp.
- Awards: 1995 Victorian Premier's Prize for Fiction, winner
- ISBN: 0732907896

Dark Places is a 1994 novel by the Australian author Kate Grenville. The novel is also known by the title Albion's Story.

It was the winner of the 1995 Victorian Premier's Prize for Fiction.

== Synopsis ==
Rather than being a sequel this novel re-tells the story of the author's earlier work, Lilian's Story, from the point of view of Albion Gidley Singer, the father. Singer was the patriarchal villain of the earlier novel, bully and rapist.

== Critical reception ==
Kerryn Goldsworthy, writing in Australian Book Review noted: "Readers who appreciated Lilian's Story, of whom there are many, won't be disappointed by Dark Places, but it will make them profoundly uncomfortable."

In The Independent Maggie Traugott concluded: "What is so impressive in both novels is the force Grenville marshals to reveal character: the pellucid confession, the dialogue's stinging wit, the eloquence of descriptive detail."

== See also ==
- 1994 in Australian literature

== Notes ==
- Dedication: For Isobel

== Publication history ==
After the novel's initial publication in Australia by Macmillan it was reprinted as follows:

- Picador, UK, 1994
- Harcourt Brace, USA, 1994
- Picador, Australia, 1995
- Text Publishing, Australia, 2008 and 2012

== Awards ==
- 1995 Victorian Premier's Prize for Fiction, winner
- 1995 Miles Franklin Award, shortlisted
