= Jan Ruff-O'Herne =

Dutch–Australian activist for rape victims (1923–2019)

Jan Ruff-O'Herne AO
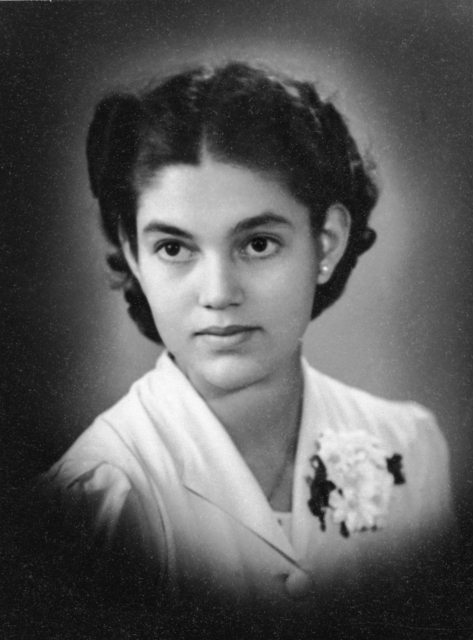
- Portrait taken in March 1942, shortly before the Japanese invasion of Indonesia
- Born: 18 January 1923; Bandoeng, Dutch East Indies
- Died: 19 August 2019 (aged 96); Adelaide, South Australia
- Spouse: Tom Ruff
- Awards: Knight (2001), Order of Orange-Nassau; Centenary Medal (2001); Officer, Order of Australia (2002); Dame Commander (2002), Order of St. Sylvester

Jeanne Alida "Jan" Ruff-O'Herne AO (18 January 1923 – 19 August 2019) was a Dutch Australian of Irish ancestry and human rights activist known for campaigning internationally against war rape. During World War II, Ruff-O'Herne was forced into sexual slavery by the Imperial Japanese Army. After remaining silent for fifty years, Ruff-O'Herne spoke out publicly from the 1990s until her death to demand a formal apology from the Japanese government and to highlight the plight of other "comfort women". On her death, the South Australian Attorney-General noted: "her story of survival is a tribute to her strength and courage, and she will be sorely missed not only here in South Australia, but around the world."

== Biography ==
Ruff-O'Herne was born in 1923 in Bandung in the Dutch East Indies, then a colony of the Dutch Empire. She grew up as a devout Catholic. During the Japanese occupation of the Dutch East Indies, Ruff-O'Herne and thousands of Dutch women were forced into hard physical labor at a prisoner-of-war camp at a disused army barracks in Ambarawa, Indonesia. In February 1944, high-ranking Japanese officials arrived at the camp and ordered all single girls seventeen years and older to line up. Ten girls were chosen; Ruff-O'Herne, twenty-one years old at the time, was one of them. Ruff-O'Herne and six other young women were taken by Japanese officers to an old Dutch colonial house at Semarang. The girls thought they would be forced into factory work or used for propaganda. They soon realized that the colonial house was to be converted to a military brothel. Ruff-O'Herne got the signature of each girl that night on a small white handkerchief and embroidered it in different colours which she kept for fifty years and referred to it in her writing as precious "secret evidence of the crimes done to us".

On their first day, photographs of the women were taken and displayed at the reception area. The soldiers picked the girls they wanted from the photographs. The girls were all given Japanese names; all were names of flowers. Over the following three months, the women were repeatedly raped and beaten.

Ruff-O'Herne fought against the soldiers every night and even cut her hair to make herself ugly to the Japanese soldiers. Cutting her hair short had the opposite effect, however, making her a curiosity. Shortly before the end of World War II, the women were moved to a camp in Bogor, West Java, where they were reunited with their families. The Japanese warned them that if they told anyone about what happened to them, they and their family members would be killed. While many of the young girls' parents guessed what had happened, most remained silent, including Ruff-O'Herne.

After the war ended and Ruff-O'Herne was liberated, she met Tom Ruff, a member of the British military. The two were married in 1946. After living in Britain, the couple emigrated to Australia in 1960 where they raised their two daughters, Eileen and Carol. In letters she wrote to Tom prior to her marriage, Ruff-O'Herne had alluded to what had happened to her during the war and asked for his patience if they were to be married. For decades after the war, Ruff-O'Herne continued to have nightmares and feel fearful, especially during sexual relations with her husband. They had a good marriage but Ruff-O'Herne's experience as a comfort woman continually affected her life.

In 2001 Ruff-O'Herne received a Centenary Medal for being a "campaigner and advocate for human rights and the protection of women in war." In 2002 she was made an Officer in the Order of Australia for being an "advocate for human rights and the protection of women in war, and for leadership in encouraging articulation of war-related atrocities." Ruff-O'Herne died in Adelaide on 20 August 2019, aged 96. The character Ellen Jansen in Comfort Women: A New Musical is based on Ruff-O'Herne.

== Human rights activism ==
In the decades after the war, Ruff-O'Herne did not speak publicly about her experience until 1992, when three Korean comfort women demanded an apology and compensation from the Japanese government. Inspired by the actions of these women and wanting to offer her own support, Ruff-O'Herne decided to speak out as well. At the invitation of the Foundation of Japanese Honorary Debts, Ruff-O'Herne broke her silence and shared her story at the International Public Hearing on Japanese War Crimes in Tokyo in December 1992. In 1994 Ruff-O'Herne published a personal memoir titled Fifty Years of Silence, which documents the struggles that she faced while secretly living the life of a war rape survivor.

In 1998 the Asian Women's Fund project for Dutch victims was formally established. Although 79 Dutch women accepted Japan's apology and atonement money, Ruff-O'Herne considered the fund an insult and refused the compensation offered, wanting Japan to come to terms with its history and offer a sincere apology. From 1992 Ruff-O'Herne continued to work for the "plight of the Comfort Women and for the protection of women in war." In September 2001 she was awarded the Order of Orange-Nassau by the Government of the Netherlands in recognition of this work.

=== United States congressional hearing ===
On 15 February 2007 Ruff-O'Herne appeared before the United States House of Representatives as part of a congressional hearing on "Protecting the Human Rights of Comfort Women":

Many stories have been told about the horrors, brutalities, suffering and starvation of Dutch women in Japanese prison camps. But one story was never told, the most shameful story of the worst human rights abuse committed by the Japanese during World War II: The story of the "Comfort Women", the jugun ianfu, and how these women were forcibly seized against their will, to provide sexual services for the Japanese Imperial Army... ...I have forgiven the Japanese for what they did to me, but I can never forget. For fifty years, the “Comfort Women” maintained silence; they lived with a terrible shame, of feeling soiled and dirty. It has taken 50 years for these women's ruined lives to become a human rights issue. I hope that by speaking out, I have been able to make a contribution to world peace and reconciliation, and that human rights violation against women will never happen again.

— Statement by Jan Ruff O'Herne at a 2007 United States congressional hearing

== Bibliography ==
=== Books ===
- Ruff-O'Herne, Jan (1994). Fifty years of silence. Sydney: Editions Tom Thompson.

=== Essays and chapters ===
- Ruff-O'Herne, Jan (2005). "Fifty years of silence : cry of the raped". In Durham, Helen and Tracey Gurd (eds). (ed.). Listening to the silences : women and war. Leiden: Martinus Nijhoff. pp. 3–8.
- — (2014). "Fifty years of silence : cry of the raped" (PDF). International Humanitarian Law Magazine (2): 6–7. Archived (PDF) from the original on 17 May 2017. Abridged version of Ruff-O'Herne (2005).
