= Kate Grenville =

Australian author (born 1950)

Kate Grenville AO
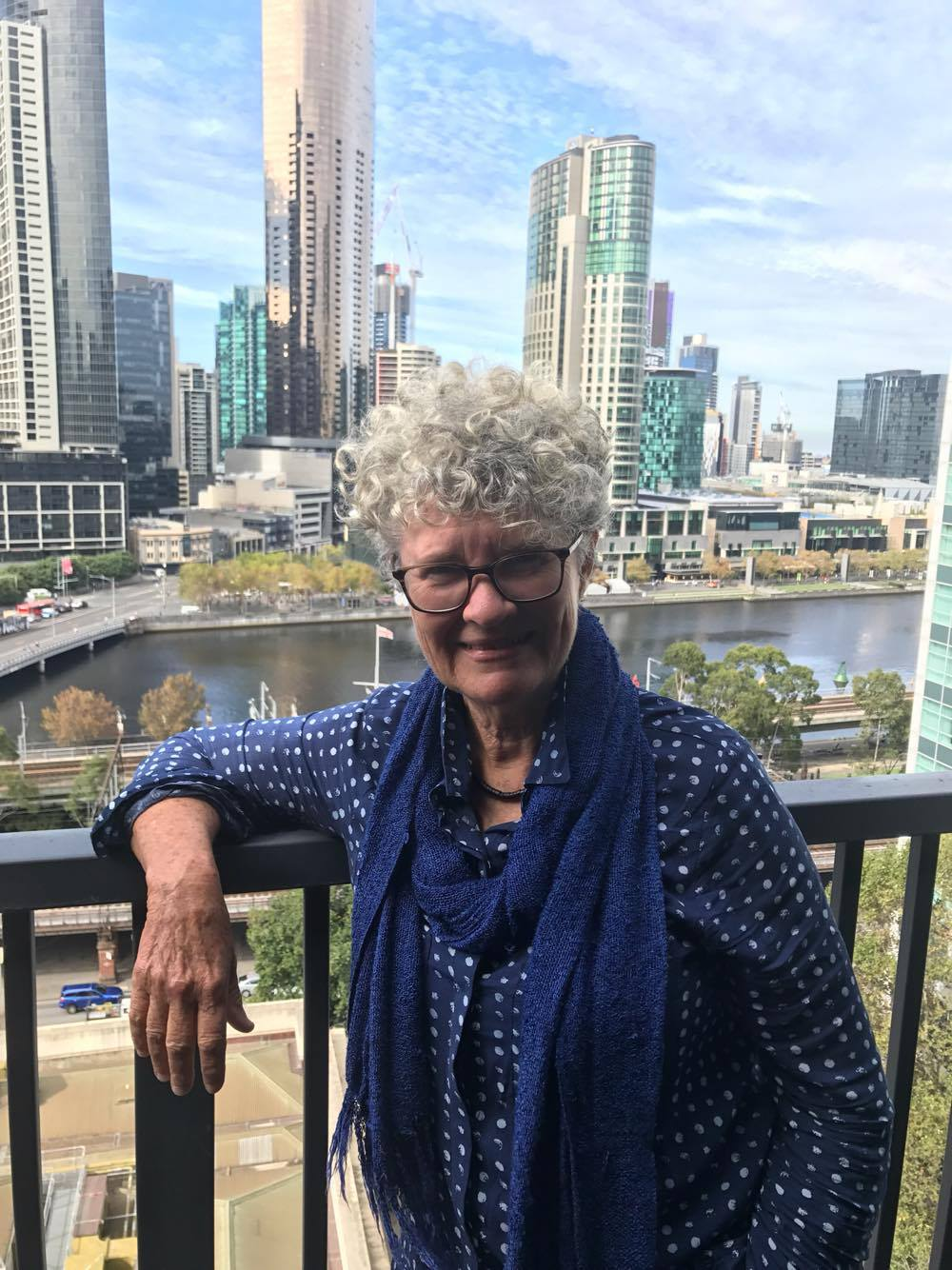
- Grenville in Melbourne, 2017
- Born: Catherine Elizabeth Grenville; 1950 (age 75–76); Sydney, New South Wales, Australia
- Occupations: Novelist, teacher of creative writing
- Spouses: Robert Steiner; Bruce Petty (m. 1988, separated)
- Children: 2
- Writing career
- Genres: General fiction, historical fiction, short stories
- Website: kategrenville.com.au

Catherine Elizabeth Grenville AO (born 1950) is an Australian author. She has published many books, including fiction, non-fiction, biography, and books about the writing process. In 2001, she won the Orange Prize for The Idea of Perfection, and in 2006 she won the Commonwealth Writers' Prize for The Secret River. The Secret River was also shortlisted for the Man Booker Prize.

Her novels have been published worldwide and have been translated into many languages. Three have been adapted into feature films. The Secret River was adapted for the stage by Andrew Bovell and toured by the Sydney Theatre Company in 2019.

== Life ==
Kate Grenville was born in 1950, one of three children of Kenneth Grenville Gee, a District Court judge and barrister; and Isobel Russell, a pharmacist. She was educated at Cremorne Girls High School, the University of Sydney (BA Hons) and the University of Colorado (MA). After completing her undergraduate degree at the University of Sydney, Grenville worked in the film industry, mostly editing documentaries at Film Australia. She has also been a teacher of creative writing. Between 1976 and 1980 she lived in London and Paris, and wrote fiction while supporting herself by doing film-editing, writing, and secretarial jobs. In 1980 she went to the University of Colorado at Boulder to do a master's degree in creative writing. She returned to Australia in 1983 and became a sub-editor at SBS Television in the subtitling department. She won a literary grant in 1986 and left SBS to pursue her writing. Since the early 1990s she has been an Honorary Associate at the University of Sydney.

In 2006 she was awarded a Doctorate of Creative Arts by the University of Technology, Sydney under the supervision of Glenda Adams and Paula Hamilton. She has also been awarded an Honorary Doctorate of Letters from the University of Sydney, the University of NSW, and Macquarie University. In 2017 she was awarded a Lifetime Achievement award from the Australia Council and in 2018 was appointed an Officer of the Order of Australia.

Grenville has been married to Robert Steiner and cartoonist Bruce Petty. She lives in Sydney with her son and daughter. Her leisure activities include learning to play the cello and performing in an amateur orchestra.

== Career ==
Kate Grenville's reputation as a short story writer was made by the publication in 1984 of her collection Bearded Ladies. On its publication, Peter Carey wrote "Here is someone who can really write."

Lilian's Story was her first published novel (1985) and won The Australian/Vogel Literary Award. It was loosely based on the story of Bea Miles, known in Sydney for her eccentric public behaviour. It has become one of Australia's best-loved novels and in 1996 was made into a film starring Ruth Cracknell and Toni Collette; Collette won the Australian Film Institute award for supporting actress for her performance as the young Lilian.

Dreamhouse followed in 1986, and appeared as the 1994 film Traps. Joan Makes History – the recipient of an Australian Bicentennial Commission – was published in 1988.

In 1994 Grenville returned to the characters and setting of Lilian's Story with a companion novel – Dark Places – that re-tells the events of the earlier novel from the point of view of Lilian's incestuous father. Dark Places won the Victorian Premier's Literary Award in 1995. (In the US this novel is titled Albion's Story.)

The Idea of Perfection appeared in 2000 and won the Orange Prize for Fiction, at the time Britain's richest literary award.

In 2006 The Secret River was published, the first of Grenville's books that take Australia's colonial past, and relations with Australia's indigenous people, as their subject. The Secret River was inspired by the story of Grenville's own great-great-great grandfather, a convict sent to Australia from London in 1806. This book won the Commonwealth Prize, the Christina Stead Prize, and the NSW Premier's Community Relations Prize, and was shortlisted for the Man Booker Prize.

Searching for the Secret River (2006) is a memoir about the research and writing of the novel, tracing the journey of the author's increasing awareness of how Australia's colonial past informs its present.

The Lieutenant (2008) is set thirty years earlier than The Secret River. Based on the historical notebooks of Lieutenant William Dawes, it tells the story of the friendship between a soldier with the First Fleet and a young Gadigal girl. These two novels together explore something of the complexity of black–white relations in Australia's past.

Sarah Thornhill (2011) is the sequel to The Secret River and takes up the story of William Thornhill's youngest daughter. It can be read as a stand-alone novel, without reference to The Secret River.

In 2015 Grenville published One Life: My Mother's Story, in which she uses the fragments of memoir that her mother left to construct the story of a woman whose life—in some ways typical of her times, in others remarkable—spanned a century of tumult and dramatic change.

Grenville has also written or co-written several books about the writing process which are widely used in creative writing workshops and in schools and universities: The Writing Book, Writing from Start to Finish, and Making Stories (co-written with Sue Woolfe).

In 2017 she published a book about the politics and health effects of artificial scents, The Case Against Fragrance.

Grenville's 2020 novel, A Room Made of Leaves, takes its inspiration from the life of the early Australian settler Elizabeth Macarthur.

Restless Dolly Maunder, a novel based on the life of Grenville's grandmother, was published in 2023 and shortlisted for the 2024 Women's Prize for Fiction.

Grenville has been awarded fellowships from the International Association of University Women and from the Literary Arts Board of the Australia Council. Her novels have all been published in the UK and US as well as Australia and have been translated into many languages, including German, Swedish, French, Hebrew and Chinese. Two have been made into feature films. The Secret River was made into a TV mini-series, and adapted (by Andrew Bovell) as a play that had sell-out runs at the Adelaide and Edinburgh Festivals.

== Style and subject matter ==
Lilian's Story, set in the early 20th century, takes as its subject a woman who rejects her middle-class background and the conventional future that is expected of her, and instead chooses to live as a street person, making a living by offering recitations from Shakespeare. At the end of her life she declares joyously: "Drive on, George. I am ready for whatever comes next."

Joan Makes History is a satirical re-writing of Australia's history, foregrounding the women rather than the men. Joan is an Everywoman character who in various guises lives through all the iconic moments of Australia's past. She "makes history" both by simply living her life, and by (re)making history by writing it.

Dreamhouse is a black comedy about a marriage on the rocks. It explores themes of both men and women freeing themselves from stereotypes to accept their true selves. Both partners in the marriage are attracted to their own sex: the wife is prepared to acknowledge that and act on it while the husband refuses to.

The Idea of Perfection is about people haunted by the impossible ideal of perfection. The two main characters are both middle-aged and frumpish, and consider themselves unlovably flawed. The journey they make is to recognise that to be "imperfect" is simply to be human, and carries its own power. As the epigraph from Leonardo da Vinci asserts: "An arch is two weaknesses that together make a strength".

The Secret River is set in early 19th-century Australia and is based on the story of one of Grenville's convict ancestors, Solomon Wiseman, a London boatman transported for theft. She takes that story as a means of exploring a wider theme: the dark legacy of colonialism, especially its impact on Australia's Aboriginal peoples. The title comes from the anthropologist W. E. H. Stanner, who wrote about a "secret river of blood flowing through Australia's history": the story of white Australia's relationship with the Aboriginal people.

Grenville has written a memoir of the research and writing of The Secret River, entitled Searching for the Secret River.

The Lieutenant is the story of one of the very earliest moments of black-white relationship in Australia, at the time of first settlement in 1788. Based on a historical source – the Gadigal-language notebooks of Lieutenant William Dawes – the novel tells the story of a unique friendship. In learning the Gadigal language from a young girl, Dawes wrote down word-for-word parts of their conversations. Grenville has used these fragments as the basis for a novel exploring how it might be possible for two people to reach across the gulfs of language and culture that separate them, and arrive at a relationship of mutual warmth and respect. She has described it as a "mirror-image" of The Secret River.

Sarah Thornhill is a sequel to The Secret River. It tells the story of one of the children of the main character in the earlier book. Sarah Thornhill grows up knowing nothing of the dark secret in her family's past, and when she has to confront it, the direction of her life and her thinking is changed. It is a story about secrets and lies, and how to deal with a dark legacy from the past. Grenville has said that the book is set in the 19th century, but is as much about the ugly secrets in Australian history that her own generation inherited.

These three books form a loose trilogy – "The Colonial Trilogy" – about the first three generations of white settlement in Australia, and what that shared black/white history means for contemporary Australians. The themes of the three books reach beyond Australia: all are widely read in other countries where colonialism has left a problematic legacy.

A Room Made of Leaves returns to this subject and can be seen as a fourth novel in this series. It takes as its starting-point the life of Elizabeth Macarthur, wife of early wool baron John Macarthur. It tells the story of that remarkable woman, but its underlying theme is about the way false stories can come to replace the truth.

Grenville frequently does extensive research for her novels, often using historical or other sources as the starting-point for the work of the imagination. She says of her books that they are "sometimes inspired by historical events, but they are imaginative constructs, not an attempt to write history".

Some years after her mother died, Grenville put together a book about her, based on the memoirs and recordings her mother left. The result is One Life: My Mother's Story, a book about a woman born in 1912 who rode the waves of tumultuous change that happened over the course of her life.

Grenville's most recent non-fiction book is about the health problems that can be caused by the synthetic fragrances that are all around us: The Case Against Fragrance. In this book she recounts the difficulties she has personally experienced due to fragrances in the environment and discusses the latest research findings by Dr Anne Steinemann and others.

== Awards and nominations ==
- Fellow of the Australian Academy of the Humanities (FAHA) in 2008
- Honorary Doctorate of Letters from the University of New South Wales in 2010
- Honorary Doctorate of Letters from the University of Sydney in 2012
- Honorary Doctorate of Letters from Macquarie University in 2013
- The Dixson Medal awarded by the Library Council of New South Wales in 2014
- Award for Lifetime Achievement in Literature from the Australia Council in 2017
- Officer of the Order of Australia in 2018

=== Prizes ===
- 1984 – The Australian/Vogel Literary Award for Lilian's Story
- 1995 – Victorian Premier's Vance Palmer Prize for Fiction for Dark Places
- 2001 – Orange Prize for Fiction for The Idea of Perfection
- 2006 – Commonwealth Writers' Prize for The Secret River
- 2006 – New South Wales Premier's Literary Awards, Christina Stead Prize for fiction for The Secret River
- 2006 – New South Wales Premier's Literary Awards, Community Relations Commission Award for The Secret River
- 2021 – New South Wales Premier's Literary Awards, Christina Stead Prize for fiction for A Room Made of Leaves

=== Shortlisted ===
- 1995 – Dark Places – Miles Franklin Award
- 2006 – The Secret River – Miles Franklin Award and the Man Booker Prize
- 2021 – A Room Made of Leaves – Walter Scott Prize
- 2021 – Australian Book Industry Awards, Literary fiction book of the year for A Room Made of Leaves
- 2024 – Restless Dolly Maunder – Women's Prize for Fiction
- 2024 – Restless Dolly Maunder – Prime Minister's Literary Award for Fiction

== Bibliography ==
=== Novels ===
- Lilian's Story (1985)
- Dreamhouse (1986), ISBN 0-7022-1959-2
- Joan Makes History: A Novel (1988), ISBN 0-7022-2174-0
- Dark Places (1994), ISBN 0-330-33549-9 (alternative title: Albion's Story)
- The Idea of Perfection (1999)
- The Secret River. Melbourne: Text Publishing. 2005.
- The Lieutenant (2008)
- Sarah Thornhill, sequel to The Secret River, (2011)
- A Room Made of Leaves (2020)
- Restless Dolly Maunder (2023)
- Unsettled. Black Inc. 2025. ISBN 978-1760645649.
- The Country Schoolmaster – A Mystery in 88 Letters. Black Inc. 2026. ISBN 978-1760646257.

=== Short fiction ===
- Bearded Ladies: Stories (1984, collection) ISBN 0-7022-1716-6
- "Mate". Granta. 70: 293–304. Summer 2000.

=== Non-fiction ===
- The Writing Book: A Manual for Fiction Writers (1990), ISBN 0-04-442124-9
- Making Stories: How Ten Australian Novels Were Written (1993), with Sue Woolfe ISBN 1-86373-316-7
- Writing from Start to Finish: a Six-Step Guide (2001)
- Searching for the Secret River (2006), ISBN 1-921145-39-0
- One Life: My Mother's Story (2015), ISBN 978-1-922182-05-0
- The Case Against Fragrance (2017), ISBN 978-1-925355-95-6
