= A Room Made of Leaves =

2020 novel by Australian author Kate Grenville

- Author: Kate Grenville
- Language: English
- Genre: Literary novel
- Publisher: Text Publishing
- Publication date: 2 July 2020
- Publication place: Australia
- Media type: Print
- Pages: 352 pp.
- Awards: 2021 New South Wales Premier's Literary Awards — Christina Stead Prize for Fiction, winner
- ISBN: 9781922330024

A Room Made of Leaves is a 2020 novel by the Australian author Kate Grenville, originally published by Text Publishing.

It was the winner of the 2021 New South Wales Premier's Literary Awards, Christina Stead Prize for Fiction.

== Synopsis ==
This novel tells the story of Elizabeth Macarthur, wife of John Macarthur, a wealthy and corrupt early pioneer of Australia's wool industry. Grenville uses the trope of imagining she has found a long lost memoir of Elizabeth's, upon which she bases her book.

== Critical reception ==
Writing in The Guardian Kirsten Tranter called the novel a "stunning literary achievement", and went on to note: "Most striking is the way Grenville makes images startlingly fresh that ought to be worn out with use. She turns inside-out the conventional emblem of birdsong as heartfelt expression, making it expressive only of tragic limitation: as a newly married, unhappy wife, Elizabeth hears a bird that sings 'a lovely song' at dawn."

In Australian Book Review Don Anderson notes that Grenville hints at a possible adulterous relationship between Elizabeth Macarthur and botanist William Dawes, and wonders if it is "ethical for a novelist to do what Grenville does and impute such details into the private lives of historical personages?"

== Publication history ==
- 2020 Text Publishing, Australia and 2023
- 2020 Canongate, UK and 2021

The novel was also translated into Italian and German in 2021.

== Awards ==
- 2021 New South Wales Premier's Literary Awards – Christina Stead Prize for Fiction, winner
- 2021 The Age Book of the Year – Fiction, shortlisted
- 2021 Walter Scott Prize, shortlisted

== Notes ==
- Dedication: Dedicated to all those whose stories have been silenced.
- Epigraph: Do not believe too quickly! - Elizabeth Macarthur

== See also ==
- 2020 in Australian literature
