= TDK =

Japanese multinational electronics corporation

TDK Corporation
- Native name: TDK株式会社
- Romanized name: TDK Kabushiki-gaisha
- Formerly: TDK Electronics Co., Ltd (1935-1983)
- Type: Public (K.K)
- Traded as: TYO: 6762
- Industry: Electronics
- Founded: 7 December 1935; 90 years ago as Tokyo Denki Kagaku Kōgyō K.K.
- Founder: Kenzo Saito
- Headquarters: Nihonbashi, Chūō, Tokyo, Japan
- Area served: Worldwide
- Key people: Noboru Saito (CEO)
- Products: Currently: Electronic components, Power supplies, Sensors; Previously: Cassettes, CDs, DVDs, Blu-ray Discs
- Revenue: ▲US$13.56 billion (2021)
- Operating income: ▲US$1.15 Billion (2021)
- Net income: ▼US$528.7 million (2021)
- Total assets: ▲US$21.4 billion (2021)
- Total equity: ▲JP¥831.2 billion ▲US$7.84 billion (2018)
- Number of employees: 102,883
- Website: www.tdk.com

TDK Corporation (Japanese: TDK株式会社, Hepburn: TDK Kabushiki-gaisha) is a Japanese multinational electronics corporation that manufactures electronic components and recording and data-storage media. Its motto is "Contribute to culture and industry through creativity".

"TDK" is an initialism of the original Japanese name of the company: Tokyo Denki Kagaku Kōgyō K.K. (Tokyo Electric Chemical Industry Co., Ltd.). The company is listed on the Tokyo Stock Exchange and is a constituent of the Nikkei 225 and TOPIX indices.

== History ==
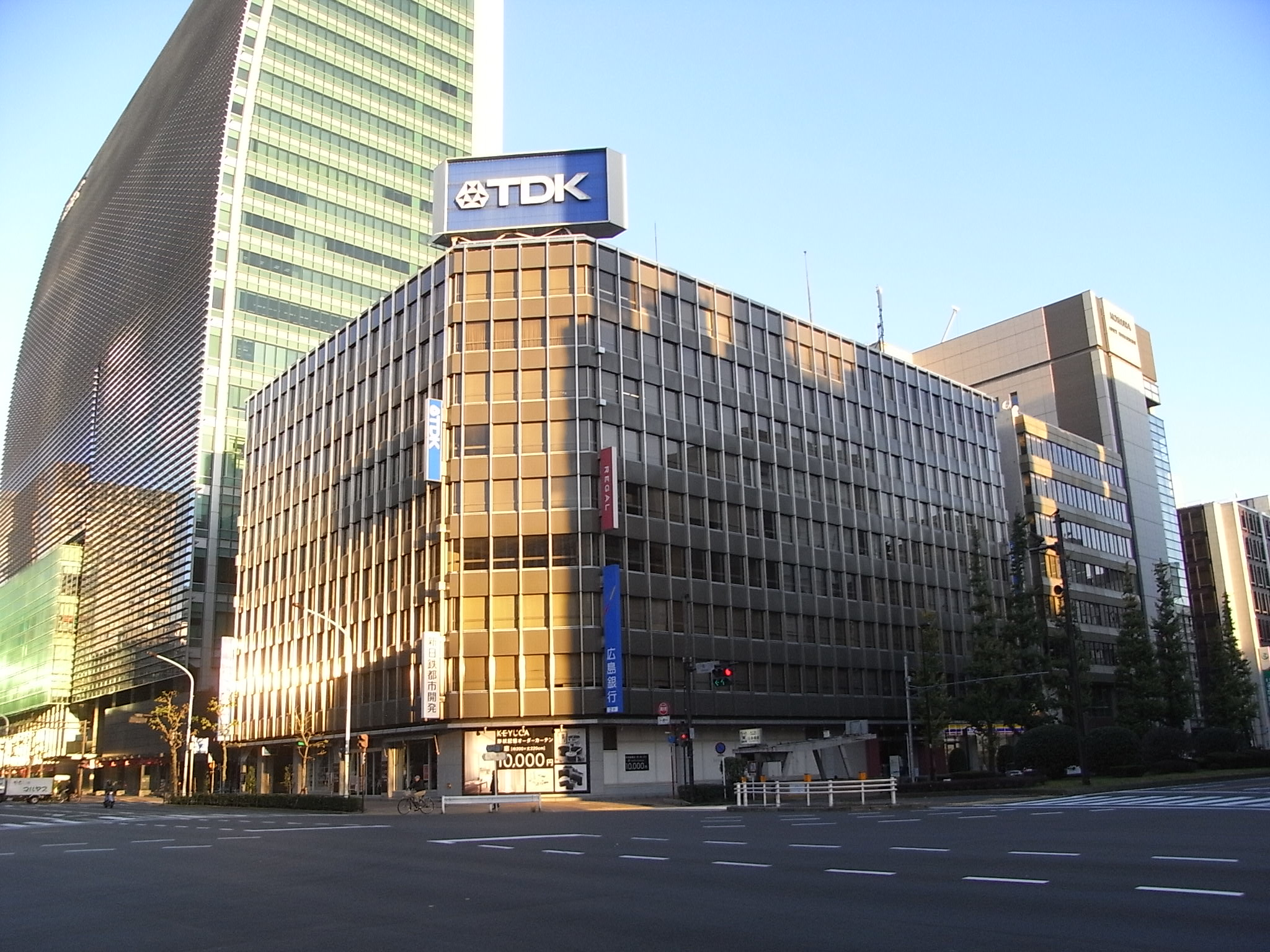
Former headquarters in Tokyo

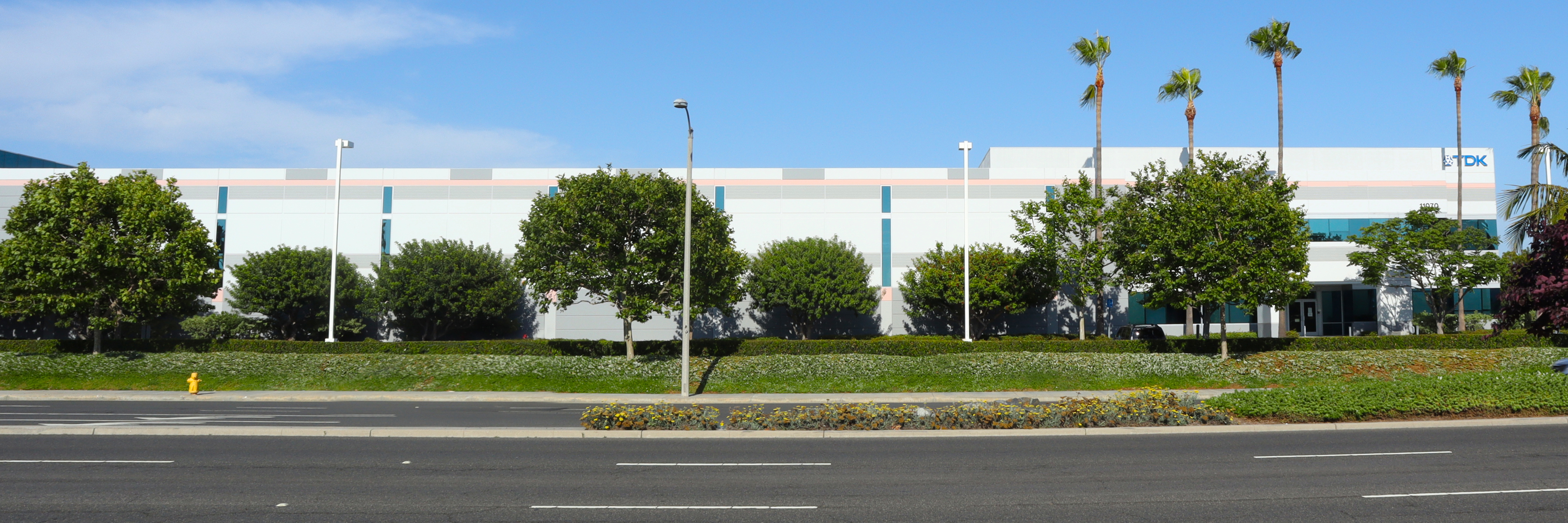
TDK Corporation of America headquarters in Cypress, California

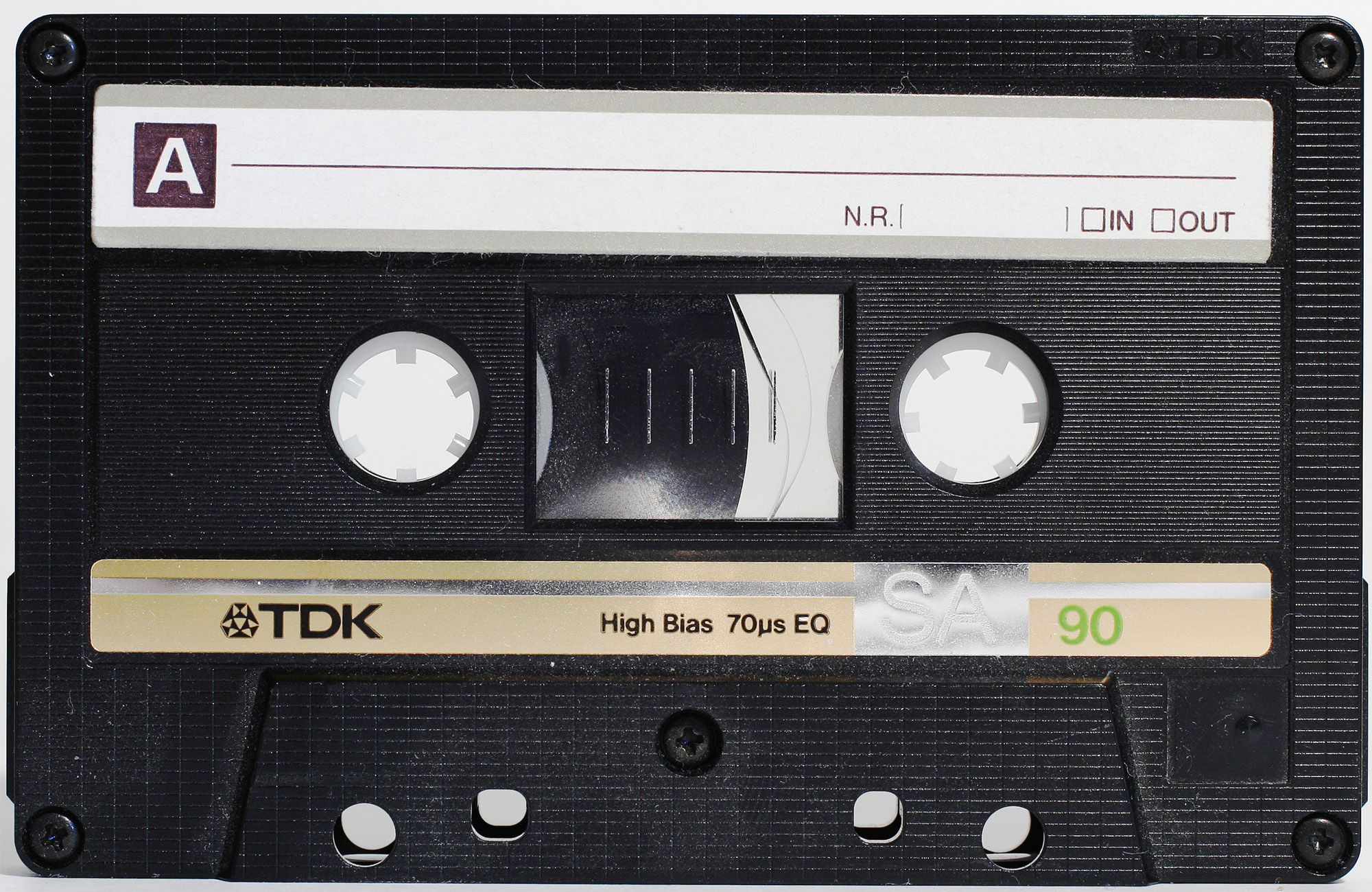
A TDK SA-90 compact cassette

TDK was founded by Kenzo Saito in Tokyo, Japan, on 7 December 1935 to manufacture the iron-based magnetic material ferrite, which had been recently invented by Yogoro Kato and Takeshi Takei. In 1952 and 1957, they began to produce magnetic tape, with compact cassette tapes following in 1966. TDK manufactured an extensive portfolio of magnetic and optical media, including several formats of videotape and blank CD-R and recordable DVD discs until the recording media business was sold to Imation in 2007.

TDK produced five million ferrite cores through 1945 that were primarily used to reduce the volume and weight of radio receivers used by the Imperial Japanese military.

Operations in the United States began in 1965 with a New York City office, and European operations began in 1970 with an office in Frankfurt, West Germany.

In 1980, TDK developed a multilayering technology to create chip capacitors and inductors used in personal computers, laptops, smartphones and other electronic devices.

In 1986, TDK acquired SAE Magnetics and introduced high-density recording heads.

In the 1990s, TDK's Mass Storage Division included brushless DC spindle motors, magnetoresistance (MR) heads and thin-film heads.

Since 1997, TDK has gradually withdrawn from the production of compact cassettes. First with the MA-X and AR ("Acoustic Response"), then the AD ("Acoustic Dynamic") and SA-X line in 2001 and 2002 respectively, then the MA ("Metal Alloy") line in 2004. The SA ("Super Avilyn") and D ("Dynamic") lines were withdrawn in 2011. Industry trends see the company moving into new forms of media. In 2004, TDK was the first media manufacturer to join the companies developing BD post-DVD technology. TDK operated a semiconductor division in California for about a decade, but divested it in 2005.

The company dabbled in the video game business in the late 1990s and early 2000s, by operating TDK Mediactive in the U.S. and Europe, and TDK Core in Japan.

In late 2007, Imation acquired TDK's recording media business, including flash media, optical media, magnetic tape, and accessories, for $300 million. This also included a license to use the "TDK Life on Record" brand on data storage and audio products for 25 years. In September 2015, Imation announced that it had agreed to relinquish this license and would cease selling TDK-branded products by the end of the year.

Since the 2000s, TDK has focused on the development, manufacture and sales of electronic components, HDD heads and suspension, and power supplies.

Beginning in 2005, TDK has acquired many types of electronic device manufacturers including passive component developers, sensors manufacturers and power supply companies. These areas remain TDK's focus today.

Since acquiring numerous companies and sharpening its product line focus in recent years, TDK has begun building a portfolio of varying sensors, actuators and power electronic components through these brands. These include multi-axis MEMS motion tracking devices and MEMS microphones from InvenSense, a point-of-load DC-DC converter from Faraday Semi, and MEMS-based ultrasonic Time-of-Flight sensors from Chirp Microsystems intended for consumer electronics, AR/VR, robotics, drones, IoT, automotive and industrial market segments. Other areas of TDK's recent focus include power components for mobile devices, high-stability MEMS accelerometers from Tronics, miniaturized haptic actuators, and custom ASICs (Application Specific ICs) through its subsidiary ICsense.

In 2017, TDK and GenCell began collaborating to develop and produce an ammonia-based fuel solution.

On 29 September 2026, TDK signed a memorandum of understanding with Taiyo Yuden to explore joint development of multilayer ceramic capacitors and inductors, together with cooperation in manufacturing and procurement. The agreement initiated discussions on the scope and responsibilities of a proposed business alliance, including the possibility of a future capital alliance.

== Key acquisitions and joint ventures ==
- 1986: SAE Magnetics (H.K.) Ltd., a magnetic head maker based in Hong Kong
- 2000: Headway Technologies, a magnetic head maker based in the United States
- 2005: Amperex Technology Limited, a Lithium Polymer battery company based in Hong Kong
- 2005: Lambda Power Division, a group of power supply businesses of London-based Invensys PLC.
- 2008: Epcos, an electronic device manufacturer based in Germany
- 2016: Hutchinson Technology Inc., a manufacturer of HDD suspension assemblies based in the United States
- 2016: Micronas Semiconductor Holding AG
- 2017: RF360 Holdings Singapore PTE Ltd. – a joint venture with Qualcomm Inc. (USA)
- 2017: ICsense NV, a mixed-signal ASIC design & supply company based in Belgium
- 2017: InvenSense, Inc., a sensor specialist based in the United States
- 2018: Chirp Microsystems, a developer of low power, ultrasonic 3D-sensing solutions based in the United States
- 2018: Faraday Semi LLC, a developer of miniature Point of Load (PoL) solutions based in the United States
- 2023: Qeexo, co. a developer of embedded AI / TinyML technologies based in the United States

== Sponsorship and advertising ==
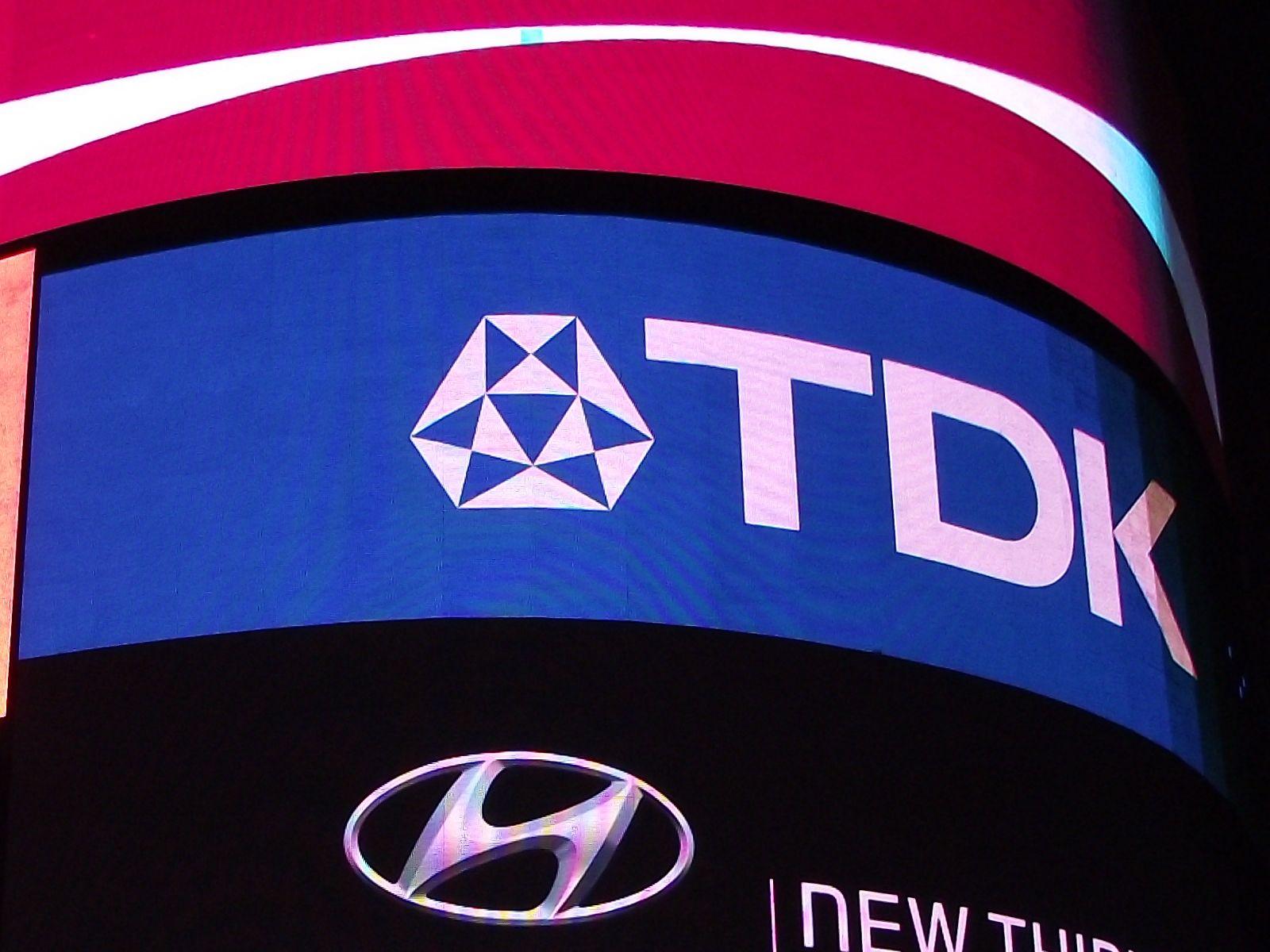
The former TDK sign at Piccadilly Circus in London

TDK has sponsored the IAAF World Championships in Athletics since the 1983 inaugural event in Helsinki.

TDK sponsored Ajax for several years in the 1980s during which it won UEFA Cup Winners' Cup in 1987. From 1993 to 1999, TDK were also the sponsors of the English football club Crystal Palace, who were promoted to the Premier League twice during this era, though lasting for just one season before being relegated on both occasions. TDK was also a minor sponsor of the Brisbane Broncos Rugby League Team during the early 1990s. It also sponsors activities and events such as those at The Cross nightclub in Central London, and it had a prominent sign at Piccadilly Circus from 1990. The contract for this sign was terminated in 2015, as TDK was moving away from consumer electronics.

TDK has owned a sign on One Times Square since 2000. The screen is placed under that of Toshiba and can be seen during the annual Times Square New Year's Ball Drop.

Since 2001, TDK has supported performances of some of the world's distinguished orchestras in Japan within the company's "TDK Orchestra Concerts" program. TDK's "Outreach-Mini Concerts" and "Special Rehearsals and Main Concert Invitations" additionally serve as avenues for the company to attract younger audiences.

In October 2024, McLaren announced TDK as the official technology partner for the McLaren Formula E Team and the McLaren Shadow F1 Sim Racing Team.

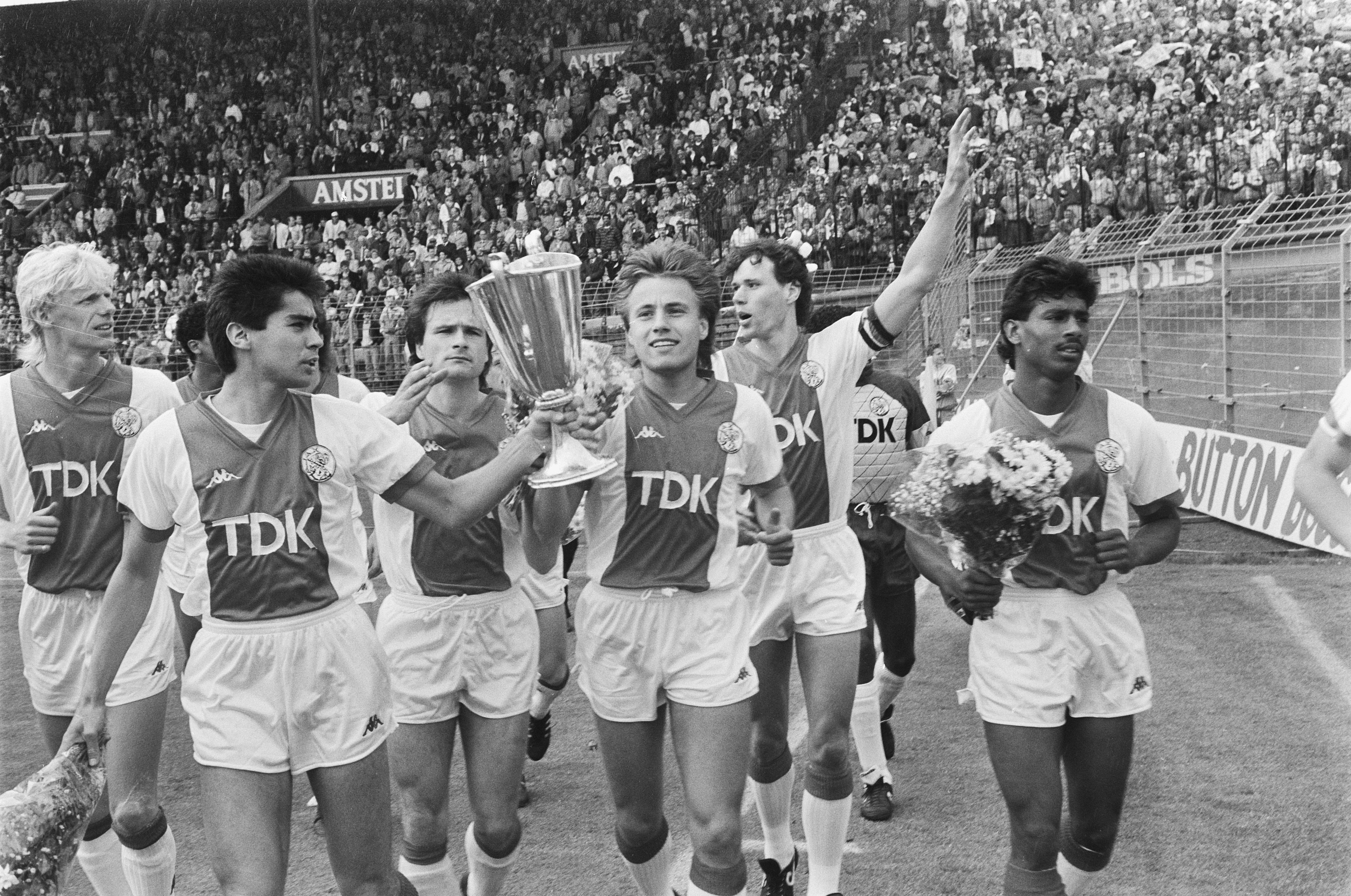
Ajax players in 1987

== Museum ==
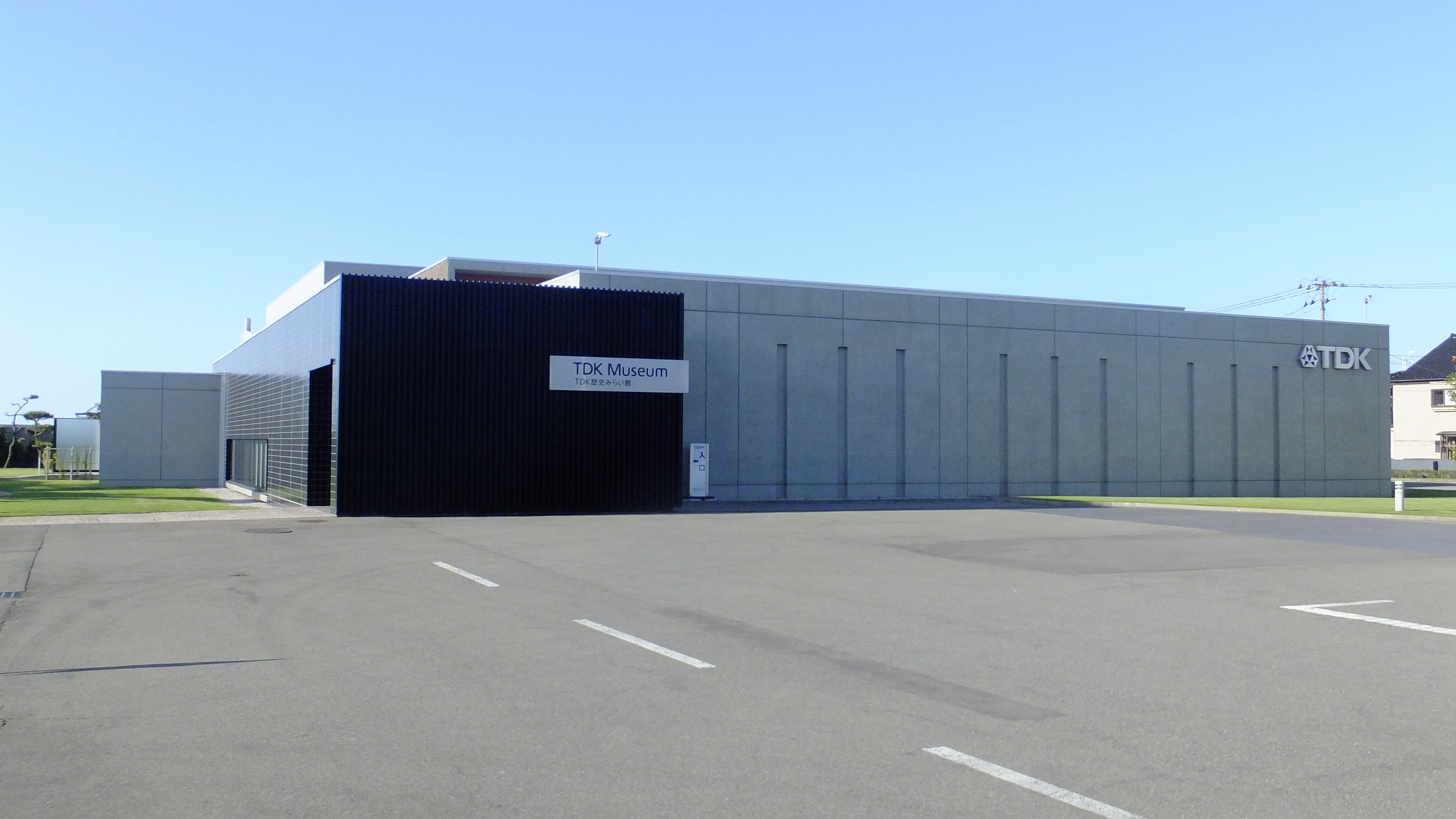
TDK Museum

TDK operates a company museum in Nikaho, Akita, Japan. The museum is open to the public, free of charge. Among its exhibits are a comprehensive history of the company, its products and technologies, and emerging developments.

== TDK products ==
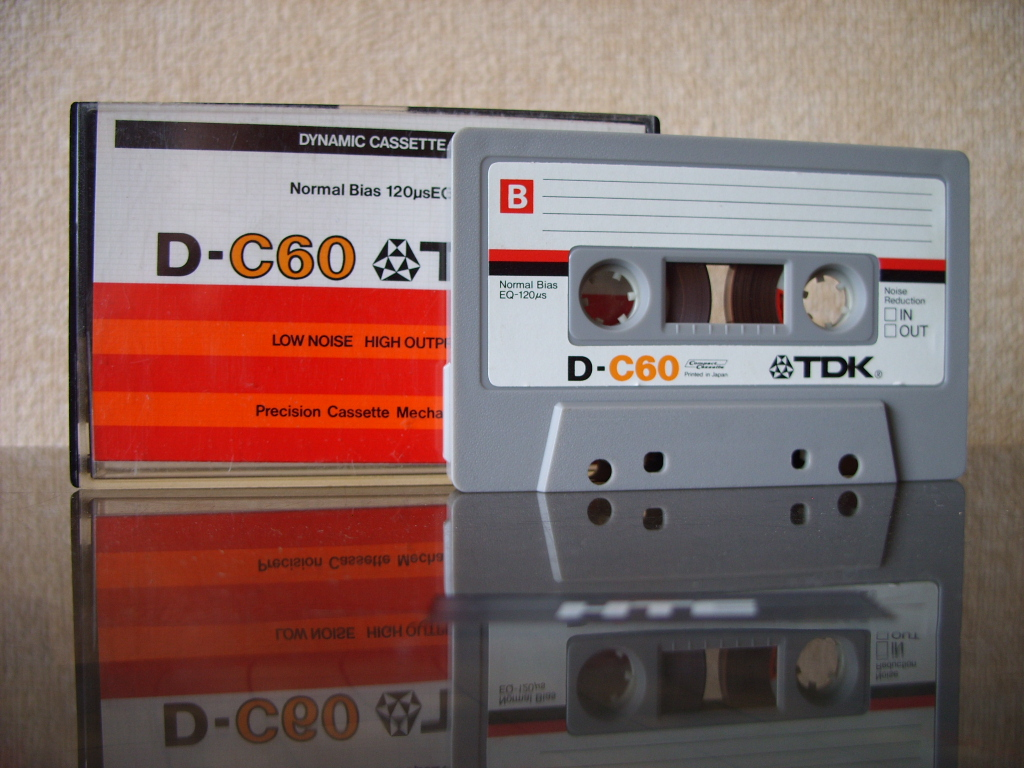
D60 audio cassette from 1979

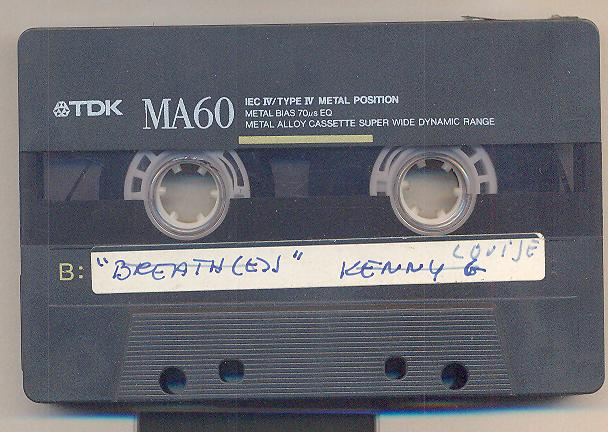
MA60 - 1990-92

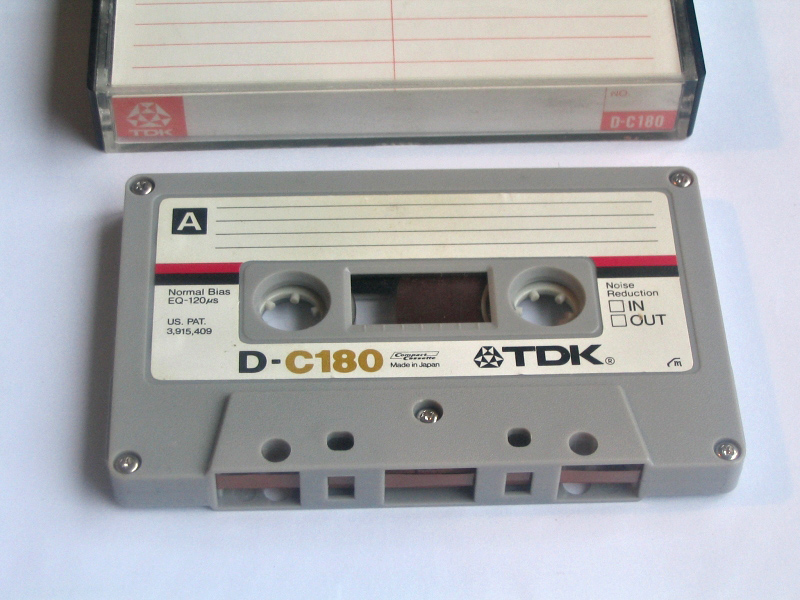
D-C180 - three hour audio cassette

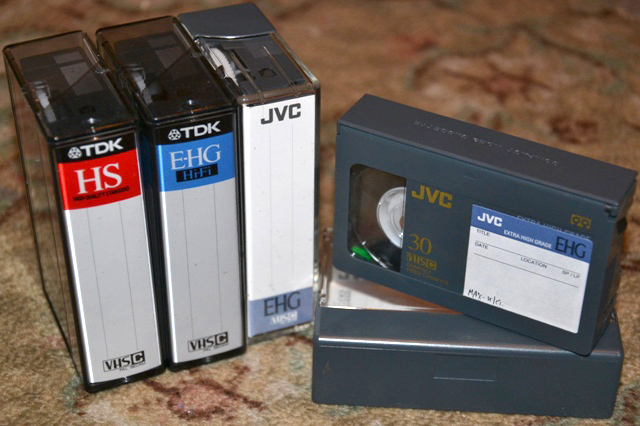
VHS-C video cassettes

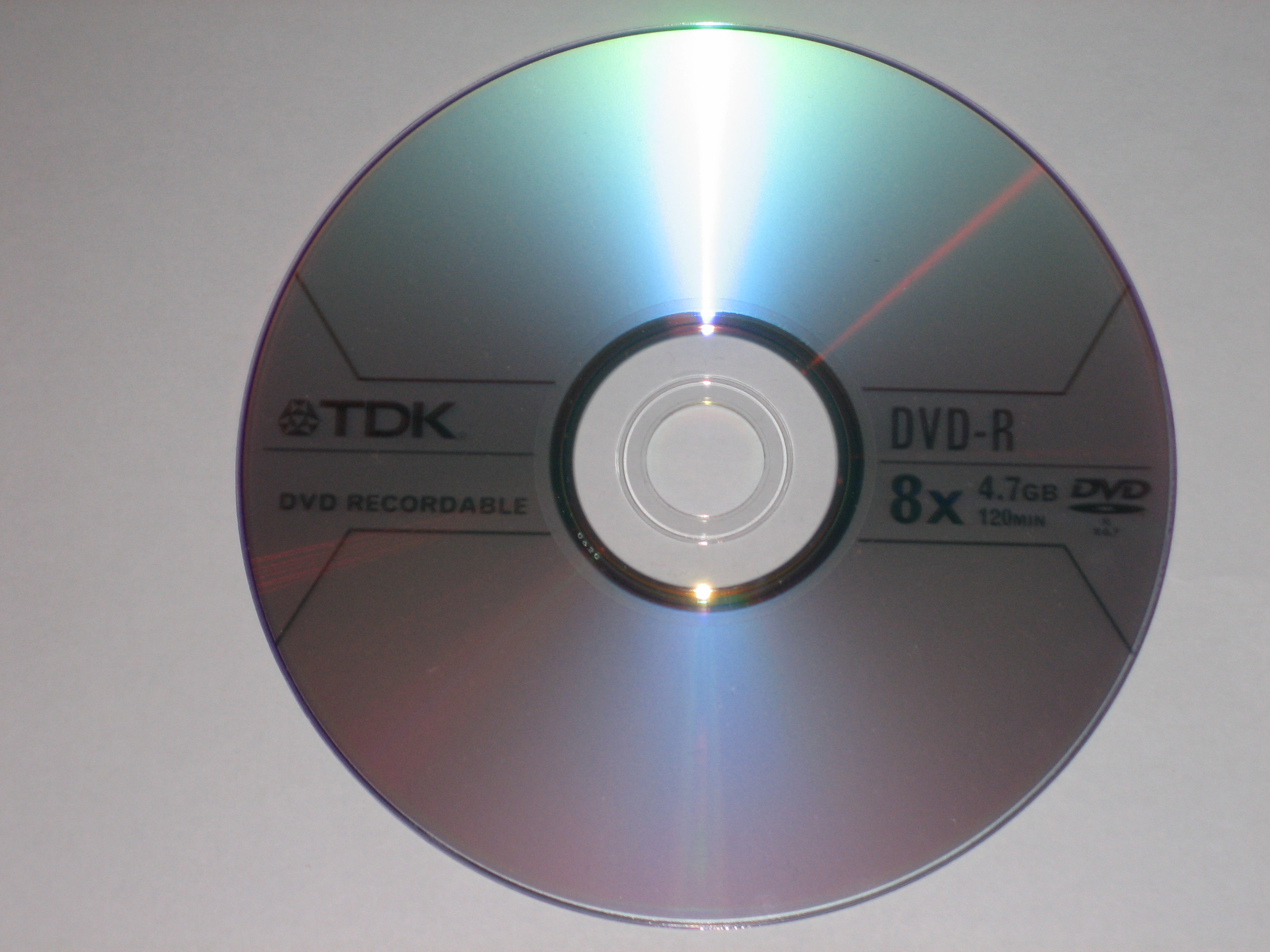
Blank DVD

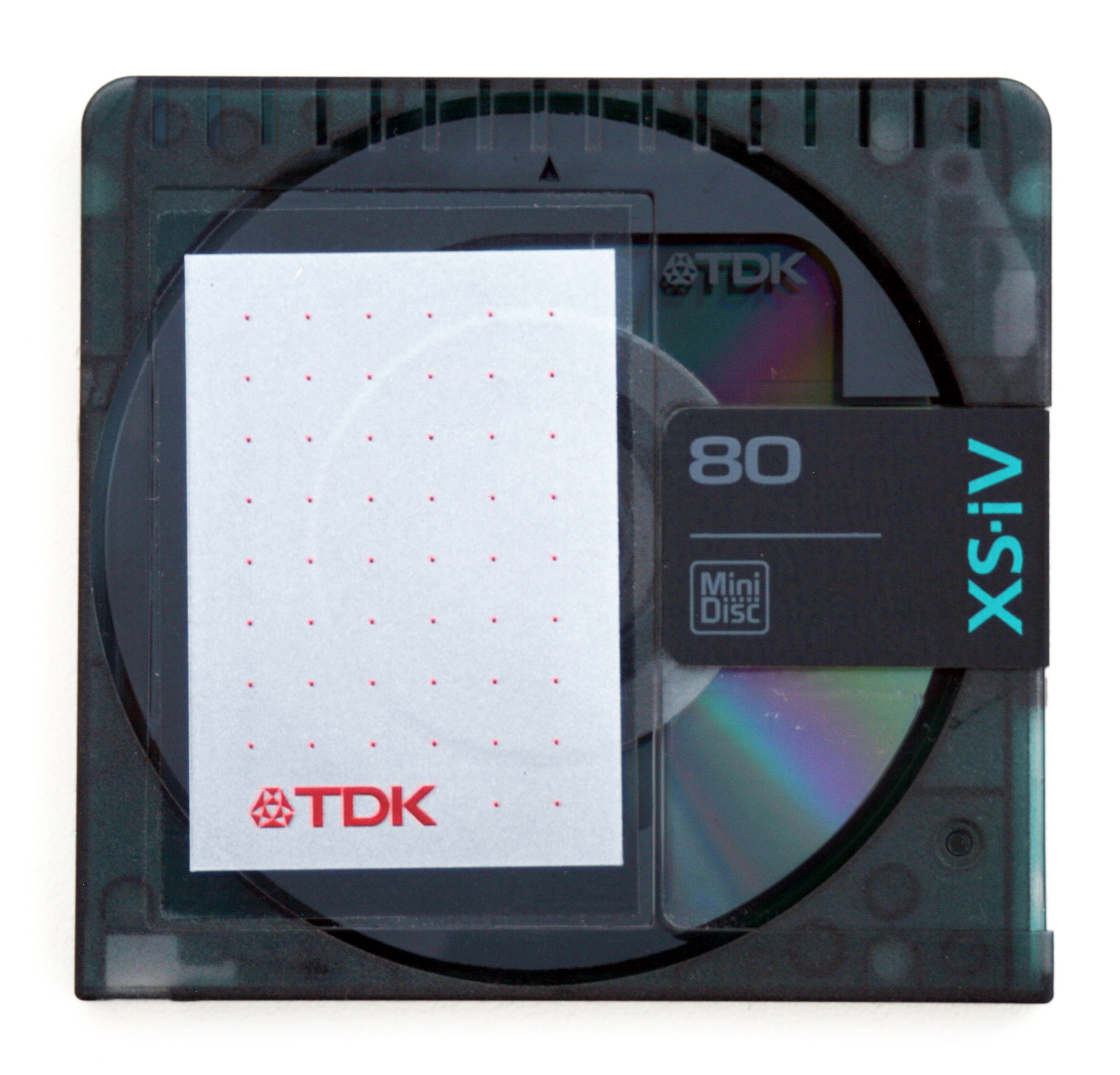
MiniDisc

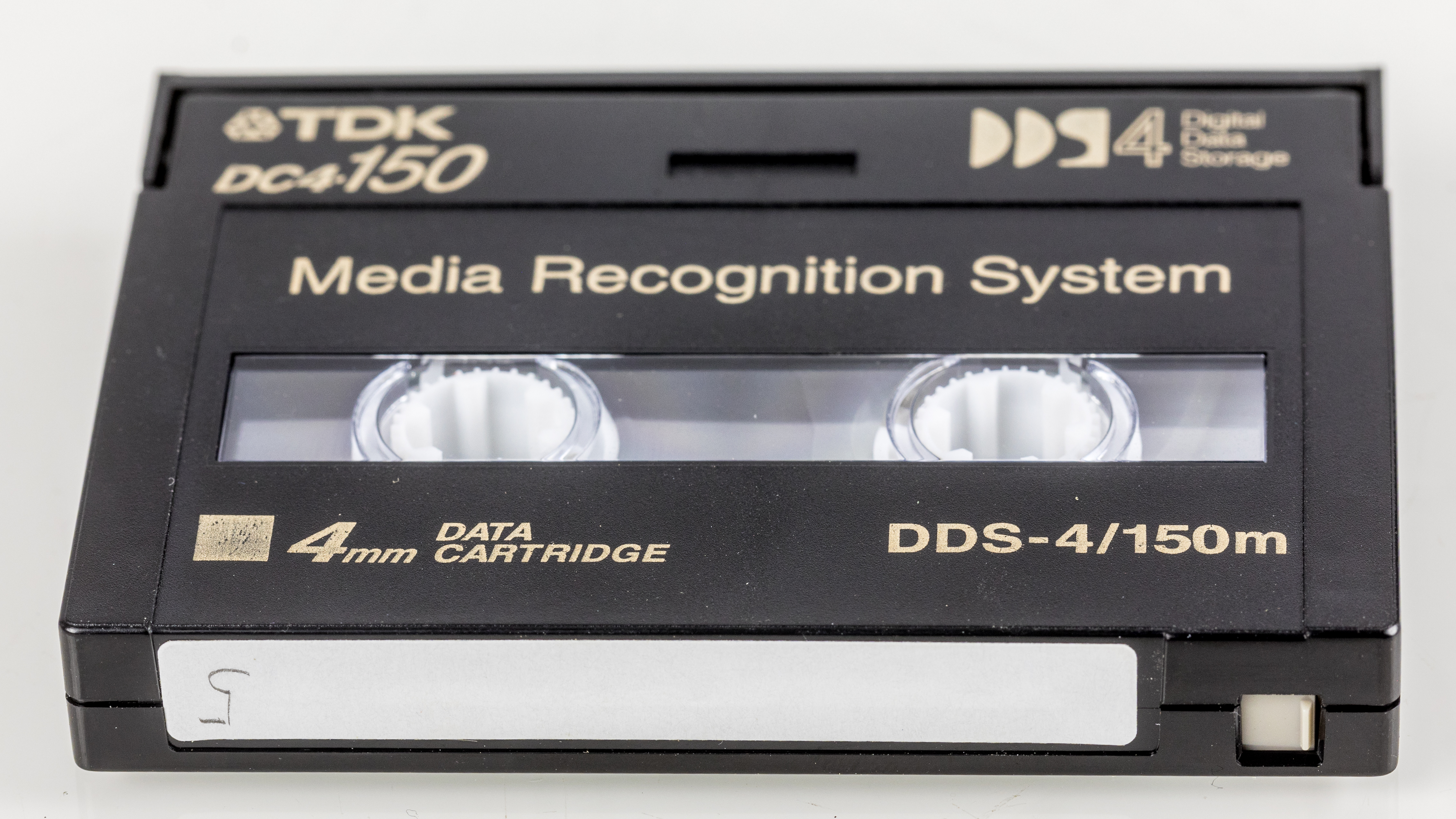
DDS-3 data cartridge

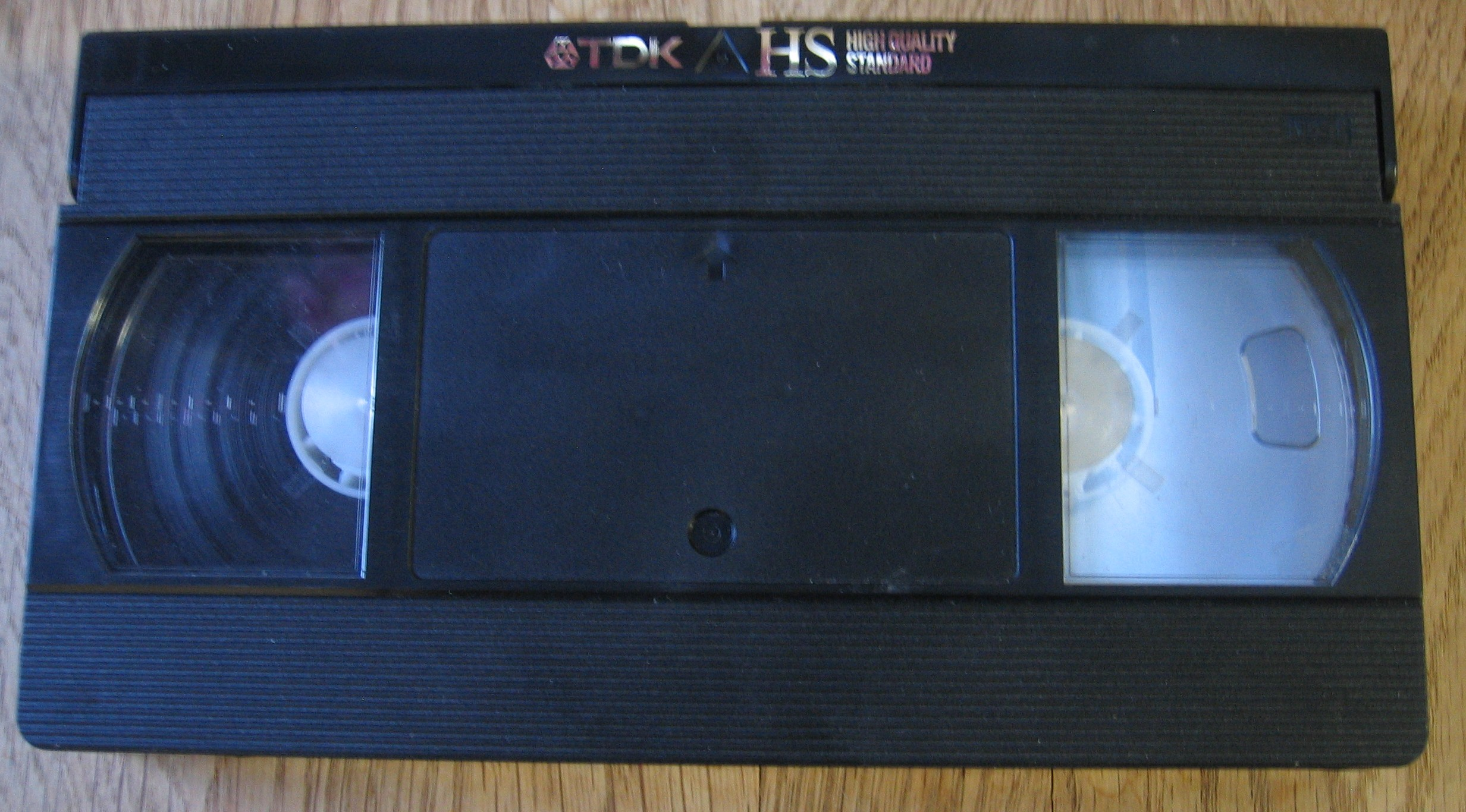
TDK HS VHS cassette
