= The Secret River =

2005 novel by Kate Grenville

- First edition
- Author: Kate Grenville
- Language: English
- Genre: Historical fiction
- Publisher: Text Publishing, Australia
- Publication date: 2005
- Publication place: Australia
- Media type: hardback
- Pages: 334
- ISBN: 1-920885-75-7
- OCLC: 70061296
- Dewey Decimal: 823/.914 22
- LC Class: PR9619.3.G73 S53 2005
- Preceded by: The Idea of Perfection
- Followed by: Searching for The Secret River

The Secret River is a 2005 historical novel by Kate Grenville about an early 19th-century Englishman transported to Australia for theft. The story explores what might have happened when Europeans colonised land already inhabited by Aboriginal people. The book was shortlisted for the Booker Prize in 2006, and has been compared to Thomas Keneally's The Chant of Jimmie Blacksmith and to Peter Carey's True History of the Kelly Gang for its style and historical theme.

== Background ==
The Secret River was inspired by Grenville's desire to understand the history of her ancestor Solomon Wiseman, who settled on the Hawkesbury River at the area now known as Wisemans Ferry. Her inspiration to understand this came from her taking part in the 28 May 2000 Reconciliation Walk across Sydney Harbour Bridge during which she realised that she did not know much about the early interactions between the settlers and the Aboriginal people. Initially intended to be a work of non-fiction about Wiseman, the book eventually became a fictional work based on her research into Wiseman but not specifically about Wiseman himself. The novel took five years and twenty drafts to complete.

The novel is dedicated to the Aboriginal people of Australia. It sparked hostility from some historians, including Australian academic Mark McKenna, who published an article in which he criticised Kate Grenville, claiming that Grenville had referred to The Secret River as a "work of history", however, he could not provide a source for the statement. It received a positive response from many Aboriginal people; Grenville has said "they recognise that the book is my act of acknowledgement, my way of saying: this is how I'm sorry".

=== Adaptations ===
The Secret River has been adapted for the stage by Andrew Bovell; the play was presented by the Sydney Theatre Company in January 2013 and included in the Edinburgh International Festival in August 2019.

A TV adaptation was made in 2015 by Ruby Entertainment with support from the Australian Broadcasting Corporation and Screen Australia, and was aired in June of that year by ABC TV as a two-part miniseries.

== Plot summary ==
The early life of William Thornhill is one of Dickensian poverty, depredation and criminality. After a childhood of poverty and petty crime in the slums of London, William Thornhill is sentenced to death for stealing wood, however, in 1806 his sentence is commuted to transportation to New South Wales for the term of his natural life. With his wife Sal and children in tow, he arrives in a harsh land that feels at first like a death sentence. However, there is a way for the convicts to buy freedom and start afresh. Thornhill then gets sent to Sydney on a boat, by himself. After 9 months, Thornhill is finally able to reunite with his family in Australia. Sal becomes Thornhill's master, and Thornhill obtains a ticket of leave one year later, after he demonstrates good behaviour. His son Willie, already five years old, is unable to recognise his father after being away from him for so long. Thornhill now also has another son, Richard, whom he calls Dick.

During his first night in this new land, Thornhill encounters an Aboriginal man and struggles to communicate with him. The following weeks, Thornhill goes to work as a lighterman for Mr. King. Thornhill brings alcohol, which he got from Mr. King, back home to set up his own bar, named the "Pickled Herring." An Aboriginal man called Scabby Bill is a regular customer, entertaining the customers by dancing for money.

Three years later, Thornhill quits his job and works for Thomas Blackwood, a former convict who is attempting to reconcile himself with the place and its people. Blackwood lives on the Hawkesbury River, with his boat, "the Queen". Thornhill also meets Smasher Sullivan, a man whose fear of this alien world turns into brutal depravity towards it.

Thornhill soon realises that the Aboriginal people of Australia have a different concept of land ownership than the white settlers, and notices that many of the Aboriginals were stealing his corn. Thornhill realises that Blackwood has an Aboriginal wife and son. Shocked, he goes on to tell his wife about it. In order to tell them apart more easily, he gives the Aboriginal people nicknames like "Whisker Harry", "Long Bob" and "Black Dick". Thornhill is shocked to see his son Dick playing with the Aboriginal people, and beats him. As Thornhill and his family stake their claim on a patch of ground by the river, the battle lines between old and new inhabitants are drawn.

Soon after, Saggity, a friend of Smasher Sullivan is killed after a raid on his farm by Aboriginal people, leading to the battle with the Aboriginal people. Blackwood tries to stop the fighting, but gets whipped by Smasher. In the battle between the settlers and the Aboriginal people many casualties are sustained on both sides. Whisker Harry kills Sullivan, while he gets shot in the stomach, and long Jack gets shot in the head. Thornhill participates in the massacre.

A decade later, William Thornhill becomes the wealthiest man in the area. He builds his own house, but he always feels that something is off. He has also bought a new boat, named "Sarah", and renamed "Darkey's Creek" to "Thornhill's Point." Long Jack continued to stay at Thornhill's Point, when all the other Indigenous people had fled. Thornhill's son, Dick, leaves the family home to live with Blackwood, and Thornhill's friendship with Blackwood deteriorates, which leads Thornhill to have a sense of guilt of his actions.

== Searching for the Secret River ==
Grenville followed up The Secret River with a non-fiction book titled Searching for the Secret River in which she describes both the research she undertook into the history behind the book and her writing process. She chronicles how she changed from her original plan of writing a non-fiction book about her great-great-great-grandfather, Solomon Wiseman, to writing a fictional work.

== Use in curricula ==
The Secret River is a text used for the Victorian Certificate of Education Year 12 English course. It is also used for the Western Australian ATAR course through Secondary school. The University of Sydney distributed 9,500 copies of The Secret River to enrolling first-year students in January 2011 as part of the inaugural 'First-Year Book Club', which aims to bring students together to discuss and debate big ideas around a common theme. As a "set text" it is included in the IGCSE (Grade 9 & 10) English Literature course for 2017–19. As a text used for Close Text analysis, The Secret River is included in the Tasmanian Certificate of Education (TCE) English Level 3 course.

== Awards and nominations ==
- FAW Christina Stead Award, 2005: joint winner
- Commonwealth Writers Prize, South East Asia and South Pacific Region, Best Book, 2006: winner
- Commonwealth Writers Prize, 2006: winner
- Miles Franklin Literary Award, 2006: shortlisted
- New South Wales Premier's Literary Awards, Community Relations Commission Award, 2006: winner
- New South Wales Premier's Literary Awards, Christina Stead Prize for Fiction, 2006: winner
- Nita Kibble Literary Award, 2006: shortlisted
- Booksellers Choice Award, 2006: winner
- Australian Book Industry Awards (ABIA), Australian Book of the Year, 2006: winner
- Australian Book Industry Awards (ABIA), Australian Literary Fiction Book of the Year, 2006: winner
- The Age Book of the Year Award, Fiction Prize, 2006: shortlisted
- Booker Prize, 2006: shortlisted
- Queensland Premier's Literary Awards, Best Fiction Book, 2006: shortlisted
- Victorian Premier's Literary Award, The Vance Palmer Prize for Fiction, 2006: shortlisted
- Colin Roderick Award, 2005: shortlisted
- International Dublin Literary Award, 2007: longlisted
