= 2015 in Australian literature =

This is a list of the historical events and publications of 2015 in Australian literature.

== Major publications ==
=== Literary fiction ===
- Tony Birch – Ghost River
- Lisa Birman — How to Walk Away
- Geraldine Brooks – The Secret Chord
- Robyn Cadwallader — The Anchoress
- Stephen Daisley – Coming Rain
- Gregory Day – Archipelago of Souls
- Peggy Frew – Hope Farm
- Lisa Gorton – The Life of Houses
- Sally Hepworth — The Secrets of Midwives
- David Ireland — The World Repair Video Game
- Susan Johnson – The Landing
- Gail Jones – A Guide to Berlin
- Myfanwy Jones – Leap
- Mireille Juchau – The World Without Us
- Malcolm Knox – The Wonder Lover
- Amanda Lohrey – A Short History of Richard Kline
- Judy Nunn — Spirits of the Ghan
- A. S. Patrić – Black Rock White City
- Gregory David Roberts — The Mountain Shadow
- Steve Toltz – Quicksand
- Lucy Treloar – Salt Creek
- Charlotte Wood – The Natural Way of Things

=== Children's and Young Adult fiction ===
- Nick Earls – New Boy
- John Flanagan — The Tournament at Gorlan
- Mem Fox – This & That
- Mem Fox – Nellie Belle
- Andy Griffiths – The 65-Storey Treehouse
- John Larkin — The Pause
- Maureen McCarthy – Stay With Me
- Sophie Masson – Hunter's Moon
- Gillian Mears – The Cat with the Coloured Tail
- Louis Nowra – Prince of Afghanistan
- Emily Rodda – Two Moons
- R. A. Spratt — Friday Barnes, Under Suspicion
- Lili Wilkinson – Green Valentine
- Fiona Wood – Cloudwish

=== Crime and mystery ===
- Peter Corris – Gun Control
- Garry Disher – The Heat
- Mark Dapin – R&R
- Candice Fox – Fall
- Katherine Howell – Tell the Truth
- Adrian McKinty – Gun Street Girl
- Barry Maitland – Ash Island
- Michael Robotham – Close Your Eyes
- Emma Viskic – Resurrection Bay
- Dave Warner – Before It Breaks

=== Science Fiction and Fantasy ===
- K. A. Bedford – Black Light
- John Birmingham
  - Emergence
  - Resistance
- Merlinda Bobis – Locust Girl: A Lovesong
- James Bradley – Clade
- Trudi Canavan — Angel of Storms
- Isobelle Carmody – The Red Queen
- Kate Forsyth — The Beast of Blackmoor Bog
- Amie Kaufman & Jay Kristoff — Illuminae
- Jane Rawson – Formaldehyde

=== Romance ===
- Alison Goodman — The Dark Days Club

=== Poetry ===
- Robert Adamson – Net Needle
- David Brooks – Open House
- Brook Emery, with Sarah Holland-Batt eds. — Australian Poetry Anthology, Volume 4.
- Clive James – Sentenced to Life
- Les Murray – Waiting for the Past

=== Drama ===
- Daniel Keene – The Long Way Home
- Matthew Whittet – Seventeen

=== Biographies ===
- David Day – Paul Keating : The Biography
- Peter Garrett – Big Blue Sky : A Memoir
- Kate Grenville – One Life : My Mother's Story
- Gerald Murnane – Something for the Pain : A Memoir of the Turf
- Brenda Niall – Mannix
- Magda Szubanski – Reckoning : A Memoir
- Tim Winton – Island Home : A Landscape Memoir

=== Non-fiction ===
- Joel Deane – Catch and Kill: The Politics of Power
- Andrew Fowler – The War on Journalism: Media Moguls, Whistleblowers and the Price of Freedom
- Gideon Haigh – Certain Admissions
- Lucy Sussex – Blockbuster! : Fergus Hume and the Mystery of the Hansom Cab

== Awards and honours ==
Note: these awards were presented in the year in question.

=== Lifetime achievement ===
| Award | Author |
|---|---|
| Christopher Brennan Award | Gig Ryan |
| Melbourne Prize for Literature | Chris Wallace-Crabbe |
| Patrick White Award | Joan London |

=== Literary ===
| Award | Author | Title | Publisher |
|---|---|---|---|
| ALS Gold Medal | Jennifer Maiden | Drones and Phantoms | Giramondo Publishing |
| Colin Roderick Award | Not awarded | | |
| Indie Book Awards Book of the Year | Don Watson | The Bush: Travels in the Heart of Australia | Penguin |
| Nita Kibble Literary Award | Joan London | The Golden Age | Vintage Books |
| Stella Prize | Emily Bitto | The Strays | Affirm Press |
| Victorian Prize for Literature | Alan Atkinson | The Europeans in Australia: Volume Three: Nation | NewSouth |

=== Fiction ===
==== National ====
| Award | Author | Title | Publisher |
|---|---|---|---|
| Adelaide Festival Awards for Literature | Not awarded | | |
| The Australian/Vogel Literary Award | Murray Middleton | When There’s Nowhere Else to Run | Allen & Unwin |
| Barbara Jefferis Award | Not awarded | | |
| Indie Book Awards Book of the Year – Fiction | Sonya Hartnett | Golden Boys | Penguin |
| Indie Book Awards Book of the Year – Debut Fiction | Maxine Beneba Clarke | Foreign Soil | Hachette |
| Miles Franklin Award | Sofie Laguna | The Eye of the Sheep | Allen & Unwin |
| Prime Minister's Literary Awards | Joan London | The Golden Age | Random House |
| New South Wales Premier's Literary Awards | Mark Henshaw | The Snow Kimono | Text Publishing |
| Queensland Literary Awards | Joan London | The Golden Age | Random House |
| Victorian Premier's Literary Award | Rohan Wilson | To Name Those Lost | Allen & Unwin |
| Western Australian Premier's Book Awards | Not awarded | | |
| Voss Literary Prize | Elizabeth Harrower | In Certain Circles | Text Publishing |

=== Children and Young Adult ===
==== National ====
| Award | Category | Author | Title | Publisher |
|---|---|---|---|---|
| Children's Book of the Year Award | Older Readers | Claire Zorn | The Protected | University of Queensland Press |
| Children's Book of the Year Award | Younger Readers | Libby Gleeson | The Cleo Stories : The Necklace and the Present | Allen & Unwin |
| Children's Book of the Year Award | Picture Book | Freya Blackwood, text Irema Kobald | My Two Blankets | Little Hare, Hardie Grant Egmont |
| Children's Book of the Year Award | Early Childhood | Libby Gleeson, illus. Freya Blackwood | Go to Sleep, Jessie! | Little Hare, Hardie Grant Egmont |
| Indie Book Awards Book of the Year | Children's & YA | Judith Rossell | Withering-by-Sea | Penguin |
| New South Wales Premier's Literary Awards | Children's | Catherine Norton | Crossing | Omnibus/Scholastic Australia |
| New South Wales Premier's Literary Awards | Children's | Tamsin Janu | Figgy in the World | Omnibus/Scholastic Australia |
| New South Wales Premier's Literary Awards | Young People's | Jaclyn Moriarty | The Cracks in the Kingdom | Pan Macmillan Australia |
| Victorian Premier's Literary Award | Young Adult Fiction | Claire Zorn | The Protected | University of Queensland Press |

=== Crime and Mystery ===
==== International ====
| Award | Author | Title | Publisher |
|---|---|---|---|
| CWA Gold Dagger Award | Michael Robotham | Life or Death | Hachette |

==== National ====
| Award | Category | Author | Title | Publisher |
|---|---|---|---|---|
| Davitt Award | Novel | Liane Moriarty | Big Little Lies | Penguin Books |
| Davitt Award | Young adult novel | Ellie Marney | Every Word | Allen & Unwin |
| Davitt Award | Children's novel | Judith Rossell | Withering-By-Sea | HarperCollins |
| Davitt Award | True crime | Caroline Overington | Last Woman Hanged | HarperCollins |
| Davitt Award | Debut novel | Christine Bongers | Intruder | Random House |
| Davitt Award | Readers' choice | Sandi Wallace | Tell Me Why | Clan Destine Press |
| Ned Kelly Award | Novel | Candice Fox | Eden | Random House |
| Ned Kelly Award | First novel | Jock Serong | Quota | Text Publishing |
| Ned Kelly Award | True crime | Helen Garner | This House of Grief: The Story of a Murder Trial | Text Publishing |
| Ned Kelly Award | Lifetime achievement | Not awarded | | |

=== Science fiction ===
| Award | Category | Author | Title | Publisher |
|---|---|---|---|---|
| Aurealis Award | Sf Novel | Amie Kaufman and Jay Kristoff | Illuminae | Allen & Unwin |
| Aurealis Award | Sf Short Story | Sean Williams | "All the Wrong Places" | Meeting Infinity (Solaris Books) |
| Aurealis Award | Fantasy Novel | Trent Jamieson | Day Boy | Text Publishing |
| Aurealis Award | Fantasy Short Story | Rowena Cory Daniels | "The Giant's Lady" | Legends 2 (Newcon Press) |
| Aurealis Award | Horror Novel | Trent Jamieson | Day Boy | Text Publishing |
| Aurealis Award | Horror Short Story | Joanne Anderton | "Bullets" | In Sunshine Bright and Darkness Deep (AHWA) |
| Aurealis Award | Young Adult Novel | Kathryn Barker | In the Skin of a Monster | Allen & Unwin |
| Aurealis Award | Young Adult Short Story | Deborah Kalin | "The Miseducation of Mara Lys" | Cherry Crow Children (Twelfth Planet Press) |
| Ditmar Award | Novel | Glenda Larke | The Lascar's Dagger | Hachette |
| Ditmar Award | Best Novella or Novelette | Sean Williams | "The Legend Trap" | Kaleidoscope (Twelfth Planet Press) |
| Ditmar Award | Best Short Story | Cat Sparks | "The Seventh Relic" | Phantazein (FableCroft Publishing) |

=== Poetry ===
| Award | Author | Title | Publisher |
|---|---|---|---|
| Adelaide Festival Awards for Literature | Not awarded | | |
| Anne Elder Award | Cathy Altmann | Circumnavigation | Poetica Christi Press |
| Mary Gilmore Award | Not awarded | | |
| Prime Minister's Literary Awards | Geoffrey Lehmann | Poems 1957–2013 | UWA Publishing |
| New South Wales Premier's Literary Awards | David Malouf | Earth Hour | University of Queensland Press |
| Queensland Literary Awards | Les Murray | Waiting for the Past | Black Inc |
| Victorian Premier's Literary Award | Jill Jones | The Beautiful Anxiety | Puncher and Wattmann |
| Western Australian Premier's Book Awards | Not awarded | | |

=== Drama ===
| Award | Category | Author | Title | Publisher |
|---|---|---|---|---|
| New South Wales Premier's Literary Awards | Script | Jennifer Kent | The Babadook | Causeway Films |
| Patrick White Playwrights' Award | Award | Neil Levi | Kin | Sydney Theatre Company |
| Patrick White Playwrights' Award | Fellowship | Tommy Murphy | | |

=== Non-Fiction ===
| Award | Category | Author | Title | Publisher |
|---|---|---|---|---|
| Adelaide Festival Awards for Literature | Non-Fiction | Not awarded | | |
| Indie Book Awards Book of the Year | Non-Fiction | Don Watson | The Bush: Travels in the Heart of Australia | Penguin |
| National Biography Award | Biography | Philip Butterss | An Unsentimental Bloke: The Life and Work of C J Dennis | Wakefield Press |
| New South Wales Premier's Literary Awards | Non-Fiction | Don Watson | The Bush : Travels in the Heart of Australia | Penguin |
| New South Wales Premier's History Awards | Australian History | Alan Atkinson | The Europeans in Australia: Volume Three: Nation | Oxford University Press |
| New South Wales Premier's History Awards | Community and Regional History | Babette Smith | The Luck of the Irish : How a Shipload of Convicts Survived the Wreck of the Hive to Make a New Life in Australia | Allen & Unwin |
| New South Wales Premier's History Awards | General History | Warwick Anderson & Ian R Mackay | Intolerant Bodies : A Short History of Autoimmunity | Johns Hopkins University Press |
| Queensland Literary Awards | Non-Fiction | Don Watson | The Bush : Travels in the Heart of Australia | Penguin |
| Victorian Premier's Literary Award | Non-fiction | Alan Atkinson | The Europeans in Australia: Volume Three: Nation | Oxford University Press |

== Deaths ==
- 28 January — Lionel Gilbert, historian, author, and academic, (born 1924)
- 29 January — Colleen McCullough, novelist (born 1937)
- 13 February — Faith Bandler, author and civil rights activist (born 1918)
- 23 February — James Aldridge, novelist (born 1918)
- 20 March — Malcolm Fraser, politician and author (born 1930)
- 23 March — Alan Seymour, playwright (born 1927)
- 20 May — J. S. Harry, poet (born 1939)
- 29 May — Syd Harrex, poet and academic (born 1935)
- 20 August — Veronica Brady, poet and critic (born 1929)
- 4 October — Nan Hunt, children's writer who also wrote as N. L. Ray (born 1918)

== See also ==
- 2015 in Australia
- 2015 in literature
- 2015 in poetry
- List of years in Australian literature
- List of years in literature
- List of Australian literary awards
