= 2002 in Australian literature =

This article presents a list of the historical events and publications of Australian literature during 2002.

== Major publications ==
=== Literary fiction ===
- John Clarke – The Tournament
- J. M. Coetzee – Youth: Scenes from Provincial Life II
- Bryce Courtenay – Matthew Flinders' Cat
- Andrea Goldsmith – The Prosperous Thief
- Sonya Hartnett – Of a Boy
- Sarah Hay – Skins
- Chloe Hooper – A Child's Book of True Crime
- Kate Jennings – Moral Hazard
- Gail Jones – Black Mirror
- Thomas Keneally – An Angel in Australia
- Colleen McCullough – The October Horse
- Alex Miller – Journey to the Stone Country
- Dorothy Porter – Wild Surmise
- Eva Sallis – The City of Sealions

=== Children's and Young Adult fiction ===
- J. C. Burke – White Lies
- Isobelle Carmody – Darksong
- Alison Croggon – The Gift
- Mem Fox – The Magic Hat
- Marieke Hardy – Short Cuts
- Richard Harland – Ferren and the White Doctor
- Lian Hearn – Across the Nightingale Floor
- Maureen McCarthy – When You Wake and Find Me Gone
- Meme McDonald and Boori Pryor – Njunjul the Sun
- David Metzenthen – Wildlight: A Journey
- Kirsty Murray – Walking Home with Marie-Claire
- Natalie Jane Prior – Fireworks and Darkness
- Gillian Rubinstein – The Whale's Child
- Markus Zusak – The Messenger

=== Crime ===
- Carmel Bird – Open for Inspection
- Kirsty Brooks – Lady Luck
- Jon Cleary – The Easy Sin
- Jane Clifton – Half Past Dead
- Peter Corris – Salt and Blood
- Kerry Greenwood – Murder in Montparnasse
- Gabrielle Lord – Baby Did a Bad Bad Thing
- Barry Maitland – Babel
- Shane Maloney – Something Fishy
- Tara Moss – Split
- Alex Palmer – Blood Redemption
- Peter Temple – In The Evil Day

=== Romance ===
- Lilian Darcy – For the Taking
- Barbara Hannay
  - A Bride at Birralee
  - Their Doorstep Baby
- Di Morrissey – Kimberley Sun
- Valerie Parv
  - The Baron and the Bodyguard
  - The Marquis and the Mother-To-Be

=== Science Fiction and Fantasy ===
- Damien Broderick – Transcension
- Trudi Canavan – The Novice
- Marianne Curley – The Named
- Cecilia Dart-Thornton
  - The Battle of Evernight
  - The Lady of the Sorrows
- Sara Douglass
  - The Crippled Angel
  - Hades' Daughter
- Greg Egan
  - Schild's Ladder
  - "Singleton"
- Ian Irvine – Tetrarch
- Fiona McIntosh
  - Destiny
  - Revenge
- Sean McMullen – Voyage of the Shadowmoon
- Juliet Marillier – Wolfskin
- Sean Williams
  - Echoes of Earth with Shane Dix
  - The Sky Warden and the Sun
  - The Storm Weaver and the Sand

=== Drama ===
- David Brown – Eating Ice Cream With Your Eyes Closed
- Nick Enright
  - Country Music
  - A Man with Five Children
- Michael Gow – The Fortunes of Richard Mahony
- Michael Gurr – The Simple Truth
- Daniel Keene – Half and Half
- Jenny Kemp – Still Angela
- Joanna Murray-Smith – Rapture
- David Williamson – Soulmates

=== Poetry ===
- M. T. C. Cronin – My Lover's Back : 79 Love Poems
- Robert Gray – Afterimages
- Jill Jones – Screens Jets Heaven: New and Selected Poems
- Emma Lew – Anything the Landlord Touches
- Kate Lilley – Versary
- Les Murray
  - Collected Poems : 1961–2002
  - Poems the Size of Photographs

=== Non-fiction ===
- Bruce Bennett – Australian Short Fiction: A History
- Anna Funder – Stasiland
- Mark McKenna – Looking for Blackfellas' Point : An Australian History of Place
- Ashley Mallett – The Black Lords of Summer : The Story of the 1868 Aboriginal Tour of England and Beyond
- John Marsden – The Boy You Brought Home : A Single Mother's Guide to Raising Boys

=== Biographies ===
- Nick Bleszynski – Shoot Straight, You Bastards! : The Truth Behind the Killing of 'Breaker' Morant
- Barry Dickins – Black and Whiteley : Barry Dickins in Search of Brett
- Ann Galbally – Charles Conder : The Last Bohemian
- Barry Hill – Broken Song : T. G. H. Strehlow and Aboriginal Possession
- Thomas Keneally – American Scoundrel : The Life of the Notorious Civil War General Dan Sickles
- Ross McMullin – Pompey Elliott
- Brenda Niall – The Boyds : A Family Biography
- Don Watson – Recollections of a Bleeding Heart : A Portrait of Paul Keating PM

== Awards and honours ==
Note: these awards were presented in the year in question.

=== Lifetime achievement ===
Award	Author
Christopher Brennan Award	Dimitris Tsaloumas
Patrick White Award	Tom Hungerford

=== Literary ===
Award	Author	Title	Publisher
The Age Book of the Year Award	Don Watson	Recollections of a Bleeding Heart : A Portrait of Paul Keating PM	Random House
ALS Gold Medal	Richard Flanagan	Gould's Book of Fish	Picador
Colin Roderick Award	Don Watson	Recollections of a Bleeding Heart : A Portrait of Paul Keating PM	Random House
Nita Kibble Literary Award	Marion Halligan	The Fog Garden	Allen & Unwin

=== Fiction ===
==== International ====
Award	Category	Author	Title	Publisher
Commonwealth Writers' Prize	Best Novel, SE Asia and South Pacific region	Richard Flanagan	Gould's Book of Fish	Picador
Commonwealth Writers' Prize	Best First Novel, SE Asia and South Pacific region	Meaghan Delahunt	In the Blue House	Bloomsbury
Commonwealth Writers' Prize	Overall winner	Richard Flanagan	Gould's Book of Fish	Picador

==== National ====
Award	Author	Title	Publisher
Adelaide Festival Awards for Literature	Peter Carey	True History of the Kelly Gang	University of Queensland Press
The Age Book of the Year Award	Joan London	Gilgamesh	Grove Press
The Australian/Vogel Literary Award	Danielle Wood	The Alphabet of Light and Dark	Allen & Unwin
Miles Franklin Award	Tim Winton	Dirt Music	Picador
New South Wales Premier's Literary Awards	Tim Winton	Dirt Music	Picador
Queensland Premier's Literary Awards	Venero Armanno	The Volcano	Knopf
Victorian Premier's Literary Award	Richard Flanagan	Gould's Book of Fish: A Novel in Twelve Fish	Picador
Western Australian Premier's Book Awards	Gail Jones	Black Mirror	Picador

=== Children and Young Adult ===
==== National ====
Award	Category	Author	Title	Publisher
Children's Book of the Year Award	Older Readers	Sonya Hartnett	Forest	Viking Books
Children's Book of the Year Award	Younger Readers	John Heffernan, illus. Andrew McLean	My Dog	Margaret Hamilton Books
Children's Book of the Year Award	Picture Book	Libby Gleeson, illus. Armin Greder	An Ordinary Day	Scholastic Press
Children's Book of the Year Award	Early Childhood	Bob Graham	Let's Get a Pup!	Walker Books
New South Wales Premier's Literary Awards	Children's	Shaun Tan	The Red Tree	Lothian Books
New South Wales Premier's Literary Awards	Young People's	Anthony Hill	Soldier Boy: The True Story of Jim Martin, the Youngest Anzac	Penguin Books
Queensland Premier's Literary Awards	Children's	Michael Stephens	Blat Magic	HarperCollins
Queensland Premier's Literary Awards	Young Adult	Markus Zusak	When Dogs Cry	Pan Macmillan
Victorian Premier's Literary Award	Young Adult Fiction	Meme McDonald and Boori Monty Pryor	Njunjul the Sun	Allen & Unwin
Western Australian Premier's Book Awards	Writing for Young Adults	Pat Lowe	Feeling the Heat	Penguin Books
Western Australian Premier's Book Awards	Children's	Mark Greenwood and Frané Lessac	The Legend of Moondyne Joe	Cygnet

=== Crime and Mystery ===
==== National ====
Award	Category	Author	Title	Publisher
Davitt Award	Novel	Carolyn Morwood	A Simple Death	Women's Press
Davitt Award	Novel	Kerry Greenwood	The Three-Pronged Dagger	Lothian
Davitt Award	Readers' Choice	Lindy Cameron	Bleeding Hearts	HarperCollins
Ned Kelly Award	Novel	Gabrielle Lord	Death Delights	Hodder Headline Australia
Ned Kelly Award	First novel	Bunty Avieson	Apartment 255	Pan Macmillan
Ned Kelly Award	First novel	Emma Darcy	Who Killed Angelique?	Pan Macmillan
Ned Kelly Award	True crime	Larry Writer	Razor	Pan Macmillan
Ned Kelly Award	True crime	Mike Richards	The Hanged Man	Scribe Publications
Ned Kelly Award	Teenage/YA	Ken Catran	Blue Murder	Lothian
Ned Kelly Award	Readers' vote	Bunty Avieson	Apartment 255	Pan Macmillan
Ned Kelly Award	Lifetime achievement	Patrick Gallagher		

=== Science fiction ===
Award	Category	Author	Title	Publisher
Aurealis Award	Sf Novel	Damien Broderick	Transcension	Tor Books
Aurealis Award	Sf Short Story	Sean McMullen	"Walk to the Full Moon"	F&SF
Aurealis Award	Fantasy Novel	Sean Williams	The Storm Weaver and the Sand	Voyager Books
Aurealis Award	Fantasy Short Story	No award presented		
Aurealis Award	Horror Novel	A. L. McCann	The White Body of Evening	Flamingo
Aurealis Award	Horror Short Story	Kim Westwood	"Oracle"	Redsine
Aurealis Award	Young Adult Novel	Sophie Masson	The Hand of Glory	Hodder Headline
Ditmar Award	Novel	Garth Nix	Lirael	Allen and Unwin
Ditmar Award	Short Fiction	Jack Dann	"The Diamond Pit"	Jubilee
Ditmar Award	Short Fiction	Lucy Sussex	"Absolute Uncertainty"	F&SF
Ditmar Award	Collected Work	Damien Broderick ed.	Earth is But a Star	UWA Press

=== Poetry ===
Award	Author	Title	Publisher
Adelaide Festival Awards for Literature	Cath Kenneally	Around Here	Wakefield Press
The Age Book of the Year	Robert Gray	Afterimages	Duffy and Snellgrove
Anne Elder Award	Bronwyn Lea	Flight Animals	University of Queensland Press
Grace Leven Prize for Poetry	Kate Lilley	Versary	Salt Publishing
Mary Gilmore Prize	Geraldine McKenzie	Duty	Paper Bark Press
New South Wales Premier's Literary Awards	Alan Wearne	The Lovemakers	Penguin Books
Victorian Premier's Literary Award	Robert Gray	Afterimages	Duffy and Snellgrove
Western Australian Premier's Book Awards	Barbara Temperton	Going Feral	Fremantle Arts Centre Press

=== Drama ===
Award	Author	Title	Publisher
Patrick White Playwrights' Award	Reg Cribb	Last Cab to Darwin	Last Cab Productions
Patrick White Playwrights' Award	Ian Wilding	Even Amongst Dogs	

=== Non-Fiction ===
Award	Category	Author	Title	Publisher
Adelaide Festival Awards for Literature	Non-Fiction	John Birmingham	Leviathan: The Unauthorised Biography of Sydney	Random House Australia
The Age Book of the Year	Non-Fiction	Don Watson	Recollections of a Bleeding Heart : A Portrait of Paul Keating PM	Random House Australia
National Biography Award	Biography	Jacqueline Kent	A Certain Style: Beatrice Davis, a Literary Life	Viking Books
New South Wales Premier's Literary Awards	Non-Fiction	Gail Bell	The Poison Principle	Pan Macmillan
New South Wales Premier's History Awards	Australian History	Nadia Wheatley	The Life and Myth of Charmian Clift	HarperCollins
New South Wales Premier's History Awards	Community and Regional History	John Bailey	The White Divers of Broome: the true story of a fatal experiment	Pan Macmillan
New South Wales Premier's History Awards	General History	David Garrioch	The Making of Revolutionary Paris	University of California Press
New South Wales Premier's History Awards	Young People's	Papunya School	Papunya School Book of Country and History	Allen and Unwin
Nita Kibble Literary Award		Inga Clendinnen	Tiger's Eye: A Memoir	Text Publishing
Queensland Premier's Literary Awards	Non-fiction	Brenda Niall	The Boyds: A Family Biography	Melbourne University Press
Queensland Premier's Literary Awards	History	Les Carlyon	Gallipoli	Pan Macmillan
Victorian Premier's Literary Award	Non-fiction	Brenda Niall	The Boyds: A Family Biography	Melbourne University Press

== Deaths ==
- 27 May – Ray Mathew, poet and novelist (born 1929)
- 6 June – Peter Cowan, short story writer and literary editor (born 1914)
- 25 August – Dorothy Hewett, poet (born 1923)
- 16 September – J. E. Macdonnell, novelist (born 1917)
- 2 October – R. A. Simpson, poet (born 1929)
- 8 December – Gary Catalano, poet and critic (born 1947)

Unknown date

- Olive Pell, librarian and poet (born 1903)

== See also ==
- 2002 in Australia
- 2002 in literature
- 2002 in poetry
- List of years in literature
- List of years in Australian literature
