= Ned Kelly Awards =

Australian literary award

- Awarded for: Excellence in Australian Crime fiction & true crime
- Country: Australia
- Presented by: Crime Writers Association of Australia
- First award: 1996
- Website: https://www.austcrimewriters.com/ned-kelly-awards

The Ned Kelly Awards (named for bushranger Ned Kelly) are Australia's leading literary awards for crime writing, in both the crime fiction and true crime genres. They were established in 1996 by the Crime Writers Association of Australia to reward excellence in the field of crime writing within Australia.

The genre of crime writing has long been popular, but it was not until the early 1990s that a local growth of writing within the genre occurred in Australia. By the middle of the decade support for the field had grown sufficiently that it was decided to establish the Ned Kelly Awards.

The awards are affectionately referred to as 'The Neddies' within the community.

== Categories ==
- Best First Novel
- Best True Crime
- Best Novel
- Best Teenage/Young Adult
- Readers Vote
- Best Non-Fiction
- Lifetime Achievement Awards

== Winners ==
=== 1990s ===
1990s Ned Kelly Award winners
Year	Best Novel	Best First Novel	Best Non-Fiction	Lifetime Achievement	Ref.
1996	The Malcontenta by Barry Maitland	Dark Angel by John Dale	—	Jon Cleary	
1996	Inside Dope by Paul Thomas	Dark Angel by John Dale	—	Jon Cleary	
1997	The Brush-Off by Shane Maloney	Bad Debts by Peter Temple	How to Write Crime edited by Marele Day	Alan Yates (aka Carter Brown)	
1997	The Brush-Off by Shane Maloney	Get Rich Quick by Peter Doyle	How to Write Crime edited by Marele Day	Alan Yates (aka Carter Brown)	
1998	—	—	—	—	—
1999	Amaze Your Friends by Peter Doyle	The Last Days by Andrew Masterson	—	Peter Corris	

=== 2000s ===
2000s Ned Kelly Award winners
Year	Best Novel	Best First Novel	Best True Crime	Best Teenage /Young Adult	Reader's Vote	Lifetime Achievement	Ref.
2000	Shooting Star by Peter Temple	The Wooden Leg of Inspector Anders by Marshall Browne	(tie) Huckstepp: A Dangerous Life by John Dale; Underbelly 3 by Andrew Rule and John Silvester	—	—	—	
2001	(tie) Dead Point by Peter Temple; The Second Coming by Andrew Masterson	Last Drinks by Andrew McGahan	Broken Lives by Estelle Blackburn	—	Bleeding Hearts by Lindy Cameron	Stephen Knight	
2002	Death Delights by Gabrielle Lord	(tie) Apartment 255 by Bunty Avieson; Who Killed Angelique? by Emma Darcy	(tie) Razor by Larry Writer; The Hanged Man by Mike Richards	Blue Murder by Ken Catran	Apartment 255 by Bunty Avieson	Patrick Gallagher	
2003	White Dog by Peter Temple	Blood Redemption by Alex Palmer	Blood Stain by Peter Lalor	—	—	Kerry Greenwood	
2004	Degrees of Connection by Jon Cleary	(tie) The Walker by Jane R. Goodall; Junkie Pilgrim by Wayne Grogan	Killing Juanita by Peter Rees	—	—	Bob Bottom	
2005	Lost by Michael Robotham	A Private Man by Malcolm Knox	(tie) Joe Cinque's Consolation by Helen Garner; Mr Big by Tony Reeves	—	—	Stuart Coupe	
2006	(tie) Crook as Rookwood by Chris Nyst; The Broken Shore by Peter Temple	Out of the Silence by Wendy James	Packing Death by Lauchlin McCulloch	—	—	Andrew Rule and John Silvester	
2007	Chain of Evidence by Garry Disher	Diamond Dove by Adrian Hyland	(tie) Written On The Skin by Liz Porter; Killing For Pleasure: The Definitive Story of the Snowtown Murders by Debi Marshall	—	—	Sandra Harvey and Lindsay Simpson	
2008	Shatter by Michael Robotham	The Low Road by Chris Womersley	Red Centre, Dark Heart by Evan McHugh	—	—	Marele Day	
2009	Deep Water by Peter Corris and Smoke and Mirrors by Kel Robertson	Ghostlines by Nick Gadd	The Tall Man by Chloe Hooper	—	—	Shane Maloney	

=== 2010s ===
2010s Ned Kelly Award winners
Year	Best Novel	Best First Novel	Best True Crime	Lifetime Achievement	Ref.
2010	Wyatt by Garry Disher	King of the Cross by Mark Dapin	Pitcairn: Paradise Lost by Kathy Marks	Peter Doyle	
2011	The Diggers Rest Hotel by Geoffrey McGeachin	Prime Cut by Alan Carter	Abandoned - The Sad Death of Dianne Brimble by Geesche Jacobsen	NA	
2012	Pig Boy by J. C. Burke	The Cartographer by Peter Twohig	Sins of the Father: The Untold Story Behind Schapelle Corby's Ill-Fated Drug Run by Eamonn Duff	Gabrielle Lord	
2013	Blackwattle Creek by Geoffrey McGeachin	The Midnight Promise by Zane Lovitt	The People Smuggler by Robin de Crespigny	NA	
2014	In the Morning I'll Be Gone by Adrian McKinty	Hades by Candice Fox	Murder in Mississippi by John Safran	NA	
2015	Eden by Candice Fox	Quota by Jock Serong	This House of Grief: The Story of a Murder Trial by Helen Garner	NA	
2016	Before It Breaks by Dave Warner	Resurrection Bay by Emma Viskic	Certain Admissions by Gideon Haigh	NA	
2017	Police at the Station and They Don't Look Friendly by Adrian McKinty	The Dry by Jane Harper	(tie) Getting Away With Murder by Duncan McNab; The Drowned Man by Brendan James Murray	NA	
2018	Crossing the Lines by Sulari Gentill	The Dark Lake by Sarah Bailey	Unmaking a Murder: The Mysterious Death of Anna-Jane Cheney by Graham Archer	Garry Disher	
2019	The Lost Man by Jane Harper	The Rúin by Dervla McTiernan	Eggshell Skull by Bri Lee	Bob Bottom	

=== 2020s ===
2020s Ned Kelly Award winners
Year	Best Novel	Best First Novel	Best True Crime	Best International Crime	Ref.
2020	The Wife and the Widow by Christian White	Present Tense by Natalie Conyer	Bowraville by Dan Box	The Chain by Adrian McKinty	
2021	Consolation by Garry Disher	The Second Son by Loraine Peck	Stalking Claremont by Bret Christian	We Begin at the End by Chris Whittaker	
2022	The Chase by Candice Fox	Banjawarn by Josh Kemp	Banquet: The Untold Story of Adelaide's Family Murders by Debi Marshall	The Maid by Nita Prose	
2023	Exiles by Jane Harper	Wake by Shelley Burr	Betrayed by Sandi Logan	The Lemon Man by Keith Bruton	
2024	Darling Girls by Sally Hepworth	Murder in the Pacific: Ifira Point by Matt Francis	Crossing the Line by Nick McKenzie	The Only Suspect by Louise Candlish	
2025	The Creeper by Margaret Hickey	All You Took From Me by Lisa Kenway	A Thousand Miles from Care by Steve Johnson	A Case of Matricide by Graeme Macrae Burnet	
2026	Mad Mabel by Sally Hepworth	In Bloom by Liz Allan	Duty to Warn by Charlotte Grieve	The Death of Us by Abigail Dean	

== Shortlists ==
=== 2000s ===
2000s Best Crime Novel winners and finalists
Year	Author	Title	Result	Ref.
2003	Peter Temple	White Dog	Winner	
2003	Bunty Avieson	The Affair	Finalist	
2003	Carmel Bird	Open For inspection	Finalist	
2003	Marshall Browne	The Eye of the Abyss	Finalist	
2003	Peter Corris	Salt and Blood	Finalist	
2003	Sandy Curtis	Deadly Tide	Finalist	
2003	Emma Darcy	Who Killed Bianca?	Finalist	
2003	Garry Disher	Kittyhawk Down	Finalist	
2003	Kerry Greenwood	Murder in Montparnasse	Finalist	
2003	Fred Guilhaus	The Analyst	Finalist	
2003	Michael Herrmann	Breakfast in Fur	Finalist	
2003	Gabrielle Lord	Baby Did a Bad Bad Thing	Finalist	
2003	Barry Maitland	Babel	Finalist	
2003	Shane Maloney	Something Fishy	Finalist	
2003	Andy Shea	The Chance	Finalist	
2003	Paul Thomas	The Empty Bed	Finalist	
2003	Emma Tom	Evidence	Finalist	
2005	Michael Robotham	Lost	Winner	
2005	Gabrielle Lord	Spiking the Girl	Finalist	
2005	Kirsty Brooks	The Happiness Punch	Finalist	
2005	Tara Moss	Covet	Finalist	
2005	Steve J. Spears	Murder by Manuscript	Finalist	
2005	Kerry Greenwood	Heavenly Pleasures	Finalist	
2005	Barry Maitland	No Trace	Finalist	
2005	Kerry Greenwood	Queen of the Flowers	Finalist	
2005	Wilson Greg	The Domino Game	Finalist	
2005	Sandy Curtis	Dangerous Deception	Finalist	
2005	Randall Longmire	Static	Finalist	
2005	Jane Clifton	A Hand in the Bush	Finalist	
2006	Chris Nyst	Crook as Rookwood	Winner	
2006	Peter Temple	The Broken Shore	Winner	
2006	Marshall Browne	Rendezvous at Kamakura Inn	Finalist	
2006	Peter Corris	Saving Billie	Finalist	
2006	Leigh Redhead	Rubdown	Finalist	
2006	Graham Reilly	Five Oranges	Finalist	
2007	Garry Disher	Chain of Evidence	Winner	
2007	Paul Cleave	The Cleaner	Finalist	
2007	Peter Corris	The Undertow	Finalist	
2007	Richard Flanagan	The Unknown Terrorist	Finalist	
2007	Barry Maitland	Spider Trap	Finalist	
2007	Michael Robotham	The Night Ferry	Finalist	

=== 2010s ===
2010s Best Crime Novel winners and finalists
Year	Author	Title	Result	Ref.
2010	Garry Disher	Wyatt	Winner	
2010	Lenny Bartulin	The Black Russian	Finalist	
2010	Michael Robotham	Bleed For Me	Finalist	
2011	Geoffrey McGeachin	The Diggers Rest Hotel	Winner	
2011	Angela Savage	The Half-Child	Finalist	
2011	Chris Womersley	Bereft	Finalist	
2012	J. C. Burke	Pig Boy	Winner	
2012	Malcolm Knox	The Life	Finalist	
2012	Barry Maitland	Chelsea Mansions	Finalist	
2013	Geoffrey McGeachin	Blackwattle Creek	Winner	
2013	Robert Gott	The Holiday Murders	Finalist	
2013	Katherine Howell	Web of Deceit	Finalist	
2013	Adrian McKinty	I Hear The Sirens In The Street	Finalist	
2013	Malla Nunn	Silent Valley	Finalist	
2014	Adrian McKinty	In The Morning I'll Be Gone	Winner	
2014	Garry Disher	Bitter Wash Road	Finalist	
2014	Kathryn Fox	Fatal Impact	Finalist	
2014	PM Newton	Beams Falling	Finalist	
2014	Stephen Orr	One Boy Missing	Finalist	
2014	Angela Savage	The Dying Beach	Finalist	
2015	Candice Fox	Eden	Winner	
2015	Peter Docker	Sweet One	Finalist	
2015	Sulari Gentill	A Murder Unmentioned	Finalist	
2015	Barry Maitland	Crucifixion Creek	Finalist	
2015	Adrian McKinty	Gun Street Girl	Finalist	
2015	Malla Nunn	Present Darkness	Finalist	
2016	Dave Warner	Before It Breaks	Winner	
2016	Mark Dapin	R&R	Finalist	
2016	Garry Disher	The Heat	Finalist	
2016	Candice Fox	Fall	Finalist	
2016	Barry Maitland	Ash Island	Finalist	
2016	Adrian McKinty	Rain Dogs	Finalist	
2017	Adrian McKinty	Police at the Station and They Don't Look Friendly	Winner	
2017	Candice Fox	Crimson Lake	Finalist	
2017	Wendy James	The Golden Child	Finalist	
2017	Emily Maguire	An Isolated Incident	Finalist	
2017	Jock Serong	The Rules of Backyard Cricket	Finalist	
2017	Ann Turner	Out of the Ice	Finalist	
2018	Sulari Gentill	Crossing the Lines	Winner	
2018	Alan Carter	Marlborough Man	Finalist	
2018	Garry Disher	Under Cold Bright Lights	Finalist	
2018	Candice Fox	Redemption Point	Finalist	
2018	Anna George	The Lone Child	Finalist	
2018	Iain Ryan	The Student	Finalist	
2019	Jane Harper	The Lost Man	Winner	
2019	Garry Disher	Kill Shot: A Wyatt Thriller	Finalist	
2019	Candice Fox	Gone by Midnight	Finalist	
2019	Kerry Greenwood	The Spotted Dog	Finalist	
2019	Michael Robotham	The Other Wife	Finalist	
2019	Sue Williams	Live and Let Fry	Finalist	

=== 2020s ===
2020s Best Crime Novel winners and finalists
Year	Author	Title	Result	Ref.
2020	Christian White	The Wife and the Widow	Winner	
2020	Pip Drysdale	The Strangers We Know	Finalist	
2020	Nick Gadd	Death of a Typographer	Finalist	
2020	Dervla McTiernan	The Scholar	Finalist	
2020	Dave Warner	River of Salt	Finalist	
2020	David Whish-Wilson	True West	Finalist	
2021	Garry Disher	Consolation	Winner	
2021	Candice Fox	Gathering Dark	Finalist	
2021	Sulari Gentill	A Testament of Character	Finalist	
2021	Jane Harper	The Survivors	Finalist	
2021	Dervla McTiernan	The Good Turn	Finalist	
2021	J. P. Pomare	Tell Me Lies	Finalist	
2021	Michael Robotham	When She Was Good	Finalist	
2021	Sarah Thornton	White Throat	Finalist	
2022	Candice Fox	The Chase	Winner	
2022	Tim Ayliffe	The Enemy Within	Finalist	
2022	Mark Brandi	The Others	Finalist	
2022	B M Carroll	You Had it Coming	Finalist	
2022	Jack Heath	Kill Your Brother	Finalist	
2022	Debra Oswald	The Family Doctor	Finalist	
2022	Kyle Perry	The Deep	Finalist	
2023	Jane Harper	Exiles	Winner	
2023	Aoife Clifford	When We Fall	Finalist	
2023	Chris Hammer	The Tilt	Finalist	
2023	Sally Hepworth	Soulmate	Finalist	
2023	Katherine Kovacic	Seven Sisters	Finalist	
2023	Michael Robotham	Lying Beside You	Finalist	
2023	Emma Viskic	Those Who Perish	Finalist	
2023	Greg Woodland	The Carnival Is Over	Finalist	
2024	Sally Hepworth	Darling Girls	Winner	
2024	Tim Ayliffe	Killer Traitor Spy	Finalist	
2024	Ashley Kalagian Blunt	Dark Mode	Finalist	
2024	Shelley Burr	Ripper	Finalist	
2024	Megan Goldin	Dark Corners	Finalist	
2024	Chris Hammer	The Seven	Finalist	
2024	Amanda Hampson	The Tea Ladies	Finalist	
2024	Benjamin Stevenson	Everyone On This Train is a Suspect	Finalist	
2025	Margaret Hickey	The Creeper	Winner	
2025	Natalie Conyer	Shadow City	Finalist	
2025	Garry Disher	Sanctuary	Finalist	
2025	Fiona Hardy	Unbury the Dead	Finalist	
2025	Ashley Kalagian Blunt	Cold Truth	Finalist	
2025	Fiona McFarlane	Highway 13	Finalist	
2025	J. P. Pomare	17 Years Later	Finalist	
2025	Michael Robotham	Storm Child	Finalist	
2026	Sally Hepworth	Mad Mabel	Winner	
2026	Jack Beaumont	Liar's Game	Finalist	
2026	Jane Caro	Lyrebird	Finalist	
2026	Susi Fox	The Other Child	Finalist	
2026	Karen Herbert	The Ghost Walk	Finalist	
2026	Daniel Oakman	Fire in the Head	Finalist	
2026	Michael Robotham	The White Crow	Finalist	
2026	Iain Ryan	The Casino	Finalist	

=== 2010s ===
2010s Best Debut Crime Novel winners and finalists
Year	Author	Title	Result	Ref.
2010	Mark Dapin	King of the Cross	Winner	
2010	Robin Adair	Death and the Running Patterer	Finalist	
2010	Andrew Coome	Document Z	Finalist	
2011	Alan Carter	Prime Cut	Winner	
2011	P.M. Newton	The Old School	Finalist	
2011	David Whish-Wilson	Line of Sight	Finalist	
2012	Peter Twohig	The Cartographer	Winner	
2012	Claire Corbett	When We Have Wings	Finalist	
2012	Kim Westwood	The Courier's New Bicycle	Finalist	
2013	Zane Lovitt	The Midnight Promise	Winner	
2013	Paul Anderson	The Robbers	Finalist	
2013	Andrew Grimes	The Richmond Conspiracy	Finalist	
2013	Steve Lewis and Chris Uhlmann	The Marmalade Files	Finalist	
2013	Sue Williams	Murder with the Lot	Finalist	
2014	Candice Fox	Hades	Winner	
2014	Peter Cotton	Dead Cat Bounce	Finalist	
2014	Alex Hammond	Blood Witness	Finalist	
2014	Ellie Marney	Every Breath	Finalist	
2015	Jock Serong	Quota	Winner	
2015	Nigel Bartlett	King of the Road	Finalist	
2015	Anna George	What Came Before	Finalist	
2015	Nicholas J. Johnson	Chasing the Ace	Finalist	
2016	Emma Viskic	Resurrection Bay	Winner	
2016	Tania Chandler	Please Don't Leave Me Here	Finalist	
2016	J. M. Green	Good Money	Finalist	
2016	Mark Hollands	Amplify	Finalist	
2016	Gary Kemble	Skin Deep	Finalist	
2016	Iain Ryan	Four Days	Finalist	
2017	Jane Harper	The Dry	Winner	
2017	Ron Elliott	Burn Patterns	Finalist	
2017	Andy Muir	Something for Nothing	Finalist	
2017	Anna Snoekstra	Only Daughter	Finalist	
2017	Holly Throsby	Goodwood	Finalist	
2017	Laura Elizabeth Woollett	The Love of a Bad Man	Finalist	
2018	Sarah Bailey	The Dark Lake	Winner	
2018	Mark Brandi	Wimmera	Finalist	
2018	Megan Goldin	The Girl in Keller's Way	Finalist	
2018	Sarah Schmidt	See What I Have Done	Finalist	
2019	Dervla McTiernan	The Rúin	Winner	
2019	Katherine Kovacic	The Portrait of Molly Dean	Finalist	
2019	Emily O'Grady	The Yellow House	Finalist	
2019	Ben Stevenson	Greenlight	Finalist	

=== 2020s ===
2020s Best Debut Crime Novel winners and finalists
Year	Author	Title	Result	Ref.
2020	Natalie Conyer	Present Tense	Winner	
2020	Susan Hurley	Eight Lives	Finalist	
2020	Karina Kilmore	Where the Truth Lies	Finalist	
2020	R W R McDonald	The Nancys	Finalist	
2020	Petronella McGovern	Six Minutes	Finalist	
2020	Sarah Thornton	Lapse	Finalist	
2021	Lorraine Peck	The Second Son	Winner	
2021	Rae Cairns	The Good Mother	Finalist	
2021	Kyle Perry	The Bluffs	Finalist	
2021	Greg Woodlands	The Night Whistler	Finalist	
2022	Josh Kemp	Banjawarn	Winner	
2022	Bryan Brown	Sweet Jimmy	Finalist	
2022	Suzanne Frankham	Shadow Over Edmund Street	Finalist	
2022	Margaret Hickey	Cutters End	Finalist	
2023	Shelley Burr	Wake	Winner	
2023	Jo Dixon	The House of Now and Then	Finalist	
2023	Joanna Jenkins	How to Kill a Client	Finalist	
2023	Kerryn Mayne	Lenny Marks Gets Away with Murder	Finalist	
2023	Hayley Scrivenor	Dirt Town	Finalist	
2023	Matthew Spencer	Black River	Finalist	
2023	Emma Styles	No Country for Girls	Finalist	
2023	James McKenzie Watson	Denizen	Finalist	
2024	Matt Francis	Murder in the Pacific: Ifira Point	Winner	
2024	Fiona Britton	Violet Kelly and the Jade Owl	Finalist	
2024	Lucy Campbell	Lowbridge	Finalist	
2024	Rhys Gard	Four Dogs Missing	Finalist	
2024	Troy Hunter	Gus and the Missing Boy	Finalist	
2024	Darcy Tindale	The Fall Between	Finalist	
2024	P. A. Thomas	The Beacon	Finalist	
2025	Lisa Kenway	All You Took from Me	Winner	
2025	Shaeden Berry	Down the Rabbit Hole	Finalist	
2025	Riley James	The Chilling	Finalist	
2025	Mitch Jennings	A Town Called Treachery	Finalist	
2025	Martine Kropkowski	Everywhere We Look	Finalist	
2025	Claire Sutherland	The Crag	Finalist	
2026	Liz Allan	In Bloom	Winner	
2026	Madeleine Cleary	The Butterfly Women	Finalist	
2026	Sam Guthrie	The Peak	Finalist	
2026	Angie Faye Martin	Melaleuca	Finalist	
2026	Laura McCluskey	The Wolf Tree	Finalist	
2026	Alexandra Strnad	The Wykehamist	Finalist	

=== Best International Crime Novel ===
Best International Crime Novel winners and finalists
Year	Author	Title	Result	Ref.
2020	Adrian McKinty	The Chain	Winner	
2021	Chris Whitaker	We Begin at the End	Winner	
2021	Lucy Foley	The Guest List	Finalist	
2021	Charity Norman	The Secrets of Strangers	Finalist	
2021	Sara Sligar	Take Me Apart	Finalist	
2021	Don Winslow	Broken	Finalist	
2022	Nita Prose	The Maid	Winner	
2022	Graeme Macrae Burnet	Case Study	Finalist	
2022	Ann Cleeves	The Heron's Cry	Finalist	
2022	Hans Rosenfeldt	Cry Wolf	Finalist	
2023	Keith Bruton	The Lemon Man	Winner	
2023	Tom Baragwanath	Paper Cage	Finalist	
2023	Nicci French	The Favour	Finalist	
2023	Gerwin van der Werf	The Hitchhiker	Finalist	
2024	Louise Candlish	The Only Suspect	Winner	
2024	Claire Baylis	Dice	Finalist	
2024	Eleanor Catton	Birnam Wood	Finalist	
2024	Michael Connelly	Resurrection Walk	Finalist	
2024	Hannah Richell	The Search Party	Finalist	
2024	Ruth Ware	Zero Days	Finalist	
2025	Graeme Macrae Burnet	A Case of Matricide	Winner	
2025	Michael Bennett	Return to Blood	Finalist	
2025	Jacqueline Bublitz	Leave the Girls Behind	Finalist	
2025	Michael Connelly	The Waiting	Finalist	
2025	David McCloskey	Moscow X	Finalist	
2025	Charity Norman	Home Truths	Finalist	
2026	Abigail Dean	The Death of Us	Winner	
2026	Tom Baragwanath	Lucky Thing	Finalist	
2026	Graeme Macrae Burnet	Benbecula	Finalist	
2026	Michael Connelly	The Proving Ground	Finalist	

=== Best True Crime ===
Best True Crime winners and finalists
Year	Author	Title	Result	Ref.
2010	Kathy Marks	Pitcairn: Paradise Lost	Winner	
2010	Peter Doyle	Crooks like Us	Finalist	
2010	Robert M. Kaplan	Medical Murder: Disturbing Cases of Doctors Who Kill	Finalist	
2011	Geesche Jacobson	Abandoned: The Sad Death of Dianne Brimble	Winner	
2011	Ross Honeywill	Wasted	Finalist	
2011	Lindsay Simpson and Jennifer Cooke	Honeymoon Dive	Finalist	
2012	Eamonn Duff	Sins of the Father	Winner	
2012	Michael Duffy	Call Me Cruel	Finalist	
2012	Liz Porter	Cold Case File	Finalist	
2013	Robin de Crespigny	The People Smuggler	Winner	
2013	Belinda Hawkins	Every Parent's Nightmare	Finalist	
2013	Steve Lillebuen	The Devil's Cinema	Finalist	
2013	Derek Pedley	Dead by Friday	Finalist	
2013	Mark Tedeschi	Eugenia	Finalist	
2014	John Safran	Murder in Mississippi	Winner	
2014	Paul Dale	Disgraced?	Finalist	
2014	John Kidman and Denise Hofman	Forever Nine	Finalist	
2014	Eleanor Learmonth and Jenny Tabakoff	No Mercy	Finalist	
2014	Colin McLaren	JFK: The Smoking Gun	Finalist	
2014	Duncan McNab	Outlaw Bikers in Australia	Finalist	
2015	Helen Garner	This House of Grief: The Story of a Murder Trial	Winner	
2015	Amy Dale	The Fall	Finalist	
2015	Debi Marshall	The Family Court Murders	Finalist	
2015	Kate McClymont and Linton Besser	He Who Must Be Obeid	Finalist	
2015	David Murray	The Murder of Allison Baden-Clay	Finalist	
2015	Liam Pieper	The Feel-Good Hit of the Year	Finalist	
2016	Gideon Haigh	Certain Admissions	Winner	
2016	Kate Kyriacou	The Sting	Finalist	
2016	Martin Mckenzie-Murray	A Murder Without Motive	Finalist	
2016	Rebecca Poulson	Killing Love	Finalist	
2016	Mark Tedeschi	Kidnapped	Finalist	
2017	Duncan McNab	Getting Away with Murder	Winner	
2017	Brendan James Murray	The Drowned Man	Winner	
2017	Colin Dillon	Code of Silence	Finalist	
2017	Duncan McNab	Roger Rogerson	Finalist	
2017	Terry Smyth	Denny Day	Finalist	
2017	Mark Tedeschi	Murder at Myall Creek	Finalist	
2018	Graham Archer	Unmaking A Murder: The Mysterious Death of Anna Jane Cheney	Winner	
2018	Mark Abernethy	The Contractor	Finalist	
2018	Tanya Bretherton	The Suitcase Baby	Finalist	
2018	Gabriella Coslovich	Whiteley on Trial	Finalist	
2018	Campbell McConachie	The Fatalist	Finalist	
2019	Bri Lee	Eggshell Skull	Winner	
2019	Chloe Hooper	The Arsonist	Finalist	
2019	Deborah Snow	Siege: Inside the Lindt Cafe	Finalist	
2019	Kate Wild	Waiting for Elijah	Finalist	
2020	Dan Box	Bowraville	Winner	
2020	Kate McClymont	Dead Man Walking: The murky world of Michael McGurk and Ron Medich	Finalist	
2020	Phillip Roope and Kevin Meagher	Shark Arm	Finalist	
2020	Angela Williams	Snakes and Ladders	Finalist	
2021	Bret Christian	Stalking Claremont: Inside the hunt for a serial killer	Winner	
2021	Tanya Bretherton	The Husband Poisoner	Finalist	
2021	Mark Dapin	Public Enemies	Finalist	
2021	Tom Doig	Hazelwood	Finalist	
2021	Louise Milligan	Witness	Finalist	
2022	Debi Marshall	Banquet: The untold story of Adelaide's family murders	Winner	
2022	Caroline Graham and Kylie Stevenson	Larrimah	Finalist	
2022	Amani Haydar	The Mother Wound	Finalist	
2022	Drew Rooke	A Witness of Fact	Finalist	
2023	Sandi Logan	Betrayed	Winner	
2023	Officer A	Tiger! Tiger! Tiger!	Finalist	
2023	Ellis Gunn	Rattled	Finalist	
2023	Megan Norris	Out of the Ashes	Finalist	
2023	Geoff Plunkett	Death Row at Truro	Finalist	
2024	Nick McKenzie	Crossing the Line	Winner	
2024	Michael Adams	The Murder Squad	Finalist	
2024	Marele Day	Reckless	Finalist	
2024	David Marr	Killing for Country	Finalist	
2024	Hedley Thomas	The Teacher's Pet	Finalist	
2025	Steve Johnson	A Thousand Miles from Care	Winner	
2025	Michael Adams	They'll Never Hold Me	Finalist	
2025	Quentin McDermott	Meadow's Law	Finalist	
2025	Neil Mercer	The Kingpin and the Crooked Cop	Finalist	
2025	Lucia Osborne-Crowley	The Lasting Harm	Finalist	
2026	Charlotte Grieve	Duty to Warn	Winner	
2026	Stuart Coupe	Saffron Incorporated	Finalist	
2026	Greg Haddrick	The Mushroom Murders	Finalist	
2026	Derek Pedley	The Postcard Bandit	Finalist	
2026	Kate Wild	The Red House	Finalist	

== See also ==
- List of Australian literary awards
