= 2017 in Australian literature =

This article presents a list of the historical events and publications of Australian literature during 2017.

== Major publications ==
=== Literary fiction ===
- Peter Carey – A Long Way from Home
- Steven Carroll – A New England Affair
- Felicity Castagna – No More Boats
- J. M. Coetzee – The Schooldays of Jesus
- Michelle de Kretser – The Life to Come
- Robert Drewe – Whipbird
- Richard Flanagan – First Person
- Eva Hornung – The Last Garden
- Sofie Laguna – The Choke
- Alex Miller – The Passage of Love
- Gerald Murnane – Border Districts
- Bram Presser – The Book of Dirt
- Mirandi Riwoe – The Fish Girl
- Kim Scott – Taboo
- Jock Serong – On the Java Ridge

=== Short story collections ===
- Melanie Cheng – Australia Day

=== Children's and Young Adult fiction ===
- Judith Clarke – My Lovely Frankie
- Zana Fraillon – The Ones That Disappeared
- Morris Gleitzman – Maybe
- Andy Griffiths
  - The Tree House Fun Book 2
  - The 91-Storey Treehouse
- Jessica Townsend – Nevermoor: The Trials of Morrigan Crow

=== Crime ===
- Sarah Bailey — The Dark Lake
- Alan Carter — Marlborough Man
- Peter Corris — Win, Lose or Draw
- Garry Disher — Under the Cold Bright Lights
- Sulari Gentill — Crossing the Lines
- Anna George — The Lone Child
- Jane Harper – Force of Nature
- Wendy James – The Golden Child
- Adrian McKinty — Police at the Station and They Don't Look Friendly
- Michael Robotham — The Secrets She Keeps
- Iain Ryan — The Student
- Sarah Schmidt — See What I Have Done
- Ann Turner — Out of the Ice
- Emma Viskic – And Fire Came Down

=== Science Fiction, Fantasy and Speculative fiction ===
- Claire G. Coleman – Terra Nullius
- Thoraiya Dyer – Crossroads of Canopy
- Greg Egan
  - Dichronauts
  - "Uncanny Valley"
- Ian Irvine – The Fatal Gate
- Kris Kneen – An Uncertain Grace
- Catherine McKinnon – Storyland
- Jane Rawson – From the Wreck
- Angela Slatter – Corpselight
- Cat Sparks – Lotus Blue

=== Poetry ===
- Michael Farrell – I Love Poetry
- Bella Li – Argosy
- Jennifer Maiden – The Metronome
- Alan Wearne – These Things Are Real
- Fiona Wright – Domestic Interior

=== Drama ===
- Tommy Murphy – Mark Colvin's Kidney
- Alana Valentine & Ursula Yovich – Barbara and the Camp Dogs

=== Biographies ===
- Bernadette Brennan – A Writing Life: Helen Garner and Her Work
- Judith Brett — The Enigmatic Mr Deakin
- Brentley Frazer – Scoundrel Days: A Memoir
- Sarah Krasnostein – The Trauma Cleaner

=== Non-fiction ===
- Peter FitzSimons – Burke and Wills: The Triumph and Tragedy of Australia's Most Famous Explorers
- Kate Grenville – The Case Against Fragrance
- John Safran – Depends What You Mean by Extremist
- Alexis Wright – Tracker

== Awards and honours ==
Note: these awards were presented in the year in question.

=== Lifetime achievement ===
Award	Author
Patrick White Award	Tony Birch

=== Literary ===
Award	Author	Title	Publisher
ALS Gold Medal	Zoe Morrison	Music and Freedom	Random House
Colin Roderick Award	Josephine Wilson	Extinctions	UWA Publishing
Indie Book Awards Book of the Year	Jane Harper	The Dry	Macmillan
Nita Kibble Literary Award	Not awarded		
Stella Prize	Heather Rose	The Museum of Modern Love	Allen & Unwin
Victorian Prize for Literature	Leah Purcell	The Drover's Wife	Currency Press

=== Fiction ===
==== National ====
Award	Author	Title	Publisher
Adelaide Festival Awards for Literature	Not awarded		
The Australian/Vogel Literary Award	Marija Peričić	The Lost Pages	Allen & Unwin
Barbara Jefferis Award	Not awarded		
Indie Book Awards Book of the Year – Fiction	Dominic Smith	The Last Painting of Sara de Vos	Sarah Crichton Books
Indie Book Awards Book of the Year – Debut Fiction	Jane Harper	The Dry	Macmillan
Miles Franklin Award	Josephine Wilson	Extinctions	UWA Publishing
Prime Minister's Literary Awards	Ryan O'Neill	Their Brilliant Careers	Black Inc
New South Wales Premier's Literary Awards	Heather Rose	The Museum of Modern Love	Allen & Unwin
Queensland Literary Awards	Melissa Ashley	The Birdman’s Wife	Affirm Press
Victorian Premier's Literary Award	Georgia Blain	Between a Wolf and a Dog	Scribe
Western Australian Premier's Book Awards	Not awarded		
Voss Literary Prize	Mark O'Flynn	The Last Days of Ava Langdon	University of Queensland Press

=== Children and Young Adult ===
==== National ====
Award	Category	Author	Title	Publisher
Children's Book of the Year Award	Older Readers	Claire Zorn	One Would Think the Deep	UQP
Children's Book of the Year Award	Younger Readers	Trace Balla	Rockhopping	Allen & Unwin
Children's Book of the Year Award	Picture Book	Bob Graham	Home in the Rain	Walker Books
Children's Book of the Year Award	Early Childhood	Johanna Bell, illus. Dion Beasley	Go Home, Cheeky Animals!	Allen & Unwin
Indie Book Awards Book of the Year	Children's	Jeannie Baker	Circle	Walker Books
Indie Book Awards Book of the Year	Young Adult	Cath Crowley	Words in Deep Blue	Pan MacMillan
New South Wales Premier's Literary Awards	Children's	Leanne Hall	Iris and the Tiger	Text Publishing
New South Wales Premier's Literary Awards	Young People's	James Roy and Noël Zihabamwe	One Thousand Hills	Omnibus Books, Scholastic Australia
Victorian Premier's Literary Award	Young Adult Fiction	Randa Abdel-Fattah	When Michael Met Mina	Pan Australia

=== Crime and Mystery ===
==== International ====
Award	Author	Title	Publisher
CWA Gold Dagger Award	Jane Harper	The Dry	Macmillan Publishers

==== National ====
Award	Category	Author	Title	Publisher
Davitt Award	Novel	Jane Harper	The Dry	Macmillan Publishers
Davitt Award	Young adult novel	Shivaun Plozza	Frankie	Penguin
Davitt Award	Children's novel	Judith Rossell	Wormwood Mire: A Stella Montgomery Intrigue	HarperCollins
Davitt Award	True crime	Megan Norris	Look What You Made Me Do: Fathers Who Kill	Big Sky Publishing
Davitt Award	Debut novel	Cath Ferla	Ghost Girls	Echo Publishing
Davitt Award	Readers' choice	Jane Harper	The Dry	Macmillan Publishers
Ned Kelly Award	Novel	Adrian McKinty	Police at the Station and They Don't Look Friendly	Seventh Street Books
Ned Kelly Award	First novel	Jane Harper	The Dry	Macmillan Publishers
Ned Kelly Award	True crime	Duncan McNab	Getting Away With Murder	Random House
Ned Kelly Award	True crime	Brendan James Murray	The Drowned Man	Echo Publishing
Ned Kelly Award	Lifetime achievement	Not awarded		

=== Science fiction ===
Award	Category	Author	Title	Publisher
Aurealis Award	Sf Novel	Jane Rawson	From the Wreck	Transit Lounge
Aurealis Award	Sf Short Story	Garth Nix	"Conversations with an Armoury"	Solaris (Infinity Wars)
Aurealis Award	Fantasy Novel	Jay Kristoff	Godsgrave	HarperCollins Publishers
Aurealis Award	Fantasy Short Story	Tansy Rayner Roberts	"The Curse is Come Upon Me, Cried"	Please Look After This Angel & Other Winged Stories (self-published)
Aurealis Award	Horror Novel	Lois Murphy	Soon	Transit Lounge
Aurealis Award	Horror Short Story	J Ashley-Smith	"Old Growth"	IFWG Publishing Australia (SQ Mag 31)
Aurealis Award	Young Adult Novel	Cally Black	In the Dark Spaces	Hardie Grant Egmont
Aurealis Award	Young Adult Short Story	Tansy Rayner Roberts	"Girl Reporter"	Girl Reporter (Book Smugglers)
Ditmar Award	Novel	Kaaron Warren	The Grief Hole	IWFG Publishing Australia
Ditmar Award	Best Novella or Novelette	Tansy Rayner Roberts	"Did We Break the End of the World?"	Defying Doomsday (Twelfth Planet Press)
Ditmar Award	Best Short Story	Cat Sparks	"No Fat Chicks"	In Your Face (TableCroft Publishing)

=== Poetry ===
Award	Author	Title	Publisher
Adelaide Festival Awards for Literature	Not awarded		
Anne Elder Award	Berndt Sellheim	Awake at the Wheel	Vagabond Press
Mary Gilmore Award	Aden Rolfe	False Nostalgia	Giramondo Publishing
Prime Minister's Literary Awards	Anthony Lawrence	Headwaters	Pitt Street Poetry
New South Wales Premier's Literary Awards	Peter Boyle	Ghostspeaking	Vagabond Press
Queensland Literary Awards	Antigone Kefala	Fragments	Giramondo Publishing
Victorian Premier's Literary Award	Maxine Beneba Clarke	Carrying the World	Hachette Australia
Western Australian Premier's Book Awards	Not awarded		

=== Drama ===
Award	Category	Author	Title	Publisher
New South Wales Premier's Literary Awards	Script	Shirley Birse	The Code, Series 2, Episode 4	Playmaker
Patrick White Playwrights' Award	Award	Kim Ho	Mirror's Edge	Sydney Theatre Company
Patrick White Playwrights' Award	Fellowship	Sue Smith		

=== Non-Fiction ===
Award	Category	Author	Title	Publisher
Adelaide Festival Awards for Literature	Non-Fiction	Not awarded		
Indie Book Awards Book of the Year	Non-Fiction	Helen Garner	Everywhere I Look	Text Publishing
National Biography Award	Biography	Tom D C Roberts	Before Rupert: Keith Murdoch and the Birth of a Dynasty	UQP
New South Wales Premier's Literary Awards	Non-Fiction	Thornton McCamish	Our Man Elsewhere: In Search of Alan Moorehead	Black Inc
New South Wales Premier's History Awards	Australian History	Mark McKenna	From the Edge: Australia’s Lost Histories	Melbourne University Publishing
New South Wales Premier's History Awards	Community and Regional History	Peter Hobbins, Ursula K Frederick and Anne Clarke	Stories from the Sandstone: Quarantine Inscriptions from Australia’s Immigrant Past	Arbon Publishing
New South Wales Premier's History Awards	General History	Sandra Wilson, Robert Cribb, Beatrice Trefalt and Dean Aszkielowicz	Japanese War Criminals: The Politics of Justice after the Second World War	Columbia University Press
Queensland Literary Awards	Non-Fiction	Cathy McLennan	Saltwater	University of Queensland Press
Victorian Premier's Literary Award	Non-fiction	Madeline Gleeson	Offshore: Behind the Wire on Manus and Nauru	NewSouth Publishing

== Deaths ==
- 12 January – Jill Roe, historian, academic and author (born 1940)
- 10 March – Bill Leak, editorial and political cartoonist, caricaturist and portraitist (born 1956)
- 9 April – John Clarke, comedian, writer and satirist (born 1948 in New Zealand)
- 22 April – Donna Williams, writer, artist, singer-songwriter, screenwriter and sculptor (born 1963)
- 2 May – Michael Gurr, playwright, author, speech writer and screenwriter (born 1961)
- 3 May – Rosie Scott, novelist and lecturer (born 1948 in Wellington, New Zealand)
- 26 June – Jimmy Chi, playwright and composer (born 1948)
- 27 June – Rae Desmond Jones, poet, novelist, short story writer and politician (born 1941)
- 2 July – Fay Zwicky, poet, short-story writer, critic and academic best known for her autobiographical poem Kaddish, about her identity as a Jewish writer (born 1933)
- 3 August – Jack Wodhams, science fiction writer (born 1931 in London)
- 6 November – Sylvia Lawson, historian, journalist and critic (born 1932)
- 1 December – Ken Inglis, historian (born 1929)
- 22 December – Lilith Norman, children's writer and editor (born 1927)

== See also ==
- 2017 in Australia
- 2017 in literature
- 2017 in poetry
- List of years in Australian literature
- List of years in literature
- List of Australian literary awards
