= 2019 in Australian literature =

This is a list of historical events and publications of Australian literature during 2019.

== Major publications ==
=== Literary fiction ===
- Tony Birch – The White Girl
- David Brooks – The Grass Library
- Steven Carroll – The Year of the Beast
- Melanie Cheng – Room for a Stranger
- Peggy Frew – Islands
- Peter Goldsworthy – Minotaur
- John Hughes – No One
- Anna Krien – Act of Grace
- Melina Marchetta – The Place on Dalhousie
- Andrew McGahan – The Rich Man's House (posthumous)
- Gerald Murnane – A Season on Earth
- Favel Parrett – There Was Still Love
- Heather Rose – Bruny
- Philip Salom – The Returns
- Carrie Tiffany – Exploded View
- Lucy Treloar – Wolfe Island
- Christos Tsiolkas – Damascus
- Tara June Winch – The Yield
- Charlotte Wood – The Weekend

=== Short stories ===
- Debra Adelaide – Zebra: And Other Stories
- Yumna Kassab – The House of Youssef
- Josephine Rowe – Here Until August

=== Children's and young adult fiction ===
- Alison Evans – Highway Bodies
- Mem Fox – The Tiny Star
- Helena Fox – How It Feels to Float
- Will Kostakis – Monuments
- Tania McCartney – Fauna: Australia's Most Curious Creatures
- Meg McKinlay – Catch a Falling Star
- Bruce Pascoe – Young Dark Emu
- Holden Sheppard – Invisible Boys
- Vikki Wakefield – This is How We Change the Ending

=== Crime and mystery ===
- Matthew Condon – The Night Dragon
- Pip Drysdale – The Strangers We Know
- Candice Fox – Gone By Midnight
- Nick Gadd – Death of a Typographer
- Tara Moss – Dead Man Switch
- Michael Robotham – Good Girl, Bad Girl
- Dave Warner – River of Salt
- Christian White – The Wife and the Widow

=== Science fiction ===
- John Birmingham – The Cruel Stars
- Claire G. Coleman – The Old Lie
- Greg Egan
  - The Best of Greg Egan
  - Perihelion Summer
  - "The Slipway"
  - "This Is Not the Way Home"
- Jay Kristoff – Darkdawn
- Garth Nix – Angel Mage

=== Poetry ===
- Louise Crisp – Yuiquimbiang
- Zenobia Frost – After the Demolition
- Charmaine Papertalk Green – Nganajungu Yagu
- L. K. Holt – Birth Plan
- Gerald Murnane – Green Shadows and Other Poems
- Pi O – Heide

=== Non-fiction ===
- Jane Caro – Accidental Feminists
- Maxine Beneba Clarke, with Magan Magan and Ahmed Yussuf (editors) – Growing Up African in Australia
- Helen Ennis – Olive Cotton: A Life in Photography
- Stan Grant
  - Australia Day
  - On Identity
- Nicholas Hasluck – Beyond the Equator: An Australian Memoir
- Jess Hill – See What You Made Me Do
- Jacqueline Kent – Beyond Words: A Year with Kenneth Cook
- Caro Llewellyn – Diving into Glass
- Emily Maguire – This is What a Feminist Looks Like
- Bianca Nogrady (editor) – The Best Australian Science Writing 2019
- Christina Thompson – Sea People: The Puzzle of Polynesia

== Awards and honours ==
Note: these awards were presented in the year in question.

=== Lifetime achievement ===
Award	Author
Patrick White Award	Jordie Albiston

=== Literary ===
Award	Author	Title	Publisher
ALS Gold Medal	Pam Brown	click here for what we do	Vagabond Press
Colin Roderick Award	Robert Drewe	The True Colour of the Sea	Hamish Hamilton
Indie Book Awards Book of the Year	Trent Dalton	Boy Swallows Universe	Fourth Estate
New South Wales Premier's Literary Awards	Billy Griffiths	Deep Time Dreaming: Uncovering Ancient Australia	Black Inc
Stella Prize	Vicki Laveau-Harvie	The Erratics	Fourth Estate
Victorian Premier's Literary Awards	Behrouz Boochani	No Friend But the Mountains	Belvoir and Co-Curious

=== Fiction ===
==== National ====
Award	Author	Title	Publisher
Adelaide Festival Awards for Literature	Not awarded		
The Australian/Vogel Literary Award	Not awarded		
Barbara Jefferis Award	Not awarded		
Indie Book Awards Book of the Year – Fiction	Markus Zusak	Bridge of Clay	Picador
Indie Book Awards Book of the Year – Debut Fiction	Trent Dalton	Boy Swallows Universe	Fourth Estate
Miles Franklin Award	Melissa Lucashenko	Too Much Lip	University of Queensland Press
Prime Minister's Literary Awards	Gail Jones	The Death of Noah Glass	Text Publishing
New South Wales Premier's Literary Awards	Michelle de Kretser	The Life to Come	Allen & Unwin
Queensland Literary Awards	Carrie Tiffany	Exploded View	Text Publishing
Victorian Premier's Literary Awards	Elise Valmorbida	The Madonna of the Mountains	Faber & Faber
Voss Literary Prize	Tim Winton	The Shepherd's Hut	Hamish Hamilton

=== Children and Young Adult ===
==== National ====
Award	Category	Author	Title	Publisher
Children's Book of the Year Award	Older Readers	Clare Atkins	Between Us	Black Inc.
Children's Book of the Year Award	Younger Readers	Emily Rodda	His Name Was Walter	HarperCollins
Children's Book of the Year Award	Picture Book	Shaun Tan	Cicada	Lothian
Children's Book of the Year Award	Early Childhood	Alison Lester	Trick's Bad Day	Affirm
Children's Book of the Year Award	Eve Pownall Award for Information Books	Coral Vass, illustrated by Dub Leffler	Sorry Day	National Library of Australia
Children's Book of the Year Award	Nan Chauncy Award	James Moloney		
Indie Book Awards Book of the Year	Children's	Karen Foxlee	Lenny's Book of Everything	Allen & Unwin
Indie Book Awards Book of the Year	Young Adult	Barry Jonsberg	A Song Only I Can Hear	Allen & Unwin
New South Wales Premier's Literary Awards	Children's	Lorraine Marwood (joint winner)	Leave Taking	University of Queensland Press
New South Wales Premier's Literary Awards	Children's	Claire Saxby and Tannya Harricks (joint winner)	Dingo	Walker Books
New South Wales Premier's Literary Awards	Young People's	Erin Gough	Amelia Westlake	Hardie Grant Egmont
Victorian Premier's Literary Awards	Young Adult Fiction	Ambelin Kwaymullina and Ezekiel Kwaymullina	Catching Teller Crow	Allen & Unwin

=== Crime and Mystery ===
==== National ====
Award	Category	Author	Title	Publisher
Davitt Award	Novel	Dervla McTiernan	The Rúin	HarperCollins
Davitt Award	Young adult novel	Sarah Epstein	Small Spaces	Walker Books
Davitt Award	Children's novel	Judith Rossell	Wakestone Hall	ABC Books
Davitt Award	True crime	Chloe Hooper	The Arsonist: A Mind on Fire	Penguin
Davitt Award	Debut novel	Bri Lee	Eggshell Skull	Allen & Unwin
Davitt Award	Readers' choice	Jane Harper	The Lost Man	Pan Macmillan
Ned Kelly Award	Novel	Jane Harper	The Lost Man	Pan Macmillan
Ned Kelly Award	First novel	Dervla McTiernan	The Rúin	HarperCollins
Ned Kelly Award	True crime	Bri Lee	Eggshell Skull	Allen & Unwin
Ned Kelly Award	Lifetime achievement	Bob Bottom		

=== Science fiction ===
Award	Category	Author	Title	Publisher
Ditmar Award	Novel	Sam Hawke	City of Lies	Tor Books
Ditmar Award	Best Novella or Novelette	Tansy Rayner Roberts	Cabaret of Monsters	self-published
Ditmar Award	Best Short Story	Kathleen Jennings	"The Heart of Owl Abbas"	Tor.com

=== Poetry ===
Award	Author	Title	Publisher
Adelaide Festival Awards for Literature	Not awarded		
Anne Elder Award	Eunice Andrada	Flood Damages	Giramondo
Mary Gilmore Award	Marjon Mossammaparast	That Sight	Cordite
Prime Minister's Literary Awards	Judith Beveridge	Sun Music: New and Selected Poems	Giramondo Publishing
New South Wales Premier's Literary Awards	Judith Bishop	Interval	University of Queensland Press
Queensland Literary Awards	Alison Whittaker	Blakwork	Magabala Books
Victorian Premier's Literary Awards	Kate Lilley	Tilt	Vagabond Press

=== Drama ===
Award	Category	Author	Title	Publisher
New South Wales Premier's Literary Awards	Script	Benjamin Gilmour	Jirga	Felix Media Pty Ltd
New South Wales Premier's Literary Awards	Play	Kendall Feaver	The Almighty Sometimes	Griffin Theatre
Patrick White Playwrights' Award	Award	Keziah Warner	LuNa	Victorian College of the Arts
Patrick White Playwrights' Award	Fellowship	Anchuli Felicia King		

=== Non-Fiction ===
Award	Category	Author	Title	Publisher
Adelaide Festival Awards for Literature	Non-Fiction	Not awarded		
Indie Book Awards Book of the Year	Non-Fiction	Chloe Hooper	The Arsonist	Random House Australia
Indie Book Awards Book of the Year	Illustrated Non-Fiction	Marcia Langton	Marcia Langton: Welcome to Country	Hardie Grant Travel
National Biography Award	Biography	Behrouz Boochani	No Friend But the Mountains: Writing from Manus Prison	Picador Australia
New South Wales Premier's Literary Awards	Non-Fiction	Billy Griffiths (joint winner)	Deep Time Dreaming: Uncovering Ancient Australia	Black Inc.
New South Wales Premier's Literary Awards	Non-Fiction	Sarah Krasnostein (joint winner)	The Trauma Cleaner: One Woman’s Extraordinary Life in Death, Decay & Disaster	Text Publishing
New South Wales Premier's History Awards	Australian History	Meredith Lake	The Bible in Australia: A Cultural History	NewSouth Books
New South Wales Premier's History Awards	Community and Regional History	Sarah Luke	Callan Park, Hospital for the Insane	Australian Scholarly Publishing
New South Wales Premier's History Awards	General History	Christina Thompson	Sea People: The Puzzle of Polynesia	Harper
Queensland Literary Awards	Non-Fiction	Mary Hoban	An Unconventional Wife: The Life of Julia Sorell Arnold	Scribe
Victorian Premier's Literary Awards	Non-Fiction	Behrouz Boochani	No Friend But the Mountains: Writing from Manus Prison	Picador Australia

== Deaths ==
- 20 January – Mudrooroo, novelist, poet and playwright (pen name of Colin Thomas Johnson)(born 1938)
- 1 February – Andrew McGahan, novelist (born 1966)
- 4 March – Les Carlyon, newspaper editor and nonfiction writer (born 1942)
- 13 March – Edmund Capon, art historian (died in London)(born 1940 in London)
- 15 March – Rudi Krausmann, playwright and poet (born 1933 in Austria)
- 22 March – Jack Absalom, artist, author and adventurer (born 1927)
- 29 April – Les Murray, poet, anthologist and critic (born 1938)
- 19 May – John Millett, poet, reviewer and poetry editor (born 1921)
- 1 June – Christobel Mattingley, writer for children and young adults (born 1931)
- 13 July – Kerry Reed-Gilbert, poet and author (born 1956)
- 21 July –
  - Laurie Hergenhan, literary scholar (born 1931)
  - Ann Moyal, historian of science (born 1926)
- 10 September – Hal Colebatch, poet and novelist (born 1945)
- 30 October – Beatrice Faust, co-founder of Women's Electoral Lobby, journalist and author (born 1939)
- 24 November – Clive James, poet, novelist and critic (died in Cambridge, England)(born 1939)

== See also ==
- 2019 in Australia
- 2019 in literature
- 2019 in poetry
- List of years in Australian literature
- List of years in literature
- List of Australian literary awards
