= Blood Redemption =

2002 crime novel by Australian author Alex Palmer

- Author: Alex Palmer
- Language: English
- Series: Paul Harrigan and Grace Riordan
- Genre: Crime novel
- Publisher: HarperCollins
- Publication date: 2002
- Publication place: Australia
- Media type: Print
- Pages: 369 pp.
- Awards: 2003 Davitt Award, Best Adult Novel, co-winner; 2003 Ned Kelly Award, Best First Novel, winner
- ISBN: 0732271304
- Preceded by: -
- Followed by: The Tattooed Man

Blood Redemption is a 2002 crime novel by Australian author Alex Palmer.

It is the first novel in the author's "Paul Harrigan and Grace Riordan" series.

It was the co-winner of the Davitt Award for Best Adult Novel in 2003.

== Synopsis ==
A doctor and his wife are shot and killed on a Sydney backstreet in front of their son. The young woman who committed the crime fled the scene, leaving behind the murder weapon. Detective Inspector Paul Harrigan and Detective Constable Grace Riordan carry out the investigation. Was the murder just a random act of violence, or is it associated with the abortion clinic where the doctor worked?

== Critical reception ==
In a review in The Canberra Times Jeff Popple found that "Blood Redemption is a complex book that alternates between the police investigation and the killer's thoughts and actions as she plans the next act in her retribution against those who have betrayed her. Palmer writes well and is not afraid to tackle controversial issues, such as abortion and the effect of child abuse on its victims and society at large, as she explores the reasons behind the murder." He went on to state that "complaints with this ambitious novel are few" and that Alex Palmer is "an author to watch out for."

== Awards ==
- 2003 Davitt Award for Best Adult Novel, winner
- 2003 Ned Kelly Award for Best First Novel, winner

== See also ==
- 2002 in Australian literature

== Notes ==
- Dedication: For Ches
- Epigraph: So ye shall not pollute the land wherein ye are: for blood it defileth the land: and the land cannot be cleansed of the blood that is shed therein, but by the blood of him that shed it. : Numbers 35:33
