= Baby Did a Bad Bad Thing (novel) =

2002 crime novel by Australian author Gabrielle Lord

- Author: Gabrielle Lord
- Language: English
- Series: Gemma Lincoln P.I.
- Genre: Crime novel
- Publisher: Hodder Headline
- Publication date: 2002
- Publication place: Australia
- Media type: Print
- Pages: 361 pp.
- Awards: 2003 Davitt Award, Best Adult Novel, winner
- ISBN: 0340824387
- Preceded by: Feeding the Demons
- Followed by: Spiking the Girl

Baby Did a Bad Bad Thing is a 2002 crime novel by Australian author Gabrielle Lord.

It is the second novel in the author's "Gemma Lincoln P.I." series following Feeding the Demons which was published in 1999.

It was the winner of the Davitt Award for Best Adult Novel in 2003.

== Synopsis ==
Millionaire Benjamin Glass is missing and Gemma Lincoln is engaged to try to track him down. At the same time she is being stalked by an Internet hacker, and she has also taken on the case of identifying a serial killer who is preying on sex workers.

== Critical reception ==
In The Sydney Morning Herald Hugh Dillon attempted to put the novel into perspective: "Lord already is a crime writer with a formidable reputation and she pays respect to the genre's traditions. The great crime-writers (Chandler, Leonard, Higgins, Burke, Paretsky, to name a few) create a strong sense of place and Lord gives us a view of the dark side of Sydney."

Writing in Australian Book Review R. J. Thompson commented: "This is a big, busy novel. It may be more than one novel: unlike most crime books, it cannot be adequately summarised on the back cover."

== Awards ==
- 2003 Davitt Award for Best Adult Novel, winner
- 2003 Ned Kelly Award for Best Novel, shortlisted

== Notes ==
- Dedication: To Margie

== See also ==
- 2002 in Australian literature
