= Nita Prose =

Canadian author and book editor

Nita Pronovost, better known by her pen name Nita Prose, is a Canadian author and book editor. She is best known for her 2022 novel The Maid, which won an Anthony Award (2023), Barry Award (2023), Goodreads Choice Award (2022), Macavity Award (2023), and Ned Kelly Award (2022).

Prose began her career writing for literary magazines before becoming a production editor with HarperCollins Canada. She eventually transferred to Doubleday, where she served as senior editor. In 2016, she began overseeing the editorial team at Simon & Schuster Canada, ultimately becoming vice president and editorial director. As editor, she also worked as a ghost writer for multiple celebrity memoirs.

As of 2022, Prose lived in Toronto.

== Awards ==
The Maid was a number one New York Times Best Seller and a Good Morning America Book Club Pick. CrimeReads included it on their list of the best traditional mysteries of 2022. The same year, it was the eighth most-popular book club pick.

Awards for Prose's writing
Year	Title	Award	Result	Ref.
2022	The Maid	Fingerprint Award for Debut Novel of the Year	Finalist	
2022	The Maid	Goodreads Choice Award for Best Mystery & Thriller	Won	
2022	The Maid	Goodreads Choice Award for Best Debut Novel	Nominated	
2022	The Maid	Ned Kelly Award for Best International Crime Novel	Won	
2023	The Maid	Anthony Award for Best First Novel	Won	
2023	The Maid	Audie Award for Mystery	Finalist	
2023	The Maid	Barry Award for Best Debut Novel	Won	
2023	The Maid	Edgar Allan Poe Award for Best Novel	Finalist	
2023	The Maid	Macavity Award for Best First Mystery	Won	
2024	The Mystery Guest	Crime Writers of Canada Award for Best Traditional Mystery	Won	

== Publications ==
=== Molly the Maid series ===
1. The Maid. Ballantine Books. 2022. ISBN 9780593356159.
2. The Mystery Guest. Ballantine Books. 2023. ISBN 9780593356180.
3. The Mistletoe Mystery: A Maid Novella. Ballantine Books. 2024. ISBN 9780593875445.
4. The Maid's Secret. Ballantine Books. 2025. ISBN 9780593875414.
