= The Creeper (novel) =

2024 crime novel by Australian author Margaret Hickey

- Author: Margaret Hickey
- Language: English
- Genre: Crime novel
- Publisher: Random House Australia
- Publication date: July 2024
- Publication place: Australia
- Media type: Print
- Pages: 368
- Awards: 2025 Ned Kelly Award, Best Novel, winner
- ISBN: 9781761342028

The Creeper is a 2024 crime novel by Australian author Margaret Hickey.

It was the winner of the Best Novel Ned Kelly Award in 2025.

== Synopsis ==
Sally White is the new Senior Constable in Edenville, a small town in the Victorian High Country. As the town prepares a memorial for the tenth anniversary of a mass shooting in which six people were killed (five bushwalkers and the alleged killer) White is tasked by her superiors to become familiar with the case in order to answer any media questions. As she interviews relatives of the alleged killer and the victims she begins to realise some aspects of the original investigation may not have been handled correctly, leaving a number of important questions unanswered.

== Critical reception ==
A review in Better Reading magazine called this novel a "dark, Aussie thriller." They warned the reader to "be prepared to be completely enthralled by the mystery itself and the infamous Durant family. Once Sally starts travelling down the road-of-no-return, the twists come quickly, one after the other, making it enjoyable to see who's really behind everything."

The Sydney Arts Guide website labelled the novel "A gripping, excellently written page turner with lots of unexpected twists and turns."

== Awards ==
- 2025 Ned Kelly Award Best Novel, winner
- 2025 Davitt Award, Best Adult Novel, longlisted

== See also ==
- 2024 in Australian literature
