= Pig Boy =

Book by J. C. Burke

- Author: J. C. Burke
- Language: English
- Genre: Crime novel
- Publisher: Random House, Australia
- Publication date: 2011
- Publication place: Australia
- Media type: Print (Paperback)
- Pages: 322
- ISBN: 9781741663129
- Preceded by: Ocean Pearl

Pig Boy (2011) is a crime novel by Australian author J. C. Burke. It won the 2012 Ned Kelly Award.

== Plot summary ==
Damon Styles is expelled from school on his eighteenth birthday. He gets himself a firearms licence and intends to get a job shooting pigs with Pigman. But Damon harbours secrets and the citizens of the town of Strathven believe they know what Damon is planning and set out to stop him.

== Reviews ==
Holly Harper for Readings hadn't "been this impressed with a main character in quite some time" and thought the author "has created an absolutely unforgettable cast of characters".

== Awards and nominations ==
- 2011 longlisted Inky Awards — Gold Inky
- 2012 winner Ned Kelly Award — Best Novel
- 2012 shortlisted Davitt Award — Best Young Adult Book
