= Chris Whitaker (author) =

British author

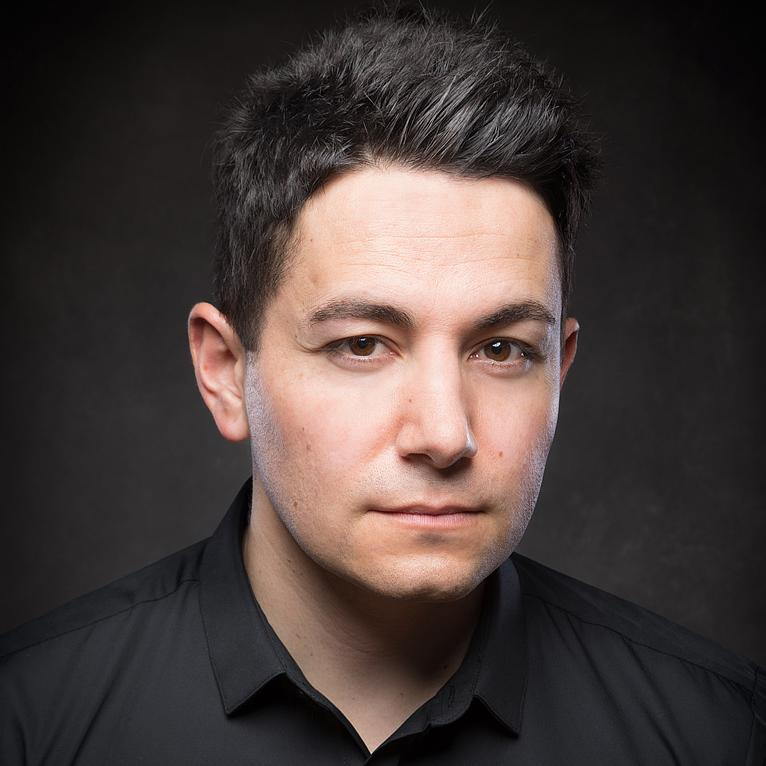
Chris Whitaker

Chris Whitaker is a British author known for his books Tall Oaks, All the Wicked Girls, We Begin at the End, and The Forevers.

His debut novel, Tall Oaks, won the CWA John Creasey New Blood Dagger Award in 2017. We Begin at the End became a New York Times bestseller and received multiple awards, including the #1 Indie Next Pick, a Waterstones Thriller of the Month, a Barnes & Noble Book Club Pick and a Good Morning America Buzz Pick. It also won the CWA Gold Dagger, the Theakston Crime Novel of the Year and the Ned Kelly Award in 2021. The book has also been translated into 28 languages.

In March 2021, it was announced that the rights to We Begin at the End had been acquired by Disney's 20th Television. Thomas Kail and Jennifer Todd were to develop the book for the Disney-owned studio.

In June 2023, it was announced that Orion Publishing Group had acquired two books from Whitaker. The first novel, All the Colours of the Dark, was published in 2024 by Orion Fiction. The US edition was published by Henry Holt.

In June 2024, a television series adaptation of All The Colors Of The Dark was announced with Universal Content Productions, Jenna Bush Hager's Thousand Voices & Sue Naegle's Dinner Party Productions producing the series and Sarah Gubbins writing and showrunning the series.

== Awards ==
=== Tall Oaks ===
- 2017: CWA New Blood Dagger

=== We Begin At The End ===
- 2021:
  - CWA Gold Dagger
  - Theakstons Crime Novel of the Year
  - Ned Kelly Award
- 2022:
  - Martin Beck Award

== Personal life ==
Before becoming an author, Whitaker worked as a trader. He was born and raised in London, and now lives in Hertfordshire with his wife and three children. He also worked part-time at Bishop's Stortford Library.

== Bibliography ==
- 2016: Tall Oaks, Twenty7, ISBN 1785770306
- 2017: All the Wicked Girls, Zaffre, ISBN 1785761528
- 2020: We Begin at the End, Zaffre, ISBN 1785769405
- 2021: The Forevers, Hot Key Books, ISBN 1471409619
- 2024: All the Colours of the Dark, Crown, ISBN 0593798872
