= The Story of Tom Brennan =

2005 Australian young adult novel by J. C. Burke

- Author: J.C Burke
- Language: English
- Genre: Young adult fiction
- Publisher: Random House Australia
- Publication date: 2005
- Publication place: Australia
- Pages: 284
- ISBN: 978-1-74166-092-0

The Story of Tom Brennan is a 2005 Australian young adult novel written by J. C. Burke. It was named as book of the year for older readers by the Children's Book Council of Australia. The story follows Tom Brennan, a 17-year-old boy known for his football skills. An accident involving his brother forces the family to move towns, and the novel shows the various Brennan family members changing after the accident and how it affected them.

The story involves issues relevant to teenagers such as alcohol, relationships and fitting in. This novel is often studied in Australian high schools as it is accessible to most readers.

== Plot ==
For Tom Brennan, life is about rugby, mates, and family—until a night of celebration changes his life forever. Tom's world explodes as his brother Daniel is sent to jail and the Brennans are forced to leave the small town Tom's lived in his whole life. Tom is a survivor but needs a ticket out of the past just as much as Daniel.

The novel is based around the aftermath of the incident that leads to the Brennan family leaving the town of Mumbilli and is written from Tom's perspective. Beginning in the present, Tom is at his grandmother's house and hating every minute of his new life, we soon begin to see glimpses of the events in Tom's recent past: the "sudden death" football party where all the trouble begins, and the terrible, tragic events of that night and days that follow. The novel involves teenage issues such as alcohol, drink driving, relationships, and moving on after your world turns upside down.

In the end, Tom becomes friends with a girl named Chrissy, which they progress from a friendship into a relationship. Chrissy and others help Tom come to terms with what happened in the past and have a positive outlook on the future.

== Characters (main) ==
- Tom Brennan—Narrator
- Daniel Brennan—Tom's Brother
- Brendan Brennan—Tom's Uncle
- Christina "Chrissy" Tulake —Tom's love interest, later girlfriend
- Theresa "Tess" Brennan —Tom's mother
- Joeseph Brennan —Tom's father
- Kylie Brennan —Tom's sister
- Carmen Healy —Tom's Grandmother
- Aunty Kath —Fin's mother
- Finbar "Fin" —Tom's cousin

== Awards ==
The Story of Tom Brennan has been awarded the 2006 CBC Book of the Year for Older Readers and the 2006 Australian Family Therapists Award for Children's Literature. The book is on the Australian's HSC syllabus list and is studied by high-schoolers in Australia.
