= Before It Breaks =

Book by Dave Warner

- Author: Dave Warner
- Language: English
- Genre: Crime fiction
- Publisher: Fremantle Press
- Publication date: 2015
- Publication place: Australia
- Media type: Print
- Pages: 337 pp
- ISBN: 9781925161205
- Preceded by: Murder in the Off-Season
- Followed by: Clear to the Horizon

Before It Breaks (2015) is a police procedural novel by Australian writer Dave Warner. It was the first novel to feature the author's recurring character, Detective Daniel Clement. It won the Ned Kelly Award for Best Novel in 2016.

== Plot summary ==
Detective Inspector Daniel Clement has left the homicide squad in Perth, Western Australia, to return to Broome, the town where he grew up. He and his wife have separated and Clement wants to be near his daughter. His police work is a long series of petty theft and drunken violence incidents until a body is discovered by Jasper's Creek with an axe wound to the head. Clement is called upon for his homicide skills and takes control of the case, initially thinking it a simple case of opportunistic murder. But as he digs deeper into the victim's background, and after a second body is found with the same type of head wound he and the Broome police come to the conclusion that there is something more sinister at play.

== Critical reception ==
Fiona Hardy, reviewing the novel for Readings, found the novel "a wild ride" and noted: "’70s punk-rocker Warner nails laconic Australian characters but has infused Before It Breaks with a sharp writing style. So immersive in its description of the outback that you could almost swat at the words on the page like the ever-present flies and use the pages to fan yourself from the heat, it bleeds casual realism, honest but never dreary, regarding the non-blockbuster limitations of technology on blurry pictures, office procedure and officers learning the ropes on their first murder, or the determination needed to traverse through hundreds of kilometres of searing West Australian space just to interview one person."

Ned Kelly Award judges' comments: "The eighth novel from songwriter Warner nails the brief: well-drawn characters you could swear you've met somewhere already, and an intriguing plot with roots in other places and other times, studded with incidents that ought to be bizarre but which Warner renders believable. What really raises this book above the pack, though, is a stunning sense of location: a depiction of Broome and its environment so vivid that you can practically taste it. Or, on occasion, run from it."

== Notes ==
- Dedication: For Nicole, shelter in the storm.

== See also ==
- 2015 in Australian literature
