= The Rules of Backyard Cricket =

2016 novel by Australian writer Jock Serong

- Author: Jock Serong
- Language: English
- Genre: Novel
- Publisher: Text Publishing
- Publication date: 2016
- Publication place: Australia
- Media type: Print
- Pages: 291 pp.
- ISBN: 9781925355215

The Rules of Backyard Cricket is a 2016 crime fiction novel by Australian author Jock Serong.

It was described as a "bestseller" on the Publishers Weekly website in October 2016.

== Synopsis ==
This is the story of two Australian brothers who start off playing cricket against each other in their backyard: Wally Keefe who ends up a professional cricketer; and Darren who ends up shot in the knee, bound and gagged in the boot of a car.

== Critical reception ==
Writing in Australian Book Review reviewer Craig Billingham noted: "Reminiscent of Malcolm Knox's A Private Man (2004), which also featured a professional cricketer, the subject under investigation in The Rules of Backyard Cricket is a recognisable variant of the Australian male: white, laconic, barrel-chested, hands shaped by long exposure to bats and balls and beer bottles."

In the Sydney Morning Herald Sue Turnbull called the novel "Beautifully written and acutely observed, The Rules of Backyard Cricket is a noir tour de force."

== Awards ==
- 2017 shortlisted Ned Kelly Awards — Best Crime Novel
- 2017 shortlisted Victorian Premier's Prize for Fiction
