= The Chase (Fox novel) =

Crime novel by Australian writer Candice Fox

- Author: Candice Fox
- Language: English
- Genre: Fiction
- Publisher: Bantam, Australia
- Publication date: 2021
- Publication place: Australia
- Media type: Print
- Pages: 432 pp
- ISBN: 9781760896799
- Preceded by: Gathering Dark
- Followed by: 2 Sisters Detective Agency

The Chase (2021) is a crime novel by Australian writer Candice Fox.

It won the 2022 Ned Kelly Award for Best Fiction, and was longlisted for the 2022 Davitt Award for Best Adult Crime Novel.

== Abstract ==
"When 650 of the world’s most violent human beings pour out from Pronghorn Correctional Facility into the Nevada Desert, the biggest manhunt in US history begins.

"But for John Kradle, this is his one chance to prove his innocence, twenty-six years after the murder of his wife and child.

"He just needs to stay one step ahead of the teams of law enforcement officers he knows will be chasing the escapees down.

"Death Row Supervisor turned fugitive-hunter Celine Osbourne is single-minded in her mission to catch Kradle. She has very personal reasons for hating him – and she knows exactly where he’s heading . . ." (Publication summary)

== Critical reception ==
Kate McIntosh, of the Readings website was impressed with the novel: "Roll Prison Break, Con Air and The Fugitive into one, put them in a book, add some seriously kick-ass female characters, and you have The Chase. Highly addictive, constantly surprising and with enough suspense to keep you guessing page after page, it is impossible not to admire Candice Fox’s crime writing skills. By the end of this book, she will make sure you never trust anyone again."

AB Endacott on "The Nerd Daily" website had some reservations: "Fox’s writing is competent and has the efficiency of someone who knows her craft (among the eleven books to her name are titles co-authored with James Patterson). The setting is well drawn, and the characters are engaging. Despite the fact that the various perspectives felt a bit redundant, I was also engaged by the mysteries and read on with the keenness of someone who really wants to know the answer."

== See also ==
- 2021 in Australian literature
