= Waiting for the Past =

2015 Australian poetry collection by Les Murray

- Author: Les Murray
- Language: English
- Genre: Poetry collection
- Publisher: Black Inc
- Publication date: April 2015
- Publication place: Australia
- Media type: Print
- Pages: 112 pp
- Awards: 2015 Queensland Literary Awards — Judith Wright Calanthe Award, winner; 2016 Adelaide Festival Awards for Literature – John Bray Poetry Award, winner
- ISBN: 9781863957137

Waiting for the Past is a collection of poems by Australian poet Les Murray, published by Black Inc in 2015.

The collection contains 64 poems reprinted from a number of literary journals and with some being published here for the first time.

== Contents ==
- "The Black Beaches"
- "Inspecting the Rivermouth"
- "The Canonisation"
- "High Rise"
- "Nuclear Family Bees"
- "When Two Percent Were Students"
- "I Wrote a Little Haiku"
- "Dynamic Rest"
- "West Coast Township"
- "Money and the Flying Horses"
- "Sun Taiko"
- "Persistence of the Reformation"
- "Child Logic"
- "Floodtime Night Shelter"
- "Powder of Light"
- "The Backroad Collections"
- "Tap Dogs Music"
- "English as a Second Language"
- "High Speed Trap Space"
- "Diabetica"
- "The Privacy of Typewriters"
- "All of Half Way"
- "Big Rabbit at the Verandah"
- "Being Spared the Inquests"
- "Time Twins"
- "The Plaster Eater"
- "The Glory and Decline of Bread"
- "Eating from the Dictionary"
- "O.K. Primavera Lips"
- "Order of Perception : West Kimberley"
- "The Mussel Bowl"
- "Growth"
- "A Denizen"
- "Radiant Pleats, Mulgoa"
- "Bird Signatures"
- "Last World Before the Stars"
- "1960 Brought the Electric"
- "Vertigo"
- "Holland's Nadir"
- "Dog Skills"
- "Raising an Only Child"
- "Clan-Sized Night Chanting"
- "Bread Again"
- "Bench Seats"
- "Grooming with Nail Clippers"
- "The Thirties"
- "Bollywood Videoi
- "Savoury"
- "Up to the Greek Club"
- "Self and Dream Self"
- "Beasts of the City"
- "Whale Sounding"
- "The Genghis Firmament"
- "The Massacre"
- "The Care"
- "High Foliage"
- "The Walk-Off in Newtown"
- "Jesus Was a Healer"
- "The Flute"
- "The Murders of Women"
- "Under the Lube Oil"
- "Winter Garden"
- "Goths in Leipzig"
- "Maryanne Bugg"

== Critical reception ==
In a review of the collection in Australian Book Review Stephen Edgar noted that "A number of the poems are striking evocations of the natural world, with or without a human presence." He went on to say of Murray that he "is a man of strong opinions, which appear in his poems from time to time, he also has negative capability, in spades, and is able to submit his consciousness to alien states and beings, inhabit them, and bring forth poems of startling originality in extraordinary language."

Sean O'Brien, for The Guardian newspaper, called the collection "transcendental". He went on to comment that "the world Murray renders is close at hand even for the remotest reader. It is completely lived in. It is handled, worked, scented, mapped, celebrated, lamented, and its people honoured in both presence and memory."

== Awards ==
- 2015 Queensland Literary Awards — Judith Wright Calanthe Award, winner
- 2016 Adelaide Festival Awards for Literature, winner
- 2016 Prime Minister's Literary Awards — Poetry, shortlisted

== Notes ==
- Dedication: To the glory of God

== See also ==
- 2015 in Australian literature
