= The Love of a Bad Man =

2016 Australian short story collection

- Author: Laura Elizabeth Woollett
- Language: English
- Genre: Historical fiction, Crime fiction
- Publisher: Scribe
- Publication date: 2016
- Publication place: Australia
- ISBN: 1925307786
- OCLC: 953367981

The Love of a Bad Man is a collection of short stories by Australian writer Laura Elizabeth Woollett. It contains 12 stories, each revolving around a historical woman or group of women intimately involved with a criminal.

== Reception ==
Cameron Woodhead of The Sydney Morning Herald wrote that the collection "often speaks from inside the criminal mind, and Woollett's pitch-perfect command of narrative voice, period, and psychology creates 12 tales to fascinate and unnerve." Sarah Chandler of Fairfax New Zealand opined: "While skilfully written and quite richly imagined, The Love of a Bad Man is essentially some kind of history-porn." Sam Cooney of The Weekend Australian was more critical, writing that there is a "lack of depth and intensity" and a "lack of complexity" to the stories, and that the appendix, which gives a brief factual overview of the lives of each of the women, is "often the most affecting part of their stories."

== Awards ==
- 2017 Ned Kelly Awards — Best First Novel, shortlisted
- 2017 Davitt Award — Best Adult Crime Novel, longlisted
- 2017 Victorian Premier's Literary Awards — Prize for Fiction, shortlisted
