= Police at the Station and They Don't Look Friendly =

2017 novel by Adrian McKinty

- Author: Adrian McKinty
- Language: English
- Genre: Novel
- Publisher: Serpent's Tail
- Publication date: 6 July 2017
- Publication place: Australia
- Media type: Print
- Pages: 320 pp.
- Awards: 2017 Ned Kelly Awards — Best Novel, winner
- ISBN: 9781781256930

Police at the Station and They Don't Look Friendly is a 2017 novel by the Northern Irish author Adrian McKinty. It is the sixth novel in the author's Sean Duffy series.

It was the winner of the 2017 Ned Kelly Award for Best Novel.

== Synopsis ==
In Belfast in 1988 a small-time heroin dealer has been murdered with a crossbow in front of his house. Detective Sean Duffy begins to investigate while being himself under the scrutiny of Internal Affairs. The murder seems like a simple criminal act within the drug scene but is it related to The Troubles or just a natural outcome of the lawlessness of the times.

== Notes ==
- The title is taken from a line in the Tom Waits song "Cold Water".

== Critical reception ==
In The Newtown Review of Books reviewer Karen Chisholm called the novel "required crime fiction reading," and noted that it "combines personal and professional, good and bad, past and present, in equal measure."

Kirkus Reviews commented that "McKinty's hero is irreverent, charming, and mordantly, laugh-out-loud funny, and his eclectic personal soundtrack and bitter, pragmatic politics make for vivid period detail."

== Awards ==
- 2017 Ned Kelly Award for Best Novel, winner
- 2017 CWA Ian Fleming Steel Dagger, longlisted

== Publishing history ==
After the novel's initial publication in the UK by Serpent's Tail, it was reprinted as follows:

- Seventh Street Books, USA, 2017
- Suhrkamp, Germany, 2018 (under the title Dirty Cops)
- Blackstone Publishing, USA, 2019

== See also ==
- 2017 in Australian literature
