= The Wife and the Widow =

2019 novel by Australian author Christian White

- Author: Christian White
- Language: English
- Genre: Crime novel
- Publisher: Affirm Press
- Publication date: September 2019
- Publication place: Australia
- Media type: Print
- Pages: 320 pp.
- Awards: 2020 Ned Kelly Award for Best Novel, winner
- ISBN: 9781925712858

The Wife and the Widow is a 2019 crime novel by the Australian author Christian White.

It was the winner of the 2020 Ned Kelly Award for Best Novel.

== Summary ==
Most of the action of this Australian crime novel occurs on the fictional Victorian island of Belport which lies a short ferry ride off the coast of the Bellarine Peninsula. As the novel's title suggests it follows two main story threads: one concerning the widow, Kate Keddie, and the other the wife, Abby Gilpin.

Kate's husband John fails to return to Melbourne from a London medical conference. During the fortnight that he has been away he has kept in contact with his Australian family via Skype. As the days progress Kate comes to realise that her husband has left his job in a palliative care clinic, and, most likely, hasn’t been in London at any sort of conference at all. A missing-person report is lodged with the local police and Kate receives an alarm from a security firm monitoring her holiday home on the island. John's body is found and the investigation into his murder will come to dominate Kate's life.

In the novel's other thread Abby’s husband Ray runs a small handyman business maintaining holiday homes on Belport island and also supplements his income by doing odd-jobs for the island's permanent residents. When a body is discovered, Abby starts to suspect her husband of the murder.

== Notes ==
- Dedication: For Sum

== Critical reception ==
Writing for The Australian Book Review David Whish-Wilson noted that the novel was as much about characterisation as it was about its intricate plotting: "While it is the highly inventive plot that will stay with many readers, as White masterfully manipulates the novel's structure to draw the two main storylines together, it is his characterisation that really elevates this novel and amplifies the emotionally powerful ending."

== Awards ==
- 2020 winner Ned Kelly Award for Crime Writing — Best Novel
- 2020 shortlisted Booksellers Choice Award Book People Book of the Year — Adult Fiction Book of the Year
- 2020 longlisted Australian Book Industry Awards (ABIA) — Australian General Fiction Book of the Year
- 2020 shortlisted Indie Awards — Fiction

== Publishing history ==
After the novel's initial publication by Affirm Press in 2019 it was republished as follows:

- Minotaur Books, USA, 2020 and 2021

== See also ==
- 2019 in Australian literature
