= Quota (novel) =

2014 crime novel by Australian writer Jock Serong

- Author: Jock Serong
- Language: English
- Genre: Crime
- Publisher: Text Publishing
- Publication date: 28 May 2014
- Publication place: Australia
- Media type: Print
- Pages: 251 pp.
- Awards: Ned Kelly Award Best First Novel, 2015
- ISBN: 9781922148933
- Preceded by: -
- Followed by: The Rules of Backyard Cricket

Quota (2014) is a crime novel by Australian writer Jock Serong. It was originally published by Text Publishing in Australia in 2014.

== Synopsis ==
Charlie Jardim's career as a criminal lawyer in Melbourne is in trouble after a major outburst in court. In order to leave this behind him he accepts a prosecution brief from a friend for a case in the remote Victorian town of Dauphin. The victim, Matthew Lanegan, was caught up in the illegal abalone trade, and as Jardim digs into the case he sees the town close up against him.

== Publishing history ==
After its initial publication in Australia by Text Publishing in 2014, the novel was reprinted by Text in 2016.

The novel was also translated into German in 2018.

== Critical reception ==
Carody Culber, for Kill Your Darlings noted: "Of course, there's nothing new about the tropes of small-town secrets and witnesses who don't talk, but Serong uses a pretty classic crime set-up to create a deft exploration of community politics and how they intersect with family loyalties and the law. Quota has some striking scenes that are delivered with an assured combination of droll wit and elegant prose: physically as well as emotionally displaced, Charlie sees Dauphin as a 'land arranged in a code he couldn't decipher. He had left the language of his world behind and this place would offer him no translation, merely reflecting his troubles blankly back at him'."

== Awards ==
- Ned Kelly Award Best First Novel, 2015 winner

== See also ==
- 2014 in Australian literature
