= The Dark Days Club =

2015 historical novel by Alison Goodman

First edition (publ, HarperCollins)

The Dark Days Club is a historical fiction novel by Alison Goodman. It was published by HarperCollins in December 2015 in Australia, and in the UK and US in January 2016. The book is first of the Lady Helen series. The story is set in early nineteenth-century London. The series is a Regency romance.

== Characters ==
- Lady Helen
