= Mark Dapin =

Australian journalist

- Born: 1963 (age 62–63); United Kingdom
- Occupations: Journalist; author; historian; screenwriter

Academic background
- Education: University of New South Wales (PhD) University of Warwick (BA [Hons]) University of Technology Sydney (MA) Griffith University Queensland (BGS)
- Thesis: Myth Making and Memory: Australia, the Vietnam War and National Service (2018)
- Doctoral advisor: Jeffrey Grey

Academic work
- Notable works: Australia's Vietnam: Myth vs History (2019)
- Website: http://markdapin.com

Mark Dapin (born 1963) is an Australian journalist, author, historian and screenwriter. He is best known for his long-running column in Good Weekend magazine.

== Early life ==
Mark Dapin was born in Britain and migrated to Australia in 1989.

== Career ==
Dapin was the founding chief sub-editor of the Australian Financial Review Magazine in 1995. From 1998 to 2002, he was editor and then editor-in-chief of Ralph magazine. He has written for a variety of publications including The Sydney Morning Herald, The Guardian, The Times, Penthouse and Good Weekend. He has a Bachelor of Social Science degree and a Masters in Journalism from UTS and has taught journalism courses at the University of Sydney and Macleay College.

In 2008, Dapin was thrown out of celebrity chef Gordon Ramsay’s home when he was only minutes into a profile interview for Good Weekend magazine. The incident – and subsequent attempts by Ramsay’s publicists to control the story – formed the basis of Dapin’s feature ‘Nightmare on Ramsay Street’ and a later essay for the literary magazine Meanjin. Dapin’s work on Ramsay was examined in two essays in The Profiling Handbook: "What's the Point of a Profile? The Curious Cases of Mark Dapin on Gordon Ramsay and Jack Marx on Russell Crowe" by Fiona Giles, and "Double Vision: Profile of a Profile" by Gillian Rennie. Rennie, a lecturer at Rhodes University, South Africa, uses Dapin’s thoughts on the Ramsay interview as a prism for her own reflections on her famous profile of Epainette Mbeki. Giles, a professor at Sydney University, examines Dapin's work alongside that of his contemporary, Jack Marx. She writes: "both journalists are well-known, mid-career writers bringing a gonzo, rock 'n' roll sensibility to their work. Well-versed in the post-New Journalism style, they include themselves in their stories, and are entertainingly provocative. They enjoy a high status in Australia as award-winning writers, are known to court controversy, and have been sacked from Australia’s second largest print empire, Fairfax Media – occasions which attracted media coverage. They are both authors of book-length literary journalism in addition to feature-length profiles, and are admired for being independent thinkers with a quick wit."

Dapin’s departure in 2012 from Fairfax Media (to which he subsequently returned as a contributor) and the loss of his Good Weekend column, were reported extensively in the Australian press.(subscription required) In recent years, he has become more prominent as a novelist and historian. In July 2014 he was commissioned by the Centenary of Anzac Jewish Program to write a military history book Jewish Anzacs, published by the Sydney Jewish Museum. In July 2017 he was named as one of the screenwriters on the second season of TV show Wolf Creek – he is credited on two episodes of the show.

In 2019, he presented Myths of War on ABC radio.

== Interviews ==
- The Sydney Morning Herald - "Mark Dapin, author of R&R, finds children and fiction are all that matters" by Susan Chenery

== Awards and nominations ==
- 2010, Ned Kelly Awards, best first fiction, winner, King of the Cross
- 2012, Miles Franklin Award, longlist, Spirit House
- 2012, Age Book of the Year, shortlist, Spirit House
- 2014, Royal Society of Literature’s Ondaatje Prize, shortlist, Spirit House
- 2015, 'The Nib': CAL Waverley Library Award for Literature — Alex Buzo Shortlist Prize, winner, The Nashos' War
- 2015, 'The Nib': CAL Waverley Library Award for Literature — People's Choice Award, winner, The Nashos' War
- 2016, New South Wales Premier's Literary Awards — Douglas Stewart Prize for Non-fiction, shortlist, The Nashos' War
- 2016, Ned Kelly Awards, best crime novel, shortlist, R&R
- 2017, Mark and Evette Moran Nib Literary Award Military History Prize 2017, shortlisted, Jewish Anzacs
- 2019, Nib Military History Prize, finalist, Australia's Vietnam

== Bibliography ==
=== Books ===
- Fridge Magnets are Bastards (2007) ISBN 978-0-7322-8521-0
- Strange Country (2008) ISBN 978-1-4050-3872-0
- King of the Cross (2009) ISBN 978-1-4050-3962-8
- Spirit House (2011) ISBN 978-1-4050-4018-1
- The Penguin Book of Australian War Writing (2011) ISBN 978-0-6700-7552-2
- From the Trenches: The best ANZAC writing of World War One (2013) ISBN 978-0-6700-7781-6
- The Nashos' War: Australia's national servicemen and Vietnam (2014) ISBN 978-0-6700-7705-2
- R&R (2015) ISBN 978-0-6700-7820-2
- Jewish Anzacs: Jews in the Australian Military (2017) ISBN 978-1-7422-3535-6
- Australia's Vietnam: Myth vs History (2019) ISBN 978-1-7422-3636-0
- Public Enemies (2020) Allen and Unwin ISBN 9781760295356
- Carnage: A succulent Chinese meal, Mr Rent-a-Kill and the Australian Manson murders (2023) Scribner ISBN 9781761108099
- Sex & Money: How I lived, breathed, read, wrote, loved, hated, dreamed and drank men's magazines (2004) ISBN 978-1-7411-4320-1

=== Short stories ===
- Dapin, Mark (1993). "My Grandmother's House". Meanjin. 52 (3): 465–476.
- Dapin, Mark (1997). "Queer". Enter...: HQ/Flamingo Short Story Collection: 95–106.
- Dapin, Mark (2008). "The Face of 1970". Meanjin. 67 (3): 140–145.
- Dapin, Mark (2010). "Visitors' Day". The Best Australian Stories 2011: 148–155.
- Dapin, Mark (2018/19). "In the Court of the Lion King". Sydney Noir. ISBN 978-1-6177-5581-1, 978-1-9255-8943-6

=== Memoir ===
- Dapin, Mark (2008). "The Last Jews in Harehills". Meanjin. 67 (2): 46–89.
- Dapin, Mark (2012). "Confessions of a Columnist". Meanjin. 68 (1).

=== Essays and reporting ===
- Dapin, Mark (1998). "From Russia with Gloves". The Best Australian Sports Writing & Photography: 37–44.
- Dapin, Mark (2006). "1999 Betrayed (1999)". Best Foot Forward: 30 Years of Australian Travel Writing: 187–192.
- Dapin, Mark (2008). "Adventures in LA-Land". The Best Australian Humorous Writing: 69–80.
- Dapin, Mark (2009). "Good to see you. Let me see you out". Meanjin. 68 (2): 79–90.
- Dapin, Mark (2010). "Ten Myths of Australian Crime". The Best Australian Essays 2010: 43–54.
- Dapin, Mark (2012). "Travelling as a Journalist". Small World: Postcards and Intelligence from Everywhere. Griffith Review. 37 (Spring): 93–105.
- Dapin, Mark (2014). "Try getting out more". Backburn. Australian Author. 46 (1): 18–19.
- Dapin, Mark (2017). "'We too were Anzacs': Were Vietnam Veterans ever truly excluded from the Anzac tradition?". The Honest History Book: 77–91.
