= Transcension (novel) =

2002 novel by Damien Broderick

- Transcension first edition cover
- Author: Damien Broderick
- Cover artist: David Seeley
- Language: English
- Genre: Science fiction
- Publisher: Tor Books
- Publication date: 19 February 2002
- Publication place: United States
- Media type: Print (Hardback & Paperback)
- Pages: 432 (first edition)
- ISBN: 978-0-7653-0369-1

Transcension is a 2002 science fiction novel by Damien Broderick. It follows the story of lawyer Mohammed Kasim Abdel-Malik, whose body is placed in cryonic suspension and his mind used as a source for the artificial intelligence Aleph after he is killed.

== Background ==
Transcension was first published in the United States on 19 February 2002 by Tor Books in hardback format. In March 2003 it was republished in paperback format. Transcension won the 2002 Aurealis Award for best science fiction novel and was a short-list nominee for the 2003 Ditmar Award for best Australian novel but lost to Sean Williams' and Shane Dix's Echoes of Earth.
