= Bunty Avieson =

Australian writer

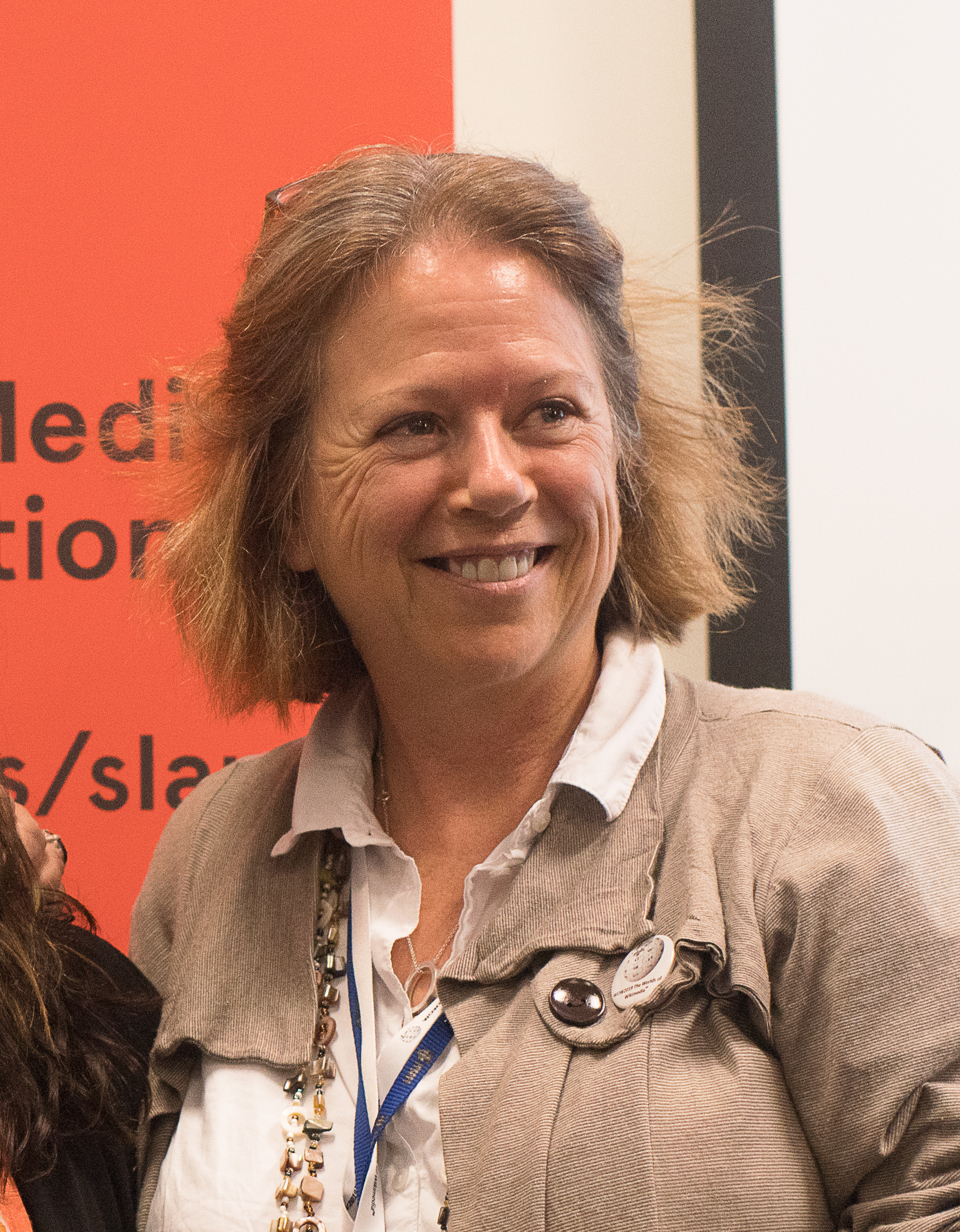
- Avieson in 2019
- Education: Macquarie University
- Scientific career
- Workplaces: University of Sydney
- Thesis: The voice of the dragon: The emerging media in the new democracy of Bhutan (2013)

Carolyn "Bunty" Avieson is an Australian journalist, feature writer, novelist and academic.

== Career ==
Avieson has a PhD and a Master of Philosophy from Macquarie University, as well as an Associate Diploma of Journalism from RMIT University. In 2008–2009 she worked as a media consultant to newspaper Bhutan Observer, partly funded by the United Nations Development Program and was a consultant to Journalists Without Borders, Asia Pacific Desk.

Avieson has published three novels, a novella and travel memoir; and been translated into Japanese, German and Thai. She is the recipient of two Ned Kelly Awards. In the 1990s she was editorial director of mass market women's magazines Woman's Day and New Idea. She is a senior lecturer in journalism and media at the University of Sydney.

Avieson served on the Wikimedia Australia Board from August 2021 to September 2025. In 2023, she taught a group of nuns in Bhutan how to edit Wikipedia so they could create and improve articles about their own country.

== Awards ==
- 2002 – Ned Kelly Awards – winner of the Best First Novel and Reader's Vote, for Apartment 255
- 2003 – Davitt Awards – Best Novel, shortlisted for The Affair
- 2004 – Ned Kelly Awards – Best Novel, shortlisted for The Wrong Door

== Bibliography ==
=== Novels ===
- Apartment 255 (2002)
- The Affair (2003) Review
- The Wrong Door (2004) Review
- Once You Know (2005)

=== Travel writing ===
- Baby in a Backpack Through Bhutan (2004) Review
- The Dragon Finds Its Voice (2013)

=== Documentary writing ===
- A Story from Bhutan: The Making of "Travellers & Magicians" (2004)

== Personal life ==
Avieson's partner is the film producer Mal Watson, who made The Cup and Travellers & Magicians, with writer/director Khyentse Norbu. Avieson and Watson have a daughter, Kathryn, who was the baby in the travel book Baby in a Backpack to Bhutan. They live in Sydney. Avieson's father was the late Associate Professor John Avieson, one of Australia's first journalism academics, who authored several books, including Applied Journalism in Australia and Editing Australian Newspapers.
