= Eden (Fox novel) =

Book by Candice Fox

- First edition
- Author: Candice Fox
- Language: English
- Series: Eden Archer
- Genre: novel
- Publisher: Random House, Australia
- Publication date: 2014
- Publication place: Australia
- English publication date: 1 December 2014
- Media type: Print (Paperback)
- Pages: 432
- ISBN: 9780857982568
- Preceded by: Hades
- Followed by: Fall

Eden (2014) is a crime novel by Australian author Candice Fox. It won the Ned Kelly Award in 2015 for Best Novel.

The novel follows Eden Archer, a policewoman and serial killer who is on the trail of a killer targeting prostitutes.

== Reviews ==
Sue Turnbull from The Sydney Morning Herald stated: "This is crime fiction informed not so much by the literary past of the genre, as by television's Dexter and Breaking Bad, the ironically violent films of Quentin Tarantino and the graphic novels of Frank Miller."

== Awards and nominations ==
- 2015 longlisted Davitt Award — Best Adult Crime Novel
- 2015 winner Ned Kelly Awards — Best Novel

== See also ==
- 2014 in Australian literature
