= Duncan McNab =

Australian Catholic missionary (1820–1896)

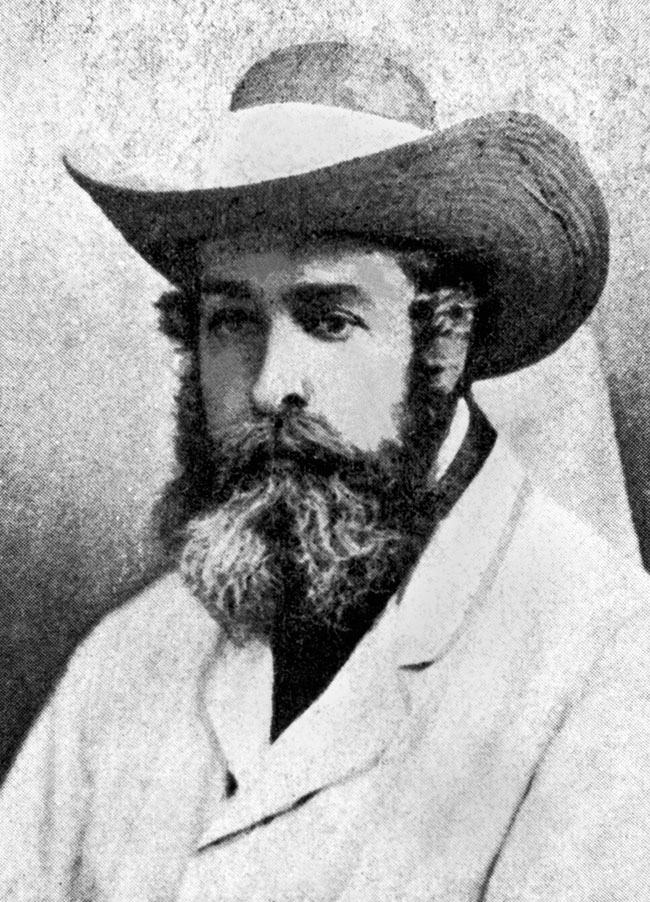
- McNab as he appeared about 1870
- Born: 11 May 1820; Achrinich, parish of Morven, Argyll, Scotland
- Died: 19 September 1896 (aged 76); Richmond, Melbourne, Victoria, Australia
- Occupation: Catholic Missionary
- Known for: Campaigning for equal rights for Australian Aboriginal peoples

Duncan McNab (1820–1896), was a Catholic missionary in Queensland and the Kimberley region of Western Australia.

McNab was born on 11 May 1820 at Achrinich, parish of Morven, Argyllshire, Scotland, son of Patric McNab and his wife Cirsty. He entered Blair College, a seminary near Aberdeen, in 1832 and in June 1835 to the Scots College in Rome but left before taking his oath as a missionary on 8 August 1840. He was ordained a priest in Scotland on 8 March 1845. He later stated that he had dreamed of becoming a missionary to the Aboriginal Australians at that time, perhaps inspired by what he had heard from the family of his fathers sister's family the MacKillop family in the colony of Victoria, but was refused by a bishop perpetually short of priests, and spent twenty years in parish work before finally migrating to Australia on board the Chariot of Fame in July 1867.

Here he was again refused permission to embark on a mission to the Aboriginal peoples until 1875 where he began work in the colony of Queensland. McNab firmly believed in restoring Aboriginal peoples to equal rights and considering their attachment to their land he believed that the best way of assisting them was to help them to become settlers on sections of their own tribal land and on equal terms to that of white settlers. However, his ideas was met with powerful opposition from settlers as well as from sections of the Catholic leadership, subsequently forced McNab to leave Queensland in 1882. He then began a mission amongst Aboriginal prisoners in Western Australia, later setting up a small mission station in Goodneough Bay in the remote north of the Kimberley region. Age and illness caused him to retire to Victoria where he died in 1896.

Duncan McNab, was a first cousin once removed to Sister Mary MacKillop.
