= A Writing Life: Helen Garner and Her Work =

Biography of Australian writer Helen Garner by Bernadette Brennan

A Writing Life
- Author: Bernadette Brennan
- Language: English
- Genre: Biography
- Publisher: Text Publishing
- Publication date: 3 April 2017
- Publication place: Australia
- Media type: Print
- Pages: 352 pp.
- ISBN: 9781925498035

A Writing Life is a 2017 biography of Australian writer Helen Garner written by Bernadette Brennan.

Brennan is a university lecturer teaching Australian literature at the University of Sydney. In the process of writing the book, she interviewed Garner, her family members and friends, and had access Garner's archives held at the National Library of Australia.

== Awards ==
- 2018 Stella Prize, longlist
- 2018 National Biography Award, shortlist
