= The Storm Weaver and the Sand =

2002 novel by Sean Williams

- The Storm Weaver and the Sand first edition cover.
- Author: Sean Williams
- Cover artist: Shaun Tan
- Language: English
- Series: The Books of the Change
- Genre: Fantasy
- Publisher: Voyager
- Publication date: November 27, 2002
- Publication place: Australia
- Media type: Print (Paperback)
- Pages: 674 pp (first edition)
- ISBN: 978-0-7322-6998-2
- Preceded by: The Sky Warden & the Sun

The Storm Weaver and the Sand is a 2002 fantasy novel by Sean Williams. It follows the second book in the series, The Sky Warden & the Sun, with Sal and Shilly finding shelter with the Stone Mages only to be betrayed and put forward for judgement by the Sky Wardens.

== Background ==
The Storm Weaver and the Sand was first published in Australia on November 27, 2002 by Voyager in trade paperback format. It was released in Australia and the United States in mass market paperback format in June 2003 and November 2009 respectively. The Storm Weaver and the Sand won the 2002 Aurealis Award for best fantasy novel. It also was nominated for the 2003 Ditmar Award for best Australian novel and finished ninth in the 2003 Locus Poll Award for best young adult novel.
