= J. C. Burke =

Australian author

- Born: Jane Burke; 1965 (age 60–61); Sydney, New South Wales, Australia
- Occupation: Novelist
- Writing career
- Notable awards: 2012 Ned Kelly Awards — Best Novel, winner

J. C. Burke (born 1965 in Sydney) is an Australian author, currently living in Sydney.

Jane Burke was born in 1965 in Sydney, where she was the fourth of five sisters; her parents were writers. Burke did not start publishing stories until 1999. Her mother died after suffering from cancer for 10 years, just after Burke's 19th birthday.

== Early life and education ==
Burke trained as a nurse at the Royal Prince Alfred Hospital and later specialised in oncology. In 2000, she took a creative writing course. After doing her course, she went to Sydney University with fellow Australian writer Libby Gleeson to take another writing course.

Her first novel was White Lies, which was published in 2002 with her mentor as Gary Crew. This book was made CBCA Notable Book for 2003. The Red Cardigan published 2004 was also a CBCA Notable Book as well as translated into Dutch and Swedish editions. Nine Letters Long, the sequel to The Red Cardigan was highly commended for the 2005 Aurealis Award for best horror novel, and The Story of Tom Brennan was awarded the 2006 Book of the Year for Older Readers by the Children's Book Council of Australia, and shortlisted for The Children's Peace Prize for Literature. It is on the current NSW Higher School Certificate prescriptions list as well as studied widely throughout Australia. Pig Boy was made a CBCA Notable Book for 2012 as well as an inclusion in the White Ravens Catalogue for Outstanding International Books. Burke's 10th novel The Things We Promise has been released in Australia, NZ and in the UK in 2017.

== Bibliography ==
- The Things We Promise (2017)
- Pretty Girl (2013)
- Pig Boy (2011)
- Ocean Pearl (2008)
- Starfish Sisters (2007)
- Faking Sweet (2006)
- The Story of Tom Brennan (2005)
- Nine Letters Long (2005)
- The Red Cardigan (2004)
- White Lies (2002)
