= Apartment 255 =

2001 novel by Bunty Avieson

- First edition
- Author: Bunty Avieson
- Language: English
- Genre: Novel
- Publisher: Macmillan, Australia
- Publication date: 2001
- Publication place: Australia
- Media type: Print Paperback
- Pages: 292 pp
- ISBN: 978-0-7329-1100-3
- OCLC: 155503760
- Followed by: The Affair

Apartment 255 is a 2001 Ned Kelly Award-winning novel by the Australian author Bunty Avieson.

== Plot ==
'Apartment 255' is the story of two best friends since school - Sarah and Ginny - who are, at the time of the book's telling, adults. Things are depicted as much better for Sarah - who has a boyfriend Tom with whom she shares a stunning inner-city apartment. But things have not worked out so well for Ginny who wanted Tom, and didn't get him. She wants what Sarah has, and moves into an apartment overlooking Sarah and Tom's flat to stalk them.

== Publishing history ==
After the original publication by Macmillan, in 2001 in Australia the novel was reprinted as follows:

- Macmillan 2002, Australia
- Goldmann, 2003, Germany; translated into German
- Sony Magazines, 2005, Japan; translated into Japanese under the title Supūn sanpai shitto
- Momentum Books, 2016 Australia

== Awards ==
- Ned Kelly Awards for Crime Writing, Best First Novel Award, 2002: joint winner

== Reviews ==
- Australian Crime Fiction Database - Apartment 255 by Bunty Avieson
