= The Maid (novel) =

2022 novel by Nita Prose

The Maid: A Novel
- Author: Nita Prose
- Language: English
- Genre: Mystery
- Publisher: Ballantine Books
- Publication date: January 4, 2022
- Awards: Goodreads Choice Award (2022)
- ISBN: 9780593356159

The Maid: A Novel is a 2022 murder mystery debut novel by Canadian author Nita Prose.

In 2021, a film adaptation of the novel was announced, with Florence Pugh cast in the lead role.

== Plot ==
Molly Gray is a dedicated maid at the Regency Grand Hotel, where she finds immense joy in her job, particularly in returning messy rooms to a state of perfection. Her love for cleaning is intense, as she takes pride in the well-stocked maid's trolley with all its cleaning supplies. However, Molly's passion for cleanliness doesn't translate into an understanding of social cues or the ability to navigate relationships.

Molly is considered odd by her co-workers, who don't share her enthusiasm for their work. Her closest friend, her grandmother, has died, leaving her feeling alone. Molly is also easily deceived by cunning individuals.

One day, when Molly enters the penthouse suite to clean, she discovers the most prestigious hotel guest, Mr. Black, has been murdered. Due to a series of comically unfortunate events, Molly becomes the prime suspect in the murder investigation, leading to a scandal that not only threatens the hotel's reputation but also her own livelihood.

== Reception ==
The Maid was generally well-received by critics, including starred reviews from Booklist, Library Journal, and Shelf Awareness.

Booklist's Emily Melton called The Maid novel "captivating, charming, and heart-warming", noting that "this unusual crime novel will leave readers with a warm glow". Kirkus Reviews referred to it as "a compelling take on the classic whodunit", writing, "Though the unusual ending might frustrate some readers, this unique debut will keep them reading". Tara Laskowski of the Washington Independent Review of Books said, "This cozy whodunit is a joy from the first page to the last." NPR's Bethanne Patrick said the novel "satisfies on every level — from place to plot to protagonist."

Multiple reviewers discussed Prose's main character, Molly. Publishers Weekly called Molly "a sharply drawn protagonist for whom readers can't help rooting." Amidst other praise for the novel, Shelf Awareness's Kathleen Gerard wrote, "It's the pure, learning-as-she-goes charm and naiveté of Molly and her inimitable narrative voice--the truth of her lovably eccentric old soul--that readers will not soon forget." Tara Laskowski of the Washington Independent Review of Books highlighted how "Molly's voice is distinguishing from the very first page: 'Every day in every way' and 'Need a tissue for your issue?'", as well as "her unique take on life and her plucky optimism." In a more negative review, Irish Independent's Margaret Madden called Molly "charming," though noted she " is not consistent enough—either verbally or in her thoughts—to be believable".

Reviewers also referenced the plot. Booklist's Melton called the plot "clever" and "original", while Shelf Awareness's Kathleen Gerard called it "delightfully crafted" and "suspenseful". Publishers Weekly highlighted the numerous plot twists in The Maid, saying, "Not every twist feels earned, but on balance Prose delivers a gratifying, kindhearted whodunit." NPR's Patrick noted that "while some readers may guess who the killer is immediately, it doesn't really matter, as the book is more about Molly — who does not".

The New York Times also reviewed The Maid.

The audiobook, narrated by Lauren Ambrose, received positive reviews as well. Booklist's Jennifer Kinnavy noted that "Ambrose delivers a pitch-perfect performance of Molly and the interesting cast of characters." Similarly, Laurie Muchnick, writing for Kirkus, said Ambrose provides "a perfect example of a narrator bringing the writer's intention to light".

The BBC broadcast a ten episode abridged reading of the novel, performed by Bridget Lappin, adapted by Rowan Routh, on BBC Radio 4, between Monday the 5th and Friday the 16th of September, 2022. It has subsequently been made available for listening to on the BBC Sounds site.

== Awards and honors ==
The Maid was a The New York Times and IndieBound bestseller. It was also the second-most borrowed book from Seattle Public Library in 2022.

Kirkus Reviews included the novel on their list of the best books of 2022. The audiobook landed on Libro.fm's list of the top ten audiobooks sold in 2022.

Awards for The Maid
Year	Award	Result	Ref.
2022	Goodreads Choice Award for Debut Novel	Nominee	
2022	Goodreads Choice Award for Mystery & Thriller	Winner	
2023	Anthony Award for Best First Novel	Nominee	
2023	Anthony Award for Best Hardcover Novel	Nominee	
2023	Audie Award for Mystery	Finalist	
2023	Barry Award for Best First Novel	Nominee	
2023	Edgar Award for Best Novel	Shortlist	
