= Death Delights =

2001 novel by Gabrielle Lord

- First edition
- Author: Gabrielle Lord
- Language: English
- Series: Jack McCain
- Genre: Crime novel
- Publisher: Hodder Headline, Sydney
- Publication date: 2001
- Publication place: Australia
- Media type: Print Paperback
- Pages: 324pp
- ISBN: 978-0-7336-1313-5
- OCLC: 48794079
- Followed by: Lethal Factor

Death Delights is a 2001 Ned Kelly Award-winning novel by the Australian author Gabrielle Lord.

This novel is the first in the Jack McCain series, followed by Lethal Factor (2003) and Dirty Weekend (2005).

== Synopsis ==
Jack Mcain is a forensic scientist and ex-crime scene detective who is drawn into an investigating a series of gruesome paedophile murders. As McCain progresses he finds connections to the disappearance of his teenage daughter Jacinta.

== Awards ==
- Ned Kelly Awards for Crime Writing, Best Novel, 2002: winner

== Notes ==
- Dedication: "To Greg, the original Reginald, and to all the friends of Bill W."

== Reviews ==
A reviewer at the Australian Crime Fiction HQ website noted: "In a story full of complexities and coincidences, McCain's personal and professional lives are eerily intertwined, driving him on with an almost manic determination...With numerous sub-plots running through the book dealing with so many emotionally sensitive issues, it's just not possible to grow bored with this story. There's rarely a moment of downtime with Jack McCain showing all the signs of a workaholic. Frantic is the best word that sums up Death Delights because McCain does everything at one pace - flat out. This is great for solving crimes but, as we are to find out, it can cause havoc with the family life."
