= Jock Serong =

Australian novelist

- Born: Justin Serong
- Education: Xavier College; Melbourne University
- Writing career
- Language: English
- Period: 2014–
- Genre: Historical fiction
- Notable awards: Ned Kelly Award for Best First Novel, ARA Historical Novel Prize, Staunch Prize
- Website: www.jockserong.com

Jock Serong is an Australian novelist and journalist. Serong grew up in the Melbourne suburb of Bayside and completed his secondary education at Xavier College in Kew. From years 4 to 8 he attended Xavier College's Kostka Hall junior campus in Brighton. He graduated from the University of Melbourne in 1995 with an LLB. He now resides in Port Fairy in regional Victoria with his wife and children. He is a former lawyer, and also majored in archaeology at university. He co-edited the short-lived journal Great Ocean Quarterly established in 2013.

== Bibliography ==
| Target/type | Series/description | Title | Date | Publisher |
|---|---|---|---|---|
| Adult fiction | Crime novel | Quota | 2014 | Text Publishing |
| Adult fiction | Crime novel | The Rules of Backyard Cricket | 2016 | Text Publishing |
| Adult fiction | Furneaux trilogy, book 1 (historical novel) | Preservation | 2018 | Text Publishing |
| Adult fiction | Thriller | On the Java Ridge | 2019 | Text Publishing |
| Adult fiction | Furneaux trilogy, book 2 (historical novel) | The Burning Island | 2020 | Text Publishing |
| Adult fiction | Furneaux trilogy, book 3 (historical novel) | The Settlement | 2022 | Text Publishing |
| Adult fiction | Short story anthology | Minds Went Walking: Paul Kelly's Songs Reimagined (editor and chapter "The Fastest Ford in Western Australia") | 2022 | Fremantle Press |
| Adult fiction | Literary novel | Cherrywood | 2024 | Fourth Estate |
| Non-fiction | Biography | A Suitable Man – The Eccentric Empire of Fletcher Jones | 2026 | HarperCollins |

The Furneaux trilogy are historical novels set in and around the Furneaux Islands in Bass Strait and south-east Australia.

== Awards ==
| Awards | |
|---|---|
| ARA Historical Novel Prize | The Burning Island, winner 2021 |
| ARA Historical Novel Prize | The Settlement, shortlisted 2023 |
| Colin Roderick Award | The Rules of Backyard Cricket, shortlisted 2017 |
| Colin Roderick Award | On the Java Ridge, winner 2018 |
| Colin Roderick Award | The Settlement, longlisted 2023 |
| Ned Kelly Award | Quota, winner 2015, Best First Novel |
| Ned Kelly Award | The Rules of Backyard Cricket, shortlisted 2017, Best Novel |
| Staunch Book Prize | On the Java Ridge, winner 2018 |
