= Candice Fox =

Australian novelist

- Born: 1985; Bankstown, New South Wales
- Occupation: Author
- Writing career
- Language: English
- Years active: 2014-
- Genre: Crime
- Notable works: Eden, Never Never
- Notable awards: Ned Kelly Award (3)

Candice Fox (born 1985) is an Australian novelist, best known for her crime fiction. She has collaborated with James Patterson on several novels.

== Early life and education ==
Candice Fox was born in 1985 the western suburbs of Sydney into a large family. She spent a brief period in the Royal Australian Navy before studying and teaching at university level.

== Career ==
Fox has written many novels, mainly crime fiction.

In 2015, Fox started collaborating on a series of novels with bestselling American author James Patterson.

== Published works ==
=== Novels ===
- The Inn (2019) (collaboration with James Patterson)
- Gathering Dark (2020)
- The Chase (2021)
- Fire With Fire (2023)
- Devil's Kitchen (2024)
- High Wire (2024)
- Redbelly Crossing (2026)

==== Two Sisters Detective Agency ====
- 2 Sisters Detective Agency (2021), with James Patterson, Little, Brown and Company ISBN 978-1538704585
- 2 Sisters Murder Investigations: A Thriller (2025), with James Patterson, Little, Brown and Company ISBN 978-1538758496

==== Archer and Bennett ====
- Hades (2014)
- Eden (2014)
- Fall (2015)

==== Detective Harriet Blue ====
- Never Never (collaboration with James Patterson) (2016)
- Fifty Fifty (collaboration with James Patterson) (2017)
- Liar Liar (collaboration with James Patterson) (2018)
- Hush Hush (collaboration with James Patterson) (2019)

==== Crimson Lake ====
- Crimson Lake (2017)
- Redemption Point (2018)
- Gone By Midnight (2019)

=== Novellas ===
- Black and Blue (collaboration with James Patterson) (2016)

== Adaptations ==
Troppo (2022), an ABC TV/IMDb TV adaptation of Crimson Lake starring Thomas Jane and Nicole Chamoun premiered on 27 February in Australia and on 20 May 2022 in the United States.

In March 2022 Gathering Dark was optioned for adaptation by Renegade Entertainment.

== Awards ==
- 2014: Ned Kelly Award for Best First Novel, for Hades
- 2015: Ned Kelly Award for Best Fiction, for Eden
- 2016 short-listed, Ned Kelly Award for Best Fiction, Fall
- 2016 shortlisted Davitt Award Best Adult Crime Novel, Fall
- 2017 shortlisted Ned Kelly Award for Best Fiction, Crimson Lake
- 2018 shortlisted Davitt Award Best Adult Crime Novel, Crimson Lake
- 2019 shortlisted Ned Kelly Award for Best Fiction, Redemption Point
- 2019 shortlisted Davitt Award Best Adult Crime Novel, Redemption Point
- 2020 shortlisted Ned Kelly Award for Best Fiction, Gathering Dark
- 2020 shortlisted Davitt Award Best Adult Crime Novel, Gathering Dark
- 2022: Ned Kelly Award for Best Fiction, for The Chase in 2022.
