= Dave Warner (musician) =

Australian writer, musician

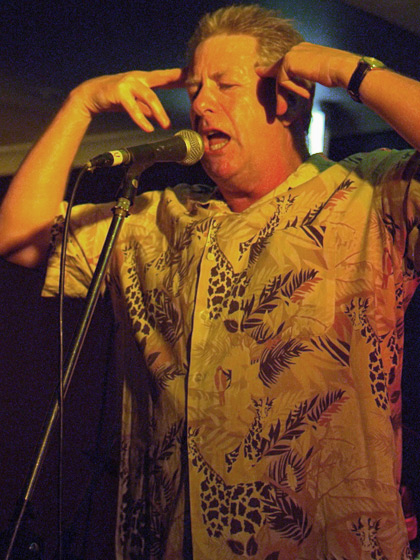
- Warner in Sydney, November 2007

Background information
- Born: David Robert Warner; 1953 (age 72–73); Bicton, Western Australia
- Genres: Post punk, rock 'n' roll
- Occupations: Musician, author, screenwriter
- Instruments: Vocals, guitar
- Years active: 1973–present
- Label: Mushroom
- Formerly of: From the Suburbs
- Website: Official website

David Robert Warner (born 1953) is an Australian rock musician, author and screenwriter. He lives in Sydney with his wife and three children.

== Biography ==
Dave Warner was born David Robert Warner in Bicton, Western Australia in 1953. He attended Aquinas College and then the University of Western Australia where he graduated with a B.A. (Hons.), majoring in psychology.

=== Musical works ===
In 1973, he formed the band Pus, which was influenced by radical 1960s New York activist band, The Fugs. Warner describes this band on his website as "Australia's first punk band". Warner's song writing created his first version of "Suburban Boy" in 1976. He gained a wider popularity with his next band, From the Suburbs, which he formed in January 1977. The band gained an underground following and was subsequently signed by Mushroom Records.

As Dave Warner's From the Suburbs, they re-released "Suburban Boy" (1978) as a single and then Mugs Game (1978) with some tracks recorded live at Melbourne University, it was certified Gold within a month of its release. Free Kicks (1979) followed, but then From the Suburbs disbanded. With a new line-up, Warner released Correct Weight (1979) and This is My Planet (1981; reissued as This is Your Planet in 1996).

After This is My Planet, Warner diversified from writing and performing music full-time. Instead, he started to write plays, novels and screenplays.

=== Theatrical works ===
In 1982, his revue, The Sensational Sixties started to tour large suburban hotels. Written and produced by Warner, the show was successful. In 1985, Warner wrote and appeared in a musical, The Sixties and All That Pop. Later that year Planet Pres, a rock musical written by him, was produced by the WA Theatre Company, and performed at the Playhouse Theatre.

In 1987, Warner managed and wrote songs for a female trio, Pleasure Principle. He performed (and wrote) a one-man show, Australian Heroes. He had a small parts in the movies Boundaries of the Heart (1988) and Boys in the Island (1989).

=== Screen works ===
The first feature film written by Warner, Cut (2000), was a teen slasher starring Molly Ringwald and Kylie Minogue. He followed up with Balmain Boys (TV movie) and Garage Days (both 2002) and then Ravenswood (2006) starring Stephen Moyer and Teresa Palmer. He was one of the chief writers of the drama TV series Going Home and the short TV feature Roll, as well as writing more than ten episodes of McLeod's Daughters. Warner wrote in an episode of Packed to the Rafters that featured his single Suburban Boy in a storyline starring Craig McLachlan as a faded 1980s rock star. In 1994 he hosted the ABC Sunday morning football program Ballzup!.

=== Literary works ===
Warner has written both fiction and non-fiction. His first novel, a crime story called City of Light, was published in 1995. It was the winner of the Best Fiction Work award at the Western Australian Premier's Book Awards in 1996. In the same year his second book, Footy's Hall of Shame also came out, featuring cartoons by Steve Panozzo. In 1997, Warner's second crime novel, Big Bad Blood was published. He then wrote the first one in a series of humorous crime novels in the style of Agatha Christie, Murder in the Groove. Published in 1998, the book featured Andrew "The Lizard" Zirk, a former rock star turned detective. In the same year were also published Racing's Hall of Shame (co-written with Nicolas Brasch), Cricket's Hall of Shame (again with cartoons by Panozzo) and 25 Years of Mushroom Records. The second novel featuring "Lizard" Zirk, Murder in the Frame, was published in 1999. In 2000, Warner published eXXXpresso, a novel about an ex-criminal who intends to build a chain of prison-themed cafés, and Murder in the Off-Season, the third "Lizard" Zirk novel.

== Bibliography ==
=== Fiction ===
Andrew "Lizard" Zirk series

- Murder in the Groove (1998)
- Murder in the Frame (1999)
- Murder in the Off-Season (2000)

Dan Clement and Snowy Lane series

- City of Light (1995)
- Before It Breaks (2015)
- Clear to the Horizon (2017)
- After the Flood (2022)
- When It Rains (2024)

Other works

- Big Bad Blood (1997)
- Great Australian Bites (edited by) (1997)
- eXXXpresso (2000)
- River of Salt (2019)
- Summer of Blood (2023)

=== Non-fiction ===
- Footy's Hall of Shame (1996)
- 25 Years of Mushroom Records (1998)
- Cricket's Hall of Shame (1998)
- Horseracing's Hall of Shame (1999)

== Discography ==
=== Studio albums ===
List of studio albums, with selected details and chart positions
Title	Album details	Peak chart positions
Title	Album details	AUS
Mugs Game (as Dave Warner's from the Suburbs)	Released: November 1978; Format: LP, cassette; Label: Mushroom (L 36759)	23
Free Kicks (as Dave Warner's from the Suburbs)	Released: April 1979; Format: LP, cassette; Label: Mushroom (L 36910)	34
Correct Weight (as Dave Warner's from the Suburbs)	Released: November 1979; Format: LP, cassette; Label: Mushroom (L 37124)	78
This is My Planet	Released: December 1981; Format: LP, cassette; Label: Mercury (6437146)	75
When	Released: 2016; Format: CD, DD; Label: Ocean Studios (333903)	—

=== Live albums ===
List of live albums, with selected details
Title	Details
Suburbs tn the '70s (as Dave Warner's from the Suburbs)	Released: 1990; Format: 2xCD; Label: DRAW Music (DRAW 333894)

=== Compilation albums ===
List of compilation albums, with selected details
Title	Details
Suburban Sprawl (as Dave Warner's from the Suburbs)	Released: 1990; Format: 2×LP, cassette, CD; Label: Mushroom (L 30415)
Correct Planet (as Dave Warner's from the Suburbs)	Released: 2016; Format: 2xLP, Cassette, CD; Label: DRAW Music (DRAW333901)

=== EPs ===
List of extended plays, with selected details
Title	Details
Meanwhile in the Suburbs	Released: 1988; Format: Cassette, CD; Label: Musicland Releases (MUS MLP 2003)

=== Singles ===
List of singles, with selected chart positions
Title	Year	Peak chart positions
Title	Year	AUS
"Suburban Boy"	1976	—
"Summer '78" (as Dave Warner's from the Suburbs)	1978	—
"Suburban Boy" (as Dave Warner's from the Suburbs)	1978	31
"(We Got) Nothing to Lose" (as Dave Warner's from the Suburbs)	1979	—
"Free Kicks"	1979	—
"Wimbledon"	1979	—
"Kookaburra Girl"	1981	73
"Half Time at the Football"	1981	—
"A Million Miles from Home"	1981	—
"Tonight"	1981	—
"Key to the City"	1989	—

== Awards ==
=== West Australian Music Industry Awards ===
The West Australian Music Industry Awards are annual awards celebrating achievements for Western Australian music. They commenced in 1985.

Year	Nominee / work	Award	Result
1992	Dave Warner	Rock 'n' Roll of Renown	inductee
