= 2010 in Australian literature =

This article presents a list of the historical events and publications of Australian literature during 2010.

== Events ==
- 26 January – Peter Goldsworthy is awarded a Member (AM) in the General Division in the Australia Day Honours List.
- February – The "Australian Book Review" magazine conducted a poll of its readers and announces that Cloudstreet by Tim Winton is Australia's favourite novel.
- 22 June – Peter Temple wins the Miles Franklin Award for his novel Truth becoming the first crime novel to do so.

== Major publications ==
=== Literary fiction ===
- Jon Bauer – Rocks in the Belly
- Carmel Bird – Child of the Twilight
- Ashley Hay – The Body in the Clouds
- Anita Heiss – Manhattan Dreaming
- Toni Jordan – Fall Girl
- Amanda Lohrey – Reading Madame Bovary (short story collection)
- Roger McDonald – When Colts Ran
- Fiona Kelly McGregor – Indelible Ink
- Monica McInerney – At Home with the Templetons
- Kate Morton – The Distant Hours
- D.B.C. Pierre – Lights Out in Wonderland
- Jessica Rudd – Campaign Ruby
- Kim Scott – That Deadman Dance
- Chris Womersley – Bereft

=== Children's and Young Adult fiction ===
- Alexandra Adornetto – Halo
- John Flanagan – The Emperor of Nihon-Ja
- Mem Fox – Let's Count Goats!
- Sonya Hartnett – The Midnight Zoo
- Rebecca James – Beautiful Malice
- Alison Lester – Noni the Pony
- Doug MacLeod – The Life of a Teenage Body-Snatcher
- Melina Marchetta – The Piper's Son
- Garth Nix – Lord Sunday
- Markus Zusak – Bridge of Clay

=== Science Fiction and Fantasy ===
- John Birmingham – After America
- Trudi Canavan – The Ambassador's Mission
- Sara Creasy – Song of Scarabaeus
- Sara Douglass – The Infinity Gate
- Greg Egan – Zendegi
- Fiona McIntosh – King's Wrath
- Sean McMullen – "Eight Miles"
- Juliet Marillier – Seer of Sevenwaters
- Shaun Micallef – Preincarnate
- Scott Westerfeld – Behemoth
- Sean Williams
  - The Force Unleashed II
  - Star Wars: The Old Republic: Fatal Alliance

=== Crime and Mystery ===
- Lenny Bartulin – The Black Russian
- John Birmingham – After America
- Honey Brown – The Good Daughter
- Peter Corris – Torn Apart
- Garry Disher – Wyatt
- Kathryn Fox – Death Mask
- Kerry Greenwood – Dead Man's Chest: A Phryne Fisher Mystery
- Katherine Howell – Cold Justice
- Adrian Hyland – Gunshot Road
- Colleen McCullough – Naked Cruelty
- Geoff McGeachin – The Diggers Rest Hotel
- Tara Moss – The Blood Countess
- P. M. Newton – The Old School
- Malla Nunn – Let the Dead Lie
- Leigh Redhead – Thrill City
- Michael Robotham – Bleed for Me
- Angela Savage – The Half-Child
- David Whish-Wilson – Line of Sight

=== Poetry ===
- Brook Emery ed. (with Victoria Haritos)
  - Earthly Matters: Biology and Geology Poems
  - Law and Impulse: Maths and Chemistry Poems
- Brook Emery ed. (with John L Sheppard and Victoria Haritos) – Holding Patterns: Physics and Engineering Poems
- Christopher Kelen – The Whole Forest Dancing: Poems on Four Legs in the Morning
- Les Murray – Taller When Prone
- Dorothy Porter – Love Poems
- Peter Porter – The Rest on the Flight: Selected Poems
- Thomas Shapcott – Parts of Us
- John Tranter – Starlight: 150 Poems
- Mark Tredinnick – Fire Diary

=== Biography ===
- Blanche d'Alpuget – Hawke: The Prime Minister
- Jeff Apter – Together Alone: The Story of the Finn Brothers
- Jim Davidson – A Three Cornered Life: The Historian W.K. Hancock
- Sheila Fitzpatrick – My Father's Daughter
- Malcolm Fraser & Margaret Simons – Malcolm Fraser: The Political Memoirs
- Rob Mundle – Bligh: Master Mariner
- Anne Pender – One Man Show: The Stages of Barry Humphries
- Mark Logue & Peter Conradi – The King's Speech: How One Man Saved the British Monarchy

== Awards and honours ==
=== Lifetime achievement ===
Award	Author
Christopher Brennan Award	Peter Steele
Patrick White Award	David Foster

=== Literary ===
Award	Author	Title	Publisher
The Age Book of the Year	Alex Miller	Lovesong	Allen & Unwin
ALS Gold Medal	David Malouf	Ransom	Knopf Australia
Colin Roderick Award	Michael Cathcart	The Water Dreamers	Text Publishing
Indie Book Awards Book of the Year	Not awarded		
Nita Kibble Literary Award	Shirley Walker	The Ghost at the Wedding	Viking

=== Fiction ===
==== International ====
Award	Region	Category	Author	Title	Publisher
Commonwealth Writers' Prize	SE Asia and South Pacific	Best First Book	Glenda Guest	Siddon Rock	Vintage Australia

==== National ====
Award	Author	Title	Publisher
Adelaide Festival Awards for Literature	David Malouf	Ransom	Random House
The Age Book of the Year Award	Alex Miller	Lovesong	Allen & Unwin
The Australian/Vogel Literary Award	Not awarded (change of award year date)		
Barbara Jefferis Award	Kristina Olsson	The China Garden	University of Queensland Press
Indie Book Awards Book of the Year – Fiction	Not awarded		
Indie Book Awards Book of the Year – Debut Fiction	Not awarded		
Miles Franklin Award	Peter Temple	Truth	Text Publishing
Prime Minister's Literary Awards	Eva Hornung	Dog Boy	Text Publishing
New South Wales Premier's Literary Awards	J.M. Coetzee	Summertime	Harvill Secker
Queensland Premier's Literary Awards	J.M. Coetzee	Summertime	Harvill Secker
South Australian Premier's Awards	David Malouf	Ransom	Knopf Australia
Victorian Premier's Literary Award	Peter Temple	Truth	Text Publishing
Western Australian Premier's Book Awards	Kim Scott	That Deadman Dance	Picador

=== Children and Young Adult ===
==== National ====
Award	Category	Author	Title	Publisher
Children's Book of the Year Award	Older Readers	David Metzenthen	Jarvis 24	Penguin Group
Children's Book of the Year Award	Younger Readers	Odo Hirsch	Darius Bell and the Glitter Pond	Allen & Unwin
Children's Book of the Year Award	Picture Book	Gregory Rogers	The Hero of Little Street	Allen & Unwin
Children's Book of the Year Award	Early Childhood	Lisa Shanahan, illus. Emma Quay	Bear & Chook By the Sea	Lothian
Indie Book Awards Book of the Year	Children's & YA	Not Awarded		
New South Wales Premier's Literary Awards	Children's	Allan Baillie	Krakatoa Lighthouse	Penguin Books Australia
New South Wales Premier's Literary Awards	Young People's	Pamela Rushby	When the Hipchicks Went to War	Hachette
Queensland Premier's Literary Awards	Children's	Sally Murphy	Toppling	Walker Books
Queensland Premier's Literary Awards	Young Adult	Richard Yaxley	Drink the Air	Richard Yaxley
South Australian Premier's Awards	Children's	Shaun Tan	Tales from Outer Suburbia	Allen and Unwin
Victorian Premier's Literary Award	Young Adult Fiction	Kirsty Eagar	Raw Blue	Penguin Group
Western Australian Premier's Book Awards	Children's	Sally Murphy	Toppling	Walker Books
Western Australian Premier's Book Awards	Writing for Young Adults	Scott Gardner	Happy as Larry	Allen and Unwin
Western Australian Premier's Book Awards	Writing for Young Adults	James Roy	Anonymity Jones	Woolshed Press

=== Crime and Mystery ===
==== National ====
Award	Category	Author	Title	Publisher
Davitt Award	Novel	Marianne Delacourt	Sharp Shooter	Arena
Davitt Award	Young adult novel	Justine Larbalestier	Liar	Allen & Unwin
Davitt Award	True crime	Ellen Connolly and Candace Sutton	Ladykiller	Allen & Unwin
Davitt Award	Readers' choice	Kerry Greenwood	Forbidden Fruit	Allen & Unwin
Ned Kelly Award	Novel	Garry Disher	Wyatt	Text Publishing
Ned Kelly Award	First novel	Mark Dapin	King of the Cross	Pan Macmillan
Ned Kelly Award	True crime	Kathy Marks	Pitcairn: Paradise Lost	Fourth Estate
Ned Kelly Award	Lifetime achievement	Peter Doyle		

=== Science fiction ===
Award	Category	Author	Title	Publisher
Aurealis Award	SF Novel	Marianne de Pierres	Transformation Space	Orbit Books
Aurealis Award	SF Short Story	K.J. Bishop	"The House of a Mouse"	Subterrannean Online
Aurealis Award	Fantasy Novel	Tansy Rayner Roberts	Power and Majesty	HarperVoyager
Aurealis Award	Fantasy Short Story	Thoraiya Dyer	"Yowie"	Twelfth Planet Press (Sprawl)
Aurealis Award	Fantasy Short Story	L.L. Hannett and Angela Slatter	"The February Dragon"	Ticonderoga Publications (Scary Kisses)
Aurealis Award	Horror Novel	Kirstyn McDermott	Madigan Mine	Pan Macmillan
Aurealis Award	Horror Short Story	Richard Harland	"The Fear"	Brimstone Press (Macabre: A Journey Through Australia's Darkest Fears)
Australian Shadows Award	Long Fiction	Bob Franklin	Under Stones	Affirm Press
Australian Shadows Award	Edited Publication	Angela Challis & Marty Young	Macabre: A Journey through Australia's Darkest Fears	Brimstone Press
Australian Shadows Award	Short Fiction	Kirstyn McDermott	"She Said"	Scenes from the Second Storey, Morrigan Books
Ditmar Award	Novel	Kaaron Warren	Slights	Angry Robot Books
Ditmar Award	Novella/Novelette	Paul Haines	"Wives"	X6 (Coeur de Lion)
Ditmar Award	Short Story	Cat Sparks	"Seventeen"	Masques (CSFG)
Ditmar Award	Collected Work	Geoffrey Maloney ed.	Slice of Life, Paul Haines	The Mayne Press

=== Poetry ===
Award	Author	Title	Publisher
Adelaide Festival Awards for Literature	Bronwyn Lea	The Other Way Out	Giramondo Publishing
The Age Book of the Year	Jennifer Maiden	Pirate Rain	Giramondo Publishing
Anne Elder Award	Rosanna Licari	An Absence of Saints	University of Queensland Press
Grace Leven Prize for Poetry	David Musgrave	Phantom Limb	John Leonard Press
Grace Leven Prize for Poetry	LK Holt	Patience, Mutiny	John Leonard Press
Grace Leven Prize for Poetry	Petra White	The Simplified World	John Leonard Press
Mary Gilmore Prize	Joanna Preston	The Summer King	Otago University Press
New South Wales Premier's Literary Awards	Jordie Albiston	the sonnet according to 'm'	John Leonard Press
Queensland Premier's Literary Awards	Peter Boyle	Apocrypha	Vagabond Press
Victorian Premier's Literary Award	Anna Kerdijk Nicholson	Possession	Five Islands Press
Western Australian Premier's Book Awards	Mark Tredinnick	Fire Diary	Puncher and Wattmann

=== Drama ===
Award	Category	Author	Title	Publisher
New South Wales Premier's Literary Awards	Script	Jane Campion	Bright Star	BBC Films; Screen Australia; UK Film Council; New South Wales Film and Television Office
New South Wales Premier's Literary Awards	Script	Aviva Ziegler	Fairweather Man	Fury Productions
Patrick White Playwrights' Award	Award	Melissa Bubnic	Beached	Currency Press
Patrick White Playwrights' Award	Fellowship	Raimondo Cortese		

=== Non-Fiction ===
Award	Category	Author	Title	Publisher
Adelaide Festival Awards for Literature	Non-Fiction	Jill Roe	Stella Miles Franklin	Fourth Estate/HarperCollins
The Age Book of the Year	Non-fiction	Kate Howarth	Ten Hail Marys	Penguin Books
Children's Book of the Year Award	Eve Pownall Award for Information Books	Peter Macinnis	Australian Backyard Explorer	National Library of Australia
Davitt Award	True crime	Ellen Connolly and Candace Sutton	Lady Killer	Allen & Unwin
National Biography Award	Biography	Brian Matthews	Manning Clark: A Life	Allen & Unwin
Indie Book Awards Book of the Year	Non-Fiction	Not awarded		
Prime Minister's Literary Awards	Non-fiction	Grace Karskens	The Colony: A History of Early Sydney	Allen & Unwin
New South Wales Premier's Literary Awards	Non-fiction	Paul McGeough	Kill Khalid: Mossad's failed hit ... and the rise of Hamas	Allen & Unwin
New South Wales Premier's History Awards	Australian History	Bain Attwood	Possession: Batman's Treaty and the Matter of History	Melbourne University Publishing
New South Wales Premier's History Awards	Community and Regional History	Pauline Curby	Randwick	Randwick Municipal Council
New South Wales Premier's History Awards	General History	Lisa Ford	Settler Sovereignty: Jurisdiction and Indigenous People in America and Australia, 1788-1836	Harvard University Press
New South Wales Premier's History Awards	Young People's	Jackie French	The Night They Stormed Eureka	HarperCollins
Queensland Premier's Literary Awards	Non-fiction	Mark Tredinnick	The Blue Plateau: A Landscape Memoir	UQP
Queensland Premier's Literary Awards	History	Ian Hoskins	Sydney Harbour: A history,	NewSouth Books
Victorian Premier's Literary Award	Non-fiction	Brenda Walker	Reading by Moonlight: How Books Saved a Life	Penguin Books
Western Australian Premier's Book Awards	Non-fiction	Jim Davidson	The Historian: W K Hancock	University of New South Wales Press
Western Australian Premier's Book Awards	Western Australian history	Susanna Iuliano	Vite Italiane, Italian Lives in Western Australia	University of Western Australia Press

== Deaths ==
- 15 March — Patricia Wrightson, author (born 1921)
- 23 April — Peter Porter, author (born 1929)
- 29 May — Randolph Stow, author (died in England)(born 1935)
- 9 July — Jessica Anderson, author (born 1916)
- 19 July — Jon Cleary, author (born 1917)
- 6 September — John McKellar, playwright (born 1930)
- 8 September — Donald Horne, author (born 1921)
- 6 October — David Rowbotham, author (born 1924)
- 14 November — Bobbi Sykes, poet and author (born 1943)
- 14 December — Ruth Park, author (born 1917)

== See also ==
- 2010 in Australia
- 2010 in literature
- 2010 in poetry
- List of years in Australian literature
- List of years in literature
- List of Australian literary awards
