= Signal Loss (novel) =

2016 novel by Australian writer Garry Disher

- Author: Garry Disher
- Language: English
- Series: Challis/Destry
- Genre: Crime novel
- Publisher: Text Publishing
- Publication date: 31 October 2016
- Publication place: Australia
- Media type: Print
- Pages: 336 pp.
- ISBN: 9781925355260
- Preceded by: Whispering Death
- Followed by: -

Signal Loss (2016) is a novel by Australian writer Garry Disher.

This is the seventh novel, and final, in the author's "Challis/Destry" series of crime novels, following The Dragon Man (1999), Kittyhawk Down (2003), Snapshot (2005), Chain of Evidence (2007), Blood Moon (2009) and Whispering Death (2011).

== Synopsis ==
It's bush-fire season on the Mornington Peninsula; Ellen Destry is heaing up a new sexual crimes unit which is investigating a serial rapist who seems to leave behind no clues at all, and Hal Challis is dealing with a meth crisis in the district. When two bodies are found in a burnt-out car, Challis suspects a double murder but his case is taken over by Melbourne's Major Drugs Division. Meanwhile Destry stumbles on a meth lab that may also be connected.

== Critical reception ==
Writing for the Newton Review of Books Karen Chisholm states: "Disher is not afraid to use his novels to explore difficult questions, to highlight injustices and to dig deep into law-enforcement frustrations – and what causes a lot of crime in the first place."

== Publication history ==
After its original publication in 2016 by Text Publishing the novel was later reprinted as follows:

- 2017 Text Publishing, Australia
- 2017 Soho Press, USA

The novel was also translated into Italian in 2019.

== See also ==
- 2017 in Australian literature
