= The Tournament at Gorlan =

Book by John Flanagan

- Author: John Flanagan
- Illustrator: Jeremy Reston
- Language: English
- Series: Ranger's Apprentice: The Early Years (Book no. 1)
- Genre: Fantasy, Adventure
- Publisher: Random House (AUS & NZ); Philomel (US)
- Publication date: 16 September 2015 (AUS & NZ); 6 October 2015 (US)
- Publication place: Australia
- Media type: Print (Paperback); E-book
- Pages: 400 (AUS); 384 (USA)
- ISBN: 9781742759302
- OCLC: 898419256
- Dewey Decimal: A823.4
- Preceded by: The Lost Stories
- Followed by: The Battle of Hackham Heath

The Tournament at Gorlan is the first novel in the Ranger's Apprentice: The Early Years series written by Australian author John Flanagan. It was first released in Australia on 16 September 2015, and in the United States on 6 October 2015. The series serves as a prequel to the Ranger's Apprentice series, and is a direct sequel to a story in The Lost Stories.

== Leading Events ==
In the story "The Hibernian" in The Lost Stories, it is described that Halt was living in Hibernia as an heir to the throne, but his younger brother kills his father to take the throne and attempts to murder Halt, forcing Halt to travel as a fugitive. Along the way, Halt met and was trained by former Ranger Pritchard, who had been dismissed by a baron named Morgarath. Morgarath was holding the King in his castle at Gorlan Fief using the excuse of protecting him from his son Prince Duncan, who had supposedly tried to poison the King. He was trying to gain influence over the King to eventually seize the throne, and was also trying to weaken the Ranger Corps by dismissing all senior "old-fashioned" Rangers and putting his own associates in their place.

== Plot ==
Halt and Crowley are journeying together in the woods of Gorlan Fief. They leave the fief and travel to a nearby village for the night. While at the village, they learn that Prince Duncan is supposedly raiding villages with a gang of men. Halt and Crowley then travel to another village, where they save the inhabitants from foreign invaders angry about Duncan's raiding. While at the village, Halt and Crowley later hear a raid by Duncan, where they realize that the "Duncan" is an impostor. After leaving the village, they intercept one of Morgarath's messengers, and discover through letters a list of 12 Rangers to be dismissed and that the real Duncan is being held captive at Castle Wildriver, while the fake Duncan was actually someone named Tiller. Halt and Crowley then travel to recruit the 12 Rangers, intending to capture Tiller and rescue the King and Duncan, and then reveal Morgarath's schemes at a tournament. They ultimately manage to recruit 11, since 1 Ranger was murdered, as well as Baron Arald, a baron who had defeated Morgarath in a major tournament and wielded significant influence among the barons. This would give the Rangers more political power if Morgarath had a trial. While traveling towards Castle Wildriver, the Rangers reunite with the old Ranger Pritchard.

The story not only serves as an introduction for the early Rangers Corps, but it brings new life to characters mentioned in The Ruins of Gorlan and The Burning Bridge that ultimately lead to Will Treaty joining the team and beginning his great adventure.
