= Whispering Death (novel) =

2011 novel by Australian writer Garry Disher

- Author: Garry Disher
- Language: English
- Series: Challis/Destry
- Genre: Crime novel
- Publisher: Text Publishing
- Publication date: 27 June 2011
- Publication place: Australia
- Media type: Print
- Pages: 330 pp.
- ISBN: 9781921758591
- Preceded by: Blood Moon
- Followed by: Signal Loss

Whispering Death (2011) is a novel by Australian writer Garry Disher.

This is the sixth novel in the author's "Challis/Destry" series of crime novels, following The Dragon Man (1999), Kittyhawk Down (2003), Snapshot (2005), Chain of Evidence (2007), and Blood Moon (2009).

== Synopsis ==
A rapist wearing a police uniform is stalking the Mornington Pensinula, as are a house-breaker and a serial armed robber. Meanwhile Challis is being pressured by his boss about a wave of graffiti and some indiscrete remarks he has made about police resourcing.

== Critical reception ==
In a short review in The Weekend Australian newspaper Graeme Blundell stated: "Disher cares about their interlinked worlds as much as he does about labyrinthine plots, fetishised violence and the showy brainwork of his coppers. As always this grand master propels us methodically yet elegiacally."

Reviewing the novel for The Sunday Age Thornton McCamish was also impressed with the work. "This very fine novel submits to the thriller conventions but with an easy freedom that makes it seem as if Disher made the rules himself. The genre's technical specs certainly present no difficulty. Before you know it, at least three separate stories are up and humming, each one growing more complicated and frightening scene by snappy scene."

== Publication history ==
After its original publication in 2011 by Text Publishing the novel was later reprinted as follows:

- 2012 Text Publishing, Australia
- 2013 Soho Press, USA

The novel was also translated into German in 2018.

== Notes ==
- Dedication: For Jo Tapper

== See also ==
- 2011 in Australian literature
