= Erak's Ransom =

Book by John Flanagan

- Second Australian edition cover of Erak's Ransom
- Author: John Flanagan
- Language: English
- Series: Ranger's Apprentice (Book no. 7)
- Genre: Fantasy, Adventure
- Publisher: Random House (Australia)
- Publication date: 1 November 2007 (Aus); 5 January 2010 (USA)
- Publication place: Australia
- Media type: Print (paperback)
- Pages: 441
- ISBN: 1-74166-209-5
- OCLC: 271078389
- Dewey Decimal: A823.4
- Preceded by: The Siege of Macindaw
- Followed by: The Kings of Clonmel

Erak's Ransom is the seventh novel in the continuing Ranger's Apprentice series by Australian author John Flanagan. The book was released in Australia on 1 November 2007 and in the United States on 5 January 2010. It is set between book four in the series, Oakleaf Bearers, and book five, The Sorcerer of the North.

In 2008, Flanagan won the Australian Publishers Association's Book of the Year for Older Children and the International Success Award for Erak's Ransom.

== Plot summary ==
Erak Starfollower becomes tired of paperwork after becoming the Oberjarl of Skandia during the events of Oakleaf Bearers. He decides to go on one last raid to the desert country of Arrida. His raiding party walks into an ambush and is captured; Erak's crew are eventually released in order to obtain a ransom for Erak, who is left behind. Meanwhile, at Castle Redmont, senior Ranger Halt and diplomat Lady Pauline are getting married. During the wedding after-party, Svengal, Erak's first mate, appears. In a small meeting with Ranger Will and the knight Horace, he reveals Erak's kidnapping, and also tells them that Erak thinks he was betrayed by a small congregant of Skandian dissenters located in Hallasholm who seek to depose him under the leadership of Toshak, a Jarl who was once a follower of the executed Slagor, the treacherous Skirl who previously sought to kill Cassandra.

Princess Cassandra begs her father, King Duncan, to supply the money for Erak's release. Duncan agrees but is unable to go himself as he is in talks with the Hibernian kings. Cassandra eventually volunteers herself, much to Duncan's chagrin. Will, Cassandra, Halt, Svengal, Horace, the ranger Gilan as well as thirty of Erak's men go to deliver the ransom, which delights Cassandra. As they travel, Cassandra and Will rekindle the friendship they somewhat lost in Oakleaf Bearers and Gilan offers Will advice as the young apprentice worries about how he will fare without Halt's guidance. Once in Arrida, they learn from Arridi leader Seley el'then that Erak had been sent to Mararoc, a fort in the desert. The party, guided by Seley el'then and his men, head to Mararoc.

During the journey, a sandstorm causes Will to lose his horse Tug. In an attempt to find him, Will gets lost and loses consciousness. A group of nomads called the Bedullin find and restore him, revealing that they have also found Tug. Will manages to reclaim Tug after winning a riding race against Hassan, who had found Tug and claimed him as his own.

Meanwhile, the others continue their journey to Mararoc. On the way they discover the corpses of the people escorting Erak. Seley el'then deduces that they were attacked by the Tualaghi, a nomadic tribe. Gilan scouts and discovers the Tualaghis, however, the Tualaghi also discover the Arridi party. The Tualaghis attack, though the Arridi group wins the first battle. However, the leader of the Tualaghi, Yusal, negotiates with Seley el'then, who is forced to surrender as their group is running out of water and cannot fight a sustained battle against Yusal. A Bedullin scout relays this information to the Bedullin, and the nomads offer to help rescue Will's friends. On the way, they find and rescue Seley el'then's soldiers, who had been betrayed and left to die by Yusal after surrendering.

The Tualaghis come into a desert town and lock the party in a storehouse where they had also put Erak. Toshak reveals himself and boasts of betraying Erak, intending to take over as Oberjarl after Erak is killed. Meanwhile, Will, the Bedullins, and the Arridi devise a plan to attack the town. Erak and the other prisoners are scheduled for execution. When the executions were scheduled, they built a platform for the execution. As Halt is pulled forward to be executed, Will shoots the executioner. Mayhem ensues, with Arridi and Bedullins mixed in with the crowd, revealing themselves and fighting the Tualaghi. The captured prisoners join in the fight and turn the tide against the Tualaghi. Erak kills Toshak, while Cassandra wounds Yusal in the head with her slingshot, permanently damaging his mind.

The Araluens return to their home country. Some time later, Will graduates from the Ranger program, with his friends cheering him on for his next chapter in his life.
