= Ranger's Apprentice: The Early Years =

Book series by John Flanagan

- The Tournament at Gorlan; The Battle of Hackham Heath
- Author: John Flanagan
- Country: Australia
- Language: English
- Genre: Fantasy, Adventure
- Publisher: Random House (AUS & NZ); Philomel (US & CAN); Yearling Books (UK); Beyaz Balina (TUR); Gottmer Uitgeverij (NL); Editora Fundamento (BR)
- Published: 16 September 2015 – present
- Media type: Print (paperback and hardcover) e-book
- No. of books: 2
- Preceded by: The Lost Stories (Ranger's Apprentice Book 11)
- Followed by: Ranger's Apprentice

Ranger's Apprentice: The Early Years is a book series by John Flanagan. It is a prequel to the original Ranger's Apprentice series. The series follows Halt and Crowley and is preceded by the short story "The Hibernian" in the book The Lost Stories, which is the 11th installment to the Ranger's Apprentice series.

== Books ==
=== The Tournament at Gorlan ===
The first installment, The Tournament at Gorlan released on 6 October 2015. After being relieved of his duty as a Ranger by Morgarath, Halt and Crowley are journeying together in the woods of Gorlan Fief. They leave the fief and travel to a nearby village for the night. There they learn that Prince Duncan is supposedly raiding villages with a gang of men. Halt and Crowley decide to find this Duncan and confront him about ruining his reputation and the reputation of the kingdom. The two then travel to another village where they save the inhabitants from foreign invaders angry about Duncan's raiding. Eventually Halt and Crowley learn that the Duncan they are searching for is an impostor. After leaving the village they intercept one of Morgarath's messengers. After knocking him unconscious they learn 12 Rangers are about to be dismissed and that the real Duncan is being held captive at Castle Wildriver. They also learn the fake Duncan is someone named Tiller. Halt and Crowley decide to recruit the 12 Rangers, intending to capture Tiller and rescue the King and Duncan, and then reveal Morgarath has been scheming to take over the kingdom at The Tournament at Gorlan, where Araleun's finest warriors meet and compete for glory. They ultimately manage to recruit 11 of the Rangers as well as Baron Arald, a baron who had defeated Morgarath in the previous years Tournament at Gorlan. Due to his calming voice and his victory Arald has significant influence among the barons. When the Rangers reunite with the old Ranger Pritchard, they realize it is time to make their move. The following events lead Morgarath to his exile in the mountains and cost some good men their lives, but it also leads to the coronation of a new king.

=== The Battle of Hackham Heath ===
A second volume, The Battle at Hackham Heath was released on 31 October 2016 in Australia and New Zealand and 29 November 2016 in the United States. In it peace has come to Araluen, but Halt and Crowley suspect that Morgarath is still scheming to take over the kingdom. When Morgarath attacks again with a new dangerous army of Wargals, the group realizes their suspicions have been correct. Halt decides to climb the deadly cliffs of the Mountains of Rain and Night. If he can do so successfully, he'll be able to become a valuable spy for Araluen. Eventually the Battle at Hackham Heath will decide the fate of one kingdom.
