= The Ruins of Gorlan =

Novel by John Flanagan

- Second Australian edition cover of The Ruins of Gorlan
- Author: John Flanagan
- Illustrators: Jeremy Reston (2nd Australian edition) and Alexapder Donatelli
- Language: English
- Series: Ranger's Apprentice (Book no. 1)
- Genre: Fantasy, Adventure
- Publisher: Random House (AUS); Philomel Books (USA); Beyaz Balina (TUR)
- Publication date: 1 November 2004 (AUS); 16 June 2005 (US); 5 April 2007 (UK)
- Publication place: Australia
- Media type: Print (Paperback and Hardcover)
- Pages: 280 (AUS edition); 282 (US paperback edition); 256 (US hardcover edition); 264 (TUR edition)
- ISBN: 978-0-14-240663-2
- OCLC: 225584636
- Dewey Decimal: A823.4
- Preceded by: The Battle of Hackham Heath (Ranger's Apprentice: The Early Years)
- Followed by: The Burning Bridge

The Ruins of Gorlan is the first novel in the Ranger's Apprentice series written by Australian author John Flanagan. It was first released in Australia on 1 November 2004, and in the United States on 16 June 2005. Flanagan first conceived the world of the novel in a series of short stories he wrote for his son to incite his interest in reading. Ten years later, he decided to turn them into The Ruins of Gorlan, the first book in the Ranger's Apprentice series.

== Concept and development ==
The Ruins of Gorlan was originally a set of short stories written by author John Flanagan for his son Michael to encourage him to read. Flanagan wrote one story each week for thirty weeks. About ten years later, Flanagan returned to these stories and decided to write them into a full-length novel. The character Horace was based on Michael's friend Jeremy, but in the original short stories Flanagan made Horace the villain. In the stories, Horace disappears after Will saves his life on the boar hunt, while in the novel, Flanagan was able to make Morgarath the main villain and "rehabilitate" Horace to keep him as a main character. Flanagan thought that the idea of a bully being bullied was a strong concept that was not in the original stories and was later incorporated into the novel. He planned this parallel storyline in Battleschool to develop and show how Horace could help Will through his "linear thinking". Flanagan was careful to make the distinction that Horace was not stupid, since he was, in fact, a straight thinker which helped balance Will's wild thinking. Will was based on Michael, and shared some of his physical attributes, including his small stature and agile movement. Most importantly, Flanagan wanted to show his son that there was an advantage to being small and that not all heroes have to be tall and strong.

== Plot ==
Morgarath, the exiled lord of the bleak, barren Mountains of Rain and Night has been waiting fifteen years in his dark realm, carefully planning his revenge against the Kingdom of Araluen. His former fief, known as Gorlan, was long ago brought to ruin as a result of his unsuccessful rebellion against King Duncan. Now he silently plots to rebel again, rallying hideous creatures known as Wargals to his side. Wargals have little will of their own, and are easy to control, therefore being suitable as soldiers in Morgarath's army. After fifteen years, Morgarath prepares to unleash his power, using two strong ape-like beasts called the Kalkara as assassins, to try to take the Kingdom once more.

Meanwhile, in Araluen, in Redmont Fief, a special day has come for 15-year-old Will and his fellow wardmates (Horace, Alyss, George, and Jenny), called Choosing Day, where they all become an apprentice to a craftmaster or have to work in the local farms. Jenny is apprenticed to Master Chubb, the castle cook. Horace is accepted to Battleschool, and George is accepted to Scribeschool, while Alyss is accepted as a courier. Although Will's first choice was battleschool (he does this because he thinks his father was a brave knight, although he doesn't know for sure what happened to him), Baron Arald (the baron of Redmont fief) explains to him that his talents lie in other directions. Instead of being accepted to Battleschool, he becomes apprenticed to Halt the Ranger, after sneaking into a guarded tower at the castle. Rangers are the intelligence group of the country and specialize in long-range weapons and the art of staying unseen. Will is not overly excited about this, but he is trained in these skills. The main reason why he is being trained in these skills is that he needs to prepare for the annual Ranger meeting called the Gathering. During this time he begins to establish a closeness to Halt and starts to realize that being a Ranger is much better than it seems. Will is given a horse named Tug, from an old horse trainer by the name of Old Bob.

In the meantime, Will's wardmate Horace is in Battleschool. His life is harsh and he is bullied by three second-year Battleschool cadets: Alda, Bryn, and Jerome. During a local holiday known as Harvest Day, Horace and Will fight, increasing their hatred for each other. Six weeks after this incident, Will and Halt find signs of a wild boar that has been roaming the area. They also meet a rambling, frightened farmer by the name of Salt Peter. The two get a group of men that will kill the boar, and Horace is recruited to the boar hunt. During the hunt, a young knight kills one boar, but while the other hunters are congratulating him, a second boar suddenly bursts out of its den and charges straight for Horace, who tries to kill it but slips and becomes vulnerable. Will distracts the boar and tries to kill it by shooting at its heart but fails, and is saved by inches from death by Halt's well-timed arrow. In saving Horace's life, he cements a friendship between Will and Horace and erases the lasting tension between the two. Sometime after the killing of the boar, Alda, Bryn, and Jerome corner Horace and beat him brutally. They then proceed to the forest to give Will the same treatment. He manages to evade the three for a few minutes but is quickly overpowered. Horace then arrives and intervenes, and the bullies leave Will to continue beating Horace. They are in turn stopped by Halt, who invites Horace to sword fight the bullies individually. One by one, he defeats them and incapacitates Alda. As a punishment, they are banished from the fief, making Horace closer to the Rangers. However, it has now come time for Halt and Will to leave for the Gathering. Here Will meets Halt's former apprentice, Gilan. During the Gathering, the Rangers receive a report that the Kalkara, vicious creatures under the control of Morgarath, have entered Araluen.

Halt, Will and Gilan leave to track down and kill the Kalkara. Halt thinks that the Kalkara is headed to the Ruins of Gorlan and tells Will to go back to Redmont, bring some soldiers and rendezvous at the ruins. At Redmont, Baron Arald, and Sir Rodney (Arald's battlemaster) head out to slay the Kalkara and to save Halt. Finding that Halt is battling the Kalkara alone (and not faring so well), Sir Rodney and Baron Arald manage to knock one into the fire, but are badly injured by the other. Will watches, horrified, and knows he must do something. He runs over to a torch that Baron Arald dropped, creates a fire arrow, and shoots the Kalkara in the chest, setting it on fire. Back at his fief, Will is considered a hero and receives his bronze oakleaf which identifies him as a Ranger's apprentice. When he and his ward mates reunite to congratulate him at an inn, Alyss surprisingly kisses Will. Meanwhile, Araluen prepares for a war with Lord Morgarath and his army of Wargals.

== Reception ==
Reviewers praised the action and characters of The Ruins of Gorlan. Steven Engelfried of School Library Journal enjoyed the description of Ranger crafts and meetings with bullies and a wild boar which "help to establish the boy's emerging character". Engelfried said the "well-paced plot moves effortlessly toward the climax, letting readers get to know the world and the characters gradually as excitement builds". However, he felt that the sudden welcome by the public was a little over the top since Rangers are described as silent and solitary. Carolyn Phelan from Booklist praised how Will is a normal hero without any magical skills making him a very original and believable character. Phelan also recognised the setting as "a colorful place, threatened by an evil warlord and his fierce minions, but it's the details of everyday living and the true-to-life emotions that are memorable". Kirkus Reviews found that "Flanagan does nothing to boost his typecast characters, familiar themes or conventional, video-game plot above the general run, but readers with a taste for quickly paced adventure with tidy, predictable resolutions (Kalkara and bullies vanquished, Will and Horace become heroes and buddies) won't be disappointed".

=== Awards ===
The Ruins of Gorlan received an Aurealis Award in 2004 and was chosen as the Children's Book Council of Australia Notable Book in 2005. In 2008, the book was nominated for the Grand Canyon Reader Award.

== Film adaptation ==
As of 7 January 2008, Warner Bros. Pictures has obtained the film rights for The Ruins of Gorlan and is in discussion with Canadian director Paul Haggis.

Although the film exhausted its funding not long after the original time the project began, author John Flanagan has confirmed that as of December 2014, the group had re-acquired the necessary funds, and were to start production summer 2015.

In January 2024 it was announced Skydance had picked up the rights to the franchise and was planning on adapting the first two Ranger’s Apprentice novels into a movie.
