= Fundamento =

Fundamento may refer to:

- Fundamento de Esperanto, a book by L. L. Zamenhof
- Editora Fundamento, a Brazilian book publisher
