= Halt's Peril =

Book by James Flanagan

Halt's perill
- Australian cover of Halt's Peril
- Author: John Flanagan
- Illustrator: Jeremy Reston (AUS)
- Language: English
- Series: Ranger's Apprentice #9
- Genre: Fantasy, adventure
- Publisher: Random House (AUS)
- Publication date: 2 November 2009 (AUS); 6 November 2009 (NZ); 5 October 2010 (US)
- Publication place: Australia
- Media type: Print (paperback)
- Pages: 386 pp.
- ISBN: 978-1-74166-302-0
- OCLC: 407072827
- Dewey Decimal: A823.4
- Preceded by: The Kings of Clonmel
- Followed by: The Emperor of Nihon-Ja

Halt's Peril is the ninth book in the international best-selling Ranger's Apprentice series by John Flanagan. It was released on 2 November 2009 in Australia.

== Plot ==
Halt, Will, and Horace discover that Tennyson, the leader of a fake religious cult called the Outsiders, and his followers have fled to Picta, a country to the north of Araluen and home of the Scotti, with the assistance of a smuggler named Black O'Malley. The three follow their trail and discover that Tennyson is heading toward Araluen. Tennyson's plan is to travel to an outlying Araluen village where he has already established influence to reinvigorate his movement. The trio continue to follow Tennyson through Picta and foil some Scotti raiders along the way. As the three catch up to Tennyson, they engage with the remaining two of his hired Genovesan assassins. Halt and Will manage to kill one, but the other injures Halt and escapes uninjured.

After a while, the wound is discovered to be poisoned by a hallucinogen which is slowly killing Halt. In desperation Will decides to seek the healer Malcolm and brings him to help. Malcolm explains that the poison has two possible sources with conflicting cures, and that administering the wrong cure will kill Halt. Will and Horace realise that the remaining assassin has been returning frequently to check on Halt's condition, and formulate a plan to capture him and force him to identify the poison by piercing him with his own arrow and promising the antidote if he tells them the origin poison. After being cured alongside Halt, the assassin attempts to escape but is killed by Will.

With Halt healthy once more, the group, now with Malcolm accompanying them, continue to trail Tennyson. They find Tennyson in catacombs near a village where he is preaching to the followers of his religion. Halt successfully discredits him with Malcolm's help. Halt tells all Araluens to leave before Will uses some dirt-bombs to cause the room to shake. In the chaos that follows, the cave system collapses on top of Tennyson, many of the Outsiders and all their gold. Halt, Will and Horace and Malcolm escape, and escort Malcolm back to his home in Grimsdell Wood. Once there, Will's friend Trobar gives Will a puppy, Ebony, the daughter of the dog Shadow which Will gave to Trobar in The Siege of Macindaw. After separating from Malcolm, the trio head home, with Will and Halt going to Redmont and reuniting with Pauline and Alyss while Horace heads to Castle Araluen.

== Publication history ==
After the novel's initial publication by Random House in Australia in 2009 it was reprinted by Corgi Books in the UK in 2011.

It was also translated into Dutch, Czech and Danish in 2010; Portuguese in 2011; German and Turkish in 2012; Polish in 2013; Swedish in 2014; French and Lithuanian in 2016; and Japanese in 2018.

== Critical reception ==
Carolyn Phelan in The Booklist (Chicago) called the book "A fine addition to a popular series" and continued: "Series fans will enjoy the dialogue and camaraderie as much as the action."
