= The Lost Stories =

Book by John Flanagan

- Australian front cover of The Lost Stories
- Author: John Flanagan
- Illustrator: Jeremy Reston
- Language: English
- Series: Ranger's Apprentice (book no. 11)
- Genre: Fantasy, Adventure
- Publisher: Random House (AUS & NZ); Gottmer (NL)
- Publication date: 3 October 2011 (AUS); 7 October 2011 (NZ); 15 February 2012 (NL)
- Publication place: Australia
- Media type: Print (Paperback); E-book
- Pages: 422
- ISBN: 978-1-86471-818-8
- OCLC: 724025032
- Dewey Decimal: A823.4
- Preceded by: The Emperor of Nihon-Ja
- Followed by: The Royal Ranger: A New Beginning (Ranger's Apprentice: The Royal Ranger)

The Lost Stories is the eleventh and penultimate book in the series Ranger's Apprentice by Australian author John Flanagan. It is a collection of "lost" tales that fill in the gaps between novels.

The book was released in Australia on 3 October 2011 and in New Zealand on 7 October 2011. It is available in many languages, including Czech, Korean, and Dutch.

== Plot ==
The book begins with a scene many years in the future. A professor named Giles MacFarlane is overseeing an archaeological expedition when his assistant, Audrey, finds a little house in an area which is outside the village limits. Inside, Professor MacFarlane finds stories that tell what happens to the Rangers after they return from Nihon-Ja. In the chronicles, Gilan battles several thieves who are trying to kill Jenny, Will's hideous speech ignites a purple fire as he fights a moondarker, Evanlyn and Horace are married and at the end of the book Will and Alyss are married as well.

== Synopsis ==
=== Foreword ===
In the Republic of Aralan States (formerly the medieval Kingdom of Araluen), in Redman County, the archeologist Professor Giles MacFarlane and his team have excavated the remains of the famous triangular Castle Redmont. He hoped to find proof of the legendary Rangers Corps’ existence. In their third season on the site, a spry, energetic university volunteer named Audrey came across the remains of Will Treaty's cabin in the woods. There MacFarlane found a chest containing the Lost Stories of Araluen, chronicling what happened to Will, Halt and the rest after they returned from Nihon-Ja, giving the Professor the proof he was after. He then proceeds to read them.

=== Death of a Hero ===
Will Treaty, after gathering local gossip, returns to his little cabin in the woods to find Halt, his mentor and friend, waiting there for him. After coffee, Halt hesitantly tells Will a tale of his parents from immediately after the battle at Hackham Heath against Morgarath's army: upon losing that battle, Morgarath did not surrender, preferring instead to keep throwing his troops at the Kingdom's forces to cause as many losses as possible. In one of the skirmishes Halt steps up to take command of a failing flank. He notices that the Araluen line might collapse before he arrives on the front lines. He therefore stops at the back to empty his quiver of arrows into the enemy's front line, halting their advance. Halt rallies the Araluen troops but gets knocked to the ground by a club, stunned. A sergeant takes the lead, standing over Halt and then leading the charge to win the skirmish, all while enduring multiple wounds. As the sergeant lies dying on the ground, he tells Halt that his name is Daniel and that Halt should promise to take care of his wife and baby, which he does. Waking up in a healer's tent, Halt immediately sets off to find out where Daniel lived. He learns that two cheats, Kord and Jerrel, might know where Daniel lived as they asked for people's homes before playing. Halt, undercover as a soldier named Arratay, joins the gambler's tent. After pretending to imbibe copious amounts of drink, letting slip that there might be another arduous campaign and pretending to fall asleep, Halt overhears the two planning to desert the army and pillage Daniel's home first as it was the closest. Halt follows the deserters for a day and half, finally arriving at Daniel's farm. The farm was on fire and Kord and Jerrel were terrorizing the widow and her child. Halt intervenes, stabbing Kord but upon confronting Jerrel, Kord, as a last act, trips Halt. Daniel's widow jumps on Jerrel, who was about to kill Halt, saving his life but giving up hers in the process. Halt dispatches Jerrel and promises the dying woman that he would take care of the baby, whose name she reveals to be Will. After burying the woman and leaving the thieves to the crows, Halt takes Will to the Ward, an orphanage at Redmont Fief for those whose parents died in service. Halt reveals to the now grown Will that he hadn’t told him until this point because he was afraid Will would blame him as he viewed Will's parents’ deaths as his fault but Will comforts Halt, claiming Halt gave him the chance for a new family.

=== The Inkwell and the Dagger ===
While Halt leaves to rescue Will and Princess Evanlyn from Skandia in The Icebound Land, Gilan returns to Castle Araluen. Ranger Commandant Crowley tasks Gilan with finding Foldar, a pitiless, thieving murderer, among all the fake Foldars who took on the notorious name to terrorize victims. Gilan narrows down suspicious cases until he finds a bloody and large-scale robbery that occurred in Highcliff Fief, which had also been missing its local Ranger. Upon arriving at Castle Highcliff, Gilan meets the seneschal, Philip, who acts a little guiltily. Baron Douglas, however was a plump and emphatic pomposity. At a tavern, Gilan meets the young widowed barker, Maeve, who informs him that Philip had racked up high gambling debts. She also thinks she saw Philip heading towards Ambrose Turner's house, the man to whom he owed the most. On his way back to the castle, Gilan is ambushed by two crossbowmen. He dodges the bolts by dropping off his horse and then conceals himself in his Ranger's cloak, which can render a still wearer nigh on invisible because of its mottling. Lying still and silent on the ground, he overhears the men talking with someone they call Lord Foldar and Gilan realizes that only two people knew his true purpose in coming to Highcliff and could have informed Foldar of his plans. That night Gilan follows Philip from a large house in the village to the treasury stronghold next to his quarters, in which Philip places a sack of money. The next day Gilan explains the trap planned for Foldar to Baron Douglas. Gilan would go out with a small, empty wagon and then the normal wagon would leave carrying the tax money. This way, Foldar might think the money would be in the small wagon and that the normal wagon was a decoy. Gilan also orders the commander of local archers to conceal six archers in a copse along the tax route. As the normal wagon approaches the trees, Foldar sends a small ambush to draw off the escort and then attacks with a larger force. However, the archers fend him off and Gilan gives chase. Gilan slays Foldar in the ensuing sword fight. Gilan explained that at night, he had switched the tax money again to the small wagon because he knew the informant would tell Foldar of the original plan. Gilan reveals that the Baron was in league with Foldar, while Philip on his late night trips had just been working to repay the fief's treasury from which he had paid off his debts.

=== The Roamers ===
Halt and Will apprehend a group of river pirates who had been killing and pillaging river trade boats. They had concealed themselves aboard trade boats for four days and then stopped the attack when the pirates finally showed themselves, relying on their infamous reputation as Rangers as much as their skills to stop the attack. As the two Rangers return to their cabin in the woods, a castle Courier, Alyss, Will's unwitting crush, frantically gallops up and informs Will that Ebony, his dog, went missing three days prior. Will realizes that Roamers, migrant performers and musicians who travel in familial bands and in whose wake missing things follow, probably took Ebony. Halt suggests Will and Alyss go together because a woman is less suspicious to the Roamers than a strapping young man and that the two go as fast as possible because the Roamers liked staging dog fights. Will and Alyss, disguised as simple country folk track the Roamers for a two days, stopping one night in barn where they receive another warning of the dangers of leaving a dog with the Roamers. On day three, the pair catch up to the Roamers and do some reconnoitering that night. They deduce from a conversation in a tavern that there would be a dog fight in another couple days. Spying on the Roamers again, Alyss devises a plan to take the place of an old servant woman name Hilde, disguising herself to look like the hag. Will made sure that Alyss' disguise held, before taking the old woman to the nearby village and helping her make a new life at a friend's restaurant. Alyss follows two of the Roamers, Petulengo and Jerome, as they head out to the woods, assumably to feed the dogs meant for fighting. Alyss ends up being called to help move the dogs. She finds Ebony there, but is attacked by a vicious dog that Jerome lost control of. Will shoots it before it can hurt Alyss, but it doesn't die and it kills Jerome when he falls over it. Returning to the Roamer camp, Will gives them a dire warning to leave the kingdom and they obey.

=== Purple Prose ===
Will reviews a speech for the royal wedding of the knight Horace and Princess Evanlyn, two of his closest friends, in front Halt and his wife Pauline, the head Courier. They conclude it is a bit pompous and florid in language, although Will is very fond of it. Halt informs Will of a mission to stop a group of moondarkers, shipwrecking gangs who lure boats onto dangerous coastlines and the steal the cargo, who had been moving up the coast. Will and Halt arrive at a coastal village, where they find the moondarker's camp, do some scouting and devise a plan of action. When a ship is spotted on the horizon, Halt alerts the village guards and Will changes the color of the beacon fire that the moondarkers set up to lure in ships. The moondarkers are arrested, but Will's speech is accidentally tossed in the beacon fire, much to his dismay. Halt draws out of Will the true message he wanted to tell his friends and both Will and Halt are happier with the result.

=== Dinner for Five ===
Jenny, the owner of the restaurant to which Will had sent Hilde in "The Roamers", is preparing her home for a romantic dinner for two with the handsome Ranger Gilan. At the same time, three robbers break into Ambrose (the goldsmith)'s safe box, which held the jewels and ingots of the goldsmith’s trade. The three robbers enter Jenny's house, thinking she would be at her restaurant, but recover quickly and restrain her. Gilan arrives at the Keep of Baron Arald, the Baron of Redmont Fief, where a watchman tells Gilan and the Baron about the robbery. The thieves in Jenny's home learn that Gilan would be stopping by and realize they must eliminate both the Ranger and Jenny in order to pull off the heist. With her womanly protectiveness kicking in, Jenny manages to disable two of the robbers but the third makes it out the door. However, he runs straight into Gilan, who apprehends the thieves and then soothes Jenny, who was crying because their dinner had been ruined.

=== The Bridal Dance ===
As preparations for Horace and Evanlyn's wedding commence, a series of mishaps befall Castle Redmont. Will investigates the accidents and comes up with Robard, the assistant steward who was recently demoted. In a meeting with Will, Robard admits to the crimes, but doesn’t give up everything. The next day, Robard is discovered dead - what seemed like suicide by poison - with a piece of paper with two names on it the only suspicious thing in the room. Following the names around town, Will discovers they were aliases and the men to whom those names belonged were probably Genovesan assassins. Talking it over with Halt, the two Rangers conclude that there is a distinct danger because King Duncan and royal dignitaries from other countries would be coming to Redmont very soon for Horace and Princess Evanlyn's wedding. A new piece of evidence came to light from Robard's room, but Will could make neither heads nor tails of it. The day of the wedding arrived and as Will gave his speech (albeit unwritten and unprepared because of the story "Purple Prose"), he realized that there was a gallery above the dance hall where assassins would have a perfect window of opportunity to strike. Gathering a Skandian friend, Nils, Will hurried up the steps leading to the gallery. There, he and Nils overcame two assassins in the nick of time and Will just barely made it back in time for a dance with his sweetheart Alyss, who would have murdered him for missing the dance. As it was, she gave him a dire warning not to miss their wedding dance, when Will finally proposed (happens later).

=== The Hibernian ===
Many years earlier, in Gorlan Fief, a young Crowley stops by a tavern on his return journey to Hogarth Fief. There he confronts three drunken, rowdy soldiers who he subdues with the help of a Hibernian - the younger Halt. Crowley and Halt immediately hit it off and Halt decides to travel with Crowley, who discovers that they shared the same mentor, the Ranger Pritchard. They go to report the soldiers to their Baron, Baron Morgarath (before Morgarath decided to rebel against the kingdom). Morgarath made a bad impression on Halt and so when Morgarath tried to recruit him, Halt promptly turned the Baron down, in his classic curt manner. After parting ways, Halt once again assists Crowley by riding to his rescue as Crowley is cornered by five of Morgarath's soldiers. Crowley then convinces Halt to join him as he goes to find the then-Prince Duncan and reform the Ranger Corps from the bedraggled, corrupted group it was.

=== The Wolf ===
When a huge, renegade wolf attacks a young child, Will is called to deal with the menace. The wolf attacks Tug, Will's horse and best friend, as Will and Tug are tracking it, tearing a large gash in Tug's shoulder. Will manages to kill the beast before it does any more damage to Tug. Calling Old Bob, the horse breeder for the Ranger Corps, to take a look at the wound, Will learns that Tug will never fully recover. Will must retire Tug to Old Bob's Ranger horse ranch, where the lineage of all the Ranger horse breeds are preserved and bred for. He receives a new horse, who takes on the name Tug and acts almost like the old Tug, while the old Tug becomes Bellerophon and joins the breeding program.

=== And About Time Too... ===
Finally, at long last, Will and Alyss are married, with Horace as best man, Tug as best horse, and Ebony as best dog. Halt tries to hold it together but finally breaks down and cries as he finally sees his once before apprentice getting married.

=== Afterword ===
The final fragment in the collection of stories that were contained in the chest puzzled Professor Macfarlane, as they referred to a legend even more singular than the Ranger Corps: the Brotherband - led by a boy who was half Araluen and half Skandian and who had revolutionized the design of the Skandian wolfship.
