= Consolation (novel) =

Crime novel by Australian writer Garry Disher

- Author: Garry Disher
- Language: English
- Genre: Fiction
- Publisher: Text Publishing, Australia
- Publication date: 2020
- Publication place: Australia
- Media type: Print
- Pages: 336 pp
- ISBN: 9781922330260
- Preceded by: Peace
- Followed by: Day's End

Consolation (2020) is a crime novel by Australian writer Garry Disher. It was the third novel to feature his recurring character Paul "Hirsch" Hirschhausen.

It won the 2021 Ned Kelly Award for Best Fiction, and was shortlisted for the 2021 Colin Roderick Award

== Abstract ==
Winter in Tiverton.

Constable Paul Hirschhausen has a snowdropper on his patch. Someone is stealing women's underwear, and Hirsch knows enough about that kind of crime—how it can escalate—not to take it lightly.

But the more immediate concern is a high school teacher worried about one of the students.

A little girl in danger. A family on the edge. An absent father who isn't where he's supposed to be.

The cold, seeping feeling something is very, very wrong. (Publication summary)

== Critical reception ==
Tony Birch wrote in Australian Book Review: "Disher's crime novels, as with other fine books in the genre, are about much more than criminality. He is a writer with an acute sociological sensibility. The ensemble cast of Tiverton and the surrounding countryside represent a microcosm of rural life. Some people in the town are loving. Others are funny, dry, or eccentric. As a member of the community, Hirsch is expected not only to hunt down criminals but also to work on his singing voice for a local performance. As a result, while the plot never stalls, it isn’t driven at the breakneck speed of some crime fictions. Consequently, the story is better served."

Karen Chisholm in The Newtown Review of Books noted some major points of the novel: "As always with Disher, the sense of place in Consolation is incredibly strong. It is set not among the bushfires and dust of a typical dryland farming summer, but the bone-chilling cold and mud of a wet winter. The little touches, like the city cops being pulled out of a bog by an taciturn elderly lady on a tractor, are beautifully written, and when Hirsch needs to be pulled out of the same bog, it's unexpectedly funny. It came as a bit of a surprise to find myself smiling and even laughing at quite a few points in this novel – it's not something I expect with rural noir of this kind, and it was welcome and very fitting."

== Publication history ==
After its original publication in 2020 by Text Publishing, the novel was reprinted by Text in 2021, and then published as follows:

- Viper, UK, 2021
- Unionsverlag, Germany, 2021 (translated into German with the title Barrier Highway)
- Vesta, Estonia, 2022 (translated into Estonian with the title Lohutus)

== See also ==
- 2020 in Australian literature
