= Blackwattle Creek =

Book by Geoffrey McGeachin

- Author: Geoffrey McGeachin
- Language: English
- Series: Charlie Berlin
- Genre: Crime novel
- Publisher: Viking Books, Australia
- Publication date: 2012
- Publication place: Australia
- Media type: Print (Paperback)
- Pages: 281
- ISBN: 9780670075881
- Preceded by: The Diggers Rest Hotel
- Followed by: St Kilda Blues

Blackwattle Creek (2012) is a crime novel by Australian author Geoffrey McGeachin. It is the second in the author's Charlie Berlin mystery series and won the 2013 Ned Kelly Award.

== Plot summary ==
Ten years after the events of the first book in the series, The Diggers Rest Hotel, Charlie Berlin is now married and living in Melbourne. His innocent investigations to strange goings-on at a funeral parlour for a friend, leads him to Blackwattle Creek, a former asylum for the criminally insane, to Cold War paranoia and corrupt policemen.

== Reviews ==
Fair Dinkum Crime thought the novel to be a "ripper of a yarn" and that the author "has excelled at drawing out the small details of life that depict a time and place to perfection". In The Guardian, Andrew Nette found a dark, "unsettling yarn" and was "genuinely interested to know where McGeachin is going to take Berlin next".

== Awards and nominations ==
- 2013 winner Ned Kelly Award – Best Novel
