= Geoffrey McGeachin =

Australian photographer and author

- Born: 1949 (age 76–77); Melbourne, Victoria
- Writing career
- Language: English
- Years active: 2004-
- Notable work: The Diggers Rest Hotel
- Notable awards: Ned Kelly Awards for Crime Writing 2011, 2013

Geoffrey McGeachin (born 1949 in Melbourne, Victoria) is an Australian photographer and author of crime fiction. He spent a period of time in the US in the 1970s as a commercial photographer, before returning to Melbourne where he now lives.

McGeachin is one of only four writers who have won the Best Novel category at the Ned Kelly Awards on multiple occasions; the others being Garry Disher, Michael Robotham and Peter Temple.

== Awards ==
- 2011, Ned Kelly Awards for Crime Writing, Best Novel: winner for The Diggers Rest Hotel
- 2013, Ned Kelly Awards for Crime Writing, Best Novel: winner for Blackwattle Creek

Note: references are provided on the individual Award pages.

== Bibliography ==
=== Novels ===
Standalone works

- Fat, Fifty and F**ked! (2004)

Alby Murdoch series

A humorous spy thriller series, focusing on Australian special agent Alby Murdoch.

- D-E-D Dead! (2005)
- Sensitive New Age Spy (2007)
- Dead and Kicking (2009)

Charlie Berlin series

Focuses on police officer and WWII veteran Charlie Berlin. Each book is set a decade apart, with the first novel being set in 1947, and the third in 1967.

- The Diggers Rest Hotel (2010)
- Blackwattle Creek (2012)
- St Kilda Blues (2014)
