= The Bamboo Flute =

Book by Garry Disher

- First edition
- Author: Garry Disher
- Language: English
- Genre: Children's novel
- Published: 1992 (Angus & Robertson)
- Publication place: Australia
- Media type: Print (paperback)
- Pages: 88
- ISBN: 0395665957
- OCLC: 27186376

The Bamboo Flute is a 1992 children's novel by Garry Disher. Set during the depression, it is about a boy who is taught by a swagman to make and play a bamboo flute.

== Reception ==
In a review of The Bamboo Flute, Booklist wrote "The author's thesis—aesthetic beauty is a basic need, especially during times of extreme hardship—will not escape the notice of young audiences, and the frequent touches of local color make this a fine choice for reading aloud and for classes studying Australia." Kirkus Reviews described it as "a beautifully written novella" that is "Brief and easily read, a powerfully realized moment in Australia's past." Publishers Weekly wrote "From its exquisite opening line ("There was once music in our lives, but I can feel it slipping away") to the moving finale, this elegantly delineated tale never strikes a false note." and "Disher's spare, evocative, emotionally charged coming-of-age story is reminiscent in style to the work of Paul Fleischman, but his voice is wholly his own, musical and haunting."

It received the 1993 CBCA Book of the Year: Younger Readers Award, and a 1994 International Board on Books for Young People (IBBY) Australia honour.
