= The Icebound Land =

Book by John Flanagan

- Second Australian edition cover of The Icebound Land
- Author: John Flanagan
- Language: English
- Series: Ranger's Apprentice (Book no. 3)
- Genre: Fantasy, Adventure
- Publisher: Random House (Australia)
- Publication date: 30 November 2005 (Aus)
- Publication place: Australia
- Media type: Print (Paperback)
- Pages: 307
- ISBN: 1-74166-021-1
- OCLC: 62866767
- Dewey Decimal: A823.4
- Preceded by: The Burning Bridge
- Followed by: Oakleaf Bearers

The Icebound Land is the third book in the Ranger's Apprentice book series written by Australian author John Flanagan. The book was released on 30 November 2005 in Australia.

== Plot summary ==
Will, the main character and a Ranger's apprentice, is captured by the Skandians along with his friend, Evanlyn (Araluen's Crown Princess Cassandra in disguise), in a big war in the previous book, The Burning Bridge. The capturer, Jarl (war officer) Erak of the Skandians (mercenaries), takes them in as slaves.

Meanwhile, Will's mentor, Halt (a legendary Ranger), has sworn to save him from the Skandians, but the Ranger Corps forces him to stay back. Halt, however, is so desperate, he insults the King of his country, Araluen. The King and Halt are good friends, so in Halt's trial, the King takes pity on Halt. Instead of the normal punishment, which is to ban the defendant from the borders of Araluen forever, he banishes Halt from the borders only for a twelvemonth. Halt is banished from the Ranger Corps until the punishment is lifted, but that is just a minor problem for Halt. He then sets out to find his apprentice once more. Halt is determined to get to Skandia quickly, so he takes the quickest route: Gallica. There he meets Will's old friend, Horace. Horace is Will's childhood friend, and just like Will, Horace is an orphan. In Gallica, Horace and Halt tried to go as fast as they could, but they were stopped by a lot of inexperienced knights, as Gallica is in a state of anarchy and turmoil. Horace, being a warrior apprentice, takes on the fake name "The Oakleaf Knight". Horace beats all of them with ease without his grizzled companion, Halt, to step in. Horace's reputation grows until he is noticed throughout Gallica, which attracts the horrible knight, Deparnieux of Castle Montsombre. Deparnieux soon captures Horace and Halt, and holds them in his keep.

Meanwhile, when Jarl Erak, Will, and Evanlyn soon arrive in Skandia, Will and Evanlyn become slaves. Over the journey the Jarl had become quite attached to the two slaves and thinks they should be treated more respectfully than the normal slave should be treated. This goes for Evanlyn, which gets to work in the kitchen, but Will unfortunately gets the job of working the yard, the deadliest place for slaves to work. Will soon gets the attention from the older crowds, and one of them tricks him to get addicted to a deadly drug, warmweed.

Erak soon sees this and can't stand it. Will has been put into a daze, and doesn't remember anyone, including himself. He only responds to orders, which he does in an obedient manner. Erak and Evanlyn soon devise a plan to escape. Throughout Evanlyn and Will's journey to freedom, Evanlyn weans Will off the drug by slowly reducing the amount of warmweed given to Will. Evanlyn eventually arrives with Will at a mountain cabin, where they take shelter. While hunting with her sling, Evanlyn watches a rider dressed in furs on a horse. Will regains his old self as Evanlyn returns to the cabin, to Cassandra's great delight and relief. The book ends with Halt and Horace watching an "accidental" fire in Castle Montsombre, which Halt predicts will destroy the tower.

== Critical reception ==
The Icebound Land was well received by reviewers. One review praised the fact that although Will is talented, he is not afraid to ask others for help when needed. The same reviewer also praised how, "the action is well paced and the writing style is engaging." On another review for the audiobook version, the vivid imagery was noted on how it provides great detail for the battle scenes. The review also praised the speaker John Keating, makes the production entertaining, and the cliffhanging conclusion is sure to have fantasy fans hoping for another instalment.
