= Editora Fundamento =

Brazilian book publisher

Editora Fundamento Ltda.
- Company type: Private
- Industry: Publishing; Printing
- Headquarters: Curitiba, PR, Brazil
- Products: Books
- Website: www.editorafundamento.com.br

Editora Fundamento is a Brazilian book publisher located in Curitiba, Paraná.

The first book titles released by this publishing house were all literature for children and young adults. However, after some time of successful presence in the Brazilian publishing market Editora Fundamento began expanding into other areas of interest acquiring copyrights to both national and foreign works.

All titles in the Editora Fundamento catalog are published in Portuguese; many of which are translations from English and from other languages.

== Some of the titles published ==
- Rangers: Ordem dos Arqueiros - John Flanagan
- Brotherband - John Flanagan
- Deltora Quest - Emily Rodda
- As Chaves do Reino - Garth Nix
- Amanhã - John Marsden
- Querido Diário Otário - Jim Benton
- A Menina Que Era Outra Vez - Sergio Klein
- Spy Dog - Andrew Cope
- Bilboquê, Que Bicho é Esse? - Sergio Klein
- Uma Breve História do Mundo - Geoffrey Blainey
- Uma Breve História do Século XX - Geoffrey Blainey
- Goosebumps - Robert Lawrence Stine
- Midnight in Peking - Paul French

== See also ==
- Companhia das Letras
- Editora Abril
- Editora Globo
