= The Emperor of Nihon-Ja =

Book by John Flanagan

- Australian cover of The Emperor of Nihon-Ja
- Author: John Flanagan
- Illustrator: Jeremy Reston
- Language: English
- Series: Ranger's Apprentice (Book no. 10)
- Genre: Fantasy, Adventure
- Publisher: Random House (AUS & NZ)
- Publication date: 1 November 2010 (AUS); 5 November 2010 (NZ); 16 April 2011 (US)
- Publication place: Australia
- Media type: Paperback
- Pages: 590
- ISBN: 978-1-74166-448-5
- OCLC: 643653680
- Dewey Decimal: A823.4
- Preceded by: Halt's Peril
- Followed by: The Lost Stories

The Emperor of Nihon-Ja is the tenth installment of the Ranger's Apprentice book series by Australian author John Flanagan. The book was released in Australia on 1 November 2010, in New Zealand on 5 November 2010, and in the United States on 16 April 2011. The name Nihon-Ja is based on the name of Japan, Nihon-Koku.

== Plot ==
Arnaut(Horace) has gone missing. Months have passed since he was sent on a military mission to the court of the Emperor of Nihon-Ja with his friend, former wardmate and Scribeschool apprentice George, but he has failed to return. Meanwhile, Halt, Will, Selethen (the leader of the Arridi) and Alyss (a Courier and Will's love interest) are in Toscana overseeing a demonstration using tight formations to overcome more skilled opponents and aid in the completion of a treaty between Arrida and Toscana. When Crown Princess Cassandra arrives notifying everyone of Horace's absence, the Araluens and Selethen embark on a Skandian duty ship to find Arnaut.

They find that Arnaut has become embroiled in Nihon-Ja's politics. An arrogant Senshi warlord known as Arisaka, a member of the Nihon-Ja warrior class, has rebelled against the rightful Emperor Shigeru out of fear that he will usurp the Senshi's influence in the country and due to his belief that it was he who should have been named Emperor when the previous one died instead of Shigeru. He has convinced the Senshi of his clan, the Shimonseki Clan, and another, the Umaki Clan, to join him in his coup, manipulating them into believing that Shigeru's actions violate his oath as a Senshi. Shigeru, though a Senshi himself, is also a man of the people and has been trying to reform his nation's strict social system, which Arisaka argues to be a betrayal of his class. Arisaka's men have seized the capital of Ito and slaughtered and scattered most of Shigeru's Clan, while the remaining clans, who are without the strength to face the Shimonseki and Umaki due to their reputed strength as the two strongest clans in Nihon-Ja, are remaining silent and claim that if Arisaka's claim is to be believed, then perhaps his cause is justified. Horace has chosen to stay and lend support to the deposed ruler. Pursued by the rebel leader and master swordsman Arisaka, Horace and Shigeru flee along with Shigeru's cousin and guard Shukin and a small force of Senshi from Shigeru's Clan. Their only hope is to find the fabled fortress of Ran-Koshi, which is mentioned in a legend and said to have impossibly high walls. The three lead their small entourage of 50 Senshi around the native villages recruiting the Kikori, lumberjacks native to the area who have long been abused and looked-down up by the Senshi but are fiercely loyal to the Emperor.

After recruiting, the men flee helplessly from Arisaka and his much larger army of Senshi followers. However, the Emperor's party is moving slowly because they are burdened down by their injured, and are easily caught up to. In an effort to buy them more time, Shukin and nine other Senshi volunteer to stay back at a river and duel the enemy until they are killed. From a cliff, Shigeru watches as Arisaka kills his cousin in combat and continues the pursuit. Shortly after, they come to a precipice crossed only by a rickety footbridge and quickly cross. However, as the last men are crossing, Arisaka's army arrives. Horace has a rope tied around his waist and goes back onto the bridge to defend it while the heavy ropes are being cut. When it falls, Horace is thrown against the cliff and as a result, drops his sword into the precipice below. Shigeru later presents a gift to the knight, a perfect copy of his blade but forged with the strong Nihon-Jan steel. With the enemy army stuck on the other side of the precipice, the party is free to carry on to Ran-Koshi.

When they arrive, they discover that the legendary fortress is a valley between high cliffs, defended by a palisade at its narrow opening. The men set up camp, and the Kikori begin refurbishing the fortress as more numbers join from the surrounding villages. After they arrive, the heavy snows of the Nihon-Jan winter come in, giving the men time to prepare while Arisaka is further hindered. Soon, though Ran-Koshi has been transformed into a full military fortress, but the Emperor still only has 50 Senshi and 200 untrained Kikori for an army. Unbeknown to them, Cassandra's party has arrived and begin their search for Horace, and are found by Kikori scouts and brought out to Ran-Koshi. Horace welcomes his old friends and informs them of the situation.

The problem reminds Will of the Toscan military demonstration, and he and Selethen begin training men to use the tortoise formation. They form four units of 50 men, heavily trained formations of men armed with large wooden shields, short swords, and javelins. Meanwhile, Alyss and Cassandra embark on a journey across a large mountain lake to find a mythical people called the Hasanu, who are intensely loyal to their lord, an honorable man by the name of Lord Nimatsu, who is in turn faithful to Shigeru. When they arrive on the other side, they make contact and find that the Hasanu are large mountain people covered in thick, reddish fur. After learning of Shigeru's plight, Nimatsu insists that he wishes help, but the way is blocked by a forest haunted by a demon that has killed 17 Hasanu. He further reveals that by asking the Hasanu to cross the forest, which they will refuse, he will humiliate and dishonour them and therefore he refuses to do so. Thus, Alyss and Cassandra set out to kill the demon, and discover that it is a giant snow tiger. After killing it, they bring it back and disperse the Hasanu's fears, and they soon make preparations march for Ran-Koshi as the two girls finally come to understand one another and become friends.

When spring comes, Arisaka's army arrives and camps at the bottom of a nearby valley. However, they are now much larger due to reinforcements from the south. Shigeru, Horace, Halt, Will and Selethen know that they are heavily outnumbered, but they prepare for battle to confront Arisaka. They prepare their formations on the plain outside Ran-Koshi, and kill hundreds of Arisaka's infantry. Just as they are about to engage again, however, another army arrives, bringing hundreds more to Arisaka's aid under Yamada, a Senshi lord loyal to Shigeru who has been deceived into supporting the rebel lord under the Arisaka's claim that an impostor has replaced Shigeru. As the enemy forces arrive, so do the Hasanu with three thousand fierce warriors. The Emperor meets with Arisaka, Lord Yamada and an unnamed lieutenant; and, as Yamada grows unsure of whom to believe, Arisaka's lieutenant attempts to kill Shigeru, only to be shot by Will. Arisaka then unintentionally reveals his lies in front of Yamada, who, along with his men, turns against the rebel Senshi lord, leaving Arisaka with only his own men, namely the warriors of the Shimonseki. Arisaka prepares to fight to the end, but Shigeru stops the battle, and says that he will give up his position as emperor if it will save hundreds of his people dying and leaving the choice of who will replace him in the care of nobles like Yamanda and Nimatsu. Arisaka's army, awed by Shigeru's display, desert their lord, beginning with a minor Shimonseki leader named Matsuda Sato who begins chanting the Emperor's name. The chant gradually spreads to all Arisaka's warriors, who take up the call and throw down their weapons. Enraged, Arisaka strikes down Matsuda which shocks his soldiers, who Arisaka slanders as cowards and traitors who have defiled his honour, only to be told by Will that he has no honor. As Arisaka charges the young Ranger, blinded with hate, Will hurls a saxe knife at his neck, killing him.

With the battle won, Shigeru returns to his position as Emperor to restabilize Nihon-Ja. Shigeru gives Horace a painting with which to remember him by, and they head back to Araluen. In the end, Horace and Cassandra become engaged, and Will mentions to Alyss that they should do the same.
