= Ranger's Apprentice =

Series of fantasy novels by John Flanagan

- The Ruins of Gorlan; The Burning Bridge; The Icebound Land; Oakleaf Bearers (also known as The Battle For Skandia); The Sorcerer in the North; The Siege of Macindaw; Erak's Ransom; The Kings of Clonmel; Halt's Peril; The Emperor of Nihon-Ja; The Lost Stories; The Royal Ranger (also published as A New Beginning)
- Author: John Flanagan
- Country: Australia
- Language: English
- Genre: Fantasy, Adventure
- Publisher: Random House (AUS & NZ); Philomel (US & CAN); Yearling Books (UK); Beyaz Balina (TUR); Gottmer Uitgeverij (NL); Editora Fundamento (BR); B. Wahlströms Bokförlag (SE)
- Published: 1 November 2004 – 3 October 2011
- Media type: Print (paperback and hardcover); e-book
- No. of books: 17 and a Novella
- Preceded by: The Battle of Hackham Heath (Ranger's Apprentice: The Early Years)
- Followed by: The Outcasts (Brotherband); A New Beginning (Ranger's Apprentice: The Royal Ranger)

Ranger's Apprentice is a series written by Australian author John Flanagan. It began as twenty short stories Flanagan wrote for his son to get him interested in reading. Ten years later, Flanagan found the stories again and decided to turn them into a book, which became the first novel in the series, The Ruins of Gorlan. It was originally released in Australia on 1 November 2004. Though the books were initially published only in Australia and New Zealand, they have since been released in 14 other countries.

The series follows the adventures of Will, an orphan, who is chosen as an apprentice Ranger, one of the skilled trackers, archers, and warriors in the service of the King of Araluen. Will strives to keep the Kingdom of Araluen safe from invaders, traitors, and other threats. He is joined on his adventures by his mentor, Halt, and his best friend Horace.

The series originally consisted of twelve books, with the eleventh book being a collection of short stories and the twelfth being a follow-up novel set 16 years later. A prequel series, Ranger's Apprentice: The Early Years, has released two titles, the first in 2015 and the second in 2016. A spin-off series started in 2011, The Brotherband Chronicles, is set in the same universe, though with new characters. The eighth book in The Brotherband Chronicles came out in October 2019. In 2018, the twelfth book of the Ranger's Apprentice series was renamed and made the first book in a sequel series, Ranger's Apprentice: The Royal Ranger.

The series has sold over three million copies and is well praised by critics.

== Plot ==
=== The Ruins of Gorlan ===
Morgarath, an exiled baron, has been waiting fifteen years, carefully planning his revenge against the Kingdom of Araluen. He prepares to unleash his power and attempt again to take control of the kingdom. In Redmont Fief, a special day has come for 15-year-old Will and his fellow wardmates Horace, Alyss, George, and Jenny, called Choosing Day, where they all become either an apprentice to a craftmaster or work on the local farms. Will is apprenticed to Halt the Ranger, who is part of the country's elite intelligence group. The Rangers specialize in long-range weapons and the art of staying unseen. Will begins to train in these skills.

In the meantime, Will's wardmate Horace is in Battleschool. His life is harsh and three second-year Battleschool cadets bully him. During a local holiday known as Harvest Day, Horace and Will fight, increasing their hatred for each other. However, six weeks later, Will saves Horace's life during a boar hunt, cementing a friendship between the two boys. Later, the Battleschool bullies attack Will, leading to Halt intervening and having the bullies banished from the fief. Soon after, Halt and Will leave for the Ranger Gathering, where they receive a report that the Kalkara, vicious creatures under the control of Morgarath, have reappeared in Araluen.

Halt, Will and Gilan (Halt's former apprentice, now a fully-fledged Ranger) leave to track down and kill the Kalkara. Halt thinks that the Kalkara are headed to the ruins of Gorlan. Morgarath's former castle. He tells Will to go back to Redmont, get backup, and rendezvous at the ruins. Back in Redmont, Baron Arald and Sir Rodney head out to slay the Kalkara and to save Halt. Finding that Halt is battling the Kalkara alone, Sir Rodney and Baron Arald manage to knock one of the beasts into the fire, but are badly injured by the other. Will shoots the Kalkara in the chest with a flaming arrow, which proves to be fatal. Back in his own fief, Will is considered a hero and receives his bronze oakleaf, which identifies him as a Ranger's apprentice.

=== The Burning Bridge ===
A war with Morgarath is approaching, and Will, Gilan, and Horace are sent to Celtica, a nearby country, to ask for reinforcements. But every town they travel through is deserted. They find a survivor named Evanlyn, who explains that Wargals, mindless minions of Morgarath, have caused the destruction. Gilan travels to Araluen to report to the king (King Duncan). Meanwhile, Will, Horace, and Evanlyn come across an army of Wargals. They secretly follow them to the Fissure, a deep gorge, only to discover that the Celtic miners were captured. Will and his friends watch as the miners are forced to complete a bridge across the Fissure and a tunnel through the cliffs up to Morgarath's lair. This would allow Morgarath's army to attack the Araluen king's army from behind. Will comes up with a plan to burn the bridge so that Morgarath's army cannot use it. However, in the process, Will and Evanlyn are captured by a force of Skandian warriors hired by Morgarath. Horace watches from the other side of the bridge and flees to alert King Duncan about the bridge.

After Horace arrives at the Araluen camp, he and Gilan manage to warn the king and his advisers of Morgarath's plan. In the process of talking to the king, however, it is revealed that Evanlyn is, in truth, his daughter, the missing crown princess Cassandra. Though King Duncan wants to save Cassandra, he is bound to protect his kingdom first. He dispatches an auxiliary force, led by Halt, to stop another group of Skandian warriors that have come up from the coast to outflank the king's army. This is done successfully, and Halt and his troops disguise themselves as the Skandians, tricking Morgarath into ordering the Wargals to charge into the open plain. An Araluen cavalry charge demolishes the advancing Wargals, who are afraid only of horses. His army destroyed, Morgarath offers a flag of truce and prepares to challenge Halt to single combat to avenge his own defeat. Instead, he is challenged by Horace. Though Morgarath is more experienced and skilled than Horace, the young warrior manages to kill him. Meanwhile, Will and Cassandra are held as hostages by the Skandian that have captured them.

=== The Icebound Land ===
Will and Cassandra are brought back to Skandia (a country north-east across the Stormwhite Sea) by their captors and enslaved by the Skandians. In Hallasholm, the capital, Will is forced to work outside in the bitter cold, while Cassandra is taken into the kitchens. Will is introduced to warmweed, a drug that warms the body but destroys the mind, and he quickly becomes addicted. Erak, the captain of the Skandian crew that captured them, helps Cassandra escape with Will, and the two take refuge in a small log cabin for the winter. Following Erak's advice, Cassandra weans Will off the warmweed bit by bit, and Will slowly overcomes his addiction. Meanwhile, Horace and Halt set off to rescue Will and Cassandra by crossing into the neighbouring country of Gallica and making their way north along the coast. Horace becomes known as "The Oakleaf Knight" as he defeats many Gallican knights in combat, thereby attracting the attention of the famed knight Deparnieux. Deparnieux attempts to capture Halt and Horace but is tricked by Halt and killed.

=== Oakleaf Bearers ===
In Oakleaf Bearers, called The Battle for Skandia in the United States, Cassandra is captured by a Temujai warrior while scavenging for food. The Temujai are a fierce, nomadic tribe of horse warriors from the east and are masters of the recurve bow. Will struggles to rescue her until Horace and Halt arrive. Halt captures one of the Temujai and realizes they are attempting to take over the western world, starting with the Skandians. Having tried and nearly succeeded to complete the same goal twenty years earlier, they are a dangerous group. Erak and his crew happen to find the Araluens and they decide to join forces to help drive off the Temujai, since they pose a threat to Araluen as well if they manage to overtake the Skandians. They make use of Halt's knowledge of the Temujai tactics, and Will trains a force of archers for the upcoming battle against the Temujai. During the battle, the Skandians surprise the Temujai with their archers, and they are forced to withdraw. The Skandian Oberjarl (leader) Ragnak is killed in the battle, and Erak is elected to succeed him. Cassandra, acting on behalf of her father, and Erak, acting on behalf of Skandia, sign the Treaty of Hallasholm, a defence treaty.

=== The Sorcerer in the North ===
It's been years since Will and his friends helped defend Skandia against the Temujai. After receiving his silver oakleaf and being assigned to Seacliff Fief, Will takes on his first mission as a full-fledged Ranger. A few weeks after arriving in the fief, a disguised Will is sent north to Castle Macindaw to investigate claims of sorcery. The lord of Castle Macindaw, Lord Syron, is ill and many believe a sorcerer has caused the illness. Will's friend and former wardmate Alyss, also in disguise, is sent to help him, but is captured by the rogue knight Keren who is responsible for poisoning Lord Syron. Will escapes from the castle with allies of Lord Syron, and travels into the forest to enlist the aid of the rumored sorcerer. This "sorcerer", who is in fact a gifted healer called Malcolm, agrees to help. Orman, Lord Syron's son, has also been poisoned by Keren, and is smuggled by Will to Malcolm. Will attempts to rescue Alyss, but Keren walks through the door and Will barely escapes in time.

=== The Siege of Macindaw ===
Will's friend Horace is sent to help him handle the situation at Castle Macindaw. Together, they devise a plan to take control of the castle and rescue Alyss, with the help of a group of Skandian raiders who have been stranded in Araluen. They infiltrate the castle and Will reaches the tower where Alyss is held, but Keren hypnotises with a blue stone embedded on his sword to make her to believe Will is the enemy and orders her to kill him. At the last moment, Will confesses to Alyss that he loves her, and the hypnosis is broken. As Keren attacks Will, Alyss defeats him. Meanwhile, the Skandians, led by Horace, take control of the castle. Later, Will returns to Seacliff Fief and receives a letter from Alyss with her own love confession.

=== Erak's Ransom ===
Erak's Ransom takes place after Oakleaf Bearers but before The Sorcerer in the North, several months before Will receives his Silver Oakleaf (though the book was released after The Siege of Macindaw). Skandian Oberjarl Erak decides to go on one final raid. However, he is captured and held for ransom while attempting to raid Al Shabah, a province of Arrida. Because Erak's first mate Svengal believes that he was betrayed by a rival Skandian named Toshak, the raiding party goes to Araluen instead of Skandia for the ransom money. Princess Cassandra returns with Svengal and the rest of Erak's crew to Arrida in her father's place to negotiate prices with Selethen, the leader of Al Shabah. Will, Gilan, Halt, Horace, and thirty of Erak's men go along to protect her and deliver the ransom. After the negotiation is over, Selethen reveals that Erak was being held in Mararoc, a fort in the desert, but as they are traveling there, Will loses his horse Tug during a sandstorm. Desperate to find him, Will travels alone into the desert. He runs out of water and is saved by the nomadic Bedullin tribe. While staying with the Bedullin tribe, Will finds that Tug has been found by a young man in the tribe, who claims Tug as his own. In order to win Tug back from the young man, Will has to defeat him in a horse race. He manages to win and reclaims his horse. Meanwhile, Erak is captured by the Tualaghi, a merciless nomadic tribe of devil worshipers. The rescue party, joined by Will and the Bedullin tribe, defeats the leader of the Tualaghi and frees Erak. Finally, Will is promoted to full Ranger and is awarded a silver oakleaf. He is given the last name of "Treaty" to commemorate his help in arranging the peace treaty between Skandia and Araluen years earlier.

=== The Kings of Clonmel ===
Will, Halt, and Horace are on a mission to stop a cult called the Outsiders from taking power. The cult offers protection to villages from "bandits", who are secretly other Outsiders, in exchange for gold. In this fashion, they have taken control of five of the six kingdoms of the country of Hibernia. Halt, Will, and Horace are sent to Clonmel, the last kingdom, to try to prevent the cult from expanding into Araluen. Halt, a Hibernian native, is revealed to be a member of the royal family of Clonmel, and he tries to persuade his twin brother, King Ferris of Clonmel, to use his troops to drive the cult out. The cult loses power in Clonmel, but the leader, Tennyson, escapes. At the same time, King Ferris is killed by a Genovesan assassin hired by Tennyson, and Halt's nephew Sean becomes king. Will, Halt, and Horace leave Clonmel to chase the false prophet, Tennyson.

=== Halt's Peril ===
After reaching a smuggler's port and managing to get information on Tennyson's whereabouts, the trio hires a ship to take them to Picta. The chase is on as the three pursue Tennyson through a drowned forest. Finally, in an encounter with Tennyson's hired assassins, Halt is shot with a poisoned arrow and is incapacitated. Picta is located near Macindaw, so Will rides to fetch Malcolm, the best healer in Araluen. They discover that Halt was poisoned with one of two extremely similar toxins. Both toxins have different antidotes, and to use the wrong one is fatal. Will captures the assassin that fired the arrow at Halt and forces him to reveal which toxin he used, which then allows Malcolm to cure Halt. The group finds Tennyson, who is trying to swindle more countryfolk. Using Halt's similarity to his late brother, King Ferris, they manage to discredit Tennyson. Will causes a cave-in that kills Tennyson and his followers. When they return to Araluen, Halt, Horace, and Will are given a heroes' welcome.

=== The Emperor of Nihon-Ja ===
Horace and George are in guests of the Emperor of Nihon-Ja, Shigeru. Meanwhile, Will, Halt, Selethen, and Alyss observe a Toscan general's demonstration of military tactics while at a treaty signing between the Toscans and the Arridi, both allies of Araluen. The Emperor of Nihon-Ja finds out that there's been a coup against him by Arisaka, a noble who believes he should be Emperor instead of Shigeru. A Senshi (skilled swordsman) ambushes and nearly succeeds in killing the Emperor, but Horace intervenes. He decides to help the Emperor find the legendary, impenetrable fortress of Ran-Koshi while George contacts Araluen for help. Later, the crown princess of Araluen, Cassandra, appears and enlists the help of the two Rangers, Alyss, and Selethen to go after Horace. En route to Ran-Koshi, Horace's party befriends the local woodworkers known as Kikori, and they join his group on the trek to the fortress. Halt's group arrives in Nihon-Ja and learn of Horace's whereabouts. While Shukin (the Emperor's cousin who warned him of Arisaka's coup) and other Senshi sacrifice themselves to delay Arisaka's enormous Senshi party, Horace's group reaches Ran-Koshi and settles in. Soon after, Halt's group arrives at Ran-Koshi as well.

The group sets up defenses to stop Arisaka's army, successfully repelling them. Cassandra and Alyss set out to recruit a tribe of warriors allied with the Emperor, the Hasanu. Will, noting how the Kikori work together excellently, utilizes the military tactics of the Toscan general to train them. Arisaka's main party arrives near Ran-Koshi. The final battle begins, and the armies seem evenly matched until Arisaka's reinforcements arrive. As the Kikori forces regroup, Alyss and Cassandra arrive with the Hasanu. Before the battle can continue, the Emperor calls a truce and convinces Arisaka's army that Arisaka is a power-hungry fool. Arisaka is enraged and Will directly confronts him and kills him. On the return trip to Araluen, Horace and Cassandra announce their engagement. Will makes a poor attempt at proposing to Alyss, and she marches off in mock indignation.

=== The Lost Stories ===
The Lost Stories consists of nine different short stories, set at various times before, during, and after the events of the previous ten books. It includes the tale of Will's father, what happened to Gilan during the events of The Icebound Land, the story of Halt's apprenticeship in Hibernia, and several stories following the main characters after the conclusion of The Emperor of Nihon-Ja, including one where Will and Alyss get married.

=== The Royal Ranger ===
Years after the events of the previous books, Will Treaty tries to cope with the death of his wife Alyss, who died in an inn set on fire by the gang leader Jory Ruhl. When Will's friends begin to notice the change in his personality, Gilan, the new Ranger Commandant, calls on Halt, Pauline, Cassandra, and Horace to discuss the situation. Halt suggests that Will take on an apprentice to take his mind off his quest for revenge against Jory. Meanwhile, Princess Madelyn (Maddie), the daughter of Horace and Cassandra, sneaks out at night to use her sling to hunt, against the will of her parents. Halt suggests that Maddie be apprenticed to Will, which would make Maddie the first female apprentice in Ranger history. At the beginning of her apprenticeship, Will gives Maddie a letter from her parents, which says she has been disinherited as a princess of Araluen, in a desperate last resort by her parents to get her under control. Will proceeds to train Maddie, and his quest for revenge is slowly forgotten. When Gilan suggests Will take Maddie on a mission, Will accepts.

Gilan assigns Will and Maddie to investigate the death of Liam, another Ranger. They soon discover a plot by an illicit slave ring who kidnaps children. Will learns that the leader of the slave ring is actually Jory Ruhl, but he manages to set aside his desire for revenge to save the children Ruhl has kidnapped. Maddie is injured in the process, and Will kills Ruhl to save her. Six months later, Maddie is awarded her bronze oakleaf, marking her as an official Ranger's apprentice, and Cassandra offers her reinstatement as a princess. However, Maddie declines, saying she wishes to complete her apprenticeship instead.

The Ranger's Apprentice Series
Number	Title
1	The Ruins of Gorlan
2	The Burning Bridge
3	The Icebound Land
4	The Oakleaf Bearers/The Battle for Skandia
5	The Sorcerer of the North
6	The Siege of Macindaw
7	Erak's Ransom
8	The Kings of Clonmel
9	Halt's Peril
10	The Emperor of Nihon-Ja
11	The Lost Stories
12	The Royal Ranger
13	The Red Fox Clan
14	Duel at Araluen
15	The Missing Prince
16	Escape from Falaise
17	Arazan's Wolves
18	Ambush at Sorato
The Early Years #1	The Tournament at Gorlan
The Early Years #2	The Battle at Hackham Heath
Novella	The Beast from Another Time

== Main and major characters ==
- Will Treaty

His parents are deceased—his father, Daniel, having died saving Halt's life from Wargals and his mother being murdered while defending Halt from two bandits who had attacked Will's family's farm. Will grows up as an orphan in the Ward of Castle Redmont along with Alyss, Horace, George and Jenny. After being turned away from Battleschool by Sir Rodney for his small stature, he is taken on as an apprentice by the Ranger Halt. Will is intelligent, inquisitive, and athletic, with a natural aptitude for climbing and stealth. He has brown hair that hangs unkempt around his face and deep brown eyes, sometimes mistaken for black. As his surname is not known, Will is given the name 'Will Treaty' for his role in the treaty between Araluen and Skandia.

- Alyss Mainwaring

A longtime friend of Will and Horace, she is tall and slender with fair skin, light eyes, and long blonde hair. She has a diplomatic nature and carries herself with poise and grace. She displays sharp wit and cunning and, despite her gentle nature, holds herself well among her sometimes rough and impulsively passionate friends.

- Horace Altman

As a child, Horace had a tendency to pick on Will. He is accepted as an apprentice in Battleschool and shows an uncanny aptitude with the sword. As they age, the spats of their youth fade away, and Horace and Will become best friends. He is a straightforward young man both in thought and attitude, favoring honour and displaying the strong ethics brought on by Battleschool training. He has an unparalleled appetite, pointed out on numerous occasions by his friends and much appreciated by Jenny. He makes friends with the Emperor of Nihon-Ja, Shigeru, who then comes to his wedding in The Lost Stories.

- Evanlyn/Cassandra

Cassandra, often known by the pseudonym Evanlyn when she wants her identity to remain secret, is the Crown Princess of Araluen and daughter of King Duncan. She is short in comparison to Alyss and has honey-colored hair and large green eyes. She quickly befriends Will and Horace, though develops a rivalry with Alyss. She is a natural leader, with an authoritative and often stubborn nature. She is dignified and quick-thinking and never one to shy away from an adventure, enjoying the outdoors and preferring the freedom of adventure to being cooped up in the Araluen Castle. She is fiercely loyal to her friends and places great stock in trust and the value of her companions.

- Halt O'Carrick

The object of many legends in the Kingdom, Halt prefers to keep to himself. These legends have preceded him and have been exaggerated, as is often so, such that many who meet him are surprised by his short and deceptively unassuming nature. While he is often viewed as standoffish and even dangerous, he enjoys the company of his cheerful and eager apprentice. Halt lives in a cottage at the edge of the fief, cutting his own dark hair with his knife and never seen out of his mottled green Ranger's cloak. His dark beard is flecked with grey. He is sharp and perceptive, maintaining an air of constant vigilance and seriousness. It is revealed in The Kings of Clonmel that Halt is the former Crown Prince of the Hibernian Kingdom of Clonmel and possessed two siblings: Ferris (his younger twin brother who usurped his claim to the throne and took over after Halt left following several attempts on his life made by Ferris) and Caitlyn (his younger sister who died several years prior and was the only member of Halt's family to believe him when Ferris attempted to assassinate Halt).

- Gilan

Gilan is Halt's previous apprentice and now a qualified Ranger. He is the son of a well-known knight in the kingdom. He was chosen from birth as a candidate for Battleschool and trained as a swordsman because of his knight father, Sir David, though he instead chose to become a Ranger. Accordingly, unlike most Rangers, he is an expert with the sword in addition to the bow. He has exceptional skills in stealth. He is very charismatic and known to tease his companions with good-natured humor. When Crowley dies, Gilan becomes the new Commandant (leader) of the Ranger Corps. He is currently in a relationship with Jenny, though their love is made problematic by distance, with Gilan being based in Araluen Fief while Jenny lives in Redmont fief.

- Crowley

Crowley is the Commandant of the Ranger Corps and bears many of the same characteristics as Halt. However, he does display openly a sense of humor and fondness for his Rangers. He is a master strategist and is the master in the Corps at silent movement.

- Tug

Tug is Will's horse. He is shaggy grey and only slightly larger than a pony, though he has been bred for incredible strength, stamina, and intelligence. He is trained to respond to an endless list of commands from his master and the bond between rider and horse is clear in the way that Tug never leaves Will's side. It is later revealed that the name Tug is passed down to every new horse Will receives, with the original Tug being granted the name Bellerophon. There have been at least three Tugs throughout the series.

- Madelyn Altman (Maddie)

She is the daughter of Horace and Cassandra and becomes the first female Ranger. She is Will's apprentice and uses a sling in addition to traditional Ranger weapons.

- Erak Starfollower

Erak is the current Oberjarl (supreme leader) of the Skandians and a former Senior Jarl (the Skandian equivalent of a nobleman). He appears in both The Ranger's Apprentice and The Brotherband Chronicles and is the gruff but fair leader of Skandia who values courage and bravery, no matter where or who it comes from. He first appears as part of the Skandians under Morgarath's pay during the rebel baron's war on Araluen. After Morgarath is killed, Erak and his crew escape onto their ship, taking Will and Evanlyn (aka Cassandra), who they had captured, with them to Skandia. During their trip back to Skandia, Erak grows rather fond of his two prisoners, being able to relate to them more than some of his own countrymen. After seeing a warmweed-addicted Will, Erak is horrified at seeing such a proud warrior be lowered like this, so he aids Cassandra in escaping with Will. Later, he serves as the staunchest Skandian ally of the group of Araluens (composed now of Will, Cassandra, Halt, and Horace) in their fight against the Temujai. After the Oberjarl Ragnak is killed, Erak is elected to fill his position.

- Malcolm

Malcolm, also known under the name of Malkallam, is a herbalist and healer from Norgate who originally serves as the antagonist of Will's first solo-mission. Though Will learns that Malcolm is actually a kind and caring man, befriending him and forming a lasting alliance. Later Malcolm is instrumental in curing Halt from a poisoning.

- Morgarath

Morgarath is the first major antagonist of the series, being the villain of the first two books and the series prequels as well as the short story of The Hibernian. He is a fearsome dark knight who through hypnosis and mental will has gathered an army of monsters under him. He is also indirectly responsible for the death of Will's Father.

- Tennyson

Tennyson is a major antagonist of the series, being the leader of the Outsider's Cult. With his remarkable charisma and gift for speech he manages to conquer five of the six Hibernian kingdoms and plans to do the same to Araluen and the final Kingdom of Clonmel. Halt, Will and Horace work with Halt's cousin Sean to stop Tennyson. As a result Tennyson has Halt's brother Ferris killed. During the pursuit of Tennyson, one of Tennyson's assassins manages to poison Halt. Tennyson is finally defeated when Will uses Malcolm's bombs to collapse a cave on the cult leader.

- Dimon

Dimon is a major antagonist of the series during the time of Maddie's apprenticeship. He is distant relative of Cassandra and Maddie, and tries to claim the throne of Araluen under the pretext of Male Primogeniture. Under the name Vulpus Rutilis he led the Red Fox Clan in a rebellion against King Duncan and Crown-Princess Cassandra. When his siege of Araluen is ultimately broken by Maddie, he attempts escape. But Dimon is cornered and ultimately killed by Cassandra.

== Publishing history and origins ==
John Flanagan stated that he first wrote the series as short stories for his son to get him interested in reading. This continued for about 20 weeks. Ten years later, John Flanagan found the stories again and decided to turn them into the first book, The Ruins of Gorlan. He never knew that the one book would be able to turn into so many volumes. In 2010, Flanagan was unsure how many volumes in the series he would release, saying, "I haven't set a limit. If I have an idea that will progress the characters, I'll write it. But I don't want to find myself jumping up and down on the same spot, as it were."

The inspiration for the series comes from many sources, including family, friends, and European times. Rangers are based on two groups of people, the Texas Rangers and the US Army Rangers of World War II. Although the US Rangers were based on British Commandos, Flanagan felt it would be better to use Rangers because of the medieval setting of the book. The mythical world of the story is based on England, Europe, and Scandinavia because Flanagan was inspired by "English and European culture and history". Flanagan is also interested in military subjects, which helped him write the battle scenes. Celtica's mining culture is like Wales, while Gallica takes its name and language from medieval France in its chivalric age around the year 1300.

Some of the books' characters were based on Flanagan's family and friends. Will was based on Flanagan's son Michael; both are agile, quick, and quite short. John Flanagan also made Will small in size because he wanted to show his son that there's an advantage to being small. The exchanges between Halt and Will are taken from conversations between Flanagan and his son as a teenager. Horace was inspired by Michael's best friend Jeremey. In the original story, Flanagan made Horace a villain at first, but then in the first book, Morgarath became the real villain and Horace was "rehabilitated" as a main character. Skandians were taken from Norse culture and Vikings, which Flanagan found interesting as a child. The gods and deities of the Skandians were taken from Norse mythology and Greek mythology. The god Loka mentioned a few times is based on Loki, the god of deceit. The Vallas, the trio of gods, are based on the Moirai.

=== Sales ===
Rights to sell Ranger's Apprentice have gone to 16 countries, including North America (where Oakleaf Bearers is better known as The Battle for Skandia), the United Kingdom, France, Germany, the Netherlands, Italy, Denmark, and Sweden. In Australia, the seventh book, Erak's Ransom, reached number two on Australian children's charts. The series has been on The New York Times Best Seller list for 77 weeks as of 13 December 2013. By 2010, over 2 million copies had been sold.

== Themes ==
John Flanagan states in an interview that the main theme is, "the eventual triumph of good over evil." He feels that although it does not always happen in real life, it should. Another theme especially prominent throughout Oakleaf Bearers is "the primacy of personal relationships over loyalties to one's country or duty." This is shown when Erak's friendship helps Will and Evanlyn escape, which allows the Araluens and Skandians to drive away the Temujai. Other themes include courage, loyalty, and that a person can do anything if they tried hard enough. One review noted that "themes of loyalty, bravery, endurance and friendship leave young readers in safe hands as they learn to navigate dangerous waters on their own."

== Camp ==
In 2010, BookPeople, which also created Camp Half-Blood from Percy Jackson & the Olympians, created a five-day Ranger's Apprentice Corps Training Camp based on the books. A total of 75 kids from the ages of 9–14 were chosen from 1,300 entries. A letter was sent to the kids from the voice of Will, actually written by John Flanagan, which stated they would learn "all the skills I was taught by Halt [Will's Ranger mentor] in the woods around Castle Redmont", including "archery, tracking, and the art of concealment and unseen movement." The 75 campers were divided into 12 fiefdoms where they were taught the skills and at the end, every kid received a T-shirt, a silver oak leaf pin, and a gold-embossed Ranger's Apprentice bookmark. This was the first literary camp that has sold out and has a waiting list besides Camp Half-Blood.

== Reception ==
A review for The Icebound Land stated "Though talented and intelligent, [Will] makes mistakes and he often needs help from those around him – making him a very realistic and appealing protagonist." A reviewer from Booklist stated "Will's vivid world will entice fantasy readers who are drawn by the lure of high adventure carried out by believable, down-to-earth heroes." A review by School Library Journal on Oakleaf Bearers praised the book on the high tensions raised and recommended it to people who enjoy action and adventure.

=== Awards ===
The Ranger's Apprentice series has won numerous awards. The series was one of the honour books for the Koala Winners in 2009. The seventh book, Erak's Ransom, was chosen as the Books of the Year for Older Children and the International Success Award. The first and fourth books won the Aurealis Awards while the third book was highly commended. Then, the first, second and fifth book each earned the Children's Book Council of Australia Notable Book. The first book was also the Longlisted for the Ottakar's Book Prize for 2006–2007 and the first book also was nominated for the Grand Canyon Reader Award in 2008.

== Film adaptation ==
As of 7 January 2008, Warner Bros. Pictures had optioned the film rights for The Ruins of Gorlan and was in talks with Oscar-winning filmmaker Paul Haggis to adapt and direct the film. When John Flanagan first heard the news he said:

It's just so overwhelming to see that the Ranger's series is set to head off in yet another exciting direction. When I think how this all started as a series of twenty short stories written for my son Michael, it sets my head spinning to think there's the distinct possibility that it will now be translated into movies and seen by millions of people around the world.

John Flanagan stated in 2014 that the funds for the film had been acquired and auditions would be held in the summer of 2015, in either Ireland or England. In March 2016, it was announced production would start late that year. Film Carnival decided to fund the company with US$500 million, but later pulled out, thus ending the production.

As of October 2019, it was announced that Dick Cook Studios (DCS), an independent production company helmed by former Walt Disney Studios chairman Dick Cook, would receive $20,473,020 from the Australian government to produce two fantasy features in the country, the first of which would be Ranger's Apprentice. Production was said to start July 2020.

Flanagan later stated that the producers had opted for a TV series instead of a film, and that production was delayed due to the COVID-19 pandemic.

In January 2024, it was reported that Skydance Media had acquired rights to the film with Theodore Melfi set to write the script, direct and produce.
