= Rebecca James (author) =

Australian YA author (born 1970)

- Born: 1970 (age 55–56); Sydney, Australia
- Occupation: Novelist
- Writing career
- Genres: Young adult, Thriller
- Notable work: Beautiful Malice
- Website: rebeccajamesbooks.com (defunct)

Rebecca James (born 1970 in Sydney, Australia) is an Australian author of young adult literature (YA).

== Biography ==
Her background, as posted by her then-literary agent, Conville & Walsh, in 2009, states:

Rebecca spent her early twenties working as a waitress, her late twenties teaching English in Indonesia and Japan, and most of her thirties having babies and working as a kitchen designer. ... She lives in Armidale, Australia with her partner and their four sons.

== Novels ==
- Beautiful Malice, published by Allen & Unwin in 2010
- Sweet Damage, published by Allen & Unwin in 2013
- Cooper Bartholomew is Dead, published by Allen & Unwin in 2014
- The Woman in the Mirror, published by HQ in 2018

== Pre-publication media interest ==
A Wall Street Journal article, published 23 October 2009, noted that the 39-year-old author, who just days earlier was a failed writer whose kitchen business had gone bankrupt and was considering selling her house, was suddenly "a success story reminiscent of Harry Potter author J.K. Rowling's, [she] is a mother and first-time author who is going from nothing to becoming a millionaire" due to a major publisher bidding war for what would soon become her first published novel, Beautiful Malice.
