= The Sorcerer in the North =

Book by John Flanagan

- Second Australian edition cover of The Sorcerer in the North
- Author: John Flanagan
- Language: English
- Series: Ranger's Apprentice (Book no. 5)
- Genre: Fantasy, Adventure
- Publisher: Random House (AUS)
- Publication date: 4 November 2006 (AUS); 4 Nov 2008 (USA); 6 August 2009 (UK)
- Publication place: Australia
- Media type: Print (Paperback)
- Pages: 329
- ISBN: 1-74166-128-5
- OCLC: 156766604
- Dewey Decimal: A823.4
- Preceded by: Oakleaf Bearers
- Followed by: The Siege of Macindaw

The Sorcerer in the North (The Sorcerer of the North in the United States) is the fifth book in the Ranger's Apprentice series by Australian author John Flanagan. It was released in Australia on 4 November 2006 and in the United States on 4 November 2008.

== Plot summary ==
The book starts off with Will rescuing a dog with a spear wound that he finds on the side of the road. Will then goes on to Castle Seacliff of the fief he has been assigned to and has a meeting with the baron there. After the meeting, a group of Skandians attempt to raid the fief and Will makes a deal with them: if he gives them food and drink, the Skandians will leave. When the owner of the dog tracks it and Will down, he is captured and handed over to the Skandians to become a slave before they leave.

Will is soon assigned to a mission to determine the identity of a mysterious sorcerer in Grimsdell Wood, and to stop him from terrorising the castle of Macindaw. Will goes under disguise as a jongleur; somebody who acts as a jester but doesn't serve a king, going around the kingdom entertaining for money. He does this because people tend to trust jongleurs, whereas people often clam up around Rangers due to the mystery surrounding their position. This would, in turn, help him to get information on Grimsdell Wood more easily. Will travels to Macindaw, where their lord, Syron, has been poisoned and is now in the hospital. His son Orman has taken over the castle while his father is ill, but Orman's cousin Keren has been trying to take over as lord, but Will does not know this yet. Will then rides to Grimsdell and sees the Night Warrior, one of the ghosts in Grimsdell, and flees in fear on his horse Tug.

Will performs for Orman during his dinner (in the great hall), but Orman claims he is a very bad jongleur due to his inability to play classical music. Will then meets Keren (who enters the dining hall late) and is under the impression that he is an affable person. Alyss (Will's friend and a Diplomatic Service Courier) then comes disguised as a noblewoman. The next day, Will sees sorcery books on Orman's table and suspects he is the sorcerer in the woods. Will takes Alyss to Grimsdell wood during the day and Alyss works out how the magician made the Night Warrior. Following this, Alyss sends a report to Halt and Crowley with a pigeon.

Halt (Will's former mentor) gets the report and decides he should send Horace, a knight on the king's guard as well as a friend of Will and Alyss, to help with Will's mission. Meanwhile, Orman has been poisoned too and is dying. The only way to help him is to go to the sorcerer in Grimsdell Wood who used to be a healer (this is only Orman's suspicion, but takes the chance). Will is forced to run for Grimsdell Wood but leaves Alyss behind in Castle Macindaw. Shadow (the name Will gave to his dog) finds a trail and leads them to Malcolm (the healer)'s house. He greets them after they see a giant walking around and other deformed people who Malcolm took in as helpers and patients. Will then tries to save Alyss, who has been captured by Keren, but Keren walks in the door and Will barely manages to escape alive.
