= The Siege of Macindaw =

Book by John Flanagan

- Second Australian edition cover of The Siege of Macindaw
- Author: John Flanagan
- Language: English
- Series: Ranger's Apprentice (Book no. 6)
- Genre: Fantasy, Adventure
- Publisher: Random House (Australia)
- Publication date: 1 May 2007 (Aus); 4 August 2009
- Publication place: Australia
- Media type: Print (Paperback and Hardcover)
- Pages: 371 (Australian edition); 324 (US edition)
- ISBN: 1-74166-134-X
- OCLC: 174078072
- Dewey Decimal: A823.4
- Preceded by: The Sorcerer in the North
- Followed by: Erak's Ransom

The Siege of Macindaw is the sixth book in the Ranger's Apprentice series by Australian author John Flanagan. The book was first published on 1 May 2007 in Australia and on 4 August 2009 in the United States.

== Plot summary ==
With the overthrow of Castle Macindaw by Keren, Orman's traitorous cousin, Will needs to find men to help win back the crucial northern stronghold. Will seeks out a group of shipwrecked Skandians and hires them as mercenaries. Halt and Crowley, Will's former mentor and the leader of the Ranger Corps, send the young knight Horace to help Will. Together, they manage to take the Scotti general MacHaddish prisoner and find that Keren has made a deal with the Scotti and is allowing them access to Araluen's northern fiefs in return for a portion of their plunder.

The Araluen Courier Alyss has been held captive by Keren who is hypnotizing and interrogating her for information. Will sends Alyss a star stone, an anti-hypnosis device, and with it she is able to deceive Keren into thinking he has hypnotized her for a while. Alyss and Will send each other messages using the Courier signal code.

Will and the Skandians make an improvised siege engine, ostensibly to attack the castle. It collapses, according to plan, and the Skandians pretend to flee in panic. The castle defenders quickly become uninterested in the strange machine and are easily distracted by a show of lights to the south, caused by Will's ally, the "sorcerer" Malcolm. Meanwhile, Keren asks Alyss for her hand in marriage, however she refuses.

When all the focus is away from the west wall, Will and Horace, who had been hidden in the siege engine, breach the wall using a ladder; the Skandians follow them later. They slaughter the defenders and quickly gain a foothold in the castle and Will runs to the central tower to rescue Alyss. Keren, however, has now successfully hypnotised her. Keren tells her to kill Will if he hurts him in any way. Will tells Alyss he loves her, which breaks her hypnotic state. A fight between Keren and Will ensues. Armed only with his saxe knife against Keren's sword, Will quickly is overpowered but is saved when Alyss throws acid in Keren's face, causing him to fall out of the tower window to his death.

Later, many soldiers from Castle Norgate come to Macindaw to ensure the Scotti invasion force is turned back, leaving the Skandians to defend Macindaw. When he returns to Malcolm's home in Grimsdell Wood, Will decides to give his dog Shadow to Malcolm's friend Trobar. Will goes back to Seacliff Fief and falls into a peaceful but unfulfilling lifestyle. He later receives a letter from Alyss in which she says that she loves him. Will hurriedly saddles his horse Tug and begins the trek to Castle Redmont to deliver his reply.
