= Wyatt (novel) =

2010 novel by Garry Disher

- First edition
- Author: Garry Disher
- Language: English
- Publisher: Text Publishing, Australia
- Publication date: 2010
- Publication place: Australia
- Media type: Print (Paperback)
- Pages: 274
- ISBN: 9781921656026
- Preceded by: The Fallout

Wyatt is a 2010 crime novel by Australian novelist Garry Disher which won the 2010 Ned Kelly Award. It is the seventh novel in the author's series of novels featuring the recurring character of Wyatt (no first name), a professional thief and burglar.

== Abstract ==
"The job’s a classic jewel heist: quick, clean and simple. Except for one thing. Wyatt prefers to work alone, but this job belongs to Eddie Oberin and his very smart ex-wife Lydia. She has the inside information; Wyatt has the planning genius and meticulous preparation. What could possibly go wrong?"

== Interviews ==
- Jo Case, of Readings, interviewed the author on the release of the novel.
- Andrew Nette, of Pulp Curry interviewed the author about this book and the others in his series.

== Reviews ==
- Publishers Weekly gave the book a starred reviewed and stated: "The spare, economical prose perfectly suits this tale of mad love and crimes gone wrong, which will remind many of Westlake's better Parker novels".
- In The Sydney Morning Herald Sue Turnbull notes that "Disher has [...] refined his pared-back style over the years while retaining a centrality of vision...it is his capacity to wait, quietly and coolly, which is the secret of his success. Unlike the rest of the human race, Wyatt never acts hastily. His every move is calculated and efficient. One can't help but admire him for that economy of motion even if he is a crook."

== Awards and nominations ==
- 2010 winner Ned Kelly Award
