= Snapshot (novel) =

2005 novel by Australian writer Garry Disher

- Cover of the 2007 Soho Press edition
- Author: Garry Disher
- Language: English
- Series: Challis/Destry
- Genre: Crime novels
- Publisher: Text Publishing
- Publication date: 2005
- Publication place: Australia
- Media type: Print
- Pages: 337 pp.
- ISBN: 1920885722
- Preceded by: Kittyhawk Down
- Followed by: Chain of Evidence

Snapshot (2005) is a novel by Australian writer Garry Disher.

This is the third novel in the author's "Challis/Destry" series of crime novels, following The Dragon Man (1999), and Kittyhawk Down (2003).

== Synopsis ==
Detective Inspector Hal Challis investigates the death of a young woman, murdered in front of her daughter. Complicating matters is the fact that she is the daughter-in-law of Challis's Superintendent. As Challis digs into the case he discovers that the murdered woman and her husband were hiding many secrets.

== Critical reception ==
In The Age newspaper Jeff Glorfeld states that the author "lays it all out with his usual masterful feel for pacing, which is deceptive to say the least; the story develops slowly and is never rushed."

Reviewing the novel for Australian Book Review Rick Thompson noted that it was 100 pages shorter than its predecessor, commenting that "it is much more pared back, leaner and smarter about what a police procedural (PP) can be." He compared Disher's work here to Elmore Leonard specifying how he "shifts his interior third-person narrative from character to character."

== Publication history ==
After its original publication in 2005 by Text Publishing the novel was later reprinted as follows:

- 2006 Text Publishing, Australia
- 2007 Soho Press, USA

The novel was also translated into German in 2006, and into Spanish in 2010.

== Notes ==
- Dedication: For Chris.

== See also ==
- 2005 in Australian literature
