= Chain of Evidence =

2007 novel by Garry Disher

- First edition
- Author: Garry Disher
- Language: English
- Series: Challis/Destry
- Genre: Crime fiction
- Publisher: Text Publishing
- Publication date: 2007
- Publication place: Australia
- Media type: Print Hardback & Paperback
- Pages: 375 pp
- Awards: 2007 Ned Kelly Award Best novel, winner
- ISBN: 1-86508-619-3
- OCLC: 51500273
- LC Class: PR9619.3.M469 J68 2002
- Preceded by: Snapshot
- Followed by: Blood Moon

Chain of Evidence is a 2007 Ned Kelly Award-winning novel by the Australian author Garry Disher.

== Story outline ==
Hal Challis is head of a crime investigation unit for Victoria Police, based on the Mornington Peninsula. He has traveled back to his hometown of Mawsons Bluff in South Australia to be with his father who is dying. While there he investigates the disappearance of his sister's husband, missing for five years.

Back in Mornington Ellen Destry is filling in for Challis and house-sitting for him. She is investigating the disappearance of a child walking home from school.

== Awards ==
- Ned Kelly Award, Best novel, 2007: winner

== Notes ==
This is the fourth novel in the author's "Challis/Destry" series of crime novels, following The Dragon Man (1999), Kittyhawk Down (2003), and Snapshot (2005).

== Reviews ==
Jeff Glorfeld, in The Age, noted the police procedural nature of the novel: "Down on the Mornington Peninsula, Garry Disher has again stripped away the pretty scenery to reveal the often grim lives of people on the fringes. Through the eyes of the men and women staffing the Waterloo police station we see the violence and desperation, and the anger - of the citizens in their homes and on the streets, and in their own lives in particular. There's nothing glamorous or even particularly fulfilling about this kind of police work...It is a triumph for Disher that such a bleak scenario becomes an enthralling piece of entertainment. It's all about the people, of course. Newcomers can certainly start here - and this is by far Disher's best yet in the series - but there's no denying that having come this far with Challis and Co adds a lot to the experience. But taken as a whole, this instalment puts Disher up on the world stage among the best in the business at this style of crime fiction."

In The Sydney Morning Herald Sue Turnbull was impressed with the work: "Multilayered and multistranded, Chain of Evidence is written in vivid and uncompromising prose. A writer of both literary fiction and prize-winning children's books, Disher never skimps on his craft. Most impressive are the descriptions of landscape and place written with the precision of a social anthropologist and the vision of a poet."
