= The Royal Ranger: A New Beginning =

Book by John Flanagan

A New Beginning
- Australian cover of The Royal Ranger: A New Beginning
- Author: John Flanagan
- Language: English
- Series: Ranger's Apprentice: The Royal Ranger (book no. 1)
- Genre: Fantasy, Adventure
- Publisher: Random House (AUS & NZ)
- Publication date: 1 October 2013 (AUS); 4 October 2013 (NZ); 5 November 2013 (US)
- Publication place: Australia
- Media type: Hardcover, Paperback and e-book
- Pages: 448
- ISBN: 9781864718195 (paperback); 9781742750606 (e-book)
- Dewey Decimal: A823.4
- Preceded by: Ranger's Apprentice
- Followed by: The Red Fox Clan

A New Beginning, originally titled The Royal Ranger was released in Australia on 1 October 2013, in New Zealand on 4 October 2013, and in the United States and Canada on 5 November 2013. In 2018, it was renamed A New Beginning and it became the first book in the Ranger's Apprentice sequel series, The Royal Ranger.

Original novel cover art in Australia before the rename.

== Plot ==
Will Treaty tries to cope with the death of Alyss his late wife, who died in a fire set in an inn by a gang leader (Jory Ruhl) when she went back inside the burning building to save a young child. Will's friends try to bring back his once cheerful personality. After many attempts to "snap him out of it", Gilan, the new Ranger Commandant, calls on Halt, Pauline, Cassandra, and Horace to discuss how to deal with Will. Halt suggests that Will take on an apprentice to take his mind off his quest for revenge.

Meanwhile, Princess Madelyn, daughter of Horace and Cassandra, is upset with her restrained royal life. Against the will of her parents, Maddie sneaks out at night to use her sling to hunt small animals. One night, Cassandra and Horace confront Maddie and ground her to her room for two weeks. Halt suggests that Maddie be the one taken on by Will, which would make Maddie the first female Ranger's apprentice in Ranger history. At the beginning of her apprenticeship, Will gives Maddie a letter from her parents, in which says she has been disinherited as a princess of Araluen. This is a desperate last resort by her parents to get her under control. Will proceeds to train Maddie, and as he focuses on her, his quest for revenge is slowly forgotten. When Gilan suggests Will take Maddie on a mission, Will accepts without reluctance.

Gilan assigns Will and Maddie to investigate the death of Liam, a Ranger in Trelleth Fief, a northwestern fief. Will and Maddie soon discover a plot by an illicit slave ring who kidnap children. The criminals first send a storyteller to villages which frightens the children with a story about the "Stealer in the Night". The storyteller seeks out a child who is likely being abused at home and also takes children who aren't quiet about speaking about the Stealer. Will learns that the Stealer in the Night – the leader of the slave ring – is actually Jory Ruhl, but he manages to set aside his revenge to save the children Ruhl has kidnapped. Will and Maddie go to the slavers' camp, where Will distracts the criminals, while Maddie frees the slaves. Unfortunately, while Maddie is successful in freeing the children, Will is captured by the gang and tied to a stake to be burned. Maddie then goes to save Will, ending in Ruhl's death.

Six months later, Maddie is awarded her Bronze Oakleaf, and Cassandra offers her reinstatement as a princess. However, Maddie declines, saying she wishes to complete her apprenticeship instead. Cassandra is stunned, and the book concludes as Horace explains to her that Rangers have always been different. When Cassandra asks what she should do, Horace tells her they just have to live with it.

== Reception ==
Kirkus Reviews remarked positively on the novel, calling it "An excellent addition to a favorite series; the short breather did Flanagan good."
