= The Burning Bridge =

2005 novel by John Flanagan

- Second Australian edition cover of The Burning Bridge
- Author: John Flanagan
- Illustrator: Alexander Donatelli
- Language: English
- Series: Ranger's Apprentice (Book no. 2)
- Genre: Fantasy, Adventure
- Publisher: Random House (Australia); Philomel (USA)
- Publication date: 5 May 2005 (Aus)
- Publication place: Australia
- Media type: Print (Paperback)
- Pages: 276 (Australian paperback edition); 256 (US hardcover edition)
- ISBN: 1-74166-090-4 (1st Australian edition); ISBN 0-399-24455-7 (US hardcover edition)
- OCLC: 62866741
- Dewey Decimal: A823.4
- Preceded by: The Ruins of Gorlan
- Followed by: The Icebound Land

The Burning Bridge is the second book of the Ranger's Apprentice series, written by Australian author John Flanagan. It was released in Australia on 5 May 2005.

== Plot summary ==
In the prologue, Halt (a legendary Ranger) and Will (the protagonist and Halt's apprentice), capture Dirk Reacher, one of the evil Lord Morgarath's former henchmen. They search Reacher and find Morgarath's battle plans to invade Araluen.

Later, on a special mission for the Ranger Corps, Will, his friend Horace (a Battleschool apprentice), and the Ranger Gilan (one of Halt's former apprentices) travel to Celtica, a neighbouring country southwest of Araluen, where they discover that all the people in the villages have mysteriously vanished. Will and Horace wonder if all the villagers have been slain or captured, but Gilan believes that Morgarath devised a plan to cross the mountain pass faster. Gilan rides to warn King Duncan, the King of Araluen, and Will and Horace begin to follow a straggling Wargal force.

On their way, they come across an abandoned girl named Evanlyn, who claims to be a maid to Lady Ariana Wulton of the Araluen court, but is actually Princess Cassandra, King Duncan's daughter, in disguise. The three of them continue following the Wargals and discover that a bridge is being built across the impassable Fissure in order for their war party to cross. They also discover that the battle plans obtained earlier were fake, and Morgarath's real plan is to trap the King's army on the Plains of Uthal. Will burns the bridge with Evanlyn's help. Will and Evanlyn are then taken captive by a group of Skandians ruled by Jarl Erak, but Horace is able to escape their grasp.

Meanwhile, the King and his aides have been informed of the impending danger, and are getting prepared for battle. Halt is sent to take care of them with a force of cavalry and archer units. In the middle of the battle, Morgarath calls a truce and challenges Halt to a duel, but King Duncan forbids it to happen. Then, unexpectedly, Horace challenges Morgarath to single combat. On the verge of defeat by Morgarath, Horace throws himself into the path of Mogarath's battle horse in an attempt to throw it off balance. He succeeds, but only manages to wound Morgarath. Morgarath, confident in his imminent victory, strikes with his broadsword, but Horace blocks it with the double-knife defence that Gilan taught Will in Celtics and stabs Morgarath in the heart to win the battle.

The Wargals become harmless as soon as Morgarath dies, and the mind domination is broken. Halt goes looking for Will and Cassandra immediately, but he is too late. The Skandians sail for Skandia to sell Will and Princess Cassandra as slaves.

== Publication history ==
After the novel's initial publication in Australian in 2005, it was translated into Swedish and Polish in 2007, Turkish in 2010, and Japanese in 2012.
