= Eight Miles =

"Eight Miles" is a science fiction short story by Sean McMullen. It was first published in Analog Science Fiction in 2010.

== Synopsis ==
In 1840, hot air balloonist Harold Parkes is hired to perform an extended ascent to a hazardous altitude... and to bring a strange passenger with him.

== Reception ==
"Eight Miles" was a finalist for the 2011 Hugo Award for Best Novelette, and was ranked second.
