= The Battle of Hackham Heath =

Book by John Flanagan

- Author: John Flanagan
- Illustrator: Jeremy Reston
- Language: English
- Series: Ranger's Apprentice: The Early Years (Book no. 2)
- Genre: Fantasy, adventure
- Publisher: Random House (AUS & NZ); Philomel (US & UK)
- Publication date: 31 October 2016 (AUS & NZ); 29 November 2016 (US & UK)
- Publication place: Australia
- Media type: Print (Paperback); E-book
- Pages: 400 (AUS); 384 (US)
- ISBN: 978-0399163623
- Preceded by: The Tournament at Gorlan
- Followed by: -

The Battle of Hackham Heath is a 2016 young adult fantasy novel by Australian author John Flanagan.

It is the second novel in the Ranger's Apprentice: The Early Years series. It was first released in Australia on 31 October 2016, and in the United States on 29 November 2016. The series serves as a prequel to the Ranger's Apprentice series.

== Critical reception ==
Reviewing the novel for The Children's Book Council of Australia Jane Campbell noted: "As with any quest, there is plenty of action and adventure, and it is easy to see why John Flanagan’s books are so popular."
