= Rob Mundle =

Australian yachtsman, maritime commentator and author

Rob Mundle OAM is an Australian yachtsman, maritime commentator and author.

He is the author of some 19 books, six of which have become best sellers, including Captain James Cook: from Sailor to Legend; Fatal Storm: The 54th Sydney to Hobart Yacht Race; Bligh: Master Mariner; and Flinders: The Man Who Mapped Australia. Since publishing those biographies Mundle is regarded as a contemporary authority on James Cook, William Bligh and Matthew Flinders.

Mundle began sailing as a boy. After finishing school he became a cadet journalist at The Australian newspaper, which led to a career as a noted nautical commentator in print, radio and television and to him becoming known as 'the voice of sailing'.

Since the 1980s he has covered the America's Cup, sailing in the Olympics and the Sydney to Hobart Yacht Race, on which he is regarded as an authority.

Mundle is credited with introducing the Laser and J24 class boats into Australia. From 2011 to 2013 he was Commodore of Southport Yacht Club.

In 2000 Mundle was award the Australian Sports Medal for services to sailing in the media; and in 2013 was awarded the Order of Australia Medal (OAM) for services to sailing and to journalism.

== Selected bibliography ==
- Mundle, Rob; Billingham, Paul; Hardy, Sir James (2019). The Sydney Hobart Yacht Race: The Story of a Sporting Icon. ABC Books. ISBN 9780655632252.
- Mundle, Rob (2019). Cook QBD. ABC Books. ISBN 9780733340543.
- Mundle, Rob (2017). Great South Land. ABC Books. ISBN 9780733332371.
- Mundle, Rob (2016). Under Full Sail. HarperCollins Australia. ISBN 9780733334696.
- Mundle, Rob; Spithill, Jimmy (2019). 50 nodi: Inseguendo la Coppa America. Tea. ISBN 9788850249237.
- Mundle, Rob (2015). Dampier, the Dutch and the Great South Land. HarperCollins Australia. ISBN 9781460705605.
- Mundle, Rob (2014). The First Fleet. HarperCollins Australia. ISBN 9780733332364.
- Mundle, Rob (2014). Captain James Cook: from Sailor to Legend. HarperCollins Australia. ISBN 9781460700617.
- Mundle, Rob (2012). Flinders: The Man Who Mapped Australia. Hachette UK. ISBN 9780733637384.
- Mundle, Rob (2011). Bligh: Master Mariner. Hachette UK. ISBN 9780733628467.
- Mundle, Rob (2010). Bligh: Master Mariner. Hachette Australia. ISBN 978-0-7336-2506-0.
- Mundle, Rob (2010). Hell on High Seas: Amazing Stories of Survival Against the Odds. HarperCollins Australia. ISBN 9780732288839.
- Mundle, Rob (2010). Ocean Warriors. HarperCollins Australia. ISBN 9780732272388.
- Mundle, Rob (2006). Life at the Extreme: The Volvo Ocean Race Round the World 2005-2006. Nomad Press. ISBN 9780977129485.
- Mundle, Rob; Bond, Alan (2004). Alan Bond: My Story. HarperCollins Publishers Australia. ISBN 9780732274955.
- Mundle, Rob (2003). Ocean Warriors: The Thrilling Story of the 2001/2002 Volvo Ocean Race Round the World. HarperCollins Australia. ISBN 9780060508081.
- Mundle, Rob (1999). Fatal Storm: The 54th Sydney to Hobart Yacht Race. HarperCollins Australia. ISBN 9780732269234.
