= Oakleaf Bearers =

Book by John Flanagan

- Second Australian edition cover of Oakleaf Bearers
- Author: John Flanagan
- Language: English
- Series: Ranger's Apprentice (Book no. 4)
- Genre: Fantasy, Adventure
- Publisher: Random House (Australia)
- Publication date: 1 May 2006 (Aus); 18 March 2008 (USA); 5 June 2008 (UK)
- Publication place: Australia
- Media type: Print (Paperback)
- Pages: 327 (Australian edition)
- ISBN: 1-74166-082-3 (1st Australian edition); ISBN 978-1-86471-907-9 (2nd Australian edition)
- OCLC: 86108278
- Dewey Decimal: A823.4
- Preceded by: The Icebound Land
- Followed by: The Sorcerer in the North

Oakleaf Bearers, or The Battle for Skandia in the United States, is a 2006 fantasy novel by Australian author John Flanagan. It is the fourth novel in the Ranger's Apprentice book series. Its story continues from where the previous book, The Icebound Land, ended. The book continues to track Will on his adventures and includes such characters as Halt, his mentor, and Horace, his best friend.

This book was a finalist for the 2007 Aurealis Award for Best Children's Novel.

== Plot summary ==
In the previous book, The Icebound Land, Cassandra (the Crown Princess of Araluen) and Will (an apprentice Ranger) had been captured and sold as slaves in Skandia. As time went on, Halt (Will’s mentor and a legendary Ranger) and Horace (a Battleschool apprentice and Will's best friend) travelled across Gallica, defeating knights, and ridding Gallica of the evil warlord Deparnieux. They are now in Gallica ready to travel through a pass into Skandia to save Will and Cassandra (known as Evanlyn). Meanwhile, Will has overcome his addiction to warmweed and finally regains his senses. Cassandra is out checking previously set snares for food when she is captured by a member of a Temujai scout party, or Tem'uj.

Halt and Horace, still on their rescue mission, find a border outpost where a dozen Skandians lay dead, shot by arrows. Halt manages to recognise an arrow, shot by the Temujai and becomes instantly worried. Two decades ago, the Temujai had nearly conquered the world, but with politics and a dish of bad shellfish, the invasion was stopped. Around the same time, Will recovers enough to search for Cassandra after realising she has gone missing and finds her about to be killed by one of the Temujai. In an ensuing battle, Halt and Horace, having managed to track the Temujai down, come to Will's aid and they rescue Cassandra.

Halt and the group, after being reunited, are then captured by Erak, the Skandian Jarl who had set Cassandra and Will free. Erak had been trying to track down the people who shot the Skandians at the other gate, and hastily comes to the conclusion that Halt was responsible. Halt manages to convince the senior Jarl to listen to him, stating that the Skandians have no chance as they are greatly outnumbered and the Temujai have long-range archers, versus the Skandians in one-on-one close combat. Halt and Erak also manage to find the main army of the Temujai, followed by a very narrow escape because of Erak's extreme clumsiness.

Halt makes the decision to stay in Skandia to help them in their coming war against the Temujai, as he fears they will take the Skandians' ships to invade Araluen after they win. Erak agrees to get Ragnak, the Oberjarl, to let Halt become their strategist as he had lived and fought with and against the Temujai before, thus knowing their battle plans and style of fighting.

Halt and Will also attempt to convince the Oberjarl to allow Will to train 100 slaves to become archers with the promise of freedom, and he does so reluctantly. 100 Skandians are also assigned to use hit-and-run tactics to delay the Temujai's arrival in Hallasholm. The Temujai do not expect this kind of strategic action from the blunt Skandians, and their leaders begin to have some suspicions.

Soon, the Temujai begin their first attack using strategic units of fifty troops known as Ulans and, as Halt had said previously, make a fake retreat, which the Skandians purposely follow. Halt, however, had placed a group of Skandians in a forest behind the frontline to ambush the Temujai. This ambush of their own drives the remaining Temujai forces back to the General of the Army, and his Colonel of Intelligence, who are surprised because the Skandians were not behaving anything at all as they'd expected.

In the battle, Will manages to keep his archers concealed for a while, but they are eventually spotted. Will keeps his archers firing their arrows, but following an assault by multiple Ulan leaders, the force is cut down until they cannot continue. Meanwhile, the Skandians begin to make an impact on the opposing army, and the General orders a retreat back to his homeland as he has lost too many warriors. Halt makes it clear that the Skandians did not win, but rather made it too costly for the Temujai to continue.

Afterward, a funeral is held for Ragnak who succumbed to the dozens of wounds he received in the battle. Erak is subsequently elected as Oberjarl and signs a treaty with Cassandra, stipulating that Skandia will not participate in large-scale raids on Araluen like their alliance with Morgarath again in exchange for a force of archers for Skandia's defence. Following this, Erak takes the group back to Araluen. After a long and happy reunion, Will and Cassandra then find out that Halt has been banished; Erak saves the awkward moment by trying to include it in their treaty to pardon him, to which King Duncan agrees. In the end, Halt is invited back to the Ranger Corps, Horace is rewarded with a knighthood and position in Cassandra's personal guard, and Will is given the opportunity to become a lieutenant of the Royal Scouts, a high position in the King's army that trains archers, into which only nobles are admitted; this would give him fame and reputation, but Will, in his heart, knows that he wishes to continue his training to become a full-fledged Ranger and states this as he rejects the offer. As he rides back to Redmont with Halt, Cassandra voices her sadness as she feels she and Will are becoming distant, but Horace, in an attempt to comfort her, reminds her that the Rangers will always be different.
