= The Diggers Rest Hotel =

Crime novel by Geoffrey McGeachin

- Author: Geoffrey McGeachin
- Language: English
- Series: Charlie Berlin
- Genre: Crime novel
- Publisher: Penguin, Australia
- Publication date: 2010
- Publication place: Australia
- Media type: Print (Paperback)
- Pages: 316
- ISBN: 9780670072736
- Preceded by: Dead and Kicking
- Followed by: Blackwattle Creek

The Diggers Rest Hotel (2010) is a crime novel by Australian author Geoffrey McGeachin. It is the first in the author's Charlie Berlin mystery series and won the 2011 Ned Kelly Award for Best Novel.

== Plot summary ==
Charlie Berlin, a bomber pilot during World War II, rejoins the Melbourne police force after the war and in 1947 he is sent to Albury-Wodonga to investigate a series of violent robberies.

== Reviews ==
Fair Dinkum Crime found the novel to build to be a winner and that the author "has taken care with the historical detail and it gives the novel a great feeling of authenticity".

== Awards and nominations ==
- 2011 winner Ned Kelly Award — Best Novel
