= Blood Moon (novel) =

2009 novel by Australian author Garry Disher

- Author: Garry Disher
- Language: English
- Series: Peninsula Crime
- Genre: Crime novel
- Publisher: Text Publishing
- Publication date: 1 December 2009
- Publication place: Australia
- Media type: Print
- Pages: 314 pp.
- ISBN: 9781921351877
- Preceded by: Chain of Evidence
- Followed by: Whispering Death

Blood Moon is a 2009 crime novel by the Australian author Garry Disher.

This was the fifth in the author's Peninsula Crime series of novels.

== Synopsis ==
"Schoolies" week is about to begin on the Mornington Peninsula as a lunar eclipse approaches, promising that the local police will be kept busy keeping the non-locals under control. Meanwhile, Inspector Hal Challis and Sergeant Ellen Destry are investigating the bashing of Lachlan Roe, chaplain at Landseer School. And then a member of the local council's planning staff is murdered.

== Critical reception ==
Writing for Australian Book Review, Tony Smith praised Disher's characters and plot, writing that "Without any trace of intrusiveness or didacticism, Disher uses an intricate web of relationships to expose hypocrisy and question popular notions of justice...Because Disher does not write to a formula and enjoys his literary work, Blood Moon gives the reader a rare sense of satisfaction."

The review of Blood Moon in Publishers Weekly was more mixed, with the reviewer praising Disher's writing style but criticizing the deus ex machina resolution of the plot.

== Publishing history ==
After its initial publication in Australia by Text Publishing in 2009, it was reprinted by Soho Press in USA in 2010. The novel was also translated into German in 2012.

== See also ==
- 2009 in Australian literature
