= John Flanagan (author) =

Australian fantasy author (1944–2026)

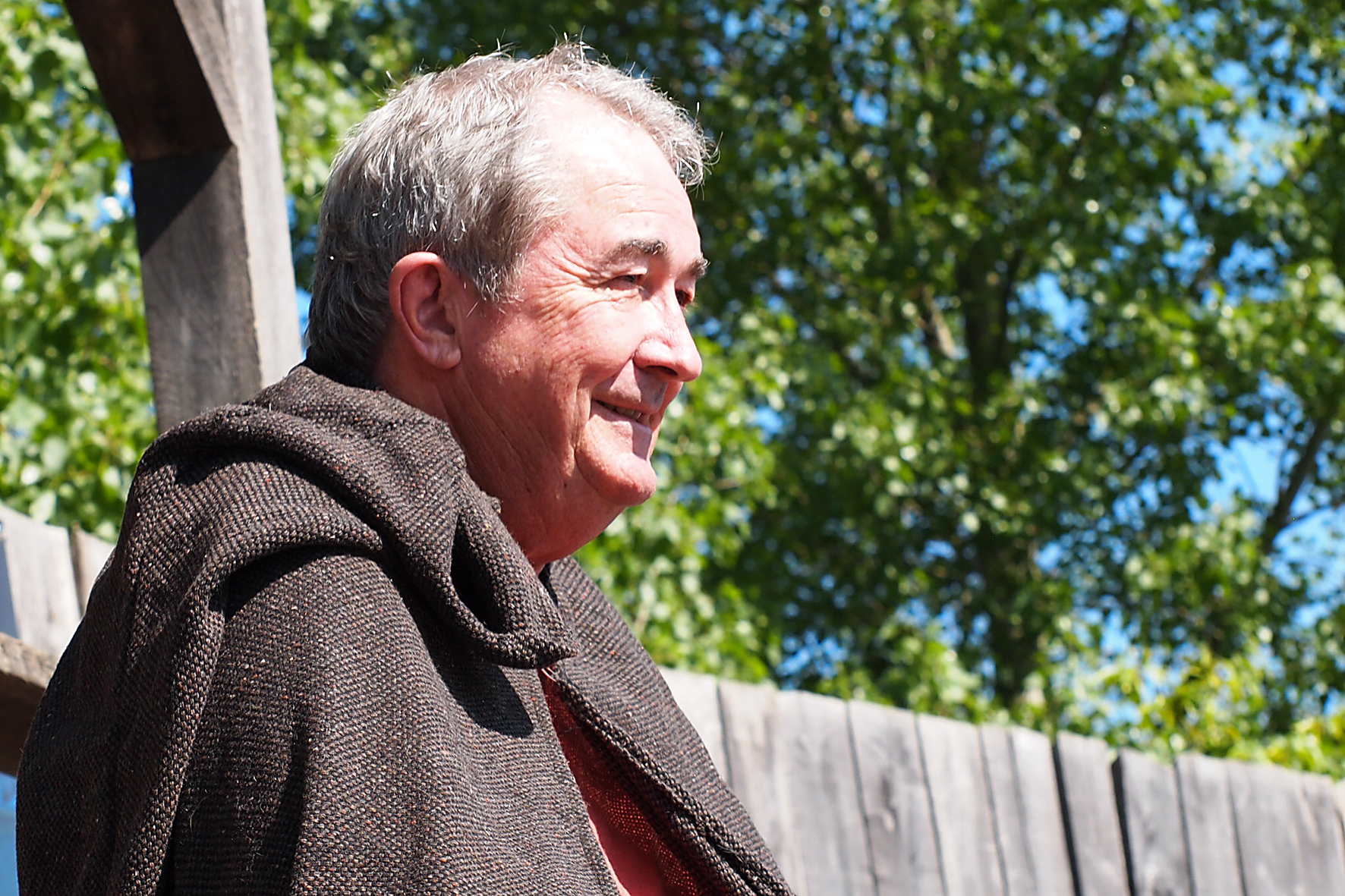
- Flanagan in 2012
- Born: John Anthony Flanagan; 22 May 1944; Sydney, Australia
- Died: 7 February 2026 (aged 81)
- Occupations: Novelist, screenwriter
- Spouse: Leonie Flanagan
- Children: Michael Flanagan; Kitty Flanagan; Penny Flanagan
- Writing career
- Language: English
- Genres: Fantasy, adventure
- Notable works: Ranger's Apprentice; Brotherband

John Anthony Flanagan (22 May 1944 – 7 February 2026) was an Australian fantasy author best known for his medieval fantasy series, the Ranger's Apprentice, and its sister series, the Brotherband Chronicles. Some of his other works include his Storm Peak duology, as well as the adult novel The Grey Raider.

== Early life and careers ==
John Flanagan was born in Sydney, Australia on 22 May 1944. He graduated from Waverley College with plans to become a writer. As he grew up, he changed careers and got a job at an advertising agency. He originally planned to become a copywriter, but the agency instead assigned him to train as a media researcher. While working as a media researcher trainee, he wrote an offensive poem directed toward one of his senior executives. Eventually, the poem made it to the desk of one of the company's directors. Flanagan was called into the director's office where he complimented Flanagan's writing skills and offered him the job of trainee copywriter. After working in the advertising agency for 20 years, Flanagan entered the TV industry and co-wrote a sitcom called Hey Dad..!.

== Becoming a writer ==
Flanagan's early novels originated mainly as thrillers. He started working on what would become the Ranger's Apprentice series in the 1990s. The series originated as twenty short stories for his twelve-year-old son, Michael. Flanagan wanted to encourage his son to read and hoped that he could do so by convincing Michael that the stories were children's book ideas that his father wanted to test out. Also, since Michael was on the smaller side, Flanagan wanted to encourage him by showing that not all heroes must be big and strong. In fact, several characters in Flanagan's books are based on real-life people close to him. Will, the main character in the series, was initially based on Michael. Small, agile, and his love of climbing were all things that Michael and Will shared. Evanlyn, one of the other main characters, was loosely based on Flanagan's daughter Kitty. Finally, Halt, Will's older teacher, was also based on Flanagan's sixth-grade teacher. His son fell in love with the series and began asking for more of the stories. In the early 2000s, John decided to make the stories into the first novel, The Ruins of Gorlan, and it was published in 2004. 11 books comprise the main Ranger's Apprentice series. He also wrote the Ranger's Apprentice: The Early Years series which explores the time before the first book, and continued the story in the Ranger's Apprentice: The Royal Ranger series. His other series in the same world, Brotherband, was based around Flanagan's passion and love of the sea.

== Death ==
Flanagan died on 7 February 2026, at the age of 81.

== Achievements ==
- In 2008, he won the Australian Publishers Association's Book of the Year for "Older Children and the International Success Award" for Erak's Ransom.
- The Ranger's Apprentice: The Ruins of Gorlan became optioned as a movie.
- The Ranger's Apprentice series has appeared on the New York Times Best Sellers List.

== Bibliography ==
=== Ranger's Apprentice ===
1. The Ruins of Gorlan (2004)
2. The Burning Bridge (2005)
3. The Icebound Land (2005)
4. Oakleaf Bearers (2006) (The Battle for Skandia in the US)
5. The Sorcerer in the North (2006) (The Sorcerer of the North in the US)
6. Siege of Macindaw (2007)
7. Erak's Ransom (2007)
8. The Kings of Clonmel (2008)
9. Halt's Peril (2009)
10. The Emperor of Nihon-Ja (2010)
11. The Lost Stories (2011)

=== Ranger's Apprentice: The Royal Ranger ===
1. A New Beginning (2013) - Originally released as the 12th book of the Ranger's Apprentice Series, changed in 2018
2. The Red Fox Clan (2018)
3. Duel At Araluen (2019)
4. The Missing Prince (2020)
5. Escape from Falaise (2021)
6. Arazan's Wolves (2022)
7. Ambush at Sorato (2024)

=== Ranger's Apprentice: The Early Years ===
1. The Tournament at Gorlan (2015)
2. The Battle of Hackham Heath (2016)

=== Brotherband ===
1. The Outcasts (2011)
2. The Invaders (2012)
3. The Hunters (2012)
4. Slaves of Socorro (2014)
5. Scorpion Mountain (2014)
6. The Ghostfaces (2016)
7. The Caldera (2017)
8. Return of the Temujai (2019)
9. The Stern Chase (2022)

=== Jesse Parker ===
1. Storm Peak (2009)
2. Avalanche Pass (2010)

=== Adult novels ===
- The Grey Raider (2015)
