= Garry Disher =

Australian writer

- Born: 15 August 1949 (age 77); Corporate Town of Burra, South Australia
- Occupation: Author
- Writing career
- Years active: 1987–present
- Genres: Mystery fiction, children's fiction
- Notable awards: Ned Kelly Awards

Garry Disher (born 15 August 1949, in Corporate Town of Burra, South Australia) is an Australian author of crime fiction and children's literature. He is a three-time winner of the Ned Kelly Award for Best Novel.

Disher's novels include three series: the Wyatt thrillers about a master thief in Melbourne; the Peninsula Crimes procedurals about Waterloo cops Hal Challis and Ellen Destry on the Mornington Peninsula; and the Hirsch series about police constable Paul Hirschhausen, set in rural South Australia, north of Adelaide.

== Awards ==
- The Canberra Times National Short Story Competition, 1986: winner for "Amateur Hour"
- Children's Book Council of Australia Book of the Year Award, Book of the Year: Younger Readers, 1993: winner for The Bamboo Flute
- IBBY Honour Diploma, Writing, 1994 for The Bamboo Flute
- NBC Banjo Awards, NBC Banjo Award for Fiction, 1996: shortlisted for The Sunken Road
- New South Wales Premier's Literary Awards, Ethnic Affairs Commission Award, 1999: shortlisted for The Divine Wind
- Children's Book Council of Australia Book of the Year Award, Book of the Year: Older Readers, 1999: shortlisted for The Divine Wind
- New South Wales Premier's Literary Awards, The Ethel Turner Prize for Young People's Literature, 1999: winner for The Divine Wind
- Deutscher Krimi Preis (German Crime Fiction Award), International, 2000: winner for Kickback
- Deutscher Krimi Preis (German Crime Fiction Award), International, 2002: winner for The Dragon Man
- Ned Kelly Awards for Crime Writing, Best Novel, 2007: winner for Chain of Evidence
- Ned Kelly Awards for Crime Writing, Best Novel, 2010: winner for Wyatt
- Deutscher Krimi Preis (German Crime Fiction Award), International, 2017: winner for Bitter Wash Road
- Ned Kelly Awards Lifetime Achievement Award, 2018
- Colin Roderick Award, 2020: shortlisted for Peace
- Ned Kelly Awards for Crime Writing, Best Novel, 2021: winner for Consolation
- Colin Roderick Award, 2021: shortlisted for Consolation
- Colin Roderick Award, 2025: shortlisted for Sanctuary

== Bibliography ==
=== Novels ===
- Steal Away (1987)
- The Stencil Man (1988)
- The Sunken Road (1996)
- Past the Headlands (2001)
- Play Abandoned (2011)
- Under the Cold Bright Lights (2017)
- Her (2017)
- The Way It Is Now (2021)
- Sanctuary (2024)

==== Crime series – The Wyatt novels ====
- Kickback (1991)
- Paydirt (1992)
- Deathdeal (1993)
- Crosskill (1994)
- Port Vila Blues (1996)
- The Fallout (1997)
- Wyatt (2010)
- The Wyatt Butterfly (2010: omnibus containing Port Vila Blues and The Fallout)
- The Heat (2015)
- Kill Shot (2018)

==== Crime series – The Challis and Destry novels, aka the Peninsula Crimes series ====
- The Dragon Man (1999)
- Kittyhawk Down (2003)
- Snapshot (2005)
- Chain of Evidence (2007)
- Blood Moon (2009)
- Whispering Death (2012)
- Signal Loss (2016)

==== Crime series – The Paul "Hirsch" Hirschhausen novels ====
- Bitter Wash Road (2013) published in 2014 as Hell to Pay in the US
- Peace (2019) published by Text Publishing
- Consolation (2020) published by Text Publishing
- Day's End (2022) published by Text Publishing
- Mischance Creek (2025)

=== Short story collections ===
- Approaches (1981)
- The Difference to Me (1988)
- Flamingo Gate (1991)
- Straight, Bent and Barbara Vine (crime stories, 1997)

=== Young adult ===
- Blame the Wind (1995)
- Restless : Stories of Flight & Fear (1995)
- The Half Dead (1997)
- The Apostle Bird (1997)
- The Divine Wind (1999)
- From Your Friend, Louis Deane (2000)
- Moondyne Kate (2001)
- Eva's Angel (2003)
- Two-Way Cut (2004)

=== Children's ===
- The Bamboo Flute (1992)
- Ratface (1993)
- Ermyntrude Takes Charge (1995)
- Walk Twenty, Run Twenty (1996)
- Maddie Finn (2002)
- Switch Cat (1994)

=== Edited ===
- The Man Who Played Spoons (1987)
- Personal Best (1989)
- Personal Best 2 (1991)
- Below the Waterline (1999)

=== Non-fiction ===
- Wretches and Rebels: The Australian Bushrangers (1981)
- Writing Fiction: An Introduction to the Craft (1983)
- Bushrangers (1984)
- Total War: The Home Front, 1939-1945 (1985)
- Australia Then & Now (1987)
- Writing Professionally: The Freelancer's Guide to Writing and Marketing (1989)
- Writing Fiction: An Introduction to the Craft (revised edition) (2001)
