= The Dragon Man =

1999 novel by Garry Disher

- First edition
- Author: Garry Disher
- Language: English
- Series: Challis/Destry
- Genre: Crime novel
- Publisher: Allen and Unwin, Australia
- Publication date: 1999
- Publication place: Australia
- Media type: Print (hardback & paperback)
- Pages: 239 pp
- ISBN: 1-86508-253-8
- OCLC: 222522653
- Preceded by: -
- Followed by: Kittyhawk Down

The Dragon Man is a 1999 crime novel by the Australian author Garry Disher.

This is the first novel in the author's "Challis/Destry" series of crime novels, followed by Kittyhawk Down (2003), Snapshot (2005), Chain of Evidence (2007), Blood Moon (2009), Whispering Death (2011) and Signal Loss (2016).

== Awards ==
- Deutscher Krimi Preis (German Crime Fiction Award), International, 2002: winner

== Critical reception ==
In Australian Book Review, J. R. Carroll was impressed with Disher's sense of place noting that he "presents the reader with a convincingly detailed local scenario, in the style of Ruth Rendell's Kingsmark, or Colin Dexter's Oxford." The review concluded that the novel "sets a high standard for what looks like a terrific new series in the making."

Kirkus Reviews commented that the novel doesn't feel like the start of a new series "thanks to fully formed characters and wall-to-wall mysteries".
