= Kittyhawk Down =

2003 novel by Garry Disher

- First edition
- Author: Garry Disher
- Language: English
- Series: Challis/Destry
- Subject: Crime novels
- Publisher: Allen & Unwin
- Publication date: 2003
- Publication place: Australia
- Media type: Book
- Pages: 275
- ISBN: 1-86508-981-8
- Preceded by: The Dragon Man
- Followed by: Snapshot

Kittyhawk Down is a crime novel by Australian Garry Disher published in 2003 by Allen & Unwin.

This is the second novel in the author's "Challis/Destry" series of crime novels, following The Dragon Man (1999).

== Synopsis ==
Homicide Squad Inspector Hal Challis, of the Peninsula Police Force, is investigating the disappearance of a two-year-old girl and the death of an unidentiofied drowning victim.

== Critical reception ==
Reviewing the novel for The Age newspaper, Diane Dempsey noted the " plot, which makes for compulsive reading, is also complex." She called the novel "taut and terrific" and "crime fiction at its best."

Publishers Weekly noted that while "Disher is not yet in the same league as a Peter Robinson or an Ian Rankin, fans of those authors will find much to like in this dark whodunit."

== Publication history ==
After the novel's initial publication in Australia by Allen & Unwin in 2003 it was reprinted as follows:

- Soho Press, USA, 2005
- Text Publishing, Australia, 2006
- Bitter Lemon Press, UK, 2008

The novel was also translated into German in 2005.
