= 2014 in Australian literature =

This article presents a list of the historical events and publications of Australian literature during 2014.

== Events ==
- The State Library of Queensland takes over the running the Queensland Literary Awards which had previously been run by a group of volunteers.
- The Voss Literary Prize is awarded for the first time.

== Major publications ==
=== Literary fiction ===
- Michael Mohammed Ahmad – The Tribe
- Belinda Alexandra – Sapphire Skies
- Emily Bitto – The Strays
- Peter Carey – Amnesia
- Elizabeth Harrower – In Certain Circles
- Sonya Hartnett – Golden Boys
- Mark Henshaw – The Snow Kimono
- Janette Turner Hospital – The Claimant
- Wendy James – The Lost Girls
- Sofie Laguna – The Eye of the Sheep
- Joan London – The Golden Age
- Suzanne McCourt – The Lost Child
- Liane Moriarty – Big Little Lies
- Gerald Murnane – A Million Windows
- Omar Musa – Here Come the Dogs
- Favel Parrett – When the Night Comes
- Christine Piper – After Darkness
- Craig Sherborne – Tree Palace
- Inga Simpson – Nest
- Graeme Simsion – The Rosie Effect
- Christos Tsiolkas – Merciless Gods
- Rohan Wilson – To Name Those Lost

=== Short stories ===
- Ceridwen Dovey – Only the Animals
- Ellen van Neerven – Heat and Light

=== Children's and Young Adult fiction ===
- Trace Balla – Rivertime
- Karen Foxlee – Ophelia and the Marvellous Boy
- Morris Gleitzman – Loyal Creatures
- Kerry Greenwood – Gallipoli (illustrated by Annie White)
- Andy Griffiths – The 52-Storey Treehouse
- Rebecca James – Cooper Bartholomew is Dead
- Ambelin Kwaymullina – The Lost Girl
- Alison Lester – Noni the Pony Goes to the Beach
- Rebecca Lim – The Astrologer's Daughter
- Doug MacLeod – Tigers on the Beach
- John Marsden – South of Darkness
- Alice Pung – Laurinda
- Diana Sweeney – The Minnow
- Claire Zorn – The Protected

=== Crime ===
- Honey Brown – Through the Cracks
- Peter Corris – Silent Kill
- Candice Fox – Eden
- Katherine Howell – Deserving Death
- Barry Maitland – Crucifixion Creek
- P. M. Newton – Beams Falling
- Malla Nunn – Present Darkness
- Michael Rowbotham – Life or Death
- Jock Serong – Quota

=== Science Fiction and Fantasy ===
- Trudi Canavan – Thief's Magic
- Kate Forsyth – Wolves of the Witchwood
- Patrick Holland – Navigatio
- Juliet Marillier – The Cracks in the Kingdom
- Garth Nix – Clariel
- Matthew Reilly – The Great Zoo of China
- John A. Scott – N

=== Drama ===
- Michael Gow – Once in Royal David's City

=== Poetry ===
- Judith Beveridge – Devadatta's Poems
- Lesbia Harford – Collected Poems : Lesbia Harford (edited by Oliver Dennis)
- Gwen Harwood – The Best 100 Poems of Gwen Harwood
- John Kinsella – Sack
- Geoffrey Lehmann – Poems 1957–2013
- Jennifer Maiden – Drones and Phantoms
- David Malouf – Earth Hour
- Chris Wallace-Crabbe – My Feet are Hungry

=== Biographies ===
- Bob Brown – Optimism : Reflections on a Life of Action
- Phil Butterss – An Unsentimental Bloke : The Life and Works of C. J. Dennis
- Matthew Condon – Jacks and Jokers
- Robert Dessaix – What Days Are For
- Rafael Epstein – Prisoner X
- Julia Gillard – My Story
- Dino Hodge – Don Dunstan : Intimacy and Liberty : A Political Biography
- John Howard – The Menzies Era : The Years that Shaped Modern Australia
- Erik Jensen – Acute Misfortune: The Life and Death of Adam Cullen
- Madonna King – Hockey : Not Your Average Joe
- Elizabeth Morrison – David Syme : Man of the Age
- Mandy Sayer – The Poet's Wife
- David Walsh – A Bone of Fact

=== Non-fiction ===
- Sophie Cunningham – Warning: The Story of Cyclone Tracy
- Paul Kelly – Triumph and Demise: The Broken Promise of a Labor Generation
- Bruce Pascoe – Dark Emu
- Sam Vincent – Blood & Guts

== Awards and honours ==
Note: these awards were presented in the year in question.

=== Lifetime achievement ===
| Award | Author |
|---|---|
| Christopher Brennan Award | Alan Wearne |
| Patrick White Award | Brian Castro |

=== Literary ===
| Award | Author | Title | Publisher |
|---|---|---|---|
| ALS Gold Medal | Alexis Wright | The Swan Book | Giramondo Publishing |
| Colin Roderick Award | Michael Wilding | Wild Bleak Bohemia : Marcus Clarke, Adam Lindsay; Gordon and Henry Kendall - A Documentary | Australian Scholarly |
| Indie Book Awards Book of the Year | Richard Flanagan | The Narrow Road to the Deep North | Random House |
| Nita Kibble Literary Award | Kristina Olsson | Boy Lost: A Family Memoir | University of Queensland Press |
| Stella Prize | Clare Wright | The Forgotten Rebels of Eureka | Text Publishing |
| Victorian Prize for Literature | Jennifer Maiden | Liquid Nitrogen | Giramondo Publishing |

=== Fiction ===
==== International ====
| Award | Author | Title | Publisher |
|---|---|---|---|
| Man Booker Prize | Richard Flanagan | The Narrow Road to the Deep North | Random House |

==== National ====
| Award | Author | Title | Publisher |
|---|---|---|---|
| Adelaide Festival Awards for Literature | Frank Moorhouse | Cold Light | Vintage Books |
| The Australian/Vogel Literary Award | Christine Piper | After Darkness | Allen & Unwin |
| Barbara Jefferis Award | Margo Lanagan | Sea Hearts | Allen & Unwin |
| Barbara Jefferis Award | Fiona McFarlane | The Night Guest | Penguin |
| Indie Book Awards Book of the Year – Fiction | Richard Flanagan | The Narrow Road to the Deep North | Random House |
| Indie Book Awards Book of the Year – Debut Fiction | Hannah Kent | Burial Rites | Pan Macmillan |
| Miles Franklin Award | Evie Wyld | All The Birds, Singing | Random House |
| Prime Minister's Literary Awards | Steven Carroll | A World of Other People | Fourth Estate |
| Prime Minister's Literary Awards | Richard Flanagan | The Narrow Road to the Deep North | Random House |
| New South Wales Premier's Literary Awards | Michelle de Kretser | Questions of Travel | Allen & Unwin |
| Queensland Literary Awards | Richard Flanagan | The Narrow Road to the Deep North | Random House |
| Victorian Premier's Literary Award | Alex Miller | Coal Creek | Allen & Unwin |
| Voss Literary Prize | Fiona McFarlane | The Night Guest | Penguin Group (Australia) |
| Western Australian Premier's Book Awards | Richard Flanagan | The Narrow Road to the Deep North | Vintage Books |

=== Children and Young Adult ===
==== National ====
| Award | Category | Author | Title | Publisher |
|---|---|---|---|---|
| Children's Book of the Year Award | Older Readers | Fiona Wood | Wildlife | Pan MacMillan |
| Children's Book of the Year Award | Younger Readers | Catherine Jinks | City of Orphans: A Very Unusual Pursuit | Allen & Unwin |
| Children's Book of the Year Award | Picture Book | Freya Blackwood, text Irema Kobald | My Two Blankets | Little Hare, Hardie Grant Egmont |
| Children's Book of the Year Award | Early Childhood | Libby Gleeson, illus. Freya Blackwood | Go to Sleep, Jessie! | Little Hare, Hardie Grant Egmont |
| Indie Book Awards Book of the Year | Children's & YA | Alison Lester | Kissed by the Moon | Penguin |
| New South Wales Premier's Literary Awards | Children's | Katrina Nannestad | The Girl Who Brought Mischief | HarperCollins |
| New South Wales Premier's Literary Awards | Young People's | AJ Betts | Zac and Mia | Text Publishing |
| Victorian Premier's Literary Award | Young Adult Fiction | Barry Jonsberg | My Life as an Alphabet | Allen and Unwin |

=== Crime and Mystery ===
==== National ====
| Award | Category | Author | Title | Publisher |
|---|---|---|---|---|
| Davitt Award | Novel | Honey Brown | Dark Horse | Penguin Books |
| Davitt Award | Young Adult novel | Karen Foxlee | The Midnight Dress | University of Queensland Press |
| Davitt Award | Children's novel | Jen Storer | Spooked! | HarperCollins |
| Davitt Award | True crime | Anna Krien | Night Games: Sex, Power and Sport | Black Inc |
| Davitt Award | Debut novel | Hannah Kent | Burial Rites | Pan Macmillan |
| Davitt Award | Readers' choice | Hannah Kent | Burial Rites | Pan Macmillan |
| Ned Kelly Award | Novel | Adrian McKinty | In The Morning I'll Be Gone | Allen and Unwin |
| Ned Kelly Award | First novel | Candice Fox | Hades | Random House, Australia |
| Ned Kelly Award | True crime | John Saffran | Murder in Mississippi | Hamish Hamilton |
| Ned Kelly Award | Lifetime achievement | Not awarded | | |

=== Science fiction ===
| Award | Category | Author | Title | Publisher |
|---|---|---|---|---|
| Aurealis Award | Sf Novel | Marianne de Pierres | Peacemaker | Angry Robot |
| Aurealis Award | Sf Short Story | Thoraiya Dye | "Wine, Women, and Stars" | Analog |
| Aurealis Award | Fantasy Novel | Juliet Marillier | Dreamer's Pool | Pan Macmillan Australia |
| Aurealis Award | Fantasy Short Story | Angela Slatter | "St Dymphna's School for Poison Girls" | Review of Australian Fiction, Volume 9, Issue 3 |
| Aurealis Award | Horror Novel | Justine Larbalestier | Razorhurst | Allen and Unwin |
| Aurealis Award | Horror Short Story | Angela Slatter | "Home and Hearth" | Spectral Press (Home and Hearth) |
| Aurealis Award | Young Adult Novel | Jaclyn Moriarty | The Cracks in the Kingdom | Pan Macmillan Australia |
| Aurealis Award | Young Adult Short Story | Dirk Flinthart | "Vanilla" | Twelfth Planet Press (Kaleidoscope) |
| Ditmar Award | Novel | Robert Hood | Fragments of a Broken Land: Valarl Undead | Wildside Press |
| Ditmar Award | Best Novella or Novelette | Kirstyn McDermott | "The Home for Broken Dolls" | Caution: Contains Small Parts (Twelfth Planet Press) |
| Ditmar Award | Best Short Story | Cat Sparks | "Scarp" | The Bride Price (Ticonderoga Publications) |

=== Poetry ===
| Award | Author | Title | Publisher |
|---|---|---|---|
| Adelaide Festival Awards for Literature | Lisa Jacobson | The Sunlit Zone | 5 Islands Press |
| Anne Elder Award | Vanessa Page | Confessional Box | Walleah Press |
| Mary Gilmore Prize | Rose Lucas | Even in the Dark | UWA Publishing |
| Prime Minister's Literary Awards | Melinda Smith | Drag Down to Unlock or Place an Emergency Call | Pitt Street Poetry |
| New South Wales Premier's Literary Awards | Fiona Hile | Novelties | Hunter |
| Queensland Literary Awards | David Malouf | Earth Hour | University of Queensland Press |
| Victorian Premier's Literary Award | Jennifer Maiden | Liquid Nitrogen | Giramondo Publishing |
| Western Australian Premier's Book Awards | Paul Hetherington | Six Different Windows | UWA Publishing |

=== Drama ===
| Award | Category | Author | Title | Publisher |
|---|---|---|---|---|
| New South Wales Premier's Literary Awards | Script | Kris Mrksa | Devil's Dust | Australian Broadcasting Corporation |
| Patrick White Playwrights' Award | Award | Debra Thomas | The Man's Bitch | Sydney Theatre Company |
| Patrick White Playwrights' Award | Fellowship | Kate Mulvany | | |
| Victorian Premier's Literary Award | Drama | Patricia Cornelius | Savages | Playlab |

=== Non-Fiction ===
| Award | Category | Author | Title | Publisher |
|---|---|---|---|---|
| Adelaide Festival Awards for Literature | Non-Fiction | Kate Richards | Madness: A Memoir | Penguin Books |
| Indie Book Awards Book of the Year | Non-Fiction | David Hunt | Girt | Black Inc. |
| National Biography Award | Biography | Alison Alexander | The Ambitions of Jane Franklin: Victorian Lady Adventurer | Allen & Unwin |
| New South Wales Premier's Literary Awards | Non-Fiction | Kristina Olsson | Boy, Lost: A Family Memoir | University of Queensland Press |
| New South Wales Premier's Literary Awards | Non-Fiction | Michael Fullilove | Rendezvous with Destiny | Penguin Books |
| New South Wales Premier's History Awards | Australian History | Joan Beaumont | Broken Nation: Australians in the Great War | Allen & Unwin |
| New South Wales Premier's History Awards | Community and Regional History | Ian Hoskins | Coast: A History of the New South Wales Edge | NewSouth |
| New South Wales Premier's History Awards | General History | John Gascoigne | Encountering the Pacific in the Age of Enlightenment | Cambridge University Press |
| New South Wales Premier's History Awards | Young People's | Nadia Wheatley, illustrated by Ken Searle | Australians All | Allen & Unwin |
| Queensland Literary Awards | Non-Fiction | Paul Ham | 1914: The Year the World Ended | Random House Australia |
| Victorian Premier's Literary Award | Non-fiction | Henry Reynolds | Forgotten War | NewSouth |

== Deaths ==
- 14 February – Marshall Browne, novelist (born 1935)
- 20 March – Joan O'Hagan, crime novelist (born 1926)
- 10 April – Doris Pilkington Garimara, novelist (born c.1937)
- 17 July – Liam Davison, novelist and critic (born 1957)
- 19 September – Rod Milgate, playwright and painter (born 1934)
- 8 October – Morris Lurie, novelist (born 1938)
- 3 November – Michael Fitzgerald Page, writer and publisher (born 1922 in England)
- 1 December – Rocky Wood, horror writer and researcher (born 1959 in New Zealand)

== See also ==
- 2014 in Australia
- 2014 in literature
- 2014 in poetry
- List of years in Australian literature
- List of years in literature
- List of Australian literary awards
