= Gerard Doyle =

English actor and audiobook narrator

Gerard Doyle is an English actor and audiobook narrator. He has won 1 Audie Award and 35 Earphone Awards. AudioFile named him a Golden Voice Narrator.

== Biography ==
Doyle was born to Irish parents and was born and raised in England. He presently lives with his wife and two children in Sag Harbor, New York.

Aside from narrating audiobooks, Doyle teaches theatre at a private school.

== Awards and honors ==
=== Awards ===
Year	Title	Author	Award	Result	Ref.
2000	A Star Called Henry (1999)	Roddy Doyle	Earphone Award	Winner	
2002	One for My Baby (2001)	Tony Parsons	Earphone Award	Winner	
2003	The Untouchable (2001)	Gerald Seymour	Earphone Award	Winner	
2004	Eragon (2003)	Christopher Paolini	Earphone Award	Winner	
2004	Dead I Well May Be (2003)	Adrian McKinty	Earphone Award	Winner	
2005	Conrad's Fate (2005)	Diana Wynne Jones	Earphone Award	Winner	
2005	Eldest (2005)	Christopher Paolini	Earphone Award	Winner	
2005	Hidden River (2005)	Adrian McKinty	Earphone Award	Winner	
2005	The Ninth Life of Louis Drax (2004)	Liz Jensen	Earphone Award	Winner	
2005	The Torment of Others (2004)	Val McDermid	Earphone Award	Winner	
2006	The Dead Yard (2006)	Adrian McKinty	Earphone Award	Winner	
2006	Eldest (2005)	Christopher Paolini	Audie Award for Package Design	Finalist	
2006	Hidden River (2005)	Adrian McKinty	Audie Award for Mystery	Finalist	
2006	The Looking Glass Wars (2004)	Frank Beddor	Earphone Award	Winner	
2007	The Bloomsday Dead (2007)	Adrian McKinty	Earphone Award	Winner	
2007	The Dead Yard (2006)	Adrian McKinty	Audie Award for Best Male Narrator	Finalist	
2007	The Dead Yard (2006)	Adrian McKinty	Audie Award for Thriller or Suspense	Winner	
2007	Seeing Redd (2007)	Frank Beddor	Earphone Award	Winner	
2008	Mothers and Sons (2008)	Colm Tóibín	Earphone Award	Winner	
2009	Archenemy (2009)	Frank Beddor	Earphone Award	Winner	
2009	Brisingr (2008)	Christopher Paolini	Audie Award for Audiobook of the Year	Finalist	
2009	The Ghosts of Belfast (2009)	Stuart Neville	Earphone Award	Winner	
2009	Hater (2009)	David Moody	Earphone Award	Winner	
2009	Time Quake (2009)	Linda Buckley-Archer	Earphone Award	Winner	
2009	Let the Great World Spin (2009)	Colum McCann	Earphone Award	Winner	
2010	Selected Shorts: A Touch of Magic	Jeffrey Archer	Audie Award for Audiobook Adaptation	Finalist	
2011	And Thereby Hangs a Tale	Jeffrey Archer	Audie Award for Short Stories or Collections	Finalist	
2012	The Cold Cold Ground (2012)	Adrian McKinty	Earphone Award	Winner	
2012	E. Aster BunnyMund and the Warrior Eggs at the Earth’s Core (2012)	William Joyce	Earphone Award	Winner	
2012	Toothiana (2012)	William Joyce	Earphone Award	Winner	
2013	Inheritance (2011)	Christopher Paolini	Audie Award for Young Adult Title	Finalist	
2013	Fyre (2013)	Angie Sage	Earphone Award	Winner	
2013	Torn from Troy (2011)	Patrick Bowman	Earphone Award	Winner	
2014	In the Morning I'll Be Gone (2014)	Adrian McKinty	Earphone Award	Winner	
2015	In the Morning I'll Be Gone (2014)	Adrian McKinty	Audie Award for Thriller or Suspense	Finalist	
2015	Gun Street Girl (2015)	Adrian McKinty	Earphone Award	Winner	
2015	Splinter the Silence (2015)	Val McDermid	Earphone Award	Winner	
2016	Gun Street Girl (2015)	Adrian McKinty	Audie Award for Mystery	Finalist	
2016	Twisted River (2016)	Siobhan MacDonald	Earphone Award	Winner	
2017	The First Day (2017)	Phil Harrison	Earphone Award	Winner	
2017	The Gold-Son (2017)	Carrie Anne Noble	Earphone Award	Winner	
2017	Police at the Station and They Don't Look Friendly (2017)	Adrian McKinty	Earphone Award	Winner	
2018	The Marylebone Drop (2018)	Mick Herron	Earphone Award	Winner	
2018	The Stars My Destination (1956)	Alfred Bester	Earphone Award	Winner	
2019	A Bitter Feast (2019)	Deborah Crombie	Earphone Award	Winner	
2019	The Way Home (2019)	Mark Boyle	Earphone Award	Winner	

=== Honors ===
AudioFile named Doyle a Golden Voice Narrator.

Year	Title	Honor	Ref.
2003	Eragon (2002) by Christopher Paolini	AudioFile Best of Children's	
2008	Brisingr (2008) by Christopher Paolini	AudioFile Best of Young Adult	
2008	Mothers and Sons (2008) by Colm Tóibín	AudioFile Best of Fiction	
2008	Seeing Redd (2007) by Frank Beddor	AudioFile Best of Children's	
2010	Time Quake (2009) by Linda Buckley-Archer	AudioFile Best of Children's	
2012	The Cold Cold Ground (2012) by Adrian McKinty	AudioFile Best of Mystery & Suspense	
2012	E. Aster BunnyMund and the Warrior Eggs at the Earth’s Core (2012) by William Joyce	AudioFile Best of Children's	
2012	Toothiana (2012) by William Joyce	AudioFile Best of Children's	
2013	Torn from Troy (2011) by Patrick Bowman	AudioFile Best of Young Adult	
2014	In the Morning I’ll Be Gone (2014) by Adrian McKinty	AudioFile Best of Mystery & Suspense	
2015	Gun Street Girl (2015) by Adrian McKinty	AudioFile Best of Mystery & Suspense	
2016	Twisted River (2016) by Siobhan MacDonald	AudioFile Best of Mystery & Suspense	
2017	The Gold-Son (2017) by Carrie Anne Noble	AudioFile Best of Young Adult	
2019	The Marylebone Drop (2018) by Mick Herron	AudioFile Best of Mystery & Suspense	

== Filmography ==
Year	Title	Role(s)	Note
1990	The Bold and the Beautiful	Barry Hawkins	12 episodes
1994	The Knock	Michael Mullvany	1 episode
1990-1996	The Bill	Ted Holmes / Ken Glover / Tea Bar Proprietor	3 episodes
1997	Brass Eye		1 episode
1997	The Brittas Empire	Eamonn	1 episode
1998	2point4 Children	Cabbie	1 episode
1999	Agnes Browne	Traditional Musician	
2000-2001	Law & Order	Bill Connelly / Jeremy Ryder	2 episodes
2006	The Day My Towers Fell	Fireman	
