= Eucharis =

Eucharis may refer to:

== Organisms ==
genera

- Eucharis (plant), a genus of monocotyledons
- Eucharis (wasp), type genus of the family Eucharitidae
- an invalid name for the bivalve genus Basterotia
- an invalid name for the ctenophore genus Leucothea

species

- the ammonite Trimarginites eucharis
- the beetle Neocolpodes eucharis
- the butterfly Delias eucharis
- the gastropod Triphora eucharis
- the velvet worm Akinothele eucharis
- the trilobite Nevadella eucharis

== In the arts ==
- The ballet Euthyme et Eucharis, by Georges Jean Noverre, 1775
- Eucharis (fiction), a nymph from a fictional adaptation of Greek mythology
- Eucharis, a poem by Reginald F. Statham
- "Portrait D'Eucharis", a poem by Antoine Bertin
- A character in:
  - The novel Roman Death by Joan O'Hagan, 1988
  - The German play Sappho: A Tragedy in Five Acts by Franz Grillparzer
  - A Eucharis is mentioned briefly by Ennio Quirini VISCONTI, in Iconographie Grèque (1809) as being an emancipated actress performing in Greek plays at Rome during the first century AD (p.320, Vol 1). There is debate over when she lived. She died young, perhaps only 14 years old. Some lyrics and poems attest to her charm and talent.

== Other uses ==
- Saint Walpurga, also known as Eucharis
- The asteroid 181 Eucharis
