= Lighthouse Keepers =

Lighthouse keepers are people who keep watch at a lighthouse.

Lighthouse Keepers may also refer to:

- Lighthouse Keepers (band), an Australian country and indie pop band
- "The Lighthouse Keeper", a 2020 song by Sam Smith
- The Lighthouse Keepers (novel), a 2008 book in Adrian McKinty's Lighthouse trilogy
- The Lighthouse Keepers (film), a 1929 French silent drama film
