= Blood and Guts =

Blood and Guts may refer to:

- AEW Blood and Guts, an annual professional wrestling event by All Elite Wrestling (AEW)
  - Blood and Guts match
- Blood and Guts (film), a 1978 Canadian sports drama
- Blood & Guts (book), a 2014 non-fiction book about modern whaling
- Blood and Guts, an album by jazz pianist Mal Waldron
- Blood & Guts, an early title for the 2006 horror spoof Stupid Teenagers Must Die!
- Blood 'N Guts, a 1986 video game by Greve Graphics
- Blood and Guts, an autobiography by bodybuilder Dorian Yates

== See also ==
- Old Blood and Guts, a nickname for George S. Patton
- Africa Blood and Guts, a 1966 Italian film also known as Africa Addio
