= Only the Animals =

Only the Animals may refer to:

- Only the Animals (film), 2019 French film
- Only the Animals (short story collection), 2014 book by Ceridwen Dovey
