= 181 Eucharis =

Main-belt asteroid

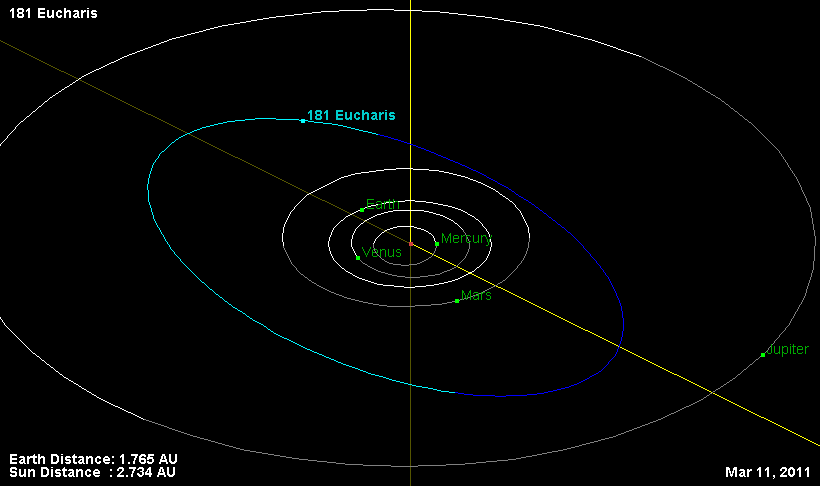
- Orbital diagram

Discovery
- Discovered by: Pablo Cottenot
- Discovery date: 2 February 1878

Designations
- Pronunciation: /ˈjuːkərɪs/
- Named after: Eucharis
- Alternative designations: A878 CB; 1906 GA
- Minor planet category: Main belt

Orbital characteristics
- Epoch 31 July 2016 (JD 2457600.5)
- Uncertainty parameter 0
- Observation arc: 123.63 yr (45157 d)
- Aphelion: 3.7664 AU (563.45 Gm)
- Perihelion: 2.49280 AU (372.918 Gm)
- Semi-major axis: 3.12958 AU (468.179 Gm)
- Eccentricity: 0.20347
- Orbital period (sidereal): 5.54 yr (2022.2 d)
- Average orbital speed: 16.64 km/s
- Mean anomaly: 32.3207°
- Mean motion: 0° 10^{m} 40.879^{s} / day
- Inclination: 18.890°
- Longitude of ascending node: 143.224°
- Argument of perihelion: 318.943°
- Earth MOID: 1.53686 AU (229.911 Gm)
- Jupiter MOID: 1.47086 AU (220.038 Gm)
- T_{Jupiter}: 3.099

Physical characteristics
- Dimensions: 106.66±2.2 km
- Mass: (1.69±0.58)×10^{18} kg (Note: Calculated from its standard gravitational parameter GM = 0.113±0.039 km^{3}/s^{2}.)
- Mean density: 2.10 g/cm^{3} (Note: Assuming a diameter of 115 km.)
- Synodic rotation period: 52.23 h (2.176 d)
- Geometric albedo: 0.1135±0.005^{4}
- Spectral type: S (Tholen); Xk (Bus)
- Absolute magnitude (H): 7.84

181 Eucharis is a large, slowly rotating main-belt asteroid that was discovered by French astronomer Pablo Cottenot on February 2, 1878, from Marseille Observatory. It was his only asteroid discovery. This object was named after Eucharis, a nymph from the 17th-century novel Les Aventures de Télémaque. It is orbiting the Sun at a distance of 3.13 AU with a moderate eccentricity of 0.20 and an orbital period of 5.54 years.

In the Tholen classification system, it is categorized as a stony S-type asteroid, while the Bus asteroid taxonomy system lists it as an Xk asteroid. Photometric observations of this asteroid at the Goat Mountain Astronomical Research Station in Rancho Cucamonga, California during 2007 gave a light curve with a leisurely rotation period of 52.23 ± 0.05 hours. Based on infrared measurements, it has a diameter of 116 km.

This object is the namesake of a family of 149–778 asteroids that share similar spectral properties and orbital elements; hence they may have arisen from the same collisional event. All members have a relatively high orbital inclination. In the case of 181 Eucharis, the orbital plane is inclined at an angle of 18.9° to the plane of the ecliptic.
