= The Farewell of Telemachus and Eucharis =

Painting by Jacques-Louis David

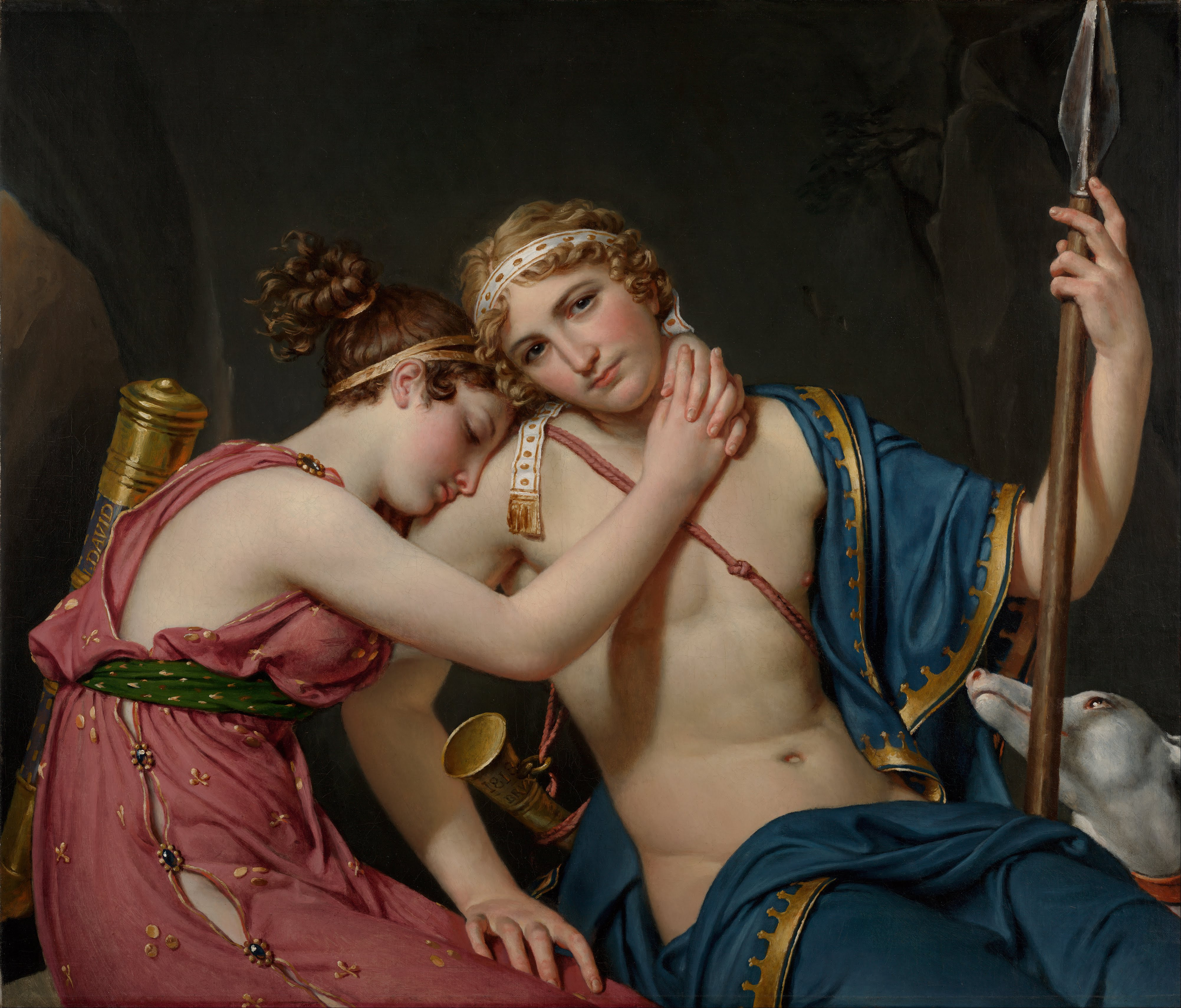
- Artist: Jacques-Louis David
- Year: 1818
- Medium: Oil on canvas
- Dimensions: 88 cm × 103 cm (35 in × 41 in)
- Location: Getty Center, Los Angeles

The Farewell of Telemachus and Eucharis is a painting from 1818 by Jacques-Louis David, now in the J. Paul Getty Museum in Los Angeles, California. Painted during David's exile in Brussels, it was purchased by the Count von Schönborn-Wiesentheid. It depicts Telemachus and Eucharis, two characters in François Fénelon's 1699 novel Les Aventures de Télémaque, inspired by Homer's Odyssey. The artist's last painting of a couple from mythology, it is a pendant painting to his Love and Psyche.

== Background ==
=== Commission and purchase ===
David began The Farewell of Telemachus and Eucharis after his 1816 exile to Brussels, following the Bourbon return to the French throne. David may have started the painting on his own initiative, or an unknown patron may have suggested the subject to him. At some point between 1817 and early 1818, while David was at work on the painting, the Count von Schönborn heard about the project. He visited David's new studio in Brussels to discuss purchasing the work. After Schönborn agreed to acquire the painting, an announcement was made in L'Oracle, a Brussels newspaper. It read: "This painting is destined for a great lord from Bavaria for whom it was made." The statement highlighted that a prominent figure would own the work while maintaining the Count's anonymity.

=== Artistic goals ===
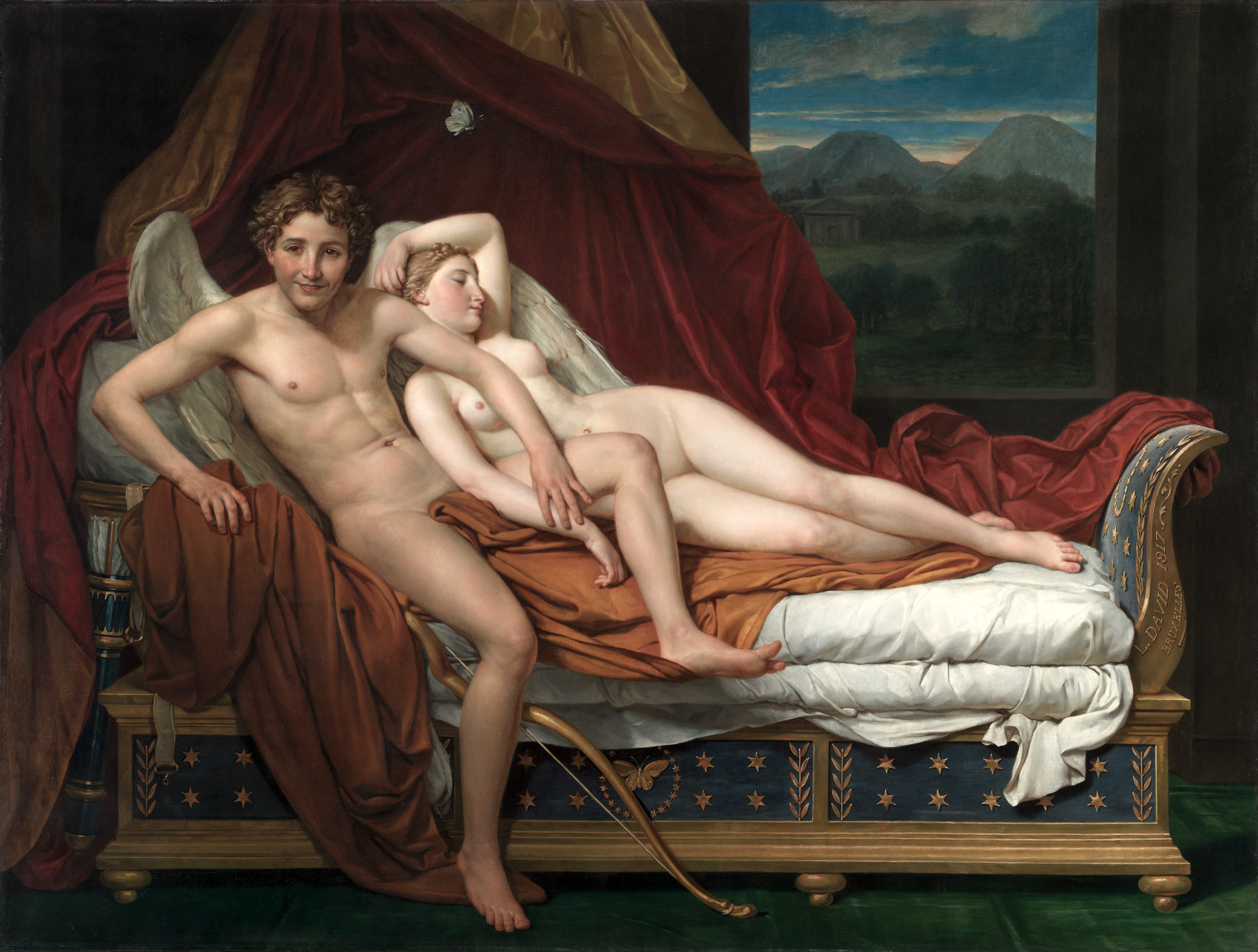
David's Love and Psyche

To ensure that his figures would appear as lifelike as possible, David based both Telemachus and Eucharis on live models. Though the scene is based on Les Aventures de Télémaque, the painting does not depict a particular event from the story. According to the art historian Mary Vidal, the work was meant instead to capture the "courtly and heartfelt affection" between the two lovers and to provide "an allegory for life's journey" by showing both Telemachus's yearning and Eucharis's longing for a better understanding of self. Fénelon's work is said to be inspired by Homer's Odyssey, and the classical tradition informed both the style and subject matter of David's The Farewell of Telemachus and Eucharis. Prior to this painting, David completed various works depicting mythological scenes such as Love and Psyche, which similarly depicts a mythical couple. Though Love and Psyche focuses much more on sexual desire than longing and emotional connection, it resembles Telemachus and Eucharis in its treatment of the figures and use of bold colors.

== Exhibition ==
Before being delivered to the Count von Schönborn, the painting was exhibited in a variety of settings. It was first displayed to the public at the Société Royale des beaux-arts et de littérature de Gand in June of 1818. The exhibition was intended to last for approximately one week, but Pierre-Guillaume-Jean van Huffel, president of the Ghent academy, asked David for permission to extend the showing. The painting remained in Ghent until June 20. From June 23 to July 12, the painting was displayed in the Musée de Bruxelles as part of a charity event to benefit hospices. The painting was never displayed in Paris, but it was well received during the exhibitions in Ghent and Brussels. Joseph Denis Odevaere, who was one of David's students, wrote a review celebrating the work's "brilliance" and "subtlety of color," describing it as "a work of nature".

== Versions ==
After the completion of David's original painting in 1818, a replica was created in 1822 by Sophie Frémiet. Frémiet, a student of David's, worked on this second version of The Farewell of Telemachus and Eucharis under the original artist's instruction. Frémiet went on to create repetitions of various other works that David painted during his exile in Brussels and studied his work closely as she began establishing herself as an independent artist. Frémiet's replica of The Farewell of Telemachus and Eucharis was purchased in 1822 by Didot, a French publisher. It was then displayed at the 1846 Exposition du Bazar Bonne-Nouvelle in Paris while David's original work was in Germany.

== Style and description ==
=== Style ===
Like many of David's other works, The Farewell of Telemachus and Eucharis is a product of Neoclassicism. The clarity of the figures, classical subject matter, and bold touches of color exemplify the Neoclassical tradition. Uncharacteristic of other Neoclassical works, however, was the abrupt cropping of the figures, which generated both criticism and praise. German writer Georg Christian Braun argued that David's unconventional cropping was "ill-suited for historical compositions." More recent commentary has described the work as "proto-Romantic" for its portrayal of complex emotions.

=== Figures ===
Mary Vidal has argued that David wished to show Telemachus's "catalytic experience of his own humanity," which is a central theme in Fénelon's story. Telemachus is faced with a choice between duty and passion in the story, and David's painting, according to Vidal, depicts the pain that he experiences in giving up his youthful desires to stay with Eucharis. David's focus on the couple and lack of any detailed surroundings forces the viewer to consider the emotions of each figure. The image also depicts a dog gazing upward at Telemachus which draws the viewer's attention to this figure. After close inspection, viewers can identify the longing and sorrow that Telemachus experiences. Telemachus, though making the heroic decision to search for his father, is evidently distraught that he must leave behind Eucharis. Eucharis expresses a similar sorrow and, in her subtle gesture of touching Telemachus's face, gives the work a sense of romantic intensity.

=== Color and clothing ===
David's use of vibrant primary colors set against a dark background draws attention to the main figures. The gold details highlight the quiver and horn that Eucharis and Telemachus hold, indicating that they are hunters. The details also draw upon Greek and Roman art. Eucharis wears hunting gear comparable to Artemis, the goddess of the hunt and chastity. Telemachus, on the other hand, is only partially clothed to remind viewers of Classical heroes, who are often depicted nude. In alluding to figures of Classical virtue, David conveys that the relationship between the figures involves a genuine emotional connection rather than simply sexual desire.

== See also ==
- List of paintings by Jacques-Louis David
