= ArchEnemy =

2009 novel by Frank Beddor

- First edition
- Author: Frank Beddor
- Language: English
- Genre: Fantasy novel
- Publisher: Dial Press
- Publication date: October 15, 2009
- Publication place: United Kingdom
- Media type: Print (hardback & paperback); Audiobook
- Pages: 384 pp (hardcover edition), 400 pp (paperback edition)
- ISBN: 978-0-8037-3156-1
- OCLC: 311262820
- LC Class: PZ7.B3817982 Ev 2009
- Preceded by: Seeing Redd

ArchEnemy is a 2009 science-fiction and fantasy novel by Frank Beddor and the third novel of The Looking Glass Wars trilogy. The book was published on October 15, 2009 by Dial Press and is heavily inspired by Lewis Carroll's 1865 novel Alice's Adventures in Wonderland and its 1871 sequel Through the Looking-Glass.

== Synopsis ==
A stalemate has arisen in the war between Alyss and Redd for control of Wonderland. Redd has lost her imagination, the ability that allows her to control vast amounts of magical power, including illusions, conjuring objects, and remote-viewing locations. With her army of Borderlanders, she falls back from the invasion of Wonderland. Alyss’ forces are saved, but Alyss herself has also lost her imagination. Should there be another attack, they will be unable to stop the assault.

However their reprieve is short, the loss of imagination goads one of the other founding families of Wonderland, the Clubs, into an attempt to seize power. They begin to hold anti-imagination rallies, drawing on the resentments of those who lacked a powerful imagination in the first place. As a result, they foster dissent against Alyss’ throne. Alyss attends one of these rallies in a disguise, attempting to find out the truth of whether the Clubs are plotting against her and also trying to understand the resentment being aimed towards her. She takes only Dodge Anders with her for protection. The Clubs are identified as the ringleaders of the movement, but Alyss is recognized and her capture ordered. In her flight she and Dodge are rescued by Mutty P. Dumphy, a citizen of Wonderland. He helps her hide in a transport which the Clubs use to move those people they have captured with strong imaginations into Limbo coops.

Meanwhile, Hatter Madigan and his daughter Homburg Molly are in mourning over Weaver’s death. However Hatter feels that it is time for them to return to their queen, and so they leave Talon’s Point for Wonderland. As they leave the Blue caterpillar-oracle appears mysteriously and with a cloud of smoke he blows the word ‘you’ at Molly, indicating that the caterpillar-oracles have plans for her. In the enemy camp, due in part to the manipulations of the Green caterpillar-oracle, Arch regains control over the Borderlanders and sends Redd and her companions into flight. Having regained his army and certain that Alyss is also without imagination, he renews the attack on Wonderland.

All hope is not lost however as reports are coming in to Alyss of imagination being returned, the only question is how long will it take to restore Alyss’. Hatter takes Molly to Earths for safety as, still distraught over the death of the mother she knew only shortly, she is unable to resume her duties and protect herself in the coming war.

But Alyss’ powers do not return in time and Wonderland is conquered by Arch, who has sinister plans to once and for all snuff out the power of imagination. Desperate, Redd and Alyss must cooperate despite their feelings toward each other.

So when Alyss returns it is to the middle of a battlefield. Seeing what has happened and the temptation that hold of the crystal heart proves to be, Alyss summons an orbital barrage on Redd’s location, in the process damaging the Crystal Heart. The resulting explosion takes the life of Redd and her followers. This is when the caterpillars appear and reveal that this is what they wanted all along. When the Crystal was broken the power of imagination was freed and now no longer can anyone take control of it. With this they shed their skins, turn into butterflies, and fly away into the sky.

== Reception ==
The School Library Journal praised ArchEnemy, calling it a "must have" and an "excellent and satisfying end". AudioFile Magazine positively reviewed the audiobook version of the novel, awarding it their "AudioFile Earphones Award" for 2009.
