= Pablo Cottenot =

French astronomer

Minor planets discovered: 1
| 181 Eucharis | 2 February 1878 | MPC |

Pablo Cottenot (born 1800) was a 19th-century French astronomer and discoverer of a minor planet.

He worked at Marseille Observatory, but according to Édouard Stephan, Cottenot's astronomy career was brief. He is credited by the Minor Planet Center with the discovery of one minor planet, the outer main-belt asteroid 181 Eucharis, which he named for a nymph of the goddess Calypso.
