= Sapphire Skies =

Historical novel by Belinda Alexandra

- Softcover edition
- Author: Belinda Alexandra
- Language: English
- Genre: Historical romance
- Published: 2014 (HarperCollins)
- Publication place: Australia
- Media type: Print (paperback)
- Pages: 414
- ISBN: 9780732291976
- OCLC: 861376317

Sapphire Skies is a 2014 historical romance by Belinda Alexandra. It is about Lily, an Australian working in Moscow, who discovers the story behind Natasha Azarova, a night witch who disappeared during World War II.

== Publication history ==
- 2014, Australia, HarperCollins ISBN 9780732291976
- 2015, United Kingdom, Simon & Schuster Ltd ISBN 9781471138720

== Reception ==
A reviewer for the Historical Novels Review wrote "This is a fascinating tale about the Soviet female pilots dubbed the “Night Witches” by the Germans and the horrific post-war years under Stalin’s iron fist that are rarely the topic of popular fiction.".

Sapphire Skies has also been reviewed by Good Reading magazine.
