= Tree Palace =

Book by Craig Sherborne

- Author: Craig Sherborne
- Language: English
- Genre: novel
- Publisher: Text Publishing, Australia
- Publication date: 2014
- Publication place: Australia
- English publication date: 26 March 2014
- Media type: Print (Paperback)
- Pages: 288
- ISBN: 9781922147325
- Preceded by: The Amateur Science of Love

Tree Palace (2014) is a novel by Australian author Craig Sherborne. It was shortlisted for the Miles Franklin Award in 2015.

== Plot summary ==
Set in rural western Victoria, this novel deals with a group of itinerants who have congregated around Shane Whittaker. The group makes money by scamming the welfare system, and stripping abandoned buildings (houses, schools, churches and libraries) of their fittings and selling them on the second-hand market.

== Reviews ==
- Peter Pierce in the Sydney Morning Herald noted the novel "is a gently handled comedy that treats enforced and willing marginalisation in an Australia that few of its citizens glimpse."
- Catherine Ford in The Monthly stated that "...if Sherborne ever draws close to a Tim Winton–style picaresque, he keeps well clear of that writer's hymnals of sentiment."

== Awards and nominations ==
- 2015 shortlisted Miles Franklin Literary Award
