= Trace Balla =

Australian children's author

- Born: Australia
- Occupation: Children's author, illustrator
- Years active: 2014–present
- Notable works: Rivertime (2014); Rockhopping (2016); The Heart of the Bubble (2020); Leaf-light (2023)
- Notable awards: Readings Children's Book Prize (2015); Wilderness Society Picture Book Award (2015); CBCA Book of the Year: Young Readers (2017)

Trace Balla is an Australian children's author and illustrator.

Rivertime won the 2015 Readings Children's Book Prize and the Wilderness Society Picture Book Award in the same year. It was shortlisted for both the 2015 Patricia Wrightson Prize for Children’s Literature, NSW Premier's Literary Awards and the 2016 WA Premier’s Book Awards.

Rockhopping was awarded Book of the Year: Young Readers by the Children's Book Council of Australia in 2017. It was shortlisted for the Children's Award in the 2018 Adelaide Awards Festival for Literature.

The Thank You Dish was named a Notable book in the early childhood section by the Children’s Book Council of Australia in 2018.

Landing with Wings was shortlisted for the 2020 Speech Pathology Australia Book of the Year Award for books for eight to ten year olds.

The Heart of the Bubble was published in 2020 and is a graphic novel set during the coronavirus pandemic about "a family’s awakening to what really matters".

Her 2023 book, Leaf-light, was shortlisted for the 2024 Patricia Wrightson Prize for Children's Books, NSW Premier's Literary Awards and the 2024 Children's Book Award, Queensland Literary Awards.

She lives in Castlemaine, Victoria.

== Works ==
- Rivertime, 2014, ISBN 9781743316337
- Shine: A story about saying goodbye, 2015, ISBN 9781743316344
- Rockhopping, 2016, ISBN 9781952533419
- The Thank You Dish, 2017, ISBN 9781760292355
- Landing with Wings, 2020, ISBN 9781760296957
- The Heart of the Bubble, 2020, ISBN 9780648904304
- Leaf-light, 2023, ISBN 9781760526207
