= Jerusalem Lions RFC =

Rugby club in Israel

Lions RFC
- Nickname(s): Lions, Lionesses
- Founded: 1970's
- Location: Jerusalem, Israel
- Chairman: Ziggi Silveman
- Coach(es): Daniel Choen Sabban, Sergio Sandez
- League(s): 2nd division
Team kit

Lions RFC is an Israeli amateur rugby club based in Jerusalem.

== History ==
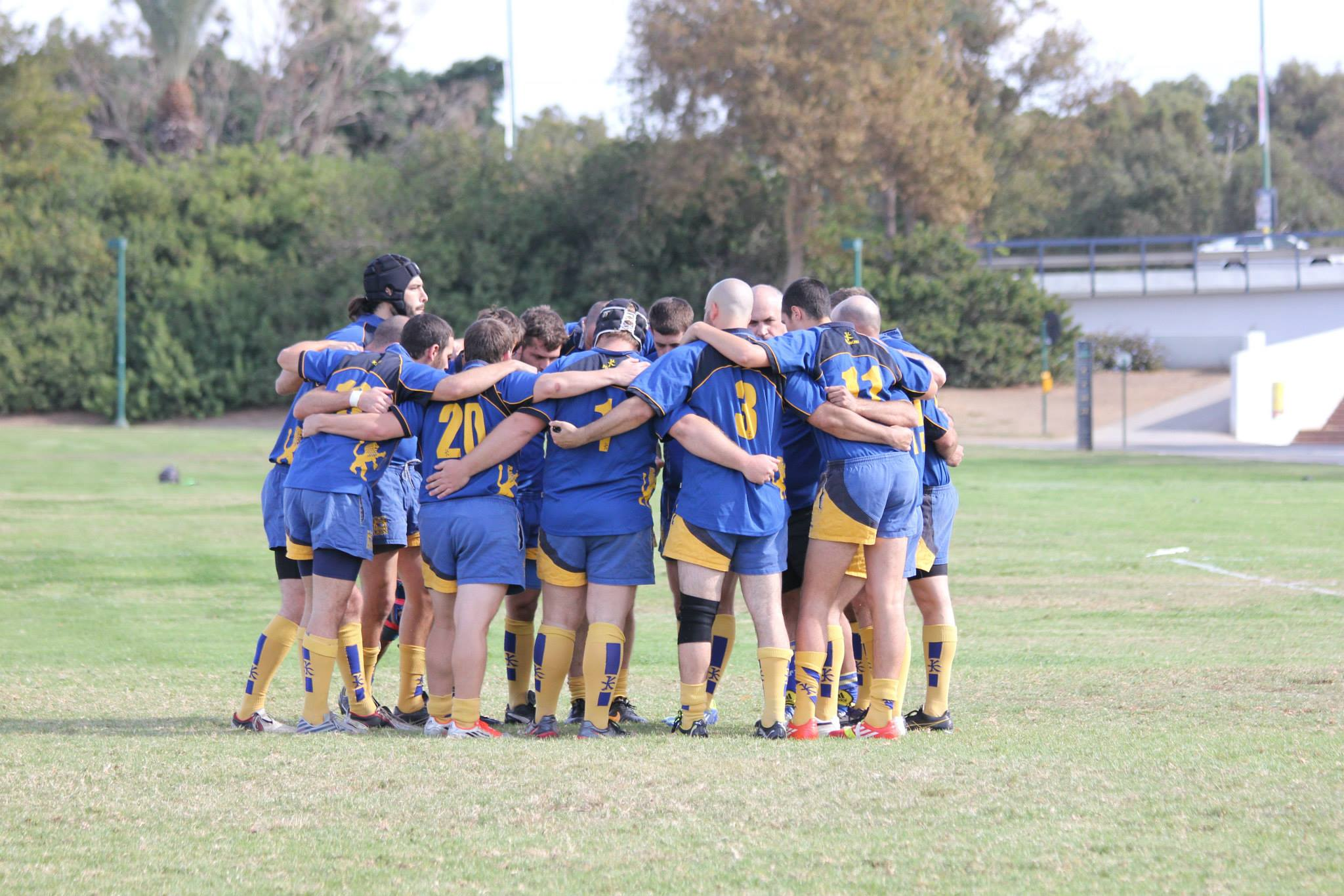
The lion's roar

The Jerusalem Lions RFC was founded in the 1970s by immigrants from South Africa and England. It was strongly associated with HUJI. In 1988, the collaboration with the university came to its end when the field was used for Israel's 50th anniversary celebrations. In 2004 the foundation for development of Rugby in Jerusalem was founded.

In 2013 a visiting Argentinian organisation Rugby Without Borders organised a youth rugby match between Israeli children and Palestinian children, none of whom had previously played rugby. The event was a success with over 100 children taking part. The event was jointly organised by the President of Israel; Shimon Peres.

== The club today ==
The club today has both a men's team and a women's team. The club is composed of players from Kibutz Tzova, students, legacy players mostly from Argentina and foreigners working at the UN or as Journalists.

The men's team uniform is a royal blue shirt, royal blue with yellow flash shorts and bright yellow socks. The kit is produced by Kukri in the United Kingdom. The shirt is currently sponsorless but a recent mutual agreement has been reached with a brewery in Bet Shemesh near Jerusalem named Shapiro beer. Shapiro Beer currently sponsor the training shirts.

== The men's team ==
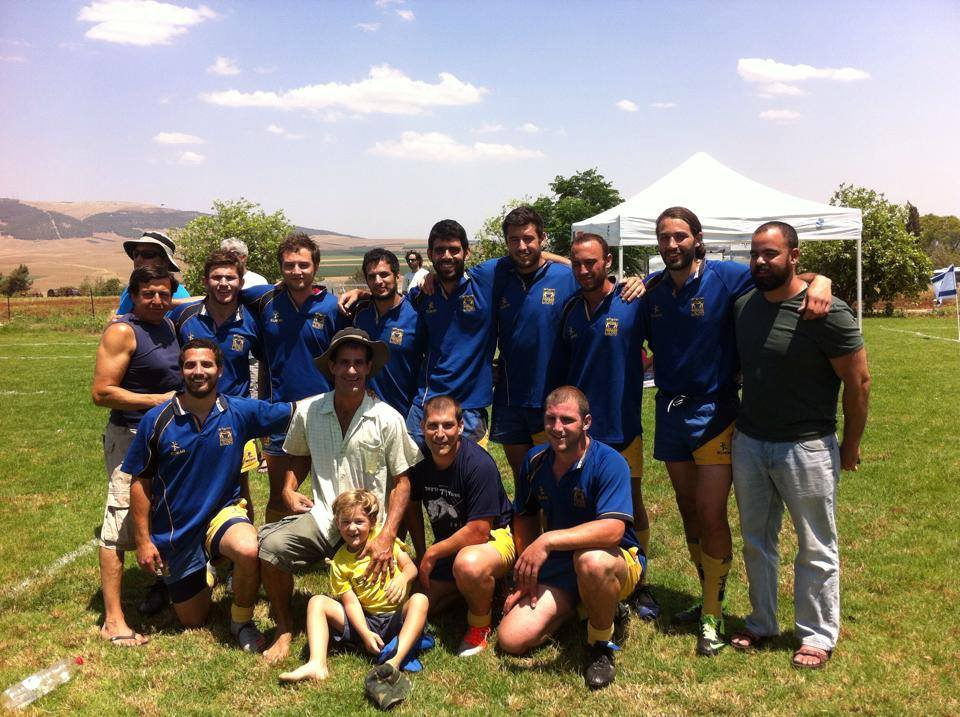
7's 2014 team

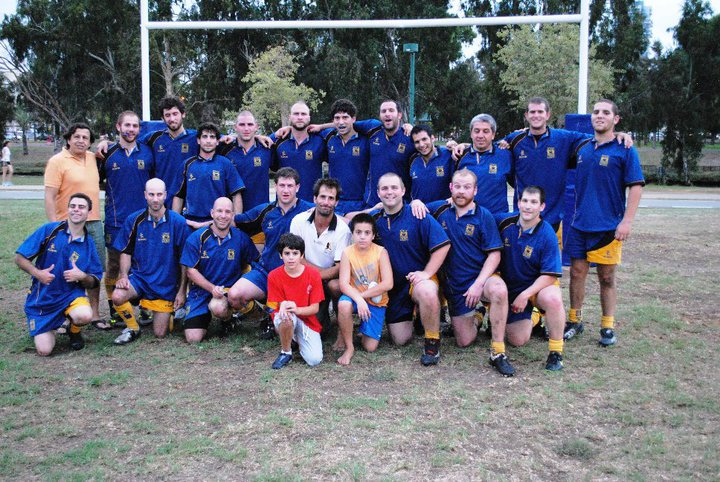
2010 15 Team

The men's team play 15s (XVs) Rugby union in Israel's 2nd division together with Upper Galilee (Galil ole) team and Tel Aviv B Team. This year Jerusalem Lions RFC won the 2nd Division Championship after losing only one game and drawing one game. The team participates in all rugby 7's tournaments throughout the year.

== The women's team ==
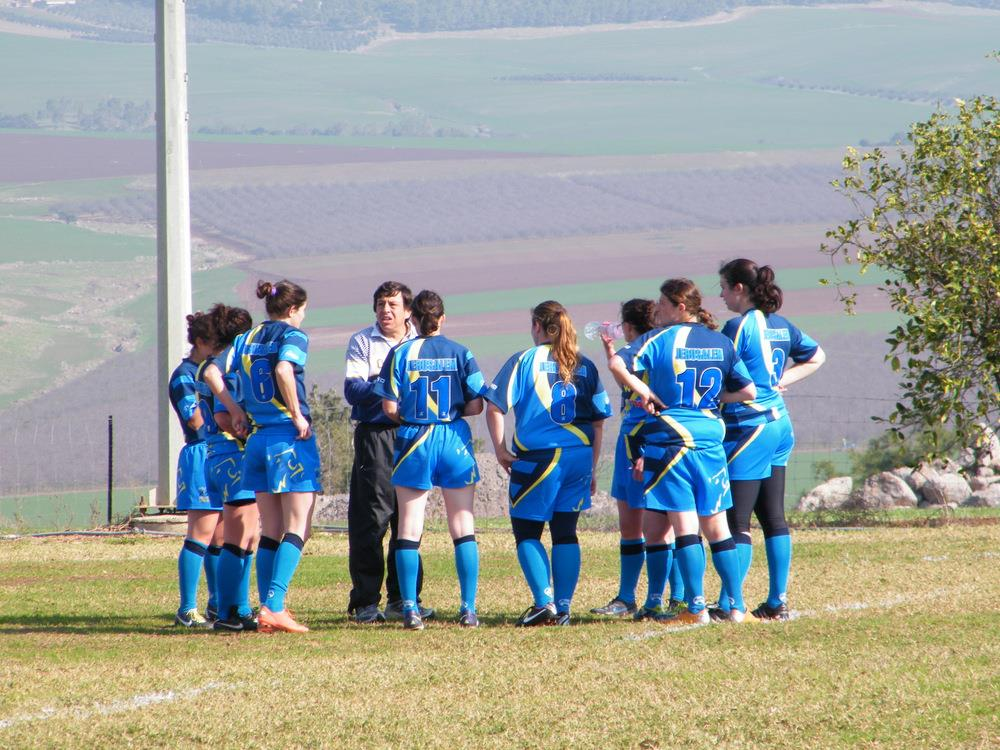
The women

The women's team play Rugby 7's in both the national league and the regional league. Each year the club makes a notable contribution to the national 7's team. Other women's teams are located in Haifa, Upper Galilee and Tel Aviv.

== Rituals ==
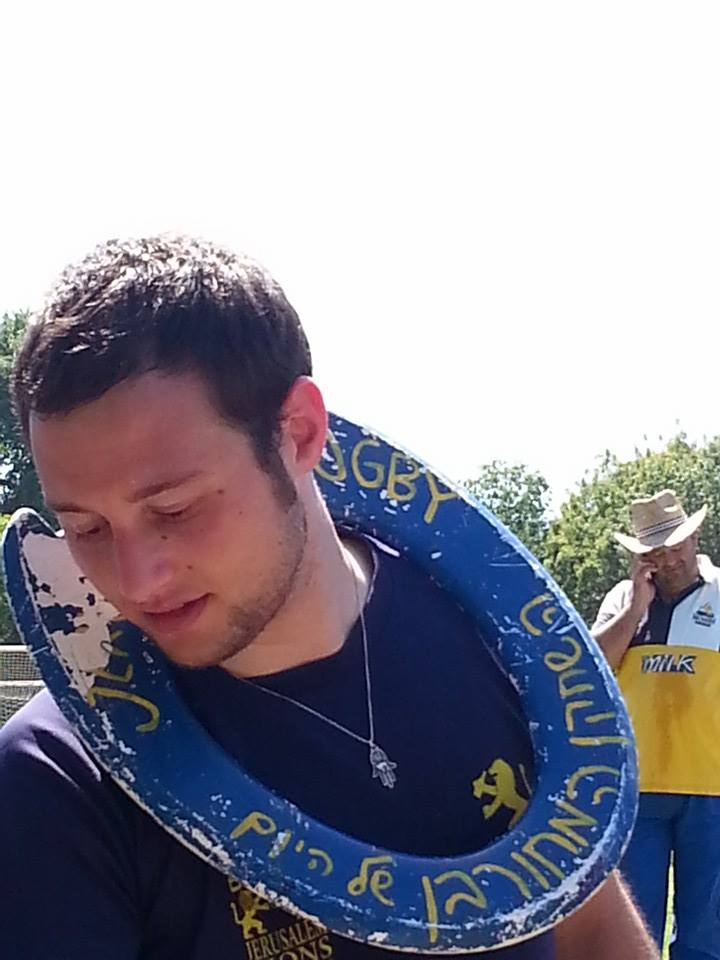
The toilet

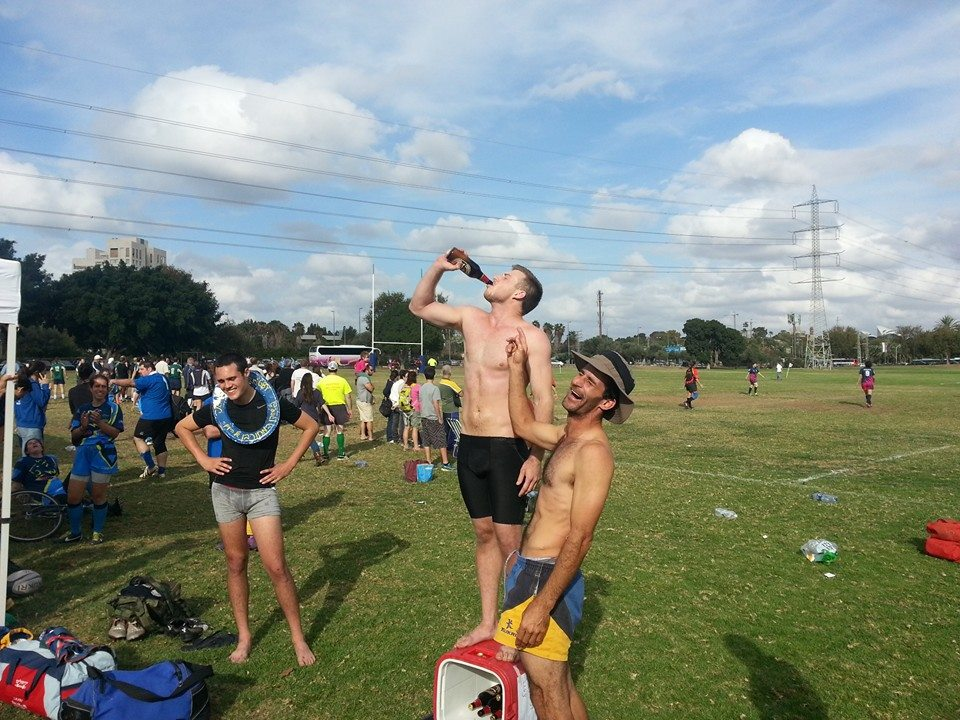
man of the match

It is said that a Rugby match in Jerusalem has 3 halves. The first 2 played on the field and the 3rd "half" off the field, both teams drinking beer, eating BBQ and socialising. Post match the traditional ceremonies begin. The man of the match and the "shittiest player" are awarded their titles and prizes. Downing a beer in less than ten seconds. Higher than the highest mountain, deeper than the deepest sea. Is it a bird don't be absurd. is it a duck who gives a fu** it's... and then sing why was he born so beautiful...
