= Ceridwen Dovey =

South African-Australian writer and anthropologist

- Born: 1980 (age 45–46); Pietermaritzburg, South Africa
- Occupation: Writer
- Writing career
- Period: 2008-present
- Website: ceridwendovey.com

Ceridwen Dovey (born 1980) is a South African and Australian author and social anthropologist. The winner of several awards, she is known for her first novel, Blood Kin (2007), and her 2014 short story collection, Only the Animals. In 2024 she published another collection of short stories, called Only the Astronauts.

== Early years and education ==
Ceridwen Dovey was born in 1980 in Pietermaritzburg, South Africa, and grew up between South Africa (mainly East London) and Australia. Her father received death threats because he taught black students, then illegal under the apartheid regime.

Dovey attended high school in Australia at North Sydney Girls High School, before going to the United States in 1999 to study at Harvard University as an undergraduate, where she completed a joint degree in Anthropology and Visual & Environmental Studies in 2003. During her time at Harvard, Dovey made documentaries that highlighted the relationships between farmers and rural labourers in post-apartheid South Africa. She made a documentary about wine farm labour relations in the Western Cape of South Africa, called Aftertaste, as part of her honours thesis in 2003.

In 2004 Dovey worked briefly for the television programme NOW with Bill Moyers at Channel Thirteen in New York City, before moving to South Africa to study creative writing at the University of Cape Town. She wrote her first novel, Blood Kin, as her thesis for an MA in creative writing under the supervision of poet Stephen Watson, then did her graduate studies in Social Anthropology at New York University.

== Career ==
Dovey moved back to Sydney in 2010. From 2010 to 2015 she worked for the Institute for Sustainable Futures at the University of Technology Sydney.

Dovey's first novel, Blood Kin, was published by Atlantic Books (U.K.) and Penguin Books (Australia; South Africa) in July 2007, and by Viking Press in North America in March 2008. It was published in 15 countries, including Germany, France, Italy, the Netherlands, and Sweden. It was widely reviewed and then shortlisted in 2007 for the Dylan Thomas Prize and the U.K.'s John Llewellyn Rhys Prize for British/Commonwealth authors under the age of 35 and was shortlisted in 2008 for the Commonwealth Writers' Prize for Best First Book (Africa). It tells the story of a fictional military coup from the perspective of the overthrown leader's portraitist, chef, and barber. The novel is deliberately ambiguous in its setting.

Dovey's second book, Only the Animals, is a collection of ten short stories about the souls of ten animals caught up in human conflicts over the last century. It won the inaugural 2014 Readings New Australian Writing Award and the People's Choice for Fiction Award (joint with Joan London's The Golden Age) at the NSW Premier's Literary Awards, as well as the Queensland Literary Awards Steele Rudd Award for a short story collection.

Dovey's third novel, In the Garden of the Fugitives, was published in early 2018.

On J. M. Coetzee was published in October 2018 as part of Black Inc.'s Writers on Writers series.

Life After Truth is Dovey's fourth novel and was published in November 2020.

In 2024 she published a collection of short stories called Only the Astronauts, in which the narrator in each story is an inanimate object in space, including the International Space Station and Voyager 1 spacecraft.

Dovey writes non-fiction for various publications, including The New Yorker and The Monthly.

== Personal life ==
Dovey's sister, Lindiwe Dovey, is Professor of Film and Screen Studies at SOAS University of London.

== Bibliography ==
=== Books ===
- Dovey, Ceridwen (2007). Blood Kin. London: Atlantic Books. ISBN 9781843546573.
- —— (2014). Only the Animals. Melbourne: Hamish Hamilton, an imprint of Penguin Books. ISBN 9781926428581.
- —— (2018). In the Garden of the Fugitives. Melbourne: Hamish Hamilton. ISBN 9781926428598.
- —— (2018). On J. M. Coetzee. Writers on Writers (hardcover ed.). Melbourne: Black Inc. ISBN 9781760640613.
- —— (2019). Inner Worlds, Outer Spaces: The Working Life of Others. Hamish Hamilton. ISBN 9781760895389.
- —— (2020). Life After Truth. Melbourne: Hamish Hamilton. ISBN 9781760895365.
- ——; Bell, Eliza (2022). Mothertongues. Melbourne: Hamish Hamilton. ISBN 9781761043550.
- —— (2024). Only the Astronauts. Melbourne: Hamish Hamilton. ISBN 9781760896775.

== Critical studies and reviews of Dovey's work ==
=== Life After Truth ===
- Taylor. Josephine (January–February 2021). "The science of happiness : a presidential-term dream". Australian Book Review. 428: 41.

== Awards and recognition ==
Dovey was a recipient of a Sidney Myer Creative Fellowship, an award of A$160,000 given to mid-career creatives and thought leaders.

- 2009: Named a 5 under 35 nominee by the National Book Foundation
- 2014: Inaugural winner, Readings Prize for New Australian Fiction, for Only the Animals
- 2020: Winner, Bragg UNSW Press Prize for Science Writing, for her article, "True Grit", published in Wired
- 2020: Winner, Finkel Foundation Eureka Prize for Long-Form Science Journalism
