= Christine Piper =

Australian writer

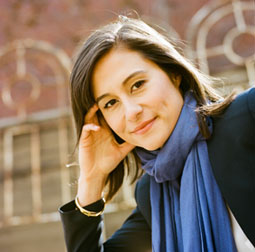
- Photo by Timothy Lee
- Born: 1979 (age 46–47); Seoul, South Korea
- Education: Doctor of Creative Arts
- Occupations: Writer and editor
- Writing career
- Genre: Literary Fiction
- Website: www.christinepiper.com

Christine Piper is an Australian author and editor.

Her first novel, After Darkness, won the 2014 The Australian/Vogel Literary Award and was shortlisted for the 2015 Miles Franklin Award. She won the 2014 Calibre Prize for an Outstanding Essay for "Unearthing the Past".

== Biography ==
Christine Piper was born in Seoul, South Korea in 1979, to an Australian father and a Japanese mother. Her family lived in Seoul for a year due to her father's work (her sister was born in Tokyo). She moved to Australia when she was one, and was raised and educated in Sydney. She has lived in Japan several times, teaching English and studying Japanese, most recently in 2010. She has also lived in the US for an extended period; the first of her two children was born in New York.

Piper attended Cheltenham Girls High School where she excelled at English and Visual Arts. She placed seventh in NSW in her final exams for the 1997 Higher School Certificate in Visual Arts. She went on to study a Bachelor of Media majoring in Print Media and Cultural Studies at Macquarie University where she attained a 3.8 GPA in her final year. While at university, Piper was an editorial assistant for Sydney's Child Magazine, a film columnist for Voiceworks Magazine and a features editor for Silverlimbo Magazine. After graduating, she worked as a magazine copy editor and a freelance writer. She then studied Bachelors of Communications (Creative Writing/Cultural Studies) at the University of Technology, Sydney achieving First Class Honours, and later creative writing at the Iowa Writers' Workshop and again at the University of Technology, Sydney, where she wrote After Darkness for her Doctor of Creative Arts degree. After Darkness won the 2014 Vogel's Literary Award for manuscripts by writers under the age of 35, and was shortlisted for the 2015 Miles Franklin Literary Award.

She won the 2014 Calibre Prize for an Outstanding Essay for "Unearthing the Past", which she also wrote for her Doctor of Creative Arts degree.

She received a 2017 Australia Council individual artist grant and was the 2019 Copyright Agency's New Writer's Fellow at the University of Technology, Sydney.

She is currently working on her second novel, about two Australians and a pair of Queensland lungfish who journey to the Chicago World's Fair of 1933.

== Bibliography ==
=== Fiction ===
- Piper, Christine (2012). "Once more, with feeling". Seizure. 4.
- "Stranded" in Things That Are Found In Trees and Other Stories (Margaret River Press, 2012)
- Piper, Christine (2014). After Darkness. Crows Nest, NSW: Allen & Unwin.

=== Non-fiction ===
- "Unearthing the Past" (Australian Book Review, April 2014)
- "Christine Piper on the journey that changed her" (QANTAS Magazine, July 2016)

=== Editing ===
- UTS Writers' Anthology: I can see my house from here, Brandl & Schlesinger (2010)

=== Interviews ===
- "Open Page with Christine Piper". Australian Book Review. 364: 53. September 2014.

=== Selected critical studies and reviews of Piper's work ===
- Williamson, Geordie (3 May 2014) "At war with his emotions" in The Australian. Review of After Darkness.
- Messer, David (7 June 2014) "Christine Piper's Vogel winner, After Darkness" in The Sydney Morning Herald. Review.
- Steed, Laurie (September 2014). "Chequered past". Australian Book Review. 364: 49. Review of After Darkness.
- Kossew, Sue (May 2017). "Revisiting the Haunted Past: Christine Piper's After Darkness" in "Unfinished Business: Apology Cultures in the Asia-Pacific", Special issue of Australian Humanities Review.

== Awards and nominations ==
- 2015 Miles Franklin Award, shortlisted for After Darkness
- 2015 Dobbie Literary Award, shortlisted for After Darkness
- 2015 Indie Book Awards Book of the Year – Debut Fiction, shortlisted for After Darkness
- 2014 Readings New Australian Writing Award (shortlisted)
- 2014 Guy Morrison Prize for Literary Journalism (winner)
- 2014 The Australian/Vogel's Literary Award (winner)
- 2014 Calibre Prize for an Outstanding Essay (winner)
- 2013 Alice Hayes Writing Fellow at Ragdale (recipient)
- 2011 Margaret River Short Story Competition, Second Prize
