= Only the Animals (short story collection) =

Short story collection by Ceridwen Dovey

- First edition
- Author: Ceridwen Dovey
- Published: 2014
- Publisher: Hamish Hamilton
- ISBN: 978-1-926-42858-1
- Preceded by: Blood Kin

Only the Animals is a 2014 short story collection by Ceridwen Dovey. It is her second book after Blood Kin (2008). It is a collection of ten interrelated short stories about the souls of ten animals caught up in human conflicts over the last century and tells their stories of life and death.

== Notes ==
- Epigraph: "On one side there is luminosity, trust, faith, the beauty of the earth; on the other side, darkness, doubt, unbelief, the cruelty of the earth, the capacity of people to do evil. When I write, the first side is true; when I do not the second is." – Czeslaw Milosz, Road-Side Dog
- Epigraph: Each creature is key to all other creatures, A dog sitting in a patch of sun licking itself, says he, is at one moment a dog and at the next a vessel of revelation." – J. M. Coetzee, Elizabeth Costello

== Critical reception ==
Writing in The Saturday Paper reviewer LS noted: "Two stories into Ceridwen Dovey's Only the Animals, my heart began to sink. I thought that this collection of 10 thematically linked stories, told mainly by the souls of animals killed in human conflict who had close contact with or were inspired by a major writer, could hardly be more ungainly. I saw it as a kind of Watership Down meets The Lovely Bones, with literary cameos to satisfy the smug...By the third story, the glorious “Red Peter’s Little Lady”, however, I realised I'd read the first two stories wrongly and needed to start again from the beginning. I'd entirely misjudged Dovey’s intent. She wasn't expecting us to believe anything...Only the Animals makes much contemporary fiction seem stodgy and grey, and Dovey has put everything on the line here. It’s a remarkable achievement."

In The Australian Book Review Sam Cadman was also impressed with the collection: "The stories are assiduously researched – a list of sources is published on Dovey's website – and the historical and zoographic details are persuasive. Dovey's ambition to address other animal-themed writings can make the style more self-conscious than is the case with her best writing...It may be that ultimately Dovey provokes empathy because her animal subjects are humanised: shape-shifting intermediaries who facilitate visualisation of how humanity might be perceived from some external, yet equivalent perspective...Whether you agree with Dovey's approach to humans and animals or not, no one interested in either will be sorry to have read this book."

== See also ==
- Ceridwen Dovey's author website Accessed 21 February 2008
- 2014 in Australian literature
