= The Looking Glass Wars =

2004 novel by Frank Beddor

- Author: Frank Beddor
- Language: English
- Genre: Fantasy, Novel
- Publisher: Dial Press
- Publication date: 2004 (UK) 2006 (US)
- Publication place: United States
- Media type: Print (Hardback & Paperback); Audio
- Pages: 384 pg (Hardcover), 400 pg (paperback)
- ISBN: 0-8037-3153-1
- OCLC: 64442735
- LC Class: PZ7.B3817982 Lo 2006
- Followed by: Seeing Redd

The Looking Glass Wars is a series of three novels by Frank Beddor, heavily inspired by Lewis Carroll's 1865 novel Alice's Adventures in Wonderland and its 1871 sequel Through the Looking-Glass. The premise is that the two books written by Lewis Carroll are a distortion of the "true story".

The Looking Glass Wars is the first book in the trilogy. It was first released in the United Kingdom in 2004, and released in the United States in 2006. The second book in the trilogy, Seeing Redd, was released in 2007 and the third book, ArchEnemy, was released on October 15, 2009. The series includes a spin-off comic book series entitled Hatter M.

== Plot ==
The premise of the book is that Lewis Carroll's 1865 novel Alice in Wonderland was fiction, but that the character Alice and the world of Wonderland is real. Carroll's novel is said to have been inspired by the images, ideas, and names related by Alice to the author, whom she had requested to make a book of her personal history.

The book's prologue tells of Reverend Charles Lutwidge Dodgson showing Alice Liddell (who claims her name to be spelled "Alyss") his manuscript for Alice's Adventures Under Ground. Alyss is shocked by the book's contents and refuses to speak to Dodgson ever again.

The story then begins many years earlier, on Alyss' seventh birthday in Wonderland, which is ruled by imagination and is the source of all imagination for all other worlds. Wonderland features a class system similar to that seen in England during the 17th century. The government is a queendom with an advising Parliament dominated by a playing card based hierarchy, with the Heart family at the top. The Wonderland queen is a member of the Heart family, and the parliament is composed of reigning members of the Spades, Clubs, and Diamonds.

Wonderland, ruled by Queen Genevieve Heart, is still recovering from a civil war between White Imagination and Black Imagination which ended twelve years prior to the beginning of the story. Alyss' companions include tutor Bibwit Harte (whose name is an anagram of "White Rabbit"), the queen's bodyguard Hatter Madigan, Alyss' best friend Dodge Anders, childhood troublemaker Jack of Diamonds, and military commander General Doppelganger.

During a bloody coup d'état led by Alyss' Aunt Redd, the enemy of White Imagination, Alyss flees Wonderland in the company of Hatter Madigan, with Redd's top feline assassin (called only "The Cat") in pursuit. Queen Genevieve and Redd battle and Genevieve is killed by Redd.

Hatter and Alyss enter an inter-dimensional gateway called the Pool of Tears, from which they emerge into Earth. Alyss is separated from Hatter during the journey; she arrives in London, England, and Hatter in Paris, France. Alyss gets adopted by the Liddell family, whereby she is given the name "Odd Alice" for her tales about Wonderland. When Dodgson plagiarizes her stories rather than write them verbatim, she shuns her imagination and resolves to believe Wonderland is false.

Meanwhile, Hatter is searching for Alyss. Along his search he trails people alight with the glow of White Imagination, knowing that Alyss would most likely glow the brightest. After thirteen years of searching for the lost princess, Hatter finds Dodgson's book; he uses this to track down the author, and in turn, find Alyss, who is now twenty years of age. Upon arrival in Oxford, Hatter discovers that the princess is to marry to Prince Leopold. Before Hatter is able to rescue the princess, he is unexpectedly wounded and driven back to Wonderland. Dodge himself goes into the Pool of Tears and rescues Alyss.

For thirteen years, the people of Wonderland have suffered under Redd's dictatorial reign of Black Imagination. The Wonderlanders still loyal to White Imagination have gathered within the Whispering Woods and have been surviving on their own, led by military leader General Doppelganger and Bibwit Harte. They are called the "Alyssians" and stage unsuccessful battles and skirmishes against Redd's forces.

When Alyss returns to Wonderland, she is immediately taken in by the Alyssians. With the assistance of the Alyssians, Alyss is able to find and locate the Looking-Glass Maze. When Alyss passes through the maze, she finds her Heart Scepter and moves on to fight against, and defeat, Redd. While Alyss and Redd battle, Dodge fights against The Cat; Dodge kills The Cat three times, leaving The Cat with one life left. Redd, seeing her imminent failure against Alyss, throws herself into the Heart Crystal, who is followed by The Cat.

Alyss, having defeated Black Imagination, is crowned as the Queen of Wonderland.

== Characters ==
=== Main characters ===
- Alyss Heart (Alice Liddell): Based on both Alice of Alice's Adventures in Wonderland and the real-life Alice Liddell. The Princess of Wonderland forced to flee to the real world when her Aunt Redd takes over Wonderland. Alyss eventually comes to believe Wonderland to be nothing but a dream. She also appears to be based on Lily, the White's Queen daughter from Through the Looking-Glass.
- Hatter Madigan: Based loosely on the Hatter from Carroll's books, he is the queen's bodyguard and the leading member of Wonderland's security force, the Millinery. During Redd's attack on the Palace, Hatter ordered by Genevieve to watch over Alyss until she is old enough to rule. After their escape from Redd's coup, Hatter and Alyss are separated. He spends the next thirteen years searching for her. After finding Alyss, he returns to Wonderland to help her in defeating Redd. Hatter Madigan has his own comic book series regarding his adventures searching for Alyss
- Redd Heart (born Rose Heart): She is the main villain of the book and Alyss' aunt; based on both the Red Queen and the Queen of Hearts. As Genevieve's sister, she was raised and educated within Heart Palace. She is a user of Black Imagination, a negative form of magic, and responsible for the murder of Alyss' parents. Since that time, Redd has crowned herself Queen and rules over Wonderland promoting evil and Black Imagination. After a battle with her niece, she jumps into the Heart Crystal, disappearing, leaving Alyss and the rest of her friends to wonder whether she is alive or dead. Redd was born under the name Rose as the daughter of Queen Theodora and King Tyman of Wonderland. Worried that Rose would make a tyrannical monarch, Theodora and Tyman removed her from succession and named Rose's sister, Genevieve, heir to the throne. Being removed from succession took a heavy toll on Redd/Rose. In a fit of madness, she murdered her mother in her sleep before Theodora could announce her decision to the general public. Redd/Rose assumed the throne. However her sister, Genevieve, aware that Redd had killed their mother, defeated her sister and banished her to the Chessboard Desert.
- Dodge Anders: Son of Sir Justice Anders, Captain of the palace guard, and a soldier of Alyssians with the purpose of killing The Cat. In the second and third books he is given the role of Queen Alyss' love interest.
- Bibwit Harte: The tutor to the Heart family. His name is an anagram of White Rabbit. After Alyss and Hatter disappear, he seems to work for Redd, but secretly helps the Alyssians. When Alyss returns to Wonderland he joins the Alyssians openly.
- The Cat: Redd's assassin, loosely based on the Cheshire Cat from Carroll's original books. He kills Sir Justice Anders and attempts to pursue Alyss and Hatter when they escape from Wonderland. He ordinarily resembles a bipedal feline equipped with melée weapons, but can take the form of a kitten. He possesses nine lives. Over the course of the book, he loses all but one of these, variously to Hatter, Genevieve, Redd, or Dodge. At the last minute, he follows Redd into the Heart Crystal.
- General Doppelgänger: The commander of the Royal Army, made up of equal parts General Doppel and General Gänger. When split he is referred to as 'they', rather than 'he', and each is able to act independently of the other. General Doppelganger can also split into multiple Generals, of which each acts on his own free will. He is based on Tweedledee and Tweedledum.
- Homburg Molly: She is half civilian and half Milliner. She helps the Alyssians to find the Looking-Glass Maze, and eventually fights along their side in the battle of Mount Isolation. When Alyss is crowned as queen, Molly becomes her bodyguard.
- Jack of Diamonds: The Jack of Diamonds is intended to become Alyss's fiancé when they are both still children. Jack acts as a member of the Alyssians while delivering information to Redd about their activities. During the final battle with Queen Redd, his betrayals are discovered by Dodge, and he is subsequently taken prisoner by Alyss. He is most likely based on the Knave of Hearts.
- Prince Leopold: Prince Leopold is infatuated with Alyss. Based on the real-life Prince Leopold.

=== Supporting characters ===
- Queen Genevieve Heart: Queen of Wonderland, mother of Alyss, younger sister of Redd Heart, and wife of Nolan Heart. She is the ruler of Wonderland prior to Redd's coup. She is killed by Redd on Alyss's seventh birthday. She appears to be based on the White Queen, with her title being based on the Queen of Hearts.
- King Nolan Heart: King of Wonderland, husband of Genevieve, and father of Alyss. He is killed by Redd on Alyss's seventh birthday. He appears to be based on the White King. The sequel reveals he was in a relationship with Genevieve's sister Redd Heart/Rose Heart when they were teenagers, but when Redd/Rose was disowned by her parents and denied the crown, Nolan turned his attentions on Genevieve, Rose's sister, who had become the new heiress to the throne.
- King Arch: Ruler of Boarderland, a kingdom to which King Nolan is sent to attempt to gain as an ally against Redd. King Arch's views on women and Wonderland's status as a queendom makes him reluctant to ally with Wonderland.
- Sir Justice Anders: Captain of the Palace Guard and father of Dodge Anders. He is killed by The Cat on Alyss's seventh birthday. He is based loosely on the White Knight.
- Blue Caterpillar: Based on the Caterpillar from Alice's Adventures in Wonderland, Blue Caterpillar is the head of six oracle-like caterpillars who act as guardians to the Heart Crystal. Blue tells Alyss how to find the Looking Glass Maze.
- The Liddells: Alyss's adopted family. Reverend and Mrs. Liddell of Oxford and their three daughters, Edith, Lorina, and Rhoda. The children's governess is Miss Prickett. None of the Liddells believe that Alyss tells the truth when referring to Wonderland.
- Reverend Charles Lutwidge Dodgson: The mathematics lecturer of Christ Church and author of Alice's Adventures Underground under the penname Lewis Carroll which, in The Looking Glass Wars, he wrote based upon Alyss's recounting of her life in Wonderland.

== Spin-offs ==
=== Hatter M limited series ===
Hatter M is a spin-off comic book limited series, written by Frank Beddor and Liz Cavalier with art by Ben Templesmith. The series follows Hatter Madigan's search for the missing princess.

An additional special issue (numbered 2.5) was given away at summer conventions in 2006. A scanned copy of this issue can be viewed at IGN Comics as a part of a Hatter M-centric story published September 1, 2006.

The second Hatter M graphic novel, named Mad With Wonder, was released October 15, 2009, with art by Finnish artist Sami Makkonen. Hatter explores America during the Civil War and is committed to an asylum. In Volume 3, The Nature of Wonder, Hatter Madigan searches America's wild west in search of Alyss and confronts his past.

== Writing ==
Beddor commissioned Doug Chiang to help him write the novel by creating art work of some of the places and peoples in the novel based on Beddor's descriptions. "I had my concept artist on this shoulder and Lewis Carroll on this shoulder, so I had a lot of helpers," said Beddor.

== Character references ==
Most of the characters featured in the series are based on the original characters from Lewis Carroll's novels.

Humpty Dumpty is featured in the third book in the series, ArchEnemy, as a character named Mutty P. Dumphy.

The Eaglet is referenced in ArchEnemy as a character with the anagram name of Mr. Taegel, a weapons inventor that provides Alice with "spy gear" and is credited with having invented the special mirror barrier that once hid the Alyssian camp.

In the UK edition, Alyss accuses Lewis Carroll of turning General Doppelganger into Tweedledee and Tweedledum while reading Alice's Adventures In Wonderland. This was removed in the US edition as the Tweedle twins originally appeared in Through the Looking-Glass, rather than the first book.
