= Adrian McKinty =

Irish crime novelist and critic

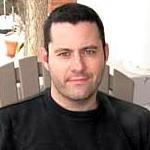
- Born: 1968 (age 57–58); Belfast, Northern Ireland, United Kingdom
- Education: University of Warwick, University of Oxford
- Occupation: Writer
- Spouse: Leah
- Children: Arwynn, Sophie
- Writing career
- Period: 1990s–
- Genres: Crime fiction, young adult fiction
- Notable works: The Chain; The Cold Cold Ground (Sean Duffy series)
- Notable awards: Edgar Award, Theakston's Old Peculier Crime Novel of the Year Award
- Movement: Celtic New Wave in Crime Fiction
- Website: adrianmckinty.blogspot.com officialadrianmckinty.com

Adrian McKinty (born 1968) is a Northern Irish writer of crime and mystery novels and young adult fiction, best known for his 2019 award-winning thriller, The Chain, and the Sean Duffy novels set in Northern Ireland during The Troubles. He is a winner of the Edgar Award, the Theakston Old Peculier Crime Novel of the Year Award, the Macavity Award, the Ned Kelly Award, the Barry Award, the Audie Award, the Anthony Award and the International Thriller Writers Award. He has been shortlisted for the CWA Ian Fleming Steel Dagger and the Grand Prix de Littérature Policière.

== Biography ==
=== Early life ===
McKinty was born in Belfast, Northern Ireland in 1968. The fourth of five children, he grew up in the Victoria area of Carrickfergus, County Antrim. His father was a welder and boilermaker at the Harland and Wolff shipyard before becoming a merchant seaman. He grew up reading science fiction and crime novels by the likes of Ursula Le Guin, J G Ballard and Jim Thompson. He studied law at the University of Warwick and politics and philosophy at the University of Oxford.

After graduating from Oxford in 1993, McKinty moved to New York and found work in a number of occupations: security guard, barman, bookstore clerk, rugby coach, door to door salesman and librarian for the Columbia University Library. In 1999, while his wife studied for a Fulbright in Israel, McKinty played loose head prop forward for the Jerusalem Lions Rugby Club. In 2000, he relocated to Denver, Colorado, to become a high school English teacher.

=== Writing career ===
After writing several short stories, a novella and book reviews, his debut crime novel, Dead I Well May Be, was published by Scribner in 2003. The book was followed by two sequels in what would become to be known as the Michael Forsythe Trilogy. Alongside these, McKinty wrote the three books in his Lighthouse Trilogy, a series of science fiction young adult novels set in New York City, his native Ireland, and the fictional planet Altair.

In 2008 McKinty moved with his family to Melbourne, Australia, to become a full-time writer. He found his greatest success and critical acclaim with the Sean Duffy series, following the eponymous Royal Ulster Constabulary Sergeant during The Troubles, beginning with 2012's The Cold Cold Ground.

In 2019, the author made this comment about that novel: "It didn't sell very well, but it ended up getting the best reviews of my career. I got shortlisted for an Edgar, won a couple of awards, and so then that set me on that path for the next six years of reluctantly, kind of being dragged into writing about Northern Ireland in the 1980s".

The third Duffy book, In the Morning I'll Be Gone, won the 2014 Ned Kelly Award for Best Novel. McKinty has been an especially astute observer of class in fiction.

He also began working as a writer and reviewer for a number of publications including The Guardian, The Sydney Morning Herald, The Washington Post, The Independent, The Australian, The Irish Times and Harpers.

==== Quitting writing and The Chain ====
McKinty quit writing in 2017 after being evicted from his rented house, citing a lack of income from his novels, and instead took work as an Uber driver and a bartender. Upon hearing of his situation, fellow crime author Don Winslow passed some of his books to his agent, the screenwriter and producer Shane Salerno. In a late-night phone call, Salerno persuaded McKinty to write what would become The Chain. Salerno loaned the author ("advance on the advance") $10,000 to help him survive financially during the process.

The stand-alone thriller was inspired by the chain letters of his youth and contemporary reports of hostage exchanges. McKinty returned to writing after the book landed him a six-figure English-language book deal, and was optioned for a film adaptation by Paramount Pictures. In an interview on CBS McKinty talked about never giving up and took the interviewer, Jeff Glor, to Plum Island, Massachusetts, where The Chain is set. The Chain was published in 37 countries. In January 2026, HBO greenlit a limited series adaptation of the novel, with Damon Lindelof serving as showrunner.

==== Reception ====
Patrick Anderson of the Washington Post has praised McKinty as a leading light of the "new wave" of Irish crime novelists along with Ken Bruen, Declan Hughes and John Connolly. He often uses the classic noir tropes of revenge and betrayal to explore his characters' existential quest for meaning in a bleak but lyrically intense universe. Steve Dougherty writing in The Wall Street Journal praised McKinty's use of irony and humour as a counterpoint to the violent world inhabited by McKinty's Sean Duffy character. Liam McIlvanney, writing in the Irish Times, singled out McKinty's lyrical prose style as the defining characteristic of the Duffy series. Some reviewers have criticised the explicit use of violence in his novels. However, in reviewing McKinty's Fifty Grand in The Guardian, John O'Connor called him a "master craftsman of violence and redemption, up there with the likes of Dennis Lehane."

His novel The Dead Yard was selected by Publishers Weekly as one of the 12 Best Novels of 2006. Audible selected Falling Glass as the Best Mystery or Thriller of 2011. In the Morning I'll Be Gone was named as one of the 10 best crime novels of 2014 by the American Library Association.

In 2016, The Guardian included book 5 of the Sean Duffy series, Rain Dogs, about the investigation of a death at Carrickfergus Castle, in their "The best recent thrillers" coverage.

== Awards and honours ==
- 2004 CWA Ian Fleming Steel Dagger Award shortlist for Dead I Well May Be
- 2007 Audie Award for Best Thriller/Suspense for The Dead Yard.
- 2008 Young Hoosier Award and Beehive Award shortlist for The Lighthouse Land
- 2009 World Book Day Award longlist for The Bloomsday Dead
- 2010 Spinetingler Award for Best Novel for Fifty Grand
- 2011 Theakston Old Peculier Crime Novel of the Year Award longlist for Fifty Grand
- 2013 Spinetingler Award for Best Crime Novel for The Cold Cold Ground
- 2013 Prix Du Meilleur Polar shortlist for The Cold Cold Ground
- 2013 Crime Fest Last Laugh Award shortlist for The Cold Cold Ground
- 2013 Ned Kelly Award for Best Crime Novel shortlist for I Hear the Sirens in the Street
- 2014 Barry Award (for crime novels)for Best Mystery Novel (Paperback Original) for I Hear the Sirens in the Street
- 2014 Grand Prix de Littérature Policière shortlist for I Hear the Sirens in the Street
- 2014 Theakston Old Peculier Crime Novel of the Year Award shortlist for I Hear the Sirens in the Street
- 2014 Ned Kelly Award for Best Fiction for In the Morning I'll Be Gone
- 2015 Audie Award For Best Thriller shortlist for In the Morning I'll Be Gone
- 2015 Prix SNCF Du Polar shortlist for The Cold Cold Ground
- 2015 Ned Kelly Award shortlist for Gun Street Girl
- 2015 Boston Globe Best Book of 2015 for Gun Street Girl
- 2015 Irish Times Best Crime Novel of 2015 for Gun Street Girl
- 2016 Edgar Award (Best Paperback Original) shortlist for Gun Street Girl
- 2016 Anthony Award (Best Paperback Original) shortlist for Gun Street Girl
- 2016 Audie Award for Best Mystery shortlist for Gun Street Girl
- 2016 Boston Globe Best Book of 2016 for Rain Dogs
- 2016 Irish Times Best Crime Novel of 2016 for Rain Dogs
- 2016 Theakston Old Peculier Crime Novel of the Year Award shortlist for Rain Dogs
- 2016 Ned Kelly Award shortlist for Rain Dogs
- 2016 CWA Ian Fleming Steel Dagger shortlist for Rain Dogs
- 2017 Edgar Award (Best Paperback Original) for Rain Dogs
- 2017 Barry Award for Rain Dogs
- 2017 Anthony Award (Best Paperback Original) for Rain Dogs
- 2017 Ned Kelly Award for Police at the Station and They Don't Look Friendly
- 2017 CWA Ian Fleming Steel Dagger Award shortlist for Police at the Station and They Don't Look Friendly
- 2017 Boston Globe Best Book of 2017 for Police at the Station and They Don't Look Friendly
- 2018 International Thriller Writers Awards (Best Paperback Original Novel) shortlist for Police at the Station and They Don't Look Friendly
- 2019 Time magazine Books of the Year for The Chain
- 2020 Theakston's Old Peculier Crime Novel of the Year Award 2020 winner for The Chain.
- 2020 Ian Fleming Steel Dagger Award longlist for The Chain; CWA Body in the Library longlist for The Chain
- 2020 International Thriller Writers Award for Best Hardcover Novel, The Chain.
- 2020 Ned Kelly Award for Best International Crime Fiction for The Chain.
- 2020 Macavity Awards for Best Mystery Novel by Mystery Readers International for The Chain.
- 2020 Barry Award (for crime novels) for Best Mystery Novel winner for The Chain.
- 2022 In The Morning I'll Be Gone winner of the Prix Polar Pourpres for Best Mystery Novel
- 2022 Best Thrillers of 2022 for The Island. New York Times
- 2023 Best Thrillers of 2023 for The Detective Up Late. Washington Post
- 2024 Barry Award (for crime novels) nominee for Best Mystery Novel for The Detective Up Late

== Bibliography ==
=== Michael Forsythe Trilogy ===
1. Dead I Well May Be (Scribner) 2003
2. The Dead Yard (Scribner) 2006
3. The Bloomsday Dead (Scribner) 2007

=== The Lighthouse Trilogy ===
1. The Lighthouse Land (Abrams) 2006
2. The Lighthouse War (Abrams) 2007
3. The Lighthouse Keepers (Abrams) 2008

=== The Sean Duffy series ===
1. The Cold Cold Ground (Serpent's Tail) 2012 ISBN 978-1616147167
2. I Hear the Sirens in the Street (Serpent's Tail) 2013 ISBN 978-1616147877
3. In the Morning I'll Be Gone (Serpent's Tail) 2014 ISBN 978-1616148775
4. Gun Street Girl (Serpent's Tail) 2015 ISBN 978-1633880009
5. Rain Dogs (Serpent's Tail) 2016 ISBN 978-1633881303
6. Police at the Station and They Don't Look Friendly (Serpent's Tail) 2017 ISBN 1781256926
7. The Detective Up Late (Blackstone) 2023
8. Hang On St Christopher (Blackstone) 2025
9. The Ghosts Of Saturday Night TBD

Two more Sean Duffy novels to be published by Blackstone Publishing

On a blog post dated July 15, 2021, on his official site, McKinty explains that the 7th Sean Duffy novel (The Detective Up Late) may be out in late 2022. He states that The Detective Up Late is in fact finished and Book 8 (Hang On St Christopher) is pretty much done.

=== Standalone books ===
- Orange Rhymes With Everything (novella) (Morrow) 1998
- Hidden River (Scribner) 2005
- Fifty Grand (Holt) 2009
- Falling Glass (Serpent's Tail) 2011
- Deviant (Abrams) 2011
- The Sun Is God (Serpent's Tail in the UK/Seventh Street Books in the US) 2014
- The Chain (Orion) 2019
- The Island (Little, Brown and Company) 2022

=== As editor ===
- Belfast Noir (Akashic) 2014 with Stuart Neville
