= Frank Beddor =

American novelist

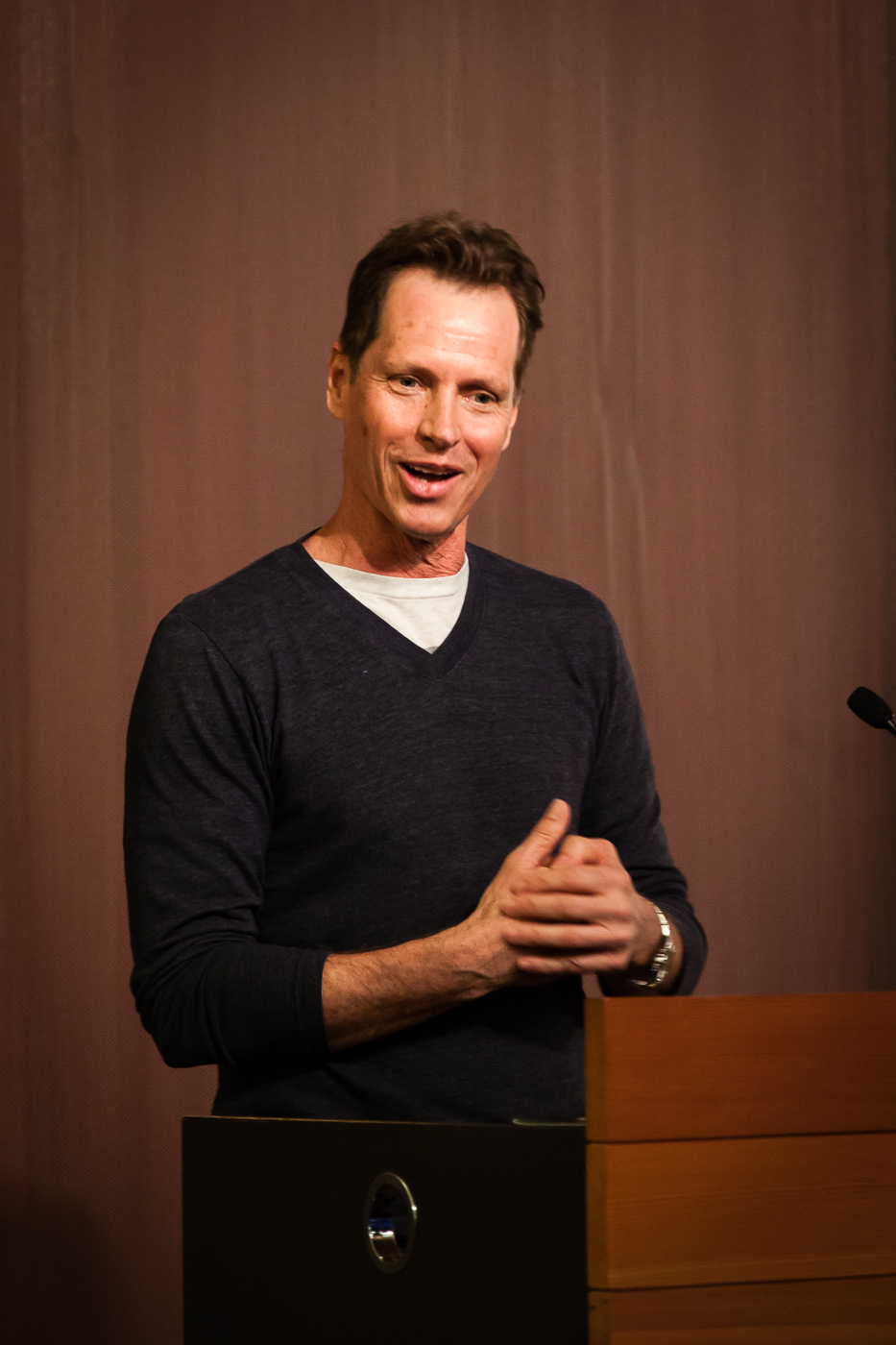
Frank Beddor, studied at Arizona State University in 2016

Frank Beddor (July 31, 1958) is a former American world champion freestyle skier, film producer, actor, stuntman, and author. He worked as a producer on There's Something About Mary and Wicked, and wrote the book The Looking Glass Wars.

== Life and career ==
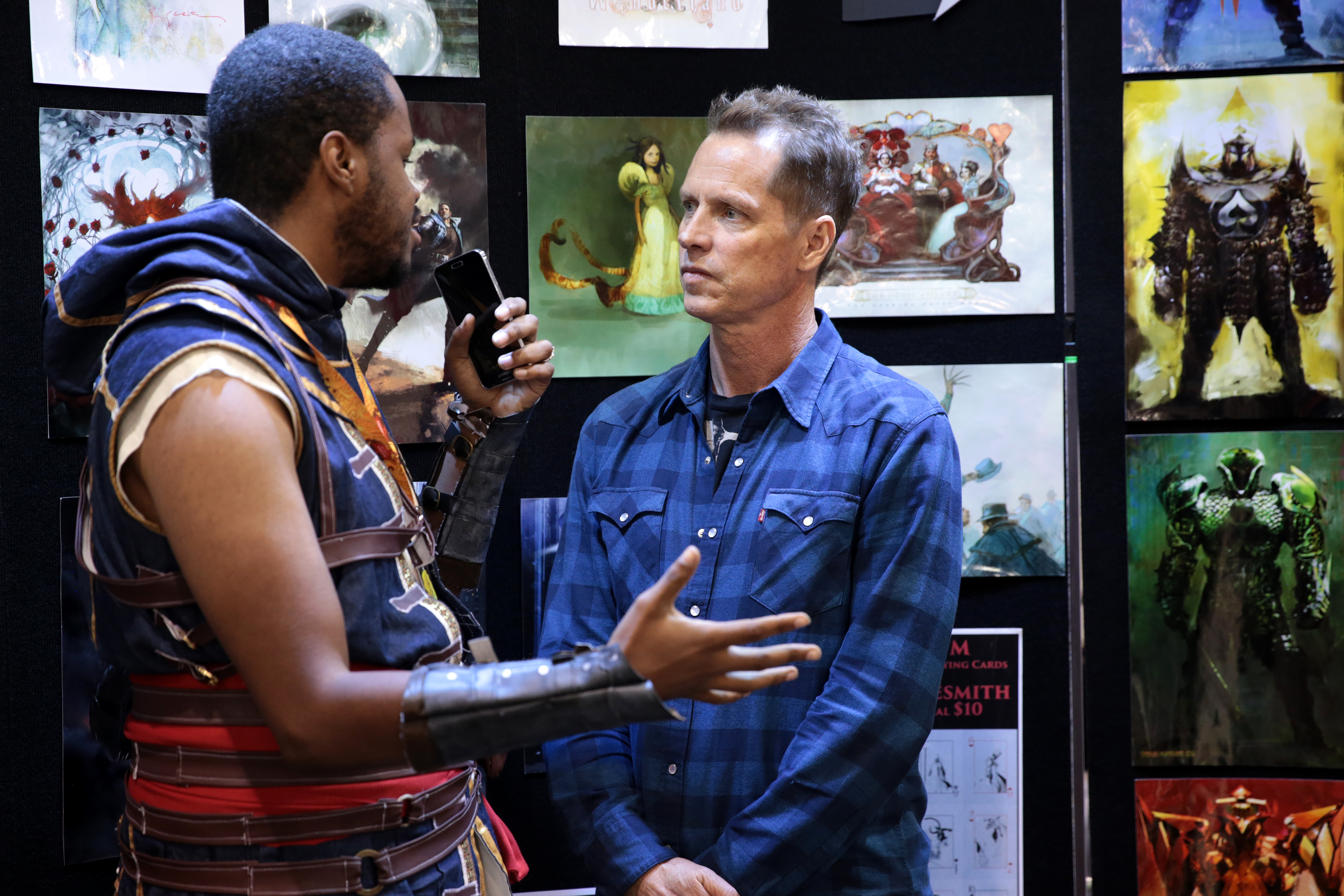
Beddor being interviewed at the 2017 Phoenix Comicon

Beddor grew up in Excelsior, Minnesota.

In 1985, Beddor played John Cusack's skiing stunt double in Better Off Dead.

Beddor also had a career in producing. He worked as a producer on the 1998 film There's Something About Mary starring Cameron Diaz and Ben Stiller.

Beddor then turned to write, writing The Looking Glass Wars.

The Looking Glass Wars made it on The New York Times weekly children's list in 2006. The books are based on a re-imagination of Lewis Carroll's novel Alice in Wonderland. The premise of the novel is that the main character Alice in Alice in Wonderland is real, as is the world of Wonderland, but that Carroll misrepresented the events and made Wonderland seem childlike instead of reflecting the reality of Wonderland.

Beddor has written two more books in The Looking Glass Wars series: Seeing Redd and ArchEnemy. A spin-off comic book of this series called Hatter Madigan was later written by Beddor and Liz Cavalier, with artwork by Ben Templesmith. The spin-off focuses on Hatter Madigan, a character in The Looking Glass Wars.
