= The Lighthouse Trilogy =

The Lighthouse Trilogy is a set of three books by Irish author Adrian McKinty. They are science fiction young adult novels set in New York City, in Ireland and on the fictional planet Altair.

== The Lighthouse Land ==
The Lighthouse Land (Abrams, 2006) is the first installment. 13-year-old Jamie and his mother move to Ireland from Harlem when she inherits Muck Island. When they take up residence in the island's lighthouse, Jamie discovers that he has acquired some otherworldly responsibilities. With his friend Ramsay he travels to another planet, Altair, and helps fight off an invasion.

== The Lighthouse War ==
The Lighthouse War (Abrams, 2007) is the second installment. In this book, Jamie O'Neill and his friend Ramsay have been back in Ireland for a year since their previous adventures on Altair. There is still part of Jamie that wants to be on Altair with the only girl who ever liked him. When a signal from Altair arrives on Earth and Ramsay decodes it, they learn it is a call for help that was sent from a hundred years in the past. The only way to return to Altair is to use the Salmon of Knowledge. Unfortunately the salmon needs to be recharged. In the process of charging it they need to explain what they are doing to Jamie's mom and Ramsay's brother. The four of them are transported to Altair, but into their enemies' stronghold. While Jamie and Ramsay escape, their companions are captured and made hostages. The story revolves around Jamie and Ramsay trying to save their companions and adjusting to how the world has changed since their previous adventures.

== The Lighthouse Keepers ==
The Lighthouse Keepers (Abrams, 2008) is the third installment. It is set in Islandmagee, Ireland and Altair. Hunted by a rogue CIA agent, Jamie O'Neill, Wishaway, Ramsay MacDonald and Thaddeus Harper go to Altair for a final confrontation with the Alkhavans. On their return to Earth Jamie must make an important decision regarding the future of the Earth.
