= Dead I Well May Be =

2003 novel by Adrian McKinty

- First edition
- Author: Adrian McKinty
- Language: English
- Series: Michael Forsythe
- Genre: crime novel
- Publisher: Scribner
- Publication date: 2003
- Publication place: United States
- Media type: Print (Paperback)
- Pages: 320
- ISBN: 9781846686993
- Followed by: The Dead Yard

Dead I Well May be is a 2003 novel by Irish/Australian author Adrian McKinty. It is his second novel, following Orange Rhymes With Everything, and was nominated for the CWA Ian Fleming Steel Dagger award for the best thriller of the year. Booklist chose Dead I May Well Be to be included in its ten best crime novels of the year. The plot is often brutal and dark which McKinty describes vividly.

== Plot summary ==
Michael Forsythe leaves Belfast mid-Troubles after being caught working while claiming unemployment benefits. After arriving illegally in Brooklyn his only option for work is with a small but ambitious Irish gang run by Darkey White. After several jobs for White, Michael and three of his colleagues are sent to Mexico to carry out a drug deal, but one of the four betrays them leaving Michael in a squalid Mexican prison. After weeks of starvation and violent conflict with the other prisoners, Michael manages to escape and begins his journey back to America to seek revenge on his former boss and the colleague who betrayed him.

== Notes ==
- Epigraph:

"And if you come,

when all the flowers are dying

And I am dead,

as dead I well may be..." F. E. Weatherly, "Danny Boy," 1910, adapted from "The Londonderry Air"

== Reviews ==
- Publishers Weekly
- The Guardian
- Kirkus Reviews

== Awards and nominations ==
- 2004 nomination CWA Ian Fleming Steel Dagger
