= After Darkness (novel) =

2014 novel by Christine Piper

- First edition
- Author: Christine Piper
- Language: English
- Genre: novel
- Publisher: Allen & Unwin, Australia
- Publication date: 2014
- Publication place: Australia
- English publication date: 22 April 2014
- Media type: Print (Paperback)
- Pages: 304
- ISBN: 9781743319888

After Darkness (2014) is a novel by Australian author Christine Piper. It won The Australian/Vogel Literary Award in 2014 and was shortlisted for the Miles Franklin Award in 2015.

== Plot summary ==
The novel follows the story, told in three intertwined narrative strands, of Tomakazu Ibaraki, a Japanese doctor living in Australia around the time of World War II. The first strand deals with Ibaraki's arrival in a detainment camp in South Australia in 1942 after the outbreak of war; the second with Ibaraki's arrival in Broome in 1938 to work in a hospital there; and the third concerns his marriage in Tokyo in 1934.

== Reviews ==
- David Messer in Sydney Morning Herald noted the novel "addresses timeless themes such as friendship, personal conscience and others less welcome – racism, nationalism and the way a commitment to bureaucracy can lead to the worst excesses and injustices."
- Linda Funnell in The Newtown Review of Books stated: "This is a thoughtful and beautifully put together novel; it is not easy in parts, but its trajectory is ultimately one of hope, and in its humanity glows like the lanterns launched onto Broome's Roebuck Bay".
- Joanne Peulen of Booklover Book Reviews stated: "There is an understated and refined, almost ageless quality, to Piper’s prose. Any musician understands it is the quieter passages of a concerto that draw in the listener and heighten their emotional engagement with a piece. Piper has translated this knowledge to the pages of After Darkness.

== Awards and nominations ==
- 2014 winner The Australian/Vogel Literary Award
- 2015 shortlisted Indie Awards — Debut Fiction
- 2015 shortlisted Miles Franklin Literary Award
- 2015 shortlisted Nita Kibble Literary Award — Dobbie Award
