= And Thereby Hangs a Tale =

Short story collection by Jeffrey Archer

First edition, published by Macmillan

And Thereby Hangs a Tale (ISBN 9780230531451) is British author Jeffrey Archer's sixth collection of short stories. It was published in 2010, and ten of the fifteen stories are based on tales Archer gathered on travels over the previous six years or so. The other five stories are claimed to derive from his own imagination.

The title comes from Shakespeare's As You Like It. The book had a special launch in Mumbai, India in May 2010. A Bollywood film adaptation of the story Caste-Off has been proposed.

== Reception ==
The Independent said that "the majority of the stories told to him seem to concern cons and money, and the ones he made up flash their outcomes on huge neon signs from the outset", and DNA complained that "His train of thought is almost predictable, and not many of the stories linger in your head after you’re done reading them."

The Calcutta Telegraph, reviewing the book because one of the stories is set in India, concluded that "Highbrows will turn up their noses at this book. Not quite Maupassant or Chekhov they will grumble. The loss is theirs because the stories, like Archer’s previous ones, are a delight", and Daily Times was equally positive, calling it "an ingenious short book, which is both smart and sassy and thoroughly satisfying."

== Contents ==
1. "Stuck On You" *
2. "The Queen's Birthday Telegram" *
3. "High Heels" *
4. "Blind Date"
5. "Where There's a Will" *
6. "Double-Cross" *
7. "'I Will Survive'" *
8. "A Good Eye"
9. "Members Only" *
10. "The Undiplomatic Diplomat" *
11. "The Luck of the Irish" *
12. "Politically Correct"
13. "Better the Devil You Know"
14. "No Room at the Inn"
15. "Caste-Off" *
- * Based on true incidents

== Synopses ==
- Stuck on You tells the story of how a young man is conned by a rich young woman into stealing a diamond ring as an engagement ring and fleeing off to run into another victim of hers after the robbery is successfully carried out.
- The Queen's Birthday Telegram tells the story of an old couple who celebrate their Centenary birthday and how the husband finds out that his wife is older than he is and had celebrated her Centenary before him.
- The Undiplomatic Diplomat allegedly based on truth, is about an eccentric genius with an encyclopedic memory and high-profile ancestry who fails in his diplomatic postings but thrives as the chief archivist to the Foreign and Commonwealth Office. On retirement, and determined to have achieved something memorable in his career, he sets about exploiting an ancient legal technicality which would win an island (possibly Rockall) for the Crown and gain himself recognition worthy of his forefathers.
- Politically Correct has the reader in suspense until the end believing one set of tenants to clearly be terrorists. The protagonist in his investigations is in for a shock and a lesson in prejudice.
- Caste-Off is a story based in the Indian capital New Delhi; how the lead characters Jamwal and Nisha fall in love while waiting for a traffic light to turn green and how Jamwal's parents don't let him marry Nisha because she belongs to a different caste.
