= Seeing Redd =

2007 novel by Frank Beddor

- Author: Frank Beddor
- Language: English
- Genre: Fantasy novel
- Publisher: Dial Press
- Publication date: 2007
- Publication place: United Kingdom
- Media type: Print (Hardback & Paperback); Audiobook
- Pages: 384 pp (hardcover edition), 400 pp (paperback edition)
- ISBN: 0-8037-3155-8
- OCLC: 104641883
- LC Class: PZ7.B3817982 See 2007
- Preceded by: The Looking Glass Wars
- Followed by: ArchEnemy (released October 15, 2009)

Seeing Redd is a 2007 novel written by Frank Beddor inspired by Lewis Carroll's 1865 novel Alice's Adventures in Wonderland and its 1871 sequel Through the Looking-Glass.

Seeing Redd is the second book in the Looking Glass Wars trilogy, which is currently seeing further development in a variety of entertainment-related fields, such as a spin-off comic book limited series (Hatter M). Seeing Redd was released in the United States on August 21, 2007.

== Plot Synopsis ==
The plot centres on Alyss's new responsibilities as Queen, and the fear in the Wonder landers that Redd has returned. Attacks were made on the queendom by Glass Eyes and it is assumed that Redd has returned, when it is actually King Arch trying to gain control of. When Molly is kidnapped, Hatter must disobey his queen and rescue her. Meanwhile, on Earth, Redd and The Cat form an army, lead it into Wonderland, unite King Arch's people against him, and launch an attack against Alyss. While Hatter and Molly go to the mountains to hide. Alyss also must fight her Aunt Redd but loses her powers and Molly learns that Hatter is her father.

== Characters ==
- Alyss Heart: Queen of Hearts and Ruler of Wonderland. She is the most powerful follower of White Imagination, a form of positive magic. Main protagonist and Redd's niece. Tries to balance her love life, war, Redd's return, and ruling her queendom. Alyss is enamored of Dodge Anders.
- Dodge Anders: Captain of the Palace Guards, whose father was killed by The Cat 13 years ago. Dodge has wanted revenge ever since. He is passionately enamored of Alyss, though, because of his father's influence, he thinks this forbidden to him. Tries to control his vengeful side, meeting some success. His father was apparently, loosely based on the White Knight from 'Through the Looking Glass'.
- Hatter Madigan: Milliner and faithful bodyguard to the queen. Has left duty to find out what happened to Weaver, his lover. Father to Homburg Molly. When she is kidnapped, Hatter disobeys Queen Alyss and goes to Boarderland to find her, despite the Queen's orders against this. In the process, he finds Weaver, who he had presumed dead. His main weapons include wrist blades and a top hat which can be flattened into a series of S-shaped, razor-sharp blades held together in the center. The hat is used in a boomerang fashion, and when thrown, it slices through the air in an arc and back to its owner.
- Homburg Molly: Daughter of Hatter Madigan and Weaver, as revealed in the twelfth chapter, and bodyguard to Alyss. Molly's weapon, like her father's, is a hat; in her case, a homburg hat that flattens to become a shield having razor-blade edges. When she feels rejected, she tries to expose a plot by the Lady of Diamonds, but is kidnapped. The device that the Lady of Diamonds gives her destroys Crystal Continuum. Molly later met her mother in Boarderland, where she was taken as bait to trap Hatter. Her mother Weaver died to save her.
- Weaver: Lover of Hatter Madigan and mother to Molly. Was a scientist for the Millinery, the organization to which Hatter belonged. Gives birth to Molly while being chased by Redd. Is "rescued" by King Arch and taken to Borderland. In Chapter 44, she dies saving Molly, much to Hatter and Molly's grief.
- Bibwit Harte: Royal tutor. Adviser to Alyss. Bibwit is an albino and possesses superhuman senses of hearing, as indicated by his long ears. His name is an anagram of 'White Rabbit'. His last name, Harte, also sounds like the royal family's last name, Heart. This is somewhat ironic(and possibly funny) because he is the royal tutor.
- King Arch: Main antagonist and king of Borderland, which is a domain of nomadic tribes and absolute laws. A rather one-dimensional character; of his behaviors, the one most emphasized in dialogue and narration is his persistent misogyny. Uses Glass Eyes and Molly's kidnapping as means of conquering Wonderland, later to blame the former on Redd and the latter on a group of rebels. Conspires with the Diamond family but then betrays them. Creator of WILMA, an acronym for 'Weapon of Inconceivable Loss and Massive Annihilation". He is perhaps based on the King of Hearts since he was a minor character in the first book and also because he and Redd seem to have a special relationship between them
- Ripkins: A Borderlander and assassin/henchman/bodyguard for King Arch. Ripkins possesses the ability to push saw-like teeth through his fingers.
- Blister: A Borderlander and assassin/henchman/bodyguard for King Arch. Blister possesses the ability to cause extremely painful blisters on the skin of anyone he touches. As stated in the book, the blisters he inflicts need to be drained quickly, or else complications will arise.
- Redd/Rose: Absorbed into the Heart Crystal in the first book, Redd re-emerges from a painting in the second book, blurry because of the artist's lack of talent and because the painter's style was too soft. She is met by a tutor similar to Bibwit Harte, named Vollrath, who helps her find Black Imagination practitioners throughout the world to join her and become part of her army. Settles in London, where she gathers her army. To obtain her full strength, she returns to Wonderland to pass through the Looking Glass Maze. After completing the maze, she annexes all of Boarderland's tribes and adds them as part of her army. It is stated early on that her original name was Rose.
- The Diamond Family: Conspire with Arch to take over Wonderland but are betrayed by him. Jack of Diamonds rejoins Redd once she returns from Earth, and helps her conquer Boarderland. After this, Redd sees Jack as worthless and allows Arch to kill him with a deadly pink-capped mushroom.
- General Doppelgänger: Leader of the Wonderland Military. Can split into Generals Doppel and Gänger, which act independently, divide these into more officers at need, or reunite into one. He is based loosely on Tweedledee and Tweedledum.
- Vollrath: A tutor similar to Bibwit. He along with Bibwit graduated from the Tutor Corps. He helps Redd find users of Black Imagination to become members of the army. He is based loosely on the March Hare.
