= Craig Sherborne =

Australian poet, playwright and novelist

- Born: 1962 (age 63–64); Sydney, New South Wales
- Writing career
- Language: English
- Years active: 1989-

Craig Sherborne (born 1962) is an Australian poet, playwright and novelist. He was born in Sydney and attended Scots College there before studying drama in London. He lives in Melbourne.

== Awards ==
- The Ones Out of Town, 1989 winner Wal Cherry Play of the Year Award for Best Unproduced Play
- Hoi Polloi, 2006 shortlisted Victorian Premier's Literary Awards — The Nettie Palmer Prize for Non-Fiction
- Hoi Polloi, 2007 highly commended National Biography Award
- Muck, 2008 shortlisted Victorian Premier's Literary Awards — The Nettie Palmer Prize for Non-Fiction
- Muck, 2008 winner Queensland Premier's Literary Awards — Best Non-Fiction Book
- The Amateur Science of Love, 2011 shortlisted Victorian Premier's Literary Awards — The Vance Palmer Prize for Fiction
- The Amateur Science of Love, 2012 winner Melbourne Prize — Best Writing Award
- The Amateur Science of Love, 2012 shortlisted New South Wales Premier's Literary Awards — UTS Award for New Writing
- Tree Palace, 2015 shortlisted Miles Franklin Literary Award

== Bibliography ==
=== Novels ===
- The Amateur Science of Love (2011)
- Tree Palace (2014)
- Off the Record: A novel (2018)
- The Grass Hotel (2022)

=== Poetry ===
Collections

- Necessary Evil (2006)

Selected list of poems

Title	Year	First published	Reprinted/collected
Hay	1996	Sherborne, Craig (January–February 1996). "Hay". Quadrant. 40 (1–2): 21.	
The lopper	1996	Sherborne, Craig (March 1996). "The lopper". Quadrant. 40 (3 [324]): 61.	
Superstitions of the harvest bell	1996	Sherborne, Craig (March 1996). "Superstitions of the harvest bell". Quadrant. 40 (3 [324]): 61.	

=== Drama ===
- The Ones Out of Town (1989)
- Look at Everything Twice, For Me (1999)
- Off the Record (2004)

=== Autobiography ===
- Hoi Polloi (2005)
- Muck (2007)
