= Joan O'Hagan =

Australian writer

- Born: 1926; Melbourne, Victoria, Australia
- Died: 20 March 2014 (aged 87–88); Sydney, New South Wales, Australia
- Occupation: Crime novelist

Joan O'Hagan (1926 – 20 March 2014) was an Australian crime writer.

== Early life and education ==
O'Hagan was born in Melbourne and was raised in Canberra. She took classes in Classics (Latin and Greek), as well as ancient history, at Victoria University of Wellington, New Zealand.

O'Hagan later moved to New Caledonia. There she helped in translating into English French book John Grant's Journal: A Convict's Story 1803−11 on behalf of the South Pacific Commission, Noumea. She lived in London in the early fifties, and then moved to Rome with her husband, where she worked in the Australian Department of Immigration. Rome remained her home for the next thirty years, during which time she began writing fiction, initially as a mystery writer.

O'Hagan returned to Australia in 1997 when her first grandchild was born. O'Hagan published five books; her first book was Incline and Fall: The Death of Geoffrey Stretton. As she lay dying, her grandson, Dominic West, a student at Marist College, painted a portrait of her that won the $1,000 the Brian Jordan Award at the annual Religious Art competition.

O'Hagan finished her final book, Jerome & His Women, just days before her death, writing its preface on her death bed. The book, a work of historical fiction set in Rome during the fourth century, was praised by Mario Baghos, of Sydney’s St Andrew's Greek Orthodox Theological College, as "meticulously researched and well informed."

== Books ==
- Incline and Fall: The Death of Geoffrey Stretton (Angus & Robertson 1976)
- Death and a Madonna (Macmillan 1986)
- Against the Grain (Macmillan 1987)
- A Roman Death (Macmillan 1988, first edition)
- A Roman Death (Black Quill Press 2017, second edition)
- Jerome & His Women (Black Quill Press 2015)
