= In the Morning I'll Be Gone =

Book by Adrian McKinty

In the Morning I'll be Gone
- First edition
- Author: Adrian McKinty
- Language: English
- Series: Sean Duffy
- Genre: crime novel
- Publisher: Allen & Unwin, Australia
- Publication date: 2014
- Publication place: Australia
- Media type: Print (Paperback)
- Pages: 256
- ISBN: 9781846688201
- Preceded by: I Hear the Sirens in the Street
- Followed by: Gun Street Girl

In the Morning I'll be Gone is a 2014 novel by Belfast born novelist Adrian McKinty which won the 2014 Ned Kelly Award for Best Novel. It is the third in the author's Sean Duffy series, following The Cold Cold Ground and I Hear the Sirens in the Street.

== Plot summary ==
In Belfast, September 1983, in the middle of The Troubles, Sergeant Sean Duffy, one of the few Catholics in the Royal Ulster Constabulary (RUC), is drummed out of the RUC on trumped up charges. At the same time, Dermot McCann, an IRA master bomber and ex-schoolmate of Duffy's escapes from the Maze prison and becomes a prime target for British Intelligence. MI5 drags Duffy out of his drunken retirement to track down McCann. The novel follows Duffy's attempts to solve a locked-room murder in order to obtain inside information on McCann's whereabouts, which finally leads to the assassination attempt on British Prime Minister Margaret Thatcher in Brighton.

== Notes ==
- Epitaph: "My friend you must understand that time forks perpetually into countless futures. And in at least one of them I have become your enemy." Jorge Luis Borges, The Garden of Forking Paths (1941)

== Reviews ==
- The Boston Globe
- Kirkus Reviews
- Publishers Weekly
- Booklover Book Reviews

== Awards and nominations ==
- 2014 winner Ned Kelly Awards for Crime Writing — Best Novel
