= Eucharis (fiction) =

Attendant of Calypso in Fenelon's Aventures de Télémaque

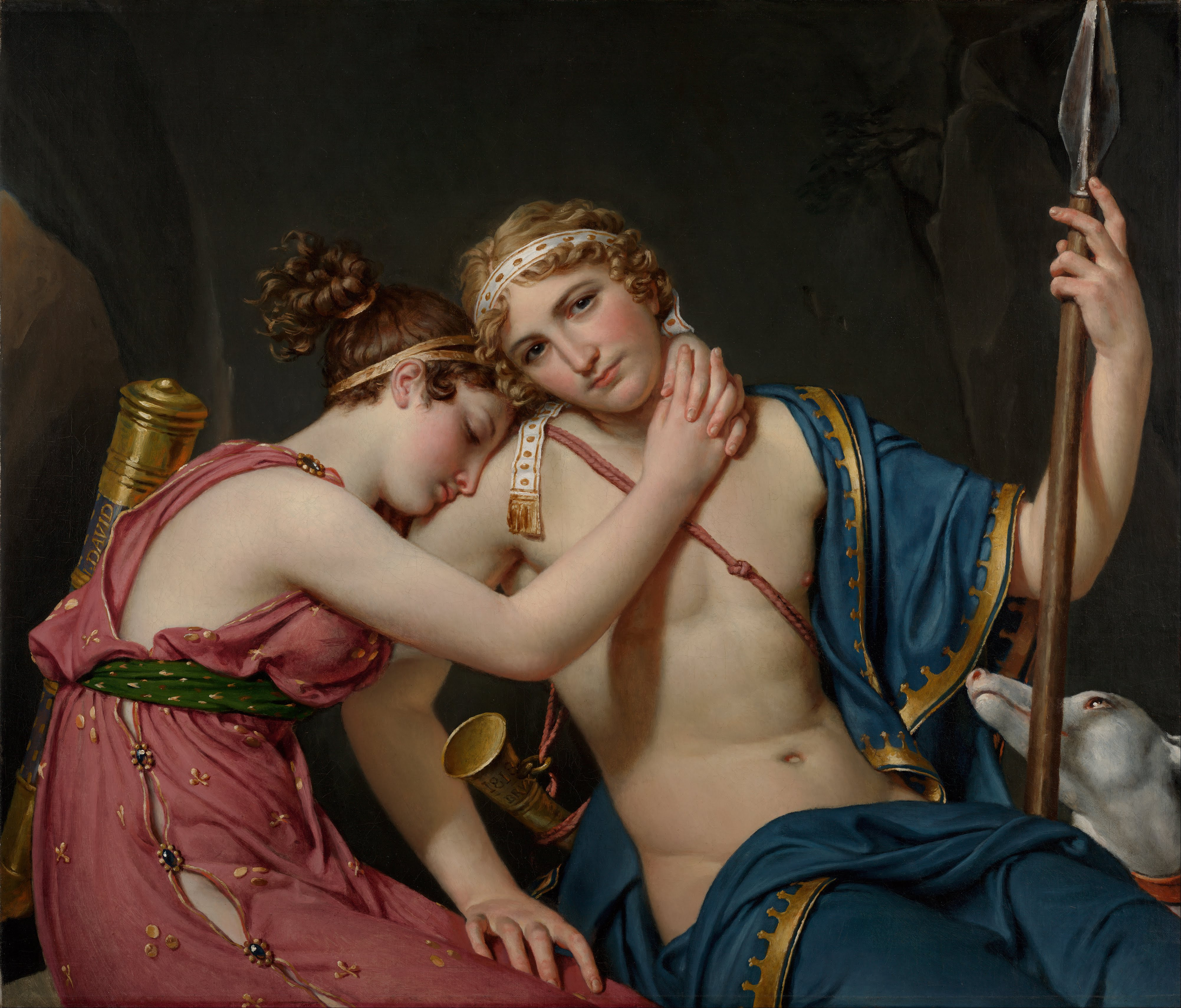
The Farewell of Telemachus and Eucharis by Jacques-Louis David

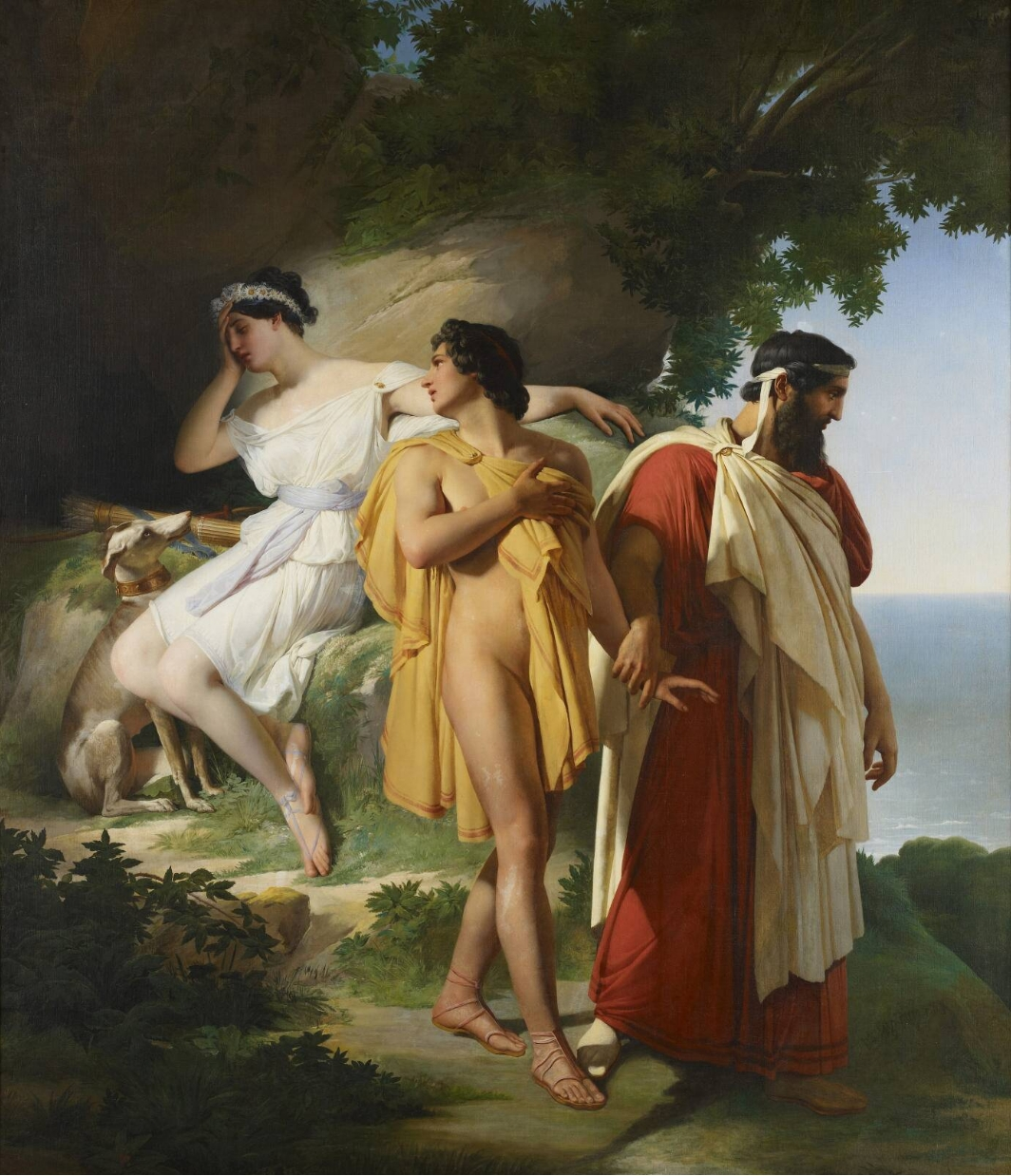
The Farewell of Telemachus and Eucharis by Raymond Auguste Quinsac Monvoisin

Eucharis, who does not appear in Greek mythology, was one of the nymph Calypso's attendants in Fénelon's novel Les Aventures de Télémaque (1699), a modern prose epic which incorporates Homeric themes. In the novel, Telemachus is shipwrecked on Calypso's island Ogygia while searching for his father Odysseus, and there falls in love with Eucharis before leaving her to continue the search for his father.

Fénelon, in charge of the education of the prospective heir to the French throne, admonished his readers to see the work "not as a frivolous novel, that is offered here, reader, for your idleness, but a learned parable". Its theme of the conflict between duty and love is a persistent one, central in French 17th-century classical theater, but peripheral to the Odyssey in spite of its erotic episodes. A sub-theme in Les Aventures de Télémaque, that of spiritual education, is summed up within the novel by Mentor, who says, "He who has not felt his weakness and the violence of his passions is not yet wise; for he does not yet understand himself and does not know how to distrust himself." (In the tradition of the Odyssey, Mentor was a friend of Odysseus; Odysseus placed Mentor in charge of his son Telemachus when he himself left for the Trojan War.)

The story is perhaps best known from Jacques-Louis David's painting The Farewell of Telemachus and Eucharis, painted during David's exile in Brussels (1818), and now at the J. Paul Getty Museum. She is also depicted in Frederick Leighton's Eucharis – A Girl with a Basket of Fruit (c. 1863). She also appears, somewhat elliptically, in Arthur Rimbaud's Après le déluge:

Puis, dans la futaie violette, bourgeonnante, Eucharis me dit que c'était le printemps.
"Then, in the violet wood, budding, Eucharis said to me it was Spring."

== Etymology ==
Eucharis (Εὔχαρις) is from the Greek compound εὖ prefixed to χάρις (meaning grace or charm, the prefix "eu-" denoting good or beautiful). There may also be a connotation of granting sexual favors (from the verb χαρίζειν - charizein).
