= Blood & Guts (book) =

2014 non-fiction book about modern whaling

Blood & Guts: dispatches from the whale wars
- Author: Sam Vincent
- Language: English
- Publisher: Black Inc
- Publication date: 2014
- Publication place: Australia
- Pages: 274
- ISBN: 9-781863-956826

Blood & Guts is a 2014 non-fiction book by Australian writer Sam Vincent. It deals with the conflicts over modern whaling, mainly dealing with Japanese whaling and the campaign run by Sea Shepherd Conservation Society against it.

== Critical reception ==
Andrew Darby, writing in The Sydney Morning Herald in 2014, outlined the controversy about whaling in southern oceans at that time and noted that it is "probably just as well that today we have as a guide through this Alice in Wonderland world someone such as Sam Vincent, armed in his quest for a sensible answer with a self-described 'lump of coal heart'. Blood and Guts: Dispatches from the Whale Wars is no whale-hugger's diary. It's a prolonged growl of frustration."
