= 1999 in Australian literature =

This article presents a list of the historical events and publications of Australian literature during 1999.

== Events ==
- Murray Bail won the Miles Franklin Award for Eucalyptus
- Jan Fullerton was appointed Director General of the National Library of Australia, being the first woman and first internal appointee

== Major publications ==
=== Novels ===
- Thea Astley — Drylands
- Lily Brett — Too Many Men
- Marshall Browne – The Burnt City
- Kate Grenville — The Idea of Perfection
- Dorothy Hewett — Neap Tide
- Julia Leigh — The Hunter
- Michael Meehan — The Salt of Broken Tears
- Bruce Pascoe — Shark
- Dorothy Porter — What a Piece of Work
- Matthew Reilly — Ice Station
- Heather Rose — White Heart
- Kim Scott — Benang
- Amy Witting — Isobel on the Way to the Corner Shop

=== Science fiction and fantasy ===
- James Bradley — The Deep Field
- Trudi Canavan – "Whispers of the Mist Children"
- Sara Douglass — Crusader
- Kate Forsyth – The Cursed Towers
- Greg Egan
  - "Border Guards"
  - Teranesia
- Ian Irvine — Dark is the Moon
- Juliet Marillier – Daughter of the Forest
- Sean McMullen – Souls in the Great Machine
- George Turner – Down There in Darkness

=== Crime ===
- Marshall Browne — The Wooden Leg of Inspector Anders
- Garry Disher — The Dragon Man
- Kerry Greenwood – Death Before Wicket
- Gabrielle Lord – Feeding the Demons
- Barry Maitland – The Chalon Heads
- Tara Moss – Fetish
- Chris Nyst — Cop This!
- Peter Temple
  - Black Tide
  - Shooting Star

=== Children's and young adult fiction ===
- Helen Barnes — Killing Aurora
- Graeme Base — The Worst Band in the Universe
- Damien Broderick, with Rory Barnes — Stuck in Fast Forward
- Kim Caraher — Goanna Anna
- Nick Earls — 48 Shades of Brown
- Christine Harris — Foreign Devil
- Sonya Hartnett — Stripes of the Sidestep Wolf
- Victor Kelleher — The Ivory Trail
- Dave Luckett — A Dark Victory
- Markus Zusak — The Underdog

=== Poetry ===
- Kevin Hart — Wicked Heat
- John Kinsella — Visitants
- Jennifer Maiden — Mines
- Les Murray — Conscious and Verbal

=== Drama ===
- Van Badham — The Wilderness of Mirrors

=== Non-fiction ===
- Ian McFarlane — Encyclopedia of Australian Rock and Pop
- Drusilla Modjeska — Stravinsky's Lunch
- Les Murray — The Quality of Sprawl: Thoughts about Australia
- Anne Summers — Ducks on the Pond: An Autobiography 1945–1976
- David Walker— Anxious Nation: Australia and the Rise of Asia 1850–1939

== Awards and honours ==
- Michael Fitzgerald Page AM "for service to the book publishing industry and to literature as a writer, and through the encouragement and support of upcoming Australian authors"
- Frank John Ford AM "for service to the development of the performing arts in South Australia as a director, playwright, administrator and educator"
- Kay Saunders AM "for service to Australian history as a scholar, author and commentator on social issues"
- John Antill Millett OAM "for service to literature as editor of Poetry Australia"

=== Lifetime achievement ===
Award	Author
Christopher Brennan Award	Kevin Hart
Patrick White Award	Gerald Murnane

=== Literary ===
Award	Author	Title	Publisher
The Age Book of the Year Award	K. S. Inglis	Sacred Places: War Memorials in the Australian Landscape	Miegunyah Press
ALS Gold Medal	Murray Bail	Eucalyptus	Random House
Colin Roderick Award	Christopher Koch	Out of Ireland	Doubleday
Nita Kibble Literary Award	Geraldine Brooks	Foreign Correspondence: A Pen Pal's Journey From Down; Under to All Over	Anchor Books

=== Fiction ===
==== International ====
Award	Category	Author	Title	Publisher
Commonwealth Writers' Prize	Best Novel, SE Asia and South Pacific region	Murray Bail	Eucalyptus	Harvill Press
Commonwealth Writers' Prize	Best Overall Novel	Murray Bail	Eucalyptus	Harvill Press

==== National ====
Award	Author	Title	Publisher
Adelaide Festival Awards for Literature	Not awarded		
The Age Book of the Year Award	James Bradley	The Deep Field	Sceptre
The Australian/Vogel Literary Award	Hsu-Ming Teo	Love and Vertigo	Allen and Unwin
Miles Franklin Award	Murray Bail	Eucalyptus	Random House
New South Wales Premier's Literary Awards	Roger McDonald	Mr Darwin's Shooter	Random House
Queensland Premier's Literary Awards	Les Murray	Fredy Neptune: A Novel in Verse	Duffy & Snellgrove
Victorian Premier's Literary Awards	Roger McDonald	Mr Darwin's Shooter	Random House
Western Australian Premier's Book Awards	Kim Scott	Benang : From the Heart	Fremantle Arts Centre Press

=== Crime and Mystery ===
==== National ====
Award	Category	Author	Title	Publisher
Ned Kelly Award
Ned Kelly Award	Novel	Peter Doyle	Amaze Your Friends	Random House
Ned Kelly Award	First novel	Andrew Masterson	The Last Days	Picador
Ned Kelly Award	Lifetime Achievement	Peter Corris		

=== Children and Young Adult ===
Award	Category	Author	Title	Publisher
Children's Book of the Year Award	Older Readers	Phillip Gwynne	Deadly, Unna?	Penguin Books
Children's Book of the Year Award	Picture Book	John Marsden & Shaun Tan	The Rabbits	Lothian
New South Wales Premier's Literary Awards	Children's Literature	Odo Hirsch	Antonio S and the Mystery of Theodore Guzman	Allen & Unwin
New South Wales Premier's Literary Awards	Young People's Literature	Garry Disher	The Divine Wind	Hodder Headline Australia
Victorian Premier's Prize for Young Adult Fiction		Phillip Gwynne	Deadly, Unna?	Penguin

=== Poetry ===
Award	Author	Title	Publisher
Adelaide Festival Awards for Literature	Not awarded		
The Age Book of the Year	R. A. Simpson	The Impossible, and Other Poems	Five Islands Press
Anne Elder Award	Not awarded		
Grace Leven Prize for Poetry	Not awarded		
Mary Gilmore Award	Not awarded		
New South Wales Premier's Literary Awards	Lee Cataldi	Race Against Time	Penguin Books Australia
Victorian Premier's Literary Awards	Gig Ryan	Pure and Applied	Paper Bark Press
Western Australian Premier's Book Awards	Tracy Ryan	The Willing Eye	Fremantle Arts Centre Press

=== Drama ===
Award	Category	Author	Title
New South Wales Premier's Literary Awards	FilmScript	Heather Rose, Frederick Stahl and Rolf de Heer	Dance Me to My Song
New South Wales Premier's Literary Awards	Play	Scott Rankin and Leah Purcell	Box the Pony
Victorian Premier's Literary Awards	Drama	Catherine Zimdahl	Clark in Sarajevo

=== Non-fiction ===
Award	Category	Author	Title	Publisher
Adelaide Festival Awards for Literature	Non-Fiction	Not awarded		
The Age Book of the Year	Non-Fiction	K. S. Inglis	Sacred Places: War Memorials in the Australian Landscape	Anchor
National Biography Award	Biography	Not awarded		
New South Wales Premier's Literary Awards	Non-Fiction	Ray Parkin	H M Bark Endeavour	Melbourne University Press
Victorian Premier's Literary Awards	Non-Fiction	Peter Robb	M: The Man Who Became Caravaggio	Duffy and Snellgrove

== Deaths ==
A list, ordered by date of death (and, if the date is either unspecified or repeated, ordered alphabetically by surname) of deaths in 1999 of Australian literary figures, authors of written works or literature-related individuals follows, including year of birth.

- 15 February — Gordon Neil Stewart, writer (born 1912)
- 1 March — Richard Beynon, playwright, actor and television producer (born 1925)
- 20 April — Ric Throssell, diplomat and author whose writings included novels, plays, film and television scripts and memoirs (born 1922)
- 8 July — Mavis Thorpe Clark, novelist and writer for children (born 1909)
- 12 July — Mungo Ballardie MacCallum, journalist, broadcaster and poet (born 1913)
- 9 October — Morris West, novelist and playwright (born 1916)
- 16 November — Mal Morgan, poet (born 1936, London, England)

== See also ==
- 1999 in Australia
- 1999 in literature
- 1999 in poetry
- List of years in literature
- List of years in Australian literature
