= Australian Studies Centre =

Australian Studies Centre may refer to:

- Australian Studies Centre (London), then in the Institute of Commonwealth Studies, University of London; now Menzies Australia Institute, in King's College London
- Australian Studies Centre (Renmin University of China), Beijing
