= Happy Together =

Happy Together may refer to:

== Music ==
- "Happy Together" (song), a 1967 song by the Turtles that has been covered several times
  - Happy Together (The Turtles album) (1967)
  - Happy Together concert tours in 1985 and from 2010 featuring The Turtles, Gary Lewis, The Buckinghams, and others
- Happy Together (Twins album) (2002)
- Happy Together (Leningrad Cowboys album) (1994)
- Happy Together (The Nylons album) (1987)
- Happy Together, a 2017 album by Mega Bog
- "Happy Together", a 2009 song by Super Junior from Sorry, Sorry

== Film ==
- Happy Together (1989 American film), starring Helen Slater and Patrick Dempsey
- Happy Together (1989 Hong Kong film), by Stephen Shin
- Happy Together (1997 film), a Hong Kong film by Wong Kar-wai
- Happy Together (2008 film), by Geoffrey Enthoven
- Happy Together (2018 film), a South Korean film by Kim Jung-hwan

== Television ==
- Happy Together (South Korean TV series), a 1999 South Korean drama by SBS
- Happy Together (talk show), a 2001 South Korean talk show by KBS
- Happy Together (Russian TV series), a 2006 Russian remake of Married... with Children
- Happy Together (American TV series), a 2018 American comedy series
- Happy Together (Philippine TV series), a 2021 comedy series in the Philippines by GMA Network
- Inday Will Always Love You, a 2018 drama series in the Philippines known internationally as Happy Together

== Literature ==
- Happy Together: Bridging the Australia China Divide, a 2022 autobiography by David Walker and Li Yao
- "Happy Together", a storyline in the science fiction comedy webtoon series Live with Yourself!

== See also ==
- So Happy Together (disambiguation)
