= Karobran =

1978 novel

Karobran: The Story of an Aboriginal Girl is an autobiographical novel by Monica Clare, published posthumously in 1978. It was among the first publications by an Aboriginal Australian woman, though it was significantly altered after her death, and in some cases, alterations changed the meaning of passages. It has been identified as a work supporting the Communist Party of Australia and minimizing some elements of Clare's own life. The novel was obscure until critical interest was revived in the 1990s.

== Publication and contents ==
According to Fred Moore, a friend of Monica Clare, until the early 1970s, many Aboriginal Australian writers were not sought after by publishers – "there was no funding" for publishing Aboriginal writing, and "no one took Aboriginal people very serious". Monica Clare, herself an Aboriginal woman, wrote the autobiographical novel Karobran prior to her death in 1973, and Society of Women Writers member Mona Brand edited it. Upon Clare's death, Brand ceased working on the novel because the society considered it distasteful to edit the work of dead writers. Jack Horner, a friend of Clare's, began editing it thereafter for $350. The book was published by Alternative Publishing Co-operative Limited – a newly-formed press for books the major presses did not wish to publish ― in 1978. Faith Bandler wrote the preface. Along with Margaret Tucker's If Everyone Cared (1977), it was one of the first published works by an Aboriginal woman. (Note: Adam Shoemaker, a scholar of indigenous Australian literature, argues in Shoemaker (1982, p. 119) that although Faith Bandler published Wacvie in 1977, Bandler was of New Hebridean (specifically Ambrymese) descent, and hence not Aboriginal Australian. For Shoemaker, this left Karobran as among the first publications by an Aboriginal writer, though its significant revisions after Clare's death may also disqualify it as genuine Aboriginal literature. It is identified as being perhaps the first published work by an Aboriginal woman in Michell (2017, p. 98).)

Horner significantly edited the text; out of some 6,000 alterations that Horner made, at least half of them changed the meaning of portions of the draft. For example, several references to Aboriginal culture and spiritual life were removed. In the final, published version of the novel, Isabelle, an Aboriginal girl, is taken from her father, raised as a domestic servant by a white family, experiences racial discrimination by her schoolmates, and becomes radicalized by the labour movement.

== Reception ==
Between 1978 and 1988, only two universities had Karobran as a course material, and over the next ten years, only some fifty copies of the novel were sold. The book was obscure until the 1990s, and critics treated the text as edited haphazardly and for a political agenda. For instance, literary critic Gay Raines identified the novel as being "mediated through 'white' introductions", since the novel had a "publishers note, acknowledgments, a foreword, a preface, and an introduction" at once, even though it could stand on its own.

Literary critic Kay Schaffer writes that the novel was written to support the Communist Party of Australia, and that the final scene – an optimistic rally by a group of protesters for expanding rights – "invokes a socialist-realist platform for political action". Schaffer writes that Clare's decision to highlight this theme, but failing to mention her own divorce or child separation, has been noticed by others reading the text – particularly Aboriginal readers.

== Notes and references ==
=== Bibliography ===
- Gunson, Niel (1981). "Proud shoes: Black family history in Australia". Aboriginal History. 5 (2): 147–152.
- Jones, Jennifer (2000). "Yesterday's words: The editing of Monica Clare's Karobran". Journal of Australian Studies. 24 (64): 128–134. doi:10.1080/14443050009387564.
- Jones, Jennifer (2013). "Australian Aboriginal life writers and their editors: Cross-cultural collaboration, authorial intention, and the impact of editorial choices". In Wheeler, Belinda (ed.). A companion to Australian Aboriginal literature. Camden House. ISBN 9781571135216.
- Michell, Dee (2017). "From hagiography to personal pain: Stories of Australian foster care in the nineteenth century to the twenty-first". Adoption & Culture. 5: 89–109. doi:10.1353/ado.2017.0004.
- Raines, Gay (December 1991). "Aboriginal writing as a reassertion of cultural identity". Antipodes. 5 (2): 101–106.
- Schaffer, Kay (June 2002). "Stolen generation narratives in local and global contexts". Antipodes. 16 (1): 5–10.
- Shoemaker, Adam (1982). "Aboriginal creative writing: A survey to 1981". Aboriginal History. 7 (1/2): 111–129.
- Walden, Inara (November 1995). "'That was slavery days': Aboriginal domestic servants in New South Wales in the twentieth century". Labour History (69): 196–209.
