= Stranded Nation =

2019 non-fiction book by David Walker

Stranded Nation: White Australia in an Asian Region
- Author: David Walker
- Language: English
- Subject: Australian History
- Genre: Non-fiction
- Publisher: UWAP
- Publication date: 2019
- Publication place: Australia
- Media type: Print - paperback
- ISBN: 9781760800277
- Preceded by: Anxious Nation

Stranded Nation: White Australia in an Asian Region is a nonfiction book written by David Walker, a scholar of Australian images of Asia. It was published by the UWAP in 2019 and is a sequel to Anxious Nation. It explores the evolution of Australia's engagement with Asia during World War II and in the post-war period to the 1980s.

== Summary ==
Walker argues that Australia's place in Asia has been at the forefront of public discussion and controversy since the mid 19th century. Australians imagined themselves as being a ‘white’ nation surrounded by hordes of 'Asiatics' whose magnitude, proximity and foreignness threatened the existence of Australia's European society. Australians believed that the support of other 'white' nations, particularly the United Kingdom and the United States, was required to maintain their security in a hostile environment. As Britain withdrew into a closer relationship with Europe during and after World War II, Australians were forced to recognise an urgent need to come to an accommodation with Asia. This resulted in persistent calls for a better understanding of the "Asian psyche" and changes in the rhetoric and rationale supporting the White Australia Policy. Through a range of government policies and schemes Australia sought to position itself as an Asia-friendly neighbour and not an arrogant white intruder. These schemes were frequently cosmetic in nature and had limited effect while the White Australia Policy remained effective until the mid 1970s.

Walker's argument draws on a wide range of sources including archival records and the personal stories of visitors to and from Asia including writers, merchants, students and diplomats. Popular fiction is also examined including the stories of W E Johns' Biggles. These sources illustrate the complexity of Australia's response to a changing world in which concepts of race and white prestige were shaken and transformed by decolonisation.

== Critical response ==
Stephen FitzGerald has described Stranded Nation as "a recommended read for anyone, politicians and students alike, seeking to know the history of Australia’s agonising over Asia; how it began, how it evolved and the passionate and colourful characters involved. Stranded Nation is told with authority, insight and wit, and the satisfying readability of a goodnovel, and that makes it great history."

On April 24, 2019 the book was discussed by Professor Walker and Richard Fidler on the ABC radio program Conversations.
