= The Deep Field (novel) =

1999 novel by Australian writer James Bradley

- Author: James Bradley
- Language: English
- Genre: Fiction
- Publisher: Sceptre
- Publication date: 1999
- Publication place: Australia
- Media type: Print
- Pages: 414 pp.
- Awards: The Age Book of the Year Award - Fiction winner 1999
- ISBN: 0733611400
- Preceded by: Wrack
- Followed by: The Resurrectionist

The Deep Field (1999) is a novel by Australian writer James Bradley. It was originally published by Sceptre in Australia in 1999.

== Synopsis ==
In the twenty-first century India and Pakistan have fought a brief nuclear war, Tokyo has been devastated by a major earthquake and Hong Kong is experiencing major civil unrest as a result. Photographer Anna Frasier has returned to Sydney from Hong Kong where she meets palaeontologist Seth and his sister Rachel. The novel follows the growing relationship between Anna and Seth against a backdrop of Sydney experiencing severe and extended heatwave weather.

== Publishing history ==
After its initial publication in Australia by Sceptre in 1999, the novel was reprinted as follows:

- Sceptre, Australia, 2000
- Headline Review, UK, 2000
- Henry Holt, USA, 2000

The novel was also translated into Polish and German in 2002.

== Critical reception ==
In the Australian Book Review Andrew Reimer noted: "Bradley has the true novelist’s ability to get inside his characters and to observe how their attitudes and responses change and develop. He knows, too, that holding back is frequently more effective than full disclosure...Bradley is working, I think, with his head and his intelligence, both considerable yet both a good deal less impressive than his novelist’s instincts. When those instincts lead him to engage with his characters and their world (no matter how strange some of it may seem to us), The Deep Field reaches imaginative heights not often encountered in novels these days."

A reviewer for Publishers Weekly was also impressed: "Bradley's supple prose is sonorously paced but, at times, his Proustian meditations on memory and love verge on the platitudinous, and metaphors and literary epigraphs pile up. Still, Bradley creates a convincing futuristic vocabulary and makes deft use of the language of fossil research and photography, proving himself a talented novelist with staying power."

== Awards ==
- The Age Book of the Year Award - Fiction winner 1999

== See also ==
- 1999 in Australian literature
