= Not Dark Yet: A Personal History =

Not Dark Yet: A personal history
- Author: David Walker
- Language: English
- Subject: Australian History
- Genre: Non-fiction
- Publisher: Giramondo Publishing
- Publication date: 2011
- Publication place: Australia
- Media type: Print - paperback
- Pages: 312
- ISBN: 978-1-920882-65-5
- OCLC: 782046201

Not Dark Yet: A personal history is a 2011 book by Australian cultural historian David Walker, who suffered a sudden and severe loss of sight due to macular degeneration which limited his ability to continue archival research and forced him to "find another, more personal voice and another way of writing". The book documents his own and his family's relationship to the past. This was a significant departure from Walker's academic work in which he is a pre-eminent authority on Australia's engagement with Asia. However, through this book, Walker found that the personal has a role in the writing of history; "small events also have their place in determining who we are and what we value as individuals and as a community".

== Summary ==
Not Dark Yet traces the story of Walker's family over five generations; from the settlement of his great-great grandparents in South Australia in the 1850s until the death of his mother in the 1990s. Many of the early chapters are set in Burra, a copper mining town 156 km (97 miles) north of Adelaide, where his family were well-known shopkeepers. Of particular significance is the story of Luke Day, a relative through marriage and a Chinese merchant in Burra. Here the personal narrative intersects with the author's academic interests and Walker uses Day's life to re-examine the position held by the Chinese in Australian society during a period when Australian racial nationalism and the resultant White Australia Policy were strident. Walker captures the essence of life in a small Australian town at the beginning of the twentieth century with all its strengths, limitations and petty jealousies.

In later sections of the book Walker intimately describes the lives of his parents and his own journey into academia. Australia's engagement with Asia is again given prominence through the description of the devastating effects that the Second World War had on the author's family. When he was a child, Walker was unaware of the fate of uncle Laurie and mention of his name lead to uncomfortable silences. This led Walker to use his historian's skills to investigate Laurie's life. He discovered that his uncle had volunteered for service with the 13th squadron of the RAAF and had been posted to Ambon. He had attempted to escape from the island when it was overrun by the advancing Japanese but through a series of fateful mishaps was captured and executed in the Laha Massacre of Australian prisoners of war. The brutality and apparent pointlessness of Laurie's death resonated in the Walker family over the next two generations. The book also explores the lives of two other uncles whose lives were affected by the war. One served in 467 squadron of the RAAF with Bomber Command and another with the 2/43rd Battalion in North Africa, New Guinea and Borneo. A further poignant episode is Walker's gentle description of his mother's decline into dementia and subsequent death.

Despite these tragedies the book's premise is one of joy and optimism. This is achieved through the author's wit and good-natured humour in the face of misfortune. A single example in the first chapter sets the tone of the book. When his ophthalmologist told him that he was now "legally blind", his immediate response was to ask if it was possible for him to be "illegally blind" instead.

== Critical response ==
Not Dark Yet received an extensive and positive critical response. Kerryn Goldsworthy in the Sydney Morning Herald wrote that Not Dark Yet was an "intriguing and engaging book... made even more readable by Walker's personality, which comes across as modest, funny and wry as he tells (his) stories. He's stoic but realistic about his precarious physical state and mildly self-reproaching for having, as a professional historian, undervalued the idea of family history for so long...the book exerts the same powerful grip on the reader as the family chronicles and sagas of good 19th-century fiction and has the same kind of deep, complicated, personal appeal." Professor Tom Griffiths of the Australian National University described the book as “a charismatic and enigmatic work... curious, wry, poignant and sweet”. It combined elements of, "a memoir, a family history, a cultural history of modern Australia, a study of memory, legend and storytelling, an investigation of national character, a local and regional study, a reflection on history and the historian’s craft, an auto-ethnography".

Jennifer Levasseur in The Australian found Walker to be "a delightful, witty guide who balances thorough research with banter. While his memoir moves through some of the darkest moments of contemporary and personal history, including World War II atrocities and mental breakdowns, he maintains a fluid, easy style that combines empathy with cheekiness". Andrew Moore writing in Labour History discovered interconnections between Walker's family history and his long term academic interests. The stories told in Not Dark Yet emphasised elements of Australian cultural development and the history of Australia's engagement with Asia. Phillip Adams described the book as “an evocative portrait of 20th century Australia …the attitudes, idiosyncrasies and prejudices of the era.”
