= Monica Clare =

Aboriginal political activist and author (1924–1973)

Mona Matilda Clare (13 August 1924 – 13 July 1973) better known as Monica Clare was an Aboriginal Australian political activist and author. She was the first Indigenous woman to publish a novel, though Karobran was published after her death.

== Early life ==
Clare was born on 13 August 1924 at Dareel near Goondiwindi in Queensland. She was the daughter of Aboriginal shearer Daniel Herbert McGowan and an English woman, Beatrice Scott. She had one brother Dan. After the death of their mother, the children were sent to Yasmar home for infants at Haberfield and later fostered to siblings Bill and Stella Woodbury at their farm near Spencer on the Hawkesbury River. In 1935 officials separated Monica and Dan, who never saw each other again. Monica was then schooled at Strathfield, and was trained in domestic work. After many years working for Sydney suburban families, Clare was released from being a ward of the state in August 1942. She then worked in factories such as W. D. & H. O. Wills (Australia) Ltd's cigarette factory.

== Career and activism ==
Clare became involved in race relations and Labor politics, after meeting the Aboriginal community at Bellwood reserve in north coast of New South Wales. She worked with Aboriginal families at La Perouse, enrolling them to vote, while working on Daniel Curtin's campaign for the Federal seat of Watson.

Clare married in 1953 and had a daughter, but later divorced. She then married union official Leslie Forsyth Clare on 13 August 1962. Clare joined the women's committees of the union in Wollongong, accompanying Leslie on his travels inspecting the conditions on Aboriginal reserves. Clare then became secretary of the Aboriginal committee of the South Coast Labor Council, lobbying to see improved housing and financial support for Aboriginal people.

Clare died on 13 July 1973 in Sydney.

== Karobran ==
Clare wrote an autobiographical novel Karobran. Having attended a creative-writing course at Wollongong, she rewrote the manuscript many times until she was satisfied. It was published posthumously in April 1978.
