= The Second Coming (Masterson novel) =

Book by Andrew Masterson

The Second Coming: The Passion of Joe Panther
- First edition
- Author: Andrew Masterson
- Language: English
- Genre: Novel
- Publisher: Flamingo, Australia
- Publication date: 2000
- Publication place: Australia
- Media type: Print Paperback
- Pages: 358 pp
- ISBN: 0-7322-6804-4
- OCLC: 45602827
- Preceded by: The Letter Girl
- Followed by: Death of the Author

The Second Coming: the Passion of Joe Panther is a Ned Kelly Award-winning novel by the Australian author Andrew Masterson, published in 2000. It is a sequel to the author's first novel The Last Days : The Apocryphon of Joe Panther Andrew published in 1998.

== Abstract ==
"There is no god," I told him. Then I drove the syringe up into his nostril and straight through the side of his nose. Joe Panther is a psychotic, alcoholic, violent, substance-abusing heroin dealer. He is also, he believes, Joshua Ben Pantera, born two thousand years ago, the son of Mary and the Lord God Yaweh Himself, not dead yet, the crucified Jesus: still around, abandoned by his Father, abused by the world, and as pissed off as hell.

== Awards ==
- Ned Kelly Awards for Crime Writing, Best Novel Award, 2001: joint winner

== Reviews ==
The reviewer in "Barcelona Review" noted: "Masterson has delivered a beaut. The crime story-line in The Second Coming is much better [than the first novel], in fact - more in control, with the final clue to the identity of one of the killers coming down to the sort of quirky detail Colombo would spot."
