= David Walker (historian) =

Australian academic historian (born 1945)

David Walker AM FASSA FAHA
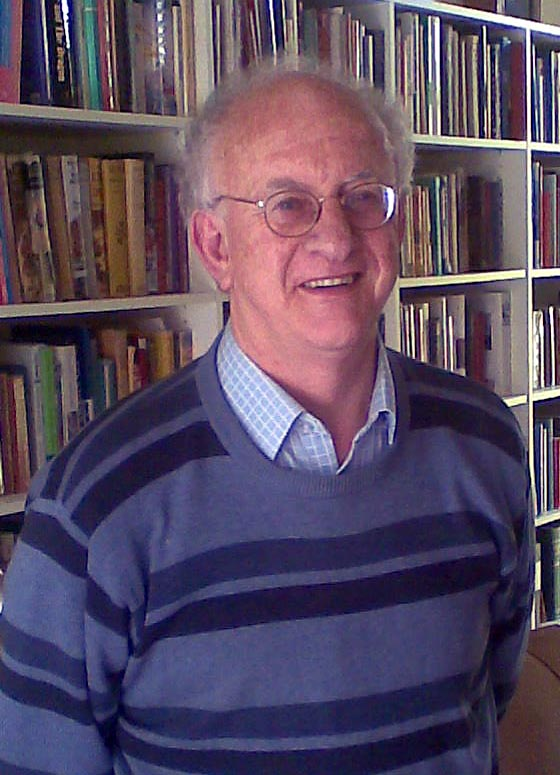
- Born: 12 November 1945
- Occupation: Academic historian

David Robert Walker AM FASSA FAHA (born 12 November 1945) is an Australian academic historian who has been the professor of Australian studies at Deakin University since 1991. He is a leading authority in the study of Australian perceptions of Asia.

== Early life and education ==
Walker was born in Adelaide in 1945 and received his early education in rural South Australian schools where his father was a teacher. The family settled in Adelaide in 1958 and Walker graduated from the University of Adelaide with a first class honours degree in Arts in 1967. Post-graduate studies were undertaken at the Australian National University (ANU) where he was awarded a doctorate in 1972. His thesis, which explored Vance Palmer, Louis Esson and other twentieth-century Australian authors' hopes for the development of an Australian culture, was subsequently published as Dream and Disillusion: A Search for Australian Cultural Identity.

== Academic career ==
Walker spent the next two years as a postdoctoral research fellow at Australian National University (ANU), where he was the editor of Labor History. He then held a number of academic positions at the University of Auckland and the University of New South Wales until his appointment as the Professor of Australian Studies at Deakin University. He has a number of visiting appointments including a Distinguished Visiting Chair of Australian Studies at the University of Copenhagen, the Monash Chair of Australian Studies at Georgetown University and a Visiting Professorship in Australian Studies at the Australian Studies Centre, Renmin University, Beijing.

== Major works ==
Walker has received more than 30 major research grants and published more than 120 books, book chapters, peer reviewed journal articles and peer reviewed lectures. Much of his work has concentrated on the history of Australia's engagement with Asia and, in particular, the ways in which Australians imagined Asian peoples and their cultures.

=== Anxious Nation ===
The results of his research on Asia were published as Anxious Nation: Australia and the Rise of Asia 1850–1939 in 1999. This landmark work explores the anxiety that Australians felt towards the people of Asia during the late nineteenth and early twentieth century. While Australian images of Asia were overwhelmingly negative during this period, Walker makes the point that some Australians including Prime Minister Alfred Deakin saw much to admire in Asian cultures. Al Grassby, former Minister for Immigration who dismantled the White Australia Policy, described the book as "evocative and compelling prose …which shows how bigotry and myth making shaped the question of race which dominated the public and private discourse." Anxious Nation has been reprinted in an India edition and translated into Chinese.

=== Not Dark Yet ===
In late 2004, David Walker, suffered a sudden and severe loss of sight that rendered him legally blind and limited his ability to continue archival research. He subsequently changed his research methods and drew on his family history as a tool to investigate the development of Australia’s national character and culture. This led to the publication of Not Dark Yet: A personal history which has been described by Phillip Adams as "an evocative portrait of 20th century Australia …the attitudes, idiosyncrasies and prejudices of the era."

=== Stranded Nation ===
Stranded Nation: White Australia in an Asian Region is the sequel to "Anxious Nation" published by UWAP in 2019. Drawing on a wide variety of resources including archival records, literature and personal stories, this volume covers the evolution of Australia's engagement with Asia in the period of World War II and into the 1970s. This period saw Australia as a ‘white’ nation, with deep anxieties about Asia, seeking to convince both itself and its neighbours that it belonged within the Asian region. As Britain’s withdrew to Europe, Australia found an urgent need to come to an accommodation with Asia resulting in a desire for a greater understanding of the "Asian Psyche" and a gradual breaking down of the White Australia Policy.

=== The Story of Australia ===
The Story of Australia (2021) written with Louise C. Johnson and Tanja Lukins provides a comprehensive introduction to Australia’s history and geography. This new history integrates a rich body of scholarship from many disciplines and uses a wide variety of sources from government reports and newspaper accounts to diaries, novels and art. It places emphasis on First Australians, women, the environment, and urban Australia along with Australia’s history as an Asia Pacific nation.

=== Happy Together: Bridging the Australia China Divide ===
Happy Together: Bridging the Australia China Divide (Melbourne University Press) jointly written by Walker and Li Yao with the assistance of Karen Walker will be published in June 2022. The book tells the story of Li Yao, the foremost translator of Australian writing into Chinese. In the late nineteenth century, the Li family left famine-stricken Shanxi province in northern China to begin a new life on the remote grasslands of Inner Mongolia. Li Yao grew up in Mao’s China and dreamed of becoming a writer. His dreams were torn apart by the Cultural Revolution. Li Yao’s story is interwoven with that of his friend David Walker. Both men were born at the same time (they are both Roosters by the Chinese zodiac) but grew up in very different worlds.

== Other work ==
Walker has co-edited Australia’s Asia: from Yellow Peril to Asian Century a selection of essays on the Australian engagement with Asia which was released in late 2012. In January 2013, Walker also published a collection of essays entitled Encountering Turbulence: Asia in the Australian Imaginary.

== BHP Chair of Australian Studies ==
In November 2012, Walker was appointed as the inaugural BHP Professor in Australian Studies at Peking University. The chair was an initiative of the Australia-China Council, the Foundation for Australian Studies in China, BHP, Peking University and the Australian Department of Industry and was the first high-profile, privately funded Australian professorial position in China.

In announcing Professor Walker's appointment, the Australian Minister for Trade, Craig Emerson said that the chair was an indication of the Australian government's commitment to encouraging Australia students to look to Asia as their future. It was consistent with the government response to the "Australia in the Asian Century White Paper", which aimed to have more Australian university students studying overseas and a greater proportion undertaking part of their degree in an Asian country by 2025.

Emerson praised Walker as an outstanding ambassador for Australian education who would engage with Chinese researchers, students, government and the community to lift the profile of studies of Australian society, history and culture. Walker would also provide academic leadership to a network of more than 30 Australian Studies Centres in Chinese universities, which has been supported by the Australia-China Council for two decades.

Professor Walker retired from the Chair in 2016 but has continued to support Australian Studies Centres throughout China.

== Awards and fellowships ==
The Academy of the Social Sciences in Australia elected Walker a fellow in 2001 and the Australian Academy of the Humanities bestowed the same honour in 2005. He received the Ernest Scott prize following the publication of Anxious Nation.

In April 2012, Walker became the Alfred Deakin Professor of Australian Studies, the highest honour that Deakin University can bestow on its academic staff.

Walker was awarded Membership of the Order of Australia (AM) in the 2018 Queen's Birthday Honours.
