= Australian studies =

Academic field of cultural studies of Australia

Australian Coat of Arms

Australian studies forms part of the academic field of cultural studies. It involves an examination of what constructs Australia's national identity. This area of scholarship traditionally involves the study of Australian history, society and culture but can be extended to the study of Australian politics and economics. This area of scholarship also includes the study of Australia's Indigenous population, Aboriginals and Torres Strait Islanders.

Scholarship in Australian studies is offered at many Tertiary Institutions and topics within the field form part of the primary and secondary Australian Curriculum.

== Australian history ==
The study of Australian history involves the exploration of past events and significant people that define Australia's present. Scholarship in early Australian history encompasses the history of the Indigenous and colonial societies as well as the history of European colonisation and settlement. The studies of Aboriginal Australian history dates back 65,000 years ago when humans first populated Australia. The exact arrival of Aboriginal Australians has however been a topic of dispute among historians and archaeologists, with the accepted period being between 40,000 and 80,000 years. European colonisation and settlement in Australia in 1788 marks a prominent point in Australia's history. Within the study of Australia, there is criticism of the academic portrayal of Australian history. Historians and academics have argued that since European colonisation, Australians of European descent have recounted Australian history to "favour the coloniser perspective", oppressing the Indigenous Australian perspective.

== Australian society and culture ==
The study of Australian society and culture examines the historical and shifting social makeup of Australia and the resulting dominant cultures. An academic study in this field explores Australian society and culture both before and after European settlement and the migration of global miners to the country.

A study of Australia's society and culture before European colonisation, consists of Indigenous Australian colonies and their individual cultural beliefs. Post-Colonisation led to a form of "Settler Society in the Australian Colonies". The cultural study of this society involves an analysis of the interactions between the Indigenous people, European settlers and "non-White immigrants".

A study into Australia's cultural shift from Indigenous to predominantly Western culture can be seen as a result of interactions between Indigenous Australians and European settlers. These interactions ranged from civil to violent, with the diseases brought to Australia by the Europeans taking a significant toll on the Indigenous population and culture. Historian Geoffrye Blainey believed, "the main conqueror of Aborigines was to be disease and its ally, demoralisation". European settlers had developed some resistance to Smallpox through early exposure, so when the disease broke out in Australia in 1789, these settlers were largely unaffected. However, without previous exposure to the virus, the Indigenous Australia population had no resistance and an estimated 70% were killed. Of the remaining indigenous population, many lost their land and culture when they were forced to resettle on reserves, and thousands of children were removed from their families and placed in institutions, becoming the Stolen Generations, unable to practice their ancestor's culture. This resulted in the social makeup of the country dramatically changing, and European culture becoming mainstream.

A study into Australia's culture post-1980s, largely reflects its British penal history as well as the 'waves of migration from elsewhere in Europe and almost every other continent'. During the colonial era, English literature, Western art and Judeo-Christian religion dominated settler's cultural outlook. The Australian gold rushes then encouraged the migration of people from around the world to the Australian continent. This multi-ethnic immigration lead to a series of policies that favoured migrants from British descent such as the White Australia Policy. These were later dismantled by government promotion of multiculturalism, leading to increased migration of European, Asian and Middle Eastern people to Australia. While a study of contemporary Australian culture will still show the British cultural influence as remaining prominent, Australia's promotion of multiculturalism has led to other nation's influences becoming increasingly prominent.

== Australian politics and economics ==
Australian studies may also involve an analysis of Australian politics and economics. The study of Australian politics involves all aspects of Australia's past and present political system. This area of study can be divided into pre and post-federation. Pre-federation, Australia consisted of six British colonies "under the law-making of the British Parliament".

After Federation in 1901, Australia established a "federal system of government" under the Australian constitution. Studies post-federation focus on Australia's political system as a representative democracy. This includes; the democratic system of government, the role of parliament in Australia, government departments, international programs and all government mandated policies and publications.

The study of Australian economics encompasses the Australian economy and the past and present economic environments. Within this field of study, common topics include; Australia's macro and micro economic structure, policies, trends, governance and the structure of the Australian economy in terms of industry contribution. Also relevant is the history and role of the Reserve Bank of Australia (RBA). This field of study outlines the role of Australia's central bank and banknote issuing authority since the Reserve Bank Act 1959 was passed in 1960.

== Indigenous Australian studies ==
Aboriginal Australian Flag

The scholarship of Indigenous Australian studies involves Aboriginal and Torres Strait Islander cultures, history and beliefs systems. Australia's Indigenous people are made up of two distinct cultural groups; Aboriginal and Torres Strait Islander peoples. Within this field of study, the social and political influence of colonisation and decolonisation on Indigenous Australian groups is analysed. Some Academics believe that within this field of study, there is "scant attention paid" to how the colonisation process impacted social, economic and cultural experiences of Indigenous Australians today, such as the systemic disparities in health and between indigenous and non-indigenous Australians.

Indigenous Australian studies also examines contemporary Aboriginal and Torres Strait Islander culture and society. This population is gradually growing from 2.5% of the population of Australia in 2011 to 3.3% in 2016. Since the 'Close the Gap' campaign was launched in 2007, in response to the Social Justice Report 2005, awareness and recognition of Indigenous civilisation and culture has grown significantly.

== Australian studies at educational institutions ==
Australian studies forms part of the Australian national curriculum and is offered by many Australian and international tertiary institutions.

=== Australian Curriculum ===
The national curriculum in Australia, Australian Curriculum, is created by the Australian Government Department of Education, Skills and Employment and provides an outline of what students in primary and high school should learn. This outline is regardless of their location within Australia or school system. Within the Australian Curriculum, Australian studies is predominantly taught within the humanities and social sciences. The curriculum also stipulates two cross-cultural priorities that sit within the study of Australia; Asia and Australia's engagement with Asia, and Aboriginal and Torres Strait Islander histories and cultures.

=== Tertiary Institutions ===
Australian studies is a course offered at many tertiary institutions both within Australia and internationally. The subject can fall under broader disciplines such as Cultural Studies or Political and International Studies.

== Institutes ==
=== Australian Institute of Aboriginal and Torres Strait Islander Studies ===
The Australian Institute of Aboriginal and Torres Strait Islander Studies (AIATSIS) is a government-funded institution focused on the "diverse history, cultures and heritage" of the Indigenous Australian Population. This institute was established under the Public Governance, Performance and Accountability Act 2013. The institute facilitates the studies and understanding of Indigenous Australians by collecting items of cultural value, conducting research on communities, publishing pieces of work by Indigenous Australians, and facilitating collaborations and partnerships with government, academic, corporate and community sectors.

=== Australian Studies Institute ===
The Australian Studies Institute was founded by The Australian National University (ANU). The institute was established to promote the study of Australia as part of its 'Australia and the World' global engagement program. The institute is led by Professor Paul Pickering and facilitates various global engagement programs with universities and leading cultural institutions. These programs aim to promote the exchange of knowledge, research and resources between people studying Australia-related studies and the institute.

=== Other institutes ===
- Australian Studies Centre in Beijing, China
- American Association for Australian Literary Studies
- Centre for Australian Studies, Nicolaus Copernicus University in Toruń
- Centre for Australian Studies, University of Cologne
- Menzies Australia Institute at King's College London

== Journals ==
- Journal of Australian Studies (JAS)
- Australian Literary Studies
- Australian Studies
- Australian Studies Journal | Zeitschrift für Australienstudien (ASJ|ZfA)

== See also ==
- Education in Australia
- List of universities in Australia
