= The Chalon Heads =

1999 crime novel by Australian author Barry Maitland

- Author: Barry Maitland
- Language: English
- Genre: Novel
- Publisher: Allen and Unwin
- Publication date: 1999
- Publication place: Australia
- Media type: Print
- Pages: 326 pp.
- Awards: 2000 Barry Award finalist
- ISBN: 1865080470
- Preceded by: All My Enemies
- Followed by: Silvermeadow

The Chalon Heads is a 1999 crime novel by the Australian author Barry Maitland.

It was the fourth novel in the author's Brock and Kola series of novels.

== Synopsis ==
The young wife of ex-criminal Sammy Startling has been kidnapped and the ransom note was decorated with Chalon Head stamps of the young Queen Victoria. These stamps are both rare and valuable and detectives Kathy Killa and David Brock go to Cabot's philately store to meet Startling and investigate the crime.

== Publishing history ==
After its initial publication in Australia by Allen and Unwin in 1999, it was reprinted as follows:

- 1999, UK, Orion
- 2000, Australia, Allen and Unwin
- 2000, UK, Orion
- 2001, USA, Arcade
- 2002, USA, Penguin
- 2007, Australia, Allen and Unwin
- 2010, USA, Felony & Mayhem Press

The novel was also translated into Russian in 2008.

== Epigraph ==
- Epigraph: "Philately: The term was coined in 1864 by a Frenchman, Georges Herpin, who invented it from the Greek philos, 'love', and ateleia, 'that which is tax-free'. Britannica Online, 1997."

== Critical reception ==
A reviewer in The Canberra Tmes noted: "This is a very carefully crafted crime novel that is rich in detail and interesting minor characters. The plotting is suitably serpentine and Maitland keeps us on our toes with some very unexpected turns. The plot unfolds at a good pace, helped along by a couple of well-staged chase scenes and a particularly grisly discovery...Stamp collectors will also probably find the philatelic detail interesting and there is even an Australian angle in the form of the three Chalon Head stamps from Van Diemen's Land which are central to the plot...Overall The Chalon Heads is very good, although Brock lacks the distinctive edge to make him, and the series, stand out from the rest of the very good British police novels that are around."

Stuart Coupe in The Sydney Morning Herald was very enthusiastic about the novel: "The Chalon heads is significantly better than almost all the police procedural novels I've read in recent years, with Maitland displaying an impressive and convincing grasp of the machinations and motivations of working police officers, their strengths, weaknesses and foibles. This novel is right up there with the best contemporary crime fiction and, with Allen & Unwin in Australia and Orion Books in Britain as Mailtand's new publishers, one can but hope the author gains the increased international recognition he so clearly deserves."

== Awards ==
- 2000 Barry Award - Best British Crime Novel finalist

== See also ==
- 1999 in Australian literature
