= The Wooden Leg of Inspector Anders =

Book by Marshall Browne

- First edition
- Author: Marshall Browne
- Language: English
- Series: Inspector Anders
- Genre: Crime novel
- Publisher: Duffy & Snellgrove, Australia
- Publication date: 1999
- Publication place: Australia
- Media type: Print (Paperback)
- Pages: 224
- ISBN: 9781876631154
- Preceded by: The Gilded Cage
- Followed by: The Burnt City

The Wooden Leg of Inspector Anders (1999) is a crime novel by Australian author Marshall Browne. It won the 2000 Ned Kelly Award for Best First Novel.

== Plot summary ==
This novel is the first of the author's series of novels about Inspector Anders of the Rome police force.

Ten years before the book begins Anders closed down an anarchist group and lost his leg in the action. Now he has been provided with one last case before his early retirement, an investigation into the murder of a well-respected judge in southern Italy. Anders becomes deeply involved with both the judge's widow and the all-pervading corruption surrounding the investigation as he works towards a conclusion.

== Awards and nominations ==
- 2000 winner Ned Kelly Award — Best First Novel
- 2002 shortlisted The Los Angeles Times Book Prize

== Publishing history ==
After the novel's initial publication by Duffy & Snellgrove in 1999, it was also published as follows:

- Thomas Dunne Books, 1999, USA

It was later translated into Lithuanian.

== See also ==
- 1999 in Australian literature
