= Barry Jonsberg =

Australian author and teacher (born 1951)

- Born: 1951 (age 74–75); Liverpool, England
- Education: University of Liverpool
- Occupations: Author; Teacher
- Notable work: The Whole Business with Kiffo and the Pitbull, My Life as an Alphabet, A Little Spark, Smoke & Mirrors
- Website: Official website

Barry Jonsberg is an Australian author and teacher who was born in Liverpool, England.

== Early life and education ==
Barry Jonsberg earned two degrees, in English and psychology, from Liverpool University.

== Career ==
Jonsberg was a college lecturer in Crewe, Cheshire, before moving to Australia in 1999.

His book The Whole Business with Kiffo and the Pitbull was shortlisted for the 2005 Children's Book Council Award in the Older Readers category and was given a special mention the 2005 White Ravens Selection of International Children's and Youth Literature. It's not all about YOU, Calma won the 2006 South Australian Festival Award for Children's Literature. Dreamrider was shortlisted for the 2007 NSW Premier's Award. The Dog that Dumped on my Doona was shortlisted for the Territory Read Literature Award 2008. My Life as an Alphabet won the 2013 Children's Peace Literature Award for older readers.

His 2022 book, A Little Spark, was shortlisted for the Ethel Turner Prize for Young People's Literature at the 2023 New South Wales Premier's Literary Awards. Smoke & Mirrors was shortlisted for the Young Adult Book Award at the 2024 Queensland Literary Awards and for the 2025 Victorian Premier's Prize for Writing for Young Adults and Ethel Turner Prize for Young People's Literature.

Jonsberg's 2025 book, Darkest Night, Brightest Star, won the Children's Book of the Year Award: Older Readers and was shortlisted for the Ethel Turner Prize for Young People's Literature in 2026.

== Books ==
- The Whole Business with Kiffo and the Pitbull (2005)
- The Crimes and Punishments of Miss Payne (2005)
- It's not all about YOU, Calma (2005)
- Dreamrider (2006)
- Am I Right or Am I Right? (2007)
- The Dog that Dumped on my Doona (August 2008)
- Ironbark (2008)
- Cassie (2008)
- A Croc Called Capone (March 2009)
- Blacky Blasts Back: On the Tail of the Tassie Tiger (January 2010)
- Being Here (2011)
- H is for Happiness
- My Life As An Alphabet (2013) Released September 2014 in America as The Categorical Universe of Candice Phee
- The City of Second Chances (2014)
- Pandora Jones: Admission (2014)
- Pandora Jones: Deception (2014)
- Pandora Jones: Reckoning (2015)
- Game Theory (2016)
- A Song Only I Can Hear (2018)
- Catch me if I fall (2020)
- A Little Spark (2022)
- Smoke & Mirrors (2023)
- Darkest Night, Brightest Star (2025)
