= The Salt of Broken Tears =

1999 novel by Australian author Michael Meehan

- Author: Michael Meehan
- Language: English
- Genre: Literary novel
- Publisher: Vintage Australia
- Publication date: 1999
- Publication place: Australia
- Media type: Print
- Pages: 297 pp.
- Awards: 2000 New South Wales Premier's Literary Awards — Christina Stead Prize for Fiction, winner
- ISBN: 0091839130

The Salt of Broken Tears is a 1999 novel by the Australian author Michael Meehan, originally published by Vintage Australia.

It was the winner of the 2000 New South Wales Premier's Literary Awards, Christina Stead Prize for Fiction.

== Synopsis ==
In 1930s depression Victoria the country is drought sticken and degraded, and a motley collection of characters scrabble a living on the margins. Now two people, young Eileen and the Indian hawker Cabel Singh, have gone missing and "the boy", as that is what he is called, sets out to search for them.

== Critical reception ==
Writing in Australian Book Review John McLaren noted: "The novel itself maintains a silence about some of the mysteries it offers to solve...The true subject of the novel is how its characters learn to live with themselves or, by failing to make the attempt, die to themselves and each other."

Margaret Merrilees, writing in JASAL, considers the boy's search as "an allegorical quest for redemption", commenting that this "masculine quest mirrors the broader Australian longing for redemption, or perhaps absolution."

== Awards ==
- 2000 New South Wales Premier's Literary Awards – Christina Stead Prize for Fiction, winner

== See also ==
- 1999 in Australian literature

== Notes ==
- Dedication: To my parents, Francis and Sheila.
