= Jetty Rats =

Book by Phillip Gwynne

- Author: Phillip Gwynne
- Cover artist: Stella Danalis
- Language: English
- Genre: Young adult fiction
- Set in: Dogleg Bay (fictional)
- Publisher: Penguin Books
- Publication date: 6 February 2004
- Publication place: Australian
- Media type: Paperback
- Pages: 256
- ISBN: 9780143300496

Jetty Rats is a 2004 young-adult fiction novel by Phillip Gwynne. It was his fourth published book, and his third for the young-adult genre. The story follows 13-year-old Hunter Vettori and his quest to catch a mulloway – an evasive fish he has been trying to catch for his whole life. The book is set in the fictional Dogleg Bay, a place with an aging population, where the biggest business is funeral directing.

== Reception ==
Christopher Bantick of The Age opined: "The strength of Gwynne's storytelling is how it washes into us. Like a rock pool, the translucent depths of this fine novel are beguilingly deceptive." Cindy Lord of The Courier-Mail wrote: "Jetty Rats, with its rich and earthy language, and wry observation of an increasingly marginalised country Australia and its "types", celebrates the originality of Australian speech." Mark McCann of The Sydney Morning Herald called it "funny", as well as "clever and insightful".
