= Killing Aurora =

1999 book by Helen Barnes

- First edition cover
- Author: Helen Barnes
- Language: English
- Genre: Youth novel
- Publisher: Penguin Books
- Publication date: 1 May 1999
- Publication place: Australia
- Media type: Print (Paperback)
- Pages: 240 pp (first edition, paperback)
- ISBN: 0-14-130532-0 (first edition, paperback)

Killing Aurora is a novel by Helen Barnes about a girl with anorexia. It was published in 1999 by Penguin Books.

== Plot summary ==
The novel contains two central characters, both fourteen years of age: the first, Aurora Thorpe, has been forced by her overprotective mother and stepfather to attend the prestigious St Dymphna's Non-Denominational Ladies' College. The second, also attending St Dymphna's, is Web Richardson, an outcast from a single parent family. Aurora and Web share a prickly connection, despite Aurora's reluctance to be associated with the terribly unpopular Web.

In an abruptly unfamiliar environment, and under the pressure of family and social expectations, Aurora becomes increasingly concerned with losing weight as a means of achieving the acceptance of her peers and living up to her own rigorous standards. Meanwhile, Web endures life without a mother, having only the scant guidance of her timid father, overbearing aunt, bitter grandfather and volatile older sister to rely on. Web desperately tries to stop Aurora from "disappearing", at the same time struggling with her mother's absence and the need for a friend.

== Release details ==
- 1999, UK, Puffin Books ISBN 0-14-130532-0, Pub date 1 May 1999, paperback
- 1999, UK, Penguin Books ISBN 0-14-028774-4, Pub date ? ? 1999, paperback

== Awards ==
- 2000 winner Victorian Premier's Prize for Writing for Young Adults
- 2000 honour book Children's Book of the Year Award: Older Readers

== See also ==
- 1999 in Australian literature
