= Amaze Your Friends =

1998 novel by Peter Doyle

- Author: Peter Doyle
- Language: English
- Genre: Crime novel
- Publisher: Random House, Melbourne
- Publication date: 1998
- Publication place: Australia
- Media type: Print Paperback
- Pages: 250 pp
- ISBN: 0-09-183656-5 (first edition, paperback)
- OCLC: 38833698
- Preceded by: Get Rich Quick
- Followed by: The Devil's Jump

Amaze Your Friends is a 1998 Ned Kelly Award-winning novel by Australian author Peter Doyle.

This is book 2 in the author's Billy Glasheen series of novels.

== Synopsis ==
Set in Sydney in the 1950s this novel follows Billy Glasheen as he attempts to raise ten thousand pounds to pay off a corrupt police officer. If he can't make that in six months he'll find himself six feet under.

== Critical reception ==
Damo Gay, writing on the Australian Crime Fiction HQ website noted: "Amaze Your Friends is a dark hardboiled crime story that will take a man and subject him to all manner of adversity. It's set in Sydney as the 1950s are drawing to a close, following the attempts of a small-time hustler to come up with some money as quickly as possible. It's a wild and unpredictable ride through the low-life haunts of the city's drug-dens, dealing with corrupt cops while trying to maintain a string of dodgy mail-order scams...At times it's crude and at others it's graphic, but it's most definitely an entertaining read."

== Awards ==
- Ned Kelly Awards for Crime Writing, Best Novel, 1999: winner
