= So Happy Together =

So Happy Together may refer to:

- So Happy Together (album), by Grifters, 1992
- So... Happy Together, a 2004 Filipino film
- "So Happy Together", an episode of the Mighty B!
- A line from "Happy Together", a 1967 song by The Turtles

== See also ==
- So Happy (disambiguation)
- Happy Together (disambiguation)
