= Wrack (novel) =

Novel by James Bradley

- Author: James Bradley
- Cover artist: Vivien Sung
- Language: English
- Genre: Historical fiction Crime fiction Philosophical fiction Romance
- Publisher: Random House Australia
- Publication date: 1997
- Publication place: Australia
- Pages: 352

Wrack is a novel written by Australian author James Bradley. It was first published in 1997 by Random House Australia. The novel centres around archaeologist David Norfolk as he searches for a Portuguese shipwreck off the coast of New South Wales. Wrack is Bradley's first published work of fiction and has been nominated for various awards including the Miles Franklin Award and Australia's Commonwealth Writer's Prize for Best First Book.

Wrack was selected by the Board of Studies, Teaching and Educational Standards to be included in the list of prescribed texts for English in the Higher School Certificate from 1999 to 2000 as well as from 2015 to 2018.

== Plot summary ==
In 1794, the English ship Berkeley is cast upon an unknown shore in New South Wales due to a storm. Upon exploring the land, the crew suddenly stumble across a shipwreck which they believe to be of Portuguese or Spanish origin. They find papers on board when exploring the shipwreck which are dated to 1519. Fearing the implication which this discovery might have on the English claim to Australia, Captain Bells swears the entirety of the crew to secrecy, warning them to never reveal the existence of the shipwreck.

In present day, archaeologist David Norfolk is searching for the wreck of a Portuguese ship on the south coast of New South Wales. He is accompanied on the dig by fellow archaeologist Anna as well as his students. They begin digging in the area where their aerial magnetometer has detected an anomalous signal and discover a body wrapped up in an army blanket. The body is taken away by detectives for examination in Sydney. David is allowed to watch the autopsy and so travels to the police station where he is greeted by Claire, his ex-lover, who he learns is working as a forensic medical examiner for the police. Following her down to the morgue, David watches Claire as she examines the body which they extrapolate to be a Caucasian male from the 20th century who died from four gunshot wounds.

Back at the site, David learns about an old man in a shack nearby who David could potentially question for information. David travels to the shack and meets Kurt Seligmann, an ailing, elderly man with disfigurations on his face and body. When asked about his knowledge on the shipwreck, Kurt tells David to come back the next day. David returns to the archaeological site where Anna and the students have found fragments of farm machinery. Assuming it to be cause of the magnetometer anomaly, the team is disappointed as it marks the end of their expedition. The next day, David visits the shack again in an attempt to get Kurt to talk, but Kurt has a seizure. After treating him, the local doctor tells David that Kurt has inoperable cancer and needs to be hospitalised. David convinces the doctor to let him and Claire move in to nurse and look after Kurt.

Claire arrives and after a while, David manages to convince Kurt to tell his story. While Kurt is recounting his experiences, David reflects on his own life and his obsession with the ship grows, posing a strain on his relationship with Claire. Claire believes that Kurt is leading David on and begins to see the old man's dark nature. Despite this, she stays with David and the two grow closer, emotionally and physically.

In the 1930s, Kurt, as an archaeology university student, hears a lecture disputing the existence of a Portuguese shipwreck off the coast of Australia. Kurt recalls seeing the ship as a boy and his public defence of the ship's existence brings him to the attention of Fraser McDonald, a university lecturer who approaches Kurt to discuss the ship. Kurt becomes Fraser's research assistant despite their different backgrounds. While socialising with the McDonald family, Kurt meets opera singer Veronica Marshall in 1935 and falls in love with her despite the unspoken expectation that she will marry Fraser. Meanwhile, Fraser and Kurt's search for the ship yields no results and they are severely criticised within their department at university for their research. While Kurt is sent away to find more conclusive evidence, Fraser and Veronica engage in a relationship with each other. Fraser and Veronica are married but Veronica pursues an affair with Kurt a few months after the wedding. Although she expresses doubt with their marriage, Veronica is still unwilling to leave Fraser for Kurt.

World War II breaks out in 1939 and both Kurt and Fraser are conscripted to serve in Singapore. Veronica follows them and admits at last that she is in love with Kurt. Veronica is forced to leave when the crisis in Singapore worsens. Meanwhile, Fraser is in danger in Kulai and Kurt searches for him as a way to appease his guilt over his relationship with Veronica. Kurt manages to rescue Fraser and the two drive back to the wharf only to discover that Veronica did not make it onto the ship and is now presumably dead.

Back in Sydney after Singapore's fall, Fraser uncovers a letter between Kurt and Veronica, exposing their affair. Fraser arrives on Kurt's doorstep, inebriated and armed with a revolver. The two fight, and Kurt shoots Fraser four times, revealing that Fraser was the body which David discovered earlier in the novel. Kurt wraps Fraser's corpse in a blanket, buries the body in the beach, destroys any evidence of murder and stages Fraser's death as suicide.

Kurt is drafted to New Guinea, where he is injured, resulting in his disfigurement and an addiction to morphine. After two years in a hospital, Kurt returns to Australia where he continues to search for the ship.

In the present, Kurt reveals that he returned to the sand dunes, bought the shack and began digging for the wreck. David frantically questions Kurt about the ship's location. Laughing, Kurt finally reveals that he in fact found the shipwreck eventually but burnt it to be rid of his past. Leaving David with the nihilistic message that "the past is nothing, and we are nothing", Kurt then dies.

== Background and writing history ==
Wrack is Bradley's first novel. Prior to the writing and publication of Wrack, Bradley studied philosophy and law at the University of Adelaide. After finishing university in 1991, Bradley worked as a lawyer while writing poetry and screenplays before quitting his career in law in order to focus on writing. While writing Wrack, Bradley supported himself by working night shifts at a 24-hour video store in Darlinghurst.

In regards to his writing process, Bradley elucidated in an interview with Catherine Bradshaw during June 1998 that:

"You start out with almost nothing, and you read and think and sketch out ideas, and gradually connections and themes and patterns begin to emerge, so you follow these and see where they take you. And then, at some point, you start to pull it all back in, to weave it back into itself, by making connections between all these threads .... You don't start off with an idea, turn it into a one-page plan, then a ten-page plan, then a novel, which you write chapter by chapter. It's a far messier, more chaotic process than that, where you're trying not only to write something that works, but also to actually work out what it is you're writing as you go along".

Bradley states that development for Wrack began as a fragmentary merge of concepts:

"I remember telling myself I needed to write a new novel, and asking myself quite explicitly what it might be about. A shipwreck, I remember thinking, and people searching for it in the sandhills. And opera, and World War II."

As he recognises himself in the 'Acknowledgements' section at the end of the novel, Bradley was heavily inspired by Kenneth McIntyre's book The Secret Discovery of Australia which linked the theory of Portuguese discovery of Australia with the Mahogany Ship, a putative shipwreck of Portuguese origin supposedly spotted in the 19th century a few kilometres west of Warrnambool, Victoria. Initially, Bradley had planned for the shipwreck in his novel to be of Chinese origin, having been inspired after reading Eric Rolls' book Sojourners which detailed the history of the Chinese in Australia. However, a reference in Rolls' book to the story of the Mahogany ship caused Bradley to change the direction of his novel. Bradley explained in the Bradshaw interview how "the mahogany ship was one of [his] starting points, since it was reading about the ship that led [him] to the story about the maps and the whole dispute about Portuguese exploration in Australia."

Wrack utilised excerpts from various sources that Bradley acknowledged at the end of the novel. These include Lawrence Fitzgerald's Java La Grande: The Portuguese Discovery of Australia, the Shorter Oxford English Dictionary and the Grove Concise Dictionary of Music.

Bradley has commented that the finished novel which he ended up writing completely differed from the one he had initially envisioned.

== Style ==
Wrack is a hybridised bricolage made up of different forms and genres. The novel blends stylistic elements from a vast number of areas including historical fiction, crime fiction, mystery fiction, philosophical fiction and romance. Bradley incorporates a variety of textual forms within the novel including prose, journal entries, historical discussion, letters, and dictionary definitions. Later editions of the book also contain cartographic images of 16th century maps, obtained and reproduced with permission from the British Library and the John Rylands Collection of the University of Manchester. In regards to Wrack's hybridised, unconventional form, Bradley stated in an interview with Patrick Cullen in Opus that he was "very much influenced by [his] experiences as a poet" and that he wanted to "transfer that incredibly potent ... power into prose as much as I can, to try and get at things – moods, feelings, experiences, connections – that are often difficult to get at in conventional prose."

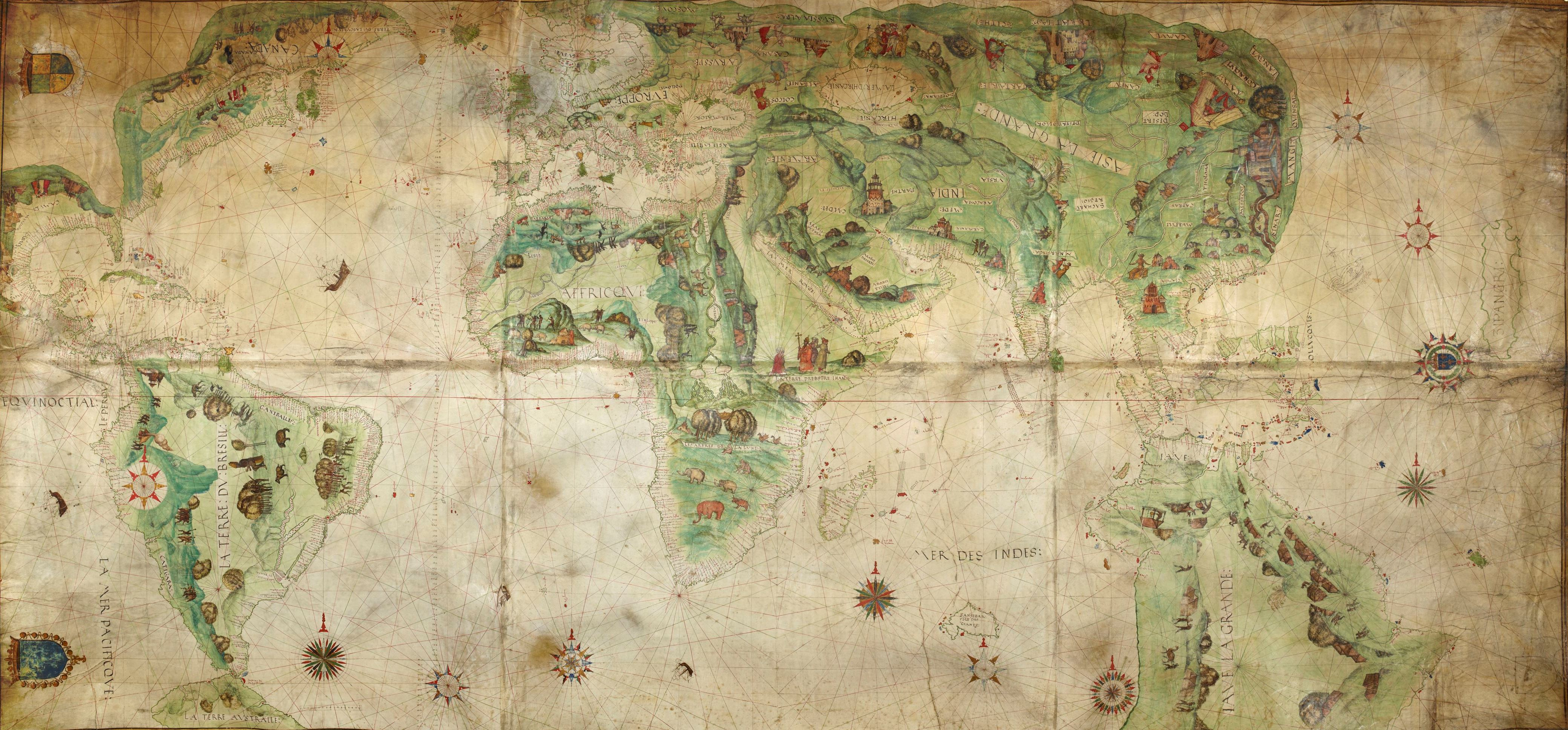
Pierre Desceliers's 'Harleian' World Map (1536) is a subject of discussion in Wrack. It is also one of the four maps which Bradley included as images in later editions of the novel.

Bradley frequently makes intertextual references to other works including those of Neil Gaiman or Michael Ondaatje as epigraphs at the beginning of each chapter. The novel makes use of both first and third person narration.

Wrack is structured into eight main sections and makes use of a non-linear, multiple narrative structure where the three main stories that are being told simultaneously overlap and interconnect at various points in the novel. Flashbacks, interior monologues, varying narrative voices and shifting time frames are literary devices which Bradley frequently employs within the novel.

The multi-layered narrative of the story is often interwoven with seemingly non-fiction discussion on topics relating to cartography and history. Bradley describes such historical material contained within Wrack to be "a combination of fact, fiction, and speculation" because he has taken considerable liberties with moulding the facts and opinions of various sources to fit his fictional purposes.

Bradley commented in an interview with Catherine Bradshaw that "most of the time in Wrack I used very sparse, denuded language, which is designed to reflect the simplicity and emptiness of the dunes and the sea, which are big parts of the imagery".

The novel contains no quotation marks or attribution of speech, meaning the dialogue of the text is merged with the authorial monologue and narration. This also results in the blurring of voices as it becomes harder for the reader to distinguish who is saying what.

== Themes ==
According to Bradshaw, discovery is a central theme to Wrack because the novel not only incorporates ideas of historical and scientific discoveries of archaeologists and explorers but also the personal and emotional discoveries which the characters of the story undergo. Wrack was selected by the Board of Studies, Teaching and Educational Standards to be included in the list of prescribed texts for study in a conceptual exploration of "Discovery" in the Higher School Certificate from 2015 to 2018. The text had also been previously featured in the topic area "Discovery" for English during the 1999 and 2000 HSC.

The veracity of history is another prominent theme in Wrack which questions the notion of an absolute and unequivocal voice of truth and draws on concepts of historical revisionism. As Bradley stated in an interview for Stephen Muecke's "Maps of the Heart" in The Australian Review of Books on 12 March 1997:

I also wanted to use the fictional histories within the real history ... to play a sort of metafictional game by emphasising the slipperiness of the actual history and the uncertainty of it all – how much is 'true' and how much is just a story we make 'true' with our own need for certainty.

English educator Bruce Pattinson and senior English teacher Marian Thomas both comment that Wrack explores the complexity of relationships by illuminating the degree of intricacy in David and Claire's relationship and by paralleling the wartime love triangle of Kurt, Fraser and Veronica with David, Claire and Paul (or Anna). Other thematic concerns which resonate through the novel involve concepts of ambiguity, illusion, memory and obsession.

== Publication and reception ==
=== Publication history ===
Wrack was originally published in Australia during 1997 by Random House Australia. The novel was first published in the United Kingdom in 1998 by Headline and in the United States in 1999 by Henry Holt and Company, Inc. Multiple editions of the novel have since been published including a 2009 edition by Faber and Faber. Later editions of the book contain added material, specifically cartographic images of 16th century maps and an amended 'Acknowledgements' section which give recognition to the British Library and the John Rylands Collection of the University of Manchester for granting permission for the reproduction of such images. In 2009, an audio book version of the novel was released by Bolinda Publishing with narration by Humphrey Bower.

=== Reception ===
Wrack was met with generally positive reviews from critics who praised the form and the multi-genre nature of the novel. Sybil Steinberg for Publishers Weekly described Wrack as a "seamless fusion of dramatic wartime love story, historical fiction and archeological murder mystery" and commended Bradley's skill in interweaving the novel's elements together to "create a graceful mediation on death, ambition and obsession". In a review for The Observer, Mary Fitzgerald stated that Wrack is "occasionally marred by Bradley's florid prose" but concluded that the novel is "a captivating story none the less". David Callahan, an associate professor of English at the University of Aveiro, praised Wrack in his review in the journal Antipodes for its structure and its intertwining connections but criticised Bradley for his "lazy locutions" and his inaccurate references to Portuguese history which "give the impression of someone who hasn't done his homework." Deloris Tarzan Ament of the Seattle Times stated that the lack of quotation marks in the novel may be problematic for readers but called Wrack "impressively ambitious" and applauded Bradley's "brief bursts of poetic reflection".

Wrack won the Fellowship of Australian Writers' Literature Award as well as the Kathleen Mitchell Literary Award. The novel also received nominations for various other awards including the Miles Franklin Award and Australia's Commonwealth Writer's Prize for Best First Book.

Following the publication of Wrack, Bradley was named a Best Young Australian Novelist in 1998 by the Sydney Morning Herald.
