= Swerve (novel) =

Book by Phillip Gwynne

- Author: Phillip Gwynne
- Language: English
- Genre: Young adult fiction
- Set in: Between Sydney and Uluru
- Publisher: Penguin Books
- Publication date: August 31, 2009
- Publication place: Australia
- Media type: Paperback
- Pages: 228
- ISBN: 9780143009337

Swerve is a 2009 novel by Australian author Phillip Gwynne. It follows a boy named Hugh, a successful young cellist who lives in Sydney. His grandfather takes him on a trip to Uluru, where many mishaps happen.

== Plot ==
Hugh is a successful young cellist, who is born into a rich family of businesspeople. He has one sister, whom he nicknames Moreton, after a tree. He is very interested in motor racing, and, on multiple occasions, says he is "obsessed with cars".

At the start of the book, his grandfather, who is not on speaking terms with the rest of his family, and whom he refers to as Poppy, calls him and asks him to go to Uluru with him. Confused, Hugh says no at first, but is convinced by the number of hours he will be able to earn on his drivers' licence – he has a learners' (70) – and the fact that he would be able to drive a Holden HT Monaro GTS 350. Hugh has an audition to attend soon, urging him to get to Uluru faster during the trip.

For the first night Hugh and Poppy stay at a goldpanner's cabin, run by a "Viking-like" man named Alf and his wife Val. This is the first time Hugh and Poppy meet Roberto and Cateano, two men from São Paulo, headed for Uluru for a religious event called "The Gathering". The next day, they do a lap of the Mount Panorama Circuit, a famous racing track, and end up racing another, rival car.

== Reception ==
Swerve was reviewed by Aussie Reviews, who wrote: "Young car-lovers will love the road trip, but there is something for every teen, with issues, humour, adventure and even mystery".

Swerve was shortlisted for the Young adult literature prize at the 2010 Prime Minister's Literary Awards.
