= So Happy (disambiguation) =

"So Happy" is a 1989 studio album by Eddie Murphy.

So Happy may also refer to:

- "So Happy" (Theory of a Deadman song), 2008
- "So Happy" (Tony Moran song), featuring Jason Walker, 2016
- "So Happy" / "Send It", a 2021 single by Bliss n Eso

== Other ==
- So Happy (horse), an American thoroughbred race horse

== See also ==
- So Happy Together (disambiguation)
- Happy (disambiguation)
