= Australian Rules (film) =

- Theatrical release poster
- Directed by: Paul Goldman
- Screenplay by: Paul Goldman; Phillip Gwynne
- Based on: Deadly, Unna? and Nukkin Ya by Phillip Gwynne
- Produced by: Mark Lazarus
- Starring: Nathan Phillips; Luke Carroll; Lisa Flanagan; Kevin Harrington
- Cinematography: Mandy Walker
- Edited by: Stephen Evans
- Music by: Mick Harvey
- Production company: Beyond Productions
- Distributed by: Beyond Distribution
- Release dates: 5 March 2002 (Adelaide Festival of Arts); 29 August 2002 (Australia)
- Running time: 95 minutes
- Country: Australia
- Language: English
- Box office: $2.5 million

Australian Rules is a 2002 Australian sports drama film directed by Paul Goldman and starring Nathan Phillips, Luke Carroll, Tom Budge, Brian Torry and Lisa Flanagan. It was adapted from the novels Deadly, Unna? (1998) and Nukkin Ya by Phillip Gwynne. The film is about a young man experiencing the hardships of growing up in rural South Australia. In particular, it deals with the issue of racial relationships through the central characters, their involvement in local football, and Aboriginal players. It was launched at the Adelaide Festival of Arts on 5 March 2002, and nationwide on 29 August 2002.

== Plot ==
In the isolated and fictional South Australian fishing town of Prospect Bay, the only thing that connects the black and white communities is football. Gary "Blacky" Black (Nathan Phillips) and Dumby Red (Luke Carroll) are an exception; teenage best friends from different sides of the tracks. Dumby is the star of the football team and likely to become the next Aboriginal star in the big leagues. Gary is the bookish son of hard-drinking and brutal fisherman Bob Black (Simon Westaway). He is attracted to Dumby's sister, Clarence (Lisa Flanagan). Blacky's supportive mother helps him become a better player as he is chosen to be the ruckman in the team's upcoming grand final. Blacky has to overcome Thumper, the star player for the opposition. When gameday arrives Blacky at first struggles to make an impact on the game but Dumby inspires the team, kicking several goals. When Dumby gets a mark near goals with the scores tied he hands it off to a teammate instead of taking the shot. The player kicks a point and Blacky has to run into Thumper to stop him from kicking the winning goal. Their team wins the premiership, but Dumby and Blacky's elation is short-lived. Dumby is passed over for the best-on-ground medal for the coach's son Mark Robertson. Dumby is disgusted and angered by the obvious racially motivated decision.

Disgruntled, Dumby and his cousin Pretty (Tony Briggs) attempt to rob the bar where the celebrations were held, hoping to find the best-on-ground medal. After breaking into the bar, they meet the drunk owner, beat him into unconsciousness and proceed to the safe with the key found in his pocket. Bob, waking to find the owner unconscious with a head wound, heads to the office and loads a double-barrelled shotgun. Bob sneaks up behind Dumby and fires a shot into the figure in the darkness. Bob discovers he has killed Dumby. Pretty, who has been hiding behind the door, jumps him and points the gun at his neck. Pretty reveals himself by removing his makeshift balaclava. He does not shoot Bob but fires the remaining round into the ceiling and runs away into the darkness. Bob is questioned by police over the shooting but is let off on the grounds of self-defence. Blacky is devastated over Dumby's death and angrily tosses his premiership trophy into the ocean. Clarence and Blacky console each other and fall in love. Bob and the family are greeted with hostility and harassed by some local Aboriginal people which only further fuels Bob's violent temper and bigotry.

Clarence sneaks into Blacky's room one night and they have sex. The next morning Bob discovers them in bed and beats Blacky. He racially insults Clarence and throws her out. Fed up with his father, Blacky leaves. Blacky meets with Dumby's family and attends his funeral. He acquires the best-on-ground medal and places it in Dumby's casket. After returning home he is confronted by Bob and is told he is no longer welcome in his house due to his relationship with Clarence. Blacky defiantly stands still even after Bob punches him repeatedly. Defeated and exhausted, Bob leaves the family never to come back. The football team is disbanded as no Aboriginal players show up to training or games. The film ends with Blacky and Clarence jumping into the ocean and swimming in the water. Blacky narrates that they will both be leaving soon, as there is nothing left for them in this town.

== Cast ==
- Nathan Phillips as Gary 'Blacky' Black
- Simon Westaway as Bob Black
- Celia Ireland as Liz Black
- Harrison Gilbertson as Greggy
- Kelton Pell as Tommy Red
- Luke Carroll as Dumby Red
- Tony Briggs as Pretty Red
- Lisa Flanagan as Clarence Red
- Tom Budge as Pickles
- Kevin Harrington as Mr. Robertson 'Arks'
- Martin Vaughan as Darcy
- Rhys van Nek as himself
- Max Fairchild as Big Mac

== Awards ==
Awards
Award	Category	Recipient(s)	Outcome
Film Critics Circle of Australia Awards 2002
Film Critics Circle of Australia Awards 2002	Best Supporting Actor – Female	Celia Ireland	Won
Film Critics Circle of Australia Awards 2002	Best Supporting Actor – Male	Simon Westaway	Won
Film Critics Circle of Australia Awards 2002	Best Actor – Male	Nathan Phillips	Nominated
Film Critics Circle of Australia Awards 2002	Best Cinematography	Paul Goldman	Nominated
Film Critics Circle of Australia Awards 2002	Best Film	Paul Goldman	Nominated
Film Critics Circle of Australia Awards 2002	Best Screenplay – Adapted	Paul Goldman	Nominated
Film Critics Circle of Australia Awards 2002	Best Supporting Actor – Male	Luke Carroll	Nominated
Film Critics Circle of Australia Awards 2002	Best Supporting Actor – Female	Lisa Flanagan	Nominated
Australian Film Institute Awards 2002	Best Screenplay Adapted from Another Source	Paul Goldman	Won
Australian Film Institute Awards 2002	Best Actor in Supporting Role	Luke Carroll	Nominated
Australian Film Institute Awards 2002	Best Actress in Supporting Role	Celia Ireland	Nominated
Australian Film Institute Awards 2002	Best Film	Australian Rules	Nominated
Australian Film Institute Awards 2002	Best Original Music Score		Nominated
Australian Film Institute Awards 2002	Best Sound	Australian Rules	Nominated
Verona Love Screens Film Festival 2003	Audience Award	Paul Goldman	Won
Verona Love Screens Film Festival 2003	Youth Jury Award – Special Mention	Paul Goldman	Won
Verona Love Screens Film Festival 2003	Best Film	Paul Goldman	Nominated
Inside Film Awards 2002	Best Actor	Nathan Phillips	Nominated
Inside Film Awards 2002	Best Feature Film		Nominated
Inside Film Awards 2002	Best Production Design		Nominated
Inside Film Awards 2002	Best Script		Nominated
Australian Screen Sound Guild Awards 2002	Best Achievement in Sound for a Feature Film		Won
ARIA Music Awards 2003	Best Original Soundtrack Album	Mick Harvey	Won
Humanitas Prize 2002	Sundance Film Category	Australian Rules	Nominated

== See also ==
- Cinema of Australia
