= The Malcontenta =

1995 crime novel by Australian writer Barry Maitland

- First edition (UK)
- Author: Barry Maitland
- Language: English
- Series: Brock and Kolla
- Genre: Novel
- Publisher: Hamish Hamilton (UK); Arcade Publishing (US)
- Publication date: 1995
- Publication place: Australia
- Media type: Print Hardback & Paperback
- Pages: 348 pp
- ISBN: 0-241-13461-7 (first edition, hardback)
- OCLC: 32931955
- Preceded by: The Marx Sisters
- Followed by: All My Enemies

The Malcontenta is a 1995 Ned Kelly Award-winning novel by the Australian author Barry Maitland.

== Critical reception ==
Writing in The Canberra Times Peter Bowler noted: "Professor Maitland's writing has all the special strengths that one would expect in an architect: structural soundness, a feeling for the shape and romance of his mise en scene, and, as a bonus for the reader, an element of interesting architectural instruction. More surprisingly, it has none of the classic weaknesses of the profession. He gets on with the job. "

== Awards ==
- Ned Kelly Awards for Crime Writing, Best Novel, 1996: joint winner

== Publication history ==
After its initial publication in the uk in 1995 by Hamish Hamilton, the novel was reprinted as follows:

- Penguin, UK 1996
- Arcade, USA, 2000
- Orion, UK 2000
- Penguin, USA 2001

The novel has been translated into German (Ein Hauch von Angst, 1995), French (La malcontenta, 2000) and Italian (Malcontenta, 2002).

== Dedication ==
"Dedication: For Clare and Alex/With my very special thanks to Margaret, and to those people who have helped bring Brock and Cathy [sic] to print, in particular Kate Jones and Jill Hickson."

== Notes ==
- This is the second novel in the author's Brock and Kolla series.
- The title of this novel as published in the U.S. is The Malcontenta: A Kathy and Brock Mystery

== Reviews ==
- "Australian Crime Fiction database"
- "Italian Mysteries"

== See also ==
- 1995 in Australian literature
