= Happy Together: Bridging the Australia-China Divide =

Book by David Walker and Li Yao (2022)

Happy Together: Bridging the Australia China Divide
- Author: David Walker, Li Yao with the assistance of Karen Walker
- Subject: Autobiography
- Genre: Non-fiction
- Set in: China; Australia
- Published: Melbourne
- Publisher: Melbourne University Press
- Publication date: 15 June 2022
- Media type: Paperback
- ISBN: 9780522878554
- Website: https://www.mup.com.au/books/happy-together-electronic-book-text Melbourne University Press

Happy Together: Bridging the Australia China Divide, jointly written by David Walker and Li Yao with the assistance of Karen Walker, is a book that was published in June 2022.

== Synopsis ==
The book tells the story of Li Yao, the foremost translator of Australian writing into Chinese. In the late nineteenth century, the Li family left famine-stricken Shanxi province in northern China to begin a new life on the remote grasslands of Inner Mongolia. Li Yao grew up in Mao's China and dreamed of becoming a writer. His dreams were torn apart by the Cultural Revolution. Li Yao's story is interwoven with that of his friend David Walker. Both men were born at the same time (they are both Roosters by the Chinese zodiac) but grew up in very different worlds. This book illuminates not only personal histories but also China's relations with Australia and the wider world.

== Reception ==
Australia's first ambassador to the People's Republic of China, Stephen FitzGerald has described Happy Together as "A rare and fascinating book giving a completely new perspective on Australia and China In writing that is at times elegiac and very moving. Li Yao’s story evokes what it was actually like to be tossed in those violent political currents that tore China apart in the mid-20th century. The ingenuity of the book lies in the interwoven story of fellow author, David Walker. Together these stories provide a metaphor for the vastly different histories of China and Australia over the last century".

The novelist Alexis Wright found the book to be "(a) richly detailed memoir that takes us on a remarkable journey through a tumultuous period of Chinese history. It is also an unforgettable celebration of a friendship between renowned scholar and gifted translator Li Yao, and David Walker, a distinguished Australian historian which bridges cultures, history, and life experience. An inspiring and insightful story for our times, and all times."

In the Melbourne Asia Review Professor David S. G. Goodman noted: "For anyone interested in these two creative writers, this book is essential reading; and to some extent it provides insights generally into the backgrounds of professional intellectuals of those kinds. It is thought appropriate that Li Yao's story is clearly the main point of the exercise for translation is the core of this book."
