= Marshall Browne =

Australian writer (1935–2014)

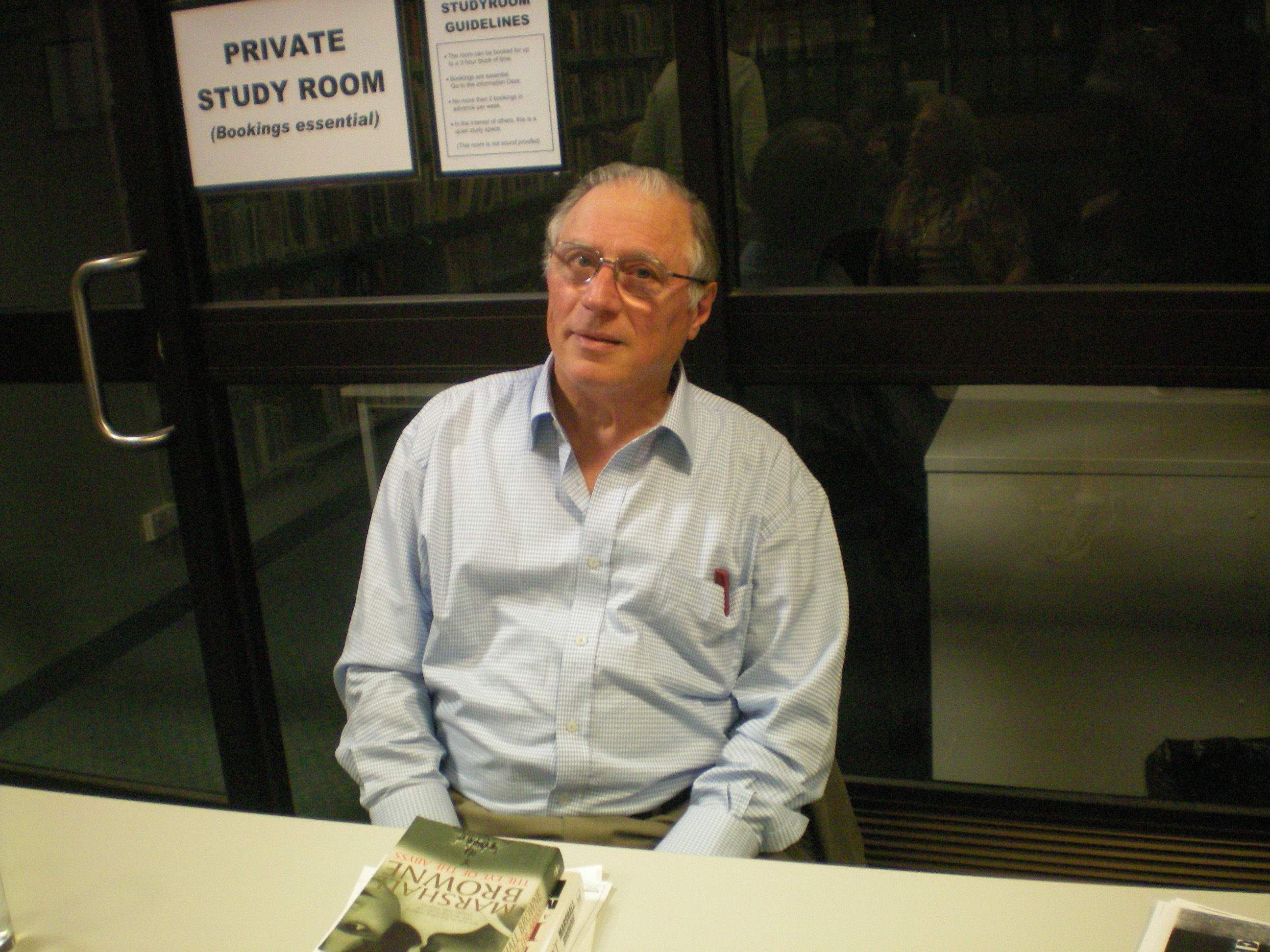
- Born: 27 November 1935; Melbourne, Victoria, Australia
- Died: 14 February 2014 (aged 78); Melbourne, Victoria, Australia
- Occupation: Author

Marshall Browne (27 November 1935 – 14 February 2014) was an Australian crime fiction writer.

== Biography ==
A former merchant banker, Browne lived in Hong Kong, London, and Bhutan. He later lived in Melbourne. He served as a commando in the Australian forces, and as a paratrooper in the British forces. At the age of 22, he considered joining the French Foreign Legion. However, after meeting his future wife, Browne decided to commit to a career as a banker, following the example of his great-great-grandfather, William Browne, who had founded Australia's first bank. He ultimately spent 37 years working for the National Australia Bank.

Browne's wife Merell was an interior designer and their daughter Justine worked at the Australian embassy in Washington, D.C.

Browne wrote his first three novels in the 1970s before taking a long hiatus. When he retired from banking in 1991, he wrote a historical fiction trilogy before turning to mysteries.

Browne died in Melbourne on 14 February 2014.

== Novels ==
Browne's novels include The Melbourne Trilogy series of historical novels (The Gilded Cage, The Burnt City, and The Trumpeting Angel), the Inspector Anders series of crime novels (The Wooden Leg of Inspector Anders, Inspector Anders and the Ship of Fools and Inspector Anders and the Blood Vendetta), and the Franz Schmidt series (Eye of the Abyss and The Iron Heart). The Wooden Leg of Inspector Anders (1999) was awarded the Ned Kelly prize for a first crime novel. It also made the shortlist of the Los Angeles Times Book Prize in 2002.

The author stated that he intended to write further works featuring Hideo Aoki, the Tokyo Metropolitan Police detective from Rendezvous at Kamakura Inn.

== Awards and nominations ==
- Glen Eira Literary Awards, 'My Brother Jack' Short Story Award, 1999: joint winner for Point of Departure, Point of Return
- Ned Kelly Awards for Crime Writing, Best First Novel Award, 2000: winner for The Wooden Leg of Inspector Anders
- The Los Angeles Times Book Prize, 2002: shortlisted for The Wooden Leg of Inspector Anders
- Ned Kelly Awards for Crime Writing, Best Novel, 2006: shortlisted for Rendezvous at Kamakura Inn

== Bibliography ==
=== The Melbourne Trilogy ===
- The Gilded Cage (1995)
- The Burnt City (1999)
- The Trumpeting Angel (2001)

=== Inspector Anders series ===
- The Wooden Leg of Inspector Anders (1999)
- Inspector Anders and the Ship of Fools (2001)
- Inspector Anders and the Blood Vendetta (2006)
- Inspector Anders and the Prague Dossier (2016) published after his death by his daughter

=== Franz Schmidt series ===
- The Eye of the Abyss (2002)
- The Iron Heart (2009)

=== Standalone Novels ===
- Dragon Strike (1981)
- City of Masks (1981)
- Dark Harbour (1984)
- Rendezvous at Kamakura Inn (2005)

=== Shorter works ===
- Point of Departure, Point of Return (2003) (short story collection)
- The Sabre and the Shawl (2014) (novella)
