= The Last Days (Masterson novel) =

Book by Andrew Masterson

The Last Days: The Apocryphon of Joe Panther
- Author: Andrew Masterson
- Language: English
- Genre: Novel
- Publisher: Picador, Australia
- Publication date: 1998
- Publication place: Australia
- Media type: Print Paperback
- Pages: 497 pp
- ISBN: 0-330-36059-0
- OCLC: 38831816
- Followed by: The Letter Girl

The Last Days: The Apocryphon of Joe Panther is a 1998 Ned Kelly Award-winning novel by the Australian author Andrew Masterson.

== Synopsis ==
Private investigator Joe Panther is engaged by Father Brendan Corrigan to help look into the death of a local girl, who has been found crucified above the altar of Corrigan's church. Added to that the girl's head has been placed in a separate box. But Joe isn't who he seems to be, or so he claims.

== Reviews ==
Writing for the Tabula Rasa website David Carroll noted: "Masterson manages to weave the theology together with a reasonably taut crime novel and bleed the conventions of each into one another. On the theology side, there is a dizzying array of historical anecdote, classical quotation and biblical reinterpretation, plus a bit of mysticism on the side, all arranged precisely. On the crime side there is increasing ripples of significance as the investigation into the murder starts taking on international ramifications, and perhaps beyond. The characters and writing style capture this perfectly, from the clergy to the cops and a diverse array of suspects, none of whom may be quite what they seem. It's all interwoven with clever detail, some excellent descriptions of Melbourne locales, pop- and occult- culture references, puns, genuine wit and wry asides that builds up to a scene of incredible farce."

== Awards ==
- Ned Kelly Awards for Crime Writing, Best First Novel Award, 1999: winner
