= Deadly, Unna? =

1998 young adult novel by Phillip Gwynne

- Author: Phillip Gwynne
- Language: English
- Genre: Young adult fiction
- Publisher: Penguin Books
- Publication date: 30 April 1998
- Publication place: Australia
- Media type: Paperback
- Pages: 288
- ISBN: 0141300493
- Followed by: 20018

Deadly, Unna? is a 1998 work of teenage fiction and is Phillip Gwynne's debut novel. Set in a small coastal town in South Australia, it is a rites-of-passage story about the interracial friendship between Australian rules football teammates Gary "Blacky" Black, a white boy, and Nunga Dumby Red. The novel is written from Blacky's point of view and covers the period leading up to the local football grand final and the summer after.

A film adaptation, Australian Rules, was released in 2002.

== Plot ==
The novel is set in a small town in South Australia, where the whites, or "Goonyas" live in "The Port", and the Nungas, the nigarooes/Aboriginal community, live in "The Point".

It is told very early in the text that the separate towns in which the whites and the Aboriginal peoples lived "didn't have too much to do with one another", which establishes the conflict that challenges Blacky and his sense of justice and loyalty throughout the text.

Blacky tells, in a colloquial manner, of the various personalities of the town and of his large family of three sisters and three brothers; heavy-drinking, hard-hitting father ("He only sat down to eat with us when the pub was closed"); and gentle, patient but exhausted mother. Blacky has a friend from the Point, Dumby, and a friend from the town, Pickles. Dumby is the best player in the team but this is not recognised, as is obvious on the grand final day.

As the novel opens, Blacky is worried about the imminent grand final and the responsibility he carries as the team’s new first ruck. His opponent will be the unstoppable "Thumper". To protect himself, Blacky has devised the ‘Thumper tackle’, which is the ultimate defence of the coward: it looks like he is trying to tackle his opponent but is really an elaborate dodge. For the majority of the game, Blacky keeps himself out of harm's way; however, near the end of the game, he inadvertently steps into the path of the Thumper, leaving him concussed yet causing sufficient impedance to the Thumper such that time expires before a scoring shot at goal could be registered, resulting in a win to Blacky's Port side.

During the team's after-party, however, the coach's son is given the honour of the Best On Ground award, which he believes should have been bestowed upon Dumby Red, the star player of the team. Soon after, the news reports that Dumby and his two brothers have been shot dead while robbing a public bar, resulting in the breakdown of Blacky's emotional life.

Blacky spends much of that winter dodging responsibility in a similar manner. By the end of the following summer, however, he understands the importance of making a stand and is able to do so. His brothers and sisters join him in his stand and the novel ends with Blacky at peace with himself, happy in his relationship with his siblings, and confident that he will be able to deal with the problems that will come with the morning.

Just before the grand final, Blacky meets Clarence, Dumby's younger sister. During the celebratory after-party, Clarence and Blacky have the starts of a racially forbidden romance, which is explored in the second book, Nukkin Ya.

Racism confronts Blacky and he is more and more aware that he thinks very differently from many of the townspeople. The turning point comes when Dumby is killed soon after presentation night while taking part in an armed holdup. Blacky attends Dumby's funeral and by doing so makes a stand.

== Film adaptation ==
The 2002 film Australian Rules is based on this novel, although not all of the parts are the same.

== Awards ==
- Children's Book of the Year Award: Older Readers (1999)
- Victorian Premier's Prize for Young Adult Fiction (1999)

== Themes ==
There are a number of key themes and issues in the novel Deadly Unna, including mateship, racism, sexism, injustice, masculinity, family, domestic violence, duty and self-sacrifice.

The website Lit Chart identifies the following themes: "Race, Injustice, and Action", "Courage and Masculinity", "Duty and Sacrifice", and "Teamwork and Family."

A key theme: The importance of family

Kinship was an important part of the culture of the First Australians (Australia's Indigenous peoples). Kinship refers to how individuals are related to one another and the roles and responsibilities of each family member. Social Structure is still important to Indigenous people who continue to have large, extended families. Many families have grandparents, aunts, uncles or cousins all living together in the same house. Living as one big, happy family means that there is always a lot of love and support.

In Deadly Unna, Dumby Red's family shares a close bond. His family members (Tommy and Clarry) come to support him at the football games. Dumby's father, Tommy, is proud of his children's athletic ability (Clarry is good at netball and Dumby is the forward for the local Australian rules football team). Dumby clearly values his extended family too. This is seen in the grand final when he passed the ball to his cousin Clemboy because he hadn't got a kick yet and he didn't want his cousin to feel shame. Here, he prioritised his cousin's feelings over the chances of winning the game. The Indigenous community's love of Dumby can be seen by how, after Dumby misses out on the Best on Ground award that he rightfully deserved, they boycott the Port and choose to drive further away to do their grocery shopping. It is also evident after Dumby's death. When Blacky sees Dumby's father at the cemetery, he notes that Tommy Red's vivacious personality is no more. This is evident in the quote, "I could see Tommy Red in the cemetery, next to Dumby's grave, his head bowed. Then he walked towards us. Slowly, like his legs were full of lead... It was hard to believe this was the same Tommy Red. Sometimes when we went catching crays, you'd see one but it'd be nothing but a shell. That's what Tommy reminded me of. Like his insides had gone" (Gwynne, 1998, p. 230).

However, the novel seems to imply that being part of a family or team does not always equal consistent support. This can be seen within the protagonist, Gary Black's, commentary about his own family. Blacky is one of eight children from a poor family with a loving but overworked mother and an alcoholic, abusive father. While both Blacky and Dumby have large families, the Black family is a stark contrast to the Red family. Blacky is disappointed in his family for not caring for each other as they should. His older brother Tim, who will do anything for his football coach or the team, does not usually sacrifice anything for his family. In the orientation of the novel, he is terrified of his father and often leaves Blacky hanging out to dry with the 'old man.' Bob Black is an absent father. Blacky notes he, "only sat down to eat with us when the pub was closed – Sundays and Christmas Day" (Gwynne, 1998, p 31). He drinks heavily and has a temper, which often causes him to lash out at his wife and children. In chapter 6, Blacky states that he hates the television show The Brady Bunch because it presents an ideal family in which the parents always solve their children’s problems. In Blacky’s experience, parents only create problems—a perspective informed by having an alcoholic father who physically and emotionally abuses him. The novel suggests that such relationships require effort and dedication from all members in order to be meaningful. This is evident by the ending when the protagonist, Blacky, learns to work together with his siblings to escape their abusive father and paint over the racist graffiti which hangs over his head for much of the novel.

Another theme: Mateship

Deadly, Unna? is sometimes described as a coming-of-age novel, as it shows how the central figure of Gary (a.k.a. Blacky) is changed by his interracial friendship with Dumby Red, an Indigenous Australian player on his local football team. As a fifteen-year-old boy, he is becoming more inquisitive about the world and reconsidering his place within it.

The novel presents a wonderful depiction of the lives of a motley crew of teenage boys from a town called the Port. He and his mates talk about sex, go fishing, fight with boys from other small-town footy teams, and go under the jetty for a smoke. At the beginning of the novel, local boy Pickles is Blacky’s best friend. Blacky remains loyal to him despite his crass nature and his questionable personal hygiene.

Their hometown (the Port) is a typical sleepy coastal town. In winter, the only action in town is the local football competition. It is during the tryouts that Blacky meets Dumby Red, a Nunga from the Aboriginal reserve up the coast, who will become another close mate. Initially Blacky is jealous of Dumby: of his athletic abilities, dress sense and perfect teeth. He also thinks Dumby’s a bit up himself — but Dumby just takes the world as it comes, with humour and good grace. Blacky and Dumby become friends when Dumby saves Blacky from certain injury at the hands of a brute from a rival footy team. Afterwards Blacky reflects, "It was just the excuse I needed. Now I could stop hating Dumby's guts. Thank God for that" (Gwynne, 1998, p 29).

Blacky is proud of his friend, whom he believes is the best player the Port team has ever had. He describes the mark Dumby makes in the grand final with awe and admiration: "Then everybody clapped... I knew why, too. They'd just seen the mark of their lives. They knew that no matter how many footy games they went to after that, how many replays they watched on the telly, .... They'd never see a better mark, a bigger speccy, than that one" (Gwynne, 1998, p107). Through their friendship, we as readers get to know a bit about the Nungas as Blacky does. We meet Dumby’s father, and his sister Clarence — they’re a cheerful, open-hearted mob, a contrast to Blacky’s own unruly family life. Blacky respects Dumby and (even though we aren't given a glimpse into Dumby's mind) it appears the feeling is mutual through Dumby's gestures and actions. For instance, in chapter 15 at the football awards night, he says 'Hey everybody, Blacky's here,' and then 'Didn't think you was coming... but I bagged you this chair just in case' (Gwynne, 1998, p 114).

Friendship is important to Blacky—his friends are a form of escapism from his dysfunctional home life. Sometimes, when things are bad with his dad, he hides out at Pickles' place and Pickles accepts this, no questions asked. It is interesting to note that even as the novel progresses and Blacky becomes wiser than Pickles, who remains racist and jealous of Blacky's newfound friendship with Dumby, Blacky never lectures him or cuts him out of his life.
