= Anxious Nation =

Book by David Walker

Anxious Nation: Australia and the Rise of Asia 1850-1939
- Author: David Walker
- Language: English
- Subject: Australian History
- Genre: Non-fiction
- Publisher: University of Queensland Press
- Publication date: 1999
- Publication place: Australia
- Media type: Print - paperback
- Pages: 312
- ISBN: 0-7022-3131-2
- OCLC: 305.895094

Anxious Nation: Australia and the Rise of Asia 1850–1939, written by David Walker, has been described as a "landmark" analysis of the history of Australian perceptions of Asian people and their cultures. It was first published by the University of Queensland Press in 1999 and has subsequently been reprinted in an Indian edition (SSS publishing, New Delhi, 2009) and translated into Chinese (China Renmin University Press, Beijing, 2009). Walker, who has been the professor of Australian Studies at Deakin University since 1991, is a leading authority in the field of Australian images of Asia and this work is the culmination of several years of his research and observation.

== Summary ==
Walker's premise is that Australian culture did not develop in isolation from Asia; Australians, while often considering themselves to be living in an outpost of Britain, have always had a fascination with the nations to their near north. Walker argues that many of the perceptions that Australians had of Asia were negative and that the Chinese, in particular, were feared because of the size of their population and the proximity of their homeland to Australia. Australians worried that their society would be overrun by the Chinese and contaminated by their supposed vices; exotic diseases, industrial “sweating”, gambling, sexual deviation and opium abuse. Japan was also feared because of its apparent imperial ambitions and the strength of its military forces. Walker illustrates these fears by analysing the neglected literary genre of invasion narratives. These novels, of which William Lane's White or Yellow? is characteristic, were popular in the 1890s and 1900s and described the enslavement of white Australians by invading Asian armies. Further images of the Chinese as a cunning but cruel race appeared in the Fu Manchu novels and films of the 1920s and 30s.

Walker argues that "Australia came to nationhood at a time when the growing power of the East was arousing increasing concern". Consequently, Anxious Nation places popular perceptions of Asia within the context of the political and cultural changes that led to the development of a distinctive Australian nationalism and the implementation of the White Australia policy. This inevitably leads to an analysis of Australian contributions to the philosophical and scientific theories, particularly Eugenics and Social Darwinism, that underlined concepts of race during the late nineteenth and early twentieth centuries. Within this setting a peculiarly Australian concern was whether white men could perform manual labour and prosper in the tropics. If they could not then the concept of a "White Australia" was doomed and the "Asianisation" of Australia was likely. Australian politicians and medical scientists spent significant time and resources in attempting to resolve this question.

Crucially Walker shows that Australians were fascinated by the people and cultures of Asia. He argues that, while negative perceptions of Asia were common, they were not universally held nor uncontested. The currency of the Japonisme and Chinoiserie aesthetic movements and the warm welcome given to a Japanese Naval Squadron in 1906 show that at least some Australians were willing to consider the positive aspects of Asian culture. In particular, Walker shows that Prime Minister Alfred Deakin had a comprehensive knowledge and interest in Indian religions and philosophies. Walker also argues that, despite the isolationism implied by the White Australia policy, Australia developed trade, cultural and diplomatic ties with the emerging Asian nations during the period studied.

== Awards and prizes ==
Anxious Nation was awarded the 2001 Ernest Scott Prize for History for the best history of Australia or New Zealand published in the preceding two years.

== Critical response ==
Anxious Nation received an extensive and positive critical response. Al Grassby, a former Minister for Immigration who dismantled the White Australia Policy, described the book as “evocative and compelling prose …which shows how bigotry and myth making shaped the question of race which dominated the public and private discourse.” David Carter in The Journal of Australian Studies believed that Anxious Nation had an important place in Australian historiography. He argued that it "shifts Australian perceptions of Asia from the margins to the centre of any concerns with the history -- the intellectual, cultural, political or diplomatic histories -- of the nation. In something of the same way that the complex of issues around `Aboriginal Australia' has moved over the last decade to the very centre of the field of Australian studies, Anxious Nation demonstrates why, over the next decade, Australia's relations with Asia, both the Asia within and the Asia without, will also be core business....It makes the biggest single contribution to date to this shift."

By October 2011 Anxious Nation had been cited in 131 scholarly articles.
