= Barry Maitland =

Australian author of crime fiction (born 1941)

- Born: 1941 (age 84–85); Paisley, Scotland
- Occupation: Novelist
- Years active: 1994-present
- Known for: Brock and Kolla series
- Notable work: The Malcontenta
- Awards: Ned Kelly Awards for Crime Writing

Barry Maitland (born 1941 in Scotland) is an Australian author of crime fiction. After studying architecture at Cambridge, Maitland practised and taught in the UK before moving to Australia, where he became a professor of architecture at the University of Newcastle. He retired in 2000 and took up writing full-time.

== Novels ==
=== Brock and Kolla ===
Maitland has written a series of crime novels known as the Brock and Kolla novels, focussing on Scotland Yard detectives, DCI David Brock and DS Katherine Kolla :

1. The Marx Sisters (1994)
2. The Malcontenta (1995)
3. All My Enemies (1996)
4. The Chalon Heads (1999)
5. Silvermeadow (2000)
6. Babel (2002)
7. The Verge Practice (2003)
8. No Trace (2004)
9. Spider Trap (2006)
10. Dark Mirror (2009)
11. Chelsea Mansions (2011)
12. The Raven's Eye (2013)
13. The Promised Land (2019)
14. The Russian Wife (2021)

=== Harry Belltree trilogy ===
In September, 2014 Maitland published the first of the Harry Belltree trilogy.

1. Crucifixion Creek: The Belltree Trilogy, Book One, ISBN 9781922182456, ASIN B00LZ1U6IY, Text (24 September 2014)
2. Ash Island (2015)
3. Slaughter Park (2016)

=== Others ===
- Bright Air (2008)

== Awards ==
- Ned Kelly Awards for Crime Writing, "Best Novel"
  - 1996, joint winner for The Malcontenta
  - 2000, shortlisted for Chalon Heads and Silvermeadow
  - 2003, shortlisted for Babel
  - 2005, shortlisted for No Trace
  - 2007, shortlisted for Spider Trap
  - 2009, shortlisted for Bright Air
