= Peter Doyle (writer) =

Australian author, musician, and visual artist (born 1951)

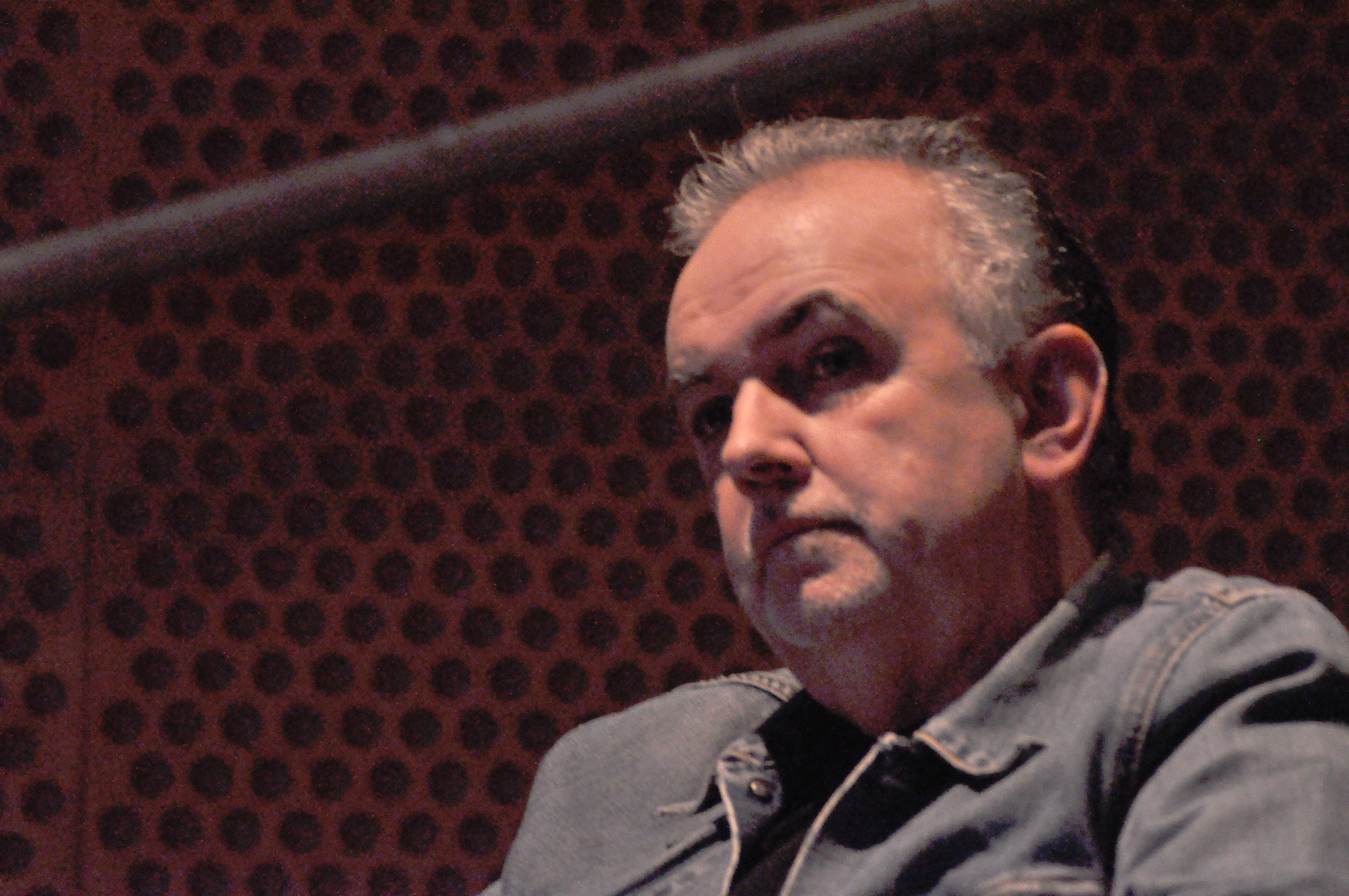
- Born: 1951 (age 74–75); Maroubra, Sydney, New South Wales, Australia
- Occupation: Novelist
- Writing career
- Genre: Detective fiction
- Notable work: City of Shadows
- Movements: Fiction, Non-fiction

Peter Doyle (born 1951) is an Australian author, musician, visual artist, and exhibition curator. He is an Honorary Associate Professor in the Department of Media, Communications, Creative Arts, Language and Literature at Macquarie University, and the recipient of a Lifetime Achievement Award from the Australian Crime Writers Association of Australia.

== Biography ==
Peter Doyle was born in Maroubra, Sydney, New South Wales, and grew up in Sydney's eastern suburbs, which provide much of the setting for his fiction work. He has a Bachelor of Arts (Communications) from UTS and a PhD in Media and Mass Communications on the renderings of virtual space in early popular music recording from Macquarie University (2002). He also maintains a research interest in comics and the graphic novel, the history of twentieth century popular music, as well as crime writing, both in Australia, and overseas.

He worked variously as a taxi driver, musician, and teacher prior to publishing his first novel, Get Rich Quick, in 1996, which won Australia's prestigious Ned Kelly Award for Best First Crime Novel in 1997. He followed this with a successful sequel, Amaze Your Friends, which won the Ned Kelly Award for Best Crime Novel in 1998. His third novel, The Devil's Jump, released in 2001, was a prequel, set in Sydney in the closing days of World War II. A fourth title, The Big Whatever (2015), follows the exploits of anti-hero Billy Glasheen into the 1970s and, like its predecessors, presents an alternative history of the overlaps between the entertainment business and crime.

Doyle's curatorial work at the Sydney Justice and Police Museum saw him curate two major exhibitions, Crimes of Passion (2002–2003), and City of Shadows: Inner City Crime and Mayhem, 1912-1948 (November 2005-February 2007), both of which were social histories of inner-city twentieth century Sydney based on rediscovered crime scene photography from the period. The book which accompanied the second exhibition, City of Shadows: Sydney Police Photographs 1912-1948 (2005) drew global attention to the huge but hitherto little explored Forensic Photography Archive (FPA) held at the Justice and Police Museum.

Further research into 1920s-era mug shots held at the Justice and Police Museum led to Doyle's book Crooks Like Us (2009) which would inform production and styling for the British television series, Peaky Blinders, as well as Bad Boys, a line of clothing by fashion designer Ralph Lauren (2011).

In 2013-14 Doyle curated the exhibition Suburban Noir at the Museum of Sydney, combining forensic photographs of the 1950s and 60s with original works by a range of local and overseas artists. In 2015 he curated the exhibition Pulp Confidential: Quick & Dirty Publishing from the 40s & 50s at the State Library of New South Wales, which showcased manuscripts, correspondence and artwork relating to Frank Johnson Publications, a Sydney-based pulp publisher from the 1940s and 1950s.

Peter Doyle is a noted slide and steel guitarist in the Sydney blues, rockabilly, country and pub rock scenes; his interest in music is also a strong influence in his fiction writing.

== Awards ==
- 2010 Ned Kelly Lifetime Achievement Award from the Australian Crime Writers Association.
- 2006 National Trust/Energy Australia Heritage Award, Interpretation and Presentation (for City of Shadows)
- 2006 Association of Recorded Sound Collections (ARSC) award for Best Research in Record Labels and General History.
- Winner, 1999 Ned Kelly Award Best Crime Novel for Amaze Your Friends
- Co-winner, 1997 Ned Kelly Award for Best First Crime Novel for Get Rich Quick

== Works ==
=== Novels ===
- Get Rich Quick. Melbourne: Minerva. 1996. ISBN 9781863305105. New edition: Portland, Oregon: Dark Passage/Verse Chorus Press. 2011. ISBN 9781891241246.
- Amaze Your Friends. Sydney: Random House. 1998. ISBN 9780091836566. New edition: Portland, Oregon: Dark Passage/Verse Chorus Press. 2019. ISBN 9781891241345.
- The Devil's Jump. Sydney: Arrow/Random House. 2001. ISBN 9780091841966. New edition: Portland, Oregon: Dark Passage/Verse Chorus Press. 2008. ISBN 9781891241208.
- The Big Whatever. Portland, Oregon: Dark Passage/Verse Chorus Press. 2015. ISBN 9781891241444.

=== Short fiction ===
- 'Cold War, Hot Dogs,' chapbook, with artwork by Rhett Brewer. 2011. rhettbrewer.com.au
- 'Good Bloke, in Sydney Noir. John Dale (Ed.) Brooklyn, NY: Akashic Books. 2019. ISBN 9781617755811.

=== Non-fiction ===
- City of Shadows: Sydney Police Photographs, 1912-1948. Sydney: Historic Houses Trust of NSW. 2005. ISBN 9780958121316.
- Echo and Reverb: Fabricating Space in Popular Music Recording, 1900-1960. Middletown, CT: Wesleyan University Press. 2005. ISBN 9780819567932.
- Crooks Like Us. Sydney: Historic Houses Trust of NSW. 2009. ISBN 9781876991340.
- Suburban Noir: Crime and Mishap in 1950s and 1960s Sydney. Sydney: NewSouth Publishing. 2022. ISBN 9781742239439.

=== Articles and essays ===
- ‘Passage: Peter Doyle on Life Behind the Wheel,’ Sydney Review of Books, 11 September 2022.
- ‘The Record That Listens to Itself,’ Maggot Brain, no. 6 (Sep. 2021), p. 40-45.
- ‘Reading the Police File: Interiority and the Forensic Artefact,’ Life Writing 17:4 (2020), p. 523-538.
- ‘The Last Boogie-Woogie,’ Sydney Review of Books, 23 Feb. 2020
- 'Writing Sound: Popular music in Australian Fiction,' Altitude, Issue 8, 2007.
- 'Signs and Wonders: Little Richard in Australia, 1957,' Meanjin, Vol.65, No.3, 2006.

Doyle has written feature articles, reviews and short pieces for The Bulletin, HQ and The Sydney Morning Herald. He has also been a columnist for Max and Sydney City Hub.

== Exhibitions ==
=== Art exhibition ===
- Suburban Noir. Rogue PopUp, November 2022.

=== Curated exhibitions ===
- 2004: Crimes of Passion. Justice and Police Museum, Sydney.
- 2005–2008, 2013–present: City of Shadows. Justice and Police Museum, Sydney
- 2013–2014: Suburban Noir. Museum of Sydney.

=== Audio-visual ===
- 2018 ‘Slasher Patrol: the Prowler Who Shook 1950s Sydney,’ The Guardian.
- 2013 'Suburban Noir,' Museums of History NSW.
