= James Bradley (Australian writer) =

Australian novelist and critic (born 1967)

James Bradley OAM
- Born: Adelaide, South Australia, Australia
- Education: University of Adelaide
- Occupations: Writer, critic
- Writing career
- Language: English
- Notable works: Wrack, The Resurrectionist
- Notable awards: Pascall Prize for Criticism; The Age Fiction Book of the Year Kathleen Mitchell Award
- Website: cityoftongues.com

James Bradley OAM is an Australian novelist and critic. His novels explore both past and future. In 2012, he won the Pascall Prize for Criticism and was named Australian Critic of the Year.

== Early life and education ==
James Bradley was born in Adelaide, South Australia.

He trained as a lawyer before becoming a writer.

== Career ==
Bradley's books include eight novels and a book of poetry. He has also edited two anthologies, Blur, a collection of writing by young Australian writers, and The Penguin Book of the Ocean. Bradley also writes as a critic, with reviews and articles appearing regularly in Australian newspapers and magazines, and blogs at City of Tongues.

Bradley's novels explore both past and future. The first, Wrack explores questions about the nature of history and the imaginary origins of Australia, drawing together the story of the semi-mythical "Mahogany Ship", a Portuguese caravel supposedly wrecked on the southern coast of Australia, love stories and a murder-mystery.

The second, The Deep Field, is set in a dystopic near-future and tells the story of a 'love affair' between a photographer and a blind palaeontologist. The third, The Resurrectionist, based loosely on the story of the Burke and Hare murders details the fall from grace of a young anatomist, Gabriel Swift. And the fourth, Clade, uses the story of three generations of a family to explore the possible effects of climate change over the 21st century.

Bradley's seventh novel, Ghost Species, was published on 27 April 2020.

=== Novels ===
- Wrack (1997) ISBN 0-09-183494-5
- The Deep Field (1999) ISBN 0-7336-1140-0
- The Resurrectionist (2006) ISBN 978-0-571-23276-5
- Clade (2015) ISBN 9781926428659
- The Silent Invasion (2017) ISBN 9781743549896
- The Buried Ark (2018) ISBN 9781743549902
- Ghost Species (2020) ISBN 9781926428666
- Landfall (2025) ISBN 978-1-76134-988-1

=== Non-Fiction ===
- Deep Water (2024) ISBN 9780143776956

=== Novellas ===
- Beauty's Sister (2013) ISBN 9780143569657

=== Poetry ===
- Paper Nautilus (1994) ISBN 1-875604-21-9

=== Editor ===
- Blur: Stories by Young Australian Writers (1996) ISBN 9780091832193
- The Penguin Book of the Ocean (2010) ISBN 978-1-926428-16-1

== Awards and recognition ==
Bradley's novels have won or been shortlisted for a number of major Australian literary awards, including The Age Fiction Book of the Year, the Miles Franklin Literary Award, the New South Wales Premier's Literary Awards, the Commonwealth Writers Prize for Best First Book (SE Asia and Pacific Region), the Courier-Mail Book of the Year Award, the Aurealis Best Novel Award (Science Fiction category), the Adelaide Festival's National Fiction Award, the Fellowship of the Australian Writers Literature Award, the Australian National Book Council's 'Banjo' Award and the Kathleen Mitchell Literary Award. He was also one of The Sydney Morning Herald's Best Young Australian Novelists in 1997 and 2000, and on 16 June 2008 The Resurrectionist was included as one of Richard & Judy's Summer Reads for 2008.

In 2012, Bradley won the Pascall Prize for Criticism and was named Australian Critic of the Year. He was awarded the Douglas Stewart Prize for Non-Fiction for Deep Water at the 2025 NSW Premier's Literary Awards. Deep Water was shortlisted for the 2025 Prime Minister's Literary Award for Nonfiction.

Bradley was awarded the Medal of the Order of Australia for "service to literature as a writer" in the 2021 Queen's Birthday Honours.

In 2026, he was joint winner of The Bragg UNSW Press Prize for Science Writing for his essay "An Oceanic Tempo".
