= Phillip Gwynne =

Australian author (born 1958)

- Born: 1958 (age 67–68); Melbourne, Victoria, Australia
- Occupation: Author
- Writing career
- Notable works: Deadly, Unna?, Nukkin Ya, Jetty Rats
- Notable awards: Children's Book of the Year (1998), Children's Peace Literature Award (1999)

Phillip Gwynne (born 1958) is an Australian author. He is best known for his 1998 debut novel, Deadly, Unna?, a rites-of-passage story which uses Australian rules football as a backdrop to explore race relations in a small town in South Australia. The novel won several awards, selling over 200,000 copies, and was adapted into a 2002 film titled Australian Rules. Gwynne has written numerous other books, including children's and young adult books as well as screenplays for television and movies.

== Life ==
Gwynne was born in Melbourne, Victoria, and grew up in rural areas in Victoria and South Australia. He graduated from James Cook University with a degree in marine biology. He also pursued a career as a computer programmer. He came to professional writing later in life and wrote his first novel at the age of 35. His award-winning novel Deadly, Unna? won Children's Book of the Year in 1998 and was made into a feature film Australian Rules in 2002. Deadly, Unna? also won him the 1999 Children's Peace Literature Award.

== Works ==
Young adult

- Deadly, Unna? (1998)
- Nukkin Ya (2000)
- Jetty Rats (2004)
- Swerve (2009)
- The Debt book 1: Catch the Zolt (2013)
- The Debt book 2: Turn off the Lights (2013)
- The Debt book 3: Bring Back Cerberus (2013)
- The Debt book 4: Fetch the Treasure Hunter (2013)
- The Debt book 5: Yamashita's Gold (2013)
- The Debt book 6: Take a Life (2013)

Children's books

- The Worst Team Ever (1999)
- Born to Bake (2005)
- A Chook Called Harry (2009)
- Escape from Kids' Club (2010)
- Ruby Learns to Swim (2012)
- The Queen with the Wobbly Bottom (2012)
- Yobbos Do Yoga (2013)
- What's Wrong with the Wobbegong? (2014)
- Michael (2014)
- Little Owl (2014)
- Small Town (2020)
