= Get Rich Quick (novel) =

1996 novel by Peter Doyle

- Author: Peter Doyle
- Language: English
- Genre: Crime novel
- Publisher: Mandarin Publishing, Melbourne
- Publication date: 1996
- Publication place: Australia
- Media type: Print Paperback
- Pages: 280pp
- ISBN: 1-86330-510-6 (first edition, paperback)
- OCLC: 38385440

Get Rich Quick is a 1996 Ned Kelly Award-winning novel by the Australian author Peter Doyle.

== Awards ==
- Ned Kelly Awards for Crime Writing, Best First Novel, 1997: joint winner

== Reviews ==
- "Australian Crime Fiction database"
