= Andrew Masterson =

Australian writer

- Born: 1961 (age 64–65); United Kingdom
- Occupation: Novelist
- Writing career
- Period: 1995–
- Notable work: The Last Days: the Apocryphon of Joe Panther
- Notable awards: Ned Kelly Awards for Crime Writing

Andrew Masterson (born 1961 in the United Kingdom) is an Australian author of crime fiction, horror and non-fiction. Masterson emigrated from the UK to Australia in 1968. He has worked as a journalist since 1984 in a number of countries, including Australia, the UK, Germany and the United States. He has a teenager named Cato, and a wife named Sahm.

== Awards ==
- Ned Kelly Awards for Crime Writing, Best first crime novel, 1999: winner for The Last Days : the apocryphon of Joe Panther
- Aurealis Awards for Excellence in Australian Speculative Fiction, Science Fiction Division, Best Novel, 1999: shortlisted for The Letter Girl
- Ned Kelly Awards Awards for Crime Writing, Best Crime Novel, 2001: joint winner for The Second Coming : the passion of Joe Panther

== Bibliography ==
=== Novels ===
- The Last Days: the Apocryphon of Joe Panther (1998)
- The Letter Girl (1999)
- The Second Coming: the Passion of Joe Panther (2000)
- Death of the Author (2001)

=== Non-fiction ===
- Pop, Print & Publicity (1997)
- Bosstrology: a guide to the twelve bastard bosses of the Zodiac (1997) with Adele Lang
- Rocking in the Real World: an introduction to the music industry in Australia (1998) with Sue Gillard
- Alcorobics: fitness and harmony through drinking (2003)
