= Australian Studies Centre (Renmin University of China) =

Australian Studies Centre is a teaching and research institution of Renmin University of China. The Centre was officially established on 19 November 1999. The aim of the Centre is to help more people know more about Australia.

ASC at RUC held Australian Culture Weeks from 2000 through 2005. The Australian Culture Week has become an annual event at Renmin University of China. The activities of the Australian Culture Weeks are popular among the students and teaching staff and other universities in Beijing. The activities held during the Australian Culture Week at RUC have received wide media coverage and have begun to show its impact on other walks of life in the community. Australian Culture Week proves to be a good opportunity to promote person-to-person communication between Australian and Chinese peoples.

The Centre at RUC has also established links with various universities in Australia. Well-known scholars such as Prof. Colin Mackerras, Prof. David Walker, Dr Jamie Greenbaum, and other Australian friends have all made great contribution to the Centre. Up to now, nineteen master's degree students have graduated from the Centre, and four other students are doing their master's degrees at the Centre.
