= American Association for Australian Literary Studies =

The American Association for Australasian Literary Studies (AAALS) is an organization of scholars in North America that studies and promotes research in the literature of Australia and New Zealand. Its activities are partially funded by the Literature Fund of the Australia Council for the Arts. It publishes the journal Antipodes, A Global Journal of Australian/NZ Literature and holds an annual conference, rotated between locations in the United States and Canada. AAALS conferences have been held at Harvard University in 2005; at McGill University in 2006; at Georgetown University in 2007, at the University of Texas in 2008; in Washington, DC in 2010, Fort Worth, TX in 2011, Toronto 2012, Washington DC (2013), Portland, OR (2014), Texas Christian University in Fort Worth, TX (2015), Seattle, WA (2016), Orangeburg, SC (2017), New York City (2018), Fairbanks, AK (2019), Chicago, IL (2022), Phoenix, AZ (2023). A virtual conference was held in 2021 due to the pandemic. The current President is Brenda Machosky of University of Hawai`i West O’ahu; Barbara M. Hoffmann of the University of Miami serves as Vice-President; Per Henningsgaard of Curtin University is Treasurer; Ann-Marie Blanchard is secretary.

The organization was founded in 1986 by Robert L. Ross (1934-2005) and has since then assumed an increasing international profile. Featured guest speakers have included Peter Carey, David Malouf, Lily Brett, John Tranter, Frank Moorhouse, Thomas Keneally, Alan Wearne, Mudrooroo, Kate Grenville, Lyn McCredden, David Carter, Janette Turner Hospital and John Kinsella. In 1996 the AAALS became an Allied Organization of the Modern Language Association, at which it holds sessions annually.

The official scholarly journal of the AAALS is entitled Antipodes. Antipodes appears twice a year, each issue containing ten or so academic articles, plus poems, short stories, and book reviews. The journal always features a cover image by an Australian or New Zealand artist. The journal was founded in 1987 by Robert L. Ross and edited by Nicholas Birns from 2001 to 2018; Brenda Machosky currently serves as the Editor. Antipodes is published by Wayne State University Press. Recent special issue topics have been: Australia and Asia, Australia and Latin America, pedagogy and Australian/NZ literature, and the theme of fear in Australian literature.
