= Susan Betts =

Australian artist and cultural adviser

Susan 'Susie' Betts
- Agent: She was a Judge in the 2024 South Australian Literary Awards in the Children's Literature Award section.
- Known for: First Nations artist and cultural advisor
- Notable work: Warna-Manda Baby Earth Walk (2021) by Susan Betts and Mandy Foot, Lullabies for Bed Time (2017) by Susan Betts
- Awards: The Gladys Elphick awards - Quiet Achiever award in 2016. Churchill Trust Fellowship in 2018

Susan 'Susie' Betts is an Australian First Nations artist, illustrator and cultural advisor. She has ancestral connections to Wirangu, Kokata and Mirning country, community and language groups on the far West coast of South Australia.

== Career ==
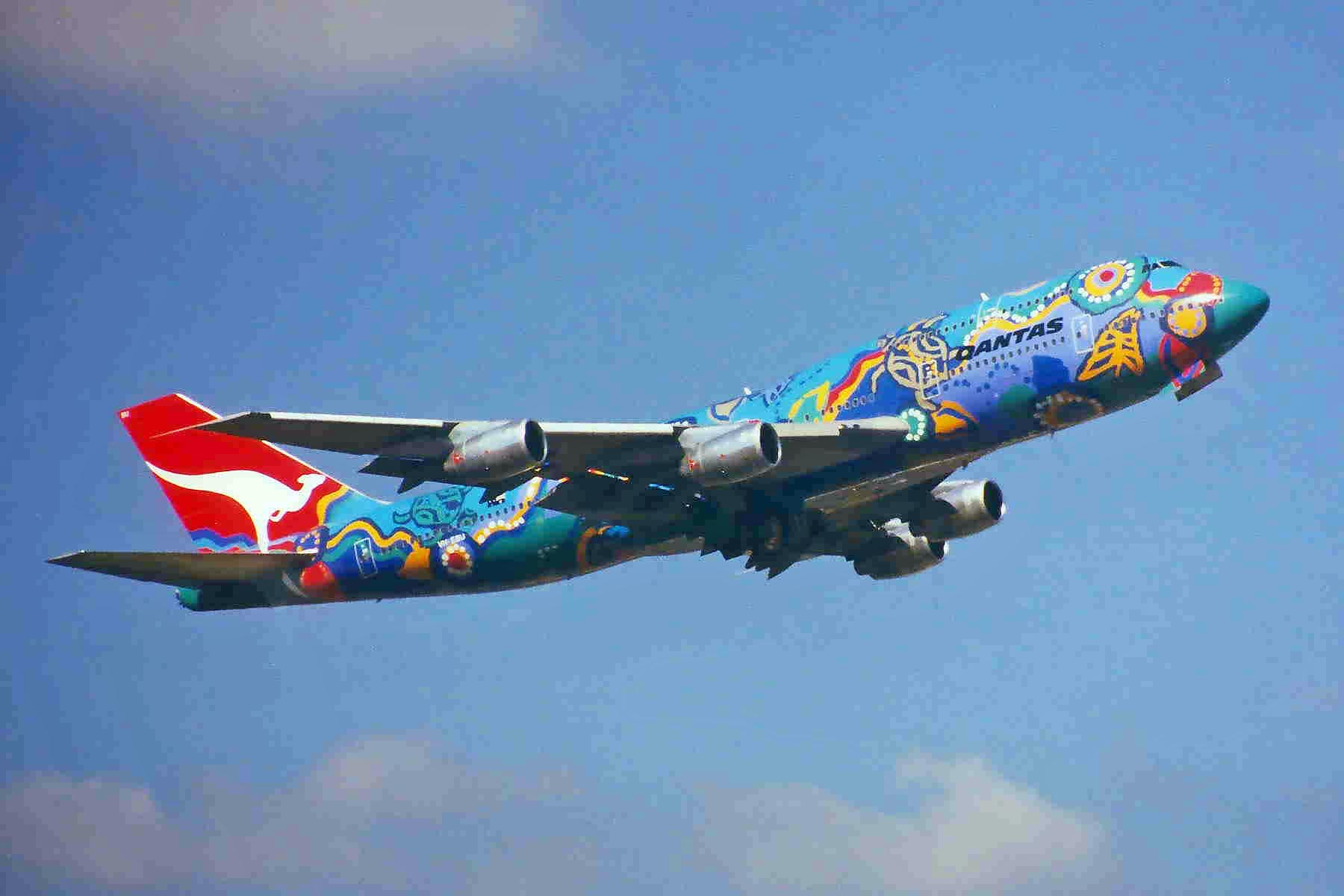
Qantas jet covered in Nalanji Dreaming artwork by Susan Betts and Balarinji Design Studio.

Betts' artworks created whilst employed at Balarinji Design Studio include the Nalanji Dreaming design covering a Qantas jet in 1995. She developed the Sweet Water design for an oversized Coca-Cola bottle displayed at the 1996 Olympics and now in Atlanta Museum.

She designed a cultural football guernsey for the Adelaide Crows worn during 2016 for the Australian Rules Football Indigenous round at the request of her nephew Eddie Betts.

Betts has undertaken international research through a Churchill Fellowship in 2018 exploring the Seven Sisters (Pleiades) constellation and creation stories (Tjukurpa) across Indigenous cultures in Australia and overseas. As a part of this fellowship she was able to visit the Elliston and Streaky Bay areas which had been taboo to her people for many years; this was possible after a ceremony acknowledging the Waterloo Bay massacre and what had been lost.

Betts said of this:

We want to make this connection back on country because for thousands of years our people have been coming here, our ancestors and doing ceremony.

— Susan Betts, 8 October 2020, ABC Eyre Peninsula

As of 2024, Betts is a Board member of Country Arts SA and part of their First Nations Advisory Committee. She was also a Judge in the 2024 South Australian Literary Awards in the Children's Literature Award section.

== Selected works ==
Children's books

- Warna-Manda Baby Earth Walk (2021) by Susan Betts and Mandy Foot
- Lullabies for Bed Time (2017) by Susan Betts, Phil Cummings, Mike Dumbleton, Katrina Germein and Louise Pike
- It's Bed Time (2009) by Katrina Germein, Phil Cummings, Susan Betts and Tania Cox

== Awards ==
- The Gladys Elphick awards - Quiet Achiever award in 2016.
- Churchill Trust Fellowship in 2018.
- Shortlisted in 2022 for The Wilderness Society Karajia Award for Children’s Literature for her picture book Warna-Manda Baby Earth Walk, written and illustrated by Susan Betts with co-illustrator Mandy Foot.
