= Benjamin Martin =

Benjamin Martin may refer to:

- Benjamin Martin (lexicographer) (1704–1782), English lexicographer and scientific instrument maker
- Benjamin F. Martin (1828–1895), politician, lawyer and teacher from Virginia and West Virginia
- Benjamin Brown Martin (1883–1932), American artist
- Benjamin Charles Stanley Martin (1891–1957), Royal Navy admiral
- Benjamin Martin (chess player) (born 1969), New Zealand chess master
- Benjamin Martin (author) (born 1984), author of the Samurai Awakening book series
- Benjamin Martin (field hockey) (born 1987), Canadian field hockey player
- Benjamin Martin (1732–1801), protagonist of the 2000 film The Patriot

== See also ==
- Ben Martin (disambiguation)
- Benny Martin (1928–2001), bluegrass musician
- Benjamin Marten (1690s–1752), physician
