= The Stamp Collector =

Picture book by Jennifer Lanthier and François Thisdale

- Cover Illustration by François Thisdale
- Author: Jennifer Lanthier
- Illustrator: François Thisdale
- Language: English
- Genre: children's fiction
- Publisher: Fitzhenry & Whiteside
- Publication date: 2012
- Publication place: Canada
- Media type: Print (Hardcover)
- Pages: 32
- ISBN: 978-1-55455-218-4 (first edition, hardcover)

The Stamp Collector is a children's picture book (recommended for ages 8 and up) by Jennifer Lanthier and François Thisdale. It was published in 2012 by Fitzhenry & Whiteside. A French language edition, Le Collectionneur de Timbres, was released in October, 2013. The theme of the book is freedom of expression.

== Plot ==
A city boy finds a discarded postage stamp that unlocks his imagination; a country boy is captivated by stories. When they grow up, the two boys take different paths—one becomes a prison guard, the other works in a factory—but their early childhood passions remain. Their lives intersect years later when the country boy's stories of hope land him in prison, guarded by the city boy.

The rules prohibit the guard and writer from talking. As the years pass, the writer's story spreads around the world and letters of support from faraway places begin to arrive. The guard is fascinated by the beautiful stamps and intrigued by what they suggest about the prisoner he watches. With time, the guard feels compelled to deliver first the stamps and eventually the letters, as evidence to the writer that the world has not forgotten him.

A unique friendship begins. The writer grows ever weaker while the guard begs him to tell him his stories and promises to share them. After the writer's death the guard courageously leaves his post and journeys to a distant but safe library where he puts pen to paper and begins to share the stories.

Although the setting of The Stamp Collector is unnamed, the postmarks and Chinese characters used in the illustrations suggest a thinly-disguised China.

== Freedom of expression activism ==
An afterword in the book explains the concept of freedom of expression and the work done by International PEN and other charities on behalf of writers and journalists imprisoned or at risk. It is also disclosed that a portion of all proceeds from its sales “will support PEN Canada in its efforts to bring hope to writers in prisons around the world.” PEN Canada is the Canadian arm of International PEN.

Lanthier says the story was inspired by the writer Nuremuhamet Yasin, who was sentenced to ten years in a Chinese prison in 2004 for writing a short story called “The Wild Pigeon.” Lanthier advocated for his release while volunteering for PEN Canada. At a meeting of PEN advocates, Lanthier met the exiled journalist Jiang Weiping, who had spent six years in a Chinese prison for a series of investigative articles he wrote exposing the corruption of the government official, Bo Xilai. Lanthier says that encounter led her to write The Stamp Collector. In the afterword Lanthier explains “We asked Mr. Weiping if there was any point in writing letters to prisoners who weren’t allowed to see them. He said yes – because the guards collect stamps.”

In June 2013 The Stamp Collector won the Huguenot Society of Canada Award, presented by the Ontario Historical Society, honouring the book for bringing “public awareness to the principles of freedom of conscience and freedom of thought.”

== Illustrations ==
Thisdale's illustrations blended traditional drawing and painting with digital imagery. Chinese landscapes were creatively blended with vistas, creating a combination of realism and imagination. Layered into each image are Chinese characters, bright stamps and ghostly postmarks.

One image, that of the discarded stamp found by the city boy in the opening pages and saved for its beauty, recurs throughout the book and serves as the metaphor carrying the book's political message. Thisdale based the image on this particular stamp on The Temple of the Sun in Chaoyang District, Beijing, China. During the 2008 Summer Olympics, at the behest of the IOC, The Temple of the Sun was one of three locations designated by Chinese officials as official protest zones. All applications to protest there were denied or withdrawn and no protests took place. At least two persons who applied to protest were arrested and sentenced to reeducation.

== Awards and honours ==
- Winner - 2014 Golden Oak Award, OLA Forest of Reading, Ontario Library Association
- IBBY Honour List 2014 for The Stamp Collector, International Board on Books for Young People (IBBY)
- Winner - 2014 Great Books Award, Canadian Toy Testing Council (CTTC),
- Finalist - 2013 TD Canadian Children's Literature Award, Canadian Children's Book Centre (CCBC)
- Finalist - 2013 Marilyn Baillie Picture Book Award, Canadian Children's Book Centre (CCBC)
- Winner - Huguenot Society of Canada Award, Ontario Historical Society
- Finalist - 2013 Libris Award – Young Readers' Book of the Year, Canadian Booksellers Association (CBA)
- Winner - 2013 Crystal Kite Award, Society of Children's Book Writers and Illustrators (SCBWI) - Americas Division
- Ezra Jack Keats 2013 New Writer Honor [Jennifer Lanthier], Ezra Jack Keats Foundation
- Finalist - 2013 Amelia Frances Howard-Gibbon Illustrator's Award [François Thisdale], Canadian Library Association
- Nominee - 2014 Silver Birch Express Award, OLA Forest of Reading, Ontario Library Association
- Notable Books for a Global Society Award 2013, International Reading Association (IRA) - Children's Literature and Reading Special Interest Group
- Best Bets 2012, Ontario Library Association - Canadian Materials Committee
- USBBY 2013 Outstanding International Books, United States Board on Books for Young People (U.S. National Section of International Board on Books for Young People)
- Heather's Kids Pick, Indigo Books and Music

== Critical reviews ==
- BookDragon(Smithsonian Institution, Smithsonian Asian Pacific American Center)]
- Quill & Quire Magazine
- Reading Today (International Reading Association (now International Literacy Association))
- Perfect Nostalgia (Blog)
- Reading Matters (Blog)
- CanLit for Little Canadians (Blog)
- CM Magazine (Canadian Review of Materials)
- Bookish Notions (Blog)
- Bookpage
- Albany Times Union
- The Record (Kitchener-Waterloo)
- Teach Magazine
