= Mandy Foot =

Australian children's writer and illustrator

- Occupation: Illustrator, graphic designer, artist
- Genre: Children's picture books
- Subjects: Australian wildlife, anthropomorphic animals, rural settings
- Years active: 2000s–present
- Notable works: Bev & Kev; The Last Dragon; Hush Say the Stars; Warna-Manda Baby: Earth Walk
- Notable awards: SCBWI Crystal Kite Award (2023); Karajia Award – Wilderness Society Environment Award for Children's Literature

Mandy Foot is a South Australian based illustrator of children's picture books, graphic design and artwork. She has won a number of awards including a Crystal Kite Award from the Society of Children's Book Writers and Illustrators (SCBWI) and a Karajia Award, the Wilderness Society's Environment Award for Children's Literature.

== Career ==
Foot commenced her illustration career working at the Adelaide Zoo Education Service where she worked for over 15 years. She has illustrated over 25 books specifically for young children under the age of seven. Most of her work focusses on Australian themes, particularly anthropomorphic animals and birds in rural settings.

== Awards ==
- 2019 Speech Pathology Australia Book of the Year Awards, shortlisted Birth to Three Years for Hush Say The Stars (by Margaret Spurling)
- 2021 ACT Notable Book Awards 2021 winner The Last Dragon
- 2022 The Wilderness Society Environment Award for Children's Literature shortlisted Warna-Manda Baby: Earth Walk
- 2023 SCBWI Crystal Kite Award for Bev & Kev
- 2023 Children's Book of the Year Awards: Early Childhood Honour book - Bev & Kev

== Works ==
- The Wheels on the Bus (2010) illustrated by Mandy Foot
- Old MacDonald Had a Farm (2010) illustrated by Mandy Foot
- Come Fly with Captain Kangaroo (2011) illustrated by Mandy Foot
- Little Roo went to Market (2015) illustrated by Mandy Foot
- Hush Say the Stars (2018) written by Margaret Spurling and illustrated by Mandy Foot
- Hip Hop Barn (2019) written by Phil Cummings and illustrated by Mandy Foot
- Joey and Riley (2019) written and illustrated by Mandy Foot
- The Last Dragon (2021) written by Dr Charles Massy and illustrated by Mandy Foot
- Warna-Manda Baby: Earth Walk (2021) written by Susan Betts and illustrated by Mandy Foot
- Let the Singing Begin (2022) written by Mike Dumbleton and Linda Dumbleton and illustrated by Mandy Foot
- Bev & Kev (2022), written by Katrina Germein and illustrated by Mandy Foot
