= Crystal Kite Award =

Literary award

The Crystal Kite Award (also known as 'Crystal Kite Members Choice Award) is given by the Society of Children's Book Writers and Illustrators (SCBWI) each year to recognize great books from the 70 SCBWI regions around the world. Along with the SCBWI Golden Kite Awards, the Crystal Kite Awards are chosen by other children's book writers and illustrators, making them the only peer-given awards in publishing for young readers.

Each SCBWI member votes for their favorite book from a nominated author in their region that was published in the previous calendar year.

== Winners ==
=== International Regions ===
==== Australia / New Zealand ====
Year	Title	Author
2011	There Was an Old Sailor	Claire M. Saxby
2012	The Last Viking	Norman Jorgensen and James Foley
2013	Ten Tiny Things	Meg McKinlay and Kyle Hughes-Odgers
2014	Zac and Mia	AJ Betts
2015	Hello From Nowhere	Raewyn Caisley and Karen Blair
2016	A is for Australia	Frané Lessac
2017	Smile Cry	Tania McCartney and Jess Racklyeft
2018	The Scared Book	Debra Tidball
2019	At The End of Holyrood Lane	Dimity Powell
2020	Catch a Falling Star	Meg McKinlay
2021	How to Make a Bird	Meg McKinlay
2022	Heroes of the Secret Underground	Susanne Gervay
2023	Bev and Kev	Katrina Germein and Mandy Foot
2024	Hanukkah Upside Down	Elissa Weissman (Omer Hoffmann, illustrator)
2025	Happy All Over	Emma Quay
2026	Grandmother from the East, Grandmother from the West	Jacinta Liu and Fredia Chiu

==== Canada ====
Year	Title	Author
2011	Stolen Child	Marsha Skrypuch
2012	Witchlanders	Lena Coakley
2013	The Stamp Collector	Jennifer Lanthier
2014	I Dare You Not to Yawn	Helene Boudreau
2015	Bog	Karen Krossing
2016	A Brush Full of Colour	Margriet Ruurs
2017	Dot to Dot in the Sky, Stories of the Aurora	Joan Marie Galat
2018	My Beautiful Birds	Suzanne Del Rizzo
2019	The Outlaw	Nancy Vo
2020	Small World	Ishta Mercurio-Wentworth
2021	Night Walk	Ellie Arscott & Sara O'Leary
2022	Tough Like Mum	Lana Button
2023	One Tiny Bubble	Karen Krossing and Dawn Lo
2024	Deep, Deep Down: The Secret Underwater Poetry of the Mariana Trench	Lydia Lukidis and Juan Calle
2025	Up, Up, Ever Up! Junko Tabei: A Life in the Mountains	Anita Yasuda and Yuko Shimizu (illustrator)
2026	The Dog Who Saved the Bees	Stephanie Gibeault and David Hohn

==== Europe / Latin America / Africa ====
Year	Title	Author
2011	A Kite's Flight	Maja Sereda
2012	Finding Aunt Joan	Jenny Hatton and Joan Rankin
2013	The Magyar Conspiracy	Neil Malherbe
2014	Chick-o-Sarus Rex	Lenore Appelhans
2015	A Dance Like Starlight: One Ballerina’s Dream	Kristy Dempsey
2016	The Safest Lie	Angela Cerrito
2017	El Jardín Mágico	Lemniscates
2018	Will You Read My Book with Me?	Lawrence Schimel
2019	The Night Lion	Sanne Dufft
2020	The Untold, Bloody, and Absolutely Real History of Switzerland	Laurie Theurer
2021	The Hungry Ghost	Helle Sidelmann Norup
2022	The Stuff Between the Stars	Sandra Nickel
2023	Baily and Blanket	Emily House
2024	Lucky Me!	Lawrence Schimel and Juan Camilo Mayorga
2025	Bear's Big Idea	Sandra Nickel and Il Sung Na
2026	Seven, A Most Remarkable Pigeon	Sandra Nickel and Aimee Sicuro

==== Middle East / India / Asia ====
Year	Title	Author
2011	Saraswati's Way	Monika Schröder
2012	Orchards	Holly Thompson
2013	Samurai Awakening	Benjamin Martin
2014	Bonkers!	Natasha Sharma
2015	Petu Pumpkin: Tooth Troubles	Arundhati Venkatesh
2016	The Adventures of Squirky the Alien #3: Who is the Red Commander?	Melanie Lee
2017	Somewhere Among	Annie Donwerth-Chikamatsu
2018	Yossi and the Monkeys	Jennifer MacLeod
2019	The Clever Tailor	Srividhya Venkat
2020	Indigo Girl	Suzanne Kamata
2021	The Last Garden	Rachel Ip
2022	Temple Alley Summer	Sachiko Kashiwaba
2023	Shoham's Bangle	Sarah Sassoon and Noa Kelner
2024	The Light Within You	Namita Moolani Mehra and Kamala Nair
2025	Listening to Trees	Holly Thompson and Toshiki Nakamura
2026	Under Pressure: Freddie Mercury's Countdown to Fame	Shyamala Shanmugasundaram and Pankaj Saikia

==== UK / Ireland ====
Year	Title	Author
2011	Tall Story	Candy Gourlay
2012	Dark Parties	Sara Grant
2013	Fifteen Days Without a Head	Dave Cousins
2014	Shine	Candy Gourlay
2015	The Year of the Rat	Claire Furniss
2016	Mind Games	Teri Terry
2017	More of Me	Kathryn Evans
2018	Mold and the Poison Plot	Lorraine Gregory
2019	Orphan Monster Spy	Matt Killeen
2020	The Tide	Clare Welsh
2021	Boy, Everywhere	A. M. Dassu
2022	The Bear and her Book	Frances Tosdevin
2023	Call Me Lion	Camilla Chester and Irina Avgustinovich
2024	Windows to the World	Alice Bianchi-Clark and Chloe Chang
2025	East Asian Folktales, Myths and Legends	Eva Wong Nava
2026	Street Puppy, Masjid Cat	Moniza Hossain and Wastana Haikal

=== Regions in the United States ===
==== Atlantic (Pennsylvania / Delaware / New Jersey / Wash DC / Virginia / West Virginia / Maryland) ====
Year	Title	Author
2011	Mockingbird	Kathryn D. Erskine
2012	The Absolute Value of Mike	Kathryn D. Erskine
2013	BOY + BOT	Ame Dyckman
2014	Flame in the Mist	Kit Grindstaff
2015	Pandemic	Yvonne Ventresca
2016	Ada Byron Lovelace and the Thinking Machine	Laurie Wallmark
2017	I Dissent: Ruth Bader Ginsburg Makes Her Mark	Debbie Levy
2018	7 Ate 9: The Untold Story	Tara Lazar
2019	Hawk Rising	Maria Gianferrari
2020	Hedy Lamarr's Double Life: Hollywood Legend and Brilliant Inventor	Laurie Wallmark
2021	Evelyn Del Rey Is Moving Away	Meg Medina
2022	A Place to Hang the Moon	Kate Albus
2023	Mushroom Rain	Laura K. Zimmerman and Jamie Green
2024	Woven of the World	Katey Howes and Dinara Mirtalipova
2025	Tricky Chopsticks	Sylvia Chen and Fanny Liem
2026	Sparkles for Sunny: A Lunar New Year Story	Sylvia Chen and Thai My Phuong

==== California / Hawaii ====
Year	Title	Author
2011	The Quiet Book	Deborah Underwood
2012	Won Ton - A Cat Tale Told in Haiku	Lee Wardlaw
2013	The One and Only Ivan	Katherine Applegate
2014	The Kite That Bridged Two Nations	Alexis O'Neill
2015	Bombs Over Bikini: The World’s First Nuclear Disaster	Connie Goldsmith
2016	Under a Painted Sky	Stacey Lee
2017	Antsy Ansel: Ansel Adams, a Life in Nature	Cindy Jenson-Elliott and Christy Hale
2018	The Lost Boys	Darcey Rosenblatt
2019	She Made a Monster: How Mary Shelley Created Frankenstein	Lynn Fulton
2020	The Downstairs Girl	Stacey Heather Lee
2021	Efrén Divided	Ernesto Cisneros
2022	Hello, Star	Stephanie Lucianovic
2023	Leo + Lea	Monica Wesolowska and Kenard Pak
2024	A River of Dust: The Life-Giving Link Between North Africa and The Amazon	Jilanne Hoffmann and Eugenia Mello
2025	The Man Who Didn't Like Animals	Deborah Underwood and LeUyen Pham
2026	I AM NOT HAPPY!	Caroline Perry and Sydney Hanson

==== Mid-South (Kansas / Louisiana / Arkansas / Tennessee / Kentucky / Missouri) ====
Year	Title	Author
2011	Selling Hope	Kristin O'Donnell Tubb
2012	Between Shades of Gray	Ruta Sepetys
2013	The Dark Unwinding	Sharon Cameron
2014	The 13th Sign	Kristin O'Donnell Tubb
2015	Faking Normal	Courtney Stevens
2016	Top Secret Files of History – WWII	Stephanie Bearce
2017	Salt to the Sea	Ruta Sepetys
2018	A Dog Like Daisy	Kristin O'Donnell Tubb
2019	A Hippy-Hoppy Toad	Peggy Archer
2020	Poetree	Shauna LaVoy Reynolds
2021	The Oldest Student: How Mary Walker Learned to Read	Rita Lorraine Hubbard
2022	I'll Meet You in Your Dreams	Jessica Young
2023	Big and Small and In-Between	Carter Higgins and Daniel Miyares
2024	Creep, Leap, Crunch! A Food Chain Story	Jody Jensen Shaffer and Christopher Silas Neal
2025	The Last Day Julian was My Best Friend	Jody Jensen Shaffer and Joanne Lew-Vriethoff
2026	You Can Sit With Me	Rachel Tawil Kenyon and Tatiana Kasmshilina

==== Mid-West (Minnesota / Iowa / Nebraska / Wisconsin / Illinois / Michigan / Indiana / Ohio) ====
Year	Title	Author
2011	Janis Joplin: Rise Up Singing	Ann M. Angel
2012	Bluefish	Pat Schmatz
2013	Creepy Carrots	Aaron Reynolds
2014	Sophie's Squash	Pat Zietlow Miller
2015	I am Cow, Hear Me Moo	Jill Esbaum
2016	Wherever You Go	Pat Zietlow Miller
2017	The Quickest Kid in Clarksville	Pat Zietlow Miller
2018	Blue Sky White Stars	Sarvinder Naberhaus
2019	The Rabbit Listened	Cori Doerrfeld
2020	Just Like Rube Goldberg	Sarah Aronson
2021	Old Rock (is not boring!)	Deb Pilutti
2022	Headstrong Hallie! The Story of Hallie Morse Daggett, the First Female "Fire Guard"	Aimee Bissonette
2023	Bathe the Cat	Alice B. McGinty and David Roberts
2024	Willow and Bunny	Anitra Schulte and Christopher Denise
2025	A Little Like Magic	Sarah Kurpiel
2026	STUCK! The Story of La Brea Tar Pits	Joyce P. Uglow and Valerya Milovanova

==== New England (Maine / Vermont / New Hampshire / Connecticut / Massachusetts / Rhode Island) ====
Year	Title	Author
2011	Bats at the Ball Game	Brian Lies
2012	Pearl	Jo Knowles
2013	See You at Harry's	Jo Knowles
2014	The Story of Fish & Snail	Deborah Freedman
2015	Feathers: Not Just for Flying	Melissa Stewart
2016	Fish in a Tree	Lynda Mullaly Hunt
2017	Fearless Flyer: Ruth Law and Her Flying Machine	Heather Lang
2018	This House, Once	Deborah Freedman
2019	The Rough Patch	Brian Lies
2020	The Bridge Home	Padma Venkatraman
2021	Let's Dance!	Valerie Bolling
2022	Red, White, and Whole	Rajani LaRocca
2023	That Egg Is Mine!	Liz Goulet DuBois
2024	Wombats Are Pretty Weird: A [Not So] Serious Guide	Abi Cushman
2025	Small Things Mended	Casey W. Robinson and Nancy Whitesides
2026	Cat Nap	Brian Lies

==== New York ====
Year	Title	Author
2011	Sugar and Ice	Kate Messner
2012	Thelonious Mouse	Orel Protopopescu
2013	Capture the Flag	Kate Messner
2014	Crankenstein!	Samantha Berger
2015	Sniffer Dogs: How Dogs (And Their Noses) are Saving The World	Nancy Castaldo
2016	The Truth About Twinkie Pie	Kat Yeh
2017	Saving Kate’s Flowers	Cindy Sommer
2018	Beastly Brains: Exploring How Animals Think, Talk, and Feel	Nancy Castaldo
2019	Pies from Nowhere: How Georgia Gilmore Sustained the Montgomery Bus Boycott	Dee Romito
2020	The Little Green Girl	Lisa Anchin
2021	The Boy and the Gorilla	Jackie Azúa Kramer
2022	Dumplings for Lili	Melissa Iwai
2023	Don't Look Back	Keely Hutton and Achut Deng
2024	Big	Vashti Harrison
2025	Five Stories	Ellen Weinstein
2026	The Trouble with Heroes	Kate Messner

==== South-East (Florida / Georgia / South Carolina / North Carolina / Alabama / Mississippi) ====
Year	Title	Author
2011	Rosa's Bus: The Ride to Civil Rights	Jo S. Kittinger
2012	Cleopatra's Moon	Vicky Alvear Shecter
2013	Glory Be	Augusta Scattergood
2014	The Ballad of Jessie Pearl	Shannon Hitchcock
2015	Just a Drop of Water	Kerry Cerra
2016	Outer Space Bedtime Race	Rob Sanders
2017	Wish	Barbara O’Connor
2018	Mouse	Zebo Ludvicek
2019	Evangeline of the Bayou	Jan Eldredge
2020	The Boy Who Grew a Forest: The True Story of Jadav Payeng	Sophia Gholz
2021	The Little Blue Cottage	Kelly Jordan
2022	The Longest Letsgoboy	Derick Wilder
2023	Moon Tree	Carolyn Bennett Fraiser and Simona Mulazzani
2024	I Ship: A Container Ship's Colossal Journey	Kelly Schmitt and Jam Dong
2025	Abuelita's Gift: A Día de Muertos Story	Mariana Ríos Ramírez and Sara Palacios
2026	The Blue Jays That Grew a Forest	Lynn Street and Anne Hunter

==== South-West (Nevada / Arizona / Utah / Colorado / Wyoming / New Mexico) ====
Year	Title	Author
2011	Swoon At Your Own Risk	Sydney Salter Husseman
2012	Black & White: The Confrontation Between Reverend Fred L. Shuttlesworth and Eugene "Bull" Connor	Larry Brimner
2013	How to Baby Sit a Grandpa	Jean Reagan
2014	Tea REX	Molly Idle
2015	All Four Stars	Tara Dairman
2016	Audacity	Melanie Crowder
2017	Space Boy and the Space Pirate	Dian Curtis Regan
2018	If Your Monster Won’t Go to Bed	Denise Vega
2019	The 11:11 Wish	Kim Tomsic
2020	Truman	Jean Reidy
2021	Midnight at the Barclay Hotel	Fleur Bradley
2022	Watercress	Andrea Y. Wang
2023	Dark on Light	Dianne White and Felicita Sala
2024	Song After Song: The Musical Life of Julie Andrews	Julie Hedlund and Ilaria Urbinati
2025	The Ofrenda That We Built	Jolene Gutiérrez and Shaian Gutiérrez and Gabby Zapata
2026	The Many Misfortunes of Eugenia Wang	Stan Yan

==== Texas / Oklahoma ====
Year	Title	Author
2011	Mostly Monsterly	Tammi Sauer
2012	Mine!	Patrice Barton
2013	Chained	Lynne Kelly
2014	Army Camels: Texas Ships of the Desert	Doris Fisher
2015	Abby Spencer Goes to Bollywood	Varsha Bajaj
2016	Poet: The Remarkable Story of George Moses Horton	Don Tate
2017	Tiny Stitches – The Life of Medical Pioneer Vivien Thomas	Gwendolyn Hooks
2018	The Youngest Marcher: The Story of Audrey Faye Hendricks, a Young Civil Rights Activist	Cynthia Levinson
2019	The Boy, the Boat, and the Beast	Samantha Clark
2020	Her Own Two Feet: A Rwandan Girl's Brave Fight to Walk	Meredith Davis and Rebeka Uwitonze
2021	Dusk Explorers	Lindsay Leslie
2022	Dark and Shallow Lies	Ginny Myers Sain
2023	Baa, Baa, Tap Sheep	Kenda Henthorn and Lauren Gallegos
2024	Glitter Everywhere! Where It Came From, Where It's Found & Where It's Going	Chris Barton (author) and Chaaya Prabhat
2024	Animals in Surprising Shades: Poems About Earth's Colorful Creatures	Susan Johnston Taylor and Annie Bakst
2025	Lupita's Brown Ballet Slippers	Steena Hernandez and Melissa Castillo
2026	Racing the Clouds	Sydney Dunlap

==== West (Washington / Oregon / Alaska / Idaho / Montana / North Dakota / South Dakota) ====
Year	Title	Author
2011	A Bedtime for Bear	Bonny J. Becker
2012	The Friendship Doll	Kirby Larson
2013	Pickle	Kim Baker
2014	Once Upon A Memory	Nina Laden
2015	Be a Change Maker: How to Start Something That Matters	Laurie Ann Thompson
2016	If You Ever Want to Bring an Alligator to School, DON’T!	Elise Parsley
2017	The Charmed Children of Rookskill Castle by Janet Fox	Janet S. Fox
2018	The Book of Mistakes	Corinna Luyken
2019	Adrian Simcox Does NOT Have A Horse	Marcy Campbell
2020	Ghost Cat	Kevan Atteberry
2021	The Starkeeper	Faith Pray
2022	The Last Cuentista	Donna Barba Higuera
2023	Namaste Is a Greeting	Suma Subramaniam and Sandhya Prabhat
2024	A Stone Is a Story	Leslie Barnard Booth and Marc Martin
2025	One Day This Tree Will Fall	Leslie Barnard Booth and Stephanie Fizer Coleman
2026	I Am We: How Crows Come Together to Survive	Leslie Barnard Booth and Alexandra Finkeldey
