= Jennifer Lanthier =

Canadian writer (born 1964)

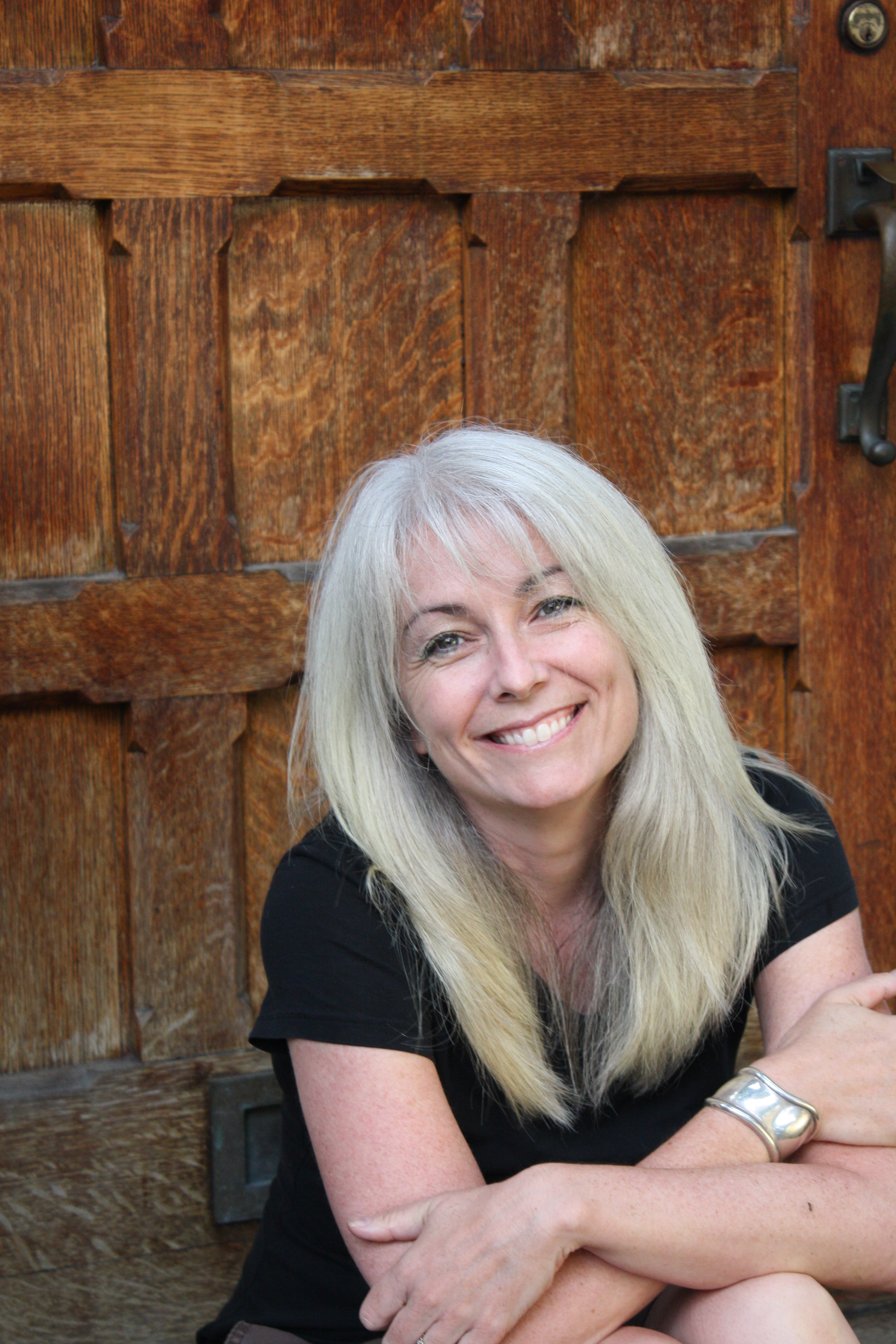
- Jennifer Lanthier August 2012
- Born: Jennifer Deirdre Jane Lanthier; February 29, 1964 (age 62); Toronto, Ontario, Canada
- Education: University of Toronto
- Occupations: Children's Author, Journalist
- Spouse: Stephen Rogers m. 1987
- Writing career
- Notable work: The Stamp Collector (2012)
- Website: www.jenniferlanthier.com

Jennifer Deirdre Jane Lanthier (born February 29, 1964) is a Canadian children's author and journalist. Since August 2016 she has been director, U of T News at the University of Toronto.

== Early life ==
Lanthier was born in Toronto, Ontario to father Jim Lanthier and mother Jane McDougall, and spent her early years in Toronto, St. Catharines and Sudbury, Ontario. She attended secondary school first at Loyalist Collegiate Institute in Kingston, Ontario and then at North Toronto Collegiate Institute.

Lanthier studied Political Science and History at University College, University of Toronto, graduating with her Bachelor of Arts degree in 1985. While at U of T she was a council member of the college student government, The University College Literary and Athletic Society ("the Lit"), and a contributor to student newspapers The Gargoyle and The Newspaper. She then studied Journalism at Ryerson University in Toronto where she served as Editor of the Ryerson School of Journalism's student newspaper, The Ryersonian, and interned at the Ottawa Citizen before joining the newswire service United Press International.

She has also worked for The Financial Post (now The National Post) covering first Labour and then Biotechnology. She has been a speechwriter for the Premier of Ontario and a freelance writer for magazines such as Canadian House & Home and Canadian Living.

== Writing ==
Lanthier's first book, a middle grade novel called The Mystery of the Martello Tower, was published by HarperCollins Canada in 2007 and nominated for a Snow Willow Award. A revised version aimed at younger, American readers was published by Laura Geringer Books (also an imprint of HarperCollins Publishers) in 2008. Martello has been included in numerous competitive reading programs in Canadian and American schools including the British Columbia School District 22 (Vernon) Battle of the Books 2008, the Durham Region (Oshawa, Ontario) Public Libraries Battle of the Books 2009, 2011 & 2013 and the New Mexico Battle of the Books 2009/2010. These motivational reading programs involve teams of children from numerous schools reading books from lists compiled each year by teachers and librarians and answering questions about their content in quiz show-style competitions.

In 2008, HarperCollins Canada published the sequel, The Legend of the Lost Jewels, and the Ontario Library Association's Canadian Materials Committee named it to that year's "Best Bets - Fiction Books for Kids" list. Jewels has been featured in school reading competitions including Woozles' (Halifax, Nova Scotia) Battle of the Books 2009 and the Durham Region Public Libraries Battle of the Books 2010.

Both The Mystery of the Martello Tower and The Legend of the Lost Jewels follow the adventures of heroine Hazel Frump and her younger brother Ned. Lanthier has said the books’ settings, "Ile du Loup" and "Frontenac", were directly inspired by Wolfe Island, Ontario and nearby Kingston. The Martello tower of the first book's title was based on Cathcart Tower on Cedar Island, just south of Fort Henry National Historic Site.

Volunteering with PEN Canada, the Canadian arm of International PEN, Lanthier met the exiled journalist Jiang Weiping, who had spent six years in a Chinese prison for a series of investigative articles he wrote exposing the corruption of the government official, Bo Xilai. That encounter led Lanthier to write her first picture book, The Stamp Collector, published by Fitzhenry & Whiteside in September 2012, with illustrations by Quebec illustrator François Thisdale.

A 1,300-word prose poem, The Stamp Collector is a picture book about two boys – one who grows up to become a writer and one who grows up to become a prison guard – and the power of friendship and stories. An afterword explains the concept of freedom of expression and the work done by PEN and other charities on behalf of writers and journalists at risk in countries around the world. A portion of all proceeds from the book goes to PEN Canada.

In July 2012 Lanthier was selected to participate as a touring author with the TD Canadian Children's Book Week 2013 (May 4–16, 2013). Organized by the Canadian Children's Book Centre, the TD Canadian Children's Book Week is a major national literary festival celebrating Canadian children's books and the importance of reading. Selected authors and illustrators participate in events and activities held in hundreds of schools, public libraries, bookstores and community centres across the country in all provinces and territories.

In October 2012 Indigo Books and Music, Canada's largest book retailer, announced it had selected The Stamp Collector as a "Heather's Pick". The designation, named for the firm's founder and C.E.O. Heather Reisman, bestows featured placement in hundreds of stores nationwide including Indigo, Chapters and Coles.

In January 2013 the United States Board on Books for Young People named The Stamp Collector to its USBBY 2013 Outstanding International Books Honor List. The USBBY is the U.S. national section of the International Board on Books for Young People (IBBY). The following month the Ontario Library Association's Canadian Materials Committee named it to the OLA's 2012 "Best Bets" list. Also in February 2013, The Stamp Collector was selected for the Notable Books for a Global Society Award 2013 by the Children's Literature and Reading Special Interest Group, a nonprofit organization chartered by the International Reading Association (IRA).

In March 2013 The Ezra Jack Keats Foundation awarded Lanthier its New Writer Honor for The Stamp Collector. The Ezra Jack Keats Foundation is a non-profit organization founded by the late Keats and dedicated to enhancing the love of reading and learning in all children.

In April 2013 The Stamp Collector won The Society of Children's Book Writers and Illustrators' Crystal Kite Award - Americas Division. The Crystal Kite Awards are chosen by other children's book writers and illustrators, making them the only peer-given awards in publishing for young readers. Each member of The SCBWI is allowed to vote for their favorite book from a nominated author in their region that was published in the previous calendar year.

In September 2013 The Stamp Collector was named a finalist for both the TD Canadian Children's Literature Award and the Marilyn Baillie Picture Book Award. Both awards are administered by The Canadian Children's Book Centre.

Lanthier's second picture book, Hurry Up, Henry was published September, 2016 by Puffin Books Canada, an imprint of Penguin Random House. The book is illustrated by award-winning Quebec illustrator Isabelle Malenfant. In January 2017 the United States Board on Books for Young People named Hurry up, Henry to its USBBY 2017 Outstanding International Books Honor List.

Lanthier's third picture book, By the time you read this, was published in 2017 by Clockwise Press. It was illustrated by Patricia Storms.

== Professional associations and personal life ==
Lanthier is currently Communications Chair on the Board of Directors of PEN Canada, and has served as a judge for Canada's National Newspaper Awards. She is also a member of CANSCAIP (The Canadian Society of Children's Authors, Illustrators and Performers), Authors Guild, The Canadian Children's Book Centre (CCBC), The Society of Children's Book Writers and Illustrators (SCBWI) and The Writers' Union of Canada.

Lanthier married investment fund manager Stephen Rogers June 30, 1987. They have three children. They reside in Toronto, Ontario, Canada.

She is an avid runner and has a black belt (1st Dan) in Taekwondo.

== Awards and honours ==
- USBBY Outstanding International Books List, 2017 for Hurry up, Henry
- Poet Laureate - 2014 Quebec Peter Gzowski PGI Dinner for Literacy
- Winner - 2014 Golden Oak Award, OLA Forest of Reading, Ontario Library Association, for The Stamp Collector
- IBBY Honour List 2014 for The Stamp Collector, International Board on Books for Young People (IBBY)
- Winner - 2014 Great Books Award, Canadian Toy Testing Council (CTTC), for The Stamp Collector
- Finalist - 2013 TD Canadian Children's Literature Award, Canadian Children's Book Centre (CCBC), for The Stamp Collector
- Finalist - 2013 Marilyn Baillie Picture Book Award, Canadian Children's Book Centre (CCBC), for The Stamp Collector
- Nominee - 2014 Silver Birch Express Award, OLA Forest of Reading, Ontario Library Association, for The Stamp Collector
- Winner - Huguenot Society of Canada Award, Ontario Historical Society, for The Stamp Collector
- Finalist - 2013 Libris Award – Young Readers' Book of the Year, Canadian Booksellers Association (CBA), for The Stamp Collector
- Winner - 2013 Crystal Kite Award, Society of Children's Book Writers and Illustrators (SCBWI) - Americas Division, for The Stamp Collector
- Ezra Jack Keats 2013 New Writer Honor, Ezra Jack Keats Foundation, for The Stamp Collector
- Notable Books for a Global Society Award 2013, International Reading Association (IRA):Children's Literature and Reading Special Interest Group, for The Stamp Collector
- "Best Bets 2012" designation, Ontario Library Association - Canadian Materials Committee, for The Stamp Collector
- USBBY Outstanding International Books List, 2013 for The Stamp Collector
- Canada Council for the Arts Grant, 2008
- Saskatchewan Snow Willow Award nominee, 2008 for The Mystery of the Martello Tower
- "Best Bets - Fiction Books for Kids" designation, Ontario Library Association - Canadian Materials Committee, 2008, for The Legend of the Lost Jewels

== Books ==
- Jennifer Lanthier and Patricia Storms (2017). By the time you read this. Clockwise Press (Toronto, Ontario, Canada). ISBN 978-1-988347-05-9
- Jennifer Lanthier and Isabelle Malenfant (2016). Hurry Up, Henry. Puffin/Penguin Random House Canada (Toronto, Ontario, Canada). ISBN 978-0670068371
- Jennifer Lanthier and Francois Thisdale (2013). Le Collectionneur de Timbres. Fitzhenry & Whiteside (Toronto, Ontario, Canada). ISBN 978-1-55455-325-9
- Jennifer Lanthier and Francois Thisdale (2012). The Stamp Collector. Fitzhenry & Whiteside (Toronto, Ontario, Canada). ISBN 978-1-55455-218-4
- Jennifer Lanthier (2008). The Legend of the Lost Jewels. HarperTrophyCanada (Toronto, Ontario, Canada). ISBN 978-0-06-202670-5
- Jennifer Lanthier (2007). The Mystery of the Martello Tower. HarperCollins Canada (Toronto, Ontario, Canada). ISBN 0-06-125712-5, Laura Geringer Books, (New York, New York)(2008).
