= The Tree of Ecstasy and Unbearable Sadness =

2022 multimodal work by Matt Ottley

- Author: Matt Ottley
- Illustrator: Matt Ottley
- Language: English
- Subject: Bipolar disorder and psychosis
- Publisher: Dirt Lane Press
- Publication date: February 2022
- Publication place: Australia
- Media type: Hardback book, audio recording and animated film
- Pages: 128
- ISBN: 978-0-6480238-5-2

The Tree of Ecstasy and Unbearable Sadness is a 2022 multimodal work by Australian author, illustrator and composer Matt Ottley. Published in book form by Dirt Lane Press, it combines an illustrated narrative about a boy's experience of psychosis with an orchestral score and a 50-minute animated film created from the book's 74 paintings and illustrations.

The work won Best Graphic Novel/Illustrated Work in the 2022 Aurealis Awards and the 2023 World Fantasy Special Award—Professional. It also received a special mention in the CrossMedia Projects category of the 2023 BolognaRagazzi CrossMedia Award.

== Background and development ==
Ottley developed the project over approximately three years, drawing on his experiences of bipolar disorder and psychosis. He intended the work to give audiences an impression of the sensory and emotional experience of psychosis and to encourage greater understanding of people living with mental illness.

The project was conceived as an integrated work rather than solely as an illustrated book. In a 2025 interview with the Bologna Children's Book Fair, Ottley described it as comprising a 128-page picture book, a choral symphony and a 50-minute film, with the narrative communicated through the interaction of its written, visual and musical components.

== Form and content ==
The narrative follows an unnamed boy experiencing psychosis. A tree growing within him, whose flowers represent ecstasy and whose fruit represents sadness, was described by Ottley as an allegory for bipolar disorder.

The book is accompanied by a recording narrated by artist and author Tina Wilson. Its 50-minute score was composed by Ottley with guest composition by pianist Alf Demasi and performed by the Brno Philharmonic Orchestra, the Czech Philharmonic Choir of Brno and tenor Ben Reynolds.

The work also includes a 50-minute animated film constructed from the book's 74 paintings and illustrations.

== Publication and performances ==
Dirt Lane Press released the Australian hardback edition in February 2022. The publication included a CD of the musical component, which was also made available as a download.

The accompanying film was subsequently screened in Australian cinemas and at cultural and educational events. In June 2024, an exhibition of artwork from the project was presented at YAVA Gallery in Healesville, Victoria. Later that year, the film was screened at the Mental Wealth Festival hosted by City Lit in London, with Ottley participating remotely.

== Collection and preservation ==
In July 2025, the State Library of New South Wales purchased from Ottley a collection of material associated with The Tree of Ecstasy and Unbearable Sadness. The collection comprises the work's 74 paintings and digital files, together with manuscripts, musical sound recordings, video and other pictorial material.

== Reception ==
M. H. Alessandrino, reviewing the work for Books+Publishing, described it as a “multimodal sensory feast” and praised the interaction between its poetic language, artwork and musical score. The review considered it a long-form picture book intended for readers aged 15 and over.

In The Saturday Paper, Jennifer Higgie described the work as intricate and emotionally affecting, emphasising that the musical recording forms an essential part of the narrative rather than merely accompanying the book.

Sarah Deeming of the British Fantasy Society praised the changing colour palettes and the relationship between the score and illustrations. She considered its ultimately hopeful treatment of bipolar disorder an important contribution to public discussion of mental illness.

== Awards and recognition ==
The work was shortlisted in the Writing for Young Adults category of the 2023 Victorian Premier's Literary Awards. It was also included in the Children's Book Council of Australia's 2023 Notable List for Picture Book of the Year.

It won the Aurealis Award for Best Graphic Novel/Illustrated Work in the 2022 awards. In 2023, the project received a special mention in the CrossMedia Projects category of the BolognaRagazzi CrossMedia Award and won the World Fantasy Special Award—Professional.
