= Schmatz =

Schmatz is a surname. It means "to smack" or "to chomp" (while eating) in German. Notable people with this surname include:

- Hannelore Schmatz (1940 – 1979), a German mountain climber
- Pat Schmatz (born c. 1960), an American fiction writer
