= Ben Martin =

Ben Martin may refer to:

- Ben Martin (American football) (1921–2004), American football player and coach
- Ben Martin (footballer, born 1982), English footballer
- Ben Martin (golfer) (born 1987), American golfer
- Ben Martin (photographer) (1930–2017), American photographer
- Ben Martin, musician in Clem Snide
- Ben Martin, a fictional character in A Crush on You

== See also ==
- Benjamin Martin (disambiguation)
- Benedict Martin (born 1987), Malaysian footballer
- Ben Martins (born 1956), former Minister of Energy in South Africa
