= Children's Book of the Year Award: Picture Book =

Australian literary award from 1955

- Awarded for: Excellence in Australian picture books
- Country: Australia
- Presented by: Children's Book Council of Australia
- First award: 1955
- Website: http://cbca.org.au/index.htm

The Children's Book of the Year Award: Picture Book has been presented occasionally since 1955 by the Children's Book Council of Australia (CBCA).

The Award "will be made to outstanding books of the Picture Book genre in which the author and illustrator achieve artistic and literary unity, or, in wordless picture books, where the story, theme or concept is unified through illustrations."

== Award winners ==
=== 1950s ===
Year	Author	Illustrator	Book	Publisher	Ref.
1955	No award				
1956	Peggy Barnard	Sheila Hawkins	Wish and the Magic Nut	John Sands	
1957	No award				
1958	Axel Poignant	photographs	Piccaninny Walkabout	Angus & Robertson	
1959	No award				

=== 1960s ===
Year	Author	Illustrator	Book	Publisher	Ref.
1960	No award				
1961	No award				
1962	No award				
1963	No award				
1964	No award				
1965	Elisabeth MacIntyre		Hugh's Zoo	Constable Young Books	
1966	No award				
1968	No award				
1969	Ivan Southall	Ted Greenwood	Sly Old Wardrobe	Cheshire	

=== 1970s ===
Year	Author	Illustrator	Book	Publisher	Ref.
1970	No award				
1971	A. B. Paterson	Desmond Digby	Waltzing Matilda	Collins	
1974	Jenny Wagner	Ron Brooks	The Bunyip of Berkeley's Creek	Longman Young	
1975	A. B. Paterson	Quentin Hole	The Man from Ironbark	Collins	
1976	Dick Roughsey	Dick Roughsey	The Rainbow Serpent	Collins	
1978	Jenny Wagner	Ron Brooks	John Brown, Rose and the Midnight Cat	Viking Kestrel	
1979	Percy Trezise	Dick Roughsey	The Quinkins	Collins	

=== 1980s ===
Year	Author	Illustrator	Book	Publisher	Ref.
1980	Peter Pavey		One Dragon's Dream	Nelson Australia	
1981	No award				
1982	Jan Ormerod	Jan Ormerod	Sunshine	Penguin Books	
1983	Pamela Allen	Pamela Allen	Who Sank the Boat?	Nelson Australia	
1984	Pamela Allen	Pamela Allen	Bertie and the Bear	Nelson Australia	
1985	Not awarded				
1986	Terry Denton	Terry Denton	Felix & Alexander	Oxford University Press	
1987	Helen Smith, text based on a story by Kenji Miyazawa	Junko Morimoto	Kojuro and the Bears	Collins	
1988	Bob Graham	Bob Graham	Crusher is Coming!	Lothian	
1989	Graeme Base	Graeme Base	The Eleventh Hour	Viking Books	
1989	Allan Baillie	Jane Tanner	Drac and the Gremlin	Viking Kestrel	

=== 1990s ===
Year	Author	Illustrator	Book	Publisher	Ref.
1990	Margaret Wild	Julie Vivas	The Very Best of Friends	Margaret Hamilton	
1991	Bob Graham	Bob Graham	Greetings from Sandy Beach	Lothian	
1992	Jeannie Baker		Window	Julia MacRae	
1993	Bob Graham	Bob Graham	Rose Meets Mr Wintergarten	Penguin Books	
1994	Gary Crew	Peter Gouldthorpe	First Light	Lothian	
1995	Gary Crew	Stephen Woolman	The Watertower	Keystone, Era	
1996	Narelle Oliver		The Hunt	Lothian	
1997	Elizabeth Honey		Not a Nibble!	Little Ark	
1998	Junko Morimoto, translated by Isao Morimoto	Junko Morimoto	The Two Bullies	Random House	
1999	John Marsden	Shaun Tan	The Rabbits	Lothian	

=== 2000s ===
Year	Author	Illustrator	Book	Publisher	Ref.
2000	Margaret Wild	Anne Spudvilas	Jenny Angel	Viking Books	
2001	Margaret Wild	Ron Brooks	Fox	Allen and Unwin	
2002	Libby Gleeson	Armin Greder	An Ordinary Day	Scholastic Press	
2003	Norman Jorgensen	Brian Harrison-Lever	In Flanders Fields	Fremantle Arts Centre Press	
2004	Joan Grant	Neil Curtis	Cat and Fish	Lothian	
2005	Alison Lester	Alison Lester	Are We There Yet? A Journey Around Australia	Viking Books	
2006	Colin Thompson		The Short and Incredibly Happy Life of Riley	Lothian	
2007	Shaun Tan	Shaun Tan	The Arrival	Lothian	
2008	Matt Ottley		Requiem for a Beast	Lothian	
2009	Kylie Dunstan		Collecting Colour	Lothian	

=== 2010s ===
Year	Author	Illustrator	Book	Publisher	Ref.
2010	Gregory Rogers		The Hero of Little Street	Allen & Unwin	
2011	Jeannie Baker		Mirror	Walker Books	
2011	Nicki Greenberg		Hamlet	Allen & Unwin	
2012	Bob Graham	Bob Graham	A Bus Called Heaven	Walker Books	
2013	Julie Hunt	Ron Brooks	The Coat	Allen & Unwin	
2014	Shaun Tan	Shaun Tan	Rules of Summer	Hachette Australia	
2015	Irena Kobald	Freya Blackwood	My Two Blankets	Little Hare, Hardie Grant Egmont	
2016	Nadia Wheatley	Armin Greder	Flight	Windy Hollow Books	
2017	Bob Graham	Bob Graham	Home in the Rain	Walker Books	
2018	Gwyn Perkins	Gwyn Perkins	A Walk in the Bush	Affirm Press	
2019	Shaun Tan	Shaun Tan	Cicada	Lothian	

=== 2020s ===
Year	Author	Illustrator	Book	Publisher	Ref.
2020	Chris McKimmie	Chris McKimmie	I Need a Parrot	Ford Street	
2021	Meg McKinlay	Matt Ottley	How to Make a Bird	Walker Books	
2022	Claire Saxby	Jess Racklyeft	Iceberg	Allen & Unwin	
2023	Zeno Sworder	Zeno Sworder	My Strange Shrinking Parents	Thames & Hudson	
2024	Kelly Canby	Kelly Canby	Timeless	Fremantle Press	
2025	Deborah Frenkel	Danny Snell	The Truck Cat	Bright Light	
2026	Zeno Sworder	Zeno Sworder	Once I Was a Giant	Thames & Hudson	

== See also ==
- List of CBCA Awards
- List of Australian literary awards
