= The Two Bullies =

Book by Junko Morimoto

- Author: Junko Morimoto, Isao Morimoto (translator)
- Illustrator: Junko Morimoto
- Language: English
- Genre: Children's picture book
- Published: 1997 (Random House (Australia))
- Publication place: Australia
- Media type: Print (hardback)
- Pages: 32 (unpaginated)
- ISBN: 9780517800614
- OCLC: 39800642

The Two Bullies is a 1997 children's picture book by Junko Morimoto. It is based on a Japanese folktale, Ni-Ou and Dokkoi and is about two bullies (strong men), one Japanese, the other Chinese who are going to fight one another but through some humorous events do not, much to their relief.

== Reception ==
When reviewing The Two Bullies, Publishers Weekly wrote "Imbued with a Japanese sensibility, Morimoto's artwork is a model of balance, her spare, uncluttered backdrops and clean sweep of brushwork creating a strong visual presence in this subtly humorous picture book" and concluded "their (the bullies') story is not just entertaining but also a lively commentary on the true nature of bullies." A child reviewer found it "an enjoyable book".

In 2012 Reading Australia included The Two Bullies on its First 200 list.

== Awards ==
1998 winner Children's Book Council Book of the Year Awards — Picture Book of the Year
1997 winner New South Wales Premier's Literary Awards — Ethel Turner Prize
