= Elisabeth MacIntyre =

Australian children's writer and illustrator

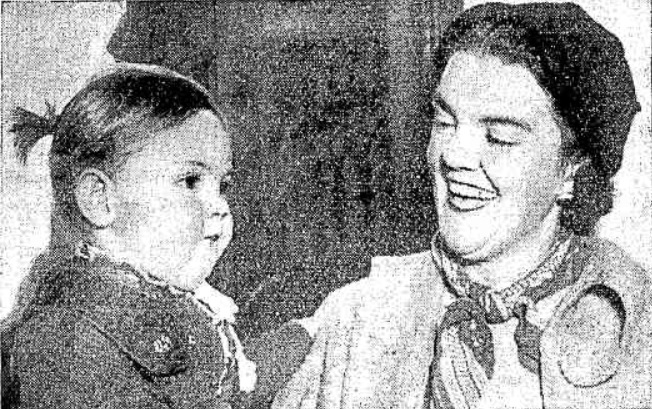
- Elisabeth MacIntyre and daughter Jane, 1953
- Born: Elisabeth Innes MacIntyre; 1 November 1916; Sydney, New South Wales, Australia
- Died: 7 July 2004 (aged 87)
- Education: East Sydney Technical College
- Occupations: Writer, illustrator
- Spouse: John Roy Eldershaw
- Children: Jane Eldershaw
- Writing career
- Years active: 1941–1982
- Genres: Picture books, cartoon strips, YA novels
- Notable works: Ambrose Kangaroo; Susan, Who Lives in Australia or Katherine; Hugh's Zoo
- Notable awards: Children's Book of the Year Award: Picture Book, 1965

Elisabeth MacIntyre (born Elisabeth Innes MacIntyre, also spelled Elizabeth MacIntyre; 1 November 1916 – 7 July 2004) was an Australian writer and illustrator. She mainly produced children's picture books and cartoon strips, but also created cartoon strips for adults and novels for young adults. She is recognised as "a staunch advocate of promoting Australian animals and surrounds in an era when the majority of children's books were imported from England". Her picture books appealed for their lively, bright illustrations and "irresistible", "infectious", stories (several in rhyme), which used line and words economically and effectively. She was successful in the Australian, American and British markets, and some of her novels were also translated into German and Japanese. Her best known works are Ambrose Kangaroo, Susan, Who Lives in Australia (also published as Katherine), and Hugh's Zoo, for which she won the Australian Children's Book of the Year Award: Picture Book in 1965.

== Biography ==
MacIntyre was born in Sydney on 1 November 1916, the daughter of John Norman MacIntyre, owner of a station near Burketown, North Queensland, and his wife Laura Minnie (née Rendall). She had one brother and one sister (playwright Peggy C. MacIntyre), and grew up in country New South Wales. Her grandfather Donald MacIntyre, of Dalgonally Station in north Queensland, was the cousin of Duncan McIntyre, an explorer. MacIntyre became deaf in her teenage years as a result of an accident. She attended first SCEGGS Darlinghurst, and then Bowral High School. She studied commercial art at East Sydney Technical College, and credited Thea Proctor for giving her encouragement and inspiration in her art. She worked as a graphic designer, starting at a printing company in Woolloomooloo, where her first job was to design display cards, and then at an advertising company, where she designed soap and cosmetics packaging. During World War II, MacIntyre worked as a fruit picker in the Women's Land Army. She married artist John Roy Eldershaw in about 1950; they had one daughter, and lived at Narrabeen on Sydney's Northern Beaches. When her marriage ended, MacIntyre took other jobs, including working in the display section of department store David Jones.

== Career ==
=== Ambrose Kangaroo ===
MacIntyre sketched ideas for toys and children's books while working on her assigned tasks at the advertising agency. She published her first book, Ambrose Kangaroo, in Sydney in 1941. She also sent it to Scribner's in the US, who published it the following year. A Canadian reviewer considered it outstanding, and US reviewers thought Ambrose was "delightfully droll", "just as amusing as Ferdinand the Bull". One US reviewer wrote, "Never did kangaroos look like [this]. But we would not have it otherwise for Ambrose in his blue trousers and wearing a suggestion of a yellow hat between his enormous ears bids fair to captivate a very young audience." Australian reviewers also liked Ambrose Kangaroo, finding it an "irresistible story", which "will entrance the small fry". Ambrose went into several Australian editions, and returned in further books in Ambrose kangaroo has a busy day (1944), Ambrose Kangaroo goes to town (1964), and Ambrose kangaroo delivers the goods (1978). From 1945, MacIntyre also drew an Ambrose Kangaroo comic strip for the Sunday Telegraph, Sydney, for about seven years, and created an Ambrose Kangaroo TV cartoon, which screened on ABC TV from 1958.

=== Cartoon strips ===
MacIntyre also created several other comic strips during the 1950s. One featured George, "a studious little boy who wanted to learn all about Australia", published in Melbourne; Annabelle, published in the Australian Women's Weekly, a "gay, irresponsible, exasperating, far-from-perfect secretary ... [who] you can't help liking"; and Mother, a weekly cartoon in another women's magazine, whose "hardships and experiences are mainly autobiographical", according to MacIntyre.

=== Informational picture books ===
Following the US publication of Ambrose in 1942, MacIntyre was asked by Scribners to write about Australia for an American audience, as many American servicemen were based in Australia, and their families wanted to learn about the country. Susan, Who Lives in Australia was published in the US in 1944, and subsequently published in Australia in 1946 under the title Katherine. The main character was a small girl who lived on a sheep station and had a holiday in Sydney. MacIntyre travelled to America in the early 1950s to meet with her publishers there, and to learn about the reading tastes of American children. Her success in the American market boosted her status in Australia. Two later revised editions of Katherine were published in Australia in 1958 and 1963, and all were warmly received, with reviewers in 1946 describing it as charming, while a 1958 reviewer called it "one of the most delightful Australian books issued for a long time. Lively, sunny drawings of pets, people and recognisable places and an agreeable rhyming text will make it a favourite". Muir's A history of Australian children's book illustration considered it "undoubtedly one of the most outstanding Australian childrens [sic] books of the immediate post-war period", while the biographical dictionary Twentieth-century children's writers described it as "a straightforward, amusing, uncomplicated description of a little girl "who lives in Australia/ With her toys and her pets and her paraphernalia" [which] has proved to have the most universal and lasting appeal" of MacIntyre's books.

Other non-fiction works which followed Katherine were Willie's Woollies: The Story of Australian Wool (1951) and Jane Likes Pictures (1959). MacIntyre visited a sheep station near Coolac to make sketches for Willie's Woollies, in which she also showed processing in woollen mills and garment manufacturing. The illustrations and text had previously appeared in strip form in The Age newspaper's children's section; colour was added to the drawings for the book. Reviewers thought it excellent, "[i]nstructive as well as amusing ... [with] most expressive drawings"; "done gaily and simply with colored pictures and a minimum of words. .. combines fun with information". MacIntyre also produced a project sheet about wool for junior school students which was published by the Australian Wool Bureau in 1953.
Jane Likes Pictures was inspired by MacIntyre's daughter's interest in art, and her friends who firstly found her odd, and then joined her in drawing. It was intended to introduce young children to drawing and painting, and reviewers considered it "delightful"; "a happy book that makes drawing fun"; "of immediate appeal ... an original and stimulating approach to art for the very young .. [with] a nice economy of words in the text and of line in the illustrations. The "tricks that are easy to do" ... will no doubt lead to some hilarious moments when the young try them out."

MacIntyre's training and experience in commercial art contributed greatly to her success as a children's illustrator. MacIntyre herself said, "Children's books have to be simplified, and simplified. ... The idea is to say what the picture doesn't convey, and vice versa. I had good training ... in an advertising agency. Often there was only two or three inches in which to convey all about a product and use an illustration."

=== Fictional picture books ===
Mr. Koala Bear (1954) was another of MacIntyre's fictional picture books for young children, about an elderly koala who is unexpectedly visited by two young koalas, who believe he is their uncle. It was commended by the Children's Book Council of Australia in the 1955 awards, for "its humorous and pleasing illustrations." One reviewer thought, "The pictures, bright and gay as the mischief they portray, are more fun than the rhymes." Another wrote, "The jingles are so musical you almost want to sing them", and another suggested that the "delightful picture book in rhyme ... lends itself best to reading aloud." A Times Literary Supplement reviewer found it "not quite at [her] best but still out of the ordinary. Elisabeth MacIntyre supports a thinnish story about Mr. Koala Bear with infectious rhyming couplets and her usual sparkling drawings".

MacIntyre illustrated two children's books written by other authors, Three Cheers for Piggy Grunter by Noreen Shelley (1959), and The Story House by Ruth Fenner (1960), both published in Australia by Angus & Robertson. Both were entered into the Children's Book Council of Australia Children's Book of the Year Award: Picture Book, which was first awarded in 1956. Jane Likes Pictures was also entered in 1960, the same year as Three Cheers for Piggy Grunter. No awards for the picture book category were made in either 1960 or 1961. A report about the 1960 awards did not comment on the individual titles, but said, "the text should have literary value ... [which] is the main hurdle for entrants." It was reported in 1961 that the judges found Fenner's stories "undistinguished", although the same report commented "The pictures are gay and will be patted, and otherwise enjoyed by young children. The end papers are the best piece of illustration."

=== Picture books about conservation ===
MacIntyre wrote in 1978 that her books were "a sincere attempt to say something I really believe in. A straight book about Conservation might seem dull, but, as I see it, my Affable, Amiable Bulldozer Man sums up the whole subject painlessly." Both Hugh's Zoo (1964) and The Affable, Amiable Bulldozer Man (1965) had messages about the conservation of Australian native flora and fauna. Hugh's Zoo tells of a boy who creates his own menagerie by catching birds and animals in the bush. A dog helps the creatures escape; Hugh is at first distraught, but comes to see that they are happier in their own environment, with others of their kind, and can still be enjoyed there. A Times Literary Supplement reviewer considered it "up to [MacIntyre's] usual high standard in being entertaining, factually based and thoroughly sensible".

Hugh's Zoo won the Children's Book of the Year Award: Picture Book in 1965. The award was controversial; the judges' decision was not unanimous, and they were disappointed by the number of entries and the overall standard. However, they felt that Hugh's Zoo was "strongly and effectively presented with honesty and sincerity." There was also much discussion by librarians in their professional journal. In the Sydney Morning Herald and the Canberra Times, reviewers approved of the award, saying that it was "well deserved .... intelligent and highly entertaining", and noting that the "[v]ocabulary is not of the sieved-apple-and custard variety, but grown-up here and there; children of all ages lick their lips over new words."

In The Affable, Amiable Bulldozer Man, a bulldozer comes to clear bush, in the process destroying the homes of birds, animals and insects. One small ant bites the driver of the bulldozer, and the story has a happy ending. Kathleen Commins in The Sydney Morning Herald thought it was "sensitively told ... [with] some appreciative and gentle ridicule of the kind of places that would replace the forest." A US reviewer, however, while recognising that destruction of forest and habitat occurred in the US as in Australia, found "the rhymes .. facile, the pictures amusing but ordinary." Another Australian reviewer thought that the intended audience of young readers would invest the bulldozer with "the same magical significance as the steam engine or fire engine had for their parents."

=== Novels for children and young adults ===
MacIntyre received a three-year Children's Literature Fellowship from the Australia Council to visit the United States from 1974 to 1976, in order to study and write in the newly emerging genre of young adult literature. She also travelled to New Guinea, Italy and Japan, the latter with a grant from the Australia-Japan Foundation in 1976. MacIntyre said in 1978, "At first I wrote and illustrated picture books, using words sparingly. Now less interested in how things look, and more concerned in how they seem to be."

Ninji's Magic (1966) was MacIntyre's first full-length novel, for an older age-group than her previous books, and was also the first that she did not illustrate; the drawings were by Mamoru Funai. It was set in New Guinea, about a young boy from the highlands and his encounter with white people and western education. Reviewers described the story as "absorbing"; "informative, sympathetically told"; "an excellent picture of the old and the new in New Guinea". One reviewer thought that, "[a]lthough .. a sympathetic interpretation of a small boy's problems and aspirations, at times the theme seems contrived for a didactic purpose." Another said, "a good story ... [its] primary importance is that through such stories young readers can come to understand certain common conflicts which exist in all cultures and that it is the lot of the young to know change [and] to adjust to it."

MacIntyre's other novels were The Purple Mouse (1975), It looks different when you get there (1978), and A wonderful way to learn the language (1982). The Purple Mouse features a girl called Hatty, who, like MacIntyre herself, is deaf. Reviews were mixed. School Library Journal wrote "This treatment of hearing impairment shows that, given enough clichés, any problem can be solved", and suggested other novels which offered "believable characters, credible plots, and honest representations of the implications of this handicap." Another reviewer thought Hatty showed "a good deal of sensitivity and intelligence", and considered the book "particularly appropriate for adolescents who ... see themselves as misfits." The main character of It looks different when you get there is a student who becomes pregnant, leaves university to have the baby, and moves around trying to find a place where she belongs. One reviewer thought that "though the ending is rather facile there are some well-observed glimpses of people and different life-styles."

Ninji's Magic and It looks different when you get there were translated into Japanese; Ninji's Magic was also translated into German.

=== Other work ===
MacIntyre also wrote radio serials and contributed articles about her travels, craft ideas, etc., to publications such as The Bulletin and the Australian Women's Weekly.

MacIntyre had started drafting designs for toys before the publication of her first book. She made several attempts to sell her toys. In 1941, she held an exhibition at the Macquarie Galleries in Sydney of wheeled toys, painted toys made of wood, felt and fluffy dusters, and painted nursery plaques and pictures. She made many toy animals, including Ambrose Kangaroo, and other Australian animals such as emu and platypus, non-native animals including a giraffe and horses, as well as soldiers and a street cart. In the late 1960s, MacIntyre made models of Australian fauna as ornaments, starting with plastic-coated wire covered with fabric, and then, recognising a need for "something to send overseas that was light, bright, and Australian", moulding them in plastic. She named them "Currency Lads", a play on the decimal currency introduced in Australia in 1966, as all six coins featured Australian fauna, and on the term Currency lads and lasses to refer to the first generations of people of British descent born in Australia. She did not have plans for marketing them, but said, "I feel I'm making a start and doing my best. If it makes someone say, 'I can do better,' and that someone does better, then it's worth while."

== Selected publications ==
- 1941 Ambrose Kangaroo (Australian Consolidated Press)
- 1944 Susan, Who Lives in Australia (Scribner's, USA)
- 1944 The Black Lamb (Jons Productions, Sydney)
- 1946 Katherine (Australian version of Susan, The Australian Publishing Company; revised editions in 1958 (Angus & Robertson) and 1963)
- 1951 Willie's Woollies (Georgian House, Melbourne)
- 1954 Mr. Koala Bear (Scribner's, USA)
- 1956 'Susan and the sheep stealing', a chapter in Round the year story book (ed. P. R. Gawthorn; Purnell and Sons, London)
- 1959 Jane likes Pictures (Collins, London)
- 1964 Hugh's Zoo (Constable Young Books, London)
- 1965 The Affable, Amiable Bulldozer Man (Angus & Robertson, Sydney)
- 1966 Ninji's Magic (Knopf, USA)
- 1975 The Purple Mouse (Nelson, USA)
- 1978 It looks different when you get there (Hodder & Stoughton, Sydney)
- 1978 Ambrose kangaroo delivers the goods (Angus & Robertson, Sydney)
- 1982 A wonderful way to learn the language (Hodder and Stoughton, Sydney)

== Awards ==
- 1955 – Mr. Koala Bear, Children's Book of the Year Award: Picture Book: Commended
- 1965 – Hugh's Zoo, Children's Book of the Year Award: Picture Book: Winner
- 1974–1976 – Children's Literature Fellowship from the Australia Council for the Arts
- 1976 – Australia-Japan Foundation grant
