= Andrea Cheng =

Hungarian-American author (1957–2015)

- Born: September 19, 1957; El Paso, Texas, United States
- Died: December 26, 2015 (aged 58)
- Education: Cornell University (BA, MS)
- Spouse: Jim Cheng
- Children: 3
- Writing career
- Years active: 1991–2015
- Genres: Young adult fiction, picture books, middle grade, poetry, chapter books, non-fiction
- Notable works: Anna Wang Series, Shanghai Messenger
- Notable awards: 2005–2006 Asian/Pacific American Award for Young Adult Literature
- Website: www.andreacheng.com

Andrea Cheng (September 19, 1957 – December 26, 2015) was a Hungarian-American author of children's books and poet, best known for her Anna Wang Series of middle grade novels and Shanghai Messenger. She has written over 25 books, spanning genres like Picture books, young adult, Chapter books, non-fiction, and poetry.

== Personal life ==
Cheng was born in El Paso, Texas. She was raised in Cincinnati, Ohio, as the child of Hungarian immigrant parents who originally came from Australia and emigrated in 1954. Cheng was raised in a predominantly African-American neighborhood and was the youngest of three siblings. She grew up speaking both English and Hungarian.

She graduated with a bachelor's degree in Teaching English as a Second language from Cornell University in 1979. After graduation, she apprenticed to become a bookbinder and studied French and taught English in Switzerland. After she returned from Switzerland, she studied at Cornell University to receive her master's degree in Linguistics.

In addition to writing books, she taught English as a Second Language as well as Children's Literature at Cincinnati State Technical and Community College.

== Death ==
Cheng died of breast cancer on December 26, 2015, at the age of 58, after a long illness. Two of her manuscripts were published posthumously.

== Works ==
=== Picture books ===
- Grandfather Counts (Lee & Low Books, 2000)
- When the Bees Fly Home, illustrated by Joline McFadden (Tilbury House Publishers, 2002)
- Anna the Bookbinder, illustrated by Ted Rand (Walker Children's, 2003)
- Goldfish and Chrysanthemums (Lee & Low Books, 2003)
- Shanghai Messenger, illustrated by Ed Young (Lee & Low Books, 2005)
- The Lemon Sisters, illustrated by Tatiana Mai-Wyss (Putnam, 2006)
- Tire Mountain, illustrated by Ken Condon (Boyds Mills Press, 2007)
- Only One Year, co-authored with Alma Ada, illustrated by Nicole Wong (Lee & Low Books, 2007)
- Bees in the City, illustrated by Sarah McMenemy (Tilbury House Publishers, 2017)

=== Young adult ===
- Marika (Scholastic, 2004)
- The Bear Makers (Front Street, Incorporated, 2008)
- Brushing Mom's Hair, illustrated by Nicole Wong (Wordsong, 2009)

=== Chapter books ===
- Only One Year, illustrated by Nicole Wong (Lee & Low Books, 2010)

=== Middle grade ===
- The Key Collection, illustrated by Yangsook Choi (Henry Holt, 2003)
- Honeysuckle House (Boyd Mills Press, 2004)
- The Lace Dowry (Front Street, Incorporated, 2005)
- Eclipse (Front Street, Incorporated, 2006)
- Where the Steps Were (Wordsong, 2008)
- Where Do You Stay? (Boyd Mills Press, 2011)
- Anna Wang Series
  1. The Year of the Garden, illustrated by Patrice Barton (HMH, 2017)
  2. The Year of the Book, illustrated by Abigail Halpin (HMH, 2012)
  3. The Year of the Baby, illustrated by Patrice Barton (HMH, 2013)
  4. The Year of the Fortune Cookie, illustrated by Patrice Barton (HMH, 2014)
  5. The Year of the Three Sisters, illustrated by Patrice Barton (HMH, 2015)
- Etched in Clay: The Life of Dave, Enslaved Potter and Poet (Lee & Low Books, 2012)

=== Non-fiction ===
- Lets Make a Present: Easy to Make Gifts for Friends and Relatives of All Ages (Marquis Who's Who, 1991)

== Awards ==
=== Won ===
- 2005–2006 Asian/Pacific American Award for Young Adult Literature for Shanghai Messenger
- 2014 Lee Bennett Hopkins Poetry Award for Children's Poetry for Etched in Clay
