= Requiem for a Beast =

2007 multi-modal work by Matt Ottley

- Author: Matt Ottley
- Publication date: 2007

Requiem for a Beast is a 2007 multi-modal work by Matt Ottley, incorporating a graphic novel and musical composition. It won Children's Book of the Year Award: Picture Book in 2008.
