= Ted Rand =

American illustrator (1916-2005)

- Born: 1916; Mercer Island, Washington, US
- Died: 2005 (aged 88–89)
- Occupation: Illustrator

Ted Rand (1916-2005) was an American illustrator who illustrated children's novels in his 60s, 70s, and 80s. He was born in 1916 on Mercer Island, Washington. He started drawing early in his youth, traveled the world, and did portraits and advertising illustrations. He was a member of the Naval Air Corps during World War II. He became a graphic artist at Frederick & Nelson, and the Bon Marché, before founding a company called Graphic Studios. Rand also taught at the University of Washington for 20 years.

Rand illustrated 78 children's books. His drawings are on display around the country. He was awarded the Kerlan Award in May 2005 posthumously. Rand died of cancer before he could accept the award. Some of his more recognizable works include the Salty Dog series, If Not for the Cat, and A Pen Pal for Max.

== Select publications ==
- Bunting, Eve (1991). Night Tree. Harcourt. ISBN 0-15-257425-5.
- Osofsky, Audrey (1992). My Buddy. New York: Henry Holt and Company. ISBN 978-0-8050-1747-2.
- Rand, Gloria (1992). Prince William. New York: Henry Holt. ISBN 978-0-8050-1841-7.
- Kinsey-Warnock, Natalie; Kinsey, Helen (1993). The Bear That Heard Crying. New York: Cobblehill Books/Dutton. ISBN 978-0-525-65103-1.
- McNulty, Faith (1994). A Snake in the House. New York: Scholastic. ISBN 978-0-590-44758-4.
- Gibbons, Faye (1996). Mountain Wedding. Morrow. ISBN 0-688-11348-6.
- Bunting, Eve (1996). Secret Place. New York: Clarion Books. ISBN 978-0-395-64367-9.
- Rand, Gloria (1997). Baby in a Basket. New York: Cobblehill Books. ISBN 978-0-525-65233-5.
- Lesser, Carolyn (1997). Storm on the Desert. San Diego: Harcourt Brace & Co. ISBN 978-0-15-272198-5.
- Tunnell, Michael O. (1997). Mailing May. Morrow. ISBN 0-688-12878-5.
- Rand, Gloria (1998). A Home for Spooky. New York: Henry Holt & Co. ISBN 978-0-8050-4611-3.
- Cleary, Beverly (1998). The Hullaboo ABC. Morrow. ISBN 0-688-15182-5.
- Garland, Sherry (1998). My Father's Boat. New York: Scholastic. ISBN 978-0-590-47867-0.
- McNulty, Faith (1999). How Whales Walked into the Sea. Scholastic. ISBN 0-590-89830-2.
- Ross, Alice; Ross, Kent (1999). Jezebel's Spooky Spot. New York: Dutton Children's Books. ISBN 978-0-525-45448-9.
- Bunting, Eve (2000). The Memory String. New York: Clarion Books. ISBN 978-0-395-86146-2.
- George, Jean Craighead (2001). Nutik & Amaroq Play Ball. New York: HarperCollins. ISBN 978-0-06-028166-3.
- George, Jean Craighead (2001). Nutik, the Wolf Pup. New York: HarperCollins. ISBN 978-0-06-028164-9.
- Rand, Gloria (2001). Sailing Home: A Story of a Childhood at Sea. New York: North-South Books. ISBN 978-0-7358-1540-7.
- Cummins, Julie (2002). Country Kid, City Kid. New York: H. Holt. ISBN 978-0-8050-6467-4.
- Schertle, Alice (2002). Good Night, Hattie, My Dearie, My Dove. HarperCollins. ISBN 0-688-16022-0.
- Bradby, Marie (2002). Once Upon a Farm. New York: Orchard Books. ISBN 978-0-439-31766-5.
- Cheng, Andrea (2003). Anna the Bookbinder. New York: Walker. ISBN 978-0-8027-8831-3. OCLC 51887717.
- Blumenthal, Deborah (2003). Ice Palace. New York: Clarion Books. ISBN 978-0-618-15960-4.
- Kay, Verla (2003). Homespun Sarah. New York: G.P. Putnam's Sons. ISBN 978-0-399-23417-0.
- Karim, Roberta (2004). Faraway Grandpa. New York: Henry Holt. ISBN 978-0-8050-6785-9.
- Prelutsky, Jack (2004). If Not for the Cat: Haiku. New York: Greenwillow Books. ISBN 978-0-06-059677-4.
- Rand, Gloria (2004). Mary Was A Little Lamb. New York: H. Holt. ISBN 978-0-8050-6816-0.
- Crum, Shutta (2004). My Mountain Song. Boston: Houghton Mifflin Harcourt. ISBN 978-0-618-15970-3.
- Rand, Gloria (2005). A Pen Pal for Max. New York: Henry Holt. ISBN 978-0-8050-7586-1.
