= Aristotle (children's book) =

2003 children's book by Dick King-Smith

- First edition cover
- Author: Dick King-Smith
- Illustrator: Bob Graham
- Language: English
- Genre: Children's
- Publisher: Walker Books
- Publication date: 1 September 2003
- Publication place: United Kingdom
- Pages: 144
- ISBN: 978-0-7445-8320-5
- OCLC: 52695600

Aristotle is a 2003 English-language children's book written by Dick King-Smith and illustrated by Bob Graham, published in 2003. The story concerns Aristotle the kitten, who depends on his nine lives and the magical powers of his owner (a friendly witch) in order to emerge safely from various adventures. Shortly after it was recommended to them by Joe Harper, it was shortlisted for a Blue Peter Book Award.
