= Tina Wilson =

Australian artist and arts administrator

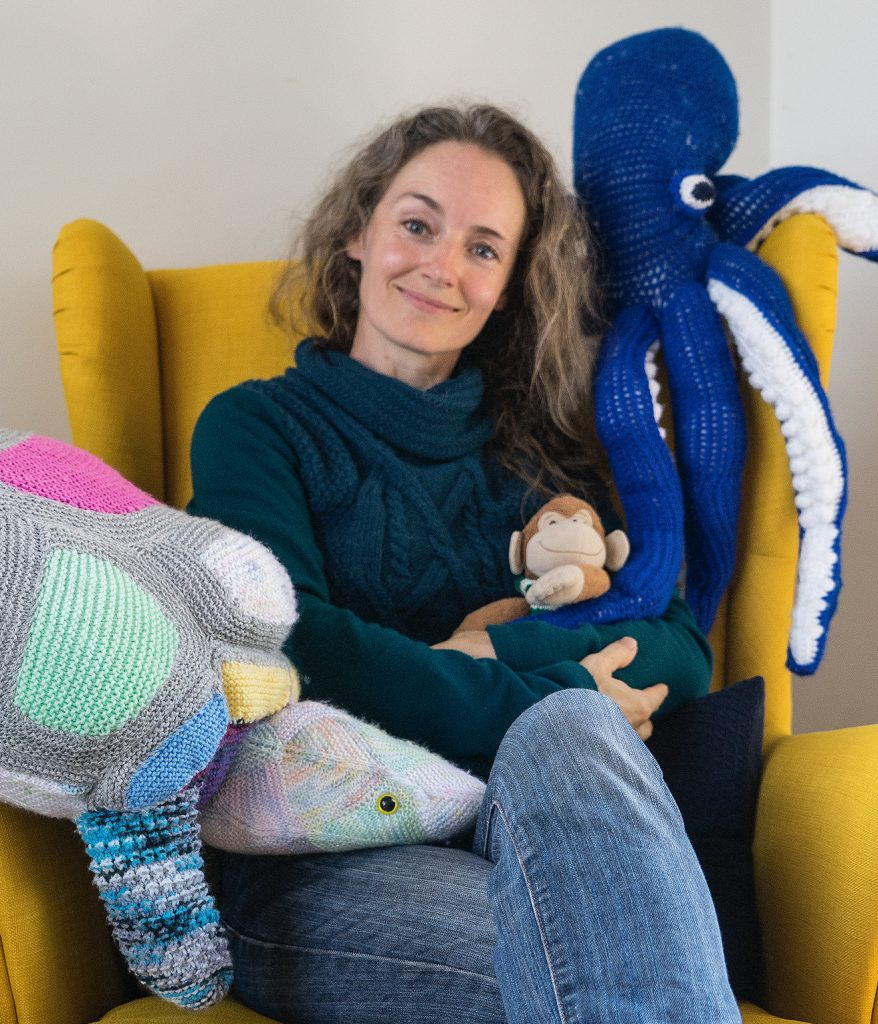
Tina Wilson

Tina Wilson is an Australian visual artist, illustrator, author, curator and arts administrator. She founded the Black Swan Prize for Portraiture, now known as the Lester Prize, and served as its executive director. In 2023, Wilson received the Medal of the Order of Australia for service to the visual arts. She has written and illustrated children's picture books and is the co-director and narrator of The Sound of Picture Books, a live-performance initiative created by Matt Ottley.

== Early life and education ==
Wilson grew up on her family's sheep farm in Snake Valley, Victoria, near Ballarat, and was one of five children. A 1996 profile published by the University of Newcastle described her childhood interest in animals and drawing as an influence on her artwork. She attended Ballarat High School, where she studied art and graphics, and credited art teacher Len Brookman with encouraging her to pursue an artistic career.

Wilson moved to Newcastle to study visual arts at the University of Newcastle, completing a Bachelor of Arts (Visual Arts) with a major in plant and wildlife illustration. While studying, she won the contemporary and watercolour sections of the William Dobell Art Competition and received second and third prizes in an Australian Entomological Society insect-illustration competition.

== Career ==
=== Black Swan Prize for Portraiture ===
In 2007, Wilson founded ARTrinsic Inc., a not-for-profit organisation that established the Black Swan Prize for Portraiture in Western Australia. According to Business News, Wilson presented property investor Dick Lester with a business case, budget and proposal for a portraiture prize, and the two subsequently established the competition.

By 2011, The West Australian reported that the prize had doubled in scale since its inaugural year and had attracted a record 175 entries. It offered a first prize of $35,000 and a $7,500 people's choice prize.

Wilson served as the prize's executive director and oversaw the relocation of its principal awards and exhibition to the Art Gallery of Western Australia in 2016. After stepping down to return to her artistic practice, she became a patron of the prize in 2018. The competition was renamed the Lester Prize in 2019.

=== Visual art ===
In May 2018, Wilson presented An Intimate Nature at Art Post Uki. The exhibition combined studies of natural forms with quotations contributed by members of the local community. Later that year, Domain interviewed Wilson about the gallery's role in providing exhibition opportunities and fostering community engagement in Uki.

=== Writing and illustration ===
Wilson wrote and illustrated the children's picture book Afloat in Venice (2021), the first title in her Monkey's Great Adventures series. Its images combine photographs of real locations with toy characters and props knitted by Wilson's mother, Joan Wilson. The book also includes music composed by Matt Ottley. In 2022, Afloat in Venice received a bronze medal in the Animals/Pets–Fiction category of the Moonbeam Children's Book Awards.

Wilson later illustrated Nicholas Bennett's collection of poetry and prose, The Dying Alchemists. The Australian Broadcasting Corporation reported that the book was published by One Tentacle Publishing and illustrated by Wilson.

Wilson's picture book The Messy Bath Monster features marine characters hand-knitted by her mother, Joan Wilson. According to the Tweed Valley Weekly, Wilson's Monkey's Great Adventures books developed as a family collaboration after Ottley gave her the original toy Monkey. The Messy Bath Monster also includes music composed by Ottley and a recording of the text narrated by Wilson, accessed through a QR code.

=== The Sound of Picture Books ===
The Sound of Picture Books is a live-performance initiative devised by artist, author and composer Matt Ottley. It combines narration, projected illustrations and music composed for individual picture books. In 2023, The West Australian reported that Ottley had worked with the Literature Centre, Yamaha and the West Australian Symphony Orchestra on the project for approximately a decade. Wilson is the initiative's co-director and narrator.

Wilson's picture book Afloat in Venice was adapted for the project. In November 2021, the Literature Centre and the West Australian Symphony Orchestra presented the work in Fremantle. The performances included seven WASO musicians, pianist Alf Demasi, music composed by Ottley and narration by Wilson. A 2023 season featuring Afloat in Venice was presented in Fremantle, Bunbury and Geraldton. The Literature Centre reported that 1,440 young people and 284 adults attended the performances across the three venues.

Wilson's second Monkey's Great Adventures book, The Messy Bath Monster, was incorporated into the performance series in 2025. The production combined storytelling and projected imagery with Wilson's hand-knitted characters and Ottley's musical score. A Geraldton performance featured Wilson, Ottley and members of the Perth Symphony Orchestra as part of a Western Australian tour.

In 2026, Western Suburbs Weekly reported that the performance format had expanded to Australia's east coast, where Wilson and Ottley worked together. Wilson also participated in performances at Hale School featuring The Messy Bath Monster and Danny Parker's Hari's Bones.

== Honours and recognition ==
- 2013 – Premier's Active Citizenship Award, City of Perth.
- 2023 – Medal of the Order of Australia in the General Division, for service to the visual arts.
- 2026 – Wilson's picture book The Messy Bath Monster was shortlisted in the 3 to 5 Years category of the Speech Pathology Australia Book of the Year Awards.

== Selected publications ==
- Wilson, Tina (2018). An Intimate Nature: Volume 1: A Collection of Artworks by Tina Wilson. One Tentacle Publishing. ISBN 9780648006824.
- Wilson, Tina (2021). Afloat in Venice. Music by Matt Ottley; knitted characters by Joan Wilson. One Tentacle Publishing. ISBN 9780648511960.
- Bennett, Nicholas (2023). The Dying Alchemists: Reflections on Existence. Illustrated and designed by Tina Wilson. One Tentacle Publishing. ISBN 9780648511991.
- Wilson, Tina (2025). The Messy Bath Monster. Music by Matt Ottley; knitted characters by Joan Wilson. One Tentacle Publishing. ISBN 9780648511946.
