= Bob Graham (author/illustrator) =

Australian illustrator and writer (born 1942)

- Born: Robert Donald Graham; 20 October 1942 (age 83)
- Occupations: Author and illustrator
- Notable work: Max
- Awards: Smarties Prize (2000); Boston Globe-Horn Book Award (2002); Kate Greenaway Medal (2002)

Robert Donald Graham, better known as Bob Graham (born 20 October 1942), is an Australian author and illustrator of picture books, primarily for very young children.

Graham won the 2002 Kate Greenaway Medal from the British librarians, recognising the year's best-illustrated children's book published in the UK, for the picture book Jethro Byrd, Fairy Child (Walker Books), which he both wrote and illustrated. (He donated the £5000 cash prize to refugees.) The story features a young girl who finds a tiny fairy family "in cement and weeds", contrary to her father's teaching. He also won a 2000 Smarties Prize, ages category 0–5 years, for Max and the 2002 Boston Globe-Horn Book Award, Picture Book, for "Let's Get A Pup!" Said Kate.

For his contribution as a children's illustrator, Graham was Australia nominee for the biennial, international Hans Christian Andersen Medal in 2012.

== Biography ==
Graham was born in Sydney, Australia. He loved drawing and was greatly influenced by comics such as The Phantom and Mandrake.

He studied drawing and painting, went to the UK after graduation, returned to Sydney, and there began his career as an illustrator and designer. Between 1983 and 1995 he lived in Melbourne working as an illustrator for a publishing house, The Five Mile Press. He now lives in the UK and works on a monthly comic-strip for a French magazine, Les Belles Histoires as well as continuing to produce picture books.

In 1982 he illustrated the music and lyrics booklet for Australian Broadcasting Commission's Sing primary school music radio broadcast. A scene from Greetings from Sandy Beach was used as one in a series of Australia Post stamps celebrating the 50th anniversary of the annual Children's Book Council of Australia awards.

WorldCat reports from participating libraries that his most widely held work is How to Heal a Broken Wing, a 36-page picture book about a city boy who rescues an injured bird; published in 2008 by both Walker and its US division Candlewick Press. WorldCat libraries hold editions in Scottish Gaelic, French, Spanish, Catalan, and Chinese.

== Awards and honours ==
Graham's books have received numerous honors and have been listed on several "best of" lists.

Eleven of Graham's books are Junior Library Guild selections: Max (2000), Tales from the Waterhole (2004), How to Heal a Broken Wing (2008), April and Esme, Tooth Fairies (2011), The Silver Button (2014), Vanilla Ice Cream (2014), How the Sun Got to Coco's House (2015), Home in the Rain (2017), The Underhills (2020), Ellie's Dragon (2021), and Maxine (2022).

The Cooperative Children's Book Center at the University of Wisconsin–Madison included nine of Graham's books in their year-end lists of the best books: "Let's Get a Pup" Said Kate (2001), Oscar’s Half Birthday (2005), "The Trouble with Dogs..." Said Dad (2007), How to Heal a Broken Wing (2008), April and Esme: Tooth Fairies (2010), A Bus Called Heaven (2012), The Silver Button (2013),How the Sun Got to Coco's House (2015), and Maxine (2021).

The Association for Library Service to Children (ALSC) has named the following as Notable Children's Books: "Let's Get A Pup,' Said Kate (2002), Oscar's Half Birthday (2006), Dimity Dumpty (2008), April and Esme, Tooth Fairies (2011), Home in the Rain (2018). ALSC also included Max (Reading Rainbow), an adaptation of Graham's Max, a Notable Children's Video in 2003.

School Library Journal named How to Heal a Broken Wing one of the best picture books of 2008.

Two of Graham's books received fanfare from The Horn Book Magazine, meaning they were listed as the magazine's best books of the year. Fanfare books include April and Esme, Tooth Fairies (2010) and Home in the Rain (2017).

Kirkus Reviews named Vanilla Ice Cream one of the best picture books of 2014.

Vanilla Ice Cream was selected by Bank Street College of Education as one of the best books of 2015.

In 2017, Home in the Rain received a blue ribbon from The Bulletin of the Center for Children's Books.

Awards for Graham's writing
Year	Title	Award	Result	Ref.
1986	First there was Frances	CBCA's Children's Book of the Year Award: Picture Book	Commended	
1987	The Wild	CBCA's Children's Book of the Year Award: Picture Book	Shortlist	
1988	Crusher is Coming	CBCA's Children's Book of the Year Award: Picture Book	Winner	
1990	Grandad's Magic	CBCA's Children's Book of the Year Award: Picture Book	Honour	
1991	Greetings from Sandy Beach	CBCA's Children's Book of the Year Award: Picture Book	Winner	
1992	Rose Meets Mr Wintergarten	Human Rights and Equal Opportunity Commission's Human Rights Awards, Children's Literature category	Commended	
1993	Rose Meets Mr Wintergarten	CBCA's Children's Book of the Year Award: Picture Book	Winner	
1993	Rose Meets Mr Wintergarten	Children's Peace Literature Award	Winner	
1997	Queenie the Bantam	Kate Greenaway Medal	Highly commended	(Note: Today there are usually eight books on the Greenaway Medal shortlist. According to CCSU, some runners-up were Commended (from 1959) or Highly Commended (from 1974). There were 99 distinctions of both kinds in 44 years, including two highly commended for 1997.)
1998	Queenie the Bantam	CBCA's Children's Book of the Year Award: Picture Book	Shortlist	
1999	Buffy: An Adventure Story	Nestlé Smarties Book Prize, ages 0–5 years	Silver	
2000	Buffy: An Adventure Story	CBCA's Children's Book of the Year Award: Picture Book	Shortlist	
2000	Buffy: An Adventure Story	Children's Yearly Best Ever Reads (CYBER) Award, Picture Books	Winner	
2000	Max	Nestlé Smarties Book Prize, ages 0–5 years	Winner	
2001	Max	CBCA's Children's Book of the Year Award: Early Childhood	Honour	
2002	Jethro Byrd, Fairy Child	Kate Greenaway Medal	Winner	
2002	"Let's Get A Pup!" Said Kate	Boston Globe-Horn Book Award, Picture Book	Winner	
2002	"Let's Get A Pup!" Said Kate	CBCA's Children's Book of the Year Award: Early Childhood	Winner	
2003	Jethro Byrde, Fairy Child	CBCA's Children's Book of the Year Award: Picture Book	Shortlist	
2005	Aristotle (as illustrator)	Blue Peter Book Award, Best Illustrated Book to Read Aloud	Shortlist	
2005	Tales from the Waterhole	CBCA's Children's Book of the Year Award: Early Childhood	Shortlist	
2006	Oscar’s Half Birthday	Charlotte Zolotow Award	Commend	
2008	"The Trouble with Dogs..." Said Dad.	CBCA's Children's Book of the Year Award: Early Childhood	Shortlist	
2008	"The Trouble with Dogs..." Said Dad.	Charlotte Zolotow Award	Commended	
2009	How to Heal a Broken Wing	CBCA's Children's Book of the Year Award: Early Childhood	Winner	
2009	How to Heal a Broken Wing	Charlotte Zolotow Award	Winner	
2011	April and Esme: Tooth Fairies	Charlotte Zolotow Award	Honor	
2011	April Underhill, Tooth Fairy	Prime Minister's Literary Award, West Australia	Shortlist	
2012	A Bus Called Heaven	CBCA's Children's Book of the Year Award: Picture Book	Winner	
2014	The Silver Button	CBCA's Children's Book of the Year Award: Picture Book	Honour	
2014	The Silver Button	Charlotte Zolotow Award	Commended	
2014	The Silver Button	Irma Black Award	Finalist	
2014	The Silver Button	Prime Minister's Literary Award, Children's Fiction	Winner	
2016	How the Sun Got to Coco's House	Charlotte Zolotow Award	Commended	
2017	Home in the Rain	CBCA's Children's Book of the Year Award: Picture Book	Winner	
2017	Home in the Rain	Prime Minister's Literary Award, Children's Fiction	Winner	
2021	Ellie’s Dragon	CBCA's Children's Book of the Year Award: Picture Book	Shortlist	
2023	Jigsaw: A Puzzle in the Post	CBCA's Children's Book of the Year Award: Early Childhood	Shortlist	
2023	Jigsaw: A Puzzle in the Post	Children's Book Award, Queensland Literary Awards	Shortlist	
