= Matt Ottley =

Australian author, illustrator, composer and visual artist

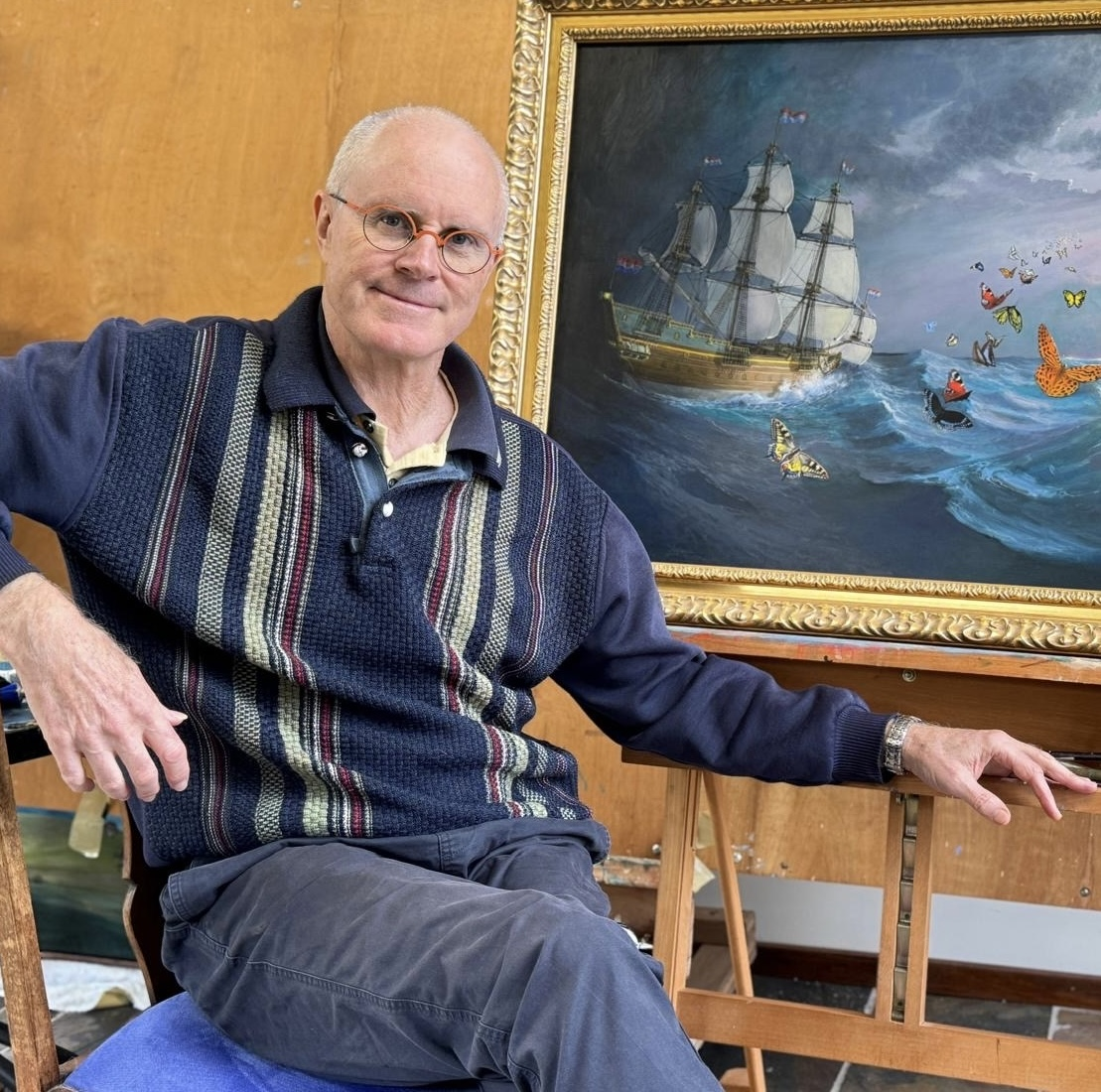
- Ottley in 2026
- Born: 1962 (age 63–64); Highlands of Papua New Guinea
- Occupations: Author, illustrator, composer and visual artist
- Notable work: Requiem for a Beast; The Tree of Ecstasy and Unbearable Sadness
- Website: mattottley.com

Matt Ottley (born 1962) is an Australian author, illustrator, composer and visual artist. He is known for children's and young adult literature and for multimodal projects that combine narrative, illustration and original music. By 2022, he had written or illustrated approximately 40 books.

Ottley's Requiem for a Beast received the 2008 Children's Book Council of Australia Picture Book of the Year Award and the Queensland Premier's Literary Award for Young Adult Book. He illustrated Meg McKinlay's How to Make a Bird, winner of the 2021 CBCA Picture Book of the Year Award and a joint winner in the children's literature category at the 2021 Prime Minister's Literary Awards. His The Tree of Ecstasy and Unbearable Sadness received the 2022 Aurealis Award for Best Graphic Novel/Illustrated Work and the 2023 World Fantasy Special Award—Professional.

== Early life and education ==
Ottley was born in 1962 in the Highlands of Papua New Guinea and grew up in Mount Hagen. His mother was a painter who filled the family home with music and took her children on painting trips. Ottley began making pictures alongside her from about the age of four and later recalled being fascinated by Melanesian music and kundu drums.

His family moved to Australia when he was about 13. After leaving school, he worked as a jackaroo before enrolling at the Julian Ashton Art School. He later studied creative writing and music at the University of Wollongong, where writer Rodney Hall became a mentor. Ottley did not complete a degree.

== Career ==
=== Writing and illustration ===
Much of Ottley's published work has been in children's and young adult literature. A 2022 profile in The Saturday Paper reported that he was best known for approximately 40 books that he had written, illustrated, or both. His multimodal work Requiem for a Beast combines a graphic narrative with an accompanying musical score and incorporates Bundjalung narration and songs. In 2008, it received the Children's Book Council of Australia Picture Book of the Year award and the Queensland Premier's Literary Award for Young Adult Book.

=== Visual art ===
Ottley's original illustrations for Teacup were acquired by the State Library of Western Australia for its Peter Williams Collection of Original Illustrations from Australian Children's Books. The library exhibited the illustrations in 2017 alongside performances of Ottley's score Teacup – One Boy's Story.

Ottley's work was included in Reimagine—the world according to children's books, a survey of Australian children's literature and book illustration presented by Geelong Gallery from 24 March to 27 May 2018. From 14 September to 13 October 2019, Orange Regional Gallery presented Matt Ottley: The Tree of Ecstasy and Unbearable Sadness, an exhibition of works on paper and canvas created for the project.

Original artwork from How to Make a Bird was exhibited at The Literature Centre in Fremantle throughout 2021. In June 2024, YAVA Gallery in Healesville exhibited a selection of artwork from The Tree of Ecstasy and Unbearable Sadness.

From 25 June to 5 August 2026, Ottley presented Ephemera and the Eternal Sky at Art Post Uki as the venue's 70th exhibition. The exhibition explored impermanence, transformation and recurring forms in nature. Tweed Coast Times reported that Ottley had also been the first artist exhibited by Art Post Uki and that the 2026 exhibition marked a renewed focus on painting after several decades working in children's and young adult literature.

The collection of the National Gallery of Victoria includes Ottley's work Friends forever.

=== Music and multimodal works ===
In 2014, Ottley and writer Danny Parker developed The Sound of Picture Books, a live performance project combining picture-book text, illustrations and music. It was subsequently presented through The Literature Centre in Western Australia. The West Australian Symphony Orchestra reported that more than 1,000 Perth students attended workshops for the project in 2014. The program combined narration, projected illustrations and Ottley's original music, performed by a WASO string quintet and a Yamaha pianist.

Ottley's later multimodal work The Tree of Ecstasy and Unbearable Sadness pairs an illustrated narrative with a 50-minute score co-composed with pianist Alf Demasi. Its recording is narrated by Tina Wilson and features the Czech Philharmonic Choir of Brno. The work also includes a 50-minute animated film created from the book's 74 paintings and illustrations. Its symphonic score was recorded by the Brno Philharmonic Orchestra and the Czech Philharmonic Choir of Brno. Ottley has said that the work drew on his experiences of bipolar disorder and psychosis and that he intended it to help reduce stigma surrounding mental illness.

Ottley has described synaesthesia as influencing the relationship between his visual and musical work, explaining that pitched sounds produce colours and shapes in his visual perception.

== Selected works and reception ==
Following its 2008 Children's Book Council of Australia award, Requiem for a Beast prompted public debate about its intended audience, including criticism of its language and depictions of violence. ABC News reported that Kate Eltham, then chief executive of the Queensland Writers Centre, defended the work as a contextual exploration of confronting subjects for older readers. Written by Meg McKinlay and illustrated by Ottley, How to Make a Bird was published by Walker Books Australia. In 2021, it won the Children's Book Council of Australia Picture Book of the Year Award. It was also one of two joint-winning titles in the children's literature category of the 2021 Prime Minister's Literary Awards.

== Awards and recognition ==
- 2008 – Requiem for a Beast was selected for the International Youth Library's White Ravens catalogue.
- 2009 – Home and Away, written by John Marsden and illustrated by Ottley, was named an Honour Book in the Children's Book Council of Australia Picture Book of the Year category and was selected for the International Youth Library's White Ravens catalogue.
- 2014 – Parachute, written by Danny Parker and illustrated by Ottley, was selected for the International Youth Library's White Ravens catalogue.
- 2016 – Teacup, created with writer Rebecca Young, won the Patricia Wrightson Prize for Children's Literature at the New South Wales Premier's Literary Awards.
- 2018 – Teacup was selected for the International Board on Books for Young People Honour List in the Illustration category.
- 2019 – The Incredible Freedom Machines, written by Kirli Saunders and illustrated by Ottley, was shortlisted in the children's literature category of the Prime Minister's Literary Awards.
- 2020 – How to Make a Bird, written by Meg McKinlay and illustrated by Ottley, won the Premier's Prize for Writing for Children at the 2020 Western Australian Premier's Book Awards. The result was announced in August 2021.
- 2022 – The Tree of Ecstasy and Unbearable Sadness won the Aurealis Award for Best Graphic Novel/Illustrated Work. The award was announced in May 2023.
- 2023 – The Tree of Ecstasy and Unbearable Sadness received a special mention in the CrossMedia Projects category of the BolognaRagazzi CrossMedia Awards.
- 2023 – Ottley won the World Fantasy Special Award—Professional for The Tree of Ecstasy and Unbearable Sadness. He was also a finalist in the Artist category.
- 2024 – The International Board on Books for Young People listed Ottley as Australia's nominee for the Hans Christian Andersen Award for Illustration.

== Selected bibliography ==
- Wheatley, Nadia (1999). Luke's Way of Looking. Illustrated by Matt Ottley. Hodder Headline Australia. ISBN 9780733609275.
- Ottley, Matt (2007). Requiem for a Beast. Hachette Livre Australia. ISBN 9780734407962.
- Marsden, John (2008). Home and Away. Illustrated by Matt Ottley. Lothian Books. ISBN 9780734410566.
- Parker, Danny (2013). Parachute. Illustrated by Matt Ottley. Little Hare. ISBN 9781742976778.
- Young, Rebecca (2015). Teacup. Illustrated by Matt Ottley. Scholastic Press.
- Saunders, Kirli (2018). The Incredible Freedom Machines. Illustrated by Matt Ottley. Scholastic Australia. ISBN 9781760275228.
- McKinlay, Meg (2020). How to Make a Bird. Illustrated by Matt Ottley. Walker Books Australia. ISBN 9781925381894.
- Ottley, Matt (2022). The Tree of Ecstasy and Unbearable Sadness. Dirt Lane Press.
- Young, Rebecca (2024). Stickboy. Illustrated by Matt Ottley. Scholastic Press. ISBN 9781742994468.
