= Meg McKinlay =

Australian children's writer

- Education: University of Western Australia
- Occupations: Children's writer; young adult novelist; poet
- Writing career
- Genres: Young adult fiction; children's picture books
- Notable awards: Prime Minister's Literary Awards YA Fiction (2016) & Children's Fiction (2021)

Meg McKinlay is a Western Australian writer. She has written a number of books for children and young adults, including How to Make a Bird and A Single Stone. She has won two Prime Minister's Literary Awards and three Crystal Kite Awards.

== Biography ==
Born Megan McKinlay, she spent her childhood in Bendigo, Victoria. During high school she was an exchange student in Japan. She graduated with a PhD from the University of Western Australia (UWA) in 2001 for her thesis "Gender and cross-cultural analysis: The novels of Tsushima Yûko 1976–1985". She subsequently lectured at UWA in Australian literature, Japanese and creative writing and, as of 2016 was an honorary research associate of that university.

In 2010 she won a residency in Japan and in 2020 she won a May Gibbs Children's Literature Trust Fellowship. As well as writing for children and young adults, she has published one book of poetry, Cleanskin.

McKinlay currently lives in Fremantle, Western Australia.

== Awards ==
- Surface Tension
  - 2012 Davitt Award, Best Young Adult Novel winner
- Ten Tiny Things
  - 2013 Crystal Kite Award, New Zealand/Australia regional winner
- A Single Stone
  - 2015 Aurealis Award for best children's fiction winner
  - 2015 Queensland Literary Awards, Children's Book Award winner
  - 2016 Prime Minister's Literary Awards, Young Adult Fiction winner
- Catch a Falling Star
  - 2019 Western Australian Premier's Book Awards, winner Prize for Writing for Children
  - 2020 Crystal Kite Award New Zealand/Australia regional winner
- How to Make a Bird
  - 2020 Western Australian Premier's Book Awards, winner Prize for Writing for Children
  - 2021Prime Minister's Literary Awards, Children's Fiction winner
  - 2021 Crystal Kite Award, New Zealand/Australia regional winner
  - 2021 Children's Book of the Year Award: Picture Book winner

== Selected works ==
- The Truth about Penguins, co-authored with Mark Jackson, 2010
- Surface Tension, 2011
- Ten Tiny Things, illustrated by Kyle Hughes-Odgers, 2012
- A Single Stone, 2015
- Duck!, illustrated by Nathaniel Eckstrom, 2018
- Catch a Falling Star, 2019
- How to Make a Bird, illustrated by Matt Ottley, 2020
- Bella and the Voyaging House, illustrated by Nicholas Schafer, 2021
