= Ben Martin (footballer, born 1982) =

English professional footballer

Personal information
- Full name: Ben David Martin
- Date of birth: 15 November 1982 (age 43)
- Place of birth: Harpenden, England
- Height: 2.01 m (6 ft 7 in)
- Position: Defender

Youth career
- Barton Rovers

Senior career*
Years	Team	Apps	(Gls)
- Harpenden Town
2003	Aylesbury United	4	(1)
2003–2004	Swindon Town	0	(0)
2003	→ Lincoln City (loan)	0	(0)
2004	→ Farnborough Town (loan)		
2004–2009	St Albans City	99	(10)
2006	→ Staines Town (loan)		
2006–2007	→ Leighton Town (loan)	6	(0)
2007	→ Wealdstone (loan)		
2007	→ Ashford Town (loan)		
2009–2010	Chelmsford City	22	(1)
2010–2011	St Albans City	24	(0)
2011–2013	Welling United	74	(6)
2013–2014	St Albans City	48	(6)
2014–2015	Boreham Wood	11	(0)
2015–2017	St Albans City	54	(6)
2017	Barton Rovers	5	(1)
2017	Welling United	4	(1)
2018	Royston Town	12	(2)
2019	Harpenden Town	2	(0)
2019–2020	Royston Town	22	(4)
- * Club domestic league appearances and goals as of 16:43, 5 September 2020 (UTC)

Ben David Martin (born 15 November 1982) is an English professional footballer who last played as a defender for Royston Town.

== Career ==
Martin initially began his career playing youth football at Barton Rovers. Martin began his senior career at hometown club Harpenden Town, before signing for Aylesbury United in 2003.

In 2003, Martin signed for Swindon Town, following a successful trial. On 15 October 2003, Martin made his first and only appearance for Swindon, playing as a centre forward in a 2–1 defeat in the Football League Trophy against Boston United. At the end of October 2003, Martin was loaned out to Lincoln City for a month, before joining Farnborough Town on loan in 2004.

Following his release from Swindon, Martin joined St Albans City. Over the course of five years at the club, Martin made 99 appearances for St Albans in the league, scoring ten times. Martin was also loaned out to Staines Town, Leighton Town, Wealdstone and Ashford Town during his spell at the club. In 2009, Martin joined Chelmsford City for a season, before returning to St Albans. In 2011, Martin signed for Welling United, making 74 league appearances, before re-signing for St Albans two years later. In the second half of the 2014–15 season, Martin signed for Boreham Wood, making eleven appearances as the club won promotion to the National League. Martin subsequently re-joined St Albans for a fourth spell after his time at Boreham Wood. During the second half of the 2016–17 season, Martin had brief spells with former clubs Barton Rovers and Welling. In 2018, Martin signed for Royston Town, making 13 appearances in all competitions, scoring once, before re-joining Harpenden Town for a two game stint. In 2019, Martin re-signed for Royston.
