= Pat Schmatz =

American author of young adult fiction and middle grade fiction

- Education: Michigan State University; University of California, Berkeley
- Writing career
- Years active: 2001-now
- Genre: young adult fiction
- Notable work: Lizard Radio
- Notable awards: 2010 PEN/Phyllis Naylor Working Writer Fellowship, 2012 Crystal Kite Award, 2015 James Triptee Jr. Award, 2015 Josette Frank Award, 2019 Minnesota Book Award

Pat Schmatz (born ca. 1960) is an American author of young adult fiction and middle grade fiction, best known for their James Tiptree Jr. Award winning novel Lizard Radio. Other of their well-known and award-winning works include Bluefish and The Key to Every Thing.

== Personal life ==
Schmatz grew up in rural Wisconsin. They read The Outsiders by S.E. Hinton in sixth grade, which made them decide that they wanted to start writing for children.

== Selected works ==
Their second novel and first young adult book, Mousetraps, tells the story of a teen dealing with homophobia and bullying after her childhood best friend who suddenly disappeared turns up again. It was published in 2008 by Carolrhoda and a nominee for the Lambda Literary Award in Children's/Young Adult in 2008.

Bluefish, their fourth novel, is about a boy moving to a new town where he lives with his alcoholic grandpa. He is befriended by a difficult and hilarious classmate who helps him see things in a new way. It was published by Candlewick in 2011 and received several starred reviews. Bluefish was a nominee for the Dorothy Canfield Fisher Children's Book Award in 2013 and the California Young Reader Medal for Middle School/Junior High in 2015. It won the Crystal Kite Award in 2012 and the Josette Frank Award in 2015.

Schmatz's fifth novel, Lizard Radio, is set in a world just slightly tilted from our own, where teens have to commit to a gender and "benders" are dealt with harshly. In the novel, a fifteen-year-old bender teen struggles in a culture that tries to define everyone by strict binaries. It was published by Candlewick in 2015. Lizard Radio won the James Tiptree Jr. Award in 2015.

== Bibliography ==
Young adult fiction

- Mousestraps (Carolrhoda, 2008)
- Circle the Truth (Carolrhoda, 2010)
- Lizard Radio (Candlewick, 2015)

Middle grade fiction

- Mrs. Estronsky and the U.F.O. (Little Blue Works, 2001)
- Bluefish (Candlewick, 2011)
- The Key to Every Thing (Candlewick, 2018)

== Awards ==
Won

2012

- Crystal Kite Award for Bluefish (Candlewick, 2011)

2015

- James Tiptree Jr. Award for Lizard Radio (Candlewick, 2015)
- Josette Frank Award for Bluefish (Candlewick, 2011)

2019

- Minnesota Book Award for "The Key to Every Thing."

Nominations

2008

- Lambda Literary Award in Children's/Young Adult for Mousestraps (Carolrhoda, 2008)

2013

- Dorothy Canfield Fisher Children's Book Award for Bluefish (Candlewick, 2011)

2015

- California Young Reader Medal for Middle School/Junior High for Bluefish (Candlewick, 2011)
