= Katrina Germein =

Australian children's writer

- Occupation: Picture book author Early childhood educator
- Genre: Children's literature Picture books
- Years active: 1997–present
- Notable works: Big Rain Coming; My Dad Thinks He's Funny; Bev & Kev; One Little Duck
- Notable awards: Speech Pathology Book of the Year Award (2019); SCBWI Crystal Kite Award (2023)

Katrina Germein is an Australian picture book author and early childhood educator. In 1997, while working in a remote Aboriginal community as a teacher, Germein wrote her first two picture books about her experiences. By 2023 Germein had written over 20 picture books, with some published internationally.

== Awards ==
- Won - Notable 2000 CBCA Book of The Year Award Longlist: Early Childhood for Big Rain Coming
- Won - Notable 2001 CBCA Book of The Year Award Longlist: Early Childhood for Leaving
- Won - Notable 2010 CBCA Book of The Year Award Longlist: Early Childhood for Baby Gets Dressed
- Highly Commended - 2011 Prime Minister's Literary Awards, and shortlisted in the REAL Awards, Koala Awards, Cool Awards & Yabba Awards for My Dad Thinks He's Funny
- Shortlisted - Speech Pathology Book of the Year Awards, 2014 for My Dad Still Thinks He’s Funny and My Mum Says the Strangest Things
- Won - Notable 2016 CBCA Book of The Year Award Longlist: Early Childhood for Thunderstorm Dancing
- Shortlisted - Speech Pathology Book of the Year Awards, 2016 for Baby Dance
- Won - Notable 2018 CBCA Book of the Year Award Longlist: Early Childhood for Great Goal! Marvellous Mark!
- Won - Speech Pathology Book of the Year Award 2019 for Let's Go Strolling by Katrina Germein and Danny Snell
- Shortlisted - Speech Pathology Book of the Year Award 2022 for Before You Were Born
- Shortlisted - Speech Pathology Book of the Year Award 2023 for My Dad Thinks He's a Pirate, Wonderful Wasps and Baby Lou
- Won - SCBWI Crystal Kite Award 2023 and Honour book in CBCA Book of the Year Award: Early Childhood for Bev & Kev
- Won - Notable 2024 CBCA Book of the Year Awards Longlist: Early Childhood for One Little Duck
- Shortlisted - CBCA Book of the Year Awards: Early Childhood, 2024 and Speech Pathology Book of the Year Awards for One Little Duck

== Works ==
Children's books

- Big Rain Coming (1999), illustrated by Bronwyn Bancroft
- Leaving (2000), illustrated by Bronwyn Bancroft
- Baby Gets Dressed (2009), illustrated by Sascha Hutchinson
- My Dad Thinks He's Funny (2010), illustrated by Tom Jellett
- Littledog (2011), illustrated by Tamsin Ainslie
- My Dad Still Thinks He's Funny (2013), illustrated by Tom Jellett
- Somebody's House (2013), illustrated by Anthea Stead
- My Mum Says the Strangest Things (2014), illustrated by Tom Jellett
- Thunderstorm Dancing (2015), illustrated by Judy Watson
- Baby Dance (2016), illustrated by Doris Chang
- Great Goal! Marvellous Mark! (2017), illustrated by Janine Dawson
- Let's Go Strolling (2018), illustrated by Danny Snell
- Shoo You Crocodile! (2019), illustrated by Tom Jellett
- My Dad Thinks He's Super Funny (2020), illustrated by Tom Jellett
- Tell 'Em (2020), written with Rosemary Sullivan and children from Manyallaluk School, illustrated by Karen Briggs
- Before You Were Born (2021), illustrated by Helene Magisson
- Bev & Kev (2022), illustrated by Mandy Foot
- My Dad Thinks He's a Pirate (2022), illustrated by Tom Jellett
- Baby Lou (2022), illustrated by Karen Blair
- One Little Duck (2023), illustrated by Danny Snell
- Little Book Baby (2024), illustrated by Cheryl Orsini
- My Dad Thinks He's a Scream (2024), illustrated by Tom Jellett

Non-Fiction

- Wonderful Wasps (2022), illustrated by Suzanne Houghton
- Fabulous Frogs (2024), illustrated by Suzanne Houghton
