= Patrice Barton =

American illustrator of children's literature

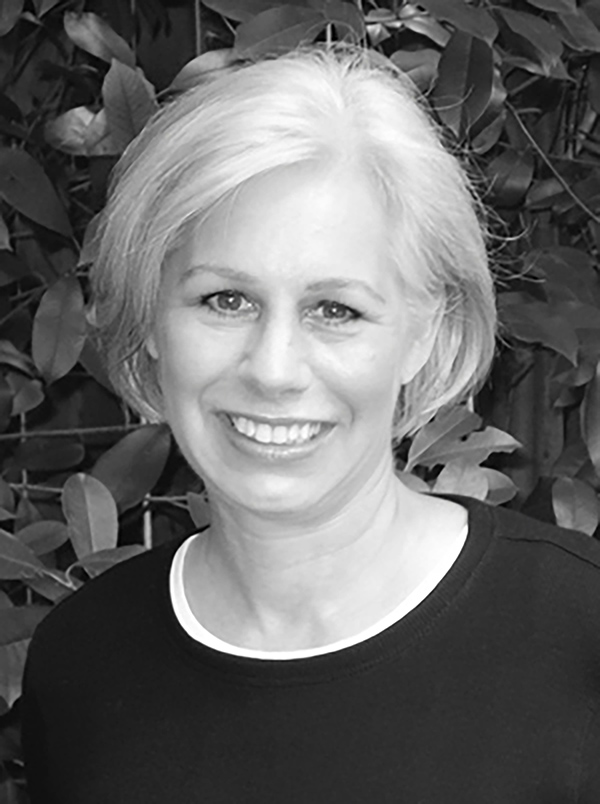
- Occupation: Illustrator
- Notable works: MINE!, The Invisible Boy, I Pledge Allegiance, The Year of the Fortune Cookie

Website
- patricebarton.com

Patrice Barton is an American illustrator of children’s literature. She has created the art for more than 20 books in the picture book and chapter book formats.

Barton earned a Bachelor of Fine Arts in Studio Art at the University of Texas at Austin. Before illustrating for children, she worked as a house painter, a needlepoint designer, a copy shop technician, and a graphic designer. Her first illustration job was for the state of Texas, largely creating courtroom displays; she began freelancing during off-hours drawing for the children’s publishing market. Eventually Barton left that job and has been working for herself since then from her studio in Austin.

Barton’s art for the nearly-wordless 2011 picture book MINE! by Shutta Crum is among her work that has been included in Society of Illustrators Original Art Exhibits. The book's illustrations were praised by writers in both Publishers Weekly and The New York Times.

The Invisible Boy, written by Trudy Ludwig and illustrated by Barton, was included in The Children’s Book Review Best Kids Picture Books of 2013 and BuzzFeed’s 13 Children’s Books That Encourage Kindness Toward Others. The book was also adapted into a musical theater production by the Children’s Theatre of Charlotte, with sets based on Barton’s illustrations. Kirkus Reviews said of Barton’s artwork: “Tender illustrations rendered in glowing hues capture Brian’s isolation.”

== Books ==
=== Picture books ===
- I See You See by Richard Jackson (Caitlyn Dlouhy/Atheneum, 2021)
- Remarkably You by Pat Zietlow Miller (HarperCollins, 2019)
- Quiet Please, Owen McPhee! by Trudy Ludwig (Knopf Books for Young Readers,2018)
- Did You Hear What I Heard? by Kay Winters (Dial Books, 2018)
- Hello Goodbye Dog by Maria Gianferrari (Roaring Brook Press, 2017)
- Bringing the Outside In by Mary McKenna Siddals (Random House, 2016)
- Little Bitty Friends by Elizabeth McPike (Putnam, 2016)
- Uh-Oh! by Shutta Crum (Knopf Books for Young Readers, 2015)
- Little Sleepyhead by Elizabeth McPike (Putnam, 2015)
- I Pledge Allegiance by Pat Mora and Libby Martinez (Knopf Books for Young Readers, 2014)
- The Invisible Boy by Trudy Ludwig (Knopf Books for Young Readers, 2013)
- MINE! by Shutta Crum (published by Knopf Books for Young Readers, 2011)
- I Like Old Clothes by Mary Ann Hoberman (Alfred A. Knopf, 2012)
- Rosie Sprout’s Time to Shine by Allison Wortche (Alfred A. Knopf, 2011)
- Sweet Moon Baby by Karen Henry Clark (Knopf Books for Young Readers, 2010)
- Layla, Queen of Hearts by Glenda Millard (Farrar, Straus and Giroux, 2010)
- The Looking Book by P.K. Hallinan (Ideals Children's Books, 2009)

=== Chapter books ===
- The Year of the Garden by Andrea Cheng (HMH Books for Young Readers, 2017)
- The Year of the Three Sisters by Andrea Cheng (HMH Books for Young Readers, 2015)
- The Year of the Fortune Cookie by Andrea Cheng (HMH Books for Young Readers, 2014)
- The Year of the Baby by Andrea Cheng (HMH Books for Young Readers, 2013)
- The Year of the Baby by Andrea Cheng (HMH Books for Young Readers, 2013)
- Grandma’s Attic Series by Arleta Richardson (David C. Cook, 2010)
- The Naming of Tishkin Silk by Glenda Millard (Farrar, Straus and Giroux, 2009)
