= Benjamin Martin (author) =

American writer

- Born: November 12, 1984 (age 41); Phoenix, Arizona, U.S.
- Occupation: Author
- Writing career
- Genres: Fantasy, Young adult fiction
- Website: www.samuraiawakening.com

Benjamin Martin (born November 12, 1984) author of young adult/urban fantasy novels. He currently lives in Okinawa.

== Bibliography ==
=== Samurai Awakening novels ===
1. Samurai Awakening (Tuttle Publishing 2012)
2. Revenge of the Akuma Clan (Tuttle Publishing 2013)
3. TBA

=== Jitsugen Samurai Diaries shorts ===
1. The Tanner's Daughter (2013)
2. TBA

== Recognition ==
=== Samurai Awakening ===
- 2013 Middle East/Asia/India Crystal Kite Awards
- 2011 Amazon Breakthrough Novel Award semi-finalist

=== Photography ===
- Benjamin won the 2012 Tarumi Kengo prize in the Coral Way Photo Contest
