= Benjamin Marten =

English physician (c. 1690–1752)

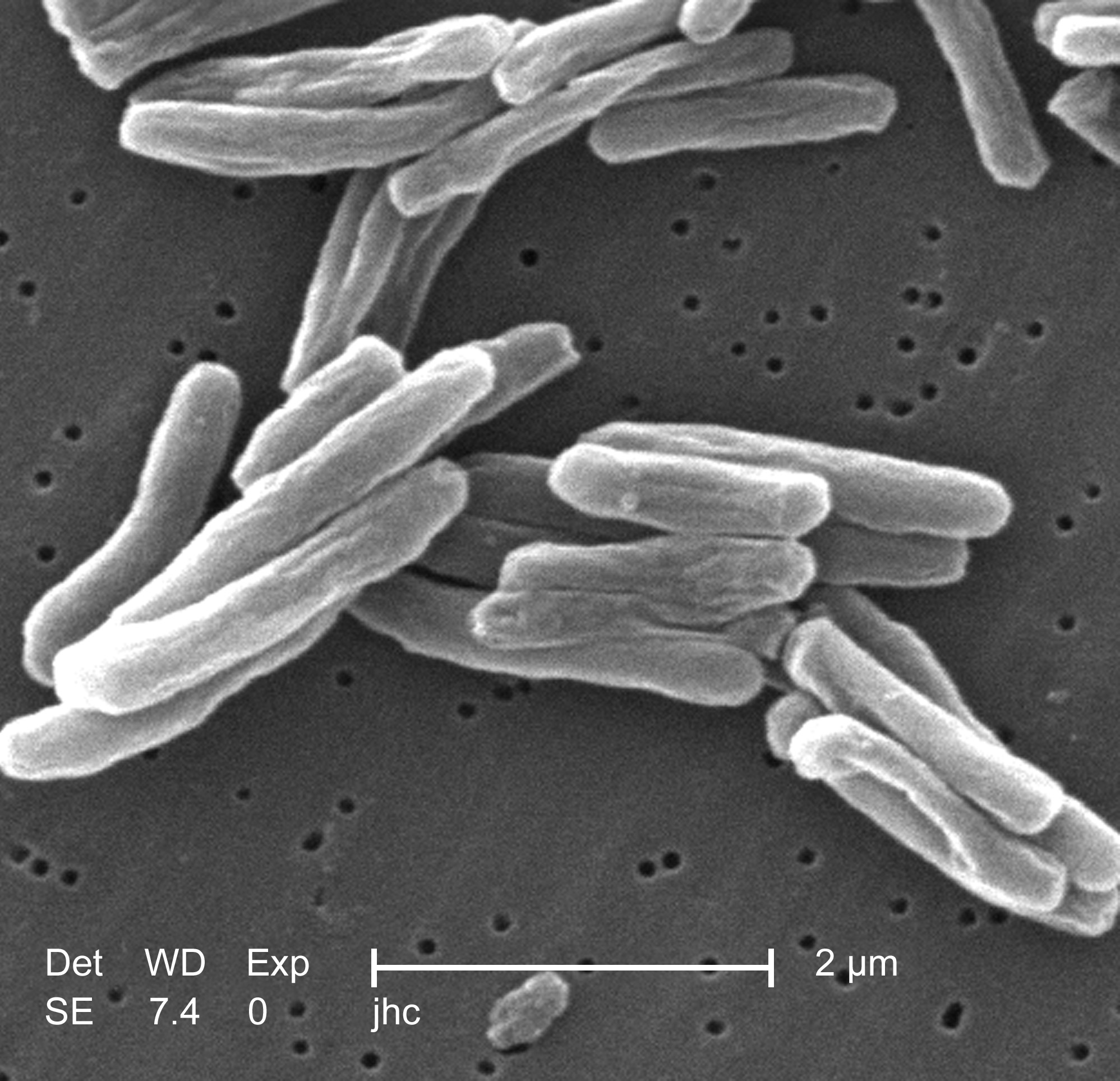
Scanning electron micrograph of Mycobacterium tuberculosis

Benjamin Marten (c.1690–1752) was an English physician from "Theobald's Row" near Red Lyon Square, Holborn, and one of several sons of a tailor.

In 1720 he conjectured in "A New Theory of Consumptions - More Especially a Phthisis or Consumption of the Lungs", that tuberculosis may be caused by "wonderfully minute living creatures" that could lead to the lesions symptomatic of the disease, thereby expressing the theory of contagium vivum or 'living contagion'. He went on to state that "it may be therefore very likely that by a habitual lying in the same bed with a consumptive patient, constantly eating and drinking with him, or by very frequently conversing so nearly as to draw in part of the breath he emits from the lungs, a consumption may be caught by a sound person...I imagine that slightly conversing with consumptive patients is seldom or never sufficient to catch the disease."

Marten's epidemiological insight was prescient. Although Leeuwenhoek had reported seeing bacteria in 1676, he had not believed that his "little animals" caused disease. In 1882 Robert Koch confirmed the agent of tuberculosis. To this day its treatment remains a challenge.

Benjamin Marten probably received an MD degree from the University of Aberdeen in 1717. At that time degrees did not require formal courses or examinations and were routinely conferred after recommendation and on application, and on payment of a prescribed fee. Thus a notice appeared in "Officers and Graduates of University and King's College, Aberdeen" on 9 December 1717 stating that a Benjamin Marten had paid the requisite fee and had been issued with a diploma.

Benjamin's brothers were the surgeon John Marten and the apothecary James Marten. He also had a sister who married a certain tailor named Spooner.

Benjamin married Hannah Fisher, a spinster of St Botolph Aldersgate, on 17 November 1716. The ceremony was recorded in the Marriage Register of St Stephen Walbrook, and stated that the groom was from St Michael Bassinshaw - the 'List of London Marriage Licences' reflects a date of 13 November 1716 for the marriage.
