= Sylvia Chen =

American children's author

- 余愛莉
- Born: Queens, New York City, U.S.
- Education: Columbia University
- Occupation: Children's writer
- Writing career
- Language: English
- Notable works: Tricky Chopsticks (2024); Sparkles for Sunny (2025)
- Website: www.sylviaichen.com

Sylvia Chen (Chinese: 余愛莉) is an American writer of children's picture books. Her books include Tricky Chopsticks (2024) and Sparkles for Sunny: A Lunar New Year Story (2025).

== Early life ==
Chen was born and raised in Queens, New York. She has said she later lived and worked in Boston, San Francisco, Seattle, Paris, and Tokyo, and that she studied statistics at Columbia University after earlier work in science fairs and piano study at Juilliard Pre-College. Before publishing picture books, she worked in software consulting and market research.

== Career ==
Chen has described writing picture books since 2015. She is represented by Alyssa Eisner Henkin of Birch Path Literary.

Her debut picture book, Tricky Chopsticks, illustrated by Fanny Liem, was published by Atheneum Books for Young Readers, an imprint of Simon & Schuster, on March 19, 2024. In a 2022 rights report, Publishers Weekly wrote that Kristie Choi and Reka Simonsen at Atheneum acquired world rights to the book, described as loosely inspired by Chen's childhood, in which a girl uses "STEAM trial and error" to master chopsticks for a family challenge. Kirkus Reviews called it "a funny, relatable tale about the value of creative thinking and persistence."

The book was the Atlantic Division winner of the 2025 Society of Children's Book Writers and Illustrators (SCBWI) Crystal Kite Award. It was the recommended elementary picture book for May 2026 in the National Education Association's Read Across America program.

Her second picture book, Sparkles for Sunny: A Lunar New Year Story, illustrated by Thai My Phuong, was published by Flamingo Books, an imprint of Penguin Random House, on December 2, 2025. Kirkus Reviews described it as "a charming story about honoring traditions while staying true to oneself; Booklist similarly called it "charming and relatable". Publishers Weekly described it as a "heartening" story about a child navigating "seemingly contradictory wishes". The School Library Journal said that the story "will resonate with youngest children everywhere, regardless of a particular holiday or season", and gave a "highly recommended" verdict.

Sparkles for Sunny was the Atlantic Division winner of the 2026 SCBWI Crystal Kite Award, and was a featured book on the January/February 2026 Kids' Indie Next List published by the American Booksellers Association.

Chen is the creator of the social-media series #PBStudyBuddy, which highlights picture books for other writers, teachers, and librarians.

== Selected works ==
- Tricky Chopsticks. Illustrated by Fanny Liem. Atheneum Books for Young Readers. 2024. ISBN 978-1-6659-2149-7.
- Sparkles for Sunny: A Lunar New Year Story. Illustrated by Thai My Phuong. Flamingo Books. 2025. ISBN 978-0-593-69462-6.
