= Libris Award =

Canadian literary award

A Libris Award was a prize for Canadian literature. It was awarded by the Canadian Booksellers Association (CBA) on an annual basis. Nominations were solicited from CBA members, and the three candidates with the most nominations were put to a vote.

There were 13 categories of awards available:

1. Author
2. Fiction Book
3. Non-Fiction Book
4. Specialty Bookseller
5. Campus Bookseller
6. Bookseller
7. Editor
8. Salesperson
9. Distributor
10. Small Press Publisher
11. Publisher
12. Children's Book
13. Young Readers' Book

The CBA Lifetime Achievement Award was also associated with the Libris Awards, although not officially a category.

The awards were presented at the national CBA conference gala. Notable winners include Alice Munro, Mordecai Richler, senator and former United Nations peacekeeping commander Roméo Dallaire, politician and diplomat Stephen Lewis, and environmentalist David Suzuki.

The bookseller awards, meant to recognize "excellence in book retailing", were not necessarily indicative of profit: as a National Post article noted, one Toronto-based bookstore announced that it was closing only a few days after receiving the Specialty Bookseller award.
