= Mike Dumbleton =

- Occupations: Children's writer, literacy consultant
- Writing career
- Years active: 1991–present
- Genres: Children's literature, picture books
- Notable works: Dial-a-Croc (1991); Passing On (2001); Muddled-up Farm (2003); Cat (2007)
- Notable awards: Federal Minister’s Award for Outstanding Contribution to Improving Literacy (2016)

Mike Dumbleton is an Australian writer of children's books and a literacy consultant. He was granted the Federal Minister’s Award for Outstanding Contribution to Improving Literacy in 2016.

== Biography ==
Dumbleton moved to Australia in 1972, where he worked as a teacher for many years. He published his first children's book, Dial-a-Croc in 1991, In 2006 Dumbleton took up a position teaching in New York, where he remained for nine years before returning to South Australia.

== Awards ==
- Won - Speech Pathology Book of the Year 2003 in Best Speech and/or Sound Awareness Book category for Muddled-up Farm by Mike Dumbleton and Jobi Murphy

== Works ==
=== Children's books ===
- Dial-a-Croc (1991)
- Passing On (2001) "Book of the Year - Early Childhood" shortlist.
- Muddled-up farm (2003) "Best Speech and/or Sound Awareness Book" 2003, Speech Pathology Australia.
- Cat (2007) "Honours - Early Childhood" (2008) Children's Book Council of Australia
- Jump and Shout (2017) "CBCA Notable 2018" and shortlisted for the Speech Pathology Australia Book Awards 2018.
- Digger (2018)

== Productions ==
His picture book Cat, created with illustrator Craig Smith, was produced as a theatrical production by Windmill Performing Arts in 2007 after winning the "‘Picture Book to Performance Project". Cat had previously received an Honours award in the Early Childhood category by the Children's Book Council of Australia in 2008.
