= Phil Cummings =

South Australian children's fiction author

- Born: Port Broughton, South Australia, Australia
- Occupation: Children's author
- Genre: Children's fiction, picture books
- Years active: 1989–present
- Notable works: Goodness Gracious! (1989); Danny Allen Was Here (2007); Boom Bah! (2008); Boy (2017)
- Notable awards: Carclew Fellowship (1998); CBCA Notable Book (2002); Children’s Peace Literature Award (2017)

Phil Cummings is a South Australian children's fiction author. Born in Port Broughton, his first book, "Goodness Gracious", was published in 1989. Since then he has published over 100 children's books.

Two of Cummings' works have been turned into theatrical productions. Windmill Performing Arts produced a production of "Boom Bah!" in 2008, and John Schumann composed a musical version of "Danny Allen was here" for the 2012 Festival of Music.

Cummings collaborated with Glyn Lehmann to write two musicals suitable for primary schools to perform. The first is Arlie Abbstock and the Incredible Cape which can be part of the performing arts curriculum. The second musical focuses on environmental issues entitled One Drop of Rain. In addition Cummings and Lehmann wrote a song for Children's Book Week entitled A Book Will Take You There.

== Awards ==
- Carclew Fellowship, 1998.
- Children's Book Council of Australia Notable Book for Breakaway, 2002.
- Adelaide Festival of Arts Awards for Children's Literature, shortlisted, for "Danny Allen was here", 2008.
- CBCA 2016 Honour Picture Book of the Year for “Ride, Ricardo, Ride!”
- CBCA 2018 Shortlisted Book of the Year : Early Childhood for "Boy"
- "Boy" was the winner of the 2017 Children's Peace Literature Award and chosen for the 2021 International Board of Books for Young people (IBBY) Selection of Outstanding Books for Young People with Disabilities.

== Partial bibliography ==
- Cummings, Phil; Smith, Craig (illustrator). (1989). "Goodness Gracious!" Ashton Scholastic Books Australia. ISBN 978-1-86291-317-2
- Cummings, Phil. (1997). "Angel". Random House Australia. ISBN 0-09-183285-3
- Cummings, Phil. (2000). "Breakaway". Random House Australia. ISBN 0-09-184074-0
- Cummings, Phil. (2002). "Tearaway". Random House Australia. ISBN 1-74-051774-1
- Cummings, Phil. (2007). "Danny Allen Was Here". Pan Macmillan. ISBN 978-0-330-42294-9
- Cummings, Phil. (2008). "Take it Easy, Danny Allen". Pan Macmillan. ISBN 978-0-330-42373-1
- Cummings, Phil; Rycroft, Nina (illustrator). (2008). "Boom Bah!" Working Title Press. ISBN 978-1-921504-08-2
