= Canadian Booksellers Association =

The Canadian Booksellers Association (CBA) was an organization that promoted and advocated for Canadian booksellers, publishers and authors. Its membership was open to bookstore owners and "affiliated stakeholders" like authors and publishers. The organization was created in 1952. The association advocated on behalf of booksellers to the Canadian government, notably questioning potential changes to the national competition policies.

The association was noted for its opposition to online retailer Amazon.com, particularly the company's plans to expand into Canada.

== See also ==
- List of booksellers associations
