= Winter (Marsden novel) =

2000 novel by John Marsden

- First edition
- Author: John Marsden
- Language: English
- Genre: Young adult fiction
- Published: 2000 (Pan Macmillan)
- Publication place: Australia
- Media type: Print
- ISBN: 0-7329-1014-5 (Australia); ISBN 0-330-36270-4 (UK)

Winter is a young adult novel by John Marsden published by Pan Macmillan in 2000. The novel follows 16-year-old Winter, who returns to her family's estate after a long absence and uncovers secrets about the deaths of her parents.

Winter was generally well received, but earned less critical acclaim than some of Marsden's other works, including the Tomorrow series, Letters from the Inside and So Much to Tell You.

Winter was inspired by Marsden's own experience of moving into a rundown house in the country. The descriptions of Winter's house and her efforts to restore it are a real-life description of Marsden's own house, and his own efforts to restore it.

== Plot summary ==
After her parents died in a yacht race when she was four, Winter began living with her mother's half sister and her husband, the Robinsons. Now 16, Winter returns to her parents' home, drawn by a desire to know more about her parents and the home where she spent her early childhood.

Upon arriving at the home, Winter is welcomed by the caretakers of the property, Ralph and Sylvia, who invite Winter to stay in their home, but Winter insists on staying in her parents' house. She finds the home run-down and negotiates with Mr. Carruthers, the manager of the estate and of the trust left to her by her parents, to renovate it. Later, Winter discovers that Ralph and Sylvia have been embezzling money from the family trust and insists that Mr. Carruthers fire Ralph and Sylvia.

Meanwhile, Winter befriends several townspeople, including Matthew Kennedy, a young man from a neighboring farm. She also meets Bruce McGill, an architect who knew her parents well. During her first meeting with Bruce, Winter learns that she has a great-aunt. Bruce organises the renovation of her house and introduces her to his daughter, Jesse, with whom she becomes friends. Jesse encourages Winter to pursue her passion for music by applying for a college singing course.

One day, Sylvia tells Winter that her parents are buried on the property. Winter is surprised that she had never been informed of or taken to visit her parents' graves. At the gravesite, Winter discovers that her parents died 6 months apart, not at the same time as she had been told. Winter questions Mr. Carruthers, who tells her that while her father did indeed die in the yacht race, her mother died in a shooting accident. However, Winter is puzzled by this, as her mother was a skilled shooter.

While visiting her great-aunt, who was reluctant to see her, Winter asks her aunt about her mother's death. During their conversation, Winter remembers that as a child, she had picked up one of her mother's spare guns and shot it playfully, accidentally killing her mother. Her great-aunt had shielded her from this by making it look like an accident.

At the end of the novel, Winter comes to peace with her role in her mother's death and falls in love with her neighbor Matthew Kennedy. She lives in her renoveated family home with Jesse.

== Characters ==
- Winter De Salis - The protagonist of the story, strong-willed Winter was orphaned when she was four and returns to her parents' home to learn about her past.
- Phillip De Salis - Winter's father, who was killed in the Sydney-Hobart yacht race.
- Phyllis De Salis - Winter's mother, who was supposedly killed in a shooting accident, but, as Winter eventually discovers, was killed by four-year-old Winter in a tragic accident involving a loaded gun.
- Rita Harrison - Winter's wealthy great-aunt. She was with Winter the day of the shooting accident where Winter killed her mother. She portrayed the event as an accident to protect Winter.
- Mrs. Stone - Rita Harrison's housekeeper. She was also present on the day of the shooting accident and helped Mrs. Harrison to portray the event as an accident to protect Winter.
- Ralph and Sylvia - Hired to take care of the Warriewood estate They use their position as caretakers for their own profit.
- Matthew Kennedy - A neighbour of Winter's who loves horses and is a very skilled horse rider. Winter eventually falls in love with him.
- Mr. Carruthers - As the supervisor of the Warriewood estate, Mr. Carruthers manages the property and money left to Winter by her parents.
- Dr. Couples - The doctor who saw Phyllis's crime scene.
- Jess McGill - Jess is Winter's friend. They meet through Jess' father Bruce who helps in the renovation of the Warriewood estate. They bond over their love of music, and move into Warriewood as housemates at the end of the novel.

== Reception ==
Winter is sometimes compared to another of Marsden's books, Letters from the Inside because the main characters in both books are strong-willed teenage girls. Many reviews agree that Winter appears stubborn and unreasonable at the start of the book, but that she becomes more likeable as the story progresses. Despite agreeing that the finale is satisfying and gripping, most of these reviews state that it is less surprising than the conclusion in Letters from the Inside.

== Inspiration ==
Marsden describes the inspiration behind Winter in his book Marsden on Marsden: The Story of John Marsden's Bestselling Books. The first source of inspiration was the Tye Estate which he bought in January 1998, which was old and in need of renovation. In Winter, Winter's estate is a description of this house. Many of Winter's activities in the novel are activities that Marsden carried out in his renovation of the Tye Estate, including pulling up blackberry plants and cleaning the gutters. When Marsden acquired the Tye Estate, people told him of the old, beautiful furniture that it used to contain. In Winter, the old, beautiful furniture from Winter's estate has also gone missing. The second source of inspiration for this novel was a short story that Marsden wrote, but never published, about a girl who is trying to uncover the truth about how her mother had died.

Like Marsden's other works So much to Tell You and Letters from the Inside, Winter is in some ways a detective novel. Marsden's love for this genre comes from his passion for Agatha Christie novels. This passion was especially strong during his teenage years.

Marsden also discusses his inspiration for the name of the protagonist: "Winter." He has a natural affinity for poetic names, such as River or Willow. The name "Winter" came from a woman who came to one of the writing courses that he taught. He started writing Winter a few months after meeting her.
