= The Third Day, the Frost =

1995 novel by John Marsden

- First edition
- Author: John Marsden
- Language: English
- Series: Tomorrow series
- Genre: Young adult Action; Adventure novel Invasion literature
- Publisher: Pan Macmillan (Australia)
- Publication date: 1995
- Publication place: Australia
- Media type: Print (hardcover and paperback)
- Pages: 288
- Preceded by: The Dead of the Night
- Followed by: Darkness, Be My Friend

The Third Day, the Frost (also published as A Killing Frost in the U.S. and Canada) is the third book in the Tomorrow series by John Marsden. It is a young adult invasion literature novel, detailing the occupation of Australia by an unnamed foreign power. It continues the story started in Tomorrow, When the War Began and The Dead of the Night. Its title derives from a line in William Shakespeare's play, King Henry VIII "The third day comes a frost, a killing frost..." which also serves as the book's epigraph.

== Plot summary ==
After their successful attack on the officers' houses in Wirrawee and the discovery of the accidental death of their friend Chris, the group recuperates back in the safety of Hell. The group has fallen into a depression and exhibit PTSD symptoms, due to their guerrilla war experience and guilt surrounding Chris's death. Unable to venture out to Wirrawee and the surrounding farmland due to increased colonialist presence and helicopter searches of the area, restlessness begin to set in.

Deciding the need to take further action in the war effort, Lee suggests scoping out Cobbler's Bay; a natural harbour with strong, natural mountain defence, that the enemy uses as a strategic port.

On the journey to Cobbler's the group spot Kevin in work party being used as slave labour on a passing farm. The group hatch a plan for Kevin to escape by faking his death in a dilapidated well. Lee, Homer and Ellie attack a sentry in the process and make the sentry's death look like an accident in the same well.

Kevin brings the group up to date on the happenings of life under the enemy in Wirrawee. He was beaten and accused of blowing up the bridge, until soldiers were able to corroborate his story of looking for food with Corrie. He had not seen Corrie since the night at the hospital. Whilst all of the group's families were alive, living conditions at the Showgrounds had deteriorated as a result of overcrowding and lack of resources. Kevin has also gained knowledge on homemade bombs and explosives.

Whilst surveying the enemy's hold on Cobbler's Bay, the group plans to make explosives using ammonium nitrate sourced from fertiliser and diesel in abandoned farm properties. Using their sheep herding skills, the group are able to cause a distraction. Homer and Ellie are smuggled onto an enemy ship and detonate the explosives. During the escape Ellie is separated from Homer and the rest of the group.

After travelling through bushland injured, famished and pursued by enemy forces, Ellie stumbles upon the rest of the group that had just been taken hostage by soldiers. Ellie uses a gun to kill the soldiers and free her friends.

The group take the soldiers' vehicle and take refuge in an abandoned rural junkyard. They find a radio and manage to contact the New Zealand military, but are informed that whilst they appreciate the groups effort, they are not in a position to help or extract the group from the area. Ellie and Lee's romantic relationship deteriorates. Fi suggests that the group travels to a known campsite, deep in the bushland, to rest. Travelling in the soldiers’ vehicle once more, the group is captured by enemy forces who had increased their efforts to find the group after their attack on the harbour.

Taken to a maximum-security prison, the group is placed in separate cells and interrogated by an incredulous Major Harvey, who survived the attack in the previous book. Homer and Ellie are sentence to death for the crimes as the leaders of the gang and the rest of the group are sentenced to long prison terms. The day before their execution, the New Zealand air force bomb the prison and surrounding regional city, allowing the group to escape. Major Harvey holds Robyn at gunpoint to stop the group from leaving, however, in an act of self-sacrifice, Robyn blows herself and Major Harvey up, using a hand grenade so that her friends can flee.

During the air raid the surviving group members are rescued by an ANZAC helicopter and taken to New Zealand. Though safe, the group reels from the death of their friends, the imprisonment of their families and the state of their country.

The story continues in Darkness, Be My Friend.

== Reception ==
The book was well received and was recognised as a notable book by The Children’s Book Council of Australia in 1996, as well as being shortlisted for both the Australian Booksellers Association Awards BookPeople Book of the Year and the Victorian Premier's Sheaffer Pen Prize for Young Adult Fiction the same year. In 1998 it was the winner of the West Australian Young Readers' Book Award - Older Readers. The Third Day, the Frost also won the COOL Award - Fiction for Older Readers in 1999. In 2004 the book was placed in the YABBA Hall of Fame.

== Cancelled film adaptation ==
In 2010, during post-production on Tomorrow, When the War Began director Stuart Beattie reportedly submitted outlines for two sequels, to be based on The Dead of Night and The Third Day, The Frost. However a deal was never reached for the third film, while plans moved ahead for a second film which went into development hell by early 2013.

== See also ==
- Invasion literature
- Australian literature
