= Tomorrow When the War Began (TV series) =

Australian drama television series

- Genre: Drama; Action; Adventure
- Based on: Tomorrow series by John Marsden
- Directed by: Brendan Maher
- Starring: Molly Daniels; Narek Arman; Jon Prasida; Madeleine Clunies-Ross; Madeleine Madden; Andrew Creer; Fantine Banulski; Keith Purcell
- Opening theme: "Hold On" by Gusto Music feat. D'arcy Madison
- Country of origin: Australia
- Original language: English
- No. of series: 1
- No. of episodes: 6

Production
- Executive producers: Matthew Street; Kim Vecera
- Producers: Michael Boughen; Tony Winley
- Running time: 46 minutes
- Production company: Ambience Entertainment

Original release
- Network: ABC3
- Release: 23 April – 28 May 2016

Tomorrow When the War Began is an Australian drama television series based on the Tomorrow series by John Marsden, produced by Michael Boughen and Tony Winley and executive produced by Matthew Street and Kim Vecera. The series, which consisted of six one-hour episodes, premiered on ABC3 on 23 April 2016, and covered roughly the events of the first novel, Tomorrow, When the War Began.

== Premise ==
Based on the award-winning novels written by John Marsden, Tomorrow When the War Began follows a group of eight teenage friends who find themselves in the middle of an unexpected war in a small country town after returning from a remote camping trip. Cut off from the rest of the world and everyone they knew, they must find their way in the new world, where they are among only a few remaining free Australians, who must learn to defend themselves against the hostile invaders and save their detained families.

== Cast ==
=== Main ===
- Molly Daniels as Eleanor "Ellie" Linton
- Narek Arman as Homer Yannos
- Jon Prasida as Lee Takkam
- Madeleine Clunies-Ross as Fiona "Fi" Maxwell
- Madeleine Madden as Corrie Mackenzie
- Andrew Creer as Kevin Holmes
- Fantine Banulski as Robyn Mathers
- Keith Purcell as Chris Maxwell

=== Recurring ===
- Sibylla Budd as Rachel Maxwell
- Deborah Mailman as Kath Mackenzie
- Alison Bell as Liz Linton
- Richard Young as Jack Linton
- Spencer McLaren as Daniel Maxwell
- Damien Fotiou as George Yannos
- Alfred Nicdao as Umar Takkam
- James Stewart as Colonel Lee
- Robert Rabiah as GDA

== Episodes ==
No.	Title	Directed by	Written by	Original release date	Australian viewers
1	"Episode 1"	Brendan Maher	Blake Ayshford	23 April 2016	120,000
Ellie Linton is an Australian country girl, dealing with her senior year of high school with her friends and family. She plans a trip into the wilderness with her friends, leaving their parents to attend the annual Wirrawee Show. While they enjoy their time in the remote area called "Hell", the group's town and country is invaded by foreign forces, and when the group returns from their vacation, they find their home and town barren and empty. Their parents and fellow townspeople have been captured and kept as prisoners at the local showgrounds. Ellie, Kevin and Corrie investigate the showgrounds but are spotted and chased by armed soldiers. Realising they’re about to be surrounded, Ellie sets fire to a lawnmower which explodes and wounds the soldiers, mortally injuring one of them. They manage to escape, and the group comes to terms with the fact that they are at war. Ellie reflects on her split-second choice to kill in defence of herself and her friends. Her life is drastically changing and the once-clear lines between right and wrong are quickly blurring in the pursuit of survival.
2	"Episode 2"	Brendan Maher	Alice Addison	30 April 2016	63,000
The teenagers have to deal with the consequences of their town and country being invaded. As they flee to avoid capture by soldiers, Lee is shot in the leg and Robyn manages to hide him away while she goes for help. On the other side of the town, Fi visits her house with Homer, where her younger brother, Chris, is captured and taken away with their father. Inside the prison camp, the parents of the teenagers begin to plan an escape, and deny the existence of their children to protect them. However, the Colonel operating the system becomes suspicious of Fi's mother when she denies she has any children, but her husband admits they do. Ellie, Homer and Kevin rescue Lee in a stolen army truck, while Corrie, Fi and Robyn cycle out of town, and the group later reunites. When the injured soldier dies, the army intensifies their search, identifying the names and addresses of the missing group, and soldiers are commanded to pursue and kill them.
3	"Episode 3"	Brendan Maher	Blake Ayshford	7 May 2016	52,000
As the soldiers begin searching the property of every missing teenager, the group is taken by surprise and narrowly misses injury during an explosive firefight. They escape to Hell – unmapped territory where they believe they'll be safe – and start the search for native food to sustain them. Kevin insists on fighting the invasion, Robyn (the pacifist) wants nothing to do with violence, and arguments erupt amongst the rest of the group as to how to face the war. Corrie tells Ellie about wanting to break up with Kevin, but they wrestle with how to do such a thing under the desperate circumstances. The Colonel showers Mrs Maxwell with favours in an attempt to recruit her as a prisoner informant, to which she eventually agrees in return for her family's protection. When Lee discovers from Ellie that his mum has been shot, he flees Hell with a rifle and the Land Rover to discover the truth, and only barely manages to contain his rage against the soldiers. The group, now without a vehicle, head to Homer's property, but discover trucks arriving with soldiers and workers to harvest the fields. Realising only two soldiers are present, the teens rush them, capturing their weapons. Homer's father pleads with them to surrender and not cause any further trouble and Homer is forced to question his loyalty to the group. Releasing the soldiers, the teens flee on motorbikes back to Hell to regroup.
4	"Episode 4"	Brendan Maher	Alice Addison	14 May 2016	44,000
5	"Episode 5"	Brendan Maher	Josh Mapleston	21 May 2016	37,000
6	"Episode 6"	Brendan Maher	Justin Monjo	28 May 2016	38,000

== Production ==
=== Filming ===
The series was shot from 14 September to 13 November 2015. Filming took place in and around Melbourne, on the Barwon Heads Bridge, and in Clunes, Victoria.

=== Promotion ===
On 27 November 2015, ABC released its official line-up of new television series to be broadcast in 2016, which included a short preview for Tomorrow When the War Began. On 1 January 2016, the first full trailer was released for the series. Further teasers and trailers were released in March 2016.

== Broadcast ==
Tomorrow When the War Began was broadcast on ABC3 and distributed in Australia by ABC Commercial. The series was distributed internationally by Annapurna Pictures.

=== Ratings ===
No.	Title	Air date	Overnight ratings	Consolidated ratings		Total viewers	Ref(s)
No.	Title	Air date	Viewers	Viewers	Rank	Total viewers	Ref(s)
1	Episode 1	23 April 2016	120,000	64,000	4	183,000	
2	Episode 2	30 April 2016	63,000	46,000	6	109,000	
3	Episode 3	7 May 2016	52,000	34,000	6	86,000	
4	Episode 4	14 May 2016	44,000	32,000	5	76,000	
5	Episode 5	21 May 2016	37,000	22,000	7	59,000	
6	Episode 6	28 May 2016	38,000	22,000	16	60,000	

== Home media release ==
Tomorrow When the War Began was released on DVD and Blu-ray on 1 June 2016 in Region 4/B.

== See also ==
- Tomorrow, When the War Began (film)
