= Ashleigh Cummings =

Australian actress (born 1992)

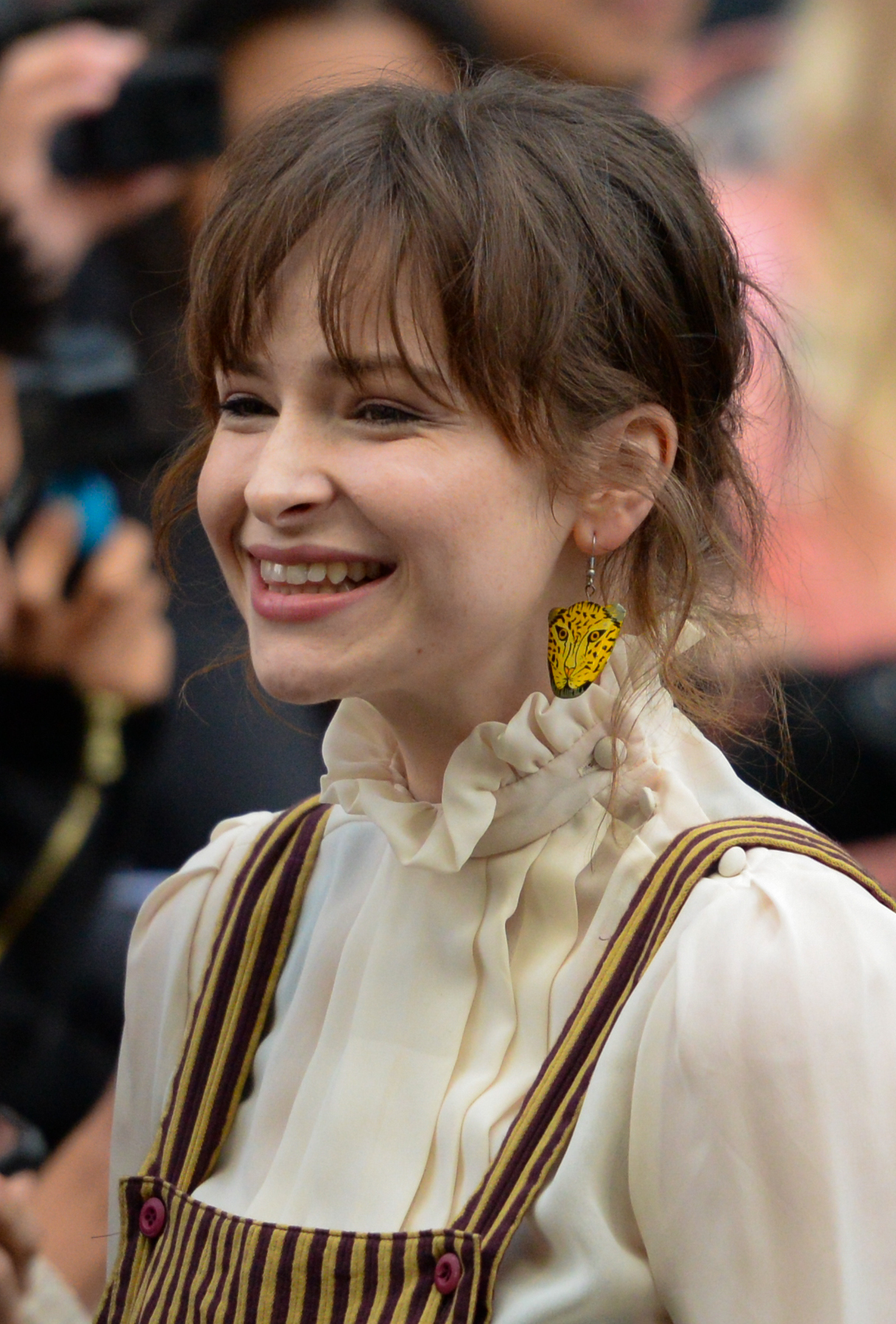
- Cummings at the 2019 Toronto International Film Festival
- Born: 11 November 1992 (age 34); Jeddah, Saudi Arabia
- Citizenship: Australia
- Occupation: Actress
- Years active: 2004–present
- Partner(s): Aaron Jakubenko (2016–present)

Ashleigh Cummings (born 11 November 1992) is an Australian actress. She became known for her role as Robyn Mathers in Tomorrow, When the War Began. The film, based on the book of the same name, earned Cummings a nomination for Best Young Actor at the 2010 Australian Film Institute Awards. Cummings is also known for her roles as Dorothy Williams in ABC1's Miss Fisher's Murder Mysteries, as Debbie Vickers in Puberty Blues, as Vic McQueen in the AMC series NOS4A2, as Abby Conroy in the Prime Video spy action thriller series Citadel, and as Kacey Fitzpatrick in the Peacock crime drama Long Bright River.

== Early life ==
Cummings was born in Jeddah, Saudi Arabia, where her Australian parents lived and worked. She moved to Australia with her family when she was 12 years old. From the age of two, Cummings trained as a ballet dancer. When she was 14 she joined the Brent Street School of Performing Arts, where she learned dance and acting. Cummings then attended Wenona School in North Sydney, where she graduated in 2010. She also attended the film and television school Screenwise. Cummings studied philosophy at university between acting roles.

== Career ==
Cummings appeared as a dancer in Darren Ashton's Razzle Dazzle: A Journey into Dance in 2007. She went on to star as Ally Sheppard in Green Fire Envy a project that was produced by the Participate Film Academy. Cummings' next projects were a role in the television film Dream Life and a guest stint in soap opera Home and Away.

In September 2009, it was announced Cummings had joined the cast of Tomorrow, When the War Began, a film based on the John Marsden book of the same name. Cummings learned how to ride dirt bikes and operate AK-47 assault rifles before filming began. She also sat her Year 11 exams early and missed the first part of Year 12, while shooting the film. Cummings earned a nomination for Best Young Actor at the 2010 Australian Film Institute Awards for her portrayal of Robyn Mathers.

From September 2010, Cummings appeared in the Sydney Theatre Company's production of Our Town. The actress went on to appear in episodes of Rescue Special Ops, Underbelly: Razor and Dance Academy in 2011. She was then cast as Dorothy "Dot" Williams in ABC1's Miss Fisher's Murder Mysteries, a drama series based on Kerry Greenwood's Phryne Fisher historical mysteries. Dorothy is "a conservative working-class Catholic" who becomes Phryne's assistant and companion.

In March 2012, it was announced that Cummings had been cast as Debbie Vickers in the television adaptation of Puberty Blues. Cummings read the novel before her audition and she revealed that she was surprised at the content. Cummings stated: "In terms of the sexual nature of it, I wasn't aware of a lot of that and I've learnt so much (doing this movie)." To prepare for the role of Debbie, Cummings took surfing lessons. Cummings went overseas for three weeks to work as a volunteer in South-East Asia, before she returned to film the second series of Miss Fisher's Murder Mysteries. For her roles in Miss Fisher's Murder Mysteries and Puberty Blues, Cummings received a nomination for Most Popular Actress at the Logie Awards.

Cummings recorded vocals for Dan Webb's debut album Sandstorm, released in 2014. She also starred in Rhys Graham's first feature film Galore as Billie. Cummings received a nomination for Best Performance by a Young Actor at the Film Critics Circle of Australia Awards for her role in Galore. In 2015, Cummings appeared in the television miniseries Gallipoli as Celia. She also stars in the remake of the 1981 film Goodbye Pork Pie. In 2016, Cummings won the Heath Ledger Scholarship awarded by Australians in Film to study at the Stella Adler Studio of Acting and the Ivana Chubbuck Studio in Los Angeles. Cummings has a lead role in Hounds of Love. She was also cast as Cheryl Miller in Westside, the prequel series to Outrageous Fortune.

Cummings plays Pippa in The Goldfinch, a film adaptation of Donna Tartt's novel of the same name. She also appeared in the lead role of Vic McQueen in AMC horror series NOS4A2. In 2023, she began playing Abby Conroy in the American spy action thriller series Citadel for Amazon Prime Video.

== Filmography ==
=== Film ===
Year	Title	Role	Notes
2007	Razzle Dazzle: A Journey into Dance	Dancer	
2008	Green Fire Envy	Ally Sheppard	
2010	Tomorrow, When the War Began	Robyn Mathers	
2013	Galore	Billie	
2013	My Mother Her Daughter	Gabrielle	Short
2013	Greg's First Day	Erica	Short
2014	Snowblind	Paige	Short
2016	Hounds of Love	Vicki Maloney	
2017	Pork Pie	Keira Leigh-Jones	
2019	The Goldfinch	Pippa	
2020	Vide Noir	Lee	
2020	Miss Fisher and the Crypt of Tears	Dot Collins née Williams	
2024	The Beast Within	Imogen	

=== Television ===
Year	Title	Role	Notes
2008	Dream Life	Sal	TV film
2009	Home and Away	Ali Edmonds	Guest role (3 episodes)
2011	Rescue: Special Ops	Britney	"The Intervention"
2011	Underbelly: Razor	Gracie	"Blood Alley"
2012	Dance Academy	Trilby	"Faux Pas De Deux"
2012–2014	Puberty Blues	Debbie Vickers	Main role
2012–2015	Miss Fisher's Murder Mysteries	Dorothy 'Dot' Williams	Main role
2015	Gallipoli	Celia Houghton	TV miniseries
2017–2018	Westside	Cheryl Miller	Regular role (series 3 & 4)
2019–2020	NOS4A2	Vic McQueen	Main role
2023–2026	Citadel	Abby Conroy	Main role
2025	Long Bright River	Kacey Fitzpatrick	Regular role

== Awards and nominations ==
Year	Award	Category	Work	Result
2010	AACTA Awards	Best Young Actor	Tomorrow, When the War Began	Nominated
2013	Logie Awards	Most Popular Actress	Puberty Blues and Miss Fisher's Murder Mysteries	Nominated
2013	AACTA Awards	Best Lead Actress in a Television Drama	Puberty Blues	Nominated
2014	16th St Tropez Antipodes Film Festival	Best Actress (co-winner, with Lily Sullivan)	Galore	Won
2015	Film Critics Circle of Australia	Best Performance by a Young Actor	Galore	Nominated
	AACTA Awards	Best Lead Actress in a Television Drama	Puberty Blues (season 2)	Nominated
2016	Australians in Film	Heath Ledger Scholarship	—N/a	Won
2016	73rd Venice International Film Festival	Best Actress (Venice Days)	Hounds of Love	Won
2018	Australian Film Critics Association Awards	Best Supporting Actress	Hounds of Love	Nominated
	Ozflix Independent Film Awards	Best Actress	Hounds of Love	Nominated
