= Tomorrow, When the War Began (film) =

- Australian theatrical release poster
- Directed by: Stuart Beattie
- Screenplay by: Stuart Beattie
- Based on: Tomorrow, When the War Began by John Marsden
- Produced by: Andrew Mason; Michael Boughen
- Starring: Caitlin Stasey; Rachel Hurd-Wood; Lincoln Lewis; Deniz Akdeniz; Phoebe Tonkin; Chris Pang; Ashleigh Cummings; Andy Ryan; Colin Friels
- Cinematography: Ben Nott
- Edited by: Marcus D'Arcy
- Music by: Johnny Klimek; Reinhold Heil
- Production companies: Ambience Entertainment; Omnilab Media
- Distributed by: Paramount Pictures
- Release date: 2 September 2010
- Running time: 104 minutes
- Country: Australia
- Language: English
- Budget: A$27 million
- Box office: US$16.5 million

Tomorrow, When the War Began is a 2010 Australian action-adventure war drama film written and directed by Stuart Beattie and based on the 1993 novel of the same name (the first in a heptalogy) by John Marsden. The film was produced by Andrew Mason and Michael Boughen. The story follows Ellie Linton, one of seven teenagers waging a guerrilla war against an invading foreign power in their fictional hometown of Wirrawee. The film stars Caitlin Stasey as Ellie Linton and features an ensemble cast including Rachel Hurd-Wood, Lincoln Lewis and Phoebe Tonkin. Production began in September 2009.

Principal photography began on 28 September 2009, and concluded on 6 November 2009; filming took place in the Hunter Region and the Blue Mountains, in New South Wales. The teaser trailer for the film was released on 31 March 2010. The film was released in Australia and New Zealand on 2 September 2010. It was later released on 15 April 2011 in the United Kingdom, and on 24 February 2012 in the United States.

== Plot ==
The film begins with a video log by Ellie Linton. She asks the camera how she can tell their story. She suggests to herself "from the beginning."

Ellie, a high school student in the fictional rural New South Wales town of Wirrawee sets off on a camping trip to a remote valley known as "Hell's Gate", or simply "Hell". She is joined by her close childhood friend Corrie McKenzie, Corrie's boyfriend Kevin Holmes, Ellie's next-door neighbour Homer Yannos, her high school crush Lee Takkam, and her friends Robyn Mathers and Fiona "Fi" Maxwell. During their second night camping, Ellie wakes to a sky full of military aircraft.

Returning to Wirrawee, the group finds their homes abandoned, without power, internet or telephone service. From a hilltop, the group sees that the only lights are at the hospital and the showground. Upon reaching the showground, they find that the townspeople are being detained by a foreign military force. Ellie witnesses a man being shot in the head, and in her horror retreats too quickly, being spotted by a searchlight. They flee but are pursued by soldiers into the backyard of a house. Ellie explodes the fuel tank of a ride-on lawn mower, eliminating the soldiers. In the confusion, Lee and Robyn go missing.

Hiding at Corrie's house, the group witness an RAAF jet fighter being shot down by enemy aircraft. When an enemy helicopter performs a close examination of the house, Homer shoots out its searchlight. The group barely escape as a jet destroys the home.

Ellie and Homer sneak back into town, and find Robyn in her house. Lee has been wounded, and is being treated by Dr. Clements, the local dentist, who informs them that the invading forces are bringing in their equipment from ships moored in Cobbler's Bay, over the Heron Bridge. After a brief skirmish with a pair of armed buggies, Robyn, Homer, Lee and Ellie meet back at Corrie's home. They decide to return to Hell. On the way, they stop at a house and are greeted by school mate Chris, who is incredibly stoned and has no idea that a war is going on.

Ellie and Lee have a deep conversation about their lives, briefly kissing. When Ellie checks on Chris, who is meant to be standing watch, she finds him asleep while a military car narrowly passes by the house. She angrily wakes Chris up, rebuking him for almost getting them killed, and prepares to shoot him, but when her friends witness this, she relents.

They return to Hell, with plans to use it as a secluded hideout. While there, Lee tries to talk to Ellie about their feelings towards each other, but she angrily replies that she is confused and storms off. The group hears a radio transmission revealing that Australia has been invaded by Asian "Coalition Nations", who want Australia's vast natural resources to sustain their own growing populations. The transmission also reveals that Cobbler's Bay is one of only three main ports being used by the invaders. The group then makes plans to destroy the Heron Bridge, disrupting the supply chain.

The group sneaks into Wirrawee. Ellie and Fi steal a petrol tanker, park it near the bridge and wait for the rest of the team to take their positions. After being discovered by guards, they rush to drive the tanker under the bridge. Homer and Lee scare a herd of cattle onto the bridge, forcing the sentries to flee their posts, allowing Ellie to park the tanker under the bridge. They manage to explode the tanker, destroying the bridge, but Corrie is shot as the group escapes.

Despite certain capture, Kevin decides to drive Corrie to the hospital and remain by her side. After those two depart to an unknown future, Ellie breaks down and cries in Lee's arms.

Ellie then finishes her video log, revealing that the group have returned to Hell for their ongoing guerrilla war. She states that they will keep on fighting until the war is over.

== Cast ==
- Caitlin Stasey as Ellie Linton
- Rachel Hurd-Wood as Corrie McKenzie, Ellie's best friend and Kevin's girlfriend.
- Lincoln Lewis as Kevin Holmes, Corrie's boyfriend.
- Deniz Akdeniz as Homer Yannos, Ellie's next-door neighbour
- Phoebe Tonkin as Fiona "Fifi" Maxwell
- Chris Pang as Lee Takkam
- Ashleigh Cummings as Robyn Mathers
- Andy Ryan as Chris Lang
- Colin Friels as Dr. Clement, the Wirrawee dentist
- Don Halbert as Mr. Linton
- Olivia Pigeot as Mrs. Linton
- Stephen Bourke as Police Officer
- Kelly Butler as Mrs. Maxwell
- Julia Yon as Mrs. Lee
- Dane Carson as Mr. Mathers
- Matthew Dale as Mr. Coles
- Gary Quay as Senior Soldier
- Michael Camilleri as Tanker Driver

== Production ==
=== Development ===
In June 2009, Screen Australia announced that it would fund the development of the feature film to be produced based on the novel, to be written and directed by screenwriter Stuart Beattie. The film was released on 2 September 2010. Critical response to the film was mixed and it failed to find an overseas audience.

=== Filming and locations ===
Filming began in the Hunter Region of New South Wales, Australia on 28 September 2009 with early shooting in Dungog with the Dungog Shire Council building as the Police Station located at 198 Dowling Street. You will also find other scenes filmed in the main street, particularly the scene with the Garbage Truck driving around the iconic roundabouts on Dowling Street with the identifyable lamp posts in the centre. Raymond Terrace was chosen as a major location for producing the film as it is "a great country town". Historic King Street, the former main street of the town, was transformed from a normally quiet location into Main Street, Wirrawee. The street began its transformation in September 2009, with set areas including the "Wirrawee Cinema" and the Lee family's Thai restaurant. Filming began in King Street on 21 October 2009 and continued until 27 October 2009. Filming in other locations in the town ended on 6 November 2009. Other filming locations included Maitland, the Blue Mountains and the Luskintyre bridge. The Fox Studios site in Sydney was also used. The explosions of the house and bridge were filmed, scaled-down, at Terrey Hills in northern Sydney.

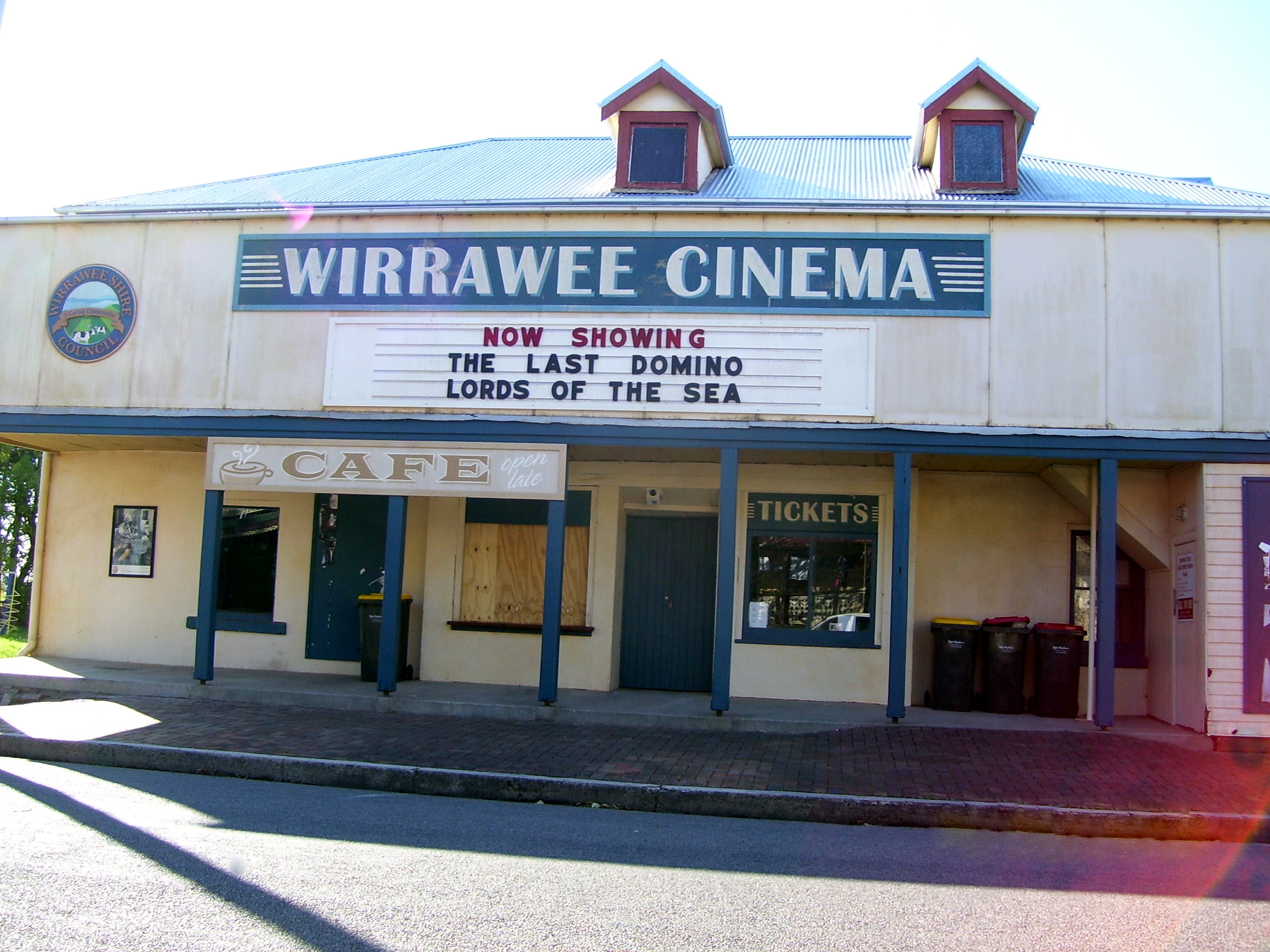
Wirrawee Cinema

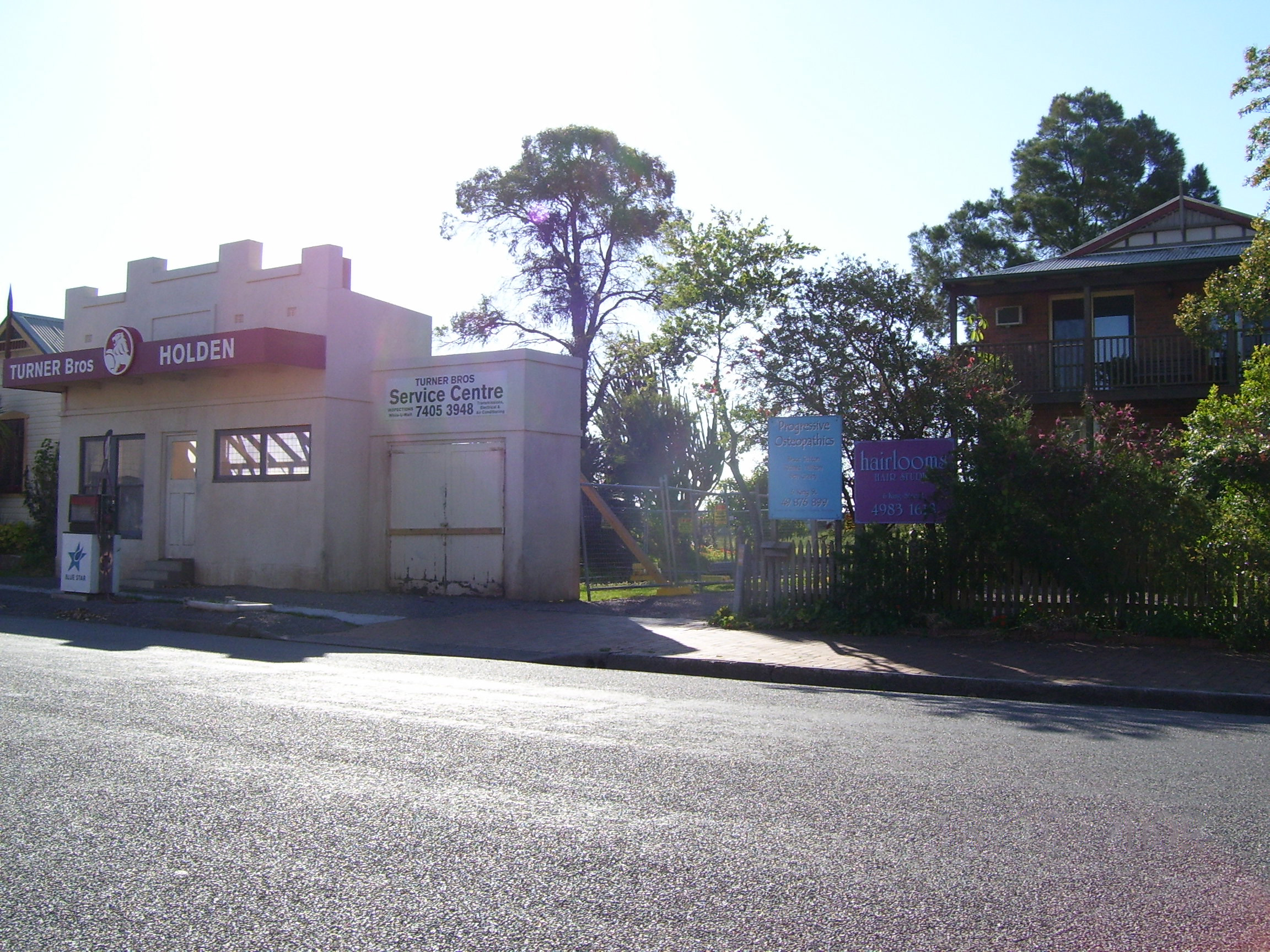
Turner Bros Holden

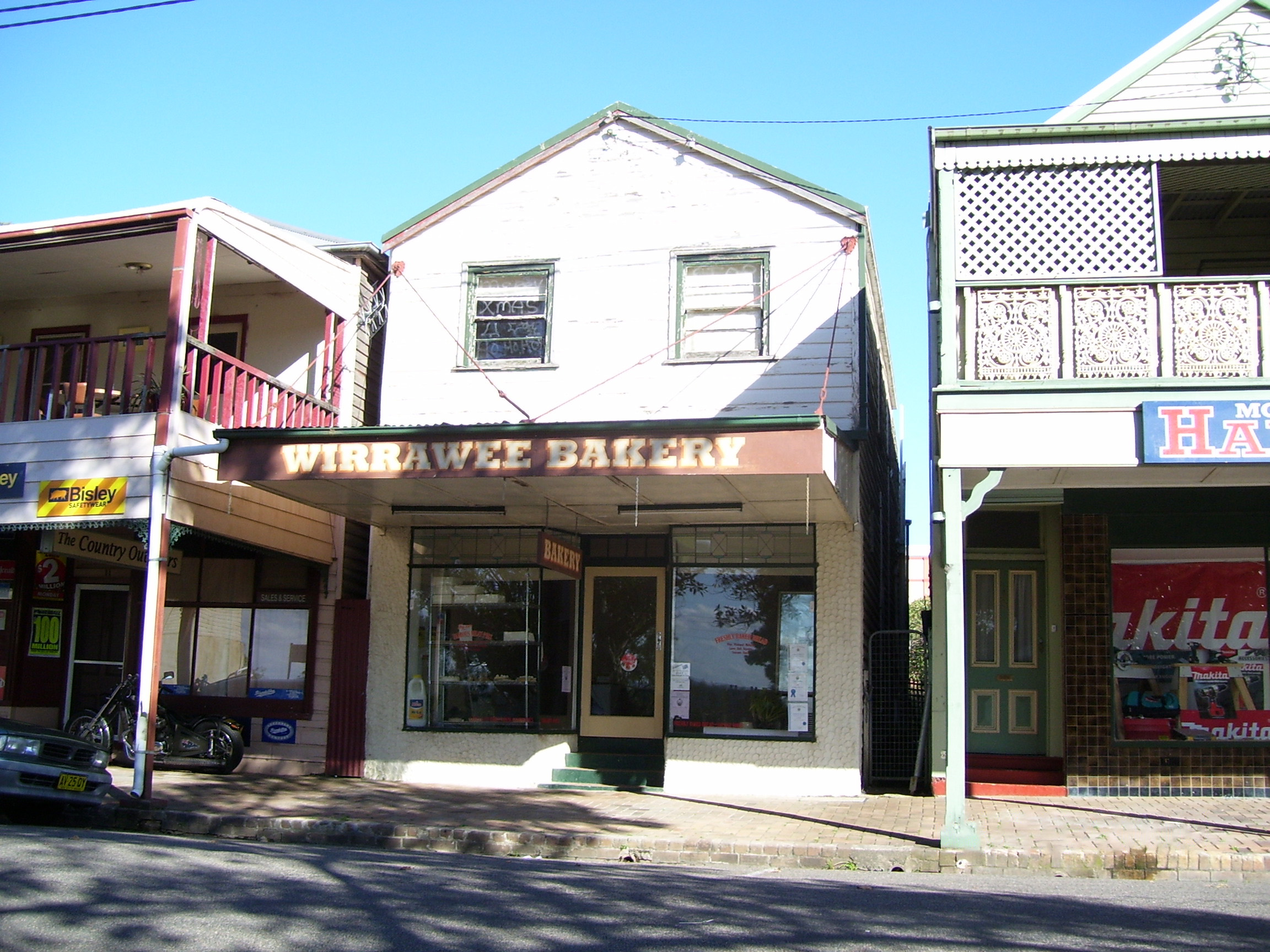
Wirrawee Bakery

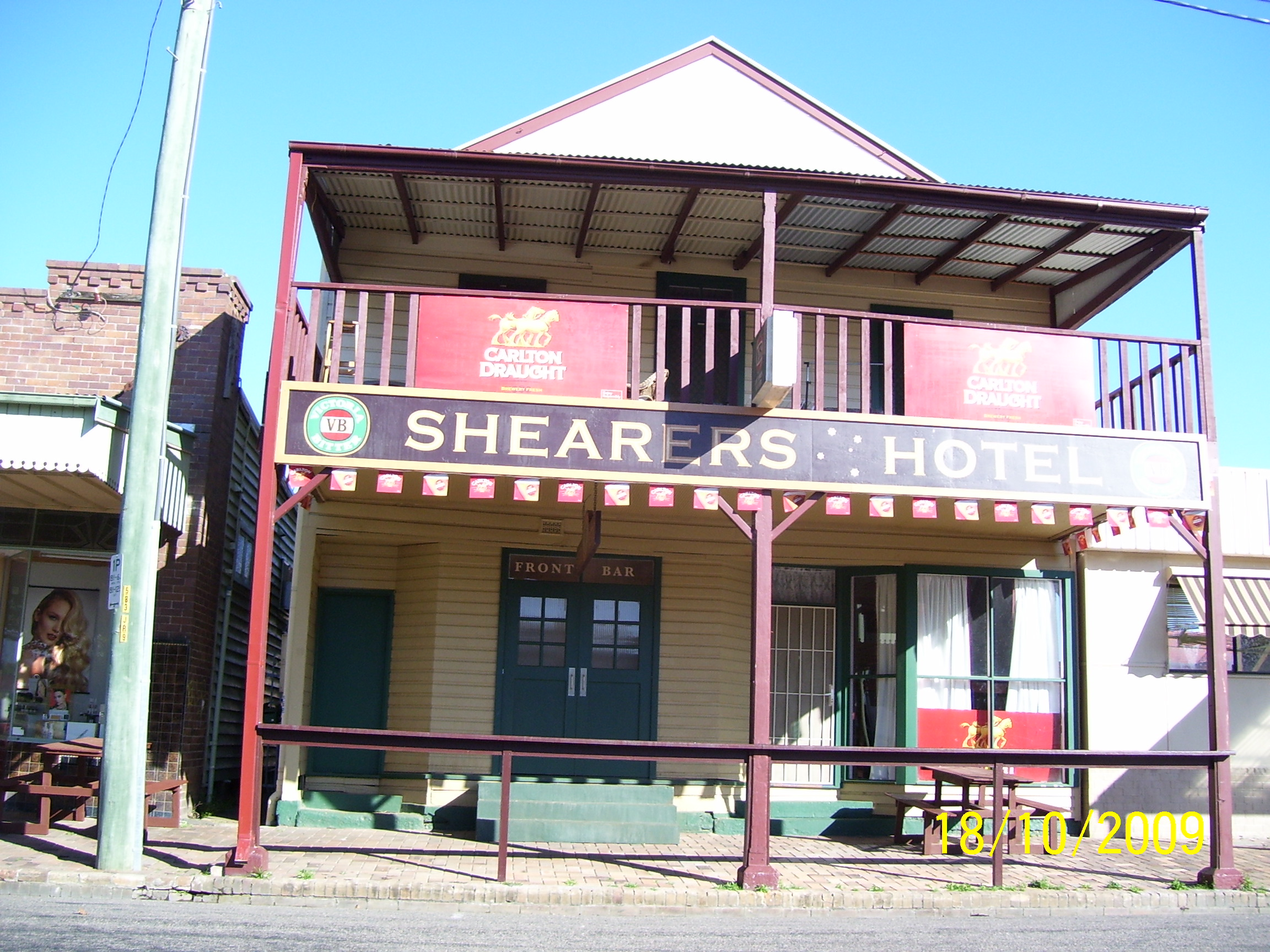
Shearers Hotel

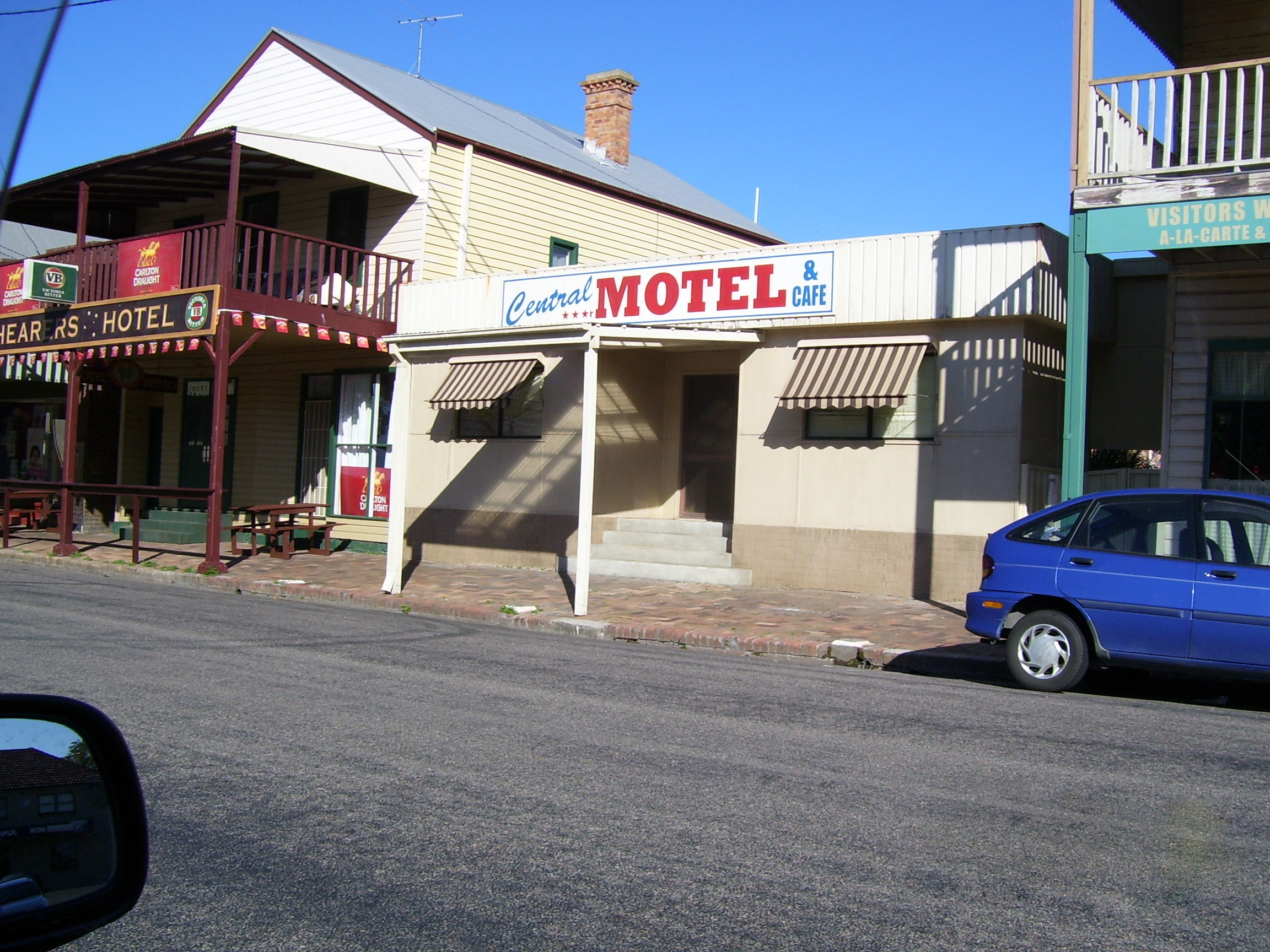
Central Motel & Cafe

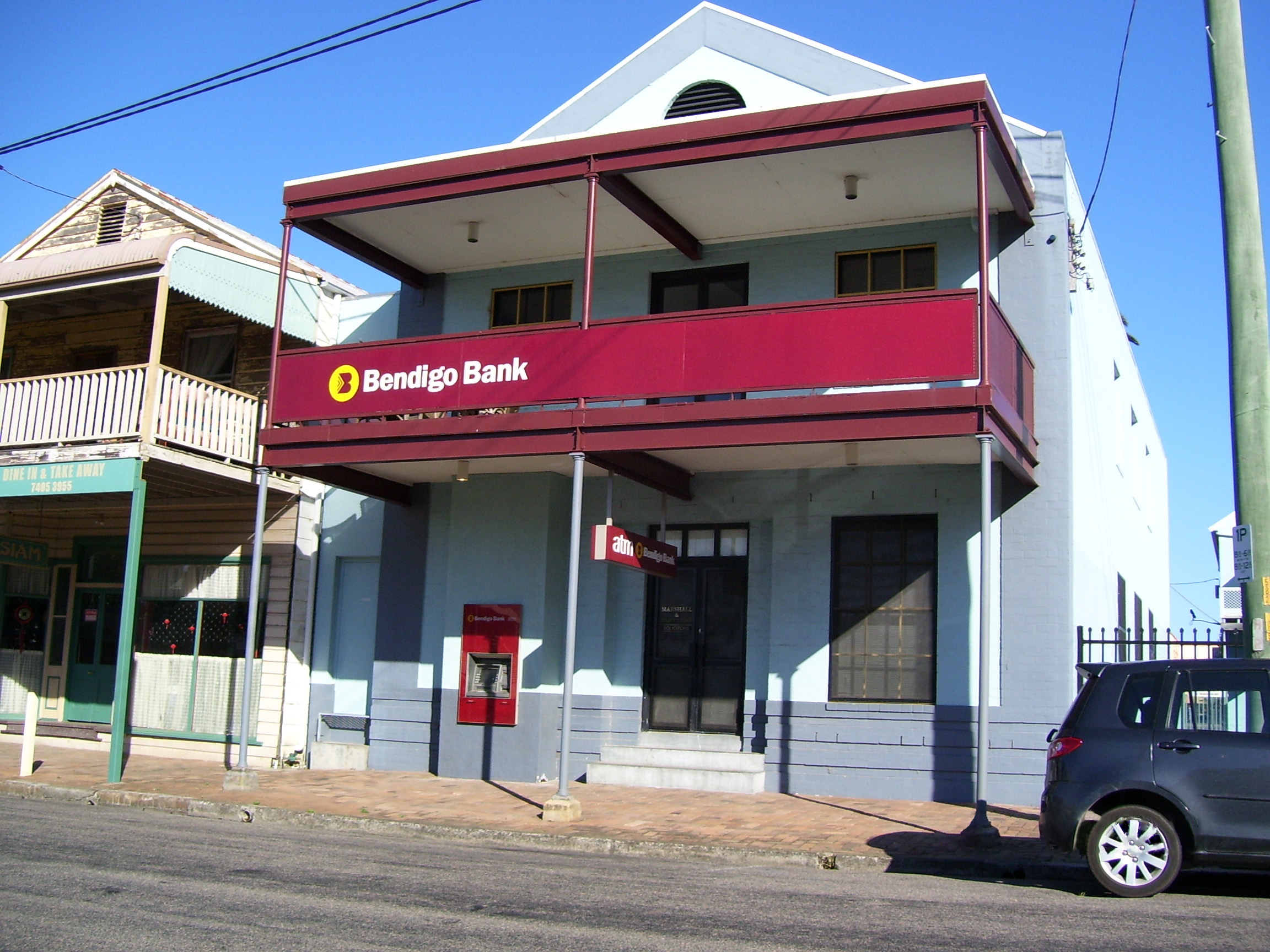
Bendigo Bank

Wirrawee main street sets in King Street, Raymond Terrace

== Reception ==
=== Critical reception ===
Review aggregation website Rotten Tomatoes reports that 63% of critics have given the film a positive review based on 59 reviews, with an average rating of 5.6/10. The site's consensus is that "While the script isn't amazing and the story's race issues linger, this adaptation of John Marsden's book is an exciting, action-heavy adventure that should please fans of the series." On Metacritic the film has a score of 54% based on reviews from five critics, indicating "mixed or average reviews".

Marc Fennell of Triple J wrote that Tomorrow, When the War Began has "patchy acting, fantastic action and some great slivers of humour in a movie that only gives off the faintest whiff of a xenophobic nation terrified of being invaded." Margaret Pomeranz of At the Movies wrote that "Stuart Beattie handles the action well; I think he's less adept at handling the development of character, but I'm sure the numerous fans of the book will be satisfied with the movie." A review by the Australian Special Broadcasting Service was less generous, pointing out parallels to the 1984 film Red Dawn, starring Charlie Sheen and Patrick Swayze. It called the plot weak and the ending a letdown.

=== Box office ===
Despite not coming close to its A$27 million budget, the film was popular at the Australian and New Zealand box office, though internationally it was far less successful. In Australia, the film debuted at No. 1 and made $3.86 million during its first weekend and grossed NZ$358,653 in its No. 1 debut in New Zealand. Within two weeks, the film grossed over $7.7 million in Australia to become the highest-grossing domestic film of 2010. Paramount acquired distribution rights for the UK, Russia, South Africa, Portugal and Scandinavia and said upon its acquisition that they "look forward to bringing this story to international audiences." The film earned over $13.5 million at the Australian box office, but "failed to find an international audience" and earned a total of under $3 million in the rest of the world combined. This included $341,995 in the U.K. and $1,026,705 in New Zealand.

=== Awards ===
Award	Category	Name	Result
2010 Inside Film Awards	Best Feature Film		Won
2010 Inside Film Awards	Best Script	Stuart Beattie	Won
2010 Inside Film Awards	Best Music		Won
2010 Inside Film Awards	Best Actress	Caitlin Stasey	Won
2010 Australian Screen Sound Guild Awards	Soundtrack of the Year		Won
2010 Australian Screen Sound Guild Awards	Best Film Sound Recording	David Lee, Gerry Nucifora, Emma Barham	Won
AACTA Awards	Best Adapted Screenplay	Stuart Beattie	Won
AACTA Awards	Best Sound	Andrew Plain, David Lee, Gethin Creagh, Robert Sullivan	Won
AACTA Awards	Best Film	Andrew Mason, Michael Boughen	Nominated
AACTA Awards	Young Actor	Ashleigh Cummings	Nominated
AACTA Awards	Readers' Choice Award	Andrew Mason, Michael Boughen	Nominated
AACTA Awards	Members' Choice Award	Andrew Mason, Michael Boughen	Nominated
AACTA Awards	Best Editing	Marcus D'Arcy	Nominated
AACTA Awards	Best Production Design	Robert Webb, Michelle McGahey, Damien Drew, Bev Dunn	Nominated
AACTA Awards	Best Visual Effects	Chris Godfrey, Sigi Eimutis, Dave Morely, Tony Cole	Nominated
19th Film Critics Circle of Australia Awards	Best Film	Liz Watts	Nominated
19th Film Critics Circle of Australia Awards	Best Director	Stuart Beattie	Nominated
19th Film Critics Circle of Australia Awards	Best Screenplay	Stuart Beattie	Nominated
19th Film Critics Circle of Australia Awards	Best Cinematography	Ben Nott	Nominated
19th Film Critics Circle of Australia Awards	Best Editor	Marcus D'Arcy	Nominated

== Soundtrack ==
- Steer - Written & Performed by Missy Higgins
- The Honeymoon Is Over - Performed by The Cruel Sea
- Cosmic Egg - Performed by Wolfmother
- Restaurant Piano - Written, Produced & Performed by Guy Gross
- Fader - Performed by The Temper Trap
- Don't You Think It's Time? - Performed by Bob Evans
- Black Hearts (On Fire) - Performed by Jet
- Poison in Your Mind - Written & Performed by Powderfinger
- Tomorrow - Performed by Nic Cester, Davey Lane & Kram
- Flame Trees - Performed by Sarah Blasko
- All Music - Composed by Johnny Klimek and Reinhold Heil

== Home media ==
The DVD and Blu-ray editions of the film were released on 30 December 2010. Both editions were released in widescreen and have additional special features. Some Australian stores released the DVD of the film earlier than expected on 21 December 2010, nine days before the official release date. This was later confirmed by the film's official Facebook page. Special features include John Marsden's view and an alternate ending. Tomorrow, When the War Began now holds the record for the biggest first week sales for an Australian independently produced and financed film after selling almost 105,000 DVD copies since its release on 30 December. The previous record was held by George Miller's animated film Happy Feet, which sold about 95,000 copies in its first week in 2007.

== Adaptations ==
=== Cancelled sequels ===
In September 2010, executive producer Christopher Mapp stated that there may be two sequels, based on the novels The Dead of the Night and The Third Day, The Frost. He also stated that there may be a television series, adapting the remainder of the book series. In December 2010, The Age reported that The Dead of the Night had been green-lit for production, which would commence once the script by Stuart Beattie was completed, with release scheduled for 2012. Filming was due to commence in September 2011. On 20 November 2011, Sydney's Daily Telegraph reported that the sequel had apparently been cancelled. Lincoln Lewis stated "At this stage it doesn't look like it's going to go ahead." In December 2011, the official Tomorrow, When the War Began Facebook page posted that Kieran Darcy-Smith is working on a script for a sequel. In August 2012, it was announced by producers that they hoped for filming to start in early 2013.

Two sequel outlines were pitched to Omnilab Media in 2010 before the first film was completed, however writer and director Stuart Beattie was unable to reach a deal with Omnilab and the project entered development hell. The second film's budget was reportedly planned to be larger than the first film. Talks were made to film the second film in Queensland, Australia.

=== Television adaptation ===
After several years of no word on the sequel, in 2015 it was announced that a television adaptation of the Tomorrow series was then in the works. The cast from the film adaptation did not reprise their roles. The series consists of six episodes and aired on ABC3. Filming took place from 14 September to 13 November 2015 in Melbourne, and premiered on 23 April 2016.

== See also ==
- Tomorrow, When the War Began
- Invasion, U.S.A.
- Red Dawn (1984)
- Battle Beneath the Earth
- Invasion U.S.A.
- Red Dawn
- Invasion literature
