= Voiceworks (magazine) =

Australian literary magazine

Voiceworks is a national quarterly print magazine based in Melbourne, Victoria, featuring work by Australian writers and artists under the age of 25.

== History ==
Express Media, a non-profit media organisation for young writers, was established in the early 1980s. Its newsletter Voiceworks was launched by the then prime minister, Bob Hawke and music journalist Molly Meldrum in 1985 for International Youth Year, to promote the organisation's program of workshops. As Express Australia reduced its other commitments, the newsletter grew. A quarterly, 80-page magazine centred on creative writing, arts, and illustrations was launched as a national publication with volume 1 published in 1988. It later became available online.

From around issue 12 onwards (there is no complete archive), Voiceworks began to be published as a quarterly, 80-page magazine. Then, from issue 98 onwards the format changed to its current 128-page format.

== Production ==
The magazine, published by Express Media, is produced by the editor together with a designer, an intern and a volunteer editorial committee (EdComm), all of whom are also under the age of 25. This committee assists the editor in reading submissions, editing content, proofreading, running launches, and writing feedback for all contributors.

Each issue is subtitled according to a theme determined by the editorial committee a number of issues advance. A theme blurb is written by the EdComm and distributed with calls for submissions, with potential contributors encouraged to contribute themed work.

== Governance and funding ==
The magazine is based in Melbourne with the Wheeler Centre, an initiative of the Government of Victoria as part of Melbourne's designation by UNESCO as a City of Literature in 2008.

Express Media's operations and projects are financed by grants from the Federal and state government arts funding bodies Australia Council for the Arts and Arts Victoria and from the private philanthropic fund Copyright Agency Ltd.

The writer John Marsden was until his death in December 2024 Express Media's patron, and in the past provided the prize money for the John Marsden Prize for Young Australian Writers (renamed Hachette Australia Prize for Young Writers in 2020) as well as operational funding.

== People ==
Ryan Paine become editor-in-chief of Voiceworks in early 2006, moving from Adelaide to Melbourne to take up the position. He had had his first story published in the magazine aged 20.

== See also ==
- List of literary magazines
