= Hounds of Love (film) =

2016 film

- Theatrical release poster
- Directed by: Ben Young
- Written by: Ben Young
- Produced by: Melissa Kelly
- Starring: Emma Booth; Ashleigh Cummings; Stephen Curry
- Cinematography: Michael McDermott
- Edited by: Merlin Eden
- Music by: Dan Luscombe
- Distributed by: Label Distribution; Gunpowder & Sky; Arrow Films; UFO
- Release dates: 1 September 2016 (Venice); 1 June 2017 (Australia)
- Running time: 108 minutes
- Country: Australia
- Language: English

Hounds of Love is a 2016 Australian crime thriller film written and directed by Ben Young in his feature directorial debut. The film follows a married couple who kidnap and terrorise a young woman in the suburbs of Perth. It was selected to compete the Venice Days section at the 73rd Venice International Film Festival on 1 September 2016, where Ashleigh Cummings won the Fedeora Award for Best Actress.

== Plot ==
Vicki Maloney, an intelligent and charismatic teenager inwardly struggling with her parents’ recent separation, spends the weekend at her mother's house in outer suburbia. After a heated argument between them, Vicki defiantly sneaks out to attend a party and is lured into the car of a seemingly trustworthy couple, John and Evelyn White.

Vicki soon finds herself held captive at John and Evelyn's house where she is forced into a dark world of violence and domination. With no way to escape and her murder imminent, Vicki realises she must find a way to drive a wedge between them if she is to survive. Vicki tries exploiting Evelyn's desire to see her absent children, unfortunately John's emotional hold over Evelyn is too strong and her efforts to turn them against each other only fuels Evelyn's will to see her die. Broken and tormented, Vicki accepts her fate may soon lie at the bottom of a shallow bush grave.

Vicki's desperate mother Maggie will stop at nothing to find her missing child and enlists the help of her estranged husband Trevor and Vicki's boyfriend Jason. When Maggie's search eventually leads her to John and Evelyn's street, she calls out for her daughter in vain. Hearing her, Vicki finds the strength for one last attempt at survival by forcing Evelyn to realise if she ever wants to see her children again, she must break free from John's evil spell. When John attempts to strangle Vicki to death, he is stabbed to death by Evelyn. Vicki escapes from the house and defiantly walks past the knife-wielding Evelyn, who allows Vicki to pass. Driving away, Maggie sees the bloodied Vicki in her rear-view mirror. She stops the car and is reunited with her daughter.

== Cast ==
- Emma Booth as Evelyn White
- Ashleigh Cummings as Vicki Maloney
- Stephen Curry as John White
- Susie Porter as Maggie Maloney
- Damian De Montemas as Trevor Maloney
- Harrison Gilbertson as Jason Farris
- Fletcher Humphrys as Gary

== Reception ==
The film was given a limited theatrical release in June 2017 and was met with critical praise. On review aggregator website Rotten Tomatoes, the film holds an approval rating of 88%, based on 98 reviews, and an average rating of 7.3/10. The website's critical consensus reads, "Smartly constructed and powerfully acted, Hounds of Love satisfies as a psychological thriller with a few nasty surprises — and marks writer-director Ben Young as a promising talent." On Metacritic, the film has a weighted average score of 73 out of 100, based on 18 critics, indicating "generally favourable reviews".

Critics found common ground in their enthusiasm about the psychological component to the horror depicted, as well as various technical aspects, particularly the cinematography and direction.

=== Accolades ===
Award	Category	Subject	Result
AACTA Awards (7th)	Best Film	Melissa Kelly	Nominated
AACTA Awards (7th)	Best Direction	Ben Young	Nominated
AACTA Awards (7th)	Best Original Screenplay	Ben Young	Nominated
AACTA Awards (7th)	Best Actor	Stephen Curry	Nominated
AACTA Awards (7th)	Best Actress	Emma Booth	Won
AACTA Awards (7th)	Best Supporting Actress	Susie Porter	Nominated
AACTA Awards (7th)	Best Cinematography	Michael McDermott	Nominated
AACTA Awards (7th)	Best Editing	Merlin Eden	Nominated
AACTA Awards (7th)	Best Hair and Makeup	Hayley Atherton	Nominated
AACTA Awards (7th)	Best Hair and Makeup	Kate Anderson	Nominated
ACS Award	WA/ SA Division Awards	Michael McDermott	Won
ADG Award	Best Direction in a Feature Film	Ben Young	Nominated
AFCA Awards	Best Film	Melissa Kelly	Won
AFCA Awards	Best Director	Ben Young	Nominated
AFCA Awards	Best Screenplay	Ben Young	Nominated
AFCA Awards	Best Actor	Stephen Curry	Nominated
AFCA Awards	Best Actress	Emma Booth	Won
AFCA Awards	Best Supporting Actress	Ashleigh Cummings	Nominated
ASE Award	Best Editing in a Feature Film	Merlin Eden	Nominated
ATOM Award	Best Feature Film	Melissa Kelly and Ben Young	Won
AWGIE Award	Best Original Feature Film Screenplay	Ben Young	Nominated
Boston Underground Film Festival	Audience Award for Best Feature	Ben Young	Nominated
Brussels Film Festival	Grand Prix for Best Director	Ben Young	Won
Brussels Film Festival	Grand Prix for Best Actress	Emma Booth	Won
FCCA Awards	Best Film	Melissa Kelly	Nominated
FCCA Awards	Best Screenplay	Ben Young	Nominated
FCCA Awards	Best Actor	Stephen Curry	Won
FCCA Awards	Best Actress	Emma Booth	Won
FCCA Awards	Best Actress - Supporting Role	Susie Porter	Won
FCCA Awards	Best Cinematography	Michael McDermott	Nominated
FCCA Awards	Best Editing	Merlin Eden	Nominated
Munich Film Festival	CineVision Award for Best Film by an Emerging Director	Ben Young	Nominated
Overlook Film Festival	Best Film and Audience Award	Ben Young and Melissa Kelly	Won
Screen Producers Australia	Best Feature Film	Melissa Kelly	Nominated
Transilvania International Film Festival	Transilvania Trophy for Best Film	Melissa Kelly and Ben Young	Nominated
Venice Film Festival	Fedeora Award for Best Actress in a Debut Film (Venice Days)	Ashleigh Cummings	Won
