= Will Kostakis =

Australian author and journalist

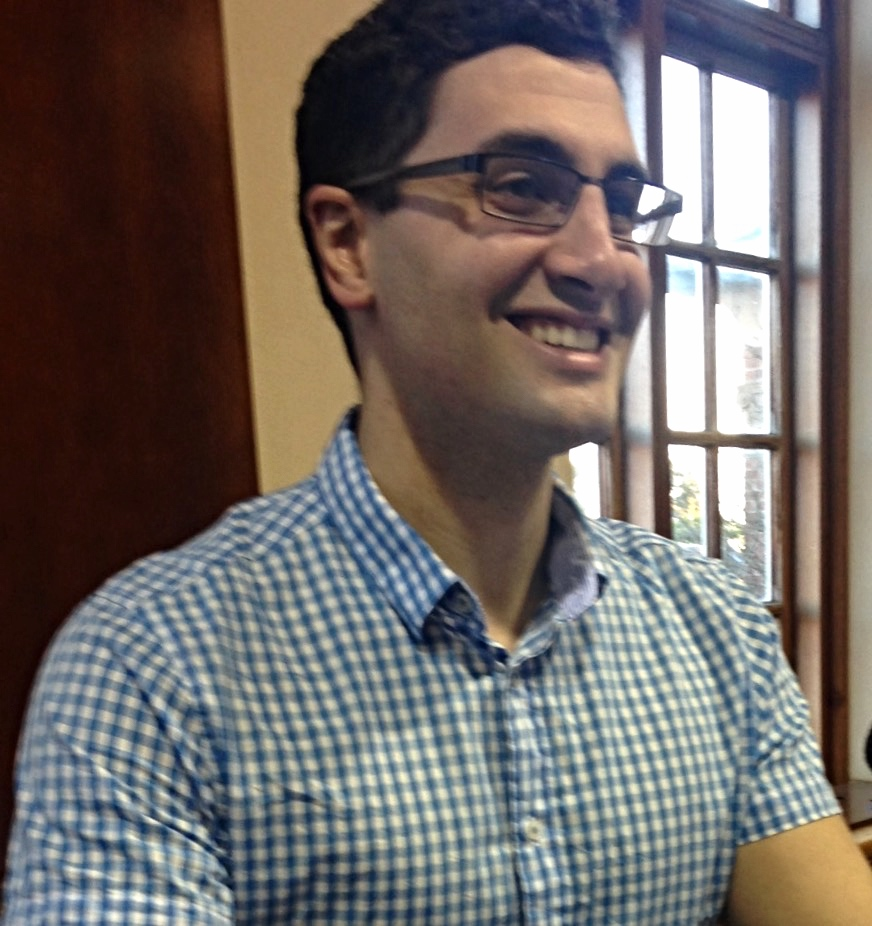
- Will Kostakis in July 2017
- Born: William Kostakis
- Education: Newington College; Sydney University
- Occupation: Novelist
- Writing career
- Notable works: The First Third; We Could Be Something
- Notable awards: Sydney Morning Herald Young Writer of the Year (2005); Inky Awards (2014)
- Website: www.willkostakis.com

William Kostakis is an Australian author and journalist. He is known mainly for young adult fiction, and his 2023 novel We Could Be Something won the 2024 Prime Minister's Literary Award for Young Adult Fiction.

== Early life and education ==
William Kostakis attended Newington College in Stanmore, Sydney. In high school, he won the 2005 Sydney Morning Herald Young Writer of the Year prize for a short story called 'Bing Me', and went on to sign his first book deal in his final year of high school.

He attended Sydney University.

== Career ==
Kostakis scored his first publishing contract at 17, while still completing his final year of high school, Newington College. He began work on a variant of Loathing Lola when he was 11 years old, and continued to refine it.

Loathing Lola, his first novel for young adults, was released in August 2008. The novel was a critical success, dubbed a "kickass debut", "a smart, sharp tale about fame, love and loss" by Dolly magazine, "brilliant" by The Examiner, "a promising debut from a young and talented Australian writer" by Danielle Trabsky at Australian Book Review, "polished" and "extremely funny" by Mike Shuttleworth at the State Library of Victoria, and received many other positive reviews.

== Awards and recognition ==
Kostakis' second novel, The First Third won the 2014 Inky Awards, and was shortlisted for the CBCA Book of the Year: Older Readers and Prime Minister's Literary Awards. His novel The Sidekicks, published in 2016, was shortlisted for the Queensland Literary Awards.

We Could Be Something won the 2024 Prime Minister's Literary Award for Young Adult Fiction. It was also shortlisted in 2024 for the Victorian Premier's Prize for Writing for Young Adults and the Young Adult Book Award, Queensland Literary Awards.

== Other activities ==
On 1 July 2020 Kostakis became a mentor of Express Media's newly renamed Hachette Australia Prize for Young Writers and, along with Hachette head of children's publishing Jeanmarie Morosin, joined the judging panel for the prize.

== Selected works ==
=== Young adult novels ===
- Loathing Lola (2008)
- The First Third (2013)
- The Sidekicks (2016)
- Monuments (2019)
- Rebel Gods (2020)
- The Greatest Hit (2020)
- We Could Be Something (2023)

=== Chapter books ===
- Stuff Happens: Sean (2014)

=== Short stories ===
- "Bing Me" (The Sydney Morning Herald, 2005)
- "An Alternate Life" (The Star Observer, 2016)
- "The Bounce Back" (The Star Observer, 2016)
- "Hatchet" (The Book That Made Me, 2016)
- "I Can See The Ending" (Begin, End, Begin: A #LoveOzYA Anthology, 2017)
