= Checkers (Marsden novel) =

Novel by John Marsden

- First edition
- Author: John Marsden
- Language: English
- Genre: Young adult novel
- Publisher: Pan Macmillan
- Publication date: 1996
- Publication place: Australia
- Media type: Print (Hardback & Paperback)
- Pages: 123 pp
- ISBN: 0-395-85754-6
- OCLC: 38081916
- LC Class: PZ7.M35145 Ch 1998

Checkers is a young adult novel by Australian author John Marsden. It was published in 1996 and 1998 by Houghton Mifflin and in 2000 by Laurel Leaf. It is Marsden's twelfth book.

== Resolution Summary ==
The main plot of Checkers is told in flash back, first-person narration which takes the form of a diary. The author of this diary is a nameless teenage girl, who is a voluntary patient in a psychiatric ward. She refuses to talk about why she's there and does not say a word during her Group therapy sessions.

Before she admits herself into hospital, she lived with a grimly dysfunctional and uncommunicative family of four, whose father was a co-owner of a company named Rider Group which receives a multimillion-dollar business contract. As part of the celebration, the girl's father buys her a pet dog, which she names Checkers, for his odd fur pattern. Soon, however, her father's company begins being attacked by the press, who accuse him and his business partner of gross corruption, allegedly involving the Premier of the State. The Premier continually denies having ever met the girl's father, but these accusations and negative media attention escalate over a period of months. The pressure drives the girl further into isolation and cements the bond she has with Checkers.

Reporters continue to hound the family and the girl is under strict instructions not to discuss any personal matters. However, one day when returning from a walk with Checkers, she strikes up a conversation with a young reporter waiting outside her house. The reporter is intrigued by Checkers, seemingly by his unusual appearance and asks to take a photo of him.

The following day, the newspapers are claiming Checkers is the missing link between the Rider Group and the Premier. Two photos are published; one of Checkers and one of the Premier's dog, and it is revealed The Premier gave Checkers to her father as a gift. The girl returns home from school to discover the story, and finds her father has murdered Checkers with a carving knife.

The events between that day and her admittance to the hospital are never revealed.

At the end of the novel, the girl seems to have resigned herself to being in hospital forever, and she continues to blame herself for the death of her beloved dog.

== Reviews ==
Publishers Weekly noted: "This determinedly grim novel is less compelling than most of the Australian writer's previous books (Letters from the Inside), even though it shares their angry energy and capacity to shock."
