= Express Media =

Australian literary youth arts organisation

Express Media, formerly Express Australia, is an Australian literary youth arts organisation. It supports young writers and arts managers, and is the publisher of the national quarterly print magazine Voiceworks.

== History ==
Express Media was founded in the early 1980s as Express Australia. During the International Youth Year in 1985, it published the first issue of Voiceworks. Then a newsletter focused on youth and media issues, the publication was launched by Prime Minister Bob Hawke and Molly Meldrum. As Express Australia reduced its other commitments, the newsletter grew. A quarterly, 80-page magazine centred on creative writing, arts, and illustrations was launched as a national publication with volume 1 published in 1988. It later became available online.

Around 2011-2012, the organisation underwent an organisational change, with Joe Toohey becoming general manager. Along with Lefa Singleton Norton, over a period of around three years, the "Buzzcuts" arts review program was redesigned and launched, along with the establishment of a publishing project for novellas called Hologram and a program called "Signal" at the Emerging Writers' Festival. Also during this time the Scribe Non-fiction Prize and Young Writers Innovation Prize were launched; public events known as "Literary Salons" were held; an education program for schools was set up, and an annual Best of Express ebook was published, along with many small or one-off events and projects.

In 2023 Express Media published three print issues of Voiceworks and two new digital publications.

== Description and governance ==
The organisation is registered as a charitable organisation. Young adult fiction writer John Marsden was patron of Express Media until his death in December 2024. Partner organisations have included the Emerging Writers' Festival, Melbourne Writers Festival, Melbourne Fringe Festival, Writers Victoria, SYN FM radio, Scribe Publishing, Hachette, State Library of Victoria, Triple R, RMIT, Australian Poetry, Small Press Network, and the Wheeler Centre.

Express Media presents an annual program of workshops and other projects to generate opportunities and professional development for young writer, editors and artists, providing mentoring and feedback for their work, and also offers various awards.

== Express Media awards ==
=== John Marsden/Hachette Prize ===
The John Marsden Prize for Young Australian Writers was launched in 2005, funded and judged by young adult writer John Marsden. The winning entries were published in Voiceworks, and the writers received a cash prize.

In 2014 Hachette Australia became partner and sponsor of the prize, and it was renamed the John Marsden & Hachette Australia Prize for Young Writers. In 2016, the prizes were awarded at the Melbourne Writers Festival.

On 1 July 2020 the prize was renamed the Hachette Australia Prize for Young Writers, and Will Kostakis took over as mentor of the entrants. Kostakis, along with Hachette head of children's publishing Jeanmarie Morosin, joined the judging panel.

The competition encourages secondary school–aged students to submit works of fiction, creative nonfiction, and poetry. Fifteen shortlisted writers may be mentored by Kostakis and attend a Q&A with him. Winners in each category receive $500, have their work published on the Express Media website, and an acknowledgement printed in Voiceworks.

=== Other awards ===
The Young Writers' Innovation Prize is no longer awarded.

The Scribe Nonfiction Prize was established between 2012 and 2014.

The Outstanding Achievement by a Young Person in the Literary Arts Award was established in 2015.

As of 2023 Express Media also offered:

- Kate Muscat Fellowship
- Catalyse Nonfiction Prize

=== Notable winners ===
In 2015, the inaugural Outstanding Achievement by a Young Person in the Literary Arts Award was jointly awarded to Ellen van Neerven and Chloe Higgins.

== Projects ==
=== Parliament Express ===
Parliament Express is a joint initiative between the Victorian Parliament and Express Media that provides an intensive mentoring and learning program. Members of parliament, press gallery journalists, and parliamentary staff contribute to the program, explaining how the parliament and Australian democracy work. Students write articles about various aspects of governing, which are then published on the parliament website.

=== Other projects ===
Over the years, Express Media has published a number of works related to workshops run by them under the name Express Media Power Workshops, including Green Energy Comix, led by cartoonist and writer Kaz Cooke (1991); Journeys to the point: poetry by young Australians (1994); Tiny epics: short stories and poems by young Australian writers; and Young writers express yourself (sponsored by Arts Victoria).

The Buzzcuts program, established in 1997, gave opportunities to young people to write arts reviews. In 2012, the program extended to Adelaide, where it collaborated with the South Australian Writers' Centre. The program was paused in 2017. Other past programs have included Tracks, Global Express, Hologram, National Young Writers' Month, The Under Age, The New Voices Series, 6x6x6, and Write in Your Face.

Express Media runs mentorship programs, with mentors such as Australian writer Christos Tsiolkas.
