= Letters from the Inside =

1991 novel by John Marsden

- First edition
- Author: John Marsden
- Language: English
- Genre: Young adult novel
- Published: 1991
- Publisher: Pan Macmillan
- Publication place: Australia
- Media type: Print (Hardback & Paperback
- Pages: 160 pp (paperback)
- ISBN: 978-0-440-21951-4

Letters From the Inside is a young adult novel written by Australian author John Marsden. It was first published in 1991.

== Plot summary ==
The story is told in the form of letters exchanged between fifteen-year-old girls, Mandy and Tracey. They begin writing after Tracey places an ad in fictional magazine GDY.

The two girls share information about their lives from school, to family, to relationships. Mandy reveals that her brother is abusive and violent, information which Tracey tries to ignore. It appears to Mandy that Tracey's life is perfect, as she has a wonderful boyfriend, rich and caring parents, and she is close to her siblings. However, inconsistencies start appearing in Tracey's letters, and when Mandy questions her on them, Tracey stops writing. Mandy refuses to give up, and finally Tracey replies with the information that she is in fact in a juvenile detention center, and will be there for a long time. Tracey expects Mandy to no longer want to write to her, but Mandy continues to do so.

Their relationship becomes even deeper now that they are completely honest with each other. Mandy, however, occasionally frustrates Tracey with her naivete as Tracey claims she is not as "nice" as Mandy claims, and becomes angry when Mandy makes a joke about tunneling into her cell and staying with her.

Throughout their letter writing, Tracey seems to get in touch with her "softer" side, which includes writing an essay about her Nanna. She wins an award for the story, and asks Mandy to celebrate for her.

Towards the end of the book, Tracey finally confesses the truth about her family and gives her reason for not wanting to hear about Mandy's brother. Mandy never replies to the letter and never writes again. Tracey continuously writes, getting increasingly worried, especially when her letters are sent back to her with "Return To Sender" on them, not in Mandy's hand writing.

== Characters ==
- Tracey, a young troubled girl, is the protagonist of the book; her letters start the novel off. Tracey lies about her real life at first, but after she realizes she has been caught in her lies, she starts to tell the truth. When Mandy first tells her about her brother, she tried to avoid the whole subject because she wants Mandy's life to be the perfect teenage life. Tracey is 15.
- Mandy is a girl who seems to be lost in the world, but compared to Tracey, her life is well defined. She is the other protagonist of the book. Mandy is afraid of her older brother, and she thinks there is something seriously wrong with him. Desperate to talk with someone about her fears, she turned to Tracey. Mandy is also 15.

== Reception ==
Anita Silvey of Horn Book Magazine in her review of Letters from the Inside wrote: "John Marsden writes another riveting story of young women with much to say and much to escape from."
