= The Dead of Night (novel) =

1994 novel by John Marsden

The Dead of the Night
- First edition
- Author: John Marsden
- Language: English
- Series: Tomorrow series
- Genre: Young adult Action; Adventure novel
- Publisher: Pan Macmillan (Australia)
- Publication date: 1994
- Publication place: Australia
- Media type: Print (hardcover and paperback)
- Pages: 271
- Preceded by: Tomorrow, When the War Began
- Followed by: The Third Day, the Frost

The Dead of the Night, also published as The Dead of Night, is the second book in the Tomorrow series by John Marsden. It is a young adult invasion literature novel, detailing the occupation of Australia by an unnamed foreign power. It continues the story started in Tomorrow, When the War Began. The novel is told in the first person perspective by the main character, a teenage girl named Ellie Linton, who is part of a small band of teenagers waging a guerrilla war on the enemy in their fictional home town of Wirrawee.

== Plot summary ==
In the wake of losing Corrie and Kevin, and not knowing how either of them are faring in enemy territory, the group's morale deteriorates. Homer suggests the group attempt to track down Corrie and Kevin. They release a smoke bomb into the hospital and investigate during the evacuation. They discover that Corrie is comatose and that Kevin was beaten when he arrived.

Fresh from the discovery of what had happened to their friends, the group agrees to make an attack on the convoys on the highway to Cobbler's Bay. While preparing their ambush, the group is surprised by a small patrol. Homer kills one soldier and injures another with a sawed-off shotgun at close quarters before going into shock. A third, and final, soldier panics and flees into the bush away from the highway leaving their pack and rifle behind. Ellie takes charge of the situation, kills the wounded soldier and makes the decision to continue on with the attack. The attack succeeds and the group return to Hell.

They decide that their next course of action should be to investigate the other paths in and out of Hell to determine where they lead. Chris, however, decides not to go and stays behind instead. Their exploration leads them to a group of free Australians called "Harvey's Heroes" led by former school principal and army reservist Major Harvey. He refuses to allow any portion of the group to return to Hell to find Chris. Although Harvey brags about having made several attacks on the enemy, these attacks are revealed to be low-risk acts. The group is invited to spectate as Harvey's Heroes destroy an abandoned tank, but they are led into an enemy ambush and have to flee from the scene. Fi is chased by an enemy soldier. Homer and Ellie ambush and incapacitate the man as he prepares to rape Fi but cannot bring themselves to kill him when they discover that he is a teenager like themselves. Lee arrives and stabs the soldier in the heart, disturbing the others.

They return to Hell to find Chris absent, then head into Wirrawee. The group take refuge in Robyn's music teacher's house, where Ellie and Lee consummate their relationship for the first time. They move on to a church, where they keep watch over some of the early colonists. Here they discover that Major Harvey, presumed dead in the ambush, is now working directly with the enemy. Reeling from this discovery, they arrange to blow up several of the houses.

The attack is successful, but on their way back to Hell they see an overturned vehicle near a dam; further investigation reveals that Chris had overturned the car and died weeks ago. The book ends where it begins, with the group depressed and with low morale.

The story continues in The Third Day, the Frost.

== Reception ==
The book was well received and was recognised as a notable book by The Children’s Book Council of Australia in 1995. It also made Canberra’s own outstanding list in 1998.

== Cancelled film adaptation ==
In December 2010, The Age reported that The Dead of Night had been green-lit for production, which would commence once the script by Stuart Beattie was completed, with release scheduled for 2012. Filming was due to commence in September 2011.

In July 2011 it was reported that the second film had been delayed among discussions of shooting the film on a larger budget, in Queensland, Australia.

On 20 November 2011, Sydney's Daily Telegraph reported that the sequel had apparently been cancelled. Lincoln Lewis stated "At this stage it doesn't look like it's going to go ahead."
