= So Much to Tell You =

Novel by John Marsden

- First edition
- Author: John Marsden
- Language: English
- Genre: Young adult novel
- Publisher: Walter McVitty
- Publication place: Australia
- Media type: Print (Hardback & Paperback
- Pages: 120 pp (paperback)
- ISBN: 0949183121
- OCLC: 56659412
- Followed by: Take My Word for It half sequel

So Much to Tell You is a young adult novel by Australian author John Marsden, first published in 1987. It was his debut book. It was instantly successful in Australia and the US and has since been translated into nine languages and awarded many highly acclaimed literary awards including the Christopher Medal and the Victorian Premier's Award. It was declared the Best Book of the Year by the Children's Book Council, and, accordingly, its author hopes that it will act as a source of inspiration to other teens who have had to overcome trauma and challenges in their lives which have had long-term ramifications.

== Plot summary ==
The book is presented as a diary written by a 14-year-old girl, Marina. Marina was the victim of an incident that is initially unknown to the reader, but we are told she refused to talk to anyone during her long recovery period in hospital, and was sent to Warrington, a girls' boarding school, because nothing else appeared to be working. But even after her arrival, she maintains her silence. Then, one day, her English teacher Mr. Lindell encourages the class to keep journals. Even though Marina is determined not to make use of her diary, she cannot resist writing about some of the seemingly trivial events of her day.

However, the content of her entries becomes more and more revealing over time, and readers can better understand Marina's world: how her friends and teachers create profound and lasting impressions on her psyche. Marina goes from not interacting with others at all, opening up and socialising, and eventually finding non-verbal communication methods. It is revealed throughout the novel, first through subtle clues on her reactions to movies and comments from her classmates before an outright confession that Marina has a scarred face because she was the victim of an incident involving acid, inflicted by her father, who was aiming for her mother. However, as the book continues, Marina's negative feelings towards her father fade away, and by the end of the book, she devises a plan which enables her to see him again. When she speaks for the first time, she speaks her only words for the entire novel: "Hello, Dad... I've got so much to tell you..."

== Main characters ==
=== Students of Warrington ===
There are eight girls that Marina shares a dorm with:

'Marina May Jamison': Marina is the book's main character and narrator. Initially, she is heavily introverted and avoids contact with her fellow students. Also, she has "anorexia of speech". She is known as a mute.

Cathy Gloria Preshill: The closest thing Marina has to a friend for most of the book. She invites Marina over for the holidays. She is tall and thin, and reads things like Illusions. She also enjoys writing poetry, '... writer of poems.'

Sophie Marie Smith: One of the most promiscuous girls in the dorm, Sophie is described as "boyish, pretty," "...bubbly and lively." Sophie is also hopeless at tennis. Marina once saw Sophie saying to herself "I hate you, you off moll, you bitch", although she runs away crying when she sees Marina standing there.

Ann Chloe Maltin: Described by Marina as very nice, pretty, and artistic. She had a clay eagle that Marina broke by accident. Marina also notes that Ann's doona cover was her favourite, a "jigsaw of stars."

Kate Isobel Mandeville: Kate is the loudest girl in the dorm, but has a side to her that no one but Marina knows. She always talks about sex and boys.

Lisa Scarlett Morris: Lisa is tall with lovely blonde hair. She is very Nordic-looking. Lisa has a slight mark on one cheek from a skiing accident. She is strong and quiet but still popular and seems like nothing can hurt her. Marina sees her crying violently on her bed when no one else is around but doesn't find out why.

Tracey Jill McDonald: After Marina, Tracey is the most unpopular girl in the dorm, and is often more malicious to her than the others. Described as quite big and plain who is a 'suck'.

Emma A girl with red hair and braces from Hong Kong who is very nice to Marina.

=== Staff of Warrington ===
Mr Lindell: Marina's English teacher. He invites Marina to stay at his place several times. Marina trusts him the most. He assigns his class the journals to write in.

Mrs Ransome: The school counsellor. Marina sees her at least once a week. She has a son who is out of control.

Mrs Graham: The Housemistress/Year Adviser. Disapproves of Marina's silent state.

Dr Whitely: The Headmistress of Warrington. Marina also mentions that she teaches Divinity.

=== Marina's parents ===
Robyn Jamison: Marina's mother comes across as unsympathetic and impatient for Marina to regain her ability to speak. She also comes across as fake and a selfish woman who only cares about herself. She sends Marina to boarding school supposedly to learn to speak again, but really her mother just wants her out of the way to make room for her new husband. Later in the book, she goes to New York with her new partner whom she refers to in her letters as JJ.

Tony Jamison: Marina's father is a significant character he is always on Marina's mind. Marina is unsure about how to feel about him whether it be anger, grief, or forgiveness. He was sent to prison after he spilled acid on his daughter Marina. The acid was intended for Robyn, his wife.

== Origins of story ==
The book is partially based on a true story. Marina's character is based on a fourteen-year-old girl and a woman named Kay Nesbit, whose face was damaged by a shotgun blast. In addition, the dedication at the beginning of the book identifies a certain John Mazur as the English teacher, Mr Lindell, who gives Marina her diary assignment and is one of the people she places the most trust in.

== So Much to Tell You: The Play ==
A play based on this book was written by the same author, John Marsden, in 1992. According to the author, he has always wanted to put So Much to Tell You on the stage.

== Take My Word for It ==
A half-sequel with the title Take My Word for It was written in 1992, from the point of view of Lisa Morris. It tells Lisa's story over the same period, as well as her observation of Marina, but then expands on this and shows Marina after she visits with her father. The second point of view aids the reader by answering some questions from the first, for example, the cause of Marina's nervous breakdown in early April, and the reason for Lisa's crying earlier.

== Reception ==
It was successful in Australia and the US and has since been translated into nine languages and awarded many highly acclaimed literary awards including the Christopher Medal and the Victorian Premier's Award. It was declared the Best Book of the Year by the Children's Book Council.
