= Tomorrow, When the War Began =

1993 novel by John Marsden

- First edition
- Author: John Marsden
- Cover artist: Helen Halliday
- Language: English
- Series: Tomorrow series
- Genre: Young adult Action; Adventure novel
- Publisher: Pan Macmillan (Australia)
- Publication date: 1993
- Publication place: Australia
- Media type: Print (hardcover and paperback)
- Pages: 286
- Followed by: The Dead of Night

Tomorrow, When the War Began is the first book in the Tomorrow series by John Marsden. It was published in 1993, and is a young adult invasion novel, detailing a high-intensity invasion and occupation of Australia by a foreign power. The novel is told in first person perspective by the main character, a teenage girl named Ellie Linton, who is part of a small band of teenagers waging a guerrilla war on the enemy garrison in their fictional home town of Wirrawee.

Tomorrow, When the War Began was adapted into a feature film of the same name that was released on 2 September 2010 in Australia and New Zealand. It was written and directed by Stuart Beattie, and starred Caitlin Stasey in the role of Ellie Linton. In 2016 it was adapted into a television series.

== Plot summary ==
Ellie Linton goes out camping in the bush for a week with her friends Homer Yannos, Lee Takkam, Kevin Holmes, Corrie Mackenzie, Robyn Mathers, and Fiona Maxwell. They find a way into a large, vegetated sinkhole in a remote area of bush the locals have dubbed "Hell", and camp there. During this time they see large numbers of planes flying through the night without lights, and though it is mentioned in conversation the following morning, they think little of it, dismissing it as military planes heading back from a demonstration.

When they return to their hometown of Wirrawee (a fictional town located somewhere in rural Victoria) they find that all the people are missing and their pets and livestock are dead or dying. Fearing the worst, they break into three groups to investigate Wirrawee's situation. They discover that Wirrawee was captured as a beachhead for an invasion of Australia by an unidentified force; local citizens are being held captive by the occupiers. Ellie's group is spotted, and pursued by the enemy and, in order to escape, use the fuel tank of a ride-on lawnmower to create an improvised explosive. However, after reuniting with Homer and Fi at a pre-arranged meeting point, they discover Robyn and Lee missing. Homer and Ellie search for them and they are met by Robyn. They discover that Lee has been shot in the leg and is hiding out in the main street of Wirrawee, the centre of the enemy's activity. Ellie and Homer confer with the others and Ellie decides that they should attempt to rescue Lee, using a front-end loader to move and protect him. After a protracted chase that sees several soldiers killed, Lee is successfully rescued and returned to the safety of Hell but not before they discover Chris Lang hiding out in his house after his parents were away on a business trip.

While hiding out in Hell, a romantic relationship forms between Ellie and Lee, Homer falls in love with Fi, while Kevin and Corrie continue a romantic relationship started a few months before the invasion. The teens decide to raid nearby farmhouses, searching for food and other supplies, and then retreat to Hell to establish a base camp for themselves. The group eventually moves toward waging a guerrilla war against the invaders.

Homer explains a plan around taking out the main bridge at Wirrawee which the invaders are using to supply their troops. They all agree and Ellie, Fi, Lee, and Homer steal a petrol tanker and use it to blow up the main bridge out of Wirrawee. However, the plan nearly falls apart when Ellie and Fi are discussing Homer and Lee. Luckily at the last minute they kick into gear and get the tanker to the bridge. Homer and Lee create a distraction with cattle. As the bridge party joins up with the others they discover Corrie has been shot.

The raid is a success as the bridge collapses but Corrie needs medical attention. Kevin decides that he will surrender and hope that the invaders give Corrie medical attention. They set off as the others look to the future.

== Reception ==
Horn Book Magazine said that Tomorrow, When the War Began is "a riveting adventure through which Marsden explores the capacity for evil and the necessity of working together to oppose it." Book Report magazine said that it was "an exciting story of self-discovery and survival."

Between 1993 and 1998, over three million copies of the novel were sold. During this timeframe, Tomorrow, When the War Began was translated into five languages, and was rated as the "4th best loved book" in an Australian survey.

The novel is recommended by the New South Wales Board of Studies as a text to be studied in English classes during Stage 5 (Years 9 and 10). In 1996, the American Library Association (ALA) named Tomorrow, When the War Began as one of the best young adult titles published in America in that year. In 2000, the ALA listed the book as one of the 100 best books for teenage readers published between 1966 and 2000.

In 2000, the Swedish government selected Tomorrow, When the War Began as the book most likely to inspire a love of reading in young people, and financed the printing and distribution of the novel to teenage school students in the country.

In 2013, Tomorrow, When the War Began was voted Australia's favourite Australian book in a poll run by Get Reading!, an annual campaign run by the Australian Government to encourage Australians to read.

== Adaptations ==
The book has been adapted twice.

In June 2009, Screen Australia announced that it would fund the development of the feature film to be produced based on the novel, to be written and directed by screenwriter Stuart Beattie. The film was released on 2 September 2010, but critical response was mixed and it failed to find an overseas audience.

A television adaptation of the Tomorrow series was produced. The series consist of six episodes and aired on ABC3. Filming took place from 14 September to 13 November 2015 in Melbourne, and premiered on 23 April 2016. The first series roughly followed the events of the first book.
