= Tomorrow series =

Series of young adult novels by John Marsden

- Tomorrow, When the War Began's front cover
- Tomorrow, When the War Began (1993); The Dead of the Night (1994); The Third Day, the Frost (1995); Darkness, Be My Friend (1996); Burning for Revenge (1997); The Night is for Hunting (1998); The Other Side of Dawn (1999)
- Author: John Marsden
- Country: Australia
- Language: English
- Genre: Action, Adventure novel
- Publisher: Pan Macmillan (Australia)
- Published: 1993–1999
- Media type: Print (Hardcover & Paperback)
- No. of books: 7
- Followed by: The Ellie Chronicles

The Tomorrow series is a series of seven young adult invasion novels written by Australian writer John Marsden, detailing the invasion and occupation of Australia by a foreign power. The novels are related from the first-person perspective by Ellie Linton, a teenage girl, who is part of a small band of teenagers waging a guerrilla war on the enemy soldiers in the region around their fictional home town of Wirrawee. The name of the series is derived from the title of the first book, Tomorrow, When the War Began.

The books in the series were originally published from 1993–99, by Pan Macmillan, and have been reprinted sixteen times. A sequel series, The Ellie Chronicles, was later published from 2003 to 2006. The follow-up series concerns itself largely with the attempts of society and the protagonist to regain a normal level of functioning in the face of the psychological damage sustained during the war.

In the original series (1993–99) the identity of the invading force is never specified, which is most likely by explicit intent of the author. In the sequel series (2003–06) the invading force is specified as a coalition of highly populous Southeast Asian nations, who see the vast underdeveloped spaces and natural resources of Australia as a way to tackle their human overpopulation problem, and the series features multinational colonies of enemy civilians being set up in conquered territory. Few parts of the war outside Ellie's immediate perspective are covered; the reader is not informed exactly how much of the country is under enemy control, though a radio broadcast early in the series confirms that several major coastal cities and much of the inland area have been seized by the invading forces. How well the war is going for the Australian military is not covered, however, it's strongly implied that they suffer heavy losses.

Tomorrow, When the War Began and its sequels are one of the most popular and critically acclaimed series of novels aimed at young readers in Australian literary history. It has sold over 3 million copies in Australia and has been translated into five languages.

== Books ==
- Tomorrow, When the War Began (1993)
- The Dead of Night (1994)
- The Third Day, the Frost (1995) (published in the U.S. and Canada as A Killing Frost)
- Darkness, Be My Friend (1996)
- Burning for Revenge (1997)
- The Night is for Hunting (1998)
- The Other Side of Dawn (1999)

== Plot summary ==
Ellie Linton goes out camping in the bush for a week with her friends Homer, Lee, Kevin, Corrie, Robyn, and Fiona 'Fi'. They find a way into a large, vegetated sinkhole in a remote area of bush the locals call "Hell", and camp there for the week. During this time they see large numbers of planes flying through the night without lights, and though it is mentioned in conversation the following morning, they think little of it.

When they return home they find that all the people are missing and their pets and livestock are dead or dying. They come to realise that Australia has been invaded and their family and friends have been taken prisoner. Avoiding capture by enemy soldiers in their hometown of Wirrawee and picking up one of their school friends Chris, the group return to Hell. After a short period of recovery they start making plans to fight back.

Over the course of the first three books in the series, the group succeeds in destroying a bridge that leads into Wirrawee, an enemy convoy, several houses that are being used by the enemy as a centre of operations, and a nearby strategic harbour. However, Corrie and Chris are killed during this time. After the harbour raid, the surviving members of the group are eventually captured and placed in a maximum security prison in the nearby city of Stratton. During an air-raid by the Royal New Zealand Air Force the group escapes but Robyn is killed while doing so. They encounter a downed RNZAF pilot and arrange to be evacuated to New Zealand.

Book four, Darkness, Be My Friend, takes place several months later. The group is trying to live a normal life in New Zealand with other refugees, but are haunted by their memories of the war (which is still ongoing). They are approached by the New Zealand Defence Force, who are seeking Australian guerrillas to act as guides for saboteur units that are being dropped into occupied Australian territory. The group returns to Wirrawee accompanied by a platoon of New Zealand troops. However the New Zealanders go missing while on a mission to destroy Wirrawee Airfield (which is being used as a major military airbase). Alone behind enemy lines once more, the group decides to attack the airfield themselves but a combination of poor planning and bad luck causes them to fail, but they manage to return to Hell.

Soon after, through sheer luck, the group find themselves perfectly positioned to attempt another attack on the airfield. This time they succeed and manage to destroy a majority of planes on the airfield. After the attack, the group find their way to Stratton. There they encounter a tribe of feral (and hostile) children, who have been living on the streets and hiding from enemy troops since the war began. The group rescue five of the children who have been captured by an enemy patrol and escape back to Hell, where they look after them. During this time strained relationships are mended and the soul-destroying effects of the war are tempered by a chance to do something positive. However, this period does not last. A patrol ambushes the group near their base and after defeating their attackers in a prolonged firefight the group realises that they are no longer safe in Hell and make contact with New Zealand immediately.

They discover that the war is entering its final days and that groups of partisans like themselves are being asked to cause as much chaos behind enemy lines as possible while New Zealand and its allies launch an all-out offensive. The group arranges for the feral children to be evacuated to New Zealand and are provided with plastic explosives to carry out their task.

The group attacks a service station frequented by enemy convoys but are separated in the aftermath. Ellie is shot in the leg and taken prisoner. While interned, she discovers the location of her mother and father. She escapes and is reunited with her mother whom she stays with until news breaks that the war is over – Australia signs a peace treaty with the occupying power, resulting in the formation of a new nation on the continent for the invading forces and settlers.

It transpires that Wirrawee is on the Australian side of the border. Ellie, her mother and her father return to their farm and, like all the other survivors of the war, begin picking up the pieces of their lives.

== Characters ==
=== The group ===
Ellie Linton
The main protagonist and narrator of the series. Ellie was born and raised on a cattle and sheep farm not far from the edge of the country town of Wirrawee. She is loyal to her friends, to her family, she loves the Australian bush and the life on the land. Ellie prides herself on being the strongest member (and therefore one of the leaders) of the group. Nevertheless, she is often scared and uncertain of her actions and tries to hide what she perceives to be these moments of weakness from her friends.

Corrie Mackenzie
Ellie's best friend since childhood. It was Corrie who first suggested going on a camping trip into Hell. Corrie was shot and mortally wounded at the end of the first book. Corrie's death affects the group deeply, especially Ellie who eventually comes to terms with the loss in book four, Darkness, Be My Friend.

Homer Yannos
Ellie's neighbour and close friend. Homer is forceful and domineering and has trouble dealing with other strong personalities. Prior to the war Homer appeared to be a wild and irresponsible boy. The war reveals him to be a strong leader. However, on occasions where he is not in control Homer reverts to his immature ways. As the war progresses he gradually relies on Ellie to get the group to safety. A romance starts to blossom between Homer and Fiona as the war goes on.

Fiona 'Fi' Maxwell
Fiona had a sheltered upbringing before the war. Fi was shown early on to be the least physically capable of the group. Despite this Fiona manages to find the courage within herself to complete the tasks she has been set, though she rarely takes an active role in planning the group's attacks. Fiona becomes Ellie's confidante after Corrie's departure and acts as the most rational member of the group after Robyn. She develops a slow romance with the wild Homer.

Lee Takkam
Prior to the war Lee was a studious, somewhat lonely boy. During the war Lee demonstrates an aptitude for violence, a tendency to act impulsively and a strong desire for vengeance, especially after finding out his parents were killed. He develops a relationship with Ellie.

Robyn Mathers
A friend of Ellie and Corrie's with really strong held religious beliefs. Robyn is calm under pressure and is a capable leader. She regards herself as a pacifist and refuses to participate in any activities where she will be required to directly take a life. Despite this she is convinced that what the group is doing is right and enjoys the adrenaline rush that being in dangerous situations gives her. She eventually is killed in an act of heroism in book three, Third Day, The Frost, where she blows herself up in order to kill Major Harvey once and for all.

Kevin Holmes
Corrie's boyfriend, Kevin fancies himself a tough guy but is shown to have difficulty handling high pressure situations. Kevin is separated from the group at the end of book one, Tomorrow, When the War Began. When he is reunited with them again near the beginning of book three, Third Day, The Frost, he is shocked to see how brutal the war has made his friends. His knowledge of explosives enables the group to successfully attack the Cobbler's Bay harbor.

=== Others ===
Major Harvey
A former school deputy principal who was once in the Army Reserve, Harvey is introduced as the leader of Harvey's Heroes, a group of adult partisans. It is later revealed that Harvey was working with the invaders and that the Harvey's Heroes organisation was established to deliver would-be resistance fighters into the hands of the invaders. As such he plays as a primary antagonist to the group.

Colonel Finley
An officer of the New Zealand Army's Intelligence Corps. Finley supervised the group's recovery and well-being during their time in New Zealand, and later becomes their de facto commanding officer when the group returned to Wirrawee.

Gavin
A young deaf boy who was part of a gang of war orphans, led by a dictatorial boy called Aldo, living in Stratton since the war began. Of the children the group rescue, only Gavin had occupied a position amongst Aldo's inner circle. Being used to a position of power, Gavin immediately establishes himself as the leader of the children. He initially doesn't trust Ellie and her friends but soon comes to feel affection and respect for them.

== Themes ==
In his book John Marsden: Darkness, Shadow, and Light John Noell Moore, associate professor of English at the College of William & Mary, identifies several significant themes of the series; the transition from innocence to experience; the power of the Australian landscape; understanding the past as a way of dealing with the present and preparing for the future; and writing and storytelling and how they shape identity.

The transition from innocence to experience is shown in transformations in Ellie's thinking and her changing notions towards leadership and courage as the series progresses. Ellie's reasons for chronicling her experiences also develop throughout the series. She starts out recording for the group who don't want to die unnoticed and forgotten and continues writing for herself to better understand her own thoughts and feelings. Later on she writes to recreate the past which has become a lost world to her and preserve the lessons that she has learnt from it. The Australian bush becomes "a symbol of stability in a world that seems to be disintegrating". Its presence gives hope to the characters throughout the series.

Other notable themes in the series are the role of family and friendship; sexual maturation and the conflicting worldviews of teenagers and adults.

== Inspiration ==
John Marsden was inspired to write Tomorrow, When the War Began while watching an ANZAC Day march. A large number of teenagers were in attendance, paying respect to the sacrifices made by the past generations. He wondered how they might react if they were placed in the same position that their grandparents were at their age. He felt that the popular media's view of the average young person as "illiterate, drug crazed, suicidal, alcoholic, criminal, promiscuous, a dole bludger, or all of the above" was wrong. It seemed to him that like the generations before them modern teenagers would "dig deep and find reserves of initiative, maturity, responsibility and even heroism".

With Tomorrow, When the War Began and its sequels Marsden set out to write an "old fashioned adventure story". To do this Marsden looked to the authors he had read most avidly as a teenager, thriller writers such as Ian Fleming, Desmond Bagley, John Buchan, Hammond Innes and Alistair MacLean. He sought to emulate their approaches to timing, pacing and building tension and suspense and combine them with "the new teenage genres, where feelings, relationships and character development were all-important."

The inspiration for the rural setting of the series was what Marsden saw as the disappearance of the bush tales that he had enjoyed growing up. He had noticed that many novels for young people published in recent decades were about issues arising for families and children living in the suburbs. In Marsden on Marsden he writes:

I've written some of these novels myself, and I know and appreciate the need for them, but I thought it was a pity that we had gotten so far away from the bush and country novels that were popular in earlier generations, and I quite consciously set out to revive that genre."

Marsden cites the works of the Australian children's author Mary Grant Bruce as a major influence on the series. In his introduction to the John Marsden Presents: Australian Children's Classics imprint of Bruce's 1940 novel Peter and Co Marsden notes the book's similarities to his series. Both are stories about groups of young people battling enemy forces intent on the invasion of Australia. Marsden states that while he didn't intentionally set out to emulate Peter and Co when he wrote Tomorrow, When the War Began, he does see many of his memories of the novel reflected in his work.

Ellie, the Tomorrow series central protagonist, was modelled after the "courageous and resourceful" farm girl Norah from Mary Grant Bruce's Billabong series of novels. The series follows the fortunes of the Linton family, the owners of a large cattle station in Victoria, during the first half of the 20th century. In the Tomorrow series it is implied that Ellie is the great-granddaughter of Norah's brother Jim. The character was also inspired by Charlotte Austin, a student whom Marsden had taught and admired for her resourcefulness, honesty and "gutsy approach to life".

The character of Homer was based on a number of students from rural backgrounds that Marsden had taught. He noticed that many of these students, who at home drove cars, ploughed fields, harvested crops, worked as shearers and more, had trouble adjusting to an environment where they "were not trusted to change a light globe or put a Band-Aid on a cut". These students became frustrated and angry and their immature behaviour was the result.

Robyn was modelled after Marsden's own sister, a deeply committed Christian. Marsden was inspired to write the character when he noticed that while many teenagers identified themselves as Christians this group was not represented at all in fiction written for them. Chris was an approximation of Marsden himself as a teen, though unlike Chris, Marsden never used drugs.

When asked why young people related to the characters in his books, Ellie in particular, Marsden speculated that, like himself, they found their strength and self-reliance inspirational. In an interview with the Australian Broadcasting Corporation's Rollercoaster website he explained what inspired him to highlight these virtues in his work:

I've always been attracted to strong people in real life and in fiction. As a kid I read a lot of books like The Naked Island about Russell Braddon and his experiences on the Burma-Thai Railway and The Cattle King, which is the biography of Sidney Kidman, and they had a profound impact on me, and I read those books many times. So I think the idea of people overcoming adversity by using their own resources was strongly imprinted in me by those books, because those guys had nothing except their own strength and their own mind power. There's something noble about that."

== Reception ==
Upon publication, the series was met with overwhelmingly positive reviews. Critics praised the series for its insightful look at a wide range of issues and suspense filled narrative. The Age proclaimed the series "the best series for Australian teens of all time..." and said "like ancient myths the stories confront the purpose of life, death, betrayal, killing, love, hate, revenge, selfishness, sacrifice and... faith". The Horn Book Magazine found the series "riveting" and said "thoughtful explorations of the nature of fear, bravery and violence add depth and balance to the edge-of-the-seat-action and intense first person narration". Georges T. Dodds from the SF Site described the series as "an elevation of adventure literature to heights that are only achieved once or twice in a generation". He praised Marsden's depictions of combat stress and action sequences, which he found reminiscent of John Buchan's work in The Thirty-Nine Steps. Viewpoint, Australia's major Young Adult fiction review journal, described the series as "a war story told with storytelling skills that Alistair MacLean used to display". Gregory Maguire of the New York Times found the series to be "intense" and "compulsively readable", but criticised the books for their episodic structures.

Five of the seven books in the Tomorrow series (excluding Tomorrow, When the War Began and The Night is for Hunting) were listed by the Children's Book Council of Australia as a notable title for older readers for its respective year of publication. The first novel is recommended by the New South Wales Board of Studies as a text to be studied in English classes during Stage 5 (Years 9 and 10). In 2013, Tomorrow, When the War Began was voted Australia's favourite Australian book in a poll run by Get Reading!, an annual campaign run by the Australian Government to encourage Australians to read.

The series has also received accolades from outside Australia. The American Library Association recognised Tomorrow, When the War Began as one of the best young adult novels published in the United States in 1996, then again in 2000 as one of the best 100 books for teenage readers published since 1966. In 1999, The Third Day, The Frost won the Buxtehude Bull, a prestigious German prize for young adult literature. In 2000, the Swedish Government arranged for the translation and distribution of Tomorrow, When the War Began to every child of appropriate age in the country because it was thought the book would be enjoyed by reluctant readers.

Retrospectively, the series has been criticised for creating "a paranoid, white nationalist fantasy about a group of coloured people illegally invading" Australia.

=== List of awards and nominations ===
Title	Year	Awards
Tomorrow, When the War Began	1993	Winner, Australian Multicultural Children's Book Award 1994; Selected, American Library Association list of Best Books for Young Adults 1996; Selected, American Library Association list of 100 Best Books for Teens 1966–2000; Selected, American Library Association list of Popular Paperbacks for Young Adults 1998, Nominated 2011; Winner, Fanfare Horn Book Best Book 1996; Winner, Children's Yearly Best-Ever Reads (CYBER) Best Book for Older Readers 2000, 2001, 2002; Selected, Whitcoulls top 100 books, 2008 (No. 63); Selected, COOL Awards (Canberra's Own Outstanding List) 1995; Winner, KOALA (Kids Own Australian Literature Awards) 1995; Winner, YABBA (Young Australian Best Book Award) 1995; Winner, WAYRBA (West Australian Young Readers' Books Award) 1995; Winner, BILBY Awards (Books I Love Best Yearly) 1998; Nominated, South Carolina Book Award 1998; Winner, New South Wales Talking Book Award; Voted Australia's favourite Australian book in Get Reading's Australia's Top 100 Favourite Homegrown Reads poll, 2013.
The Dead of the Night	1994	Notable Book, CBCA Children's Book of the Year Award: Older Readers 1995; Selected, COOL Awards (Canberra's Own Outstanding List) 1998
The Third Day, the Frost (Also titled A Killing Frost)	1995	Winner, Buxtehude Bull Prize 1999; Notable Book, CBCA Children's Book of the Year Award: Older Readers 1996; Winner, WAYRBA (West Australian Young Readers' Books Award) 1998; Selected, COOL Awards (Canberra's Own Outstanding List) 1999
Darkness, Be My Friend	1996	Notable Book, CBCA Children's Book of the Year Award: Older Readers 1997
Burning for Revenge	1997	Notable Book, CBCA Children's Book of the Year Award: Older Readers 1998; Winner, Nielsen BookData/Australian Booksellers Association Book of the Year Award 1997; Winner, WAYRBA (West Australian Young Readers' Books Award) 1999
The Night is for Hunting	1998	Selected, COOL Awards (Canberra's Own Outstanding List) 2000; Winner, WAYRBA (West Australian Young Readers' Books Award) 2000; Shortlisted, Nielsen BookData/Australian Booksellers Association Book of the Year Award 1999
The Other Side of Dawn	1999	Notable Book, CBCA Children's Book of the Year Award: Older Readers 2000; Winner, YABBA (Young Australian Best Book Award) 2000

== Sequel series: The Ellie Chronicles ==
Following on from the Tomorrow series, Marsden released a sequel trilogy titled The Ellie Chronicles; While I Live (2003), Incurable (2005), and Circle of Flight (2006). The three books detail Ellie's struggles in post-war life in Wirrawee. Ellie finds herself running the family farm after the murder of her parents, and dealing with Gavin, the deaf boy she rescued during the war. Shortly after the death of her parents, Ellie faces bankruptcy and turns to Homer's parents, Mr. and Mrs. Yannos, for help. In addition, a group called "Liberation", headed by the mysterious "Scarlet Pimple" (a play of words on "The Scarlet Pimpernel"), are conducting secret border raids against the new nation.

== Adaptations ==
=== Film ===
In June 2009, Screen Australia announced that it would fund the development of the feature film Tomorrow, When the War Began, written and directed by screenwriter Stuart Beattie (Australia, Collateral, Pirates of the Caribbean: The Curse of the Black Pearl), and produced by Andrew Mason for Ambience Entertainment, reportedly to begin production in late 2009. Raymond Terrace in the Hunter Region of New South Wales, was chosen as a major location for producing the film. The film was released in Australian cinemas on 2 September 2010. Reception for the movie was mixed. Review aggregate website Rotten Tomatoes reports that 64% of critics have given the film a positive review, with an average score of 5.6 out of 10. Reviewers frequently cited a poor script and poor acting as flaws. The film was a success in Australia but "failed to find an international audience".

=== Television ===
A television adaption of the Tomorrow series has been produced, though the cast from the film adaptation did not reprise their roles. The series consists of six episodes and airs on ABC3. Filming took place from 14 September to 13 November 2015 in Melbourne, and premiered on 23 April 2016.

== See also ==
- How I Live Now
- Red Dawn
- Invasion literature
