= Stuart Beattie =

Australian screenwriter and film director

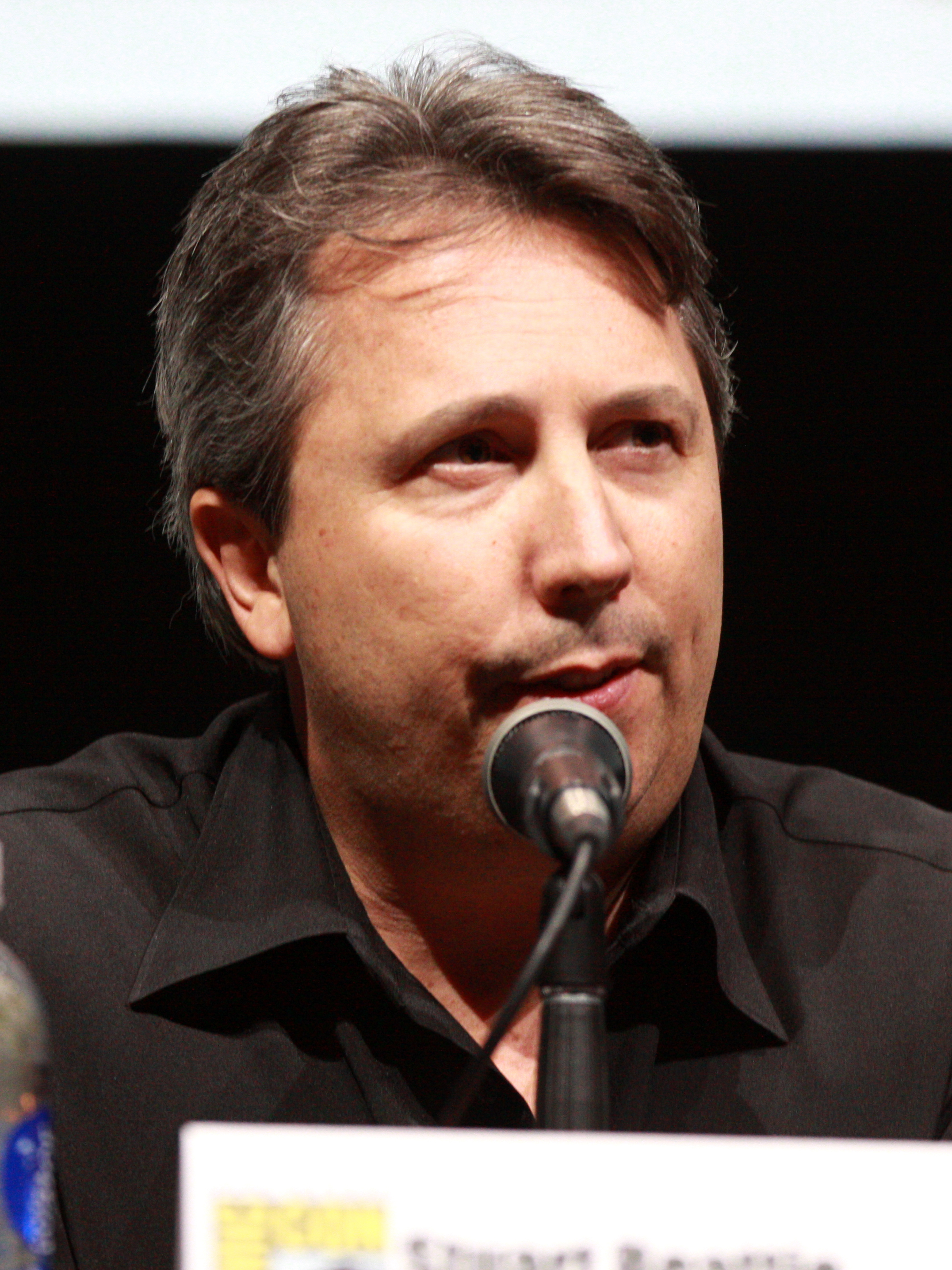
- Beattie in 2013
- Born: 4 August 1971 (age 55); Melbourne, Victoria, Australia
- Occupations: Screenwriter, film director, film producer
- Years active: 1997–present

Stuart Beattie (born 4 August 1971) is an Australian filmmaker. His screenplay for Collateral (2004) earned him nominations for the BAFTA Award for Best Original Screenplay, Satellite Award for Best Original Screenplay and Saturn Award for Best Writing.

Beattie was born in Melbourne and raised in Sydney. He attended Knox Grammar School in Sydney, where his mother, Sandra, was a languages teacher; and later Charles Sturt University in Bathurst.

== Filmography ==
=== Film ===
Year	Title	Director	Writer	Producer
1997	Joey	No	Yes	No
1998	The Protector	No	Yes	No
1999	Kick	No	Yes	No
2003	Pirates of the Caribbean: The Curse of the Black Pearl	No	Story	No
2004	Collateral	No	Yes	No
2005	Derailed	No	Yes	No
2007	30 Days of Night	No	Yes	No
2008	Australia	No	Yes	No
2009	G.I. Joe: The Rise of Cobra	No	Yes	No
2010	Tomorrow, When the War Began	Yes	Yes	No
2014	I, Frankenstein	Yes	Yes	No
2019	Danger Close: The Battle of Long Tan	No	Yes	Yes
2022	Interceptor	No	Yes	No

Uncredited rewrites

- The Messengers (2007)
- Punisher: War Zone (2008)

=== Television ===
Year	Title	Notes
2015	Deadline Gallipoli	TV mini-series
2022	Obi-Wan Kenobi	TV mini-series, wrote 4 episodes

== Awards and nominations ==
Year	Title	Award
2003	Pirates of the Caribbean: The Curse of the Black Pearl	Nominated- Hugo Award for Best Dramatic Presentation
2004	Collateral	Nominated- BAFTA Award for Best Original Screenplay; Nominated- Edgar Award for Best Motion Picture Screenplay; Nominated- Saturn Award for Best Writing; Nominated- Satellite Award for Best Original Screenplay
2008	Australia	Nominated- Satellite Award for Best Original Screenplay
2009	G.I. Joe: The Rise of Cobra	Nominated- Golden Raspberry Award for Worst Screenplay
2010	Tomorrow, When the War Began	AACTA Award for Best Adapted Screenplay; Nominated- Film Critics Circle of Australia Award for Best Director; Nominated- Film Critics Circle of Australia Award for Best Screenplay
2015	Deadline Gallipoli	AWGIE Award for Best Television Miniseries
