= John Marsden (writer) =

Australian writer and educator (1950–2024)

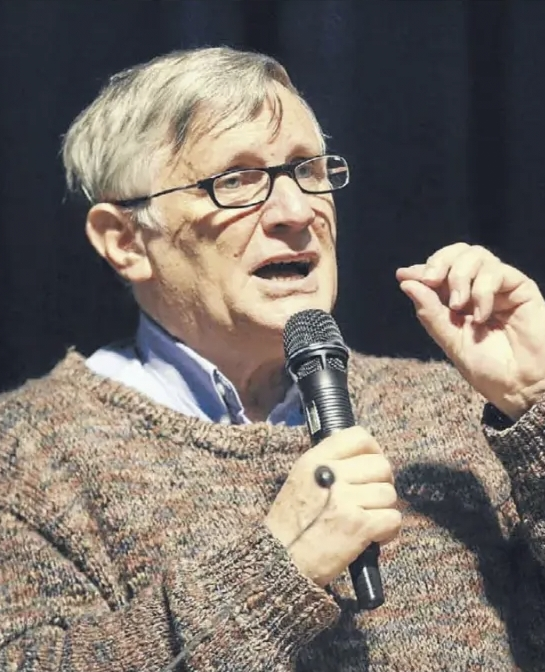
- Marsden in 2011
- Born: 27 September 1950; Melbourne, Victoria, Australia
- Died: 18 December 2024 (aged 74); Romsey, Victoria, Australia
- Occupations: Writer; teacher; principal
- Spouse: Kristin Marsden (m. 2011)
- Children: 6 (step-children)
- Writing career
- Pen name: James Hordern
- Period: 1987–2021
- Genre: Young adult fiction
- Notable works: Tomorrow series; So Much to Tell You; Checkers; Letters from the Inside; Winter
- Notable awards: Lloyd O'Neil Award, 2006; Dromkeen Medal, 2018; Buxtehude Bull
- Website: johnmarsden.com.au

John Marsden (27 September 1950 – 18 December 2024) was an Australian writer and teacher. He wrote more than 40 books in his career, including his young adult novel Tomorrow, When the War Began, which began a series of seven books.

Marsden began writing for children while working as a teacher, and had his first book, So Much to Tell You, published in 1987. In 2006, he started an alternative school, Candlebark School, and reduced his writing to focus on teaching and running the school. In 2016, he opened the arts-focused secondary school, Alice Miller School. Both schools are in the Macedon Ranges of Victoria.

== Early life and education ==
John Marsden was born on 27 September 1950 in Melbourne, the son of Eustace Culham Hudson Marsden and Jeanne Lawler Marsden. He had two older siblings. Robin and Andrew (Sam) and a younger sibling, Rosalind. He spent the first 10 years of his life living in the country towns of Kyneton and Devonport, Tasmania. He was a great-great-great-great nephew of colonial Anglican clergyman and magistrate Samuel Marsden.

When Marsden was 10 years old, he moved to Sydney and attended The King's School, Parramatta. He was accepted into the University of Sydney to study a double degree in law and arts, but eventually dropped out. He worked at different jobs, including an abattoir, working in a mortuary, delivering pizzas, working as a motorbike courier, working as a nightwatchman, selling encyclopaedias, and working with chickens.

== Career ==
=== Early career ===
While working at Geelong Grammar School's Timbertop campus as an English teacher, Marsden made the decision to write for teenagers, following his dissatisfaction with his students' apathy towards reading, or the observation that teenagers simply were not reading anymore. Marsden then wrote So Much to Tell You in only three weeks, and the book was published in 1987. The book sold record numbers and won numerous awards including "Book of the Year" by the Children's Book Council of Australia (CBCA).

In the five years following the publication of So Much To Tell You, Marsden published six more books. Notable works from this period are Out of Time, which was nominated by the CBCA as a notable book for older readers, and Letters From the Inside and a sequel to So Much to Tell You called Take My Word For It, which were both shortlisted for the CBCA's Children's Book of the Year: Older Readers award. Upon publication in the United States, Letters From the Inside received accolades from The Horn Book Magazine and the American Library Association. American novelist Robert Cormier found the novel "unforgettable" and described Marsden as a "major writer deserving of world-wide acclaim".

=== Later career ===
In 1993, Marsden published Tomorrow, When the War Began, the first book in the Tomorrow series and his most acclaimed work. Marsden went on to write seven books in the Tomorrow series, together with a follow-up trilogy, The Ellie Chronicles.

At the same time as writing the Tomorrow series, Marsden wrote several other novels such as Checkers, edited works such as This I Believe, wrote children's picture books such as The Rabbits, poetry such as Prayer for the Twenty-First Century, and non-fiction works such as Everything I Know About Writing and Secret Men's Business. He wrote more than 40 books in his career. His last novel, titled Take Risks, was published in 2021.

=== Themes ===
Marsden's earlier works are largely novels aimed at teenage or young adult audience. Common themes in Marsden's works include sexuality, violence in society, survival at school and in a harsh world, and conflict with adult authority figures. However, Marsden also declared that he wished to write about "things that have always been important for humans... [such as] love, for a start. And the absence of love. The way people relate to each other. The way people solve problems. Courage. Spirit. The human spirit."

== Pseudonymous novel ==
In 1994, a sexually explicit adult novel Lost To View, written by Marsden, was published under the pseudonym “James Hordern”. It tells the story of a teenage runaway who becomes a sex worker. Marsden acknowledged that he was the author of this novel in an interview with the Weekend Australian in 2019, saying: "I might as well stop being coy about it … plus you’ll never find it anyway."

== Recognition and accolades ==
In 1996, Marsden's books took the top six places on the Teenage Fiction best-seller lists for Australia. Also in 1996, he was named "Australia's most popular author today in any literary field" by The Australian. In 1997, Australian readers voted three of his books into Australia's 100 most-loved books of all time. His books have also been translated into many languages. As of 1999, his works had been translated into 13 languages, including Norwegian, Afrikaans and Persian.

Marsden won every major writing award in Australia for young people's fiction, including what he described as one of the highlights of his career, the 2006 Lloyd O'Neil Award for contributions to Australian publishing. This award meant that Marsden was one of only five authors to be honoured for lifelong services to the Australian book industry at the time.

He was twice named among Best Books of the Year by the American Library Association and once by Publishers Weekly, was runner-up for Dutch Children's Book of the Year and short-listed for the German Young Readers' Award, won the Grand Jury Prize as Austria's Most Popular Writer for Teenagers, and won the coveted Buxtehude Bull in Germany.

In 2008 he was nominated for the Astrid Lindgren Memorial Award, the world's largest children's and youth literature award and the second largest literature prize in the world.

In 2014, Lyndon Terracini announced that Opera Australia had co-commissioned her and Kate Miller-Heidke to write an opera based on Marsden's The Rabbits. The work, The Rabbits, premiered in 2015 in Perth, and was staged in Melbourne, Sydney, and Brisbane, winning several awards.

In December 2018, Marsden was awarded the Dromkeen Medal, in recognition of his outstanding achievement in children's and young adult literature.

In April 2021, University of the Sunshine Coast awarded Marsden with an honorary doctorate.

== Critique ==
Writer Alice Pung has praised Marsden's works, including Winter, stating that his success among young adults is due to the fact that he puts the experiences and perspectives of children at the centre of his writing.

Some critics have suggested that Marsden's writings are too negative. Michaels criticises him for portraying the world as fundamentally malevolent. Scutter agrees, suggesting that the children portrayed in his writings are extremely troubled. She thinks that Marsden represents adolescence as a period of life that is completely beset with "pain, loneliness, difficulty in communication [and] lack of love". Moreover, Michaels suggests that in Marsden's work the adolescent characters' pain and suffering is often caused directly or indirectly by the adult characters. The adolescent characters are left to sort out their problems and find their identity alone, without any adult assistance or support. Scutter suggests that rather than creating a realistic story, as Marsden and those who enjoy his novels suggest, this is just as unrealistic as other works of fiction, such as those of Enid Blyton.

Pung defends Marsden against this criticism of writing novels with overly painful storylines. She notes that she grew up with people who had lived through war, and with others who came to Australia as unaccompanied minors. For them, the weak or absent adult characters in Marsden's novels are simply an accurate reflection of their life. Pung notes that, as a society, we have no objections to the works of William Shakespeare, despite the fact that his plays portray suicide, violence, anti-Semitism and madness. She suggests that the reason for this is that Shakespeare's works are far removed from our daily life, which means that we can explain any moral atrocities as a product of the culture or the era. However, Marsden's books are set in modern-day Australia, in a context that most of his readers understand and live in. Pung suggests that his works are criticised for this reason; because western society, particularly Australian society, does not want to accept and acknowledge that there are teenagers in our midst who suffer terribly. Some of their parents are drug addicts, others are dead, and others suffer from domestic violence. Society is afraid of corrupting young adults if they read novels in which these horrific events happen in a context that is so close to their own. Pung suggests that we should not fear this, that young adults will not be corrupted by these books unless there was already corruption within them. Furthermore, she suggests that novels about these events help young people who undergo them to understand that their life and experience matters, that they are not alone.

== Controversy ==
While promoting his book The Art Of Growing Up on the ABC Radio National program Life Matters, Marsden spoke about bullying, saying: "A lot of the so-called bullying in schools is just kids giving each other feedback...it’s rare for a child who’s got likeable qualities to be treated in some sort of horrific or bullying way," which was widely criticised. Marsden defended his views, going on to say that students from other cultures were bullied less at Geelong Grammar if they were more "Westernised", saying: "If they were able to speak English fluently and wear the clothes that Anglo kids wore and listened to the same kind of music, then they were fully accepted. There was absolutely no racism involved".

== Schools ==
In 2006, Marsden started an alternative school, Candlebark School, catering for years K–12, in the Macedon Ranges. He reduced his writing to focus on teaching and running the school. In 2016, he opened the arts-focused secondary school, Alice Miller School, also in the Macedon Ranges.

== Personal life, death and legacy ==
Marsden was married to Kristin from 2011, and had six stepsons. Marsden separated from Kristin in 2023. He lived in Lancefield, Victoria, from 2014 until 2023 and in Romsey, Victoria, from 2023, where he died on 18 December 2024, at the age of 74. Alice Miller School wrote a letter to parents, stating that he had died while writing at his desk at home.

Marsden was the patron of Express Media, a youth arts organisation, which awarded the annual John Marsden Prize for Young Australian Writers from 2005. Marsden initially funded and judged the award. The prize was renamed in 2020 to the Hachette Australia Prize for Young Writers.

== Published works ==
=== Tomorrow series ===
| Title | Year | Notes |
|---|---|---|
| Tomorrow, When the War Began | 1993 | Winner, Australian Multicultural Children's Book Award 1994; Selected, American Library Association list of Best Books for Young Adults 1996; Selected, American Library Association list of 100 Best Books for Teens 1966–2000; Selected, American Library Association list of Popular Paperbacks for Young Adults 1998, Nominated 2011; Winner, Fanfare Horn Book Best Book 1996; Winner, Children's Yearly Best-Ever Reads (CYBER) Best Book for Older Readers 2000, 2001, 2002; Selected, Whitcoulls top 100 books, 2008 (No. 63); Selected, COOL Awards (Canberra's Own Outstanding List) 1995; Winner, KOALA (Kids Own Australian Literature Awards) 1995; Winner, YABBA (Young Australian Best Book Award) 1995; Winner, WAYRBA (West Australian Young Readers' Books Award) 1995; Winner, BILBY Awards (Books I Love Best Yearly) 1998; Nominated, South Carolina Book Award 1998; Winner, New South Wales Talking Book Award |
| The Dead of Night | 1994 | Notable Book, CBCA Children's Book of the Year Award: Older Readers 1995; Selected, COOL Awards (Canberra's Own Outstanding List) 1998 |
| The Third Day, The Frost | 1995 | Winner, Buxtehude Bull Prize 1999; Notable Book, CBCA Children's Book of the Year Award: Older Readers 1996; Winner, WAYRBA (West Australian Young Readers' Books Award) 1998; Selected, COOL Awards (Canberra's Own Outstanding List) 1999; Also titled A Killing Frost |
| Darkness, Be My Friend | 1996 | Notable Book, CBCA Children's Book of the Year Award: Older Readers 1997 |
| Burning for Revenge | 1997 | Notable Book, CBCA Children's Book of the Year Award: Older Readers 1998; Winner, Nielsen BookData/Australian Booksellers Association Book of the Year Award 1997; Winner, WAYRBA (West Australian Young Readers' Books Award) 1999 |
| The Night is for Hunting | 1998 | Selected, COOL Awards (Canberra's Own Outstanding List) 2000; Winner, WAYRBA (West Australian Young Readers' Books Award) 2000; Shortlisted, Nielsen BookData/Australian Booksellers Association Book of the Year Award 1999 |
| The Other Side of Dawn | 1999 | Notable Book, CBCA Children's Book of the Year Award: Older Readers 2000; Winner, YABBA (Young Australian Best Book Award) 2000 |
The Ellie Chronicles
| While I Live | 2003 | Notable Book, CBCA Children's Book of the Year Award: Older Readers 2004 |
| Incurable | 2005 | |
| Circle of Flight | 2006 | |

=== Other works ===
| Title | Year | Notes |
|---|---|---|
| So Much to Tell You | 1987 | Winner, CBCA Children's Book of the Year Award: Older Readers 1988; Winner, Victorian Premier's Literary Award Alan Marshall Award 1988; Winner, Christopher Award Books for Young People 1990; Selected, American Library Association list of Best Books for Young Adults 1990; Selected, American Library Association list of Popular Paperbacks for Young Adults 1999; Winner, KOALA (Kids Own Australian Literature Awards) 1989; Selected, COOL Awards (Canberra's Own Outstanding List) 1995; Winner, Young Adult Book Award (New South Wales, Australia) 1998 |
| The Journey | 1988 | |
| The Great Gatenby | 1989 | |
| Staying Alive in Year 5 | 1990 | |
| Out of Time | 1990 | Notable Book, CBCA Children's Book of the Year Award: Older Readers 1991 |
| Letters from the Inside | 1991 | Shortlisted, CBCA Children's Book of the Year Award: Older Readers 1992; Winner, Fanfare Horn Book Best Book 1995; Winner, Grand Jury Prize for Australia's favourite young person's novel 1996; Selected, American Library Association list of Best Books for Young Adults 1995; Selected, American Library Association list of Popular Paperbacks for Young Adults 2002; German translation Liebe Tracey, liebe Mandy: Winner of the Deutscher Hörbuchpreis in Best Children's/Youth Audiobook Category 2008 |
| Take My Word for It | 1992 | Shortlisted, CBCA Children's Book of the Year Award: Older Readers 1993 |
| Looking for Trouble | 1993 | |
| Everything I Know About Writing | 1993 | |
| Cool School | 1996 | Winner, KOALA (Kids Own Australian Literature Awards) 1998 |
| Creep Street | 1996 | |
| Checkers | 1996 | Notable Book, CBCA Children's Book of the Year Award: Older Readers 1997 |
| This I Believe | 1996 | Editor |
| For Weddings and a Funeral | 1996 | Editor |
| Dear Miffy | 1997 | |
| Prayer for the Twenty-First Century | 1997 | Notable Book, CBCA Children's Book of the Year Award: Picture Book 1998 |
| Norton's Hut | 1998 | Notable Book, CBCA Children's Book of the Year Award: Picture Book 1999; Illustrated by Peter Gouldthorpe |
| The Rabbits | 1998 | Winner, CBCA Children's Book of the Year Award: Picture Book 1999; Illustrated by Shaun Tan |
| Secret Men's Business | 1998 | |
| Goodnight and Thanks For The Teeth | 1999 | Co-author with Rob Alexander; Illustrated by Mark Jackson and Heather Potter |
| Winter | 2000 | |
| Marsden on Marsden | 2000 | |
| The Head Book | 2001 | |
| Millie | 2002 | Notable Book, CBCA Children's Book of the Year Award: Picture Book 2003; Illustrated by Sally Rippin |
| The Magic Rainforest | 2002 | |
| A Day in the Life of Me | 2002 | Illustrated by Craig Smith |
| The Boy You Brought Home | 2002 | |
| A Roomful of Magic | 2004 | Illustrated by Mark Jackson and Heather Potter |
| I Believe This | 2004 | Editor |
| Hamlet: A Novel | 2008 | |
| Home and Away | 2008 | Honour Book, CBCA Children's Book of the Year Award: Picture Book 2009; Illustrated by Matt Ottley |
| South of Darkness | 2014 | |
| The Art of Growing Up | 2019 | |
| Take Risks | 2021 | |
