= 1995 in Australian literature =

This article presents a list of the historical events and publications of Australian literature during 1995.

== Events ==
- Helen Demidenko won the Miles Franklin Award for The Hand That Signed the Paper

== Major publications ==
=== Novels ===
- Carmel Bird – The White Garden
- Marshall Browne – The Gilded Cage
- Bryce Courtenay — The Potato Factory
- Beverley Farmer — The House in the Light
- Judith Fox – Bracelet Honeymyrtle
- Paul Horsfall – The Touchstone
- Rod Jones — Billy Sunday
- Thomas Keneally — A River Town
- Christopher Koch — Highways to a War
- Amanda Lohrey – Camille's Bread
- Alex Miller — The Sitters
- Mandy Sayer — The Cross
- Kathleen Stewart — Spilt Milk

=== Crime and mystery ===
- Jon Cleary – Winter Chill
- John Dale — Dark Angel
- Garry Disher – Port Vila Blues
- Kerry Greenwood – Ruddy Gore
- Gabrielle Lord – Bones
- Barry Maitland — The Malcontenta

=== Science fiction and fantasy ===
- David Brooks — The House of Balthus
- Jack Dann — The Memory Cathedral: A Secret History of Leonardo da Vinci
- Sara Douglass — Battleaxe
- Greg Egan
  - Axiomatic
  - Distress
  - "Luminous"
  - "A Kidnapping"
  - "Mitochondrial Eve"
  - "Silver Fire"
  - "TAP"
  - "Wang's Carpets"
- Paul Kidd — Mus of Kerbridge
- Garth Nix — Sabriel
- Gillian Rubinstein — Galax-Arena
- Tony Shillitoe — The Last Wizard

=== Children's and young adult fiction ===
- Isobelle Carmody — Ashling
- Brian Caswell — Deucalion
- Mem Fox — Wombat Divine
- Sonya Hartnett — Sleeping Dogs
- Catherine Jinks — Witch Bank
- John Marsden — The Third Day, The Frost
- Garth Nix — Sabriel

=== Poetry ===
- Jordie Albiston — Nervous Arcs
- Peter Bakowski — In the Human Night
- J. S. Harry – Selected Poems
- Dorothy Hewett — Collected Poems 1940–1995
- Philip Hodgins — Things Happen
- Susan Lever — The Oxford Book of Australian Women's Verse (edited)
- Chris Wallace-Crabbe — Selected Poems : 1956–1994

=== Drama ===
- Manny Aston — Fossils
- Joanna Murray-Smith — Honour
- Louis Nowra
  - The Incorruptible
  - Miss Bosnia
- David Williamson — Dead White Males

=== Non-fiction ===
- Timothy Conigrave — Holding the Man
- Garfield Barwick — A Radical Tory: Garfield Barwick's Reflections and Recollections
- Helen Garner — The First Stone

== Awards and honours ==
- Christopher Koch AO "for service to Australian literature as a novelist"
- Alexander Stewart Cockburn AM "for service to journalism and literature"
- Bryce Courtenay AM "for service to advertising and marketing to the community and as an author"
- Mollie Gillen AM "for service to genealogy and to Australian historical research"
- Paul Jennings AM "for service to children's literature"
- Frances Margaret McGuire AM "for service to the community and to literature, particularly through the State Library of South Australia"
- Walter Richard McVitty AM "for service to the arts, particularly as educator and publisher of children's literature"
- Maurice Saxby AM "for service to children's literature"
- Gavin Souter AM "for service to Australian historical literature"
- Donald Wall AM "for service to the recorded history of World war II, particularly the history of the 8th Division and the fate of prisoners of war at Sandakan, Northern Borneo"
- Madeleine Ruby Irene Brunato-Arthur OAM "for service to Australian writers, particularly through the Fellowship of Australian Writers in South Australia"

=== Lifetime achievement ===
Award	Author
Christopher Brennan Award	Thomas Shapcott; Robert Adamson
Patrick White Award	Elizabeth Riddell

=== Literary ===
Award	Author	Title	Publisher
The Age Book of the Year Award	Chris Wallace-Crabbe	Selected Poems : 1956–1994	Oxford University Press
ALS Gold Medal	Helen Demidenko	The Hand That Signed the Paper	Allen & Unwin
Colin Roderick Award	Judy Cassab	Diaries	Random House
New South Wales Premier's Literary Awards – Book of the Year	David Horton	The Encyclopaedia of Aboriginal Australia	Aboriginal Studies Press
Nita Kibble Literary Award	Drusilla Modjeska	The Orchard	Pan Macmillan

=== Fiction ===
==== International ====
Award	Category	Author	Title	Publisher
Commonwealth Writers' Prize	Best Novel, SE Asia and South Pacific region	Tim Winton	The Riders	Pan Macmillan
Commonwealth Writers' Prize	Best First Novel, SE Asia and South Pacific region	Adib Khan	Seasonal Adjustments	Allen & Unwin
Commonwealth Writers' Prize	Best Overall First Novel	Adib Khan	Seasonal Adjustments	Allen & Unwin

==== National ====
Award	Author	Title	Publisher
Adelaide Festival Awards for Literature	Not awarded		
The Age Book of the Year Award	Rod Jones	Billy Sunday	Picador
The Australian/Vogel Literary Award	Richard King	Kindling Does for Firewood	Allen and Unwin
Miles Franklin Award	Helen Demidenko	The Hand That Signed the Paper	Allen and Unwin
New South Wales Premier's Literary Awards	Lily Brett	Just Like That	Pan Macmillan
Victorian Premier's Literary Awards	Kate Grenville	Dark Places	Macmillan
Western Australian Premier's Book Awards	Simone Lazaroo	The World Waiting to be Made	Fremantle Arts Centre Press

=== Poetry ===
Award	Author	Title	Publisher
Adelaide Festival Awards for Literature	Not awarded		
The Age Book of the Year Award	Chris Wallace-Crabbe	Selected Poems : 1956–1994	Oxford University Press
Anne Elder Award	Jennifer Harrison	Michelangelo's Prisoners	Black Pepper Press
Grace Leven Prize for Poetry	Kevin Hart	New and Selected Poems	Angus and Robertson
Grace Leven Prize for Poetry	Rhyll McMaster	Flying the Coop : New and Selected Poems 1972–1994	Heinemann
Grace Leven Prize for Poetry	Jemal Sharah	Path of Ghosts: Poems 1986–93	Heinemann
Mary Gilmore Award	Aileen Kelly	Coming Up for Light	Pariah Press
New South Wales Premier's Literary Awards	Peter Boyle	Coming Home From the World	Five Islands Press
Victorian Premier's Literary Awards	Bruce Beaver	Anima and Other Poems	University of Queensland Press
Western Australian Premier's Book Awards	Andrew Taylor	Sandstone	University of Queensland Press

=== Children and Young Adult ===
Award	Category	Author	Title	Publisher
Adelaide Festival Awards for Literature	Children's	Not awarded		
Children's Book of the Year Award	Older Readers	Gillian Rubinstein	Foxspell	Hyland House
Children's Book of the Year Award	Picture Book	Gary Crew & Stephen Woolman	The Watertower	Keystone, Era
New South Wales Premier's Literary Awards	Young People's Literature	Jenny Pausacker	Mr Enigmatic	Reed for Kids
Victorian Premier's Prize for Young Adult Fiction		Allan Baillie	Songman	Viking Books
Western Australian Premier's Book Awards	Children's and YA	Glyn Parry	Radical Take-offs	Allen & Unwin

=== Science fiction and fantasy ===
Award	Category	Author	Title	Publisher
Australian SF Achievement Award	Best Australian Long Fiction	Greg Egan	Permutation City	Millenium
Australian SF Achievement Award	Best Australian Short Fiction	Greg Egan	"Cocoon"	Isaac Asimov's SF Magazine May 1994

=== Drama ===
Award	Category	Author	Title
New South Wales Premier's Literary Awards	FilmScript	Jane Kennedy, Santo Cilauro, Tom Gleisner and Rob Sitch	"Playing the Ego Card", Frontline
New South Wales Premier's Literary Awards	Play	Michael Gow	Sweet Phoebe
New South Wales Premier's Literary Awards	Play	Hannie Rayson	Falling From Grace
Victorian Premier's Literary Awards	Drama	Barry Dickins	Remembering Ronald Ryan

=== Non-fiction ===
Award	Author	Title	Publisher
Adelaide Festival Awards for Literature	Not awarded		
The Age Book of the Year Award	Tim Flannery	The Future Eaters	New Holland Publishers
New South Wales Premier's Literary Awards	Drusilla Modjeska	The Orchard	MacMillan
Victorian Premier's Literary Awards	Brenda Niall	Georgiana: A Biography of Georgiana McCrae, Painter, Diarist, Pioneer	Melbourne University Press

== Deaths ==
A list, ordered by date of death (and, if the date is either unspecified or repeated, ordered alphabetically by surname) of deaths in 1995 of Australian literary figures, authors of written works or literature-related individuals follows, including year of birth.

- 13 January — Max Harris (poet), poet, critic, columnist, commentator, publisher and bookseller (born 1921)
- 25 January — Margaret Senior, wildlife and children's illustrator and writer (born 1917 in London)
- 20 March — Russell Braddon, writer of novels, biographies and TV scripts (born 1921)
- 12 May — John Blight, poet (born 1913)
- 26 June — John Jefferson Bray, lawyer, judge, academic, university administrator, Crown officer and published poet, (born 1912)
- 17 July — Robert Close, novelist (died in Majorca, Spain)(born 1903)
- 7 August — Harold Stewart, poet and oriental scholar (died in Kyoto, Japan)(born 1916)
- 14 August — Frances Margaret McGuire, writer, biochemist and philanthropist (born 1900)
- 18 August — Philip Hodgins, poet (born 1959)
- 5 December — Gwen Harwood, poet and librettist (born 1920)

== See also ==
- 1995 in Australia
- 1995 in literature
- 1995 in poetry
- List of years in literature
- List of years in Australian literature
