= Across the Nightingale Floor =

2002 novel by Lian Hearn

- Author: Lian Hearn
- Language: English
- Series: Tales of the Otori
- Genre: Fantasy novel
- Publisher: Hodder Headline (Aus) Pan Macmillan (UK) Penguin Books (US)
- Publication date: 2002
- Publication place: Australia
- Media type: Print (Hardback & Paperback)
- Pages: 340
- ISBN: 0-7336-1562-7
- OCLC: 155836592
- Preceded by: Heaven's Net is Wide
- Followed by: Grass for His Pillow

Across the Nightingale Floor is the first of Lian Hearn's Tales of the Otori trilogy, first published in 2002.

== Plot ==
Across the Nightingale Floor is set in a fictional Sengoku period Japan, and follows the story of a sixteen-year-old boy named Tomasu and fifteen-year-old girl named Kaede.

Tomasu, a member of The Hidden by birth, returns from exploring the mountains to find members of his family slaughtered. Trying to escape he unhorses Iida Sadamu, leader of the Tohan, who led the slaughter. Chased by Iida's men, Tomasu is rescued by Lord Shigeru of the Otori. Shigeru protects Tomasu, and later adopts him. However he deems his name unsuitable because of its Hidden roots and renames him Takeo. On the road Takeo loses his voice temporarily and his hearing becomes superhuman.

On the journey to Shigeru's home, the two stop at an inn where they meet Maruyama Naomi, a powerful female ruler from the Seishuu. Lady Maruyama is found to have been against the persecution of the Hidden and urges Takeo to tell her about the slaughter. At night, when Takeo is in his room, he overhears Lady Maruyama and Shigeru expressing their love for one another.

Eventually, the pair reach Lord Shigeru's home in Hagi, where Takeo is received with astonishment by an old maid named Chiyo and Shigeru's ex-instructor, Ichiro. Takeo is slowly accepted by the household and is later adopted as Shigeru's son, under the condition that Shigeru marries Shirakawa Kaede, the most beautiful maiden in the Three Countries. However, Takeo is under the threat of Shigeru's uncles' sons, who try to murder him during practice every day.

Later, Takeo meets Muto Kenji (also known as the Fox), the master of the Muto clan, who reveals to him that Takeo's father was the most skilled assassin of the Kikuta, the greatest family of the Tribe. Kenji, after informing Takeo of this, starts to train him in the arts of the Tribe.

In autumn, Takeo sneaks out of the house one day and explores Hagi, where he meets a merchant who he'd saved when he was one of the Hidden. The merchant, recognizing him, calls him by his real name. Takeo denies it and flees. When the time comes, Shigeru and Takeo and others start preparing their trip to Tsuwano where they would meet Shigeru's future wife, Shirakawa Kaede.

At Tsuwano they meet Kaede (who has been held hostage by the Noguchi since she was seven and forced to sleep in the maid's rooms. She has been constantly harassed by the guards who wanted to have her. Not long before she had reached Tsuwano, a guard had tried to rape her, only to be stabbed with a knife). She is under the protection of her kinswoman Lady Maruyama (with whom Shigeru has had a secret relationship for almost ten years), and is accompanied by Kenji's niece, Shizuka, who is half Muto and half Kikuta.

But it is Takeo and Kaede who immediately find a connection between them. They stop at the shrine at Terayama, at the time of the Festival of the Dead, to visit the grave of Shigeru's brother, Takeshi, and for Shigeru to discuss war plans with the Abbott. As an army headed by Lord Arai musters from the west, they arrive at Inuyama in the 9th month. Shigeru plans for Takeo to assassinate Iida that night, but the Tribe, not wanting to risk Takeo (and appreciating the stability that Iida brings), abducts him so that his training can be finished.

Thus the treachery plays itself out: Shigeru is crucified on the castle wall, and Lady Maruyama and her daughter drown whilst attempting to escape. Takeo makes a deal with the Tribe that allows him to bring Shigeru's body down in return for joining them. Takeo, together with Kenji and Yuki, sneaks into the castle at night and bring Shigeru down from the wall.

Shigeru, dying from his wounds, asks Takeo to bury him at Terayama, next to his brother's grave. Then Takeo decapitates him in order to end his pain. During the invasion of the castle at Inuyama, Takeo discovers Kaede with the corpse of Iida Sadamu, whom she had killed when he attempted to rape her; the two of them make love. After carrying out Shigeru's wishes and killing the other Tohan lords, Takeo honors his promise to the Tribe and departs with them just as Arai and his army arrive, leaving Kaede unconscious from his Kikuta Stare and in the care of Muto Shizuka.

== Reception ==
Publishers Weekly wrote in a review of Across the Nightingale Floor, "For fans of Japanese samurai warrior fantasy, this novel is right in the ballpark, filled with swords, clan in-fighting, love affairs, invisibility and magical Ninja powers."

Further reviews appeared in Kirkus Reviews, The Guardian, The Sydney Morning Herald, Locus, Strange Horizons, The New York Review of Science Fiction, Foundation, and Analog.

It won the 2004 Deutscher Jugendliteraturpreis.

== See also ==
- Tales of the Otori
