= Space Demons =

1985 novel by Gillian Rubinstein

- Author: Gillian Rubinstein
- Language: English
- Genre: Young adult
- Publisher: Omnibus Books
- Publication date: 1985
- Publication place: Australia
- ISBN: 978-1-86291-287-8
- OCLC: 38379783

Space Demons is a young adult novel written by Gillian Rubinstein, first published in 1986.

It details the story of four children playing a video game which both affects and is affected by their real lives. It is the first of a trilogy, followed by Skymaze (1989) and Shinkei (1996). It was adapted as a play by Richard Tulloch in 1990.

The novel is suggested reading for schools in New South Wales, Australia.

== Plot ==
Andrew Hayford's father presents Andrew with a new Japanese videogame called Space Demons. Andrew introduces his best friend Ben Challis to the game. While playing together, Andrew sees Ben disappear for a moment. When he comes back, Ben tells Andrew that he feels like he went into the game. After Ben goes home, Andrew also finds himself pulled into the world of the game.

When they meet up after school a couple weeks later, Andrew reveals that a gun from the game came back into reality with him. Andrew and Ben have a big fight over the game and Ben's newfound friendship with their schoolmate Elaine Taylor. Andrew tells Ben that he hates him. This initiates the next stage of the game and Ben is swept into the console. To save Ben, Andrew convinces Elaine to come over, where he explains that Ben is trapped in the game. Playing on her dislike of him, Andrew goads her into shooting him with the game gun.

Inside the game, Andrew finds Ben, who explains that the game feeds on hate and that to leave the game, they must advance to the cliff top. Elaine drops into the game with the gun. The others try to take the gun from her, which results in each of them being granted their own gun. A battle ensues with the space demons. They win and find themselves back on the floor of Andrew's room.

Over the next few days, all three experience nightmares and hallucinations. Andrew got into a fight with his enemy Mario Ferrone, and Mario stole his gun. Convinced that this was part of the game's plan, Andrew invites Mario to Andrew's house, where Mario shoots himself, affording him entrance to the game. Mario and Andrew play Space Demons more and more frequently despite concerns from Andrew's mother Marjorie about Andrew's behaviour. During one of their sessions, Mario disappears from the game.

Space demons from the game begin to manifest in the real world. Only those who have played the game can see them. Anger and resentment build between the players, driven by difficult events in their home lives. Andrew's nightmares become darker as he dreams about killing people with the gun from the game. Marjorie sends Andrew to a psychiatrist. That night, he realises that he can beat the game if he refuses to hate.

Mario's brother, John, tells Elaine that Mario did not come home last night and was not at school. Ben and Elaine visit Andrew to find out what has happened to Mario. Andrew and Elaine argue and end up in the game, where they find the space demons have all been replaced by clones of Mario. While hiding from the clones, Andrew and Elaine confront their own personal issues, realising there are some things in life they cannot control and that trying will only make things worse.

Elaine sees a message that says the game can be ended by returning the gun. They both return the guns. Andrew realises that paying Mario compliments kills the demons. Elaine and Andrew witness the destruction of all the space demons. They encounter Mario near the cliff face, still holding a gun. Elaine and Andrew convince Mario to return the gun. The game ends and Andrew, Ben, Mario and Elaine end up back on the floor of Andrew's bedroom.

== Publication history ==
The following table details the publication history of the novel.

Release Year	Format	Title	Publisher	ISBN 13
2018	Paperback	Space Demons	Ligature Pty Ltd	978-1925883046
1997	Paperback	Space Demons	The Orgion Publishing Group Ltd	978-1858814384
1996	Paperback	Space Demons	Omnibus Books	978-1862912878
1988	Hardcover	Space Demons	Dial	978-0803705340
1987	Paperback	Space Demons	Omnibus/Puffin Books	978-0140321999
1986	Paperback	Space Demons	Omnibus/Puffin Books	978-1862912878

== Critical reception and reviews ==
The novel was received with contemporary critical acclaim at its time of publication. This table details the awards the novel was shortlisted for or won.

Award	Year	Result
Young Australians’ Best Book of the Year	1990	Winner
Children's Literature Award – National	1988	Winner
The Children's Book Council of Australia Book of the Year	1987	Honour Books List
Psychologists for Peace Interest Group Children's Peace Literature Award	1987	Winner

The novel is currently a suggested text in the syllabus for K-10 in NSW, Australia. Teacher Ashley Lower said that its critical reception did not surprise her: "I've just read it with a Year 9 class, who would not let me put it down.".

Yvonne Frey says of the novel: "The story is more complex, with well-rounded characters and conflicts that are not simply drawn".

== Themes ==
One of the book's central themes is the effect of dysfunctional families. Andrew, Ben, Elaine, and Mario all come from homes with issues like absent and abusive parents, and abusive siblings. Author Rubinstein has commented on the theme, saying "family is where we have the most pain and the most pleasure and the most intense emotions".

John Foster opines that the dominant theme of the novel is friendship, with the evolution of Andrew's friendships with Elaine, Ben and Mario being the central development.

Andrew Butler focuses on the violence of the game and the use of love and hate as gameplay mechanics. Butler believes that the ultimate purpose of the program is to force the player to confront hate and thus reduce their tendency toward it. However, Rubinstein has said she merely used this device as a means of ending the game.

Ashley Lower comments that the book discusses modern society's "pre-occupation with television".

== Sequels ==
Space Demons was the first of a three-part series. The second entry in the trilogy was Skymaze which was first published in 1989. The final entry in the series was Shinkei which was published in 1996.

== Adaptation ==
Space Demons was adapted as a play by Richard Tulloch in 1990. The play received similar critical acclaim to that of the novel.
