= Billy Sunday (novel) =

1995 novel by Australian writer Rod Jones

- Author: Rod Jones
- Language: English
- Genre: Fiction
- Publisher: Picador
- Publication date: 1995
- Publication place: Australia
- Media type: Print
- Pages: 293 pp.
- Awards: The Age Book of the Year Award - Fiction winner 1995
- ISBN: 0330356801
- Preceded by: Prince of the Lilies
- Followed by: Nightpictures

Billy Sunday (1995) is a novel by Australian writer Rod Jones. It was originally published by Picador in Australia in 1995.

== Synopsis ==
Billy Sunday is assistant to photographer Charles Van Schaick, who along with Frederick Jackson Turner, a budding historian, travel to the small town of Balsam Point, on the US western frontier, for the summer. There each are haunted by ghosts of the past, their own and those of the local, massacred Native Americans.

== Publishing history ==
After its initial publication in Australia by Picador in 1995, the novel was reprinted as by Henry Holt in the US in 1996.

== Critical reception ==
Writing in The Canberra Times Dorothy Johnston noted: "The frontier is everywhere in the novel, as a line or cutting edge in the US of the 1890s, and as a dividing line and barrier inside people, between the material and spiritual, between what is brutal and cruel and what is more kindly and responsible. The natural sounds of the forest are equated with the sounds of people crying...Perhaps Jones's special gift as a novelist is that of making his readers face the eroticism of violence."

The reviewer in Kirkus Reviews was not as impressed: "Too many disparate plot threads here to weave together tightly, and the attempt to catch America's identity crisis at the end of the century by focusing on these three men isn't persuasive. Still, the primary setting, an ancient forest in summer where pleasure and horror can almost merge, makes its presence keenly felt."

== Awards ==
- The Age Book of the Year Award - Fiction winner 1995

== See also ==
- 1995 in Australian literature
