= The Harsh Cry of the Heron =

2006 novel by Lian Hearn

- Author: Lian Hearn
- Language: English
- Series: Tales of the Otori trilogy
- Genre: Fantasy novel
- Publisher: Hachette Australia
- Publication date: 2006
- Publication place: Australia
- Media type: Print (Hardback & Paperback)
- Pages: 630 pp
- ISBN: 1-59448-923-8
- OCLC: 70265641
- Dewey Decimal: 823/.914 22
- LC Class: PR9619.3.H3725 H37 2006
- Preceded by: Brilliance of the Moon

The Harsh Cry of the Heron is the sequel to Lian Hearn's popular Tales of the Otori trilogy, first published on March 7, 2006. The novel is set sixteen years after the events of the Trilogy, and covers a period of about two years. It chronicles the events that ultimately lead to Takeo's downfall, in accordance with the prophecy spoken of him years before.

== Synopsis ==
Otori Takeo and Kaede are now the prosperous rulers of the Three Countries. Shigeko, their eldest daughter and heiress, will inherit the domain of Maruyama when she comes of age, and the Three Countries upon Takeo's death. Their younger daughters Maya and Miki are seen as cursed, due to superstitions concerning twins and their formidable Tribe talents. Although shunned by many, including their mother, they are loved by Takeo and Shigeko. Takeo's only fear is the prophecy concerning his death: he can only be killed by his son. His first, illegitimate son, Hisao (by Yuki) has been raised by the exiled Kikuta family, to one day be used to assassinate Takeo. Kaede soon becomes pregnant with Takeo's second son.

A new threat to Takeo has appeared. Takeo's vassal Arai Zenko and his wife Hana (Kaede's sister) have approached Saga Hideki, a warlord who has conquered most of the Eight Islands under the Emperor's mandate. Saga requests that Takeo submit himself to the Emperor and abdicate; Takeo and Kaede's son is born just before his departure for Miyako, the Imperial capital. Meanwhile, Muto Kenji, at the end of his years, attempts in vain to negotiate with Akio (the Kikuta Master) to see his grandson, Hisao. As Kenji attempts to flee with him he realizes Hisao is a ghostmaster, capable of communicating with the souls of the dead. The soul of his mother, Yuki, is haunting him. Unable to escape Akio, Kenji commits suicide. His death divides the Muto family's loyalty between Kenji's niece Shizuka (the mother of Zenko and Taku, loyal to Takeo) and Zenko, who secretly shelters Akio and Hisao in his capital of Kumamoto despite publicly submitting to Takeo. Zenko has also converted to Christianity in order to gain military support from Portuguese missionaries who Takeo has restricted to the port of Hofu.

Maya, whose Tribe talents are rather volatile, absorbs the spirit of a cat and struggles to control it, becoming increasingly erratic and dangerous. She and Miki are separated, and Maya is trained under Taku and his lover, Sada. Taku and Sada are killed on Zenko's orders by Akio and Hisao, who capture Maya near Hofu. Hisao, who exercises some control over Maya's cat spirit, is finally able to communicate with Yuki's spirit, but rejects her pleas to spare Takeo's life. Maya escapes aided by Miki, and they attempt to return to Hagi (the Otori capital) to reveal Zenko's treachery. Yuki's spirit aides them along their journey.

Rather than battle Saga's forces, Takeo and his retinue engage in a bowmanship contest in Miyako: the victor will rule the Three Countries. Due to Takeo's crippled hand, Shigeko takes his place. Shigeko wins, and Takeo departs in glory, leaving behind an exotic animal, a Kirin (likely a giraffe or an okapi), as a gift for the Emperor. However, the Kirin breaks free and follows Takeo's entourage, which is seen as an omen and a slight on the Emperor. Saga immediately pursues them. In the resulting battle, both sides endure great losses until Shigeko shoots Saga in the eye, and he retreats.

Maya, influenced by Yuki, slips into her parents' house and accidentally kills her infant brother with the Kikuta gaze; horrified, she flees. While Kaede is overcome with grief, Hana reveals the prophecy about Takeo's death, and the existence of Hisao. Furious, Kaede orders Shigeru's house burned to the ground, then leaves with Hana and her sons as Zenko's men destroy Hagi. After abdicating in favor of Shigeko, Takeo finds Kaede and tries to reason with her, but she calls the guards. Unwilling to fight his wife, Takeo retires to the temple at Terayama with Miki and his old friend Kubo Makoto. A few weeks later, Akio and Hisao come to kill him, but Hisao, armed with a handmade pistol, freezes and is unable to kill his father. Akio grabs the pistol, but Maya (trapped in her cat form) interferes, causing the gun to explode and kill them both. Takeo places a knife in Hisao's hands and stabs himself with it, bringing the prophecy of his death to fulfillment. He is ritually beheaded by Makoto with Jato (the Otori sword) and buried with honor, next to his adopted father Shigeru.

Following Takeo's abdication, Saga offers Shigeko a marriage-alliance allowing her to remain co-ruler in the Three Countries, which she accepts. The combined Saga and Otori armies defeat the Arai forces. Zenko and Hana commit seppuku, along with their youngest son, but at Kaede's request, Saga spares their other two sons as long as they renounce the Arai name. Kaede brings the boys to Terayama, where Makoto shows her his recorded account of Takeo's death. Overcome with guilt and grief, she prepares to commit suicide. Only Miki's appearance makes her decide to live, for the sake of all of Takeo's children.

== Characters ==
Otori Takeo was the protagonist of The Tales of the Otori. He is married to Shirakawa Kaede, with whom he jointly rules as overlord of the Three Countries. Takeo and Kaede practice benevolent and enlightened rule, rigidly controlling foreign trade and focusing on agriculture rather than conquest. Having been raised among the Hidden, the Tribe and the warrior class, Takeo is careful to follow no particular religion in order to prevent religious persecution. Although beloved by the commonfolk throughout his realm and approved by most of his retainers and many of the Muto family, he remains hated by the Kikuta family and the Arai Clan. He has three daughters, Shigeko, Maya, and Miki, and one illegitimate son: Kikuta Hisao, conceived by Muto Yuki, a past lover. He perishes at the end of the book after abdicating in favour of Maruyama Shigeko.

Otori Kaede (formerly Shirakawa Kaede) is Takeo's wife. She had a reputation of bringing death to all men that desired her, but Takeo had evaded death for some time. Kaede, despite being a woman in a male-dominated society, is proficient with both the sword and politics. She loves Shigeko dearly, but she harbors mistrust for her twin daughters and can only love them from a distance. Since she was not able to bear Takeo any sons, she is overjoyed when she later gives birth to a boy. But when the child dies mysteriously, her sister Hana tells her about Takeo's brief liaison with Muto Yuki, the son that was conceived, and the prophecy which foretells Takeo's death can only occur at the hands of his own son. Kaede violently rejects Takeo thereafter, only to mourn his death when she later recovers and proves that she still indeed loves him. She finally manages to reconcile with Miki (her only surviving child besides Shigeko) at the end of the book.

Otori Shigeko (later Maruyama Shigeko) is the eldest daughter of Takeo and Kaede, a wise and reverent young woman. She had been trained as a boy as a child in hopes of her inheriting the Three Countries as she came of age. She is the heiress and lady of the estates of Maruyama. Although she is much her mother's daughter, she loves her father and sisters dearly. Shigeko has always been fascinated by her sisters and always took their side of things. She is an expert archer and is in love with her senior retainer and teacher, Sugita Hiroshi. However, at the end of the novel, she becomes betrothed to Saga Hideki, the Emperor's commander, and inherits control the Three Countries and Takeo's sword, Jato.

Otori Maya is the daughter of Takeo and Kaede, and the twin of Miki. As a twin, she and her sister have been feared or frowned upon because of superstitious beliefs. She is very mischievous and possesses most, if not all, of Takeo's Tribe abilities. Because her mother fears Maya and Miki being together, one of them was always with the Tribe for training. As revenge for a man heartily welcoming Shigeko and blatantly ignoring the twins, Maya kills his cat with the Kikuta gaze and ends up taking the dead cat's spirit within her. After a great deal of practice, she eventually is able to take on the cat's form, but is continually haunted by cat's spirit threatening to take control of her. She accidentally kills her baby brother with the Kikuta gaze, which horrifies her so much she retreats permanently into the cat spirit. She is mortally wounded by Akio at the end of the book in an attempt to protect her father; Miki then mercy-kills her to prevent her being a cat spirit forever.

Otori Miki is the daughter of Takeo and Kaede, and the twin of Maya. She, being the younger of the two, was to be killed after she was born, but Takeo had forbidden it. Although she loves her mother, sisters, and father dearly, her mother is somewhat afraid of her. Miki had always been in the shadow of the more talented Maya, but had been quite comfortable with it. She is less mischievous and daring and more thoughtful and pragmatic than Maya; while she has a fiery temper, her twin is considered the colder and less forgiving twin. When together, they were inseparable. However, at the end of the novel, Miki was forced to kill her sister. Her mother finally accepts Miki at the end of the novel, when Kaede realizes that Miki still needs her.

Kikuta Hisao is the son of Takeo and Muto Yuki, and sixteen years old and, according to a prophecy, will be the one who kills Takeo. He had grown up believing he was the son of Akio, the Kikuta Master. Despite the talents of his mother and father, Hisao possesses no obvious talents like invisibility or the Kikuta hearing and was subjected to harsh training by Akio in hopes of compensating. He is by nature gentle and loves animals, which Akio cruelly punishes him for, and is innately talented at constructing tools, even if it is as complex as a gun. Muto Kenji, his maternal grandfather, discovers only as he dies in Hisao's presence that Hisao is a ghostmaster, a rare talent of the Tribe and that Yuki's spirit remains bound to him as a result. He is not able to hear his mother's pleas until his half-sister Maya aids him in her spirit form. Akio attempts to force him to shoot Takeo with a gun at the end of the novel, but it is Takeo who guides his son's hand with a dagger to kill Takeo and fulfill the prophecy. Hisao is later taken in by the monks at Terayama.

Madaren is the youngest half-sister of Takeo. She is an interpreter and lover of a visiting foreigner. After the Hidden were attacked, Madaren had been sold as a servant in one of the pleasure houses. She had learned to take advantage of them, and stole from them, eventually allowing a merchant to take her to Hofu. Returning to the pleasure houses to gain income, she was eventually bought by Don João, a Portuguese foreigner. Madaren got him to teach her their language, and she soon became fluent. She tried desperately to get her brother to convert back to the Hidden religion, with no success. She teaches Kaede the foreigners' language. As the foreigners and their religion were banished from the Three Countries by Shigeko and Saga at the end of the book, her fate is unknown.

Muto Shizuka is Takeo's cousin and the mother of Taku and Zenko, married to Dr. Ishida, Takeo's personal doctor. A skilled member of the Tribe, she is close friends with Kaede and a surrogate mother to Miki and Maya. When Muto Kenji is killed by Akio and the Kikuta clan, Takeo asks that she take on the role of the Master of the Muto clan. While she is respected by the Tribe, the decision is met with dislike from the Muto, Kuroda, and Imai clans, who feel that it is wrong for the new master to be chosen from outside the Tribe and it goes against tradition for a woman to lead, especially since Taku or Zenko would be eligible. When Taku is killed and Shizuka is betrayed by Zenko, she goes to mourn for Taku and fasts at a temple. Her suffering gains her much sympathy and causes many members of the Tribe to defect from Zenko.

Muto Taku is Shizuka's younger son and spymaster for the Muto, a close friend of Sugita Hiroshi. He is a talented member of the Tribe and well-trusted by Takeo. When Maya's abilities become too uncontrollable, she is entrusted to Taku and his companion (and lover) Sada, who train her to control the cat's spirit and take on its form. His relationship with Zenko is strained and the two do not get along well. Most members of the Tribe feel that Taku should have been the Muto Master instead of Shizuka and his death at the hands of Akio is a heavy loss for Takeo.

Arai Zenko is Shizuka's older son, Taku's older brother, and a vassal of Takeo and husband of Kaede's sister Hana. His relationship with his mother and brother are strained, though he still welcomes them as his family. As an outward gesture of loyalty, Zenko offers his sons Sunaomi and Chikara to be adopted by Takeo, knowing that they would be ineffective collateral against him because Takeo is unwilling to harm children. He is an ambitious and bitter man who still blames Takeo for the death of his father, Arai Daiichi. Zenko conspires to overthrow Takeo by several means: converting to Christianity in order to gain military support from foreign traders, allying with Akio, and declaring himself head of the Muto family after Kenji's death. While Takeo is busy fighting Saga Hideki, Zenko attacks the defenseless Otori lands, but he finally defeated by the combined armies of Saga and the Otori (who have formed an alliance). He eventually is forced to take his own life at the end of the novel.

Arai Hana (formerly Shirakawa Hana) is Kaede's youngest sister and wife of Arai Zenko, and mother of their three sons: Sunaomi, Chikara, and Hiromasa, who possesses Kikuta lines on his palms. After being rejected by Takeo in her youth, she married Zenko and came to love him and shared his ambition to overthrow Takeo and Kaede. Like her older sister, Hana is unusually beautiful, which resulted in a rivalry between Zenko, Taku, and Hiroshi as to who would marry her in their youth. She reveals to Kaede the secret of Takeo's son and the prophecy concerning Takeo's death in order to create a rift between the two and crush Takeo's spirit. Hana takes her life at the end of the book, along with her youngest son. Her two older sons are saved by Kaede and to be raised at the temple of Terayama.

Sugita Hiroshi is a loyal retainer of Takeo and Kaede, who has managed Maruyama in trust for Shigeko. He is in love with Shigeko, but does not pursue her hand in marriage because of his loyalty to Takeo and has not married any one else as a result. He and Taku have been close friends since childhood. When Hiroshi is badly injured in the battle against Saga Hideki, Shigeko attempts to kill Saga as revenge.

Kikuta Akio is the Kikuta Master, a cruel man who adheres too severely to the traditions of the Tribe and kills all who try to leave the Tribe. He is driven by fact he had to kill the only woman he ever loved, Muto Yuki, who did not love him in return, and his hatred of Takeo to the point of irrationality and demands all members of the Tribe refer to Takeo as the "Dog"; he kills any Tribe members who wish to negotiate with Takeo. While he has raised Hisao as his own son, Akio treats him harshly and with little kindness, brutally killing even a cat that Hisao befriended as an example. He molests Hisao habitually. He forms an alliance with Zenko, who claims mastery of the Muto family, in order to kill Takeo. Akio is ultimately cheated of his revenge when he and Hisao finally confront Takeo; he impatiently snatches a pistol away from Hisao to kill Takeo, but the gun misfires and explodes, blowing Akio's hands off and killing him.

Saga Hideki is a ruthless and pragmatic warlord from beyond the Three Countries. Having been declared the Emperor's general, he has conquered nearly all the rest of the "Eight Islands" on behalf of his powerless overlord, effectively making him shōgun. Saga, prompted by Zenko and Fujiwara Kono, challenges the legitimacy of Takeo's rule, intending to either force Takeo to abdicate or to crush him in battle. This plan initially fails when Takeo wins the Emperor's favor, and his daughter Shigeko wins the bowmanship contest on which the matter was to be decided. However, when the Kirin Takeo gifted to the Emperor escapes and follows him, Saga takes the opportunity to attack, claiming the Kirin's preference of Takeo is an insult to the Emperor. After a costly battle, Saga retreats after Shigeko shoots him in the eye. Impressed by both her and Takeo, he offers a marriage-alliance with Shigeko against the Arai clan after Takeo abdicates; Shigeko agrees, on condition that they rule equally in the Three Countries.

Muto Yuki (Muto Yusetsu) is the deceased mother of Kikuta Hisao and the daughter of Muto Kenji. When she was forced to kill herself, her spirit was bound to her infant son by his latent abilities as a ghostmaster. Having loved Takeo, she continually tries to contact Hisao and convince him to spare his father. Hisao is only able to communicate with his mother with the help of Maya, but ends up rejecting Yuki's request and severs her spirit. Yuki later appears to Maya and Miki as "Yusetsu" and becomes a surrogate mother to them as they try to return to Kaede and warn her of Hana and Zenko's treachery. Miki is wary of Yuki's intentions while Maya readily accepts the ghost woman's help until it is revealed that Yuki was using Maya to take revenge on Kaede. Yuki influences Maya to use the Kikuta sleep on her infant brother and steals the baby's spirit away, leaving Maya to give into the cat's spirit, devastated by the weight of her actions. Yuki nonetheless intervenes again when Hisao confronts Takeo, attempting to stop him from murdering his father.

== Reception ==
In a review of The Harsh Cry of the Heron, Kirkus Reviews wrote "Previously, the series built inexorably and carefully toward the final cataclysmic confrontation, but here, it all takes too long to get moving. Only near the end of this overlong narrative do the gears begin to catch.". A Publishers Weekly review stated "Hearn seamlessly fuses fact and fantasy to create a sprawling, bewitching realm of magic."

The Harsh Cry of the Heron was also reviewed by Booklist, Books+Publishing, and the Historical Novel Society.

It received an honourable mention Aurealis Award for best fantasy novel, and was shortlisted in the 2007 Australian Book Industry Awards Australian General Fiction Book of the Year.

== See also ==
- Tales of the Otori
- Heaven’s Net is Wide
