= Brilliance of the Moon =

Book by Gillian Rubinstein

- Author: Lian Hearn
- Language: English
- Series: Tales of the Otori
- Genre: Fantasy novel
- Publisher: Hodder Headline
- Publication date: 2004
- Publication place: Australia
- Media type: Print (Hardback & Paperback)
- Pages: 400 pp
- ISBN: 0-7336-1564-3
- OCLC: 62537719
- Preceded by: Grass for His Pillow
- Followed by: The Harsh Cry of the Heron

Brilliance of the Moon is the third novel in Lian Hearn's Tales of the Otori trilogy, published in 2004. It describes the events during the months following Takeo and Kaede's marriage at the end of the second book, Grass for His Pillow, leading to Takeo's confrontation with the warlord Arai Daiichi. A period of about eight months is covered, from Spring to the onset of Winter.

== Plot summary ==
Soon after Kaede and Takeo's marriage, messengers arrive at Terayama from his Uncles with a threat, and the head of Ichiro, his old teacher. The Otori army lies in wait to ambush him, so Takeo leads them over the mountains, and across the river near Kibi, with the assistance of a bridge made by Jo-an and some outcasts. His second-in-command is the homosexual monk Makoto, a friend of his from Terayama; Makoto criticizes many of Takeo's unorthodox methods, but nonetheless is very loyal to him. After a minor skirmish with some bandits, they lead the army to Maruyama, the domain that Lady Maruyama left to Kaede. Lady Maruyama's son-in-law, Iida Nariaki, a cousin to Iida Sadamu, has marched in to Maruyama just ahead of them, but Iida's army gets caught between the Maruyama and Takeo's armies, and are defeated. Takeo takes up Maruyama as his base of operations, and he and Kaede prepare to restore the domain

Meanwhile, Shizuka and Kondo Kiichi arrive at the hidden Muto village, and are reunited with her uncle, Kenji, and her two sons. She fears the consequences that will come from Kaede's rash marriage. From Kenji she learns of the Kikuta's belief in the existence of records on the tribe compiled by Shigeru before his death. They decide to send Kondo to Arai, to gauge his reaction to Kaede's marriage, and his feeling towards his sons by Shizuka. Kenji also tells her how his daughter Yuki was recently married to Akio but was forced to take her life after her son by Takeo was born, because the Kikuta were suspicious of her love for Takeo. The child will remain with the Kikuta, who have their own plans concerning the boy and Takeo's futures. Kenji's grief at his daughter's death has caused him to split from the Kikuta; regretful of his betrayal of Shigeru, he now tries to rally the other families of the Tribe to help Takeo.

In Maruyama, they start restoring the land and estates. Takeo is threatened by the local Tribe members, so using Shigeru's records, he has them rounded up and the adults executed. His mind turns to Hagi, and he concocts a plan to invade it by sea. He travels to Oshima island to meet his childhood friend Terada Fumio, whose family have now become pirates, to seek an alliance. Kaede wants to accompany him, but he tells her to stay. On the way he meets Ryoma, an illegitimate son of his Uncle, Masahiro. He makes an agreement with Fumio's father, but his return is delayed by typhoons, and he almost drowns in a storm.

Despite Sugita's objections, Kaede rides to Shirakawa with Hiroshi, and finds that Shoji, the Shirakawa retainer, had given up her sisters to Fujiwara, and returned her hostage to his family. Shocked, she hides the records on the Tribe at the nearby Shrine, and rides to demand her sisters return. Fujiwara abducts her, and only Hiroshi escapes to later bring the news to Maruyama. Fujiwara declares her marriage to Takeo to be illegal, and he forces her to marry him. Their marriage is celibate: he is not interested in her as a woman, but as a treasure, to be locked away, well-cared for but not given any information. However, one of Shizuka's cousins manages to bring Kaede messages for a time- until Fujiwara discovers her and has her murdered.

Takeo returns and hears the news of Kaede's abduction. His army marches towards Shirakawa, but discovers not only Fujiwara's garrison, but Arai's larger army. Caught between them, Takeo is defeated but manages to extract his forces. They retreat to the coast as Maruyama surrenders to Arai's men, hoping for Fumio to come by boat, but the weather delays him. Takeo submits to Arai, but rather than killing him, they enter into an alliance against the Otori lords (Shigeru's uncles), but to dispel rumors about him being one of the hidden, Takeo is forced to kill the outcast Jo-an. Kenji, turned against the Kikuta because of the murder of his daughter, comes to Takeo and brings a truce, and an alliance on behalf of the Tribe, save the Kikuta. Before they leave, Fumio demonstrates to Takeo the use of a firearm, an invention obtained from the white barbarians.

Arai's army marches north, and Takeo sails around the coast to Hagi. With Kenji and Taku, Arai and Shizuka's younger son, they sneak into the castle, and kill the lords and their families. When Arai's army arrives, he betrays Takeo; he intended to use Takeo to take out the Otori Lords for him, removing the last obstacle to his total rule of the Three Countries. Enraged, Takeo threatens to kill Arai's sons Zenko and Taku (who are standing next to him) which makes Arai pause. Fumio shoots Arai dead with the firearm, and at that moment a huge earthquake rocks the entire three countries. It destroys Arai's army, and in Shirakawa it destroys Fujiwara and his household in an example of Deus ex machina. Kondo Kiichi, in a last act of loyalty to Kaede, sacrifices himself to hold Fujiwara inside his burning house. However, Kaede's oiled hair accidentally catches fire.

The Kikuta master, Kotaro, sneaks into Takeo's house to assassinate him, as he did to his father years before. With Kenji and Taku's help, they defeat him, but Takeo loses 2 fingers, and goes into a delirium from the poisoned blade that cut him. After he recovers, and despite the onset of winter, he rushes south to find what happened to Kaede. Makoto, his longtime friend, decides to leave him, but promises to continue to pray for him and for all his people at the temple. They come to the shrine to find Kaede, Shizuka, and her new husband Dr Ishida alive, with the tribal records safe. But Kaede's hair is shorn, terrible burns marring her neck; Takeo gently covers her scars with his maimed hand. As it starts to snow, Takeo prays the spring would bring healing to their lands and their marriage.

== Afterword ==
A short epilogue, 15 years after the events of the book, closes off the trilogy, and sets the scene for the sequel, The Harsh Cry of the Heron. Takeo is co-ruler of the Three Countries with Kaede, and they have three daughters. He has not told Kaede of his son by Yuki and knows if his destiny is to die at his hands, he cannot avoid it.

== Reception ==
Kirkus Reviews wrote "There is heroism, to be sure, and many a noble speech, but there are also a sadness and an acknowledgement of human folly that raise Hearn's writing far above where it's been before.", and Publishers Weekly called it "elegant". A reviewer in The New York Times however, referred to it as "a blood-soaked novel", and that it "more closely resemble a movie treatment than a novel."

Brilliance of the Moon has also been reviewed by Booklist, the Historical Novel Society, School Library Journal, and the Seattle Post-Intelligencer.

It was shortlisted for the 2004 Aurealis Award for best fantasy novel.

== See also ==
- Tales of the Otori
