= Heaven's Net Is Wide =

Book by Gillian Rubinstein

- Author: Lian Hearn
- Language: English
- Series: Tales of the Otori
- Genre: Fantasy novel
- Publisher: Hachette Australia (Aus) and Pan Macmillan (UK)
- Publication date: 2007
- Publication place: Australia
- Media type: Print
- Pages: 641pp
- ISBN: 978-0-7336-2144-4 (Aus); ISBN 978-0-230-01397-1 (UK)
- OCLC: 174100617
- Followed by: Across the Nightingale Floor

Heaven’s Net is Wide is a prequel to Lian Hearn's popular Tales of the Otori series. It recounts the life of Lord Shigeru from the age of 12 (the year in which Takeo is born). It begins with the murder of Kikuta Isamu, Takeo's father, and includes Shigeru's training with Matsuda Shingen, the battle of Yaegahara, the role of Muto Shizuka, the meeting with Lady Maruyama, and other events foreshadowing Across the Nightingale Floor. It concludes with Shigeru and Takeo's meeting which begins the series.

== Synopsis ==
The following divisions are not so marked in the novel, but are included below to separate the logical sections of the plot.

=== Introduction ===
Kikuta Isamu has embraced the religion of The Hidden, and made a new life in Mino, a secret village. He is tracked down by his cousin Kotaro, who tells him he is sentenced to death for leaving The Tribe. Isamu leads him on a chase, but when finally cornered, refuses to defend himself. Kotaro kills him, but is later haunted by Isamu's words of forgiveness, and wonders if the man had left a child.

12 year old Shigeru visits his mother's house in Hagi when Endo Akira runs up, saying that Shigeru's brother Takeshi and Mori Yuta had fallen in the river and not resurfaced. Shigeru dives in with an unknown girl (later revealed as Akane), and they manage to save Takeshi, but Yuta is dead. After the funeral, Yuta's father offers to kill himself in exchange. Shigeru's step-uncles believe the whole family should be put to death, and their property confiscated. Shigemori, who is Lord Otori and Shigeru's father, agrees with Shigeru that the proposed punishment is excessive, and the sons enter their service instead. From this day, Shigeru mistrusts his uncles.

=== Shigeru's training ===
When aged 15, he and his best friend are caught sleeping with a maid, and he is warned by his father of the dangers of illegitimate children vying for inheritance. Indeed, over 30 years ago, Shigemori fell into the same trap with a woman from the Tribe, and ever since he has feared his child's reappearance. He sends Shigeru to Matsuda Shingen, former warrior and now priest at Terayama, for instruction. On the way, events lead Shigeru to suspect Lord Noguchi, an Otori ally, of treachery. War with the Tohan seems inevitable.

He arrives at Terayama, and there is treated the same as any other novice. He is on the point of leaving in frustration when Matsuda takes him into the wilderness for training of the mind, and later, of the body. A houou bird visits and leaves a feather, an omen of peace, though the stain of blood suggests that Shigeru's death will be in the cause of justice. Later, in a training fight, Shigeru knocks Matsuda unconscious, and runs for help. He encounters a member of the Tribe, known as The Fox, who can make himself invisible, and who gives him some herbs that speed Matsuda's recovery. When Matsuda wakes he warns Shigeru that, from the Tribe, the herbs could just as easily been poison.

One evening, they are approached by two men on horseback. They are looking for Matsuda, and one challenges him to a fight, to prove he is the better swordsman and for insulting the Tohan Lord by not coming to Inuyama to tutor his son. Matsuda replies that Shigeru is his better, and so the man should fight Shigeru. Shigeru kills the man easily—his first kill—and sends the other man back to report on what happened. They return to Terayama to discover the old Abbot in dead: Matsuda is installed as his successor. Autumn passes, before Winter closes in.

=== Coming of age ===
The stone bridge at Hagi is completed, and to appease the spirits, the stonemason is sealed inside. His daughter, Akane, is a courtesan at Haruna's establishment, and is consoled by her favourite client, Hayato. He wishes to marry her, but Shigeru provides money for her and her family, and overtures are made for her to be his concubine. She turns Hayato away, but Shigeru travels with his men to the border with the Tohan.

There he finds people belonging to a sect known as The Hidden. Tohan warriors have been entering Otori land, and submitting the members of the sect to torture. Shigeru learns from a survivor and his family the beliefs of the Hidden. They come across some Tohan with their Lord, Iida Sadamu, trapped in a cave. They rescue him, in return for a promise to honour the borders. They believe, however, it will be a promise not honoured.

On his return he received reprobation from his father and uncles. Akane becomes his concubine, and he builds a special house for her to live in. His mother soon moves into the palace and organises a wedding for him to Yanagi Moe. In jealousy, Akane obtains a charm which makes Moe shrink in terror when Shigeru attempts to consummate the marriage. Hayato pleads with Akane to come away with him, but she refuses. By the next day, he had cursed the Otori in Shigeru's uncle's hearing, and was killed. With his entire family under a death sentence, Akane pleads for mercy on their behalf: in return, she agrees to report on Shigeru's actions, though she hopes not to betray her lover.

=== Alliances ===
Shigeru grants the Hidden man, Nesutoro, permission to join fellow believers in the west, while Takeshi tells him that people fear their father's indecisiveness. Shigeru entrusts patrolling of the eastern border to the Noguchi and Kitano, while he prepares to meet secretly with Seishuu Lords to discuss alliances. Masahiro comes to Akane again for more news, and she tells him that Shigeru plans to meet someone from the Arai or Maruyama.

Shigeru sets off, dropping his wife at her father's house on the way. In Yamagata he is met by Muto Shizuka of the Tribe. Under the pretense of a day's hawking, she leads them out to meet Arai Daiichi, her lover. Despite a friendly meeting, he was unable to garner open support from the Arai. Later, in her role as member of the Tribe, Shizuka delivers a letter from Iida to the Noguchi which will almost ensure the Otori defeat.

Shigeru journeys to Terayama, where Takeshi is to be trained, and also to be out of harms way if war breaks out. There he meets Maruyama Naomi, leader of a clan inherited through the female line, and they between them agree to an alliance. She also reveals that The Hidden in her domain are under her protection.

Shigeru returns to Hagi and convinces Shigemori, with his mother's help, to send his untrustworthy uncles away, however the uncles procrastinate until winter prevents the journey. By the time Spring comes, however, his uncles are only too happy to depart to their estates, having told Akane it won't be for long. Shigemori impresses on Shigeru the imperative to live on if, in the impending battle, the ancestral sword Jato comes to him.

=== The Battle of Yaegahara ===
The Otori army of 5000 men left Hagi, Shigeru receiving an emotional farewell from Akane, and a cold one from his wife. They met the Tohan army, who had already razed Chigawa, at the plain of Yaegahara. They are betrayed by their own forces: the Kitano who failed to attack the Tohan as they passed, and the Noguchi who openly attack the Otori, killing Shigeru's friend Kiyoshige and taking his head. Hemmed in on two sides, the Otori suffer heavy losses, including his father Shigemori.

Defeated, Shigeru retreats to a stream where he prepares to take his own life. However The Fox (Kenji), the member of the Tribe he met some years ago, finds him and brings him Jato, retrieved from near his father's body. Thus determined to escape, he follows Kenji through the wilderness to a secret village of the tribe, where he recuperates. Shigeru gradually trusts him, despite Kenji's associations, and realises that to survive, he would need to be devious, and patient.

Shigeru's uncles return to Hagi and were installed as interim regents, and requested Lord Kitano, who was the most neutral of the Lords, to act as an intermediary between them and Iida Sadamu. Masahiro comes to Akane, tells her that Shigeru was dead or captured, and rapes her. In despair for her loss and her part in it, she kills the priest who gave her the charm, and casts herself into the mouth of a volcano.

Shigeru rides to the castle with a great procession behind him. His wife, bitter at the death of her family in battle, tells him of Akane's fate. With most of his friends and advisors dead, he battled to keep a calm demeanour as he met with his uncles and other senior advisors. Kitano arrives the next day to negotiate terms: Shigeru's abdication and retirement, the ceding of territory, and later, the taking of hostages from the Seishuu to ensure their loyalty.

=== The farmer ===
Shigeru and his wife begin a distorted sexual relationship, she deliberately inciting his anger, and then submitting to it. She conceives, after which they rarely speak. He seeks permission to retrieve Takeshi from Terayama, and after receiving evasive replies, he travels anonymously through the mountains. The brothers honour their father's death there during the festival, and Shigeru plans to take on the persona of a harmless Farmer, giving him time to patiently wait for his revenge.

After they return, Moe, Shigeru's wife, dies with her baby during childbirth, which sends him into depression. Shizuka, now a mother, hears that Kikuta Kotaro killed Lady Maruyama's child, which marks the turning point in her loyalty. Shigeru starts compiling records on the tribe, and later Shizuka comes to him as an informer, secretly assisting him.

Across the three countries, Shigeru's Farmer persona has been accepted, though some look to him for salvation, or at least to act like a Lord. After Takeshi becomes rebellious, he is taken into Miyoshi Satoru's household for training. Shigeru receives a mysterious note from Lady Maruyama. After an assassination attempt on his life is foiled, he meets her at a remote shrine, and they begin a secretive relationship. They meet only occasionally, and when a lone Yanagi warrior attempts to kill Iida Sadamu, it becomes too dangerous to even write. They spend six years apart, during which time Lady Maruyama's daughter Mariko is taken hostage in Iida's castle, and Shirakawa Kaede likewise resides at Noguchi.

=== Conclusion ===
At Noguchi castle, Arai Daiichi is becoming impatient, and Naomi fears that anything rash may endanger her and Mariko. She travels with Shizuka to Yamagata, and the two women confide their fears and plans to each other. Naomi continues on alone to Terayama, where she has an unexpected meeting with Shigeru. Afterwards she goes to Inuyama to visit her daughter, but cannot stay, as she has conceived a child to Shigeru. Knowing that bearing his son would be disaster for them all, she sends word to Shizuka, and she rushes back to Maruyama.

Shizuka comes and gives Naomi a herbal concoction which terminates the pregnancy. She is comforted by Sachie and her sister Eriko, who are both members of The Hidden, and she becomes one of them. Word comes from a travelling peddler, a member of The Hidden, who met a boy in Mino, who looks like an Otori. Shizuka sets off at once for Hagi and brings Shigeru the news, who resolves to rescue him from likely persecution from Iida's men, with the knowledge that if the boy inherited his family's skills, he may be the assassin he has been waiting for.

Before he can go, his mother dies of a fever; Shigeru also suffers from it, but slowly recovers. In the meantime, Takeshi is killed in a fight in Yamagata and is later buried at Terayama. Iida rewards his killers. Shigeru makes the long journey cross-country to Mino, where he is just in time to rescue the boy, Tomasu, from Iida's men who had already destroyed Tomasu's village. He renames him Takeo, and plans to adopt him, and together they would destroy Iida Sadamu.

== Reception ==
Ursula K Le Guin, in The Guardian, compared Hearn's style of writing to that of Alexandre Dumas, and concluded ".. Lian Hearn has written a saga that will continue to give pleasure to many." Kirkus Reviews wrote "As impressive an ending as it is a beginning.", and Publishers Weekly called it "lyrical and moving".

It has also been reviewed by the Historical Novel Society, FT Magazine, Vector, and received a somewhat critical review from the Literary Review.

It won the 2007 Aurealis Award for best fantasy novel.

== See also ==
- Tales of the Otori
- The Harsh Cry of the Heron
