= Selected Poems : 1956–1994 =

1995 Australian poetry collection by Chris Wallace-Crabbe

- Author: Chris Wallace-Crabbe
- Language: English
- Genre: Poetry collection
- Publisher: Oxford University Press
- Publication date: 1995
- Publication place: Australia
- Media type: Print
- Pages: 116 pp
- Awards: 1995 The Age Book of the Year – Poetry Prize, winner
- ISBN: 0192824120

Selected Poems : 1956–1994 is a collection of poems by Australian poet Chris Wallace-Crabbe, published by Oxford University Press in 1995.

The collection contains 117 poems reprinted from several of the author's previous poetry collections.

It was the winner of the 1995 The Age Book of the Year – Poetry Prize.

== Contents ==
- "Citizen"
- "Ancient Historian"
- "Practical Politics"
- "The Wife's Story"
- "A Wintry Manifesto"
- "In Light and Darkness"
- "Every Night About This Time"
- "Wind and Change"
- "The Swing"
- "Melbourne"
- "A Sentimental Education"
- "Carnations"
- "Nature, Language, the Sea : An Essay"
- "Traditions, Voyages (Australian to Jamaican)"
- "The Apparition"
- "The Threat"
- "The Centaur Within"
- "The Joker"
- "In Hay Fever Season (In Hay Fever Time)"
- "Losses and Recoveries"
- "Evening at San Miguel"
- "Other People"
- "Last Page from an Explorer's Journal"
- "Real Estate"
- "The Men of Meat"
- "The Wild Colonial Puzzler"
- "It"
- "Again"
- "Meditation with Memories"
- "Hey, There"
- "The Collective Invention"
- "Keeping One's Head"
- "Genesis"
- "The Shape-Changer"
- "Bennelong"
- "New Carpentry"
- "Puck in January"
- "Pantuns"
- "In the Wilderness"
- "Old Men During a Fall of Government"
- "Now That April's Here (for Peter Steele)"
- "The Mental Traveller's Landfall"
- "Introspection"
- "Gaspard de la Nuit"
- "Mind"
- "Abhorring a Vacuum"
- "Nub"
- "Exit the Players"
- "Five Easy Pieces : Artichoke (The Bits and Pieces : Artichoke)"
- "Five Easy Pieces : Banana (The Bits and Pieces : Banana)"
- "The Bits and Pieces : City"
- "The Bits and Pieces : Doiley"
- "The Bits and Pieces : Emus"
- "The Bits and Pieces : Foot"
- "Five Easy Pieces : Galvo (The Bits and Pieces : Galvo)"
- "The Bits and Pieces : Hair"
- "The Bits and Pieces : Ink"
- "The Bits and Pieces : Jasmine"
- "The Bits and Pieces : Kelp"
- "The Bits and Pieces : Lava"
- "The Bits and Pieces : Marmalade"
- "The Bits and Pieces : Nectarines"
- "The Bits and Pieces : Opener"
- "The Bits and Pieces : Passionfruit"
- "The Bits and Pieces : Quail"
- "The Bits and Pieces : Roses"
- "The Bits and Pieces : Skies"
- "The Bits and Pieces : Telephone"
- "Five Easy Pieces : Underwear (The Bits and Pieces : Underwear)"
- "The Bits and Pieces : Veils"
- "The Bits and Pieces : Washing Machine"
- "The Bits and Pieces: X"
- "Five Easy Pieces : Yams (The Bits and Pieces : Yams)"
- "The Bits and Pieces : Zephyr"
- "Panoptics"
- "Practitioners of Silence"
- "Sacred Ridges Above Diamond Creek (for Les Murray and for My Pocket Tape Recorder)"
- "A Stone Age Decadent"
- "The Amorous Cannibal"
- "The Well-Dreamed Man"
- "There"
- "The Starlight Express"
- "A Glimpse of Shere Khan"
- "Genius Loci"
- "Sonnets to the Left"
- "The Mirror Stage"
- "Stardust"
- "God"
- "The Lorelei"
- "The Thing Itself"
- "They"
- "An Elegy"
- "The Life of Ideas (in memoriam A.F. Davies)"
- "The Inheritance"
- "Mental Events"
- "River Run (for Kevin Hart)"
- "The Evolution of Tears"
- "The Sound"
- "For Crying Out Loud"
- "Puck Disembarks"
- "The Bush"
- "And the World Was Calm"
- "Like Vibrations of a Bell"
- "Trace Elements"
- "Afternoon in the Central Nervous System"
- "Opera with Phantoms"
- "Free Will"
- "Call Me Jack"
- "Garth McLeod Brooding"
- "Sunset Sky Near Cooper Pedy"
- "Looking Down on Cambodia"
- "Reality"
- "Dusky Tracts"
- "Ode to Morpheus"
- "Morpheus Replies"
- "What Are These Coming to the Sacrifice?"
- "Why Do We Exist?"

== Critical reception ==
In a review of the collection for The Age newspaper, David McCooey called Chris Wallace-Crabbe "a wild-card in the pack of Australian poetry, erudite and enough of a larrikin to send Puck down under." The review went on to note the small number of poems selected, the "severe pruning lays bare some key themes, most obviously an interest in language and the linguistic construction of reality."

== Notes ==
- Dedication: For Peter Steele
- Epigraph: 'Bless what there is for being.' -- W.H. Auden
- After the poet's win of the 1995 The Age Book of the Year – Poetry Prize he was interviewed for The Age newspaper by Fiona Capp

== See also ==
- 1995 in Australian literature
