= Tales of the Otori =

Novel series by Lian Hearn

- Across the Nightingale Floor; Grass for His Pillow; Brilliance of the Moon; The Harsh Cry of the Heron; Heaven's Net Is Wide
- Author: Lian Hearn
- Country: Australia
- Language: English
- Genre: Historical fantasy
- Publisher: Hachette Australia (Aus)
- Published: 2002–2007
- Media type: Print (hardcover and paperback)

Tales of the Otori is a series of historical fantasy novels by Gillian Rubinstein, writing under the pen name Lian Hearn, set in a fictional world based on feudal Japan. The series initially consisted of a trilogy: Across the Nightingale Floor (2002), Grass for His Pillow (2003), and Brilliance of the Moon (2004). It was followed in 2006 by a sequel, The Harsh Cry of the Heron, and in 2007 by a prequel, Heaven's Net Is Wide. In 2020, two new books were published in a sequel series called Children of the Otori, Orphan Warriors and Sibling Assassins.

The books follow a young warrior named Takeo in his struggles to avenge his adoptive father, escape the legacy of his biological father, and pursue the love of his life in the midst of an enormous power struggle involving dozens of clan lords and thousands of warriors.

== Synopsis ==
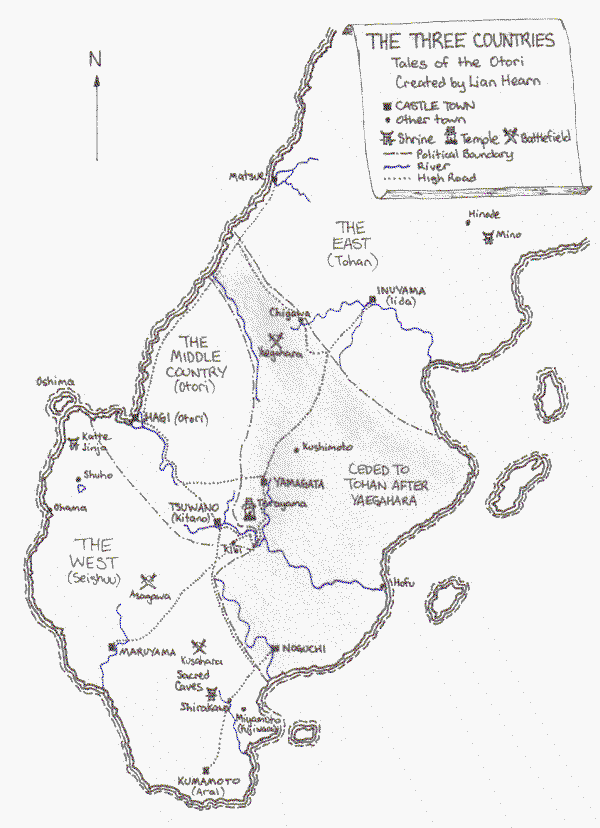
Map of the Three Countries

"Five battles to fight. Four to win, one to lose."

=== The trilogy ===
The story is told primarily in first-person narrative by Otori Takeo. He was born as Tomasu in Mino, a small village that houses amongst its people, religious outcasts referred to as the "Hidden". The Hidden are persecuted throughout the Three Countries for their beliefs, and in the opening chapter Mino is destroyed by the warriors of Iida Sadamu, Lord of the Tohan Clan. Takeo is rescued by Otori Shigeru, a young Lord of the Otori Clan which has a long-standing rivalry with the Tohan, and led back to the Otori stronghold of Hagi. There, Shigeru adopts Takeo and begins to instruct him in the ways of a warrior.

Shigeru's uncles, hoping to rid themselves of their popular and powerful nephew, send him to Iida's capital city of Inuyama, ostensibly to be married to a young princess from a different clan named Kaede. Unexpectedly, Kaede and Takeo fall in love at first sight. As the delegation arrives at Inuyama, it is revealed that Takeo's biological Father was of The Tribe, a group of families with special powers, and they abduct Takeo, making a claim upon him because of his ancestry. Takeo strikes a deal with them and escapes them, but he arrives too late: Shigeru is betrayed and killed, Iida ultimately perishes at Kaede's hand after attempting to rape her, and the country is overrun by the army of Arai Daiichi.

Takeo is torn between conflicting obligations: to avenge Shigeru's death and claim leadership of the Otori clan; to submit to the Tribe's claim on him; and to follow his heart and marry Shirakawa Kaede. These conflicts drive his actions throughout the trilogy, placing him at odds with the Tribe, the Otori Lords, and the armies of Arai Daiichi.

For a more detailed synopsis, see the individual entries for each novel:

- Across the Nightingale Floor
- Grass for His Pillow
- Brilliance of the Moon

=== The Harsh Cry of the Heron ===
Sixteen years later, Takeo is ruler of the Three Countries, and has three daughters: Shigeko, and twins Maya and Miki (the latter two have inherited tribal skills from their Kikuta bloodline).

Arai Zenko (Daiichi's son) and his wife Hana (Kaede's youngest sister) plot for Takeo's overthrow with the help of the leader of the Kikuta, Akio, and Takeo's secret teenage son by Muto Yuki, Hisao. Hisao was raised by Akio, and is a ghostmaster, able to communicate with the dead, including his dead mother.

After Muto Kenji dies, the loyalty of the Tribe clans to Takeo starts to wane. Despite installing Shigeko as Lady Maruyama and winning over the Emperor, his army is forced to battle the Emperor's general, Lord Saga, while Zenko raises an army in alliance with the western barbarians. Kaede bears a son, but after he dies, and Hana reveals to her that Hisao is Takeo's son, she is driven temporarily insane. Now against Takeo, she destroys the castle at Hagi, and seeks sanctuary with Arai and Hana.

Takeo seeks sanctuary at Terayama, where he is attacked by Akio and Hisao. At the crucial moment Hisao freezes; Akio takes the gun, which explodes in his hands, killing himself and fatally wounding Maya. Takeo, acknowledging that it is his time, holds a knife in Hisao's hand and falls upon it, ensuring the prophecy of his death is fulfilled. Shigeko enters into a treaty with Saga, whose army defeats Arai Zenko, and she will marry him as part of the bargain to ensure peace. They will be co-rulers in the Three Countries. In remorse, Kaede considers taking her own life, but at the last moment decides to live on for the sake of her daughter Miki.

=== Heaven's Net is Wide ===
This prequel begins about 17 years before the start of the trilogy, and ends at Takeo's and Shigeru's meeting that begins Across the Nightingale Floor. It follows Shigeru's childhood, his training with Matsuda Shingen, and his coming of age. Frustrated by his father's indecision and his uncle's obscure motives, he takes a band of warriors to the border with the Tohan, and discovers a village of the Hidden, tortured and killed by the Tohan. He encounters the belief system of the Hidden, and meets Iida Sadamu for the first time, sparing his life.

Later, the novel covers his brief turbulent marriage, his relationship with the courtesan Akane, and the battle of Yaegahara. The Noguchi betray them, ensuring the Otori defeat, and victory for Iida Sadamu. Otori Shigemori perishes, but Jato, the ancestral sword, finds its way to his son Shigeru, via a member of the Tribe, Muto Kenji. Shigeru is forced to abdicate, and he patiently waits for an opportunity to avenge his father. Under the guise of a simple farmer, he secretly compiles records on the Tribe, assisted by Muto Shizuka, and conducts a covert relationship with Maruyama Naomi.

== Characters ==
=== The Otori ===
- Otori Takeo: born to the Hidden as Tomasu, but given the name Takeo after his rescue from an attack on his village. Son of Kikuta Isamu and heir to Isamu's many supernatural talents. Nephew and adopted son of Otori Shigeru and legal heir to lordship of the Otori clan. Husband to Shirakawa Kaede and leader of a small army during his campaign to claim lordship of the Otori.
- Otori Shigeru: adoptive father and uncle of Otori Takeo. Heir to leadership of the Otori before his death at the hands of Iida Sadamu at Inuyama. Keeps records of the Tribe before his death, which Takeo uses during his later conflicts with the Tribe.
- Otori Ichiro: previously a teacher and somewhat advisor to Shigeru, later a teacher to Takeo.
- Otori Shigeko: first daughter of Takeo and Kaede, heir of both Maruyama and the Three Lands. Appears at the Harsh Cry Of The Heron. She falls in love with her teacher, Sugita Hiroshi, but, in the end, she marries Lord Saga to save her land.
- Otori Maya: one of the twins, Shigeko's younger sister. She has inherited, just like her twin sister, Miki, her father's supernatural powers. The spirit of a cat lives inside her since she killed the cat's body by using her powers, and now she can transform into a cat whenever she wants to. She is killed while trying to prevent Akio from killing Takeo.
- Otori Miki: twin sister of Maya. They both have their father's powers. She is the only one who can make Maya turn into her physical form.
- Miyoshi Kahei: son of Miyoshi Satoru (an elder of the Hagi clan) and was a friend of Takeshi (Shigeru's late brother)
- Miyoshi Gemba: his younger brother, both later friends of Takeo
- Otori Shoichi: Shigeru's uncle who, along with his brother, was an advisor to Lord Shigemori (Shigeru's father) during his reign, then after the Battle of Yaegahara becomes lord of the Otori clan
- Otori Masahiro: his younger brother, who seemingly has the same power as Shoichi. Had a particular hatred for Shigeru as he fancied his concubine Lady Akane. Has a son; Otori Yoshitomi
- Terada Fumifusa/Fumimasa: head of the Hagi fishing fleet, later becoming a pirate residing on the island of Oshima to avoid the increased tax established by the Otori lords
- Terada Fumio: his son, and a friend of Takeo

=== The Tohan ===
- Iida Sadamu: leader of the Tohan clan. Enemy of Otori Shigeru, due to longstanding jealousy and hatred, also responsible for Shigeru's death. Killed by Shirakawa Kaede shortly after Shigeru's body is liberated by Takeo from Inuyama castle.

=== The Seishuu ===
- Arai Daiichi: As an old friend of Kaede's from her time in the Noguchi household, he is a Seishuu warlord who rises to power in the void left after Iida Sadamu's death. Seeks to conquer the Three Countries and to destroy the Tribe.
- Shirakawa Kaede: cousin of Maruyama Naomi and heir to Maruyama after the death of Naomi and her daughter. Lover and wife of Otori Takeo. She has two younger sisters, Ai and Hana.
- Maruyama Naomi: secret lover of Otori Shigeru and head of the western domain of Maruyama, which is traditionally inherited by females. She has a daughter, Mariko, and is accompanied by her maid and retainer, Sugita Sachie.
- Sugita Haruki: Sachie's brother, senior retainer to the Maruyama
- Sugita Hiroshi: his nephew, taken into Takeo's army and care at the age of 10 when his family were killed by the army of Iida Nariaki (Sadamu's cousin.) In the sequel to the series; The Harsh Cry of the Heron, he is a loyal retainer to Takeo and Kaede, holding the Maruyama domain for the next female heir to inherit, and a friend of Muto Taku (Shizuka and Arai's son). He is in love with Takeo's daughter, Shigeko.

=== The Tribe ===
- Muto Kenji: master of the Muto Tribe family. Takeo's teacher in Hagi. Father of Muto Yuki and uncle of Muto Shizuka.
- Muto Yuki: Kenji's daughter and mother of Takeo's first son. She delivers Jato, Shigeru's sword, to Takeo and takes Shigeru's head to Terayama, where Shigeru will be honoured after death. She is executed by the Tribe after giving birth to Takeo's son, who the Kikuta believe will not be raised to hate Takeo if he is raised in the presence of Yuki.
- Muto Shizuka: aide to Shirakawa Kaede. Kenji's niece. Former lover of Arai Daiichi and mother of his two sons, Zenko and Taku.
- Kikuta Isamu: a talented Tribe assassin who left the Tribe to live with his wife among the Hidden. Murdered by Kikuta Kotaro before his son Tomasu (Takeo) was born.
- Kikuta Kotaro: master of the Kikuta Tribe family and Isamu's cousin. Teacher of Kenji and other members of the Tribe.
- Kikuta Akio: Kotaro's nephew and Takeo's second cousin. He despises Takeo and antagonizes him whenever he can, especially when Takeo and Yuki become lovers.
- Kondo Kiichi: A member of the tribe who works with Shizuka to protect Kaede.
- Kuroda Shintaro: a notoriously talented member of the Tribe, despite being born into the lesser Kuroda family. He is sent to assassinate Shigeru, but his death at Takeo's hands reveals Takeo's true nature as someone who possesses the blood of the Tribe.

=== Others ===
- Matsuda Shingen: a former warrior who became a priest at Terayama where he trained Shigeru during his youth, later becoming the abbot of Terayama
- Kubo Makoto: a monk at Terayama temple, he claimed to have fallen in love with Takeo and the two slept together on one occasion. He was Takeo's closest friend and advisor.
- Jo-An: an outcaste and member of the Hidden who aids Takeo in his campaigns, to the disgust of the samurai (warrior) class.
- Lord Fujiwara: a Seishuu noble who takes an interest in Shirakawa Kaede and arranges with Arai Daiichi for a marriage to Kaede, even after Kaede has already married Takeo.
- Mamoru: Lord Fujiwara's lover, protege, and companion. He's also an actor and plays women's roles in the plays Fujiwara puts on.

=== Genealogies ===
In the genealogies, the following notation is used:

    : Adopted or illeg.
  ... Unknown cousin relationship
  (s) A son
  (d) A daughter
  (3d) 3 daughters

==== The Tribe ====
      yinka               michael
        |                    |
        |                    +----------------------+---------------------+
    Grandfather              |                      |                     |   
       MUTO                 (s)                    (s)                   (d)
        |                    |                      |                     |
  +-----+------------+       |                      |                     |
  |    +-------------|-------|----------------------+-----+-----+         |
  |    |             |       |                      |     |     |         |
 (s)= (d)   Seiko = Kenji  Isamu = Sara = Shimon  Kotaro (s) Gosaburo   Shintaro
    |             |         (1)  |      |  (2)            |     |
    |             |         +----+      |                 |     |
    |             |         |     +-----+--+              |     +------+----+
    |             |         |     |        |              |     |      |    |
 Shizuka  Akio = Yuki ≈ Tomasu  Maruta  Madaren         Akio  Kunio  Yuzu  Ume
    |      *          | (Takeo)                           :*
    |                 |                                   :
    +------+          +---------------------------------+ : 
    |      |                                            | : 
  Zenko   Taku                                         Hisao 

==== Otori Clan ====
       OTORI Takeyoshi
       m. Imperial Concubine                                       
             |
    ''(many generations)''.....................................          ''(Seishuu)''
             |                                   |        |
 wife 1 =  OTORI = wife 2                      Ichiro     |           SUGITA
        |        |                                        |             |
        |        +-------+-------------+                  |       +-----+------+------+
        |                |             |                  |       |     |      |      |
 Shigemori = Masako    Shoichi        Masahiro          Eijiro = Eriko Sachie Haruki Hikaru
    :      |                           |    :                  |                      |
    :      |                           |    :                  |                      |
    :   +--+--------------+     Yoshitomi  Ryoma               +------+----+          |
    :   |                 |                                    |      |    |          |
 Isamu Shigeru = YANAGI  Takeshi       Lord  = Cousin to     Danjo  (2s+) (3d)     Hiroshi
    |   :        Moe              SHIRAKAWA  | Lady MARUYAMA
    |   :                                    | 
    |   :    +------------+------------------+
    |   :    |            |                  |
    Takeo = Kaede        Ai = SONODA       Hana = ARAI Zenko
          |                 | Mitsuru           | 
   +------+-----+-----+     |          +--------+------+
   |      |     |     |     |          |        |      |
 Shigeko Maya  Miki  (s)  (2d+)     Sunaomi  Chikara  Hiromasa
      

Yanagi Moe is related to both the Otori Lords and to Shigeru's mother.

==== Other Clans ====
(d)-daughter (s)-son (d.)-dead

=== The Tribe ===
The Tribe are a secret organisation that nurture the powers that the world used to have. The Tribe consists of five families that existed before the lords and the clans, a time when magic was common. Since that time the Tribe have retained these abilities through dedication and training. They are frequently employed as spies and assassins by various institutions within the Three Countries. While they usually take on the guise of merchants or travelling actors and acrobats, some members of the Tribe live rather unassuming lives as traders and money lenders rather than as spies and assassins. They are like ninjas.

Little is known about the nature of the Tribe, and the organization is rarely employed with complete trust. Most of the information that exists on the Tribe was secretly compiled by Otori Shigeru with the help of Muto Shizuka.

Unfortunately for the Tribe, the abilities they possess are being lost with new generations, possibly due to inbreeding depression. This theory is likely since some Tribe members with a non-Tribe parent have shown to have great abilities.

==== Kikuta ====
The most ferocious family that is known for its power, harshness, and skilled assassins. They are the pre-eminent tribal family in Tohan territory. Many true Kikuta have a straight palm line across their hand and have great powers, such as invisibility, splitting off a phantom body, acute hearing, and the ability to put someone in a deep sleep merely by staring at them (the 'Kikuta sleep'). It was said that many of the Kikuta gifts were dying out, which was why the Tribe desired Takeo's talents so much. Minor skills, possess by the weaker Kikuta, include agility and the ability to perceive invisibility and the second self.

In some very rare cases, some Kikuta members are ghost masters, and have the ability to communicate with the spirits of the deceased, as well as commanding them.

The Kikuta Master was Kikuta Kotaro, followed by his nephew Kikuta Akio. They are very traditional in their thinking and do not want to let peace succeed throughout the three countries. Takeo's father Kikuta Isamu was the greatest assassin in the Kikuta before he met Takeo's mother and defected to The Hidden. He was killed later by Kikuta Kotaro when he had refused to fight him because of the Hidden's religion and the vow he made to never kill again after he married Takeo's mother.

==== Muto ====
One of the two large clans of the Tribe that still have substantial gifts, and the major family in the Middle Country. They are renowned for their changing faces; as such, they are skilled as spies. They also share some of the more famous skills of the Tribe with the Kikuta, such as invisibility. The Master of the Muto was Muto Kenji, and after his death, Muto Shizuka. The Muto have strong links with the Otori and believe that the Tribe should change in the future. At the beginning of the series there is a close alliance between the Muto and Kikuta which wanes throughout the series. Controversy surrounded Shizuka's appointment as head of the clan, firstly because she was a woman, and secondly because she was appointed by Otori Takeo and not by the family.

==== Kuroda ====
A lesser clan of the Tribe that are mainly merchants, money lenders and informants. They possess some of the gifts of the greater clans, and a characteristic practicality which makes them superb assassins (e.g. Kuroda Shintaro). In The Harsh Cry of the Heron it is mentioned that the Kuroda can perceive invisibility, but cannot become invisible themselves. The only other Kuroda character encountered in the series is Kondo Kiichi (taking the name Kondo from adoption into his mother's side of the family.)

==== Kudo and Imai ====
The two lesser clans of the Tribe. They mostly work as grooms and servants.

=== Trivia ===
- The name "Hidden" for the secretly held religious system of belief probably comes from the title that Christians once held in feudal Japan, "Kakure Kirishitan," literally "Hidden Christians." First Catholics and soon Protestants as well were persecuted by the Tokugawa family after the battle of Sekigahara in 1600. Catholics were treated much more brutally, and were publicly executed. Thus, many devout believers concealed their faiths and became "Hidden."
- The three religions in the novel are very similar to three actual religions: the "Hidden" are similar to Christians (although actual Christians do appear later on in the series), those who worship "the enlightened one" follow similar beliefs to Buddhists, and those who believe in the spirits of nature are Shinto (Japan's native religion).
- Takeo's real name, "Tomasu" is the Japanese pronunciation of the Christian name "Thomas", as the name of Hidden outcast Jo-An could be perceived as a variation of "John". Tomasu's sister, Madaren, is the Japanese version of Madeline, and his other sister, Maruta, could be a version of "Martha". Japanese Christians in the feudal era took Japanized Christian names.
- All of the titles follow the Japanese poetic style (haiku and waka) of 5 and 7 syllables.
- Author Lian Hearn details the origins of the Tribe in her four book series The Tale of Shikanoko, published in 2016. The events in The Tale of Shikanoko occur many generations before the events in the Tales of the Otori.

== Awards and critical reception ==
The first book of the series, Across the Nightingale Floor, was featured in Bloomsbury's Good Reading Guides to the hundred best fantasy novels, with the Otori tales described as a "shimmering blend of quiet delicacy and ruthless action", and as setting "a new standard for young adult fantasy". The Guardian regarded the books as a departure from Hearn's earlier writing as Gillian Rubinstein, and commented positively on their density of allusions and focus on "the intricacies of Japanese society". In a similar remark, the Australian Book Review said that Hearn's books left its readers "reflecting on Japaneseness [and] its enduring characteristics". The violence in the novels was however critiqued by The New York Times, which described the third book Brilliance of the Moon as "blood-soaked" and "a by-the-numbers combat epic".

The fifth book, Heaven's Net Is Wide, won the 2008 Aurealis Award for best fantasy novel. This was the third nomination for the series, with the earlier books Grass for His Pillow and Brilliance of the Moon shortlisted for the award in 2004 and 2005.
