= Grass for His Pillow =

Novel by Gillian Rubinstein

- Author: Lian Hearn
- Language: English
- Series: Tales of the Otori
- Genre: Fantasy novel
- Publisher: Hodder Headline
- Publication date: 2003
- Publication place: Australia
- Media type: Print (Hardback & Paperback)
- Pages: 353 pp
- ISBN: 0-7336-1563-5
- OCLC: 62537718
- Preceded by: Across the Nightingale Floor
- Followed by: Brilliance of the Moon

Grass for His Pillow is the second novel in Lian Hearn's Tales of the Otori trilogy, published in 2003. The events in the novel cover a period of approximately 6 months (from Autumn through to Spring the next year), following directly after those in Across the Nightingale Floor.

== Plot summary ==
Kaede slowly recovers from the Kikuta sleep given to her by Takeo, with dreams of the White Goddess: Be patient. He will come for you. Afterwards she travels towards home, accompanied by Shizuka. Arai is furious that Takeo has gone off with the Tribe, and realizes that he had underestimated them. He sends his men to search for him, and to assassinate Shizuka, his ex-lover whom he now fears because of her association with the Tribe. However, the attempt fails. Kaede is pregnant with Takeo's child, but Shizuka creates the notion of a secret marriage with Shigeru before his death to explain the coming child.

Meanwhile, Takeo is kept hidden inside a Tribe house in Yamagata. Kikuta Akio, one of his abductors, is charged with teaching him, despite their mutual hatred. Under the disguise of traveling acrobats, they head north to Matsue. Yuki, Kenji's daughter, enters a relationship with Takeo as directed to by the Tribe, though she has genuine affection for him. One day she leaves suddenly, pregnant with his child, whom the tribe hope will inherit Takeo's extraordinary abilities.

Kaede returns to her childhood home to find the estate in disrepair, her mother dead, and her father in despair after losing a battle to Arai and not having the courage to take his own life. She determines, despite her gender, to take over Shirakawa. She attracts the interest of an Imperial noble who lives nearby, Lord Fujiwara, who assists her in return for hearing her secrets. Makoto, a monk from Terayama, visits and accidentally reveals that there was no marriage between Kaede and Shigeru. In disgrace, her father decides their whole family must take their lives, and attacks Kaede. Shizuka and Kondo (a retainer, and member of the tribe) rescue her by killing him. Kaede goes into labour, miscarries her child, and becomes gravely ill.

The Tribe become frustrated with Takeo's disobedience, and send him on a mission as a last chance. They believe Shigeru compiled records on the Tribe, so Takeo goes to his old house with Akio to retrieve them—Takeo being the only one who could get across the nightingale floor without being detected. Takeo discovers the records are at Terayama, but decides to escape from the Tribe. He shakes off Akio, and makes his way south, with winter closing in. On the way he is taken to a blind woman who delivers the prophecy that would haunt him: "Your lands will stretch from sea to sea...Five battles will buy you peace, four to win and one to lose. Many must die, but you yourself are safe from death, except at the hands of your own son." After evading several attempts on his life by the Tribe, he reaches Terayama the last day before the pass is closed by snow.

Once Spring thaws the snow, Kaede excuses herself from Fujiwara, stating her intention to visit Arai, her overlord, to discuss her future. He reluctantly agrees, and she travels via Terayama, as she has heard that Takeo is there. They meet, and as Takeo is under a death sentence from the Tribe, Kaede sends Shizuka and Kondo away. Against advice, Takeo and Kaede marry at Terayama.

== Reception ==
Reviews of Grass for His Pillow were mixed. Publishers Weekly's review was positive, writing "With quick, direct sentences like brushstrokes on a Japanese scroll, she suggests vast and mysterious landscapes full of both menace and wonder. Hearn shows that middle novels of trilogies don't have to simply fill space between an exciting opening and conclusion." On the other hand, a reviewer in the School Library Journal wrote "The novel suffers from middle-book syndrome in that just as the action starts to get exciting, readers are told to wait for book three."

Other reviews appeared in Kirkus Reviews, Booklist Reviews, and Voice of Youth Advocates.

It was shortlisted for the 2003 Aurealis Award for best fantasy novel.

== See also ==
- Tales of the Otori
