= Children's Peace Literature Award =

Australian literary award

Children's Peace Literature Award is an Australian literary prize awarded every other year by the South Australian Psychologists for Peace, an interest group of the Australian Psychological Society.

The Children's Peace Literature Award was inaugurated in 1987, when Gillian Rubinstein won for her book Space Demons.

== Award winners ==
Year	Author	Title	Publisher	References
1987	Gillian Rubinstein	Space Demons	Omnibus Books	
1989	Victor Kelleher	The Makers	Puffin	
1991	Libby Gleeson	Dodger	Puffin	
1993	Isobelle Carmody	The Gathering	Puffin	joint winners
1993	Bob Graham	Rose Meets Mr Wintergarten	Penguin Books	joint winners
1995	Brian Caswell	Deucalion	University of Queensland Press	
1997	James Moloney	A Bridge to Wiseman's Cove	University of Queensland Press	
1999	Phillip Gwynne	Deadly Unna	Penguin Books	
2001	James Moloney	Touch Me	University of Queensland Press	
2003	Irini Savvides	Sky Legs	Hodder Headline Australia	
2005	Kirsten Murphy	The King of Whatever	Penguin Books	
2007	Michael Gerard Bauer	Don't Call Me Ishmael	Omnibus	
2009	Christine Harris	Audrey Goes to Town	Little Hare Books	joint winners
2009	Kate Constable	Winter for Grace	Allen & Unwin	joint winners
2011	Sue Walker	Arnie Avery	Walker Books	
2013	Aaron Blabey	The Ghost of Miss Annabel Spoon	Penguin	junior readers
2013	Barry Jonsberg	My Life as an Alphabet	Allen & Unwin	older readers
2015	Nicole Hayes	One True Thing	Random House Australia	
2017	Phil Cummings	Boy	Scholastic Australia	
2019	Sue deGennaro	Missing Marvin	Scholastic Australia	
2021	Fiona Hardy	How to Write the Soundtrack to Your Life	Affirm	
2023	Maraym Master	No Words	Pan Macmillan Australia	
2025	David Metzenthen	The Truth of It	Ford Street	
