= Gillian Rubinstein =

English-Australian children's author and playwright (born 1942)

- Born: Gillian Margaret Hanson; 29 August 1942 (age 84); United Kingdom
- Occupation: writer
- Spouse: Phillip
- Children: Matt (born 1974), Tessa (born 1977) and Susannah (born 1979)
- Writing career
- Pen name: Lian Hearn; G. M. Hanson
- Notable awards: Children's Peace Literature Award, 1987; Deutscher Jugendliteraturpreis, 2004
- Website: www.gillianrubinstein.com

Gillian Rubinstein (born 29 August 1942) is an English-born children's author and playwright. Born in Potten End, Berkhamsted, Hertfordshire, England, Rubinstein split her childhood between England and Nigeria, moving to Australia in 1973. As well as eight plays, numerous short stories and articles, she has written over 30 books. Her award-winning and hugely popular 1986 debut Space Demons introduced the themes of growing up and fantasy worlds which emerge often in her other writings. Books such as At Ardilla, Foxspell and Galax-Arena all received critical acclaim and multiple awards.

In 2001, Rubinstein published Across the Nightingale Floor, the first of the best-selling three-book series Tales of the Otori series under the pseudonym Lian Hearn. The series is set in a fictional island nation resembling feudal Japan.

The name 'Lian' comes from a childhood nickname. 'Hearn' apparently refers to herons which are a prominent theme in the series. It has also been suggested that the surname is most likely borrowed from Lafcadio Hearn. Lafcado was one of the first Western writers to tackle Japanese mythology.

Gillian Rubinstein currently resides in Mullumbimby, New South Wales.

== Works ==
=== Writing as Gillian Rubinstein ===
- Space Demons (1987)
- Beyond the Labyrinth (1988)
- Skymaze (1989)
- At Ardilla (Omnibus Books, 1991)
- Answers to Brut (Omnibus Books, 1991)
- Galax-Arena (Hyland House, 1992) (2nd edition 2001)
- Mr Plunkett's pool (Random House Australia, 1992), illustrated by Terry Denton
- Keep Me Company (Viking, 1992), illustrated by Lorraine Hannay
- Dog in, Cat Out (Ticknor & Fields, 1993), illustrated by Ann James
- Foxspell (Hyland House, 1994)
- Jake and Pete (Random House Australia, 1995), illustrated by Terry Denton
- The Giant's Tooth (Puffin, 1995), illustrated by Craig Smith
- Peanut the ponyrat (Heinemann, 1995)
- Annie's Brother's Suit (Hyland House, 1996)
- Witch Music and other stories (Hyland House, 1996)
- Shinkei (Omnibus Books, 1996)
- Sharon, keep your hair on (Random House Australia, 1996), illustrated by David Mackintosh
- Under the Cat's Eye (Hodder Headline, 1997)
- Jake and Pete and the stray dogs Random House Australia, 1997), illustrated by Terry Denton
- Each beach (Box Press, 1998) illustrations by Mark Sofilas
- Hooray for the Kafe Karaoke (Random House Australia, 1998), pictures by David Mackintosh
- The Pirates' Ship (Puffin Books, 1998), illustrated by Craig Smith
- The Fairy's Wings (Puffin Books, 1998), illustrated by Craig Smith
- Pure Chance (Walker Books, 1998), illustrations by Caroline Binch
- Ducky's nest (Random House Australia, 1999), illustrated by Terry Denton
- The Mermaid of Bondi Beach (Hodder Children's Books, 1999), illustrated by Anna Pignataro
- Jake & Pete and the Catcrowbats (Random House Australia, 1999), illustrated by Terry Denton
- Jake and Pete and the magpie's wedding (Random House Australia, 2000), with Terry Denton
- Terra-Farma (Viking, 2001)
- Prue Theroux : the cool librarian (Random House Australia, 2001), illustrated by David Mackintosh
- The Whale's Child (Hodder Headline Australia, 2002)

=== Writing as Lian Hearn ===
==== Tales of the Otori ====
===== Main sequence =====
1. Across the Nightingale Floor (2002)
2. Grass for His Pillow (2003)
3. Brilliance of the Moon (2004)
4. The Harsh Cry of the Heron (2006)

===== Prequel =====
- Heaven's Net is Wide (2007)

==== Other works ====
- "His Kikuta Hands" (2016) is a short story expanding on a scene in Brilliance of the Moon

==== Children of the Otori ====
1. Orphan Warriors (2020)
2. Sibling Assassins (2020)
- "Wine, Knife, Sword - A Tale from the Eight Islands" (2018, free ebook), short story, background to Orphan Warriors

==== The Tale of Shikanoko ====
1. Emperor of the Eight Islands (April 2016)
2. Autumn Princess, Dragon Child (June 2016)
3. Lord of the Darkwood (August 2016)
4. The Tengu's Game of Go (September 2016)

The Tale of Shikanoko series is set in the Otori universe, several centuries prior to the Tales of the Otori.

==== Stand-alone novels ====
- The Storyteller and His Three Daughters (2013)
- Blossoms and Shadows (2014)

=== Writing as G.M. Hanson ===
- "See Nikko and Die", story in Love Lies Bleeding: A Crimes for Summer Anthology, edited by Jennifer Rowe

=== Anthologies edited by Gillian Rubinstein ===
- After Dark: Seven Tales to Read at Night (Omnibus/Puffin, 1988)
- Before Dawn: More Tales to Read at Night (Omnibus/Puffin, 1988)

=== Contributions ===
- New introduction as Lian Hearn for Japan and Her People, by Anna Hartshorne, Jetlag Press, 2007. Edited by Brent Massey and Christopher E. West.

== Awards ==
- Children's Peace Literature Award 1987
- Deutscher Jugendliteraturpreis 2004
