= Rod Jones (author) =

Australian novelist

Rod Jones (born 5 February 1953) is an Australian novelist. He was writer in residence at La Trobe University for four years, and has also been the Australia Council's writer in residence in Paris. He studied English and History at the University of Melbourne.

== Writing ==
Jones’ first novel, Julia Paradise, won the Fiction Award in the South Australian Premier's Awards in 1988, was shortlisted for the Miles Franklin Literary Award and was runner-up for the Femina Etranger Prize in Paris. It has been translated into ten languages and published throughout the world, most recently as a 2013 Text Classic, with an introduction by Emily Maguire. Julia Paradise was described by The New York Times as "... utterly original ... a remarkable accomplishment".

His second novel, Prince of the Lilies, interweaves Minoan archaeology and life in contemporary Greece.

Billy Sunday, Jones' third novel, was winner of the 1995 Age Book of the Year Award for Fiction and the 1996 National Book Council Banjo Award for Fiction. The Boston Globe called Billy Sunday, 'The Great American Novel'.

His fourth novel, Nightpictures, was shortlisted for the 1998 Miles Franklin Award and published in France under the title Images de la Nuit (Albin Michel).

Jones's fifth novel, Swan Bay (Actes Sud), is published in France under the title La Baie des Cygnes.

Jones' most recent work is the semi-autobiographical novel The Mothers, released by Text Publishing in 2015. Rose Lucas, in her review for the Australian Book Review, wrote " the novel gives us a rich panoply of characters, places, and issues ... working with imagery and nuance to give us insight into these disparate lives."

== Works ==
- Julia Paradise (1986)
- Prince of the Lilies (1991)
- Billy Sunday (1995)
- Nightpictures (1997)
- Swan Bay: A novel of destiny, desire and death (2003)
- The Mothers (2015)
