= Mitochondrial Eve (novelette) =

- Short story by Greg Egan
- Country: Australia
- Language: English
- Genre: Science fiction

Publication
- Published in: Interzone
- Publication type: Periodical
- Publisher: TTA Press
- Media type: Print
- Publication date: February 1995

"Mitochondrial Eve" is a science-fiction novelette by Australian writer Greg Egan, first published in Interzone #92 in February 1995. The novelette was included in the anthology The Best of Interzone in 1997 and in the collection Luminous in 1998.

== Plot ==
Paul and Lena visit an exhibition in which they see current research to trace back the ancestors of modern humans who are all related to each other. A group called Children of Eve plans to trace back a common female ancestor of all Europeans, called Eve, since male lineages are lost more quickly due to polygamy. Paul and Lena discuss the involvement of quantum effects in the duplication of DNA and intend to do further research to apply it to genetic tracing. Many years later, an opposing group claims to have found a common male ancestor of all Europeans called Adam. Paul and Lena meet in London to witness this launching multiple claims about other common ancestors as well as violent eruptions fueled by racist defenses of them. Paul gets beaten up for his research for the Children of Eve, but later, even against witnesses trying to shout him down, still presents the new research revealing that there in fact is no single common ancestor. Paul finishes by screaming at the crowd to do what is right because it is right, and not because what their lineage is.

== Translation ==
The novelette was translated into Japanese by Makoto Yamagishi (1997), Italian (2001), French by Francis Lustman and Quarante-Deux (2007) and Spanish by Carlos Pavón (2010).

== Reception ==
=== Reviews ===
Karen Burnham writes in Greg Egan (Masters of Science Fiction) about the novelette as an example that "many Egan characters are professional scientists as understood today". She adds that it "directly addresses the conflict between science and religion" since it "takes a stand against religious appropriation of scientific results."

=== Awards ===
The novelette won the Japanese Seiun Award in 1998.

== Literature ==
- Burnham, Karen (2014). Greg Egan (Modern Masters of Science Fiction). Modern Masters of Science Fiction. University of Illinois Press (published 2014-04-03). ISBN 978-0252038419.
