= Fossils (play) =

1995 play written by Manuel Aston

- Author: Manny Aston
- Language: English
- Genre: Play
- Publisher: Currency Press
- Publication date: 1995
- Publication place: Australia
- Media type: Print (Paperback)
- ISBN: 978-0-86819-399-1

Fossils is a play written by the Australian playwright Manny Aston. First performed by Theatre South in 1993, it offers a comic view of parents through the eyes of their teenage offspring. The play was published by Currency Press in 1995. It has become a popular choice for drama teachers and students as the play is easily related to by young teenage audiences. The play was included as part of the Drama Syllabus for the Higher School Certificate from 1997 to 2001, and continues to be used in the general High School Drama Curriculum in many states, including Western Australia, New South Wales, Queensland and Victoria.

== Synopsis ==
Fossils opens with Julie describing her parents as "Homo parentithicus. Found in most urban parts of Australia. Usually roam in pairs, over-protective and trained in advanced methods of torture." Franky is the new boy at school, and there is some mystery surrounding his father and why he left his old school. Julie and Michelle befriend him on the first day. The action centres on the preparations for and aftermath of a school dance, with all its attendant teenage angst. It's a fast paced play, with much quick snappy dialogue and described by critics as an "incredibly funny script."

While the play has a large number of characters, it was originally designed to be performed by only three actors. Most professional productions have cast one male and two female actors; however school productions usually have up to 15 actors.

== Productions ==
=== First production ===
Fossils was first performed by Theatre South on 23 October 1993 at the Bridge Theatre, Wollongong, with the following cast:

- Caroline Johansson as Julie
- Angela Karagianis as Michelle
- Michael Coe as Franky
- Directed by Des Davis
- Designed by Michael Coe
- Lighting design by Roger Hind

=== Subsequent productions ===
Fossils had two public seasons with Theatre South in 1993, and successfully toured the New England region in 1994. The play also had five theatre-in-education seasons from 1993 to 2000 (1993, 1994, 1997, 1998 and 2000) performing at the Bridge Theatre, Wollongong. In 1998, the company performed the play at the Sydney Opera House as part of the school holiday Bennelong Program. The season was sold out and received excellent reviews. The play has been performed in Japan (Yokohama Theatre Group), Berlin (Platypus Theatre), and throughout most of Australia.

== Characters ==
- Julie Jones
- Michelle Watson
- Chicken boy
- Franky Zeferelli
- Julie’s Mum, Jenny
- Julie’s Dad, Peter
- Michelle’s Mum, Claire
- Michelle’s Dad, Steve
- Frankie’s Mum, Maria
- Johnny Johnson
- Dominic
- Miss Rosa

== Bibliography ==
- Stephens, John (Ed.) Always Facing the Issues—Preoccupations in Australian Children's Literature. (2003). The Lion and the Unicorn, (27) 2, pp. v–xvii
- Harding, Jason; Parker, Kathy; Austin, Barry and O'Brien, T. Drama and media [Book Review] [online]. English in Australia, No. 115, Mar 1996: 66–67. Availability: <http://search.informit.com.au/documentSummary;dn=549987856853886;res=IELAPA> ISSN 0155-2147
