= A Kidnapping =

1995 short story by Greg Egan

- Short story by Greg Egan
- Country: Australia
- Language: English
- Genre: Science fiction

Publication
- Published in: Axiomatic
- Publisher: Orion Publishing Group
- Publication date: 1995

"A Kidnapping" is a science-fiction short story by Australian writer Greg Egan, first published in the collection Axiomatic in 1995.

== Plot ==
A man is contacted by hackers, who hold a digital copy of his wife's brain hostage. Meanwhile, her physical self is completely safe. Without any knowledge about how real the copy really is and whether it even thinks to truly be his wife, the man still reflects about giving in. His wife disagrees, tearing apart a self-portrait to prove it doesn't hurt her at all. Although the technology is available and can grant digital immortality, she never considered scanning her brain. The hostage was in fact reconstructed purely from memories of her husband. The husband, who did already have his brain scanned, but doesn't want to spend eternity without his wife, finally pays the hackers a ransom if they agree to halt the simulation and hand it over to him after his death.

== Translations ==
The short story was translated into Hungarian by Erno Nemes (1998), Czech by Petr Kotrle, Romanian by Mihai-Dan Pavelescu, Japanese (1999), Russian (1999), Italian (2003), Spanish (2006), French by Francis Lustman & Quarante-Deux (2006), Danish by Niels Dalgaard, Chinese and Korean.

== Reviews ==
Karen Burnham wrote in Greg Egan (Masters of Modern Science Fiction), that "as in 'Closer', we can never truly know what it is like to be someone else, we must always rely on the models of other people who live in our heads. We don't truly “know” them, but on some level we know our models of them. And we are used to dealing with people at a distance: through letters, e-mails, or phone calls. So it would be easy to feel as strongly about a friend's Copy as you do about the real person."

== Literature ==
- Burnham, Karen (2014). Greg Egan (Modern Masters of Science Fiction). Modern Masters of Science Fiction. University of Illinois Press (published 2014-04-03). ISBN 978-0252038419.
