= John Dale (writer) =

Australian writer

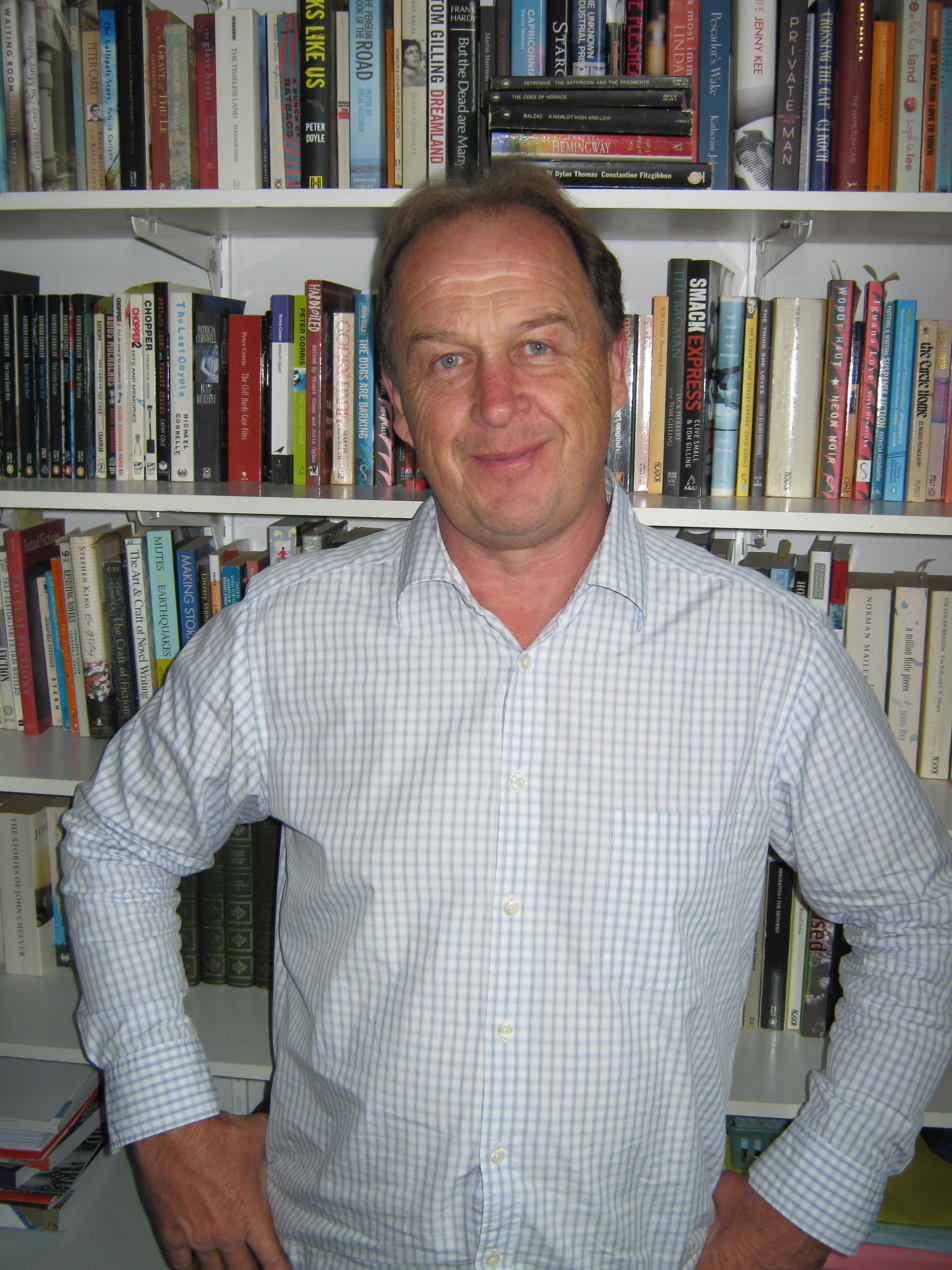
- John Dale in 2014
- Born: Anthony John Dale; 15 January 1963 (age 63); Sydney, New South Wales, Australia
- Writing career
- Language: English
- Years active: 1987 -
- Genre: Crime fiction
- Notable work: Dark Angel
- Notable awards: Ned Kelly Award

John Dale (born 15 January 1953 in Sydney, New South Wales) is an Australian author of crime fiction and true crime books. He completed a Doctorate of Creative Arts at the University of Technology Sydney, in 1999, and subsequently joined the UTS writing Program where he was Professor of Writing and Director of the UTS Centre for New Writing until 2020.

He is the author of ten books including the best-selling Huckstepp and two crime novels Dark Angel and The Dogs Are Barking, published with Serpents Tail Press in the UK, and a memoir, Wild Life, an investigation into the fatal shooting of his grandfather in 1940s Tasmania. He has edited two anthologies, Out West and Car Lovers, and co-edited a third anthology, Best on Ground, on Australian Rules football. His novel, Leaving Suzie Pye, was published in 2010 and translated into Turkish. His novella Plenty was published in 2013. He has been a judge of several major Australian literary awards and his essays, reviews and non-fiction have appeared in a wide variety of journals and newspapers. His research and teaching areas include narrative fiction, creative non-fiction, crime narratives and the novella. His crime novel Detective Work (2015) was based on an unsolved Sydney murder and he was the editor of 'Sydney Noir' (2018). His dystopian novel The Blasphemy Laws was published in 2019 and his latest book is the academic satire The Faculty (2022).

== Awards ==
- Ned Kelly Awards for Crime Writing, Best True Crime, 2005: shortlisted for Wild Life
- Ned Kelly Awards for Crime Writing, Best True Crime, 2000: winner for Huckstepp: A Dangerous Life
- Ned Kelly Awards for Crime Writing, Best First Novel Award, 1996: winner for Dark Angel
- The Angus & Robertson Writer's Fellowship, 1986: winner for The Blank Page

== Bibliography ==
=== Novels ===
- Dark Angel (1995)
- The Dogs are Barking (1998)
- Leaving Suzie Pye (2010)
- Detective Work (2015)
- The Blasphemy Laws (2019)
- The Faculty (2022)

=== Novellas ===
- Plenty (2013)

=== Children's ===
- Army of the Pure (2007)

=== Non-fiction ===
- Huckstepp: A Dangerous Life (2000; revised ed. 2014)
- Wild Life (2004)
- If George Orwell were alive today … on Nineteen Eighty-four and the thrust of Orwellian political satire (2019)

=== Edited ===
- Out West: Australian Dirt (1996)
- Car Lovers: Twelve Australian Writers on Four Wheels (2008)
- Best on Ground Co-edited with Peter Corris (2010)
- Sydney Noir (2018)
