= Galax-Arena =

1995 novel by Gillian Rubinstein

- Author: Gillian Rubinstein
- Language: English
- Genre: Science fiction novel
- Publication date: 1992, 2001 (2nd edition)
- Publication place: Australia
- Media type: Print
- Followed by: Terra-Farma

Galax-Arena, by Gillian Rubinstein, is a 1992 science fiction novel following 3 children who are kidnapped by aliens. It deals with issues of slavery, what we know versus what we believe to be true, the difference between children and adults, street people (children), and spirituality, to an extent.

A sequel, Terra-Farma, was also published. It continues the story of Joella and her siblings after they leave Galax-Arena, and follows their further brushes with Project Genesis Five, the organization who created the Galax-Arena. There was going to be a third novel called Universercus that would conclude the trilogy, but it was never published.

== Synopsis ==
After their mother leaves and their father loses his mind, Joella, Peter, and Liane are traveling to their Aunt Jill when a stranger named Hythe entices, drugs, and kidnaps the trio. He takes them to a remote place and launches them into space, where they are forced to become performers for aliens known as Vexa in Galax-Arena, on the planet Vexak. The Galax-Arena itself is a stadium-type place where human children perform death-defying stunts of gymnastics for a crowd. There are no safety nets, in fact death is sometimes encouraged by their trainer Hythe. As they perform, the Vexa are connected to devices that allow them to feel the adrenaline and danger that the children experience. The children are forced to grow up very quickly in order to survive, but most of them already have, as they were street kids before they were kidnapped.

Joella emphasizes the similarities that her, Peter, Liane and all the rest of the children caught on Vexak, share with animals in captivity on Earth. Hythe is their care-taker so the children may hate him for keeping them there, but show something akin to love for him because he feeds and cares for them. At first the three children want to die but slowly they regain the urge to live and they gradually bond with other child performers, collectively calling themselves the Peb as they no longer identify themselves as "kids" or "children" or "friends" any longer. Hythe also encourages antagonism between the children, particularly in the clash that forms between Peter and another boy, Allyman.

Those who can't perform, like Joella, and later Mariam, are taken to be pets. It is here Joella discovers that the Peb are not performing for aliens, but for humans in costumes. It is part of an elaborate set up to make the children believe there is no way out, and because they believe it, it becomes true. They are actually still on Earth, but refuse to believe it when faced with the evidence. As a pet, Joella manages to expose the Vexa who she has become the pet of, as an elderly woman, Emmeline. Emmeline reveals to Joella and Mariam that Galax-Arena is part of a massive experiment called ‘Genesis 5’ to give the extremely rich clientele of Genesis 5 like Emmeline immortality by channeling the Peb’s adrenalin into the old people’s bodies to trick the body into thinking it is young and not close to death. Problematic children are killed.

Seven of the Peb manage to escape Galax-Arena, though only because they believe that there is hope.
