= Manny Aston =

Australian playwright and academic

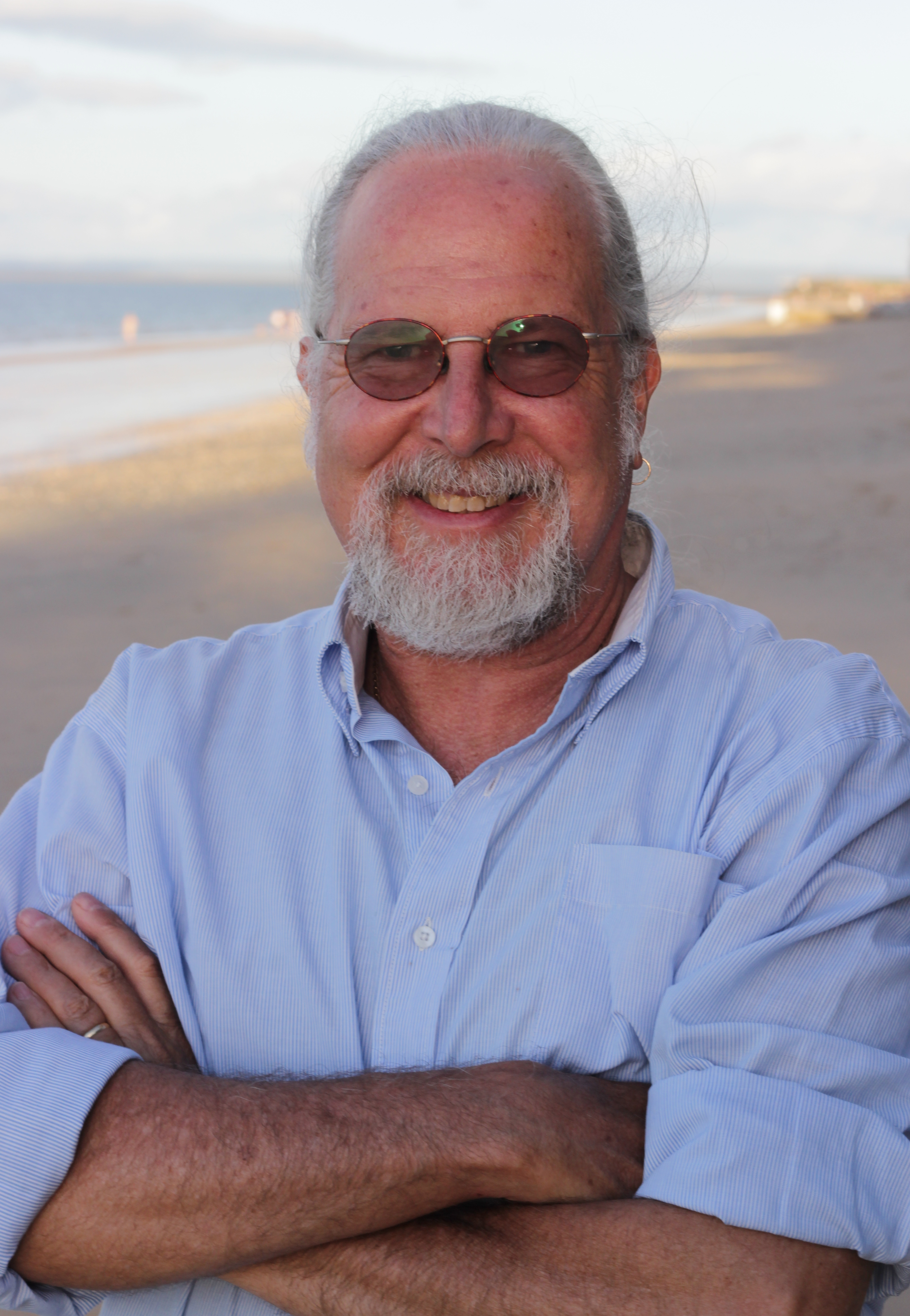
- Aston in Hervey Bay, 2016
- Born: Manuel Steven Aston; 22 March 1961 (age 65); Hamburg
- Occupations: Writer and lecturer

Manuel 'Manny' Aston (born 1961) is an Australian playwright and academic best known for his 1993 play, Fossils.

== Early career ==
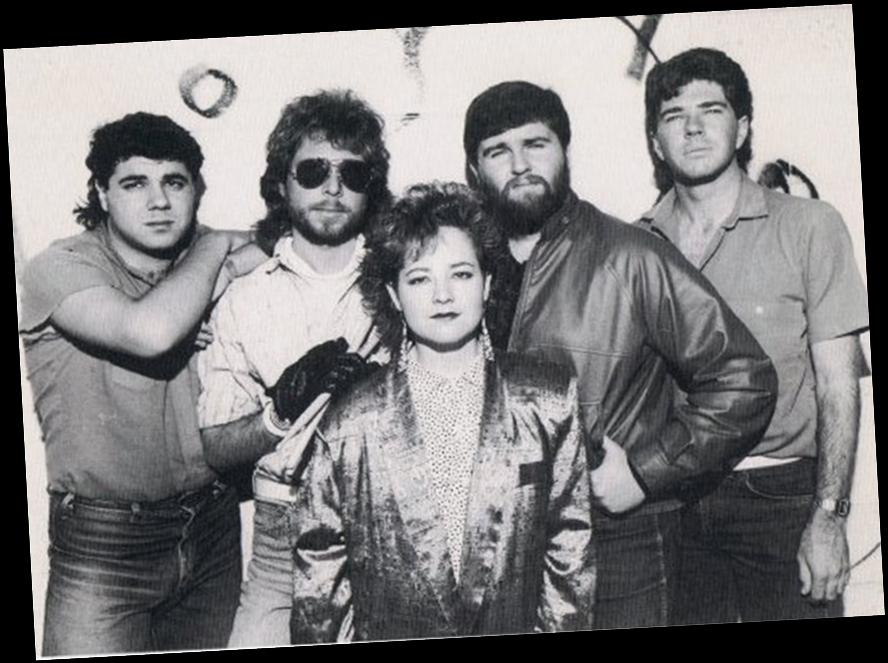
Spyglass Guest 1986, Manny Aston second from left

A graduate of Macquarie University, Aston spent his early career with ATN Channel 7, on the production team for iconic Australian shows such as A Country Practice, Sons and Daughters, and Romper Room. This was followed by an eclectic range of activities including production work with government film unit, Health Media Productions, freelance camerawork, and two years as drummer for 80's pub-rock band, Spyglass Guest.

Aston wrote his first full-length play, Déjà Vu in 1986, followed by a series of successful one-act plays: Three Blind Mice (performed at Sydney's Bay Street Theatre in 1988); Lady Lazarus (a short play based on the poetry of Sylvia Plath), and Take Five (performed in 1989 at the Festival of Human Values in Malaysia). His one-act plays have been extensively performed, with many winning awards in Australian and international drama festivals. In 1988 and 1989 respectively, Aston wrote two Theatre in Education plays, Learn Not To Burn (skin cancer awareness) and How On Earth, a play focusing on environmental issues. He also wrote a short film commissioned by Sydney Water (Brads Rad Adventure).

== Playwriting ==
After Aston received some notice as a playwright for Clay Soldiers in 1991, his second major work, When the Bough Breaks, performed in Sydney and Melbourne, established his reputation as a well known writer within Sydney's fringe theatre scene. Other writing credits followed, including numerous corporate videos, radio and television commercials, and episodes of the Australian sitcom, Hey Dad. Aston's play, The Method, was one of the inaugural plays which opened the newly refurbished Independent Theatre; and he was later commissioned to write plays for Canberra's Jigsaw Theatre on the role of media (Mercury, 1996), and on Federation, (Post & Rail, 2001).

A graduate of the NIDA Playwrights Studio, Aston was writer-in residence and founding member of the prominent Sydney fringe theatre company, Big Hand Theatre Co in the early 1990s; and was also playwright-in-residence for Theatre South (Wollongong) and Self Raising Theatre (Bathurst).

== Fossils ==
Aston is best known for his award-winning teenage play, Fossils – published by Currency Press in 1995, and still in print today. The play has had international seasons in Berlin and Yokohama, and has been toured and performed at the Sydney Opera House, many major regional centres and hundreds of schools throughout the country. Fossils was on the HSC Drama syllabus for many years, and is still a popular workshop choice for performance and drama classes.

== Education ==
Having completed his Bachelor of Arts (majoring in Mass Communication and Philosophy) at Macquarie University, Aston gained his Master of Creative Arts, and Doctor of Creative Arts at the University of Wollongong. In 2002 he gained his Graduate Diploma of Education from Charles Sturt University, and qualified for a Bachelor of Science (Psychology) degree in 2007. He completed his postgraduate studies in Advanced Psychology at the University of New England.

Aston began teaching in 1990 and subsequently taught in secondary schools, universities, TAFE and private colleges. He was a long time contributor to magazines such as Australian Video Camera and the prestigious, Australian Cinematographer. Manny has written academic articles on fields as diverse as psychology, cybercrime, and education. He is a keen advocate of positive education, and is the author of Study Right, which has become one of Australia's best selling ‘How to Study’ guides. Aston is currently an Adjunct Professor at The Fashion Institute (TFI), Sydney.

== Published works ==
- Clay Soldiers (Big Hand Theatre 1991)
- When the Bough Breaks (Big Hand Theatre 1992)
- Fossils (Currency Press 1995)
- Study Smart: A Guide to Successful Study at TAFE (Reedy Books 2005)
- Study Right: A simple guide to effective study (Reedy Books 2006)
