= Judith Fox (author) =

Australian novelist

- Born: 1959 (age 66–67); Newcastle, New South Wales, Australia
- Education: University of Technology, Sydney
- Writing career
- Language: English
- Notable work: Bracelet Honeymyrtle

Judith Fox (born 1959, in Newcastle, New South Wales) is an Australian novelist. She grew up in Newcastle, attended the University of Technology, Sydney, and now works as the CEO of the Australian Shareholders' Association.

== Awards and nominations ==
- 1994 - Bracelet Honeymyrtle was shortlisted for The Australian/Vogel Literary Award
- 1996 - Bracelet Honeymyrtle was shortlisted for the Miles Franklin Award

== Bibliography ==
=== Novels ===
- Bracelet Honeymyrtle (1995)
- Scraping Through Stone (2002)
