= Dark Angel (Dale novel) =

1995 novel by John Dale

- Author: John Dale
- Language: English
- Genre: Novel
- Publisher: Serpent's Tail, London
- Publication date: 1995
- Publication place: Australia
- Media type: Print Paperback
- Pages: 247 pp
- Awards: 1996 Ned Kelly Award Best First Novel, winner
- ISBN: 1-85242-391-9
- OCLC: 35397657
- Dewey Decimal: 823 20
- LC Class: PR9619.3.D235 D37 1995

Dark Angel is a 1995 Ned Kelly Award–winning novel by the Australian author John Dale.

== Awards ==
- Ned Kelly Awards for Crime Writing, Best First Novel Award, 1996: winner

== Reviews ==
- Australian Crime Fiction database
