= Leaving the Lyrebird Forest =

2018 children's novel by Gary Crew

- Author: Gary Crew
- Language: English
- Publisher: Lothian Children's Books
- Publication date: 2018

Leaving the Lyrebird Forest is a 2018 children's novel by Gary Crew, an Australian author and professor of creative writing at the University of the Sunshine Coast. The book is illustrated using wood-block illustrations by Australian artist Julian Laffan.

Leaving the Lyrebird Forest was published by Lothian Children's Books. It was a Children's Book Council of Australia (CBCA) "notable book", and was included on NSW Premier's Reading Challenge list 2022.

== Plot summary ==
This is a story for primary school readers, age 9–12.

Alice Dorritt is a young girl who grew up as an only child, living with her artistic parents in a bushland environment, beyond the outer reaches of a small town in Victoria in the 1930s. She makes friends with a lyrebird, who she names 'Birdy'. He visits her home every second morning.

Strange noises can be heard coming from their neighbours the Browns' home, on a turnoff to the deeper forest, not far from Alice's home. One day she is tempted to go down that track to discover what is happening.

Over the coming months she makes friends with Mr Brown, whose wife recently died. Together they discover what could possibly be rare feather fossils and enlist the help of museum and university-based science experts and a photographer. They also discover Birdy's special secret.

But Alice is getting older, and will have to go away to boarding school. The town is expanding, which threatens the forest and its inhabitants, including Birdy.

One day, inspired by a woman scientist and a woman photographer, Alice realises that it is her dream to finish school and attend university. Although she is sad, she must leave her home and bid farewell to her family, Birdy and Mr Brown.

== Themes ==
- Australian bushland and forest environments
- Australian native birds and animals: lyrebirds
- Growing up, in childhood
- Education of girls and women
- Archaeology, and feather fossils, including those found east of Melbourne, Victoria

== Reviews ==
"...Gary Crew, paints a fairy tale setting of life in the forest, and the woodcut illustrations by Laffan add a touch of magic and suit the style of the times. The story touches on many subjects and highlights the arts and crafts as well as the joy of nature, loss, and friendships." (Yvonne Mes).
