= Paul Thomas (university administrator) =

Australian Vice-Chancellor administrator (1941-)

Paul Thomas AM LRPS
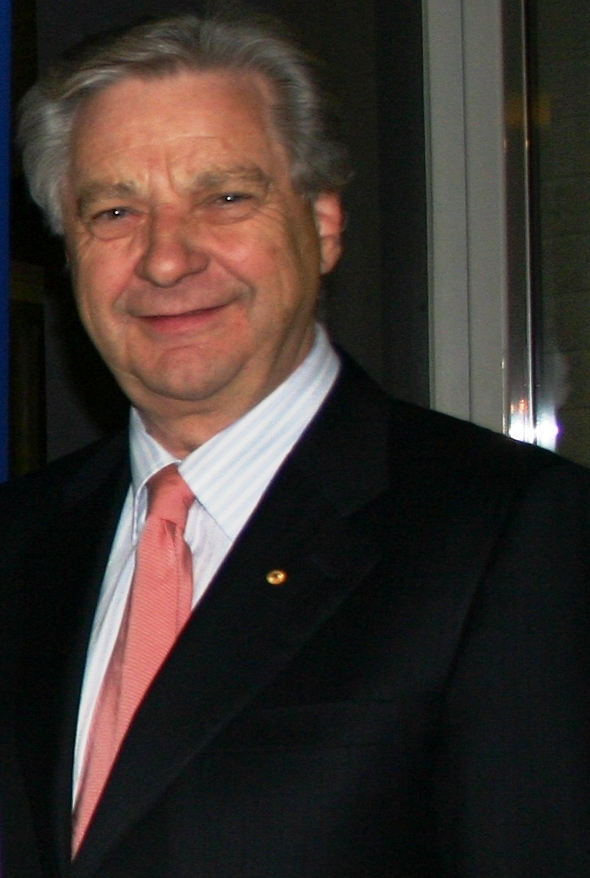

Founding Vice-Chancellor and President University of the Sunshine Coast
- In office 1996–2010
- Succeeded by: Professor Greg Hill

Personal details
- Born: 1941 (age 84–85)
- Education: University of Wales Loughborough University University of Queensland

Inaugural chairman

Chair of the Sunshine Coast Hospital and Health Board
- In office 2012–present

Paul Thomas AM (born 1941) is the founding Vice-Chancellor and President of the University of the Sunshine Coast.

From March 1994 to December 1995, Thomas was the Planning President of the university, then named the Sunshine Coast University College. In 1996, he became the inaugural Vice-Chancellor of the University of the Sunshine Coast. He retired from office in 2010.

In May 2012, the Minister for Health of Queensland Lawrence Springborg announced that Thomas had been appointed Chair of the Sunshine Coast Hospital and Health Board. This new role involves the new Sunshine Coast University Hospital in which the Queensland Government is investing $2.03 billion.

== Education ==
Thomas received undergraduate degrees from the University of Wales, Aberystwyth and a research MA (Master of Arts) from Loughborough University before coming to Australia in 1976. At the University of Queensland, Brisbane, he received a PhD.

== Career ==
Thomas occupied senior posts in the British higher education system before taking up a position as Head of Education at Kelvin Grove Campus of Brisbane College of Advanced Education (later Queensland University of Technology).

From March 1994 to December 1995, Thomas was the Planning President for Australia's newest public university, University of the Sunshine Coast. In the early planning stages, Thomas operated out of the boot of his car when he consulted with Sunshine Coast community groups and businesses. Thomas has been interviewed and presented on planning and designing university campuses.

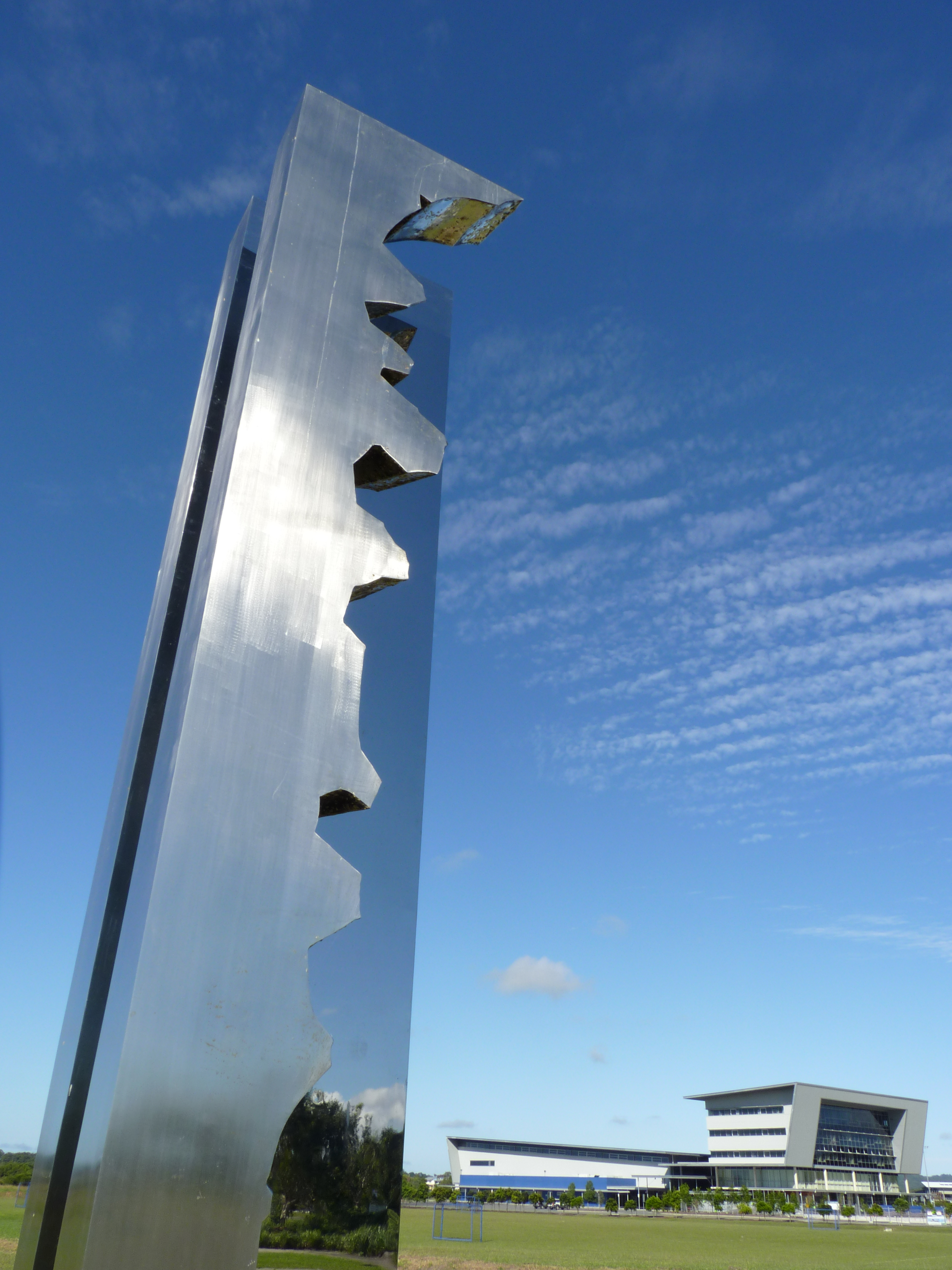
Thomas commissioned the USC donor funded Leonard SABOL, "Between" sculpture commemorating the USC Health and Sport Centre Complex in background.

In 1996, Thomas became the inaugural Vice-Chancellor of the University of the Sunshine Coast. The university then only had 524 students, two buildings and a choice of two degrees. Under his tenure and 15 years later, the university today has more than 7,000 students, 16 buildings and more than 100 undergraduate and postgraduate study programs.

During Thomas's term as Vice-Chancellor, the University of the Sunshine Coast developed an art collection of contemporary Australian art with an emphasis on Queensland artists including indigenous artists.

Thomas also initiated a $2.1 million Olympic-size swimming pool which opened in late 2011. This is used for training by elite athletes as well as for community use.

Thomas was also the chairman of the board of directors at the Innovation Centre Sunshine Coast through all stages of its development.

In March 2010, the University of the Sunshine Coast received its sixth consecutive Employer of Choice For Women citation. These citations are awarded annually by the Equal Opportunity for Women in the Workplace Agency in recognition of efforts to increase the representation of women at senior staff levels and to help staff maintain work-life balance.

Thomas is currently a member of the National Leadership Institute Advisory Board, made up of Australian experts from academia, government and industry.

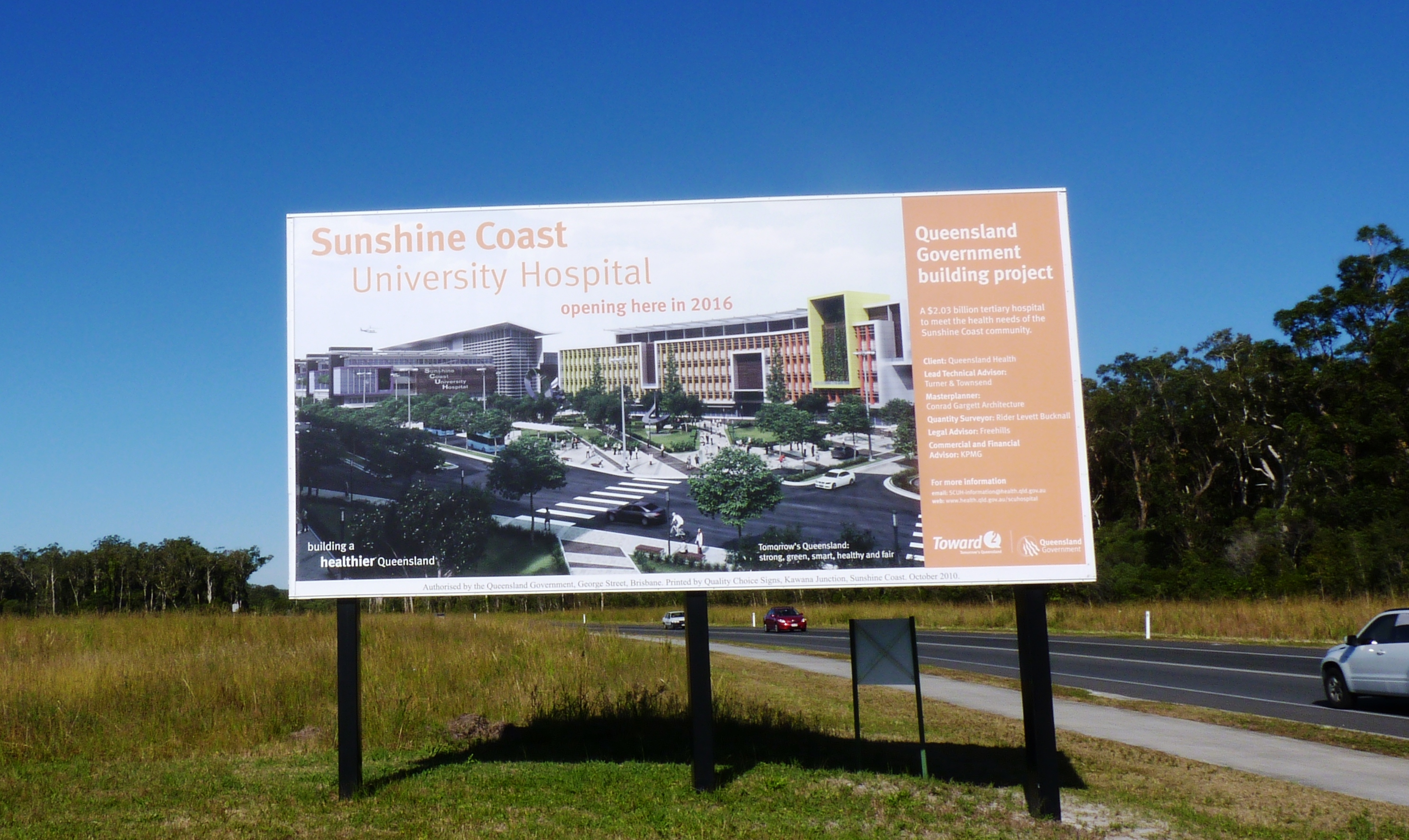
Site of the new Sunshine Coast University Hospital at Kawana Waters

=== Post-university career ===
On 18 May 2012, Thomas was appointed Inaugural Chair of the Sunshine Coast Hospital and Health Board by the Minister for Health of Queensland, Lawrence Springborg. He was involved in the new $2.03 billion Sunshine Coast University Hospital (SCUH) which opened in 2017.

== Honours ==
In 2002, Thomas was awarded a Centenary Medal for services to Australian society through higher education and university administration.

On Australia Day 2007, Thomas was appointed a Member of the Order of Australia for service to higher education, particularly through the development and administration of the University of the Sunshine Coast, and to the establishment of educational links with China and Japan.

In 2009, Thomas was the recipient of the Asia-Pacific Chief Executive Leadership Award by the Council for the Advancement and Support of Education (CASE). He is the first Vice-Chancellor of any Australian university to be recognised in this way by CASE, which annually presents leadership awards in eight districts throughout the United States and Canada, as well as in Europe and the Asia-Pacific. CASE President John Lippincott hosted the presentation ceremony in Kuala Lumpur on 25 March 2009. Lippincott praised Thomas for his pioneering leadership and for developing a culture of philanthropy through exemplary regional engagement.

In 2011, Thomas became the first Emeritus Professor at the University of the Sunshine Coast.

No academic institution I've ever been associated with has meant more to me than USC does. To be formally linked with the University in this way is a great honour, and even more so because it's the first Emeritus Professorship from USC to be awarded. – Professor Paul Thomas AM

In addition, Thomas is:

- a Fellow of the Australian College of Educators
- a recipient of two Rotary International Paul Harris Fellowship Awards.
- a Fellow of the Royal Photographic Society (LRPS: Licentiateship of the Royal Photographic Society) which is awarded by the Society's Council.

== Photography ==
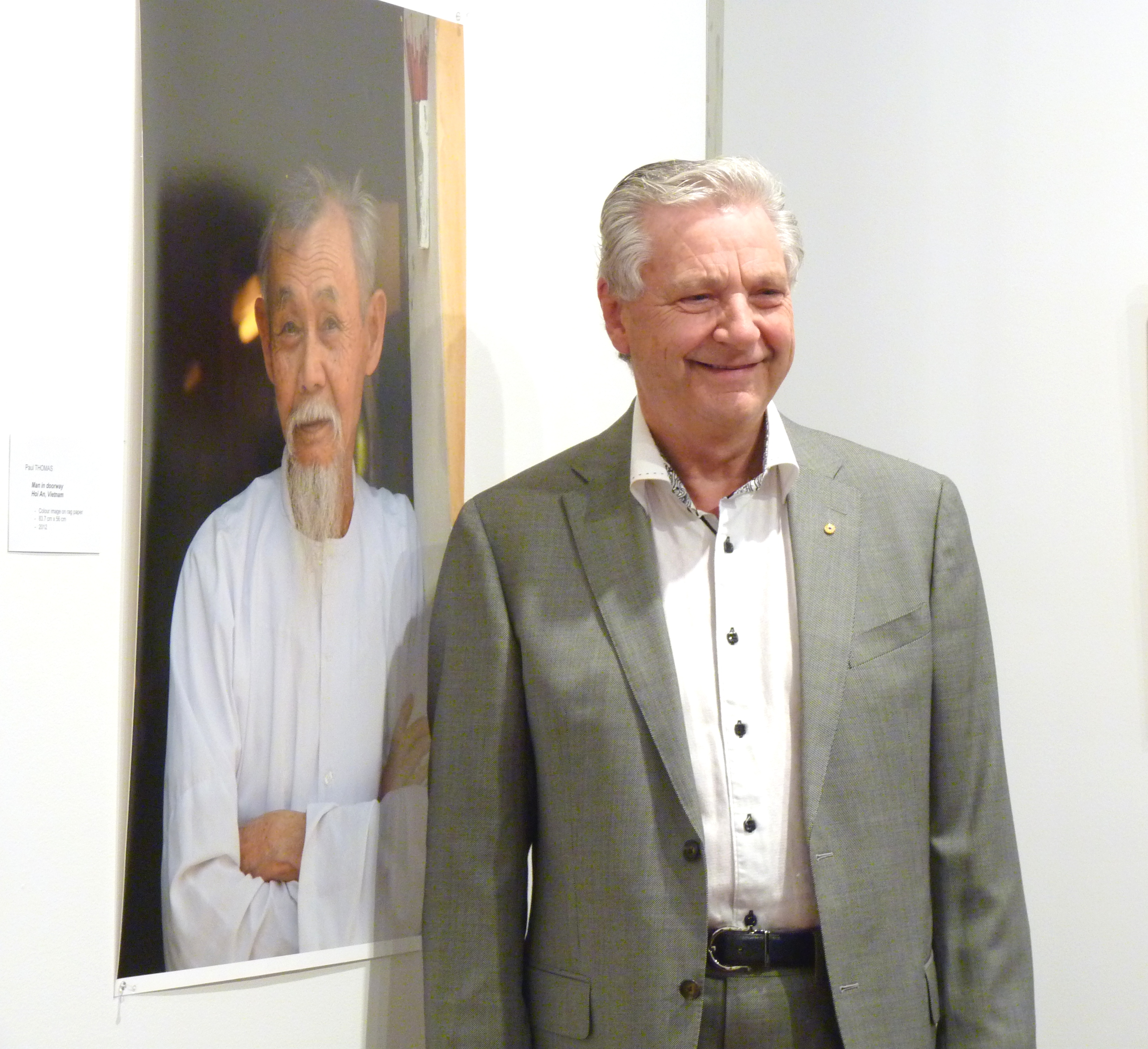
Thomas at the opening of his photographic exhibition "Images of Vietnam"

In 2013 a photographic exhibition titled Paul Thomas AM: Images of Vietnam was opened displaying 56 photographs of markets, fishing boats, scenery and street life Thomas captured during his 2012 trip to Vietnam.
