= Peter Gouldthorpe =

Australian artist and author (born 1954)

- Born: Peter James Gouldthorpe; 30 July 1954 (age 71); Melbourne, Victoria, Australia
- Known for: Children's books, illustration, landscape painting, trompe l'Oeil
- Website: {https://petergouldthorpe.com}

Peter James Gouldthorpe (born 30 July 1954) is an Australian artist and author best known for his children's books. He lives and works in Hobart, Tasmania with his wife, Jennie, and has two children.

== Early life ==
Gouldthorpe was born in Melbourne, but most of his childhood was spent in the Northern Beaches of Sydney. After leaving high school, he studied art at East Sydney Technical College (now the National Art School), before moving to Tasmania at the age of nineteen. Here, he taught at Devonport and Launceston TAFE colleges, and began painting landscapes, holding several solo exhibitions in Devonport at The Little Gallery (now the Devonport Regional Gallery).

== Children's books ==
First Light (1993)

Gouldthorpe wrote and illustrated his first children's book, Jonah and the Manly Ferry, in 1983. Since then, he has gone on to illustrate or write/illustrate seventeen picture books and innumerable educational books. His work uses a wide variety of mediums including linocut, scraperboard, watercolour, crayon, coloured pencils, acrylic and oil paints. His books have often been shortlisted for The Children's Book Council of Australia's Children's Book of the Year Awards. In 1994, First Light (written by Gary Crew) was awarded Picture Book of the Year. He has collaborated with some of Australia's best-loved children's authors, including Paul Jennings, John Marsden and Colin Thiele. He has also introduced a new generation of young readers to the works of great Australian poets CJ Dennis and Ethel Turnerthrough his illustrated versions of their work.

Tasman Passage (oil on linen, 2014)

Since 2001, Gouldthorpe has returned to landscape painting, often working en plein air. He has held several solo shows at Colville Street Art Gallery. He has been a seven-time finalist in the Glover Prize, winning the People's Choice Award in 2010 and 2021.Peter exhibits his work through Handmark Gallery.

== Other media ==
Gouldthorpe's work appears in many other areas, including murals, stamps, advertising, film, television and live performance. Several of his murals, employing the Trompe-l'œil technique, can be seen around the streets and businesses of his home town, Hobart.

== Works ==
=== Children's non-fiction ===
"The White Mouse" (written and illustrated by Peter Gouldthorpe, 2015) - Children"s Book Councillor Australia - short-listed for Eve Pownall Award, 2015.

Ice, Wind, Rock: Douglas Mawson in the Antarctic (written and illustrated by Peter Gouldthorpe, 2013) - Children's Book Council of Australia Eve Pownall Book of the Year Award Notable Book 2014

Lyrebird!: a true story (written by Jackie Kerrin, 2012) - Children's Book Council of Australia Eve Pownall Book of the Year Award Honour Book 2013

No Return: Captain Scott’s Race to the Pole (written and illustrated by Peter Gouldthorpe, 2011)

Queenie: One Elephants Story (written by Corinne Fenton, 2006) - Children's Book Council of Australia Eve Pownall Book of the Year Award Honour Book 2007

=== Children's fiction ===
"Our Dog Knows Words" written by Peter and Illustrated by Lucy Gouldthorpe, 2015. The Dog on the Tuckerbox (written by Corinne Fenton, 2008)

Pannikin and Pinta (written by Colin Thiele, 1999)

Norton’s Hut (written by John Marsden, 1998)

The Lost Diamonds of Killiecrankie (co-created with Gary Crew, 1995)

The Wonder Thing (written by Libby Hathorn, 1993)

First Light (written by Gary Crew, 1993) - Children's Book Council of Australia Picture Book of the Year 1994

Grandad's Gifts (written by Paul Jennings, 1992) - Children's Book Council of Australia Book of the Year Award Shortlisted Book 1993

Hist! (poem by C. J. Dennis, 1991) Children's Book Council of Australia Book of the Year Award Honour Book 1992

Sheepdogs (written by Jack Bedson, 1990)

Don’t Get Burnt! (written by Jack Bedson, 1985)

Walking to School (poem by Ethel Turner, 1984)

Jonah and the Manly Ferry (written and illustrated by Peter Gouldthorpe, 1983)

=== Trompe l'Oeil ===
The Aurora Mural, Denison Lane, South Hobart, Tasmania, 2002

Tony Haigh Walk, North Hobart, Tasmania, 2000

Le Provençal Restaurant, South Hobart, Tasmania 1994

=== Stamps ===
Creatures of the Night (Australia Post, 1997)

Antarctic Research Ships (Australia Post, 2003)

=== Advertising ===
Murals feature in the award-winning ''Tasmania - Go Behind The Scenes'' television commercial for the Discover Tasmania website

== Awards ==
Children's Book Council of Australia Eve Pownall Book of the Year Award Notable Book 2014 for Ice, Wind, Rock: Douglas Mawson in the Antarctic

Glover Prize Children's Choice 2014 for Tasman Passage

Children's Book Council of Australia Eve Pownall Book of the Year Award Honour Book 2013 for Lyrebird!: a true story written by Jackie Kerrin

Glover Prize People's Choice 2010 for Gondwana Rococo

Children's Book Council of Australia Eve Pownall Book of the Year Award Honour Book 2007 for Queenie: One Elephants Story written by Corinne Fenton

Children's Book Council of Australia Picture Book of the Year 1994 for First Light written by Gary Crew

Children's Book Council of Australia Book of the Year Award Shortlisted Book 1993 for Grandad's Gifts written by Paul Jennings

Children's Book Council of Australia Book of the Year Award Honour Book 1992 for Hist! poem by C. J. Dennis
