= The Watertower =

Novel by Gary Crew

- Cover for The Watertower
- Author: Gary Crew
- Illustrator: Steven Woolman
- Publisher: Era Publications
- Publication date: 1994
- Media type: Hardcover & Paperback
- ISBN: 9781863743204
- Followed by: Beneath the Surface

The Watertower is a 1994 young adult's picture book written by Australian author Gary Crew and illustrated by Steven Woolman. The story, which takes place in a small rural town called Preston, is about two teenagers exploring a sinister water tower on Shooter's Hill. The illustrations for the water tower use a combination of chalk and pencil on black paper, and acrylic paint on textured board. The text is simple, while the complex illustrations create an eerie atmosphere, most notably with the recurring theme of the water tower symbol.

The book follows the codes and conventions of a subgenre of science fiction, known as gothic science fiction. It involves a "pleasing hobo sort of terror" related to gothic tradition but also has references to technology corrupting life. This is represented through the use of satellites.

In 2004, Gary Crew and Steve Woolman created a sequel to the book, Beneath the Surface.

== Awards ==
- Won - CBCA Children's Book of the Year Award: Picture Book (1995)
- Won - Books I Love Best Yearly: Read Australia Award (1995)
