= The Blue Feather =

Book by Gary Crew and Michael O'Hara

- Author: Gary Crew; Michael O'Hara
- Audio read by: David Tredinnick
- Language: English
- Genre: Fantasy, magical realism, young adult
- Published: 1997
- Publisher: Mammoth Australia
- Publication place: Australia
- Media type: Print, e-book, audiobook
- Pages: 246 pages
- ISBN: 1863307508
- OCLC: 154289044

The Blue Feather is a 1997 young adult fantasy novel that was written by Gary Crew and Michael O'Hara. The book was published through Mammoth and was shortlisted for the Western Australian Premier's Book Awards.

== Synopsis ==
Simon is a teenage boy that has never fully recovered from an incident in his past that cost him one of his eyes. His counsellors Graham and Burwood have tried to get him to come out of his protective shell, but the boy will have none of it and frequently tries to run away. However, when they introduce him to the bird sanctuary owner Greg Muir, Simon finds himself intrigued - especially when he discovers that Muir is going on a trip to the Australian outback to search for a new type of bird rumoured to have an extraordinarily large wingspan.

== Reception ==
The Courier Mail gave The Blue Feather a favourable review, stating that it was "a well-rounded book and is suitable for almost any age group over 12." The Age was more critical, as they felt that the work "rattles along though the ending is mawkish and ultimately a bit preachy."
