= Strange Objects =

1990 novel by Gary Crew

- First edition
- Author: Gary Crew
- Language: English
- Publisher: William Heinemann Australia
- Publication date: 1990
- Publication place: Australia
- Pages: 185 pp
- ISBN: 1863301135

Strange Objects is a 1990 novel by Australian author Gary Crew.

== Story outline ==
Strange Objects is set in and around Geraldton in Western Australia and is based on the shipwreck of the Dutch vessel the Batavia. Using the framing device of a collection of papers made by a missing boy, Steven Messenger, it is a mystery story that explores the construction of history. When Steven discovers relics from the wreck of the Batavia while on a school camp, (a diary and a mummified hand with a gold ring on it, the two inside an iron pot), he investigates the media frenzy surrounding them, and in particular the stories of two murderers, Wouter Loos and Jan Pelgrom, from the doomed ship who are banished to what they think is a deserted island for committing crimes of mutiny. The book parallels characters from the past and present in an exploration of human nature, and the presentation of self through the written word. It features an unusual construction, similar to Bram Stoker's Dracula in that the book is an epistolary novel; a compilation of letters, diary entries and photocopies. Hence, there is no one authoritative narrative voice, but a series of narrative voices collected in Messenger's scrapbook. Steven Messenger has several psychotic episodes and eventually kills Charlie Sunrise and a lizard in Strange Objects.

== Background ==
The book was partly a response to Australia's Bicentenary, which occurred in 1988. This event caused a revival of interest in Australian history, particularly in the "discovery" of the land. The bicentenary celebrated the landing of the "First Fleet" in 1788, and the beginning of permanent European settlement in Australia. James Cook charted the east coast of Australia in 1770, however there were a number of sightings and landings prior to this.

In Strange Objects, Gary Crew takes the premise that survivors from the Batavia, made it to the mainland, and lived with the Aboriginal people of the area. This actually happened, with European settlers noticing that the aboriginals had fair hair and more complex bush huts, which resembled their houses.

== Historical basis ==
The Batavia, the ship they were on, sunk in 1629 with 300 people on board (and the Tyrall earlier in 1622). Two hundred and fifty made it ashore, on a tiny desolate sand bank known as Beacon island. The commander Francisco Pelsaert took a long boat with 48 person and sailed to Java to get help, leaving the rest to wait.

The man who took charge was Jeronimus Cornelisz. Heretic and psychopath, he instantly rallied up a council and took charge. To maximize his control over the survivors, he left groups of soldiers on nearby islands to look for water and told them to leave their guns. When the soldiers found a water reservoirs on hospitable island (West Wallabi Island) they signalled to the rest with smoke. However, when no reply came, they became instantly suspicious.

Jeronimus and his men had killed over 120 people, with another 40 escaping to West Wallabi Island.

By the time help came, the soldiers had repelled attacks with improvised weapons, whereas the mutineers had far superior weapons. The commander and the rescue team came, and executed most of the mutineers. Two of the mutineers were set adrift with little food and water. They came ashore on the West Australian Coastline

== Themes ==
Strange Objects in part examines the place of Aboriginal people, in both historical and in contemporary contexts. The contemporary context is a poor one. The Aboriginal people live in a reserve which is tattered and ruined. They largely shun contact with white society, who refer to them by the derogatory term "Abos". We also see them in 1629. Here they are masters of the land, and more adapted to survival here than the Dutch sailors. We are also shown glimpses of the 19th century, where the Aboriginal people are largely regarded uncivilised or savage. What unfolds throughout the novel is the complexity of the Aboriginal past including its history told in rock art and passed down in oral stories.

== Awards and nominations ==
- 1991: Winner of the Australian Children's Book Council Book of the Year for Older Readers
- 1991: Winner of the 1991 Victorian Premier's Literary Award

It was also shortlisted for the Edgar Allan Poe Mystery Fiction Award (Crime writers of America).
