= Julian Laffan =

Australian educator

Julian Laffan is an Australian educator, a printmaker-artist specialising in wood-blocks, and a curator of artistic exhibitions. He has lived in historic Braidwood, New South Wales. Laffan has been a picture book judge in 2018 for the Children's Book Council of Australia (CBCA), and a judge for the 2022 Braidwood Festival of Young Writers.

== Education ==
Laffan studied at the Australian National University (ANU) School of Art and Design in Canberra, graduating in 2004, before earning a Bachelor of Education from the Australian Catholic University (ACU). After working as a teacher, he is completing research at ANU.

== Artistic approach ==
Laffan's speciality is contemporary woodcuts and drawing, specifically using wood-cut blocks as a medium in their own right. He uses these mediums, and mixed media, to create sculptural objects that explore connections with history and place, identity, and natural environment. He has worked with communities, in Australia and internationally, using both carving and relief prints to evoke "a language of connection and [a] socio-political vehicle for collaborative practice." Generally, rather than printing from his woodblocks, Laffan has featured the finished blocks as self-standing artworks.

Laffan illustrated the 2018 children's book by Gary Crew, titled Leaving the Lyrebird Forest.

== Residencies, travel, and gallery works ==
Laffan held a residency at the Canberra Contemporary Art Space (CCAS), 2004. He travels regularly and has worked on cross-cultural print projects in south-east Asia, in East Timor, Indonesia, and the Thai-Burma border. He was a key member of the Culture Kitchen, a collaborative Canberra-based print group, and also produced art works in New Zealand. Large-scale collaborative woodblock and screen-print productions (2006–2009) were created in conjunction with groups in Yogyakarta and Dili; these works were acquired by the Australian War Memorial.

In 2014, Laffan worked with St Bede's primary school in Braidwood and with local Munkata Yuin people, on a Narragunawali: Reconciliation in Schools project. The artwork produced won first prize in NSW Schools' Reconciliation challenge. They also produced an artistic garden celebrating biodiversity, with an Indigenous focus.

Laffan's works are also held by the Print Council of Australia, the Canberra Museum and Gallery, the ACT Legislative Assembly, Charles Sturt University Art Collection, and private collections.

== Exhibitions and curatorship ==
Laffan has participated in numerous solo exhibitions and group exhibitions featuring his work alongside that of fellow Australian artists, and internationally. These include:

- The fast and the furious (CCAS), 2004
- Recent Excavations, 2005
- Inside Information, 2007
- Matrix 6, 2007
- The silver light, 2008
- Every other day
- Future Archaeology, 2011
- Radio City (Altenburgh Gallery), 2013
- Toulouse-Lautrec: A contemporary view, 2013
- Footy Fever, 2015
- Momento (Suki & Hugh Gallery), 2016
- Le Monde: Observations of Place, 2017
- World Series (with Kate Stevens)
- Illuminated Artefacts (Beaver Galleries), 2019
- Home front (Beaver), 2020
- Relief (Megalo Print Studio), 2020
- Voyages, 2020
- The Return of the Archive (Megalo), 2020
- Julian Laffan (Mutual Art), 2022
- The familiar road (Beaver), 2022
- Tree Songs, 2024
- Wander Wonder, 2025

He also produced an exhibition series, to develop mentorship partnerships among established and emerging Australian artists. Curated exhibitions include:

- Inner Being (Megalo)

== Research ==
Laffan's research, through the School of Art and Design at the Australian National University, Canberra, is concerned with "the narrative life of the tree in the woodblock". It explores a liminality between trees, the structure of woodblocks (as remnants of living beings), and the prints that eventuate, and unpacks "how the lives of trees shape our understanding and our identity ... in a multi-species way", given that human beings have an "entangled relationship" with trees and with the materials we use that feeds an "aesthetic co-production between human artists and more-than-human beings".

Accordingly, with reference to Japanese and Mongolian traditions, Laffan conceptualises woodblocks as both "sacred records", and as "subject[s] with agency inscribed with material histories" that illuminate nature-cultures and speak to the disjunct between the slowness of wood growth and the rapid mass-production of modern imagery. Laffan expounds on these ideas in his publication, "Locating Traces of Arboreal Beings: Connecting the Tree and the Woodblock".

== Reviews ==
A reviewer for Canberra City News states that Laffan's images are "personal evocations" using "an idiosyncratic variation of the old craft of woodblock printing". Laffan creates, through his portraits of birds, and tree silhouettes at dusk, "a poetic atmosphere just before darkness descends, ... a time that can give rise to romantic nostalgia and evokes ... the works of the Australian artist Sydney Long (1871–1955) whose paintings created the idea of an Arcadia in the Australian landscape."
