= Gothic Hospital =

2001 book by Gary Crew

- Author: Gary Crew
- Genre: Horror
- Publisher: Lothian Books
- Publication date: 2001
- Media type: Print
- Pages: 160 pages
- ISBN: 0734402325 First edition paperback

Gothic Hospital is a 2001 young adult horror novel by Australian author Gary Crew.

Gothic Hospital was first published in Australia in 2001 through Lothian Books.

== Synopsis ==
The book focuses on a teenager named Johnny Doolan who discovers many old gothic books in his attic after his younger sister dies of tuberculosis, which results in his parents breaking up. The books' chapters are replaced by "sessions" as the book is partly set at a psychiatrist's office.

In the book, Johnny claims to his psychiatrist that when he reads the books in his attic, the book "fills itself in" with colour, and Johnny becomes part of the story. One book Johnny particularly becomes engrossed in, is a book about an old Gothic hospital, and Johnny eventually believes that his father is trapped in the book.

== Excerpt ==
An excerpt from the novel was published in The Courier-Mail in May 2001.
