= Beneath the Surface (picture book) =

Book by Gary Crew

- First edition
- Author: Gary Crew
- Illustrator: Steve Woolman
- Publisher: Hodder Children's Books Australia
- Publication date: 2004
- Preceded by: The Watertower

Beneath the Surface (ISBN 9780733619328) is a children's picture book by the author Gary Crew and illustrated by Steven Woolman. It is a sequel to The Watertower. It was published in 2004, 10 years after its predecessor.

It is about Dr Spiro Trotter, aka Spike from The Watertower, who is a hydrologist. He returns to Preston, twenty years from the events of the last novel, to test the water in the mysterious watertower on the hill. The words in the book describe Spike's actions, while the pictures on each page skip all around the world. Spike drinks the water and gets possessed.
