= Gary Crew =

Australian writer of young adult fiction

Gary Crew OAM
- Born: 23 September 1947 (age 78); Brisbane, Queensland
- Education: University of the Sunshine Coast
- Occupation: Writer
- Writing career
- Genres: Children's books, young adult fiction

Gary David Crew (born 23 September 1947) is an Australian writer of young adult fiction.

== Awards ==
Crew was awarded the Medal of the Order of Australia in the 2025 King's Birthday Honours.

He has won the Australian Children's Book of the Year on four occasions.

Children's Book of the Year Award: Older Readers

- 1991 Strange Objects
- 1994 Angel's Gate

Children's Book of the Year Award: Picture Book

- 1994 First Light (Illustrator Peter Gouldthorpe)
- 1995 The Watertower (Illustrator Stephen Woolman)

Alan Marshall Prize for Children's Literature

- 1991 Strange Objects

New South Wales Premier's Literary Award

- 1991 Strange Objects

== Bibliography ==
- The Inner Circle (1986)
- Strange Objects (1990)
- No Such Country (1991)
- The Last Cabinet for compilation of stories "The Blue Dress" (1991)
- Lucy's Bay (1992) (with Gregory Rogers)
- Tracks (1992) (with Gregory Rogers)
- The House of Tomorrow (1992)
- The Well (After Dark series, 1992) (with Narelle Oliver)
- Angel's Gate (1994)
- Inventing Anthony West (1994)
- The Bent Back Bridge (After Dark series, 1994)
- The Watertower series
  - The Watertower (1994)
  - Beneath the Surface (2005)
- The Barn (After Dark series, 1995)
- Emu Parade (1995) (with Viva La Wombat, Illustrator)
- Dark house: stories (1995) (compiled by Gary Crew)
- The Lost Diamonds of Killiecrankie (1995) (with Peter Gouldthorpe)
- The Figures of Julian Ashcroft (1996) (with Hans de Hass, Illustrator)
- Caleb (1996) (with Steve Woolman)
- Crew's 13 : classic tales of the macabre & fantastic (1997) (with Shaun Tan, Illustrator)
- The Blue Feather (1997) (with Michael O' Hara)
- The Viewer (1997) (with Shaun Tan, Illustrator)
- Force of Evil (1998) (with Shaun Tan), Illustrator)
- Troy Thompson's excellent peotry [sic] book (1998) (with Craig Smith)
- The Fort (After Dark series, 1998) (with Gregory Rogers)
- The Windmill Trilogy series
  - The Windmill (1998) (with Steve Woolman, Illustrator)
  - The Cave (1999) (with Steve Woolman, Illustrator)
  - The Survivors (1999) (with Steve Woolman, Illustrator)
- The Grandstand (After Dark series, 1999) (with Peter Hollard)
- Memorial (1999) (with Shaun Tan, Illustrator)
- Troy Thompson's radical prose folio (2000) (with Craig Smith)
- Dear Venny, Dear Saffron (2000) (with Libby Hathorn)
- Edward Britton (2000)
- Leo the Lion Tamer (2000) (with Leigh Hobbs)
- In My Father's Room (2000) (with Annmarie Scott)
- Mama's Babies (1998)
- The Grandstand (2000)
- Gino the genius (2000) (with James Cattell, Illustrator)
- Valley of Bones (2000) (with Mark Wilson)
- Cruel Nest (2001)
- The Rainbow (2001) (with Gregory Rogers)
- Arno the Garbo (2001) (with Craig Smith, Illustrator)
- The Kraken (2001) (with Marc McBride, Illustrator)
- Gothic Hospital (2001)
- The Castaways of the Charles Eaton (2002) (with Mark Wilson)
- Quetta (2002) (with Bruce Whatley)
- The diviner's son (2002)
- Old Ridley (2002) (with Marc McBride, Illustrator)
- I saw nothing: the extinction of the Thylacine (2003)
- Cabinets of Curiosity (2003)
- The Viewer (2003) (with Shaun Tan, Illustrator)
- I Said Nothing: The Extinction of the Paradise Parrot (2003) (with Mark Wilson, Illustrator)
- I Did Nothing: The Extinction of the Gastric-Brooding Frog (2004) (with Mark Wilson, Illustrator)
- In the Wake of the Mary Celeste (2004) (with Robert Ingpen)
- Pig on the Titanic: A True Story (2004) (with Bruce Whatley, Illustrator)
- Me and my dog (2005)
- The Lace Maker's Daughter (2005)
- Young Murphy: A Boy's Adventure (2005) (with Mark Wilson, Illustrator)
- The Lantern (2005) (with Bruce Whatley, Illustrator)
- The Mystery of Eilean Mor (2005) (with Jeremy Geddes, Illustrator)
- The Plague of Quentaris (2005)
- Sam Silverthorne : Quest (2005)
- Sam Silverthorne : Menace (2006)
- Sam Silverthorne : Victory (2007)
- Stolen children of Quentaris (2006)
- Automaton (2006) (with Aaron Hill, Illustrator)
- The Saw Doctor (2006) (with David Cox, Illustrator)
- The End of the Line (2007)
- The Truth about Emma (2007)
- Cat on the Island (2007) (with Gillian Warden)
- The End of the Line (2008) (with Gregory Rogers)
- Finding Home (2009) (with Suzy Boyer)
- The Children's Writer (2009)
- The Serpent's Tale (2010) (with Matt Ottley, Illustrator)
- Damon (2011) (with Aaron Hill, Illustrator)
- The Architecture of Song (2012)
- In the Beech Forest (2012) (with Den Scheer, Illustrator)
- The boy who grew into a tree (2013) (with Ross Watkins, Illustrator)
- The Cuckoo (2014) ( with Naomi Turvey, Illustrator)
- "The Cornfield" (2014) (with Aaron Hill illustrator)
- Rich and Rare (2015((contributor...short story)) Paul Collins (with Paul O'Sullivan, Illustrator)
- Voicing the dead (2015)
- The Visions of Ichabod X (2015) (with Paul O'Sullivan, Illustrator)
- Timing the Machine (2016) (With Paul O'Sullivan, Illustrator)
- "The Story of Eva Carmichael the wreck of the Loch Ard" (2018) ( With Paul OSullivan, Illustrator )
- Leaving the Lyrebird Forest (2018) / Gary Crew; illustrated by Julian Laffan (woodblock artist).
- 'The Secret Place' (2023)
