= Karen Brooks (author) =

Australian author, columnist and social commentator, and academic

- Born: Sydney, New South Wales
- Writing career
- Pen name: Karen R Brooks
- Genre: Historical Fiction
- Notable works: Tallow, Votive, Illumination
- Website: www.karenrbrooks.com

Karen Brooks is an Australian author, columnist, social commentator and academic. She writes fantasy novels for children and young adults, under both Karen Brooks and Karen R. Brooks and has also published short stories and non-fiction works. Since completing her fantasy trilogy, The Curse of the Bond Riders, she has focused on writing standalone novels.

== Life ==
Brooks was born Sydney, New South Wales, and now lives in Hobart, Tasmania, with her partner and two children. Brooks was a member of the "Brains Trust" on the ABC TV quiz show, The Einstein Factor and she was listed in the inaugural edition Who's Who of Australian Women (2007). Her non-fiction book, 'Consuming Innocence: Popular Culture And Our Children' (2008), examined the complex relationship that children have with popular culture and addressed the roles that both popular culture and parents play in creating children's ideas of themselves.

In 2007, Brooks received a citation from the Carrick Institute for Learning and Teaching in Higher Education, part of an Australian Government program to recognise and reward teaching excellence in higher education, for sustained public engagement in the field of communication and cultural studies resulting in both theoretical and practical learning outcomes for students. The following year, in recognition for her work at the institution over the previous eleven years and, in particular, for her development of a new method of teaching popular culture. Brooks was made Honorary Senior Fellow of the University of the Sunshine Coast.

Brooks is currently an Honorary Research Consultant in the Centre for Critical and Cultural Studies, at the University of Queensland, where she lectures in the areas of media, youth, sexuality and popular culture using a psychoanalytical model. She has established both a national and international reputation for her work, and her research and social commentary is regularly published in Australia and overseas.

== Bibliography: Fiction ==
=== Cassandra Klein Series ===
- It's Time, Cassandra Klein (Lothian, 2001)
- The Gaze of the Gorgon (Lothian, 2002)
- The Book of Night (Lothian, 2003)
- The Kurs of Atlantis (Lothian, 2004)

=== The Quentaris Chronicles ===
- Rifts Through Quentaris (Lothian, 2005)

=== The Curse of the Bond Riders ===
- Tallow (Random House, 2009)
- Votive (Random House, 2011)
- Illumination (Random House, 2012)

=== Standalone novels ===
- The Locksmith's Daughter (2016)
- The Chocolate Maker's Wife (2019)
- The Brewer’s Tale (2014)
- The Darkest Shore (2020)
- The Good Wife of Bath (2021)
- The Escapades of Tribulation Johnson (2023)
- The Whisky Widow (2025)
- The Extraordinary Florence Stoker (2026)

=== Short stories ===
- "Men in White", Hecate (Vol.23, No.1, 1997)
- "Once Upon Some Rose-Tips", Imago (Volume 10, No.2, 1998)
- "True Lies", Imago (Volume 12, No.1, 1999)
- "Blame it on the Shadow", Difficult Love: Twenty-Six Stories by Contemporary Queensland Writers (CUQP, 2000)
- "Sleeping Positions", Imago (Vol.12, No.2, 2000)
- "Untitled", Mother Love (Penguin, 2008)

== Bibliography: Academic ==
=== Books ===
- Consuming Innocence: Popular Culture and Our Children, UQP: Brisbane, February 2008. ISBN 978-0-7022-3645-7

=== Monographs ===
- Through the Looking Glass: Terrestrial and Psychological Oppositions in the Expatriate Condition in Shirley Hazzard's Transit of Venus, Studies in Western Traditions, Occasional Papers No.7. Department of Arts, La Trobe University, Bendigo, pp. 76. ISBN 0909977356.

=== Book chapters ===
- "Did You hear the one About... Diana, Death and Drollery" in I. Ang, H. Grace, Z. Sofoulis & R. Barcan (eds) Global Mourning: A Collection of Cultural Studies Perspectives on the Death of Diana, 1997, Sydney: Research Centre in Intercommunal Studies, University of Western Sydney, pp. 139–144.
- "Re(pre)senting youth: Images of Young People in Contemporary Film" in L. Finch & C. McConville (eds) Gritty Cities: Images of the Urban. Melbourne: Pluto Press, 1999: 65–74.
- "Charmian Clift and Travelography: The Discourse of Self-Begetting" in A. Lear & P. Sharrad (eds) Self, Life and Writing. West Yorkshire: Dangaroo Press, 2000: 72–81.
- "Wussy Boys: Masculinity in the New Millennium" (with C. McConville) in S. Pearce & V. Mueller (eds) Manning the Next Millennium. Fremantle: Black Swan Press, 2002: 241–253.
- "Bride of Frankenstein: Technology and the consumption of the female athlete" (with T. Magdalinski) in (eds) Andy Miah and Simon B. Eassom. Sport Technology: History, Philosophy and Policy. Kidlington, Oxford, Elsevier Science, 2002: 195–212.
- "Nothing Sells Like Teen Spirit: The Commodification of Youth Culture" in S. Pearce & K. Mallan (eds) Youth Cultures: Texts, images, and Identities. Connecticut: Greenwood Press, 2003: 1–16.
- "Charmian Clift" in The Literary Encyclopaedia. Ed. Robert Clark, Emory Elliott & Janet Todd. 2005.
- "Shirley Hazzard" in The Literary Encyclopaedia. Ed. Robert Clark, Emory Elliott & Janet Todd. 2005.
- "Glenda Adams" in Dictionary of Literary Biography 325: Australian Writers, 1950–2000. Edited by Selina Samuels. Bruccoli Clark Layman Publishers: Detroit, NY, London etc. 2007, pp. 3–9.
- "'Wayne's World': Media Narratives of the Decline and Fall of Australian Football King Wayne Carey" (with Jim Mckay) in Fallen Sports Heroes, Media and Celebrity Culture. Edited by Lawrence A. Wenner. New York:: Peter Lang, 2012.

=== Publications in textbooks ===
- "Texting turns nasty" in Legal Studies in Action 2', 3rd edition by Gray. Milton: John Wiley and Sons, 2008
- "The Robot Revolution" in Pressing Questions: Explorations in Sociology, French's Forest: Person Education, 2008, p. 96

=== Publications in journals ===
- "Odysseus Unbound: Singing with the Sirens: Liminality and Stasis in Glenda Adams' Dancing on Coral", New Literatures Review, 28/29 (1994/1995): 55–64.
- "Staging Sex: Carlotta: The Boy From Balmain" (with S. Scott), Media International Australia, 84 (May, 1997): 67–73.
- "Shit Creek: Abjection, Subjectivity and Suburbia in Australian 'Grunge' Fiction", Australian Literary Studies, (October, 1998): 1–15.
- "Cross(dress)ing the Queer Divide: Homosexuality, Homosociality and Gender Blending in Australian Film", Antipodes. 13.2 (December, 1999): 85–90.
- "More Than A Game: The Footy Show, Fandom and The Construction of Football Celebrities," Football Studies 3.1 (April, 2000): 27–48.
- "Comfortably Numb: Young People, Drugs and the Seductions of Popular Culture," Youth Studies Australia, (Vol 2:2) 2006, 9–16.
- "Honey, I Shrunk the Library: Technology, Cyberspace and Knowledge Culture in the New Millennium," Australian School Librarian Association National Journal, ACCESS (by request). Vol 21.1 (2007): 21–26.
- "Education Wars: Deciphering and Balancing the Postmodern Curriculum" (with Bruce Williams), Screen, July 2007.
- "An Impossible Passion: Contemporary Popular Culture, Young People and Reading," Australian School Librarian Association National Journal, ACCESS (by request). Vol 22. 3 (2008): 19–28.
- "Resistance is futile: 'Reaccenting' the present to create meaningful educational dialogies in the future," Pedagogies: An International Journal, 1554–4818. Volume 6, Issue 1, 2011, 66–80.
