= University of the Sunshine Coast =

Public university in Queensland, Australia

- Motto: For a better tomorrow
- Type: Public research university
- Established: 1 July 1994; 32 years ago
- Accreditation: TEQSA
- Academic affiliations: RUN; OUA; UA
- Budget: A$381.84 million (2024)
- Chancellor: Angus Houston
- Vice-Chancellor: Helen Bartlett
- Faculty: 471 (2024)
- Administrative staff: 748 (2024)
- Total staff: 1,219 (2024)
- Students: 18,688 (2024)
- Undergraduates: 10,607 by Equivalent Full-Time Student Load (EFTSL) (2024)
- Postgraduates: 512 coursework by EFTSL (2024); 324 research by EFTSL (2024)
- Other students: 636 by EFTSL (2024)
- Location: 90 Sippy Downs Drive, Sunshine Coast, Queensland, 4556, Australia; 26.7171°S 153.0631°E
- Campus: 100 hectares (1.0 km^{2}); Suburban, regional and parkland with multiple sites
- Colours: Blue Gold
- Sporting affiliations: UniSport; EAEN; UBL
- Website: usc.edu.au

The University of the Sunshine Coast (UniSC; formerly abbreviated as USC until 2022) is a public university based on the Sunshine Coast, Queensland, Australia. After opening with 524 students in 1996 as the Sunshine Coast University College, it was later renamed the University of the Sunshine Coast in 1999.

The university has a flagship campus at Sippy Downs on the Sunshine Coast, with more campuses at Hervey Bay on the Fraser Coast, Gympie, and Caboolture. In 2020, USC opened a full-service campus at Petrie in Moreton Bay; and later opened a postgraduate campus in Adelaide, South Australia.

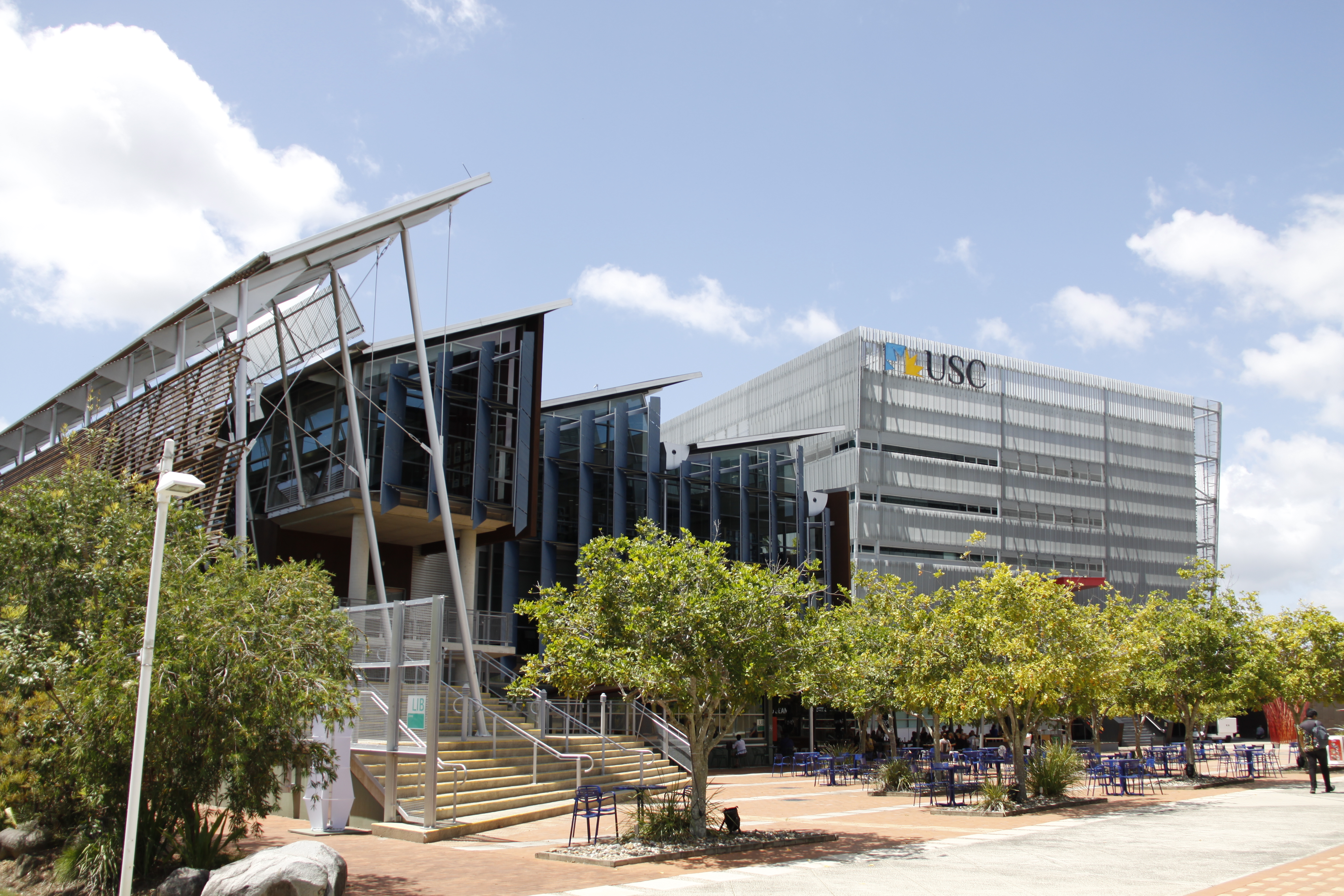
USC Sippy Downs campus 2019

Undergraduate and postgraduate (coursework and higher degree by research) programs are available, with study areas divided across five schools: business and creative industries; education and tertiary access; health; law and society; and science, technology and engineering.

The university is listed on the Commonwealth Register of Institutions and Courses for Overseas Students.

In the 2020 Student Experience Survey, UniSC was ranked within the top five universities in Australia for teaching quality, and in the top six for the overall student experience.

== History ==
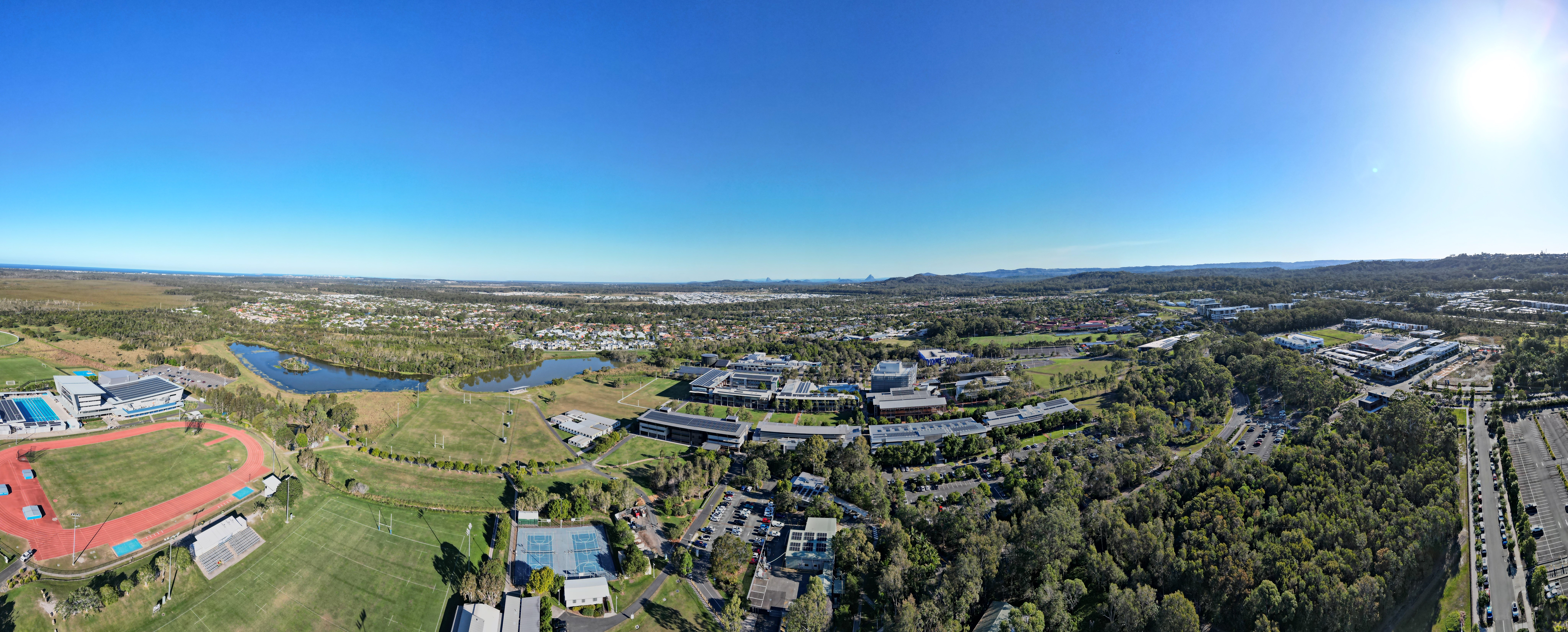
Aerial panorama of The University of the Sunshine Coast. 2023.

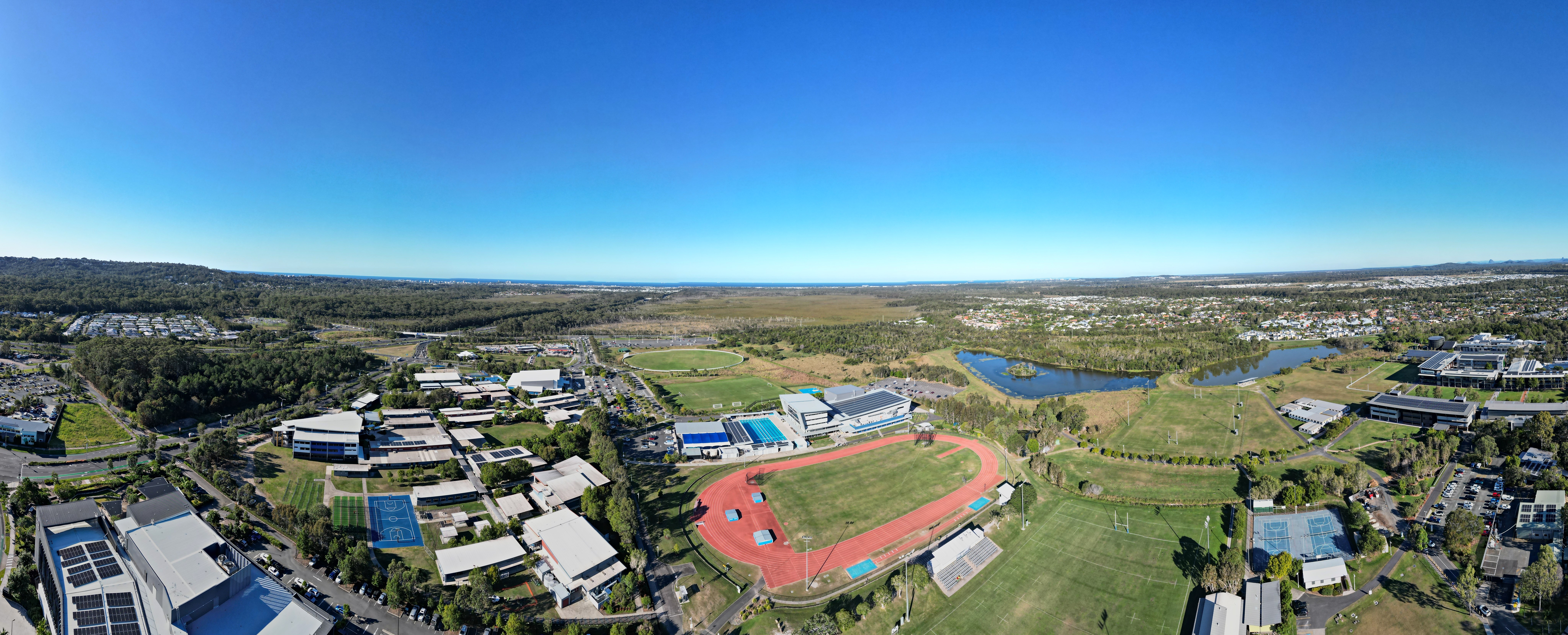
Aerial vista of The University of the Sunshine Coast and its surrounds. 2023.

The first discussions about a university for the Sunshine Coast region began in 1973. In 1989, the Australian Federal Government approved its establishment. On 1 July 1994 the Queensland Parliament passed the Sunshine Coast University College Act 1994.

The university was established in 1994, opening in 1996 as the Sunshine Coast University College. The University of the Sunshine Coast Act 1998 was passed in Queensland Parliament on 19 November of that year, legislating the independent status of the university. The university changed to its current name of the University of the Sunshine Coast (USC; UniSC from July 2022) in 1999. It was created by the Australian Government to serve the growing population of the Sunshine Coast region, north of Brisbane, in Queensland. The University of the Sunshine Coast is the first greenfield university established in Australia since 1971.

The inaugural vice-chancellor was Paul Thomas, AM, who took office with effect from 1 January 1996, having spent an earlier period as planning president. UniSC's second vice-chancellor, Professor Greg Hill AO, took over from Professor Thomas AM in 2011 after starting at the university in 2005 as deputy vice-chancellor. He stayed in the role until August 2020 when Professor Helen Bartlett joined as the university's third vice-chancellor.

Justice Gerald “Tony” Fitzgerald was the university's inaugural chancellor, followed by pastoralist Ian Kennedy, AO, who was UniSC's second chancellor. Air Chief Marshal Sir Angus Houston AK, AFC (Ret'd) became the university's fourth chancellor when he was appointed to the role in 2017 after John Dobson OAM retired from the position. Sir Angus remains the university's current chancellor.

The student body has grown consistently since the university opened in 1996 with an intake of 524 students. In 2020, UniSC had 18,150 students enrolled.

The university introduced paid parking at its Sippy Downs campus from February 2013, a move that garnered a negative response from some students and staff. Of the university's 2,400 parking spaces, approximately 450 (located 1 kilometre (0.62 mi) from the centre of campus) remain as free parking. Some of the parking has solar canopies, which along with campus roofs supply 2.1 MW of solar electricity (5 GWh/year). The power is also used to cool 4.5 million liters of water for air conditioning, estimated to save AU$100 million over 25 years.

== Campuses and buildings ==
The Sippy Downs campus in Sippy Downs, Queensland is the university’s primary campus with 12,724 students in 2021. It is about 100 kilometres (62 mi) north of Brisbane on a 100-hectare flora and fauna reserve, and borders the Mooloolah River National Park. The site was previously a sugar cane farm, at the geographical heart of the Sunshine Coast and its shires, close to the Bruce Highway and other major transport routes.

The buildings on campus have received 30 awards for planning, architecture and construction. In 2000, the university received the Royal Australian Institute of Architects President's Award, and in 1997 the Library was awarded the Sir Zelman Cowen Award for Public Buildings.

All buildings on campus focus on environmentally sustainable design to suit the subtropical climate of the Sunshine Coast. Buildings have been designed for passive lighting and natural ventilation to minimise the use of non-renewable energy.

In 2007, the university opened three new buildings, the A$12 million science building, the A$13 million chancellery and the A$10 million indoor sports stadium. A year later, Federal Treasurer Wayne Swan opened the A$13 million Health and Sport Centre, which has testing and research laboratories, a gymnasium and public psychology clinic. Medical training is also carried out at the Sunshine Coast Health Institute (SCHI) and the Sunshine Coast University Hospital (SCUH).

In August 2010, construction started on a $5 million semi-industrial shared space facility for engineering and paramedic science students. This opened in May 2011 and has specialised equipment and large, open spaces suitable for medical emergency simulations and a wide variety of engineering tests and experiments. It also has several laboratories and tutorial rooms.

In November 2010, construction started on the university pool complex, which includes a 50m heated Olympic swimming pool for research and community use. The complex was officially opened on 19 October 2011, by Queensland Sport Minister Phil Reeves. Funding for the $2.1 million project was owned by the Queensland State Government, the university, community donations, and through in-kind support.

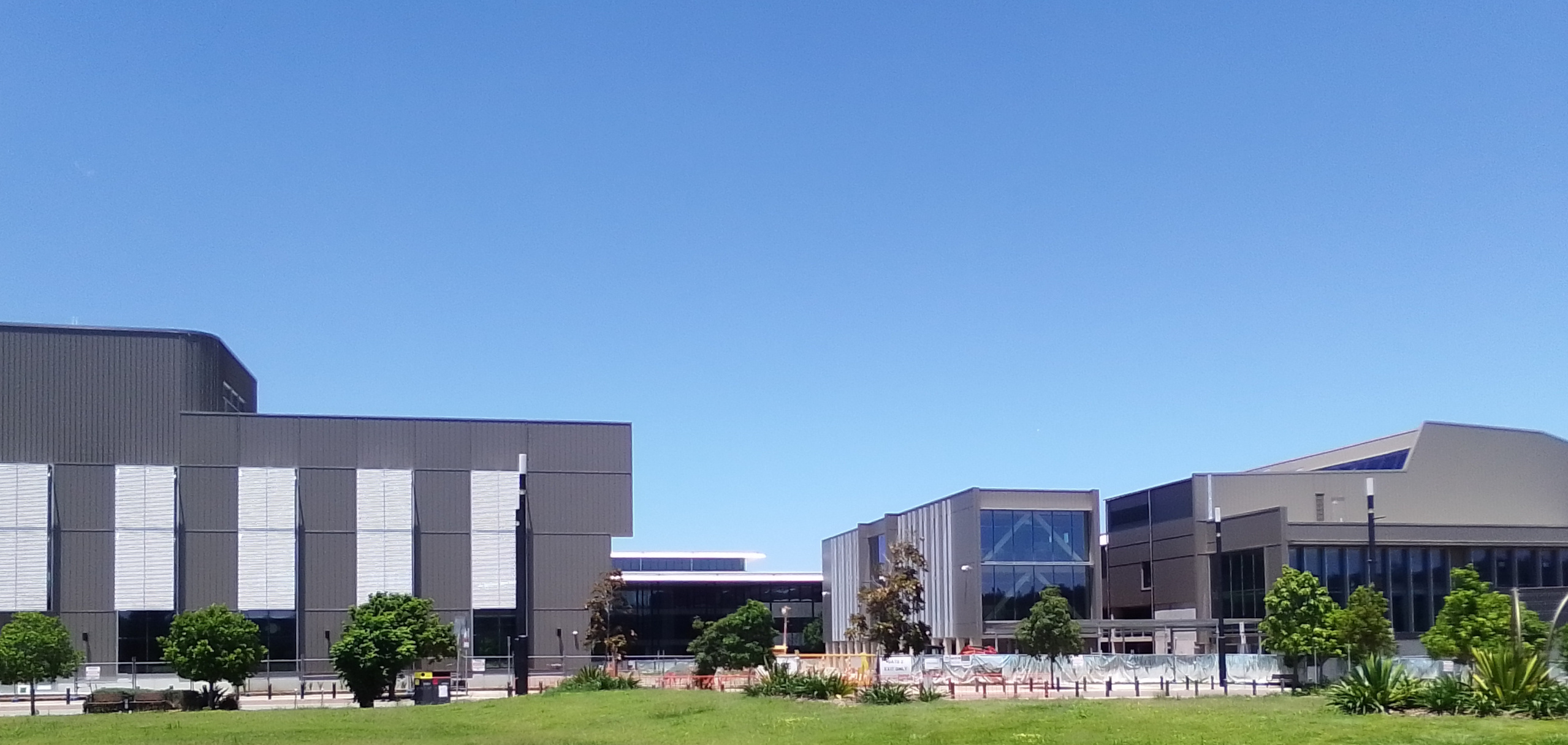
The University of the Sunshine Coast (UniSC): Moreton Bay Campus

== Governance and structure ==
=== University Council ===
The University Council is the governing body with the chancellor presiding over council meetings. The council has 19 members including the chancellor drawn from the university staff, student body and wider community.

==== Chancellor and Vice-Chancellor ====
The current chancellor of the university is Air Chief Marshal Sir Angus Houston, a retired senior officer of the Royal Australian Air Force.

=== Academic Board ===
The academic board is the university's senior academic body. It advises the council concerning teaching, scholarship and research matters, formulates proposals for the academic policies of the university, monitors the academic activities of the university's faculties, and promotes and encourages scholarship and research at the university.

== Academic profile ==
=== Research and publications ===
The University of the Sunshine Coast's research focus is on healthy people and a healthy planet. The University has two research institutes and five centres broadly aligned around these themes. They are:

==== Thompson Institute ====
The Thompson Institute combines research, clinical services and education to facilitate the translation of research findings into practice. Its key focus area is neuroscience, through which it aims to deepen the understanding of mental health and its relationship with brain structure and function.

==== Forest Research Institute ====
The Forest Research Institute undertakes work in the broad spectrum of forestry research areas, including areas such as smallholder and forest conservation-based research, along with work to ensure industries are meeting regulatory requirements and public expectations.

The Institute consists of three Centres, each with an individual identity and research focus.

==== Clinical Trials ====
UniSC Clinical Trials operate in the Sunshine Coast, Moreton Bay and Brisbane regions, working with the medical industry to trial new treatments and therapies.

- Centre for Human Factors and Sociotechnical Systems
- Centre for Bioinnovation
- Australian Centre for Pacific Islands Research
- Indigenous and Transcultural Research Centre

The UniSC Research Bank provides open access to the University of the Sunshine Coast's research output. The database ensures the research output of the university is accessible to local, national and international communities.

In June 2011 the university was announced as one of 12 projects to receive Australian government funding under the Collaborative Research Networks (CRN) program. In the period 2011 to 2014 the university will receive $5.45 million to fund research in water, sustainability, forestry and aquaculture.

==== Australian Research Council grants ====
The university received two Australian Research Council Discovery grants, worth more than $1 million, in the 2012 funding round announced in November 2011:

- Scott Cummins was awarded a $656,377 ARC Future Fellowship for his study of primordial germ cell migration in perciform fish, titled: "Decoding the rules of fate, attraction and cell migration in perciform fish". The ARC grant will be coupled with Dr Cummins' ARC Discovery Project Grant for $145,000 over 2012 to 2014 for research into snail hypometabolism, enabling him to build a significant team of researchers conducting world-class research in the field of the biological sciences.
- Roland De Marco, Pro Vice-Chancellor for Research and joint chief investigator in a project called “New mesoporous materials for use in high temperature proton exchange fuel cell membranes”, gained a three-year ARC Discovery Project grant of $420,000, with $40,000 each year going to support a PhD student at the university. The research involves using synchrotron radiation techniques to develop innovative fuel cell materials with the potential to provide high energy and high stability alcohol fuel cells.

Other 2011 ARC funding:

- Kate Mounsey won a $375,000 competitive grant for research into the contagious skin infection, scabies, titled: "A porcine model to provide new insights on scabies immunopathology". Her study was one of 277 projects selected from 2,159 applications nationally for funding under the ARC's new Discovery Early Career Researcher Award (DECRA) scheme. The ARC grant will be coupled with Dr Mounsey's award of a National Health and Medical Research Council (NHMRC) Project grant of $483,510 (in collaboration with UniSC's Associate Professor Shelley Walton) on a related project over the same timeframe.
- The university was announced as a partner in three successful ARC Linkage Infrastructure Equipment and Facilities grants, involving Cummins (via the University of Queensland), De Marco (via Curtin University) and Senior Lecturer in Environmental Microbiology, Ipek Kurtboke (via the University of Queensland).

=== Galleries and exhibitions ===
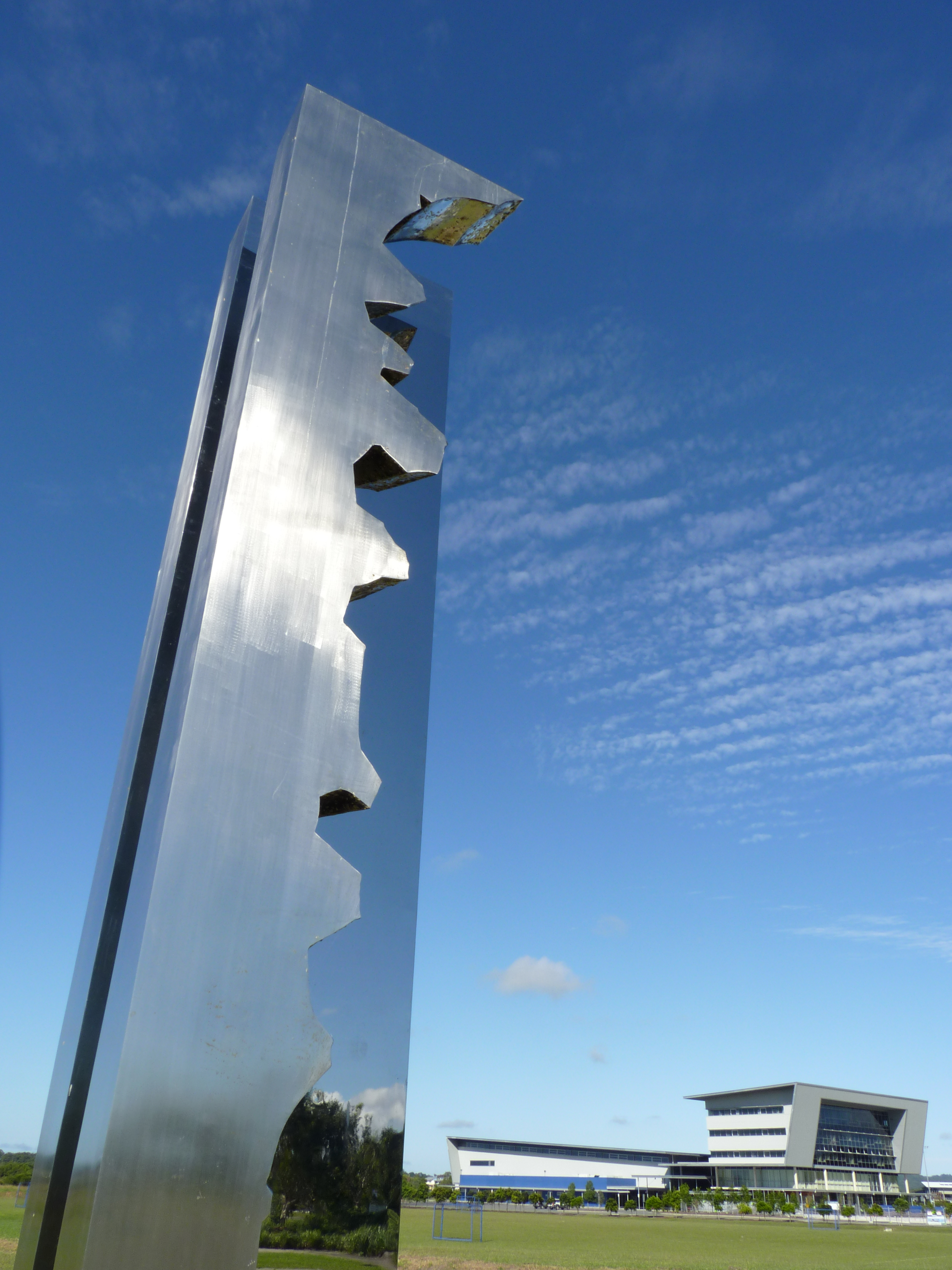
Leonard Sabol, Between sculpture with USC Health and Sport Centre in background

The University of the Sunshine Coast Gallery hosts a range of exhibitions focusing on contemporary art and design. The annual exhibition program includes:

- new media (including computer-based design)
- photography
- painting, drawing and sculpture
- illustration
- student exhibitions

The gallery is in the heart of the university campus, with more than half of the annual attendance being educational visitors (UniSC students and staff, U3A, TAFE, primary and high school students).

In 2013, UniSC opened a Gympie campus before taking over a Fraser Coast campus from the University of Southern Queensland in 2016. The university also operates an education and research facility at Dilli Village on Fraser Island.

The university's geographical expansion continued in 2018 with the transfer of the Queensland University of Technology's Caboolture campus to UniSC's control.

The move into the region just north of Brisbane preceded UniSC's greenfield development of Moreton Bay's first full-scale university campus at Petrie, which opened in 2020.

==== Art and sculpture collection ====
Since its inception, the University of the Sunshine Coast has worked to develop an art collection focusing on contemporary Australian art with an emphasis on Queensland artists. Many of these works can be viewed throughout the university campus. The university collection includes several sculptures in public spaces on the campus.

The university's collection of contemporary Australian Art includes one of the most significant collections of Western and Central Desert Australian Aboriginal Art on the Sunshine Coast.

=== Other sub-units ===
The University of the Sunshine Coast has one subsidiary company – Innovation Centre Sunshine Coast Pty Ltd. At the northern end of the campus, this is the first stage of a planned technology park precinct for Sippy Downs. The Innovation Centre comprises a business incubator for start-up technology businesses and a business accelerator for established technology, knowledge-based, and professional service firms.

The Innovation Centre provides serviced office space, high speed optical fibre Internet connection, business development coaching and support. As of July 2010, the Innovation Centre has supported the start-up and growth of around 80 businesses, mainly in ICT, cleantech and creative industry sectors.

=== Academic reputation ===
University rankings

Global – Overall
- ARWU World: 801–900 (2025)
- CWTS World: 1182 (Note: The CWTS Leiden Ranking is based on P (top 10%).) (2024)
- QS World: 1001–1200 (2025)
- THE World: 501–600 (2026)
- USNWR Global: 1048 (25/26)

National – Overall
- ARWU National: 28–29 (2025)
- CWTS National: 32 (2024)
- ERA National: 30 (2018)
- QS National: 37 (2025)
- THE National: 33–35 (2026)
- USNWR National: 35 (25/26)
- AFR National: =31 (2025)

National publications

In the Australian Financial Review Best Universities Ranking 2025, the university was tied #31 amongst Australian universities.

Global publications

In the 2025 Quacquarelli Symonds World University Rankings (published 2024), the university attained a position of #1001–1200 (37th nationally).

In the Times Higher Education World University Rankings 2026 (published 2025), the university attained a position of #501–600 (33–35th nationally).

In the 2025 Academic Ranking of World Universities, the university attained a position of #801–900 (tied 28–29th nationally).

In the 2025–2026 U.S. News & World Report Best Global Universities, the university attained a tied position of #1048 (35th nationally).

In the CWTS Leiden Ranking 2024, the university attained a position of #1182 (32nd nationally).

=== Student outcomes ===
The Australian Government's QILT (Note: Abbreviation for Quality Indicators for Learning and Teaching.) conducts national surveys documenting the student life cycle from enrolment through to employment. These surveys place more emphasis on criteria such as student experience, graduate outcomes and employer satisfaction than perceived reputation, research output and citation counts.

In the 2023 Employer Satisfaction Survey, graduates of the university had an overall employer satisfaction rate of 88.2%.

In the 2023 Graduate Outcomes Survey, graduates of the university had a full-time employment rate of 78.2% for undergraduates and 86.2% for postgraduates. The initial full-time salary was A$70,000 for undergraduates and A$81,300 for postgraduates.

In the 2023 Student Experience Survey, undergraduates at the university rated the quality of their entire educational experience at 80.4% meanwhile postgraduates rated their overall education experience at 78.9%.

== Student life ==
=== Sports and athletics ===
The university features UniSC Arena, an indoor arena used often for netball matches and other sporting activities. Since February 2017 the arena has been the home stadium for Super Netball team Sunshine Coast Lightning. The arena has a seating capacity of 2,200 and features broadcasting facilities and several corporate boxes. As a result of growing demand for the Lightning amongst the public, the venue was upgraded to 3,000 seats and also featured new change rooms, a function room, public bathrooms and an improved sound system; all of which was completed in May 2019.

=== Student accommodation ===
Three student accommodation complexes are next to the campus in Chancellor Park. Varsity Apartments, UniCentral and The Village are privately owned and operated. All are within walking distance of the campus, linked by pedestrian pathways.

Each accommodation complex has furnished apartments, some with Internet connection. The general layout in an apartment is a shared kitchen and living room, with four single bedrooms, each with its own bathroom and toilet. The complexes are gated and have barbecues, pools and outdoor sports courts (such as tennis/basketball and volleyball). Many of these units are shared units, however each student has his/her own bedroom and bathroom, only sharing the main living spaces. Many complexes also mix the residents between local and international students for a well engaged cross cultural experience.

=== Transportation ===
University of the Sunshine Coast is serviced by Translink bus routes, operated by Kinetic Sunshine Coast. Services depart to Caloundra, Nambour, Maroochydore and Kawana, with connecting services to Noosa at Maroochydore's Sunshine Plaza interchange, and connecting to rail services at Landsborough station. Services enter and depart from the new bus station via the Green Link.

== Notable people ==
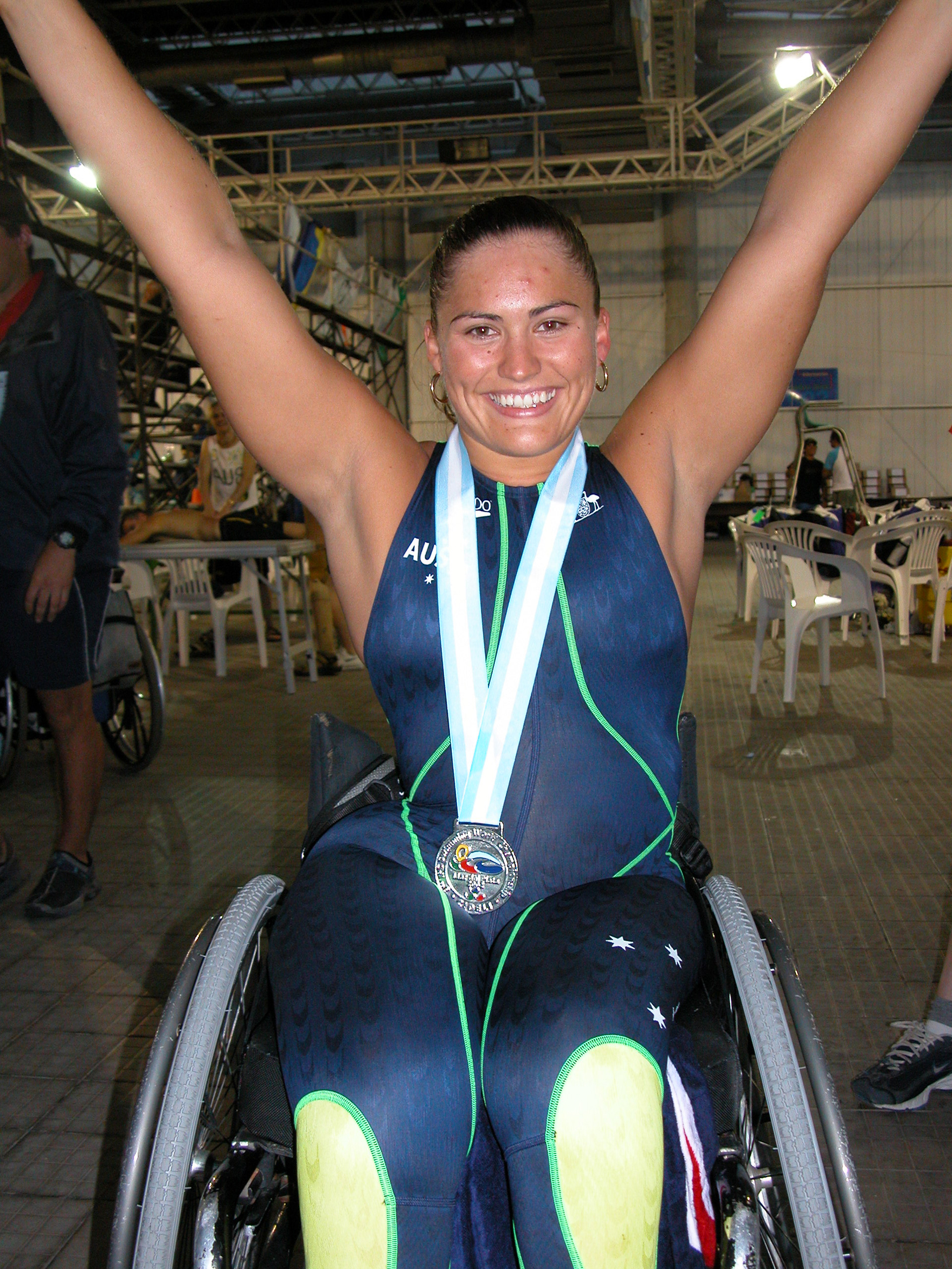
Marayke Jonkers, Paralympic athlete

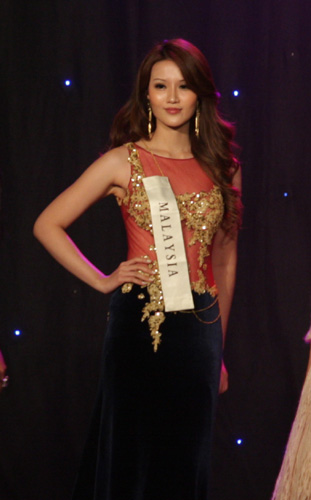
Soo Wincci, Miss World Malaysia 2008

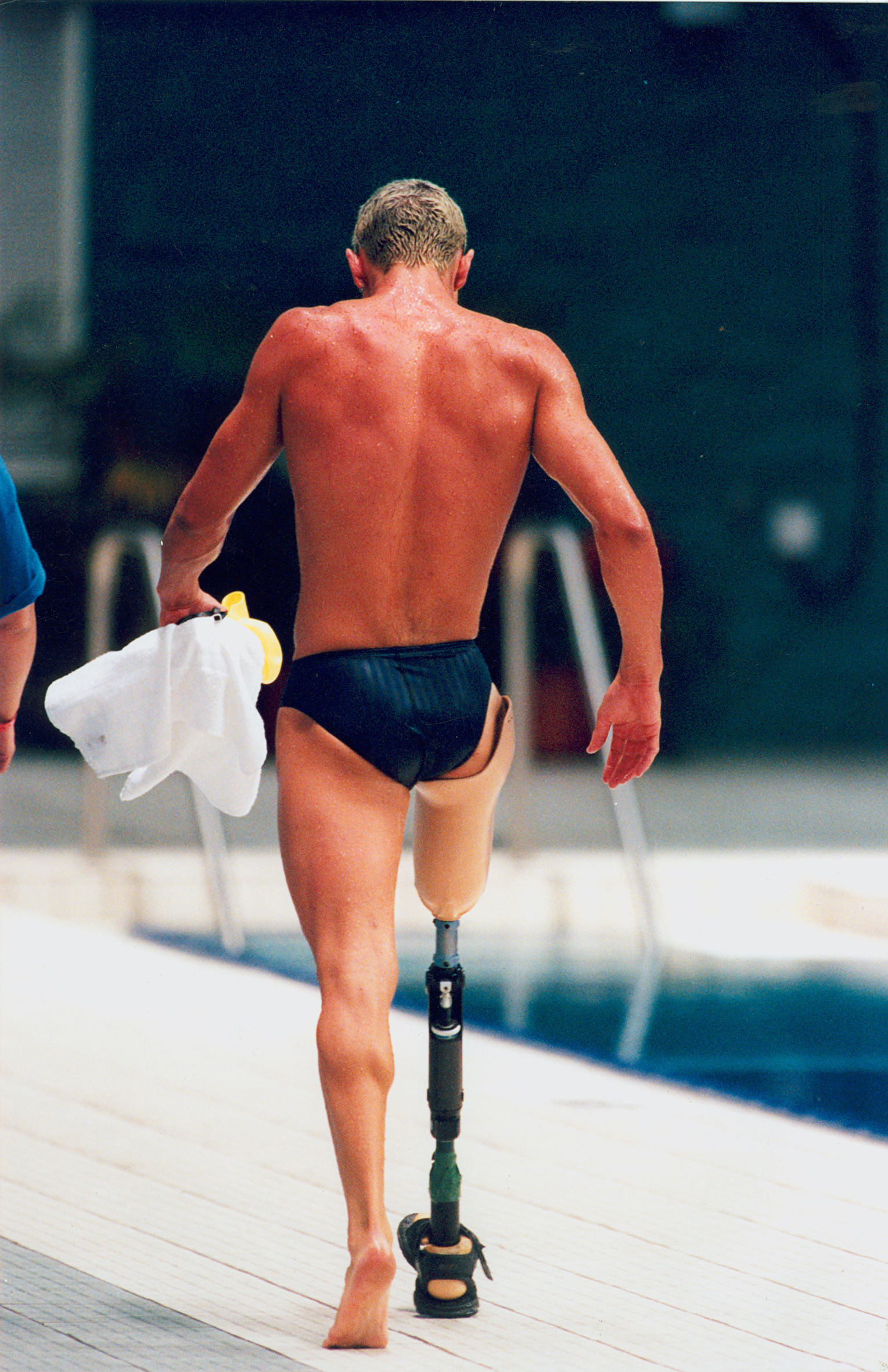
Brendan Burkett, OAM, a medal winner at four Paralympic Games

=== Alumni ===
- Ashley Noffke, former professional Australian cricketer
- The Hon Jarrod Bleijie MP JP, politician in the Queensland parliament
- Karen Foxlee, award-winning novelist
- Marayke Jonkers, medal-winning Paralympic swimmer and Queensland Young Achiever 2005
- Rebecca Creedy, ironwoman and Commonwealth Games swimmer
- Soo Wincci, Miss World Malaysia 2008, international recording artist, actress, composer, host and entrepreneur
- Taniela B. Wakolo, General Authority of the Church of Jesus Christ of Latter-day Saints

=== Administration ===
==== Chancellors ====
Order	Chancellor	Years	Notes
1	The Hon Tony Fitzgerald AC KC	1994–1998	
2	Ian Kennedy AM	1998–2007	
3	John Dobson OAM	2007–1 April 2017	
4	Air Chief Marshal Sir Angus Houston AK AFC	1 April 2017–present	

==== Vice-Chancellors ====
Order	Vice-Chancellors	Years	Notes
1	Paul Thomas AM	1996–2010	
2	Greg Hill AO	2011–2020	
3	Helen Bartlett	2020–present	

=== Faculty ===
- Brendan Burkett OAM, a medal-winning Paralympic swimming athlete and academic
- Chris Sidoti, former member of the Australian Law Reform Commission
- Gary Crew, an award-winning author of children's fiction
- Karen Brooks, author, columnist, social commentator and academic

== See also ==
- List of universities in Australia
