= Sunshine Coast University Hospital =

- Queensland Health
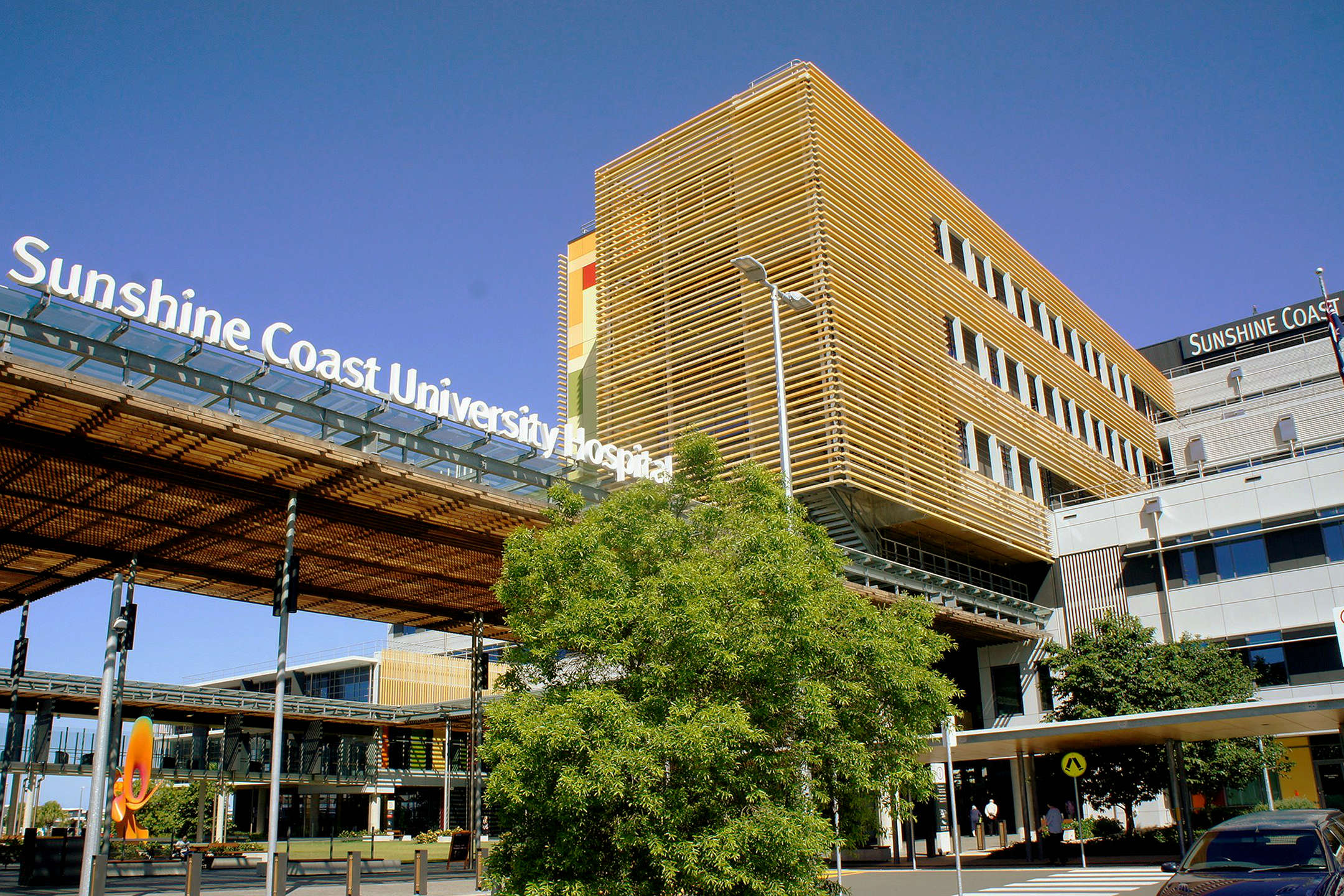

Geography
- Location: 6 Doherty Street, Birtinya, Queensland, Australia
- Coordinates: 26.7441°S 153.1146°E

Organisation
- Care system: Public Medicare (AU)
- Type: Teaching
- Affiliated university: University of the Sunshine Coast and Griffith University, School of Medicine

Services
- Emergency department: Yes
- Beds: 728

Helipads
- Helipad: (ICAO: YXHS)
Number	Length		Surface
Number	ft	m	Surface
1			aluminium

Links
- Website: Official website
- Lists: Hospitals in Australia

The Sunshine Coast University Hospital (SCUH) is a tertiary teaching hospital located in Birtinya, a suburb of Kawana Waters, Queensland. It is operated by the Sunshine Coast Hospital and Health Service (SCHHS), part of the Queensland Health network. The hospital has 728 beds, and has a catchment containing roughly 450,000 people on the Sunshine Coast and Gympie. It provides clinical placements to nursing and medical students from multiple institutions, including the University of the Sunshine Coast, Griffith University and TAFE Queensland (nursing).

The Sunshine Coast University Hospital is located close to the Sunshine Coast University Private Hospital operated by Ramsay Health Care and the Sunshine Coast Health Institute.

== History ==
In July 2012, Minister for Health Lawrence Springborg from the Newman Ministry of the Queensland Government appointed the Exemplar Health consortium comprising Lendlease, Capella Capital, Siemens and Spotless to deliver the Sunshine Coast University Hospital (SCUH) as a public–private partnership. Construction began in October 2012. It opened in March 2017 with 450 beds, and was expanded to 728 by June 2025. It was the first teaching hospital to open in Australia for 20 years at a cost of $1.8 billion. The hospital was designed by Sunshine Coast Architects, a partnership between Architectus Brisbane, Stantec Architecture and HDR Rice Daubney of Sydney. Engineering design services were provided by Aurecon.

== Services ==
Services provided by the Sunshine Coast University Hospital include:

- Aboriginal and Torres Strait Islander health services
- Aged care services
- Blood and blood vessel disorder services
- Bone, joint, muscle and soft tissue disease services
- Brain and nerve services
- Breathing and lung services
- Cancer services
- Children services
- Dental services
- Digestive and endocrine system (gut, pancreas, liver, gallbladder and bile duct) services
- Emergency care services
- General medicine services
- General surgery services
- Heart services
- Kidney services
- Medical investigation services
- Mental health and addiction services
- Palliative care services
- Plastic and reconstructive services
- Sexual health and HIV services
- Skin disease and disorder services
- Support services
- Urinary tract disorder services
- Women and baby services

The Sunshine Coast University Hospital is also a Regional Trauma Service within the Queensland Health trauma system.

Pathology Queensland also operates a 24/7 laboratory and phlebotomy service 5 days a week from the Sunshine Coast University Hospital and offers specialist services, including:

- Paediatrics
- Dexamethasone
- Synacthen

== Facilities ==
The Sushine Coast University Hospital mostly operates from the main hospital building, featuring 6 functional floors with further rooftop plants and a helicopter landing pad.

Level G contains the main entrance, emergency department, fast track area, paediatric emergency department, imaging services, medical assessment and planning unit, transit unit, spiritual care centre, liaison and support offices and the main reception. It also houses a large retail and food court, security offices and the surgical decisions unit.

Level 1 contains multiple ambulatory care clinics, allied health, the pharmacy, health information management and the acute renal clinic, as well as a connection to the P1 car park.

Level 2 contains 16 operating room suites, an interventional procedural suite, a day surgery unit, dentistry clinics, biomedical technology services, the clinical investigations unit and the post-anaesthesia care unit.

Level 3 primarily contains staff facilities, being the volunteers' offices, sterilising support services, the sleep assessment unit and various other amenities.

Level 4 contains the women's and families' clinic, neonatal care unit, birthing services, maternity inpatient unit, and the child and adolescent inpatient unit.

Level 5 contains the rehabilitation unit and the Pathology Queensland laboratory.

Levels 6 and 7 are rooftop areas containing plant machinery and the helipad, respectively.

Levels 3, 4 and 5 additionally provide access to inpatient units, including the cardiac, respiratory, infectious diseases, general/medical/surgical, orthopaedics/vascular and stroke/delirium/neurology wards.

To the east of the main hospital building lies the Adem Crosby Centre, providing care across 3 levels, including radiation oncology and chemotherapy, as well as housing the Intensive Care Unit and Coronary Care Unit.

The Mental Health Unit is located to the south-west of the main hospital building and provides inpatient mental health care across 4 wards:

- Adolescent Unit (Rosella)
- Adult Unit (Kamala)
- Mental Health ICU (Melaleuca)
- Older Persons Unit (Waratah)

The Kamala Mental Health Adult Inpatient Unit (MHAIU) is a 20-bed unit that provides 24-hour mental health care and crisis intervention to persons over the age of 18.

Within the Emergency Department, the hospital contains 5 resuscitation bays, one being paediatric, and one isolation room along with 24 acute beds for emergent but non life-threatening injuries and 15 short stay beds for patients expected to be discharged within 1–24 hours. The front of house pod also contains 15 treatment bays, a mental health assessment bay, an ophthalmology bay, and a procedure room.

The Cardiac Care Unit located inside the Adem Crosby Centre is a 10 bed facility providing care for adult cardiology patients with acute illness and STEMI patients. All 10 beds are fitted with telemetry equipment in addition to regular monitoring equipment.

== Controversies ==
In 2021, the Federal Circuit Court of Australia ruled the Sunshine Coast Hospital and Health Service were in contravention of the Disability Discrimination Act 1992, and ordered 17 breaches to be rectified, including:

- Replacing of all directory signs
- Use of Braille signs
- Refinishing polished floors
- Reducing reflective services

Prior to the rectification works, visually impaired persons regularly reported becoming lost or disoriented within the hospital. In one case, this led to a man being unable to locate a lavatory, resulting in a case of urinary incontinence.

In 2022, a man died after a routine sclerotherapy performed at the Sunshine Coast University Hospital. The Deputy State Coroner scheduled an inquest into the man's death for December 2025, to identify the circumstances in which the man died and if his care was appropriate.

In February 2022, a right to information request revealed a "toxic culture" within the Sunshine Coast Hospital and Health Service, with two whisteblowers suspended, allegations of bullying and intimidation, and a "punishing, chaotic and dysfunctional" work environment. In addition, during the reign of Director-General Dr John Wakefield, 24 senior staff members resigned shortly before the Sunshine Coast University Hospital's CEO also resigned. It was also noted that the Sunshine Coast University Hospital and Nambour General Hospital were the two worst-rated hospitals statewide for elective surgery wait times, with only 1 in 3 patients seen within recommended clinical timeframes.

== Statistics ==
From April to June 2025, the Sunshine Coast University Hospital provided:

- 26,316 episodes of care (planned and unplanned)
- 119,122 outpatient episodes of care
- 14,279 same-day admissions (Note: Same day admissions occur where the patient was admitted to hospital for a single day (or part of a day), and did not remain in hospital overnight.)
- 10,637 ED admissions
- 11,587 overnight admissions

As of June 2025, the Sunshine Coast University Hospital employs:

- 1,087 doctors (891.58 full-time equivalent)
- 2.975 nurses and midwives (2,174.25 full-time equivalent)
- 802 allied health practitioners (656.82 full-time equivalent)
