= Stuart Barnes (poet) =

Australian poet

- Born: Hobart, Tasmania, Australia
- Education: Monash University
- Notable work: Glasshouses, Like to the Lark
- Awards: 2023 Wesley Michel Wright Prize in Poetry, 2021/22 Gwen Harwood Poetry Prize; 2015 Arts Queensland Thomas Shapcott Poetry Prize
- Website: www.stuartabarnes.com

Stuart Barnes (born 1977) is an Australian poet.

== Biography ==
Barnes was born in Hobart, Tasmania, and educated at Monash University, Victoria. His first book, Glasshouses, was awarded the 2015 Arts Queensland Thomas Shapcott Poetry Prize. The judges of the Anne Elder Award, for which the collection was commended, wrote: "Barnes is compelling, dramatic and imaginative. ... [He] is a major poet in the making; watch this space!" In The Sydney Morning Herald, Jane Sullivan included Glasshouses in 'Books for the year: The treats in store from Australia and overseas in 2016'. The collection has been warmly received by critics: in The West Australian, William Yeoman described it as "playful, subtle, moving, witty and outrageous—a major achievement"; in The Australian, Geoff Page noted its "impressive balancing act between a love of precursors and the strategies of the avant-garde".

In his conference paper 'Sonnets and Para-Sonnets', Stephen Guy-Bray, Professor, Department of English, University of British Columbia, wrote:

Barnes's poems are often created out of other poems, whether literally—as in the case of the five centos he includes [in Glasshouses]—or more metaphorically, as in his use of sonnet form and of quotations. In Glasshouses the sonnet is only one form among many that Barnes plays with, just as the lines of other people’s poetry that make up all of the centos are only one kind of quotation among the many others—conversation, texts, brand names, place names—that fill the book. In blurring the lines between sexual and poetic activity, Barnes sets up a consolation for the lack of sexual success that [his sonnet '10:15 Saturday Night'] recounts, a consolation that is arguably implicit in almost all the sonnet sequences ever written, and certainly in the most famous ones. By the end of the poem the poet Barnes most resembles is perhaps not Shakespeare or any of the other sonneteers of the sixteenth century but rather (to me, at least) Hart Crane.

Barnes's second book, Like to the Lark (Upswell Publishing, 2023), includes the Gwen Harwood Poetry Prize-winning 'Sestina after B. Carlisle', the Montreal International Poetry Prize-shortlisted 'Off-world Ghazal' and the Pushcart Prize-nominated 'Cerberus Watches Eros' (first published as 'Triolet: Cerberus and Eros'). In The Sydney Morning Herald, Jane Sullivan included Like to the Lark in 'What are you going to read in 2023? Here are some standout titles'. Like to the Lark won the 2023 Wesley Michel Wright Prize in Poetry. The Prize Selection committee praised its 'extraordinary poems, which draw their forms from across the planet, mix deep history and pop music, personal extremity and sophisticated humour, in such striking and memorable ways that each rereading proves even more rewarding than the last.'

Barnes's poetry has been widely published in anthologies and journals, including in The Anthology of Australian Prose Poetry, Cordite Poetry Review, The Language in My Tongue: An Anthology of Australian and New Zealand Poetry, The Montreal International Poetry Prize Anthology 2020, The Moth, Overland, Poetry, Poetry Wales and Southerly. Other writing, as selected by Nick Earls, has been published to goa, Brisbane’s broadcast roadside digital billboard network, as part of Queensland Writers Centre's #8WordStory initiative.

Barnes has been a judge for the 2014 ACT Writing and Publishing Awards: Poetry Book Category, the 2017 Arts Queensland Val Vallis Award, the 2021 Red Room Poetry Fellowship and the 2022 Arts Queensland Thomas Shapcott Poetry Prize. From 2017–2019 he was a program adviser for Queensland Poetry Festival. From 2014 to 2015 he was poetry editor of Verity La, and from 2013 to 2017 he was poetry editor of Tincture Journal. In 2018 he served on the advisory board of Bent Window Books and guest-edited, with Quinn Eades, Cordite Poetry Review Issue 88: TRANSQUEER. In 2020 he guest-edited, with Charmaine Papertalk Green, Rabbit: a journal for nonfiction poetry Issue 32: FORM. In 2021 he guest-edited, with Claire Gaskin, Australian Poetry Journal 11.1 'local, attention'.

== Bibliography ==
=== Poetry collections ===
- Like to the Lark (Upswell Publishing, 2023, ISBN 978-0-6455-3698-0).
- Glasshouses (University of Queensland Press, 2016, ISBN 978-0-7022-5413-0).

=== Anthologies (as contributor) ===
- Best of Australian Poems 2022. Eds Jeanine Leane, Judith Beveridge. (Australian Poetry, 2022).
- Admissions: Voices within Mental Health. Eds David Stavanger, Radhiah Chowdhury, Mohammad Awad. (Upswell Publishing, 2022).
- Alcatraz. Eds Cassandra Atherton and Paul Hetherington. (Gazebo Books, 2022).
- The Language in My Tongue: An Anthology of Australian and New Zealand Poetry. Eds Cassandra Atherton and Paul Hetherington. (MadHat Press, 2022).
- Travel: an anthology of microlit. Ed. Cassandra Atherton. (Spineless Wonders, 2022).
- Resilience: 2021 ACU Prize for Poetry Anthology. Eds Robert H. F. Carver and Margot Hillel. (Australian Catholic University, 2021).
- Memory Book: Portraits of Older Australians in Poetry and Watercolours. Eds Jessica L Wilkinson and Cassandra Atherton. (Hunter Publishers, 2021).
- The Anthology of Australian Prose Poetry. Eds Cassandra Atherton and Paul Hetherington. (Melbourne University Press, 2020).
- Pulped Fiction: an anthology of microlit. Ed. Cassandra Atherton. (Spineless Wonders, 2021).
- The Montreal International Poetry Prize Anthology 2020. Eds Eli MacLaren et al. (Vehicule Press).
- Scars: an anthology of microlit. Ed. Cassandra Atherton. (Spineless Wonders, 2020).
- Lovejets: Queer Male Poets on 200 Years of Walt Whitman. Ed. Raymond Luczak. (Squares & Rebels, 2019).
- Going Postal: More than 'Yes' or 'No'. Eds Quinn Eades and Son Vivienne. (Brow Books, 2018).
- Shaping the Fractured Self: poetry of chronic illness and pain. Ed. Heather Taylor Johnson. (UWA Publishing, 2017).
- States of Poetry Queensland - Series One. Ed. Felicity Plunkett. (Australian Book Review, 2016).
- fourW: new writing. Ed. David Gilbey. (fourW press, 2012, 2013, 2014).
- Time with the sky : Newcastle Poetry Prize Anthology 2010. Eds Jill Jones and Anthony Lawrence. (Hunter Writers' Centre, 2010).
- The Night Road : Newcastle Poetry Prize Anthology 2009. Eds Jill Jones and Philip Salom. (Hunter Writers' Centre, 2009).

== Awards and nominations ==
- ALS Gold Medal, 2024, shortlisted for Like to the Lark
- Wesley Michel Wright Prize, 2023, winner for Like to the Lark
- Arts Queensland Val Vallis Award, 2023, shortlisted for 'Starting and Finishing with a Line from Lisel Mueller's Cicadas'
- Gwen Harwood Poetry Prize, 2021/22, winner for 'Sestina after B. Carlisle'
- NWF Joanne Burns Microlit Award, 2022, finalist for 'travel ban'
- ACU Prize for Poetry, 2021, shortlisted for 'Sestina: Pain'
- NWF Joanne Burns Microlit Award, 2021, finalist for 'Little Gilt'
- Pushcart Prize, 2020, nominated for 'Triolet: Cerberus and Eros'.
- Montreal International Poetry Prize, 2020, shortlisted for 'Off-World Ghazal'.
- NWF Joanne Burns Microlit Award, 2019, finalist for 'Old Habits Die Hard'
- Venie Holmgren Environmental Poetry Prize, 2017, highly commended for 'Black Swan Polyptych'.
- Nillumbik Ekphrasis Poetry Award, 2017, shortlisted for 'the nomenclature of eggs'.
- Association for the Study of Australian Literature Mary Gilmore Prize, 2017, shortlisted for Glasshouses.
- Fellowship of Australian Writers Anne Elder Award, 2016, commended for Glasshouses.
- Arts Queensland Thomas Shapcott Poetry Prize, 2015, winner for Glasshouses.
- Arts Queensland Thomas Shapcott Poetry Prize, 2014, runner-up for Blacking Out and other poems.
- Newcastle Poetry Prize, 2010, shortlisted for 'Caravaggio: A Secret History in Sonnets'.
- Newcastle Poetry Prize, 2009, shortlisted for 'Solomon'.
