= Andrew Ford (composer) =

English/Australian composer

Andrew Ford OAM (born 1957) is an English-born Australian composer, writer, and radio presenter, known for The Music Show on ABC Radio National.

== Early life and education ==
Andrew Ford was born in 1957 in Liverpool, UK.

He attended St Olave's Grammar School in Orpington, Kent, then studied at Lancaster University with Edward Cowie and John Buller. As a student, a meeting with Sir Michael Tippett had a profound influence on him, when he told him "to forget about musical systems and trust his instincts".

== Career ==
Ford was Fellow in Music at Bradford University from 1978 to 1982.

After moving to Australia, he lectured at the School of Creative Arts at the University of Wollongong, NSW, from 1983 to 1995, and during this time earned a doctorate for his thesis on musical word setting from Elvis Costello to Elliott Carter.

Ford was composer-in-residence with the Australian Chamber Orchestra (1992–94), held the Peggy Glanville-Hicks Composer Fellowship from 1998 to 2000 and was awarded a two-year fellowship by the Music Board of the Australia Council for the Arts for 2005 to 2006. He was appointed composer-in-residence at the Australian National Academy of Music in 2009.

=== Other activities ===
He has written widely on music and published or co-written eleven books. For the Australian Broadcasting Corporation, he wrote, presented and co-produced the radio series Illegal Harmonies, Dots on the Landscape, Music and Fashion, Earth Dances and Three Front Doors a Paddock (with painter Ben Quilty)

Since 1995 he has presented The Music Show on ABC Radio National.

== Recognition and awards ==
- 1982: Yorkshire Arts Composers Award, joint winner (with Mark-Anthony Turnage) for Portraits
- 1998: Peggy Glanville-Hicks Composer Fellowship, a two-year fellowship during which he began work on The Waltz Book
- 1998: Pascall Prize for critical writing
- 1998: Sydney Spring Festival award, for Tattoo
- 2002: Jean Bogan Prize, for The Waltz Book
- 2004: Paul Lowin Song Cycle Prize, for Learning to Howl
- 2007: shortlisted, Prix Italia, for his radiophonic work Elegy in a Country Graveyard
- 2010: Green Room Award, for the music for the opera Rembrandt's Wife
- 2012: Albert H. Maggs Composition Award for his work Rauha
- 2013: shortlisted, Paul Lowin Prize, for Blitz and Willow Songs
- 2014: Poynter Fellow and visiting composer at Yale University
- 2015: visiting lecturer at the Shanghai Conservatory
- 2016: shortlisted, Paul Lowin Prize, for Last Words
- 2016: Order of Australia Medal
- 2018: H. C. Coombs Creative Arts Fellow at the Australian National University
- 2020: Sidney Myer Performing Arts Award, Facilitator's Prize (awarded 2021)

=== APRA / Art Music Awards ===
The APRA Awards are presented annually from 1982 by the Australasian Performing Right Association (APRA). They include the Art Music Awards (until 2009 Classical Music Awards) which are distributed by APRA and the Australian Music Centre (AMC). These awards include:

Year	Nominee / work	Award	Result
2004	Learning to Howl – Ford	Best Composition by an Australian Composer	Won
2005	Tales of the Supernatural – Ford – Australian String Quartet, Jane Edwards	Vocal or Choral Work of the Year	Won
2008	Ford	Outstanding Contribution by an Individual	Nominated
2009	Learning to Howl – Ford – Arcko Symphonic Project	Best Performance of an Australian Composition	Nominated
2011	A Dream of Drowning – Ford – West Australian Symphony Orchestra	Work of the Year – Orchestral	Nominated
2013	Blitz – Ford – Tasmanian Symphony Orchestra	Work of the Year – Orchestral	Nominated
2014	Last Words – Ford – Jane Sheldon and the Seraphim Trio	Work of the Year – Vocal/Choral	Won
2014	String Quartet No. 5 – Ford – Australian String Quartet	Work of the Year – Instrumental	Nominated

== Selected works ==
=== Stage works ===
- Poe, opera (1983, premiered 1985, Sydney Opera House)
- Whispers for tenor and chamber orchestra (1990)
- Casanova Confined for baritone and backing track (1995)
- Night and Dreams: The Death of Sigmund Freud for tenor and backing track (1999)
- Rembrandt's Wife (libretto by Sue Smith), opera (2007–2009)
- Peter Pan, children's opera (2017), for Gondwana Choirs

=== Orchestral ===
- Concerto for Orchestra (1980)
- The Big Parade (1986)
- Manhattan Epiphanies for string orchestra (1999)
- The Furry Dance (1999)
- Scenes from Bruegel for chamber orchestra (2006)
- Headlong (2006), for 75th birthday of Sydney Symphony Orchestra
- Symphony (2008)
- Bright Shiners for string orchestra (2009)
- Blitz for orchestra, (optional) chorus and pre-recorded voices (2011)
- Big Bang for orchestra (2019)
- The Meaning of Trees for orchestra (2020), for Australian Youth Orchestra, premiered 2022
- The Carnival of the Insects for string orchestra and narrator (2023), poems by John Kinsella

=== Concertos ===
- Piano Concerto: Imaginings (1991)
- The Great Memory for cello and orchestra (1994)
- The Unquiet Grave for viola and chamber orchestra (1997–1998)
- Raga for electric guitar and orchestra (2015–2016), for Zane Banks

=== Vocal and choral ===
- A Martian Sends a Postcard Home for tenor, horn and piano (1986), words by Craig Raine
- Wassails and Lullabies for SATB choir and percussion (1989), recorded by ABC Classics
- Harbour for tenor and string orchestra (1992)
- The Past for counter-tenor, flute and string orchestra (with ad lib didgeridoo) (1997), a setting of Oodgeroo Noonuccal's poem 'The Past' and excerpts from James Cook's ship's log
- Learning to Howl for soprano, clarinet/sax, harp and percussion (2001)
- Tales of the Supernatural for folk singer and string quartet (2002)
- An die Musik for SATB choir (2005)
- Elegy in a Country Graveyard for SATB choir, brass or concert band (flexible instrumentation) and pre-recorded voices and instruments (2007)
- Domestic Advice for soprano and piano (2007)
- A Singing Quilt for SATB choir, percussion ensemble and pre-recorded voices (2008)
- Willow Songs: six poems of Anne Stevenson for soprano, mezzo-soprano and mixed ensemble (2009)
- Waiting for the Barbarians for large chorus (2011), based on the poem by Constantine P. Cavafy
- Last Words, song cycle for piano trio and soprano (2013 premiered by Anna Goldsworthy, Seraphim Trio, Jane Sheldon)
- The Drowners for baritone and chamber orchestra (2015)
- Missa brevis for SATB choir and organ (2015)
- Comeclose and Sleepnow for singer and jazz ensemble (2016), to words by Adrian Henri, Brian Patten and Roger McGough
- No One Could Relax around Jezebel for soprano and percussion (2017) to words by Anne Carson for Jane Sheldon and Claire Edwardes
- Nature for mezzo-soprano and ensemble (2019), to words by Jen Hadfield, R.S. Thomas, Robert Adamson, Tomas Tranströmer, Maria Takolander, Edward Thomas and W.B. Yeats
- The Blessing for mezzo-soprano and oboe (2021), libretto by J.M. Coetzee based on a scene from his novel Elizabeth Costello
- Red Dirt Hymns for voices and instruments (2020–24), lyrics by Jordie Albiston, David McCooey, John Kinsella, Ellen van Neerven, Judith Bishop, Judith Beveridge, Sarah Holland-Batt, Stephen Edgar, Kate Fagan, Merlinda Bobis, Mark Wakely, Felicity Plunkett, Philip Harvey, Erik Jensen, Jill Jones, Maria Takolander, Melanie Horsnell, Martha Marlow, Alison Flett and Lisa Brockwell
- I Sing the Birth for children's choir and electric guitar (2024)
- Six Medieval Women for women's choir, actor, bells and tam-tams (2025) to words by Hildegard of Bingen, Trota of Salerno, Anna of Rome, The Wife of Bath (Chaucer), Margery Kempe and Julian of Norwich

=== Ensemble ===
- Chamber Concerto No 3: In Constant Flight for solo violin and ensemble (1988)
- Ringing the Changes for piccolo, bass clarinet and piano (1990)
- Pastoral for string octet (1991)
- Tattoo for 12 timpani (6 players) and 4 pianos (1998)
- Icarus Drowning (1998)
- Chamber Concerto No. 4 (2002)
- Sad Jigs for string quintet (2005)
- A Reel, a Fling and a Ghostly Galliard (String Quartet No 2) (2006)
- Oma kodu for clarinet and string quartet (2006)
- Nine Fantasies about Brahms for piano trio (2009)
- On Winter's Traces for piccolo, bass clarinet, piano and string quartet (2009) for the 30th anniversary of the Australia Ensemble
- The Rising (2010) for the Black Dyke Band
- The Scattering of Light for piano quartet (2010) commissioned to mark the centenary of the University of Queensland
- String Quartet No 3 (2012) for the Brodsky Quartet
- String Quartet No 4 (2012) for The Noise
- String Quartet No 5 (2013) for the Australian String Quartet
- Uproar for 11 trombones and four bass drums (2013)
- Common Ground for two string quartets (2014)
- Contradance for 11 players (2015)
- String Quartet No 6 (2014–17) for the Flinders Quartet
- Scenes from Streeton (2019) for Arcadia Winds
- String Quartet No 7: Eden Ablaze (2020) for the Brodsky Quartet and William Barton
- Machnamh: ruminations on a tune by Seán Ó Riada (2022) for the Brodsky Quartet and William Barton

=== Instrumental ===
- Like Icarus ascending for solo violin (1984)
- Swansong for solo viola (1987)
- Spinning for solo alto flute (1988)
- The Very End of Harvest for viola and piano (2000)
- The Waltz Book (60 one-minute waltzes for solo piano, 2002; commissioned by Ian Munro)
- ...fear no more ... (for the victims of Bali bombing 2002) for solo piano, written in 2003 for Indonesian pianist Ananda Sukarlan
- War and Peace for violin and percussion (2004)
- Chorales from an Ox Life for viola and double bass (2007)
- Folly for solo piano (2007)
- You Must Sleep, but I Must Dance for viola and percussion (2010)
- On Reflection for two pianos (2012)
- Once upon a time there were two brothers...for flute and voice (2013)
- Hook for solo vibraphone (2018)
- In My Solitude for solo viola (2020)
- Confused Alarms for horn and piano (2021)
- Irish Tunes for piano (2024)
- Deep Riffs for electric guitar and looping pedal (2024)

=== Radiophonic ===
- Deirdre of the Sorrows (1989)
- Elegy in a Country Graveyard (2007)
- Untuning the Sky (2013)

=== Books ===
- Composer to Composer: Conversations about Contemporary Music (paperback) Sydney: Allen & Unwin 1993, ISBN 1-86373-443-0, (hardback) London: Quartet 1993, ISBN 0-7043-7061-1, 2nd edition (paperback) Sydney: Hale & Iremonger 1997, ISBN 0-86806-631-1)
- Illegal Harmonies: Music in the 20th Century Hale & Iremonger 1997, ISBN 0-86806-635-4; 2nd ed. Sydney: ABC Books 2002, ISBN 0-7333-1130-X, expanded 3rd ed. Melbourne: Black Inc., ISBN 978-1-86395-528-7)
- Undue Noise: Words about Music (paperback). ABC Books. 2002. ISBN 0-7333-1057-5.
- Buzacott, Martin; with Andrew Ford (2005). Speaking in Tongues: The Songs of Van Morrison (paperback). ABC Books. ISBN 0-7333-1297-7.
- In Defence of Classical Music (hardback). ABC Books. 2005. ISBN 0-7333-1594-1.
- The Sound of Pictures: Listening to the Movies from Hitchcock to High Fidelity (paperback). Melbourne: Black Inc. 2010. ISBN 978-1-86395-510-2.
- Try Whistling This: Writings about Music (paperback). Melbourne: Black Inc. 2012. ISBN 978-1-86395-571-3.
- Earth Dances: Music in Search of the Primitive (paperback). Melbourne: Black Inc. 2015. ISBN 978-1-86395-712-0.
- The Memory of Music (paperback). Melbourne: Black Inc. 2017. ISBN 978-1-86395-949-0.
- with Anni Heino (2019). The Song Remains the Same: 800 Years of Love Songs, Laments and Lullabies (paperback). Melbourne: La Trobe University Press. ISBN 978-1-76064-011-8.
- The Shortest History of Music (paperback). Melbourne: Black Inc. 2024. ISBN 978-1-76064-408-6. (hardback) London: Old Street Publishing 2024. ISBN 978-1-913083-65-6. (paperback) New Delhi: Picador India 2025 ISBN 978-93-6113-316-9.
