= List of poetry awards =

== Major international awards ==
- Golden Wreath of Struga Poetry Evenings
- Bridges of Struga (for a debuting author at Struga Poetry Evenings)
- Griffin Poetry Prize (The international prize)
- International Hippocrates Prize for Poetry and Medicine (Open First Prize=£5000)
- Montreal International Poetry Prize ($20,000 prize for one poem)
- National Poetry Competition (International, First Prize=£5000)
- Arvon International Poetry Prize (biennial)
- Nobel Prize in Literature (Not exclusively for poetry)
- Poetic Republic Poetry Prize (Anonymous peer review poetry competition)
- Poetry London Prize (First Prize=£5000)
- Rhysling Award (For science-fiction poetry)
- Pushcart Prize ("Best of the Small Presses")
- Charles Causley Trust International Poetry Competition (First Prize=£2000)
- Derek Walcott Prize for Poetry
- The Poetry.com Contest (First Prize=$1000)
- Maya Poetry Book Awards (First prize £5,000)

== Asia ==
- SAARC Literary Award

=== India ===
- Saraswati Samman
- Sahitya Akademi Award given by Sahitya Akademi, India's National Academy of Letters
- Jnanpith Award
- Ananda Purashkar
- Kalidas Samman
- Pampa Award
- Rabindra Puraskar
- Karnataka Sahitya Akademi Award for Poetry
- Jibanananda Das Award
- All India Poetry Prize

=== Korea ===
- Kim Su-yông Contemporary Poetry Award
- Sowol Poetry Prize

=== Malaysia ===
- Hadiah Sastera Perdana Malaysia
- Hadiah Sastera Kumpulan Utusan
- Hadiah Sastera Majlis Sastera Asia Tenggara (Hadiah MASTERA)

=== Greater Middle East ===
- Foundation of Abdulaziz Saud Al-Babtain's Prize for Poetic Creativity

== Africa ==
- Brunel University African Poetry Prize
- Uganda Poetry Society- Dr. Ivan Edwards Poetry Award

== Europe ==
=== Austria ===
- Feldkircher Lyrikpreis
- Mondseer Lyrikpreis

=== Croatia ===
- Tin Ujević Award for contributions to Croatian poetry

=== Germany ===
- Ernst-Meister-Preis für Lyrik
- Hölty Prize
- Horst Bienek Prize for Poetry
- Leonce-und-Lena-Preis
- Peter-Huchel-Preis
- Wilhelm Busch Prize for satirical and humorous poetry

=== Ireland ===
- Irish Times Poetry Now Award
- Patrick Kavanagh Poetry Award

=== Italy ===
- Bancarella Prize
- Merano Poetry Prize
- Mondello Prize
- Premio Camaiore
- Premio Campiello
- Premio Hemingway
- Premio Viareggio
- Strega Prize

=== Netherlands ===
- Awater Poëzieprijs
- C. Buddingh'-prijs
- J.C. Bloem-poëzieprijs
- Jan Campert Prize
- Jo Peters Poëzieprijs
- VSB Poetry Prize

=== Slovenia ===
- Jenko Award
- KONS International Literary Award
- Veronika Award
- Vilenica Prize

=== Spanish (language) ===
- National Poetry Award (Spain)
- Premio Adonais
- Premio Cervantes
- Premio Loewe (Loewe Foundation International Poetry Prize)
- Premio Nacional de la Crítica

=== United Kingdom ===
- Alice Hunt Bartlett Prize
- Brunel University African Poetry Prize
- Chancellor's Gold Medal
- Christopher Tower Poetry Prizes
- Cholmondeley Award
- Costa Poetry Award, formerly the Whitbread Poetry award
- Edwin Morgan Poetry Award
- E. H. P. Barnard Poetry Prize
- Eric Gregory Award
- Forward Prize
- Gaisford Prize
- Geoffrey Dearmer Award
- Geoffrey Faber Memorial Prize
- Hippocrates Prize for Poetry and Medicine (Open and NHS-related awards)
- Manchester Poetry Prize
- Michael Marks Poetry Awards
- National Poetry Competition
- Newdigate Prize
- Oxford Poetry
- Poetry Book Awards
- Popescu Prize
- Porson Prize
- Queen's Gold Medal for Poetry
- Sarah Maguire Prize
- T. S. Eliot Prize
- Welsh Poetry Competition

== North America ==
=== Canada ===
- Aqua Books Lansdowne Prize for Poetry
- Archibald Lampman Award
- Atlantic Poetry Prize
- Dorothy Livesay Poetry Prize
- Gerald Lampert Award – for the best volume of poetry by a new author
- Griffin Poetry Prize – generous award for one Canadian and one foreign poet
- Pat Lowther Award – for the best volume of poetry written by a woman
- Prix Alain-Grandbois

==== Governor General's Awards ====
===== English language =====
- Governor General's Award for English language poetry
- Governor General's Award for English language poetry or drama

===== French language =====
- Governor General's Award for French language poetry
- Governor General's Award for French language poetry or drama

=== United States ===
- Agha Shahid Ali Poetry Prize – awarded annually in memory of this poet, sponsored by the University of Utah Department of English and the University of Utah Press
- Agnes Lynch Starrett Poetry Prize – for a first book of poetry
- Aiken Taylor Award for Modern American Poetry – annual prize, administered by the Sewanee Review and the University of the South, awarded to a writer who has had a substantial and distinguished career
- Alice James Award
- Amy Lowell Poetry Travelling Scholarship – given annually to a U.S.-born poet to spend one year outside North America in a country the recipient feels will most advance his or her work
- Autumn House Press – poetry and fiction awards for full-length book manuscripts
- Backwaters Press – annual prize awarded to book length manuscript selected by guest judge
- Bernard F. Connors Prize for Poetry – awarded by the editors of Paris Review for the best poem published in the magazine over the course of the year
- The Best American Poetry series – maximum of 75 poems published each year in the anthology series
- The Best New Poets series – maximum of 50 poems published each year in the anthology series
- Bobbitt National Prize for Poetry – offered by the Library of Congress for the best book of poetry published by a living U.S. author during the preceding two years
- Bollingen Prize – $175,000 offered by the Beinecke Library at Yale University every two years to recognize the lifetime achievement of a living U.S. poet.
- Borestone Mountain Poetry Awards – former series of annual anthologies (1948–1977) of poems selected as the best from each year's English-language magazines
- Brittingham Prize in Poetry
- Broken Tribe Poetry AwardAward
- Chelsea Award for Poetry – given by Chelsea magazine
- Cider Press Review Book Award – given by the Cider Press Review
- Crab Orchard Series in Poetry Open Competition Awards offers $3,500 for the first prize and $2,000 for the second prize
- Donald Justice Poetry Prize – sponsored by the Iris N. Spencer Poetry Awards at the West Chester University Poetry Center
- Dwarf Stars Award – annual award presented by the Science Fiction Poetry Association to the author of the best horror, fantasy, or science fiction poem of ten lines or fewer published in the previous year.
- Donna J. Stone National Literary Awards – sponsored by the Matthew J. Pascal Foundation and American Mothers, Inc.
- Felix Pollak Prize in Poetry
- Georgia Poetry Prize – sponsored by University of Georgia Press
- Glascock Prize
- Howard Nemerov Sonnet Award
- Iowa Poetry Prize – sponsored by University of Iowa Press
- Isabella Gardner Poetry Award – sponsored by BOA Editions
- Jackson Poetry Prize - Honors an American poet of exceptional talent with an award of $100,000, sponsored by Poets & Writers
- Julie Suk Award – awarded for Best Poetry Book by a Literary Press, sponsored by Jacar Press
- Kate Tufts Discovery Award – $10,000 awarded to a first time poet
- Kingsley Tufts Poetry Award – $100,000 award for poet in mid career
- Lambda Literary Award - for works which celebrate or explore LGBT themes
- Lannan Literary Award for Poetry – comes with $150,000
- Letter Review Prize for Poetry - $1000 USD + Publication First Prize. All entries considered for publication.
- Los Angeles Times Book Prize in Poetry
- Maurice English Poetry Award – awarded for a volume of poetry published when a poet is more than 50 years old
- National Book Award for Poetry
- National Book Critics Circle Award – given annually in poetry and in five other categories to promote the finest books and reviews published in English
- National Poetry Series – offered by the National Poetry Series through five participating publishers for a collection of poetry
- The New Criterion Poetry Prize – given by The New Criterion magazine
- O. B. Hardison Jr. Poetry Prize – awarded by the Folger Shakespeare Library to a U.S. poet who has published at least one book within the last five years, has made important contributions as a teacher, and is committed to furthering the understanding of poetry
- Patricia Cannon Willis Prize - offered by Yale's Beinecke Library every two years to honor an exceptional book that “represents the highest achievement in the field of American poetry”; carries an award of $25,000
- PEN Award for Poetry in Translation – honoring a poetry translation published in the preceding year
- PEN/Voelcker Award for Poetry – given biennially to an American poet whose distinguished and growing body of work to date represents a notable and accomplished presence in American literature
- Poet Laureate Consultant in Poetry to the Library of Congress
- Poets' Prize – awarded annually for the best book of verse published by an American in the previous calendar year
- Pulitzer Prize for Poetry
- Rattle Poetry Prize – $5000 prize for one poem given every year by Rattle
- Rhysling Award – two given out each year (one for a long poem, the other for a short poem), by the Science Fiction Poetry Association for the best science fiction, fantasy, or horror poems
- Richard Wilbur Award
- Ruth Lilly Poetry Prize – offered by the Poetry Foundation for a U.S. poet "whose accomplishments warrant extraordinary recognition"
- The Annual Prize for Best Poem or Prose – awarded by Poetries in English Magazine
- T. S. Eliot Prize for Poetry – publication prize awarded annually by Truman State University for the best unpublished collection in English. A distinct prize with the same name is awarded in the United Kingdom
- Willis Barnstone Translation Prize – annual prize for an outstanding translation of a poem from any language into English
- Witter Bynner Fellowships – administered by the Library of Congress, the fellowships are sponsored by the Witter Bynner Foundation for Poetry, an organization that provides grant support for poetry programs through nonprofit organizations. Fellows are chosen by the Poet Laureate, and are expected to participate in a poetry reading at the Library of Congress in October and to organize a poetry reading in their respective cities
- Witter Bynner Poetry Prize – established by the American Academy of Arts and Letters in 1980 to support the work of a young poet
- Yale Series of Younger Poets – offered by Yale University Press to a poet under the age of forty for a first volume of poetry

==== Awards given by the Academy of American Poets ====
- Wallace Stevens Award – $100,000 to recognize outstanding and proven mastery in the art of poetry
- Fellowship of the Academy of American Poets – $25,000 for distinguished poetic achievement
- Lenore Marshall Poetry Prize – $25,000 for the best book of poetry published in the United States in the previous year
- James Laughlin Award – $5,000 to recognize and support a poet's second book
- Walt Whitman Award – first-book publication, $5,000, and a one-month residency at the Vermont Studio Center for an American who has not yet published a book of poetry
- Raiziss/de Palchi Translation Awards – $10,000 book prize and $25,000 fellowship, awarded in alternating years to recognize outstanding translations into English of modern Italian poetry
- Harold Morton Landon Translation Award – $1,000 for a published translation of poetry from any language into English

==== Awards given by the Poetry Society of America ====
- Alice Fay Di Castagnola Award
- Anna Rabinowitz Prize
- Cecil Hemley Memorial Award
- Frost Medal
- Four Quartets Prize
- George Bogin Memorial Award
- Lucille Medwick Memorial Award
- Lyric Poetry Award
- Norma Farber First Book Award
- Robert H. Winner Memorial Award
- Shelley Memorial Award – since 1929, offered by the society to a poet living in the United States who is chosen on the basis of "genius and need"
- Student Poetry Award
- William Carlos Williams Award – offered by the society for the best book of poetry published by a small, non-profit, or university press
- Writer Magazine/Emily Dickinson Award

==== Awards given by the American Academy of Arts and Letters ====
- American Academy of Arts and Letters Gold Medals for Poetry – given every six years to honor the distinguished career of a poet; considered the highest honor of the American Academy of Arts and Letters
- Arthur Rense Prize – in 1998, the $20,000 award was established to honor "an exceptional poet" once every third year
- Michael Braude Award for Light Verse – $5,000 biennial award is given "for light verse written in English regardless of the country of origin of the writer"
- Witter Bynner Poetry Prize – awarded by the American Academy of Arts and Letters from 1980 to 1993

== South America ==
=== Chile ===
- Premio Nacional de Literatura de Chile

== Oceania ==
=== Australia ===
- Anne Elder Award
- Bruce Dawe National Poetry Prize
- Christopher Brennan Award
- C. J. Dennis Prize for Poetry
- Grace Leven Prize for Poetry
- Harri Jones Memorial Prize for Poetry
- Judith Wright Prize
- Judith Wright Calanthe Award
- Kenneth Slessor Prize for Poetry
- Mary Gilmore Prize
- The Roland Robinson Literary Award
- Thomas Shapcott Poetry Prize
- The Val Vallis Award
- The W. B. Yeats Poetry Prize for Australia

=== New Zealand ===
- Montana New Zealand Book Award for Poetry
- Arts Foundation of New Zealand Icon, Laureate and New Generation Awards
- New Zealand Poet Laureate

== See also ==
- List of years in poetry
- List of literary awards
- List of years in literature
