= Bronwyn Lea =

Australian poet, editor and literary critic

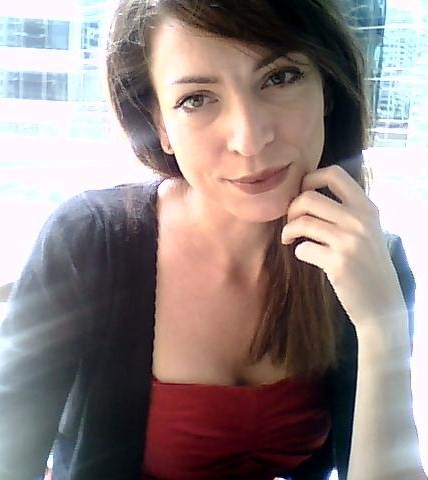
- Born: Tasmania, Australia
- Employer: The University of Queensland
- Known for: Poetry, Australian literary editing
- Website: bronwynlea.com

Bronwyn Lea is a contemporary Australian poet and editor.

== Bronwyn Lea ==
Bronwyn Lea is the author of the poetry collections Flight Animals (2001), The Wooden Cat and Other Poems (2003), The Other Way Out (2008), and The Deep North: A Selection of Poems (2013). Her work has been widely recognised as a distinctive contribution to contemporary Australian poetry.

== Biography ==
Lea was born in Tasmania and grew up in Queensland and Papua New Guinea. She later moved to San Diego, where she studied at California State University, before completing a PhD at the University of Queensland in 2005.

== Poetry ==
Lea’s poetry explores themes of desire, embodiment, displacement, and the relationship between personal experience and wider historical and cultural contexts. Her collections include Flight Animals (2001), The Wooden Cat and Other Poems (2003), The Other Way Out (2008), and The Deep North: A Selection of Poems (2013).

== Editorial and literary work ==
Lea has played a significant role in Australian poetry publishing and literary culture as an editor and curator. As poetry editor at University of Queensland Press (2003–2009), she commissioned and edited works by poets including David Malouf, John Tranter, John Kinsella, Anthony Lawrence, Jaya Savige, Sarah Holland-Batt, and Felicity Plunkett. During this period she also co-founded and served as series editor (with Martin Duwell) of The Best Australian Poetry (2003–2009), an annual anthology that became a major national platform for contemporary poetry.

Lea later served as inaugural editor of Australian Poetry Journal (2011–2013), and as poetry editor of Meanjin (2016–2024). She also established the Arts Queensland Thomas Shapcott Poetry Prize and the Val Vallis Award.

She served on the Literature Board of the Australia Council from 2005 to 2008, and has since chaired judging panels for major Australian literary awards, including the Prime Minister's Literary Awards and Queensland literary awards.

== Academic career ==
Lea is Professor of Australian Literature and Writing at the University of Queensland. She was Head of the School of Communication and Arts at UQ from 2019 to 2025, and is Deputy President of the Academic Board. She has also contributed to scholarship on contemporary poetry and publishing.

== Critical response ==
Lea’s poetry has been widely recognised as a distinctive and influential contribution to contemporary Australian poetry. Martin Duwell described her early work as “a new, entirely individual voice in Australian poetry.”

Her debut collection, Flight Animals, was widely noted for its assurance and control. Writing in Island, Judith Beveridge described it as “an extremely assured and accomplished volume” and “a superb debut” marked by “beautiful surety,” adding that Lea appeared “a poet burgeoning into mid-career.” In Quadrant, Alan Gould identified “equipoise” as its defining quality, praising its “intellectual and emotional finesse” and “the fine connections of a very singular sensibility.”

The Other Way Out consolidated this reception. Geoffrey Lehmann, writing in The Weekend Australian, described Lea as “the brightest light to emerge in Australian poetry since the start of this decade,” characterising her poetry as “intense, personal, intelligent and witty” and calling “Born Again” “a modern classic.” In The Canberra Times, Geoff Page wrote that the collection lived up to the “very high standard” of her debut, noting its “technical excellence” and poems “finely but unobtrusively tuned” that build to “highly memorable” conclusions. Writing in Australian Book Review, Lyn McCredden emphasised its “consistency of craft” and its movement between desire, transcendence, and philosophical reflection.

Judges for the Western Australian Premier’s Book Awards described The Other Way Out as “finely crafted and translucent poetry” marked by “technical mastery and grace,” calling Lea “a major talent.” Judges for the John Bray Poetry Prize praised the collection’s “breadth of poetic skills,” its balance of philosophical argument with “things of the world,” and described it as “an astute and original collection.”

Critics have also emphasised the scope of Lea’s lyric practice. Philip Neilsen described her as a “powerful contributor to Australian literature” and “one of the few poets who succeed in crafting the lyric to its full potential.” Ali Alizadeh described her voice as “remarkably versatile,” capable of articulating “almost any subject.”

Lea’s work has been read as extending contemporary lyric poetry beyond autobiography. Maria Takolander argued that her poetry is “striking and meaningful” because it acknowledges “a wider and worldly context: historical, geographical, biological, political,” and resists the “claustrophobic potential of autobiographical verse.”

Her international selection The Deep North further strengthened this reception. Paul Kane described Lea as a “phenomenologist of the heart,” emphasising the poems’ movement through suffering and desire toward “ordinary grace.” John Kinsella wrote that what “excites” him about Lea’s poetry is its “control and impact,” its “investigation and questioning,” and its “gap between cause and effect.” He argued that the poems build “steadily, surely, and without hyperbole” toward “devastating insight into the workings of the human psyche, or the nature of poetry itself,” and described Lea’s voice as one that “dwells in the realm of paradox.” He also praised the poems’ “poise,” “unerring eye,” and attention to local details set within “wider social, geographical, cultural, historical and spiritual contexts.” Christian Bök described the work’s “elegiac courage” and the force of her lyric voice.

Lea’s standing has also been recognised in reference works: the 2013 edition of The Princeton Encyclopedia of Poetry and Poetics identified her as a “future shaper” of Australian poetry.

== Published works ==
Poetry

- The Deep North: A Selection of Poems (George Braziller, 2013)
- The Other Way Out. (Giramondo Publishing, 2008)
- The Wooden Cat and Other Poems. (Picaro P, 2003)
- Flight Animals. (University of Queensland Press, 2001) ISBN 0-7022-3242-4

Edited Works

- The Best Australian Poetry series, founding series editor with Martin Duwell (University of Queensland Press, 2003–2009)
- Australian Poetry Journal, inaugural editor (Australian Poetry, 2011–2013)
- Meanjin, poetry editor (2016–2024)

== Awards ==
Select book prizes

- John Bray Poetry Award Adelaide Festival Awards for Literature, 2010, winner for The Other Way Out
- C. J. Dennis Prize for Poetry, 2010, shortlisted for The Other Way Out
- Judith Wright Calanthe Award for Poetry, 2008, shortlisted for The Other Way Out
- Western Australian Premier's Book Awards for Poetry, 2008, winner for The Other Way Out
- The Vincent Buckley Poetry Prize, 2006, University of Melbourne
- Wesley Michel Wright Prize for Poetry, 2001—winner for Flight Animals
- Fellowship of Australian Writers Anne Elder Award, 2002—winner for Flight Animals
- John Bray Poetry Award ] Adelaide Festival Awards for Literature, 2002—shortlisted for Flight Animals
- Colin Roderick Award, 2002—special mention for Flight Animals
- Judith Wright Calanthe Award for Poetry, 2002—shortlisted for Flight Animals
- Kenneth Slessor Prize for Poetry, 2002—shortlisted for Flight Animals

Select Fellowships

- Rockefeller Foundation Bellagio Creative Arts Fellowship (2014)
- MacDowell Colony Writers’ Fellowship (2015)
- Yaddo Artists’ Colony Fellowship (2002)
- Asialink Literature Fellowship (2003)
