= Judith Wright Calanthe Award =

Australian poetry award

The Arts Queensland Judith Wright Calanthe Award is awarded annually as part of the Queensland Premier's Literary Awards for a book of collected poems or for a single poem of substantial length published in book form. The prize honours the work of Australian poet, Judith Wright.

== Winners ==
=== 2025 ===
- Winner: Mia Thom, Go Raging
- Linda Judge, Cooking Lessons
- Isabella G Mean, On the Future Distribution of Fruit Bats

=== 2024 ===
- Winner: L. K. Holt, Three Books (Vagabond)
- Manisha Anjali, Naag Mountain (Giramondo)
- Jarad Bruinstroop, Reliefs (UQP)
- Mitchell Welch, Vehicular Man (Rabbit Poetry)
- Petra White, That Galloping Horse (Shearsman Books)

=== 2023 ===
- Winner: Lionel Fogarty, Harvest Lingo (Giramondo)
- Michael Farrell, Googlecholia (Giramondo)
- Autumn Royal, The Drama Student (Giramondo)
- Simon Tedeschi, Fugitive (Upswell)
- Rae White, Exactly As I Am (UQP)

=== 2022 ===
- Winner: Pam Brown, Statis Shuffle (Hunter Publishers)
- Eunice Andrada, TAKE CARE (Giramondo)
- Dan Disney, accelerations & inertias (Vagabond)
- Gavin Yuan Gao, At the Altar of Touch (UQP)
- Ann Vickery, Bees Do Both: An antagonist's carepack (Vagabond)

=== 2021 ===
- Winner: Ouyang Yu, Terminally Poetic (Ginninderra Press)
- Evelyn Araluen, Dropbear (UQP)
- Benjamin Dodds, Airplane Baby Banana Blanket (Recent Work Press)
- Jaya Savige, Change Machine (UQP)
- Elfie Shiosaki, Homecoming (Magabala Books)

=== 2020 ===
- Winner: Pi O, Heide (Giramondo)
- Peter Boyle, Enfolded in the Wings of a Great Darkness (Vagabond Press)
- Stuart Cooke, Lyre (UWA Publishing)
- Ellen van Neerven, Throat (UQP)
- Charmaine Papertalk Green, Nganajungu Yagu (Cordite Books)

=== 2019 ===
- Winner: Alison Whittaker, Blakwork (Magabala)
- Liam Ferney, Hot Take (Hunter)
- Keri Glastonbury, Newcastle Sonnets (Giramondo)
- Marjon Mossammaparast, That Sight (Cordite)
- Omar Sakr, The Lost Arabs (UQP)

=== 2018 ===
- Winner: Michael Farrell, I Love Poetry (Giramondo)
- Pam Brown, click here for what we do (Vagabond Press)
- Bonny Cassidy, Chatelaine (Giramondo)
- Oscar Schwartz, The Honeymoon Stage (Giramondo)
- Bella Li, Lost Lake (Vagabond Press)

=== 2017 ===
- Winner: Antigone Kefala, Fragments (Giramondo)
- Jordie Albiston, Euclid's Dog (GloriaSMH Press)
- Carmen Leigh Keates, Meteorites (Whitmore Press)
- Cassie Lewis, The Blue Decodes (Grand Parade Poets)
- Omar Sakr, These Wild Houses (Cordite Books)

=== 2016 ===
- Winner: David Musgrave, Anatomy of Voice (GloriaSMH Press)
- Joel Deane, Year of the Wasp (Hunter Publishers)
- Liam Ferney, Content (Hunter Publishers)
- Sarah Holland-Batt, The Hazards (University of Queensland Press)
- Chloe Wilson, Not Fox Nor Axe (Hunter Publishers)

=== 2015 ===
- Winner: Les Murray, Waiting For the Past (Black Inc)
- Susan Bradley Smith, Beds For All Who Come (Five Islands Press)
- David Brooks, Open House (University of Queensland Press)
- Lucy Dougan, The Guardians (Giramondo)
- Robert Adamson, Net Needle (Black Inc)

=== 2014 ===
- Winner: David Malouf, Earth Hour (University of Queensland Press)
- Liam Ferney, Boom (Grande Parade Publishing)
- Rachael Briggs, Free Logic(University of Queensland Press)
- Anthony Lawrence, Signal Flare
- Judith Beveridge, Devadatta's Poems (Giramondo Publishing)

=== 2012 ===
- Winner: Peter Rose, Crimson Crop (UWA Publishing)
- Simon West, The Yellow Gum's Conversion
- David McCooey, Outside
- Anthony Lawrence, The Welfare of My Enemy "Of all the words for Missing, there's"
- Rhyll McMaster, Late Night Shopping (Brandl & Schlesinger)

=== 2009 ===
- Winner: Emma Jones, The Striped World (Faber and Faber)
- Sarah Holland-Batt, Aria (University of Queensland Press)
- John Kinsella, The Divine Comedy: Journeys Through a Regional Geography (University of Queensland Press)
- Bronwyn Lea, The Other Way Out (Giramondo)

=== 2008 ===
- Winner: David Malouf, Typewriter Music (University of Queensland Press)
- Judith Bishop, Event (Salt Publishing)
- Anthony Lawrence, Bark (University of Queensland Press)
- Alan Wearne, The Australian Popular Songbook (Giramondo)

=== 2007 ===
- Dr Laurie Duggan, The Passenger (University of Queensland Press)

=== 2006 ===
- Professor John Kinsella, The New Arcadia

=== 2005 ===
- Sarah Day, The Ship

=== 2004 ===
- Judith Beveridge, Wolf Notes

== See also ==
- Judith Wright
- Australian literature
- List of poetry awards
- List of years in poetry
- List of years in literature
