= Zenobia Frost =

Australian poet

Zenobia Frost is an Australian poet. In addition to her two poetry collections, her work has been included in anthologies and published in the leading Australian poetry and literary journals.

== Writing ==
Since 2008 her poems have been published in the Australian Book Review, Australian Poetry, Cordite Poetry Review, Griffith Review, Island, Meanjin, Overland, Voiceworks. and others. Her poem, "Bathers" was written in 2018 in response to Rupert Bunny's eponymous 1906 painting, held by QAGOMA in Brisbane.

In 2019, she graduated from Queensland Institute of Technology with a Master of Philosophy in creative writing for her thesis, "According to our bond", subtitled "The poetics of share house place attachment in Brisbane".

At the Queensland Literary Awards, Frost won a Queensland Writers Fellowship in 2017 and the Young Publishers and Writers Award in 2020. She received the 2018 Val Vallis Award for "Reality On-Demand" and, in 2023, with Benjamin Dodds, served as a judge for that award. In 2012 she was awarded a grant by the Copyright Agency Creative Industries Career Fund for a residency at Varuna, The Writers' House at Katoomba. She won third prize in the under-18 section of the John Marsden Prize for Young Australian Writers for her short story, "Mirror Mirror", in 2006.

== Selected works ==
=== Poetry collections ===
- Frost, Zenobia (2014). Salt and Bone. Walleah Press. ISBN 978-1-877010-64-4.
- —— (2019). After the Demolition. Glastonbury, Keri, (author of introduction). Cordite Books. ISBN 978-0-648-51162-5.

=== Non-fiction books ===
- Frost, Zenobia (ed.) (2020). Art Starts Here: 40 Years of Metro Arts. Metro Arts. ISBN 978-0-646-82289-1.

== Personal ==
Frost was born in New Zealand. She moved with her parents to Australia then England, before returning to Australia at age 11.
