= Thomas Shapcott Poetry Prize =

The Thomas Shapcott Poetry Prize, named in honour of a distinguished Queensland poet, is a literary award for an unpublished poetry manuscript by a Queensland-based author. The prize was established in 2003 and currently comes with prize money of $2000 and a publication contract with the University of Queensland Press. Entry can be submitted from anyone residing in Queensland and the award is administered and managed by the Queensland Poetry Festival on behalf of Arts Queensland.

== Award winners ==
2003 Lidija Cvetkovic, War is Not the Season for Figs

2004 Jaya Savige, latecomers

2005 Nathan Shepherdson, Sweeping the Light Back Into The Mirror

2006 Angela Gardner, Parts of Speech

2007 Sarah Holland-Batt, Aria

2008 Felicity Plunkett, Vanishing Point

2009 Rosanna Licari, An Absence of Saints

2010 Vlanes (Vladislav Nekliaev), Another Babylon

2011 Nick Powell, Water Mirrors

2012 Rachael Briggs, Free Logic

2013 David Stavanger, The Special

2014 Krissy Kneen, Eating My Grandmother

2015 Stuart Barnes, The Staysails (published as Glasshouses) (judges Felicity Plunkett and Justin Clemens)

2016 Shastra Deo, The Agonist (judges Felicity Plunkett and Justin Clemens)

2017 Rae White, Milk Teeth

2018 Anna Jacobson, I know I may not escape unscathed (published as Amnesia Findings) (judges Felicity Plunkett and Ali Alizadeh)

2019 Luke Best, Cadaver Dog

2020 Gavin Yuan Gao, At the Altar of Touch

2021 Janaka Malwatta, blackbirds don’t mate with starlings

2022 Jarad Bruinstroop, Reliefs (judges Stuart Barnes and Maria Takolander)

2023 Madeleine Dale, The Water-Bearers (judges Stuart Barnes and Maria Takolander)

2024 Eva Phillips, Borrow-or-rob (judges Jarad Bruinstroop and Eileen Chong)

2025 Mindy Gill, Confessions

== See also ==
- List of poetry awards
- List of years in poetry
- List of years in literature
