= Rae White =

Australian writer (born 1985)

- Born: 1985 (age 40–41)
- Occupation: Writer
- Website: raewhite.net

Rae White is a Brisbane-based poet and writer. White is non-binary and the founding editor of the online periodical #EnbyLife: Journal for non-binary and gender diverse creatives. White's 2017 poetry collection Milk Teeth won the Thomas Shapcott Poetry Prize, was commended in the 2018 Anne Elder Award, and was shortlisted for the 2019 Victorian Premier's Literary Awards. Their poetry and writing has been published in the Australian Poetry Journal, Capricious, Cordite, Meanjin, Overland, and Rabbit.

White's poems have been described as "challeng[ing] notions of category, identity, form and gender" and having an "ability to incorporate new techniques without alienating the reader". They are also involved in poetry judging panels, including the 2019 and 2020 Anne Elder Award. They have a Bachelor of Fine Arts in Creative Writing Production from QUT.

== Published works ==
- All the Colours of the Rainbow published by Hachette (2025)
- Bird Beak + Rock Shard in Celestial Bodies published by Tiny Owl Workshop (2024)
- now we’re all here and a trans person reads a poem in Nothing to Hide - Voices of Trans and Gender Diverse Australia published by Allen & Unwin (2022) This is noted as the first "mainstream", multidisciplinary anthology of Australian writing featuring the TGD community.
- Exactly As I Am published by UQP (2022)
- 'Abundantly blue' in Australian poetry journal (2021)
- 'wanna cyber??? ;))' in Antithesis Journal (2021)
- Milk Teeth published by UQP (2018)
- 'Glitter and Leaf Litter' in Capricious (2018)
- 'apollo pollination' in Meanjin Quarterly (2017)

== Awards and nominations ==
- Shortlist in the Queer Games Festival Awards for queer picnic (2024)
- Honourable mention in the Freeplay Awards for stand up (2024)
- Shortlist for the Poetry Award at the 2023 Prime Minister's Literary Awards for Exactly As I Am
- Shortlist for the Judith Wright Calanthe Award for a Poetry Collection at the 2023 Queensland Literary Awards for Exactly As I Am
- Shortlist in the Woollahra Digital Literary Award for Standup (2022) Published in Backslash Lit
- Digital Innovation Shortlist in the Woollahra Digital Literary Award for How to Haunt (2021)
- Highest Queensland Entry in the Queensland Poetry Festival Awards for The last tourist (2020)
- Shortlist in the Woollahra Digital Literary Award for who, what, why, where (2020)
- Highest Queensland Entry in the XYZ Prize for Innovation in Spoken Word for Hussshhh (2019)
- Second Place in the Rachel Funari Prize for Fiction for The Body Remembers (2019)
- Second Place in the Overland Judith Wright Poetry Prize for what even r u? (2017)
- Winner in the Thomas Shapcott Poetry Prize for Milk Teeth (2017)

== Prize judging and editor ==
- Steele Rudd Award for a Short Story Collection as part of the Queensland Literary Awards (Judge)
- Uplift Poetry (Creative Director and Founder)
- Australian Poetry (Board member)
- #EnbyLife (Editor)
- Anne Elder Award (Judge)
