= Bella Li =

Chinese-born Australian poet

Bella Li (born 1983) is a Chinese-born Australian poet. Li's visual poetry collection Argosy was the winner of the Victorian Premier's Literary Awards Poetry Prize, 2018 and the winner of the NSW Premier's Literary Awards 2018 (Poetry).

== Early life and career ==
Li was born in China in 1983. When she was three she and parents migrated to Australia. Li has an Arts/Law degree from the University of Melbourne. In 2020 she received a PhD from the same university for her thesis, "The Forest, the Desert and the Road: Chronotopes of American Spaces in Twentieth-century Long-form Poetry; and a Creative Work, 'Hotel America'".

Her poetry has appeared in Meanjin, Cordite and other literary journals. In 2017 Li was awarded a literary grant by the Australia Council. She served as a judge for the 2020 Overland Judith Wright Poetry Prize. Li was a resident at the Creative Australia B.R. Whiting Studio in Rome in 2023.

Bella Li is the author of Argosy (2017), Lost Lake (2018) and Theory of Colours (2021), published by Vagabond Press. In 2017, Argosy won the Victorian Premier's Literary Awards 2018 (Poetry). Li also won the NSW Premier's Literary Awards 2018 (Poetry) for Argosy, the Judges' Comments noting that, 'Bella Li’s sophisticated handling of language, form, time and image offers a remarkable synthesis of European surrealism and an antipodean sensibility, via a Chinese–Australian history. This important contribution to Australian poetic imagination and traditions doubles as a Southern Hemisphere rewriting and re-imaging of world traditions.'

== Awards and recognition ==
- Shortlisted, University of Melbourne's Australian Centre Literary Awards, Wesley Michel Wright Prize, 2014 for Maps, Cargo
- Highly commended, Anne Elder Award, 2017 for Argosy
- Shortlisted, Red Room Poetry fellowship, 2017
- Commended, University of Melbourne's Australian Centre Literary Awards, Wesley Michel Wright Prize, 2017 for Argosy
- Winner, Victorian Premier's Literary Awards Poetry Prize, 2018 for Argosy
- Winner, NSW Premier's Literary Awards Kenneth Slessor Prize for Poetry, 2018 for Argosy
- Shortlisted, Queensland Literary Awards Judith Wright Calanthe Award, 2018 for Lost Lake
- Shortlisted, NSW Premier's Literary Awards Kenneth Slessor Prize for Poetry, 2022 for Theory of Colours

== Works ==
- Li, Bella (2013). Maps, Cargo. Sydney: Vagabond Press.
- —— (2017). Argosy. Sydney: Vagabond Press. ISBN 9781922181961.
- —— (2018). Lost Lake. Sydney: Vagabond Press. ISBN 9781925735185.
- —— (2021). Theory of Colours. Sydney: Vagabond Press. ISBN 9781925735239.
