= Val Vallis Award =

Poetry award name after Val Vallis

The Val Vallis Award is an Australian poetry award named in honour of the Queensland poet Val Vallis (1916–2009). Val Vallis was a lyric poet who lectured in English and Philosophy at the University of Queensland. In 2002 the then Arts Minister, Matt Foley, announced "...the naming of a major poetry award, the first Arts Queensland Val Vallis Award for Unpublished Poetry to commemorate Val’s contribution to poetry in Queensland."

Bronwyn Lea the former poetry editor of University of Queensland Press then "designed and implemented the award" in 2003 and it today it is administered and managed by Queensland Poetry Festival (QPF) on behalf of Arts Queensland.

== Entry to the Val Vallis ==
Entry can be submitted from Australia wide as part of Queensland Poetry Festival's annual Poetry Awards. Submissions usually open in May/June each year.

Arts Queensland Val Vallis Award currently offers $2000 in total prizes for an unpublished poem or suite of poems for Australian emerging poets including the winner and r/up as well as support from Queensland Writers Centre. The prize is managed by and presented as a part of the Queensland Poetry Festival.

== Winners ==
- 2003: Jaya Savige
- 2004: Judy Johnson
- 2005: Ynes Sanz, Quandamooka Suite
- 2006: Nathan Shepherdson, The Easiest Way to Open a Door Is to Turn the Handle
- 2007: Andrew Slattery, Frameworkers
- 2008: Anna Krien
- 2009: Andrew Slattery
- 2010: Michelle Cahill
- 2011: Rachael Briggs, Tough Luck
- 2012: Chloe Wilson, Not Fox nor Axe
- 2013: B.R. Dionysius, Protein Gradients
- 2014: Chloe Wilson, The Heads of Holofernes (judges Judith Beveridge, Sarah Holland-Batt, Kent MacCarter)
- 2015: Andrew Last, Precedent (judges Melinda Smith and Michael Farrell)
- 2016 Caitlin Maling, Conversion (judges Robert Sullivan and Chloe Wilson)
- 2017: Bronwyn Lovell, Quietly, on the Way to Mars (judges Michelle Cahill and Stuart Barnes)
- 2018: Zenobia Frost, Reality On-Demand (judges Alison Whittaker and Angela Gardner)
- 2019: Damen O’Brien, Ice and Glass (judges Tamryn Bennett, Judith Beveridge, Yvette Holt)
- 2020: Helen Lucas, Heirloom (judges Felicity Plunkett and Samuel Wagan Watson)
- 2021: Dimitra Harvey, Cicadas (judges Sara M. Saleh and Andy Jackson)
- 2022: Dan Hogan, Aduantas (judges Lucy Van and Damen O'Brien)
- 2023: Jarad Bruinstroop, Fragments on the Myth of Cy Twombly (judges Benjamin Dodds and Zenobia Frost)
- 2024: Damen O'Brien, The Dam Dries (judges Yvette Holt and Sarah Yeung)
- 2025: Kate Rees, Sleeping in the Water Column
