= Shastra Deo =

Indo-Fijian Australian poet

- Born: 1990 or 1989; Fiji
- Education: University of Queensland
- Writing career
- Language: English
- Genre: Poetry
- Notable awards: ALS Gold Medal (2018)
- Website: https://www.shastradeo.com

Shastra Deo (born 1990 or 1989) is an Australian poet from Fiji. In 2018, she won the ALS Gold Medal for her first work of poetry, The Agonist.

== Early life and education ==
Deo was born in Fiji to a family of South Asian descent. She later moved to Melbourne, Australia, where she was raised alongside her brother.

Deo has said she wished she knew more Hindi, and that she is unable to pronounce her own name "properly."

Deo began her undergraduate degree at the University of Queensland in 2012. In her second year, she took a poetry course from Bronwyn Lea, inspiring her to start writing her own poetry. Later, Lea would be her supervisor for her Honors degree. She graduated with her Honors in 2015, later returning to University of Queensland for her Masters' (2020) and Doctorate (2022). Her doctoral thesis was entitled The Exclusion Zone: poetry as doing/being and was supervised by both Bronwyn Lea and Karin Sellberg.

Deo has two cats.

== Writing ==
Deo's poetry focuses on identity and trauma. Few of her poems feature herself directly, instead they are narrated by different personas. In an interview with Liminal Magazine, Deo said "To be honest, it bores me! Writing my own memory, that is." She has said that her only poems that refer directly to herself are Shastra Deo and Lexical Gaps.

Deo has a background in writing short fiction and fan fiction, the latter of which she hasn't published since 2010. She realized while at university that writing novels wasn't for her; instead, Deo prefers more "contained" fiction. Her background in writing fan fiction led her to describe her own poetry as a sort of fan fiction for various fictional universes: the Marvel Cinematic Universe and Final Fantasy XV. Characters she is particularly inspired by include the Winter Soldier, Will Graham, and Hannibal Lecter.

Her work, The Agonist, was the first published in University of Queensland Press (UQP) by a poet of South Asian descent. It was originally part of her honors dissertation at the University of Queensland. The Agonist won the ALS Gold Medal in 2018. On the win, Deo said she was "humbled" and "overwhelmed."

In 2018, Deo was commissioned to write a poem for Red Room Poetry's Poetry Object. She chose to write about the shivling, a representation of the Hindu god Shiva.

Her second book of poetry, The Exclusion Zone, was published by UQP in 2023. It was long listed for the 2024 ALS Gold Medal. The book covers themes like etymology, disaster, and memory. A review by the Arts Hub gave The Exclusion Zone an overall positive review, citing it was difficult, but important to read.

Her doctorate focused on nuclear semiotics. She spoke on a panel on nuclear fallout at the 2023 Brisbane Writers' Festival.

In 2024, Deo was awarded a writing fellowship by Liminal Magazine and Hyphenated Projects house. She used the experience to focus on her next book of poetry, Anatomy of the Sheep.

Deo served on the judging panel of the 2025 Judith Wright Poetry Prize alongside Harry Reid and Andrew Sutherland.

== Awards ==
- ALS Gold Medal longlist (2024) for The Exclusion Zone
- ALS Gold Medal (2018) for The Agonist
- Mary Gilmore Award shortlist (2018) for The Agonist
- Anne Elder Award commended (2017) for The Agonist
- Thomas Shapcott Poetry Prize (2016) for The Agonist

== Works ==
=== Poetry collections ===
- The Exclusion Zone (2023)
- The Agonist (2017)

=== Publications ===
- Deo, S. (2020). Writing precariously: branching narratives, command, and fictive agency in risk society. Continuum, 34(6), 887–900. https://doi.org/10.1080/10304312.2020.1842129.
