= Valentine Vallis =

Queensland poet, lecturer and opera critic

Valentine Thomas Vallis (1916–2009) was a Queensland poet, lecturer and opera critic.

== Early life ==
Vallis was born in Gladstone, Queensland on 1 August 1916. His father, Michael was a fisherman and wharf worker. Vallis wrote of his father, mother Daisy and siblings in a number of his poems. After attending Gladstone State School and studying secretarial work at Rockhampton High School (1929-1932), Vallis became a clerk in the Gladstone Town Council. Throughout his childhood he had been an avid reader with a love for poetry. His extended family introduced him to opera. He enlisted in the Australian Army in 1940 and worked as a signaller, before being attached to the Army Education Service in New Guinea, using his secretarial skills. He was posted to Singapore after Japan surrendered, where he helped prisoners of Changi prison return to Australia. His unit's major, Tom Inglis Moore who was working with the Australian Army Education Service during World War II, encouraged him to write and read American poetry. Vallis submitted poems through the 1940s to The Bulletin, with his first poem being accepted by editor Douglas Stewart in 1944. Vallis' poems would primarily celebrate the sea, inspired by his youth in Gladstone.

Following his war service, Vallis enrolled in a Bachelor of Arts at the University of Queensland, studying philosophy and English. He won the Monteith Prize for English in 1947 and Douglas Price Memorial Prize in 1948. He published his first book of poetry, Songs of the East Coast in 1947. He graduated with first class honours in philosophy in 1950. He was appointed to an Assistant Lecturer position in Philosophy, while he continued study toward his M.A. which he took in 1953. He was awarded a Birkbeck Scholarship to study at the University of London, where he took his PhD in philosophy and in particular, aesthetics in 1955.

After returning to Australia in 1956, Vallis lectured in philosophy and aesthetics at the University of Queensland rising to Senior Lecturer. He moved to the English department in 1965, where he would lecture on romantic poets, especially W.B. Yeats, aesthetics and Australian literature. He retired as Reader in 1981. His second book of poetry, Dark Wind Blowing was published in 1961. He edited The Queensland centenary anthology with R.S. Byrnes in 1959. Vallis' poems would feature on the Queensland Secondary School Curriculum for many years.

Vallis would be a writer-in-residence at the Australian Writer's Studio in Venice, Italy, organised by Bernard Hickey. His poem, Changi Chimes has been translated into Italian for the journal, Crocevia. He toured Queensland reciting his and others poems, and invited poet and friend Judith Wright to visit the University to give poetry sessions in the mid 1960s. His lectures at the University during the 1950s and 1960s would feature spirited debates with colleague, Cecil Hadgraft.

== Literary circle ==
Vallis was a member of a distinguished group of poets and writers, including Judith Wright, Gordon Fleet, David Malouf, Arthur Prior and Ken Hamilton. Vallis and Wright had a longstanding friendship and he sought to have her work gain the respect he thought it deserved, especially in regard to the creation of the literary journal Meanjin. They co-edited Witnesses of Spring in 1970, the unpublished poems of Shaw Neilson.

In 1958, Vallis' friend, Kathleen Campbell-Brown encouraged him to seek out architect Karl Langer to design a home for him in the suburb of Indooroopilly. Langer's design was praised for its economy. The house would be inundated during the 1974 floods of Brisbane, and would be raised and moved to a higher elevation after the clean-up by a group of his friends. He maintained a second home at Mt Tamborine for some years.

== Later life ==
After his retirement from the University, Vallis taught a history of opera subject to students of the Queensland Conservatorium of Music. He was the Brisbane opera critic for The Bulletin magazine. He also wrote for the arts pages of The Australian and as an Australian critic for the British magazine, Opera. He worked on the Australian Dictionary of Biography's team of writers for 10 years.

Vallis died on 14 January 2009 at age 92.

== Legacy ==
A poetry award, the Queensland Arts Val Vallis Award for Unpublished Poetry is offered each year.

He was honoured with a footpath plaque in Albert Street, Brisbane, on the Queensland Literary Trail in 1996.

== Oral History ==
Vallis was interviewed in 1980 by Hazel de Berg about his writing and career. He also reads a few of his poems. He was interviewed in 1986 by Barbara Blackman about his life and early childhood. These interviews can be found at the National Library of Australia.

== Works ==
- Vallis, Val; Moore, T. Inglis (Tom Inglis), 1901-1978, (auxilium.) (1947), Songs of the east coast, Angus and Robertson
- Vallis, Val (1961), Dark wind blowing, Jacaranda Press
- Byrnes, R. S. (Ed.); Byrnes, Robert Steel, 1899-1979; Vallis, Val, 1916-2009 (1959), The Queensland centenary anthology, Longmans
- Neilson, John Shaw; Wright, Judith, 1915-2000; Vallis, Val, 1916-2009 (1970), Witnesses of spring, Angus and Robertson, ISBN 978-0-207-12005-3
- Vallis, Val (1988) Heart reasons, these: commentaries on five Australian poet. Foundation for Australian Literary Studies. 9780864432803
