= Anna Krien =

Australian journalist, essayist, fiction and nonfiction writer and poet

Anna Krien is an Australian journalist, essayist, fiction and nonfiction writer and poet.

== Career ==
Krien has contributed to a number of Australian publications, including The Monthly, The Age, The Big Issue, The Best Australian Essays, Griffith Review, Voiceworks, Going Down Swinging, Colors, Frankie and Dazed & Confused.

Krien has written poetry for a number of years. Her poem, "The Last Broadcasters", won the 2008 Val Vallis Award and "Horses" was included in The Best Australian Poems 2010.

In 2014 she became only the second woman to win the £25,000 (A$47,000) William Hill Sports Book of the Year award since its inception 1989.

Krien has written two contributions to the Quarterly Essay — "Us & Them: On the Importance of Animals" and "The Long Goodbye: Coal, Coral and Australia's Climate Deadlock". In 2019 she joined the judging panel for the Horne Prize. As of 2019 she was based in Melbourne, Victoria.

== Awards and recognition ==
Krien was a recipient of a Sidney Myer Creative Fellowship, an award of A$160,000 given to mid-career creatives and thought leaders.

- Winner, Val Vallis Award, 2008
- Winner, People's Choice Award, Victorian Premier's Literary Awards, 2011, for Into the Woods
- Shortlisted, Victorian Premier's Prize for Nonfiction, 2011, for Into the Woods
- Winner, Harry Williams Award for a Literary Work Advancing Public Debate, Queensland Premier's Literary Awards, 2011, for Into the Woods
- Winner, William Hill Sports Book of the Year, 2014, for Night Games
- Shortlisted, Stella Prize, 2014, for Night Games
- Winner, Davitt Award for True Crime, 2014, for Night Games
- Shortlisted, Victorian Premier's Prize for Fiction, 2020, for Act of Grace
- Longlisted, Miles Franklin Award, 2020, for Act of Grace
- Shortlisted, Queensland Literary Awards, Fiction Book Award, 2020, for Act of Grace

== Publications ==
=== Nonfiction ===
- Into the Woods: The Battle for Tasmania's Forests, Black Inc, 2010 ISBN 978-1-86395-487-7
- Night Games: Sex, Power and Sport, Black Inc, 2013 ISBN 9781863956017
- Booze Territory, Black Inc, 2015 ISBN 9781863957687

=== Fiction ===
- Act of Grace, Black Inc, 2019 ISBN 9781863959551
