= Night Games (book) =

2014 book by Anna Krien

- Author: Anna Krien
- Genre: Non-fiction
- Publisher: Black Inc
- Publication date: 31 March 2014
- Publication place: Australia
- Pages: 288
- ISBN: 9781863956499

Night Games: Sex, Power and Sport is a 2014 non-fiction book by the journalist Anna Krien. The book narrates the trial of an Australian rules footballer who has been charged with rape.

== Summary ==
The night after an Australian Football League game, a woman referred to as "Sarah Wesley" attends a party that is also attended by several players from the Collingwood Football Club. At the party, she has sex with some of the players. After she leaves the house, she also has sex with a footballer referred to as "Justin Dyer" in an alley. While Dyer claims that the sex was consensual, Wesley accuses him of rape and makes a complaint to the police. Night Games follows Dyer's trial before the Melbourne County Court, which ultimately ends in an acquittal.

== Reception ==
Night Games received generally positive reviews. In a review in The Monthly, Ramona Koval called the book a "razor-sharp analysis" of the intersection between sport and Australian culture. A review in the Sydney Review of Books labelled the book a powerful expose of the treatment of women within football and within the legal system. In The Australian, Charles Happell described the book as well-researched, nuanced, and compellingly written. Malcolm Knox wrote in The Sydney Morning Herald that the book was well-written and persuasively argued, but that it lacked a degree of coherence once the facts of the case—namely Dyer's relatively low status within the sporting and social hierarchy—did not neatly align with the Krien's broader thesis about the toxic culture of professional sport.

== Awards ==
Awards for
Year	Award	Category	Result	Ref.
2013	Walkley Non-Fiction Book Award	—	Shortlisted	
2014	Davitt Award	Best True Crime Book	Won	
2014	William Hill Sports Book of the Year	—	Won	
2014	Adelaide Festival Award for Non-Fiction	—	Shortlisted	
2014	Stella Prize	—	Shortlisted	
2014	Western Australian Premier's Book Award	Non-Fiction	Shortlisted	
2015	Cross British Sports Book Award	New Writing	Won	
