= Sarah Holland-Batt =

Australian poet and academic (born 1982)

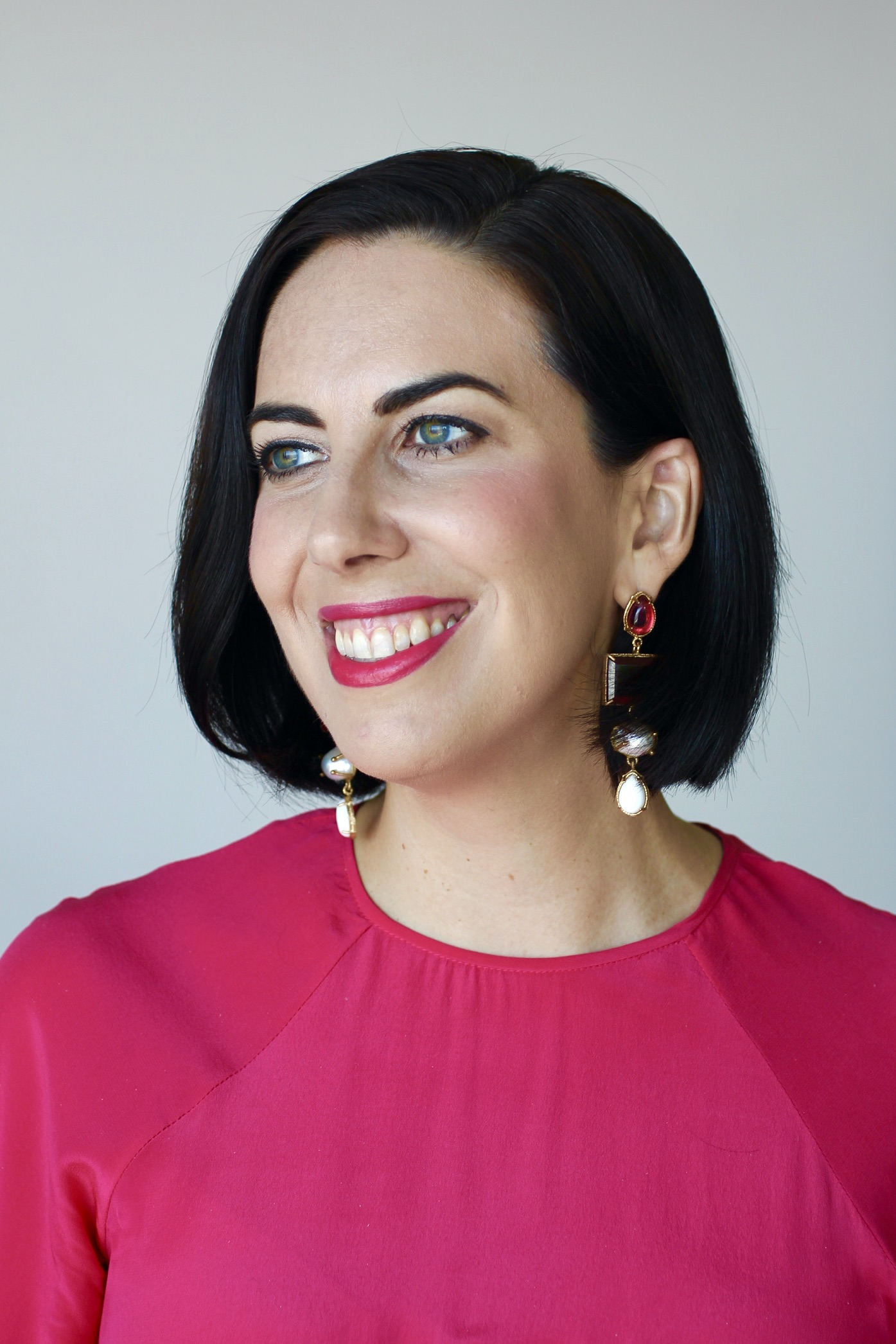
- Holland-Batt in 2021
- Born: 1982 (age 43–44); Southport, Queensland, Australia
- Education: PhD, MFA, MPhil, BA (Hons I)
- Alma mater: University of Queensland, New York University
- Known for: Poetry
- Notable work: Aria, The Hazards, The Jaguar
- Website: www.sarahhollandbatt.com

Sarah Holland-Batt (born 1982) is a contemporary Australian poet, critic, and academic.

== Early life and education ==
Born in Southport, Queensland, Sarah Holland-Batt grew up in Australia and Denver, Colorado.

She was educated at the University of Queensland, where she received First Class Honours in Literary Studies, an MPhil and PhD, and at New York University, where she was a Fulbright Scholar and attained an M. F. A.

== Career ==
Holland-Batt is the author of three award-winning volumes of poetry, Aria, The Hazards and The Jaguar, and a book of essays on contemporary poetry, Fishing for Lightning: The Spark of Poetry. She is also the editor of two anthologies of contemporary Australian poetry, Black Inc's The Best Australian Poems 2016 and The Best Australian Poems 2017. Aria, Holland-Batt's first book, received the 2007 Thomas Shapcott Poetry Prize, and was subsequently published by the University of Queensland Press in 2008. Aria subsequently won the Anne Elder Award and the Judith Wright Prize, and was shortlisted for the Kenneth Slessor Prize for Poetry, the Judith Wright Calanthe Award and the Mary Gilmore Prize.

The Hazards, Holland-Batt's second volume, was published in 2015, and went on to win Australia's foremost prize for poetry, the Prime Minister's Literary Awards, in 2016. The Hazards was also shortlisted for numerous other prestigious awards, including the Kenneth Slessor Prize for Poetry, the Judith Wright Calanthe Award, the John Bray Poetry Award at the Adelaide Festival Awards for Literature, and the Western Australian Premier's Book Awards Poetry Prize, and was named as a book of the year in The Australian, The Sydney Morning Herald, and Australian Book Review. Holland-Batt's third collection, The Jaguar, was published in 2022, and received the 2022 Book of the Year Award from The Australian.

Holland-Batt is the recipient of international fellowships from Yaddo and MacDowell colonies, a Hawthornden Castle residency, and an Australia Council for the Arts Literature Residency at the B. R. Whiting Studio in Rome. Her poems have appeared in numerous international newspapers, periodicals and magazines, including The New Yorker and Poetry, among others, and have been widely anthologised. In 2016, she was awarded the two-year Sidney Myer Creative Fellowship from the Myer Foundation.

Holland-Batt has served as a judge of the Prime Minister's Literary Awards, the Queensland Literary Awards Glendower Award, the Gwen Harwood Poetry Prize, the Arts Queensland Val Vallis Award, and the Australian Book Review's Elizabeth Jolley Short Story Prize. From 2014 until 2019, she was the poetry editor of Island Magazine. She is presently chair of Australian Book Review.

Holland-Batt is professor of creative writing and literary studies at the Queensland University of Technology. She is also an active critic, writing for publications including The Australian, The Monthly and Australian Book Review. The Australian appointed Holland-Batt in 2020 as their columnist for poetry.

The Sydney Powerhouse Museum commissioned Holland-Batt in 2025 to write an essay about the art of scrimshaw and the Australian whaler Alfred Evans.

=== Critical response ===
Holland-Batt's formal imagination transports the reader fluently through mythological, personal, artistic, geographical and historical landscapes. Violence, caused by the pursuit of beauty or truth, is appraised with virtuosity and unfailing precision. In the opening poem, "Medusa", Holland-Batt gives us the striking image of the drifting mind, 'pure and poisonous', drawing in its shadow as the soul billows out. This dichotomy portends the poet's almost surgical objectivity, her capacity for opening up subjects. Yet she animates these poems with the spirit of Perseus, courageously risking what is known for a language 'with a force that could break our lives'... Holland-Batt entwines the past into a rich and inventive lyricism of the present.

— Kenneth Slessor Prize citation for The Hazards

Holland-Batt's work has frequently been praised for its lyricism, linguistic precision, and metaphorical dexterity. Holland-Batt's debut collection, Aria, was described as "most impressive and haunting" by The Sydney Morning Herald, and as a "knockout" by leading Australian poetry critic Martin Duwell. Writing in The Age, Robert Adamson described Aria as evidence that "Holland-Batt appears to be a major poet from the start". In The Canberra Times, critic Peter Pierce likened Holland-Batt's "energetic approach to imagery" to that of Sylvia Plath, and praised her awareness of the "twin reserves of myth and metaphor".

The Hazards, Holland-Batt's second volume, was praised as "a virtuoso performance" by The Sydney Morning Herald, and "an absolute gem of a collection overspilling with poems of compelling urgency and dazzling accomplishment" by The Australian. Writing in Australian Book Review, Cassandra Atherton commented on Holland-Batt's "stark and sumptuous lyricism" and described The Hazards as "a thrilling psycho-geographical evocation of physical and internal landscapes". The judges of the Western Australian Premier's Book Prize observed that The Hazards is marked by "a kind of tough lyricism and an exacting use of language [that] makes for dramatic, assertive poetry" that imagines, "often through surprising metaphors, the 'real and imagined hazards' of living". Geoff Page, writing in The Australian, likewise noted Holland-Batt's facility with metaphor: "The Hazards is dense with metaphorical energy ... in the service of substantial moral and psychological insights."

Holland-Batt's third volume, The Jaguar, centres on the decline and death of the poet's father from Parkinson's disease. Critics responding to The Jaguar have focussed on Holland-Batt's command of metaphor. Poet Judith Beveridge, writing in The Australian, observed that the poems in The Jaguar "are intensely moving not only for their tragic content but because of the way in which the subject matter is explored through dramatic and metaphorical ingenuity. Few poets can achieve this level of transformation, allowing their images to move with argumentative force." Geoff Page, writing in The Sydney Morning Herald, states that "Holland-Batt's highly metaphorical style has been influential on numerous younger Australian poets, although few seem to equal her almost conversational ease in the medium," and observes that Holland-Batt deploys satire and plain diction alongside "denser, more metaphoric writing": "it's a mark of Holland-Batt's self-confidence that she can employ such a sardonic manner alongside other poems that are more orthodoxly poignant."

== Bibliography ==
=== Poetry ===
Collections

- Holland-Batt, Sarah (2008). Aria. St Lucia, Queensland: University of Queensland Press. ISBN 9780702236754.
- Holland-Batt, Sarah (2011). Pocket Mirror and Other Poems. Warners Bay, NSW: Picaro Press.
- Holland-Batt, Sarah (2015). The Hazards. St Lucia, Queensland: University of Queensland Press. ISBN 978-0-7022-5359-1.
- Holland-Batt, Sarah (2022). The Jaguar. St Lucia, Queensland: University of Queensland Press. ISBN 9780702265501.
- Holland-Batt, Sarah (2024). The Jaguar : Selected Poems. St Lucia, Queensland: University of Queensland Press. ISBN 9781780377049.

Anthologies (edited)

- Holland-Batt, Sarah, ed. (2016). The Best Australian Poems 2016. Melbourne: Black Inc. ISBN 978-1-8639-5962-9.
- —, ed. (2017). The Best Australian Poems 2017. Melbourne: Black Inc. ISBN 978-1-8639-5887-5.

Anthologies (contributor)

- The Best Australian Poems. (Melbourne: Black Inc., 2007, 2008, 2009, 2010, 2011, 2012, 2013, 2014, 2015)
- The Best Australian Poetry. Ed. David Brooks. (Brisbane: University of Queensland Press, 2008)
- The Puncher and Wattman Anthology of Australian Poetry. Ed. John Leonard. (Sydney: Puncher & Wattman, 2010)
- Being Human. Ed. Neil Astley. (U.K.: Bloodaxe Books, 2011)
- The Best Australian Stories. (Melbourne: Black Inc., 2011, 2012)
- Thirty Australian Poets. Ed. Felicity Plunkett. (Brisbane: University of Queensland Press, 2011)
- Young Poets: An Australian Anthology. Ed. John Leonard. (Melbourne: John Leonard Press, 2011)
- The Turnrow Anthology of Contemporary Australian Poetry. Ed. John Kinsella (Louisiana: Desperation Press/Turnrow Books, 2014).

Selected list of poems

- "O California", The New Yorker (2015)
- "Epithalamium", The New Yorker (2018)
- "The Gift", The New Yorker (2021)

=== Essays ===
- Fishing for Lightning : The Spark of Poetry. St Lucia, Queensland: University of Queensland Press. 2021. Collection of 50 columns on poetry from The Australian
- "Art, Idleness and Leviathans: Alfred Evans' Scrimshaw" (2025), Sydney Powerhouse Museum

=== Selected book reviews ===
- "Rough seas" (2014), reviewing Favel Parrett's 2014 novel When the Night Comes

== Awards ==
- 2007: Dorothy Hewett Fellowship for Poetry, winner for Aria
- 2007: Thomas Shapcott Poetry Prize, winner for Aria
- 2008: Anne Elder Award, winner for Aria
- 2008: Kenneth Slessor Prize for Poetry, shortlisted for Aria
- 2008: Judith Wright Calanthe Award for Poetry, shortlisted for Aria
- 2009: Judith Wright Prize, winner for Aria
- 2009: The Age Book of the Year Poetry Prize, commended for Aria
- 2010: Mary Gilmore Prize, shortlisted for Aria
- 2016: Prime Minister's Literary Awards, winner for The Hazards
- 2016: Western Australian Premier's Book Awards, shortlisted for The Hazards
- 2016: Adelaide Festival Awards for Literature John Bray Memorial Award, shortlisted for The Hazards
- 2016: Kenneth Slessor Prize for Poetry, shortlisted for The Hazards
- 2016: State Library of Queensland Poetry Collection – Judith Wright Calanthe Award, shortlisted for The Hazards
- 2021: Judy Harris Writer-in-Residence fellowship, at the Charles Perkins Centre, University of Sydney
- 2022: The Australian Book of the Year Award for The Jaguar
- 2023: Kenneth Slessor Prize for Poetry, shortlisted for The Jaguar
- 2023: Griffin Poetry Prize, longlisted for The Jaguar
- 2023: Stella Prize, winner for The Jaguar
- 2023: Queensland Literary Awards, Queensland Premier's Award for a Work of State Significance winner for The Jaguar
- 2023: Prime Minister's Literary Awards, Poetry Award shortlisted for The Jaguar
- 2024: Honorary Fellow of the Australian Academy of the Humanities
