= The Jaguar (poetry collection) =

2022 poetry collection by Sarah Holland-Batt

- Author: Sarah Holland-Batt
- Genre: Poetry
- Publisher: University of Queensland Press
- Publication date: 3/5/2022
- Publication place: Australia
- Pages: 144
- Awards: 2023 Stella Prize
- ISBN: 9780702265501

The Jaguar is a 2022 poetry collection by Australian poet Sarah Holland-Batt. The collection explores the death of Holland-Batt's father following a struggle with Parkinson's disease and dementia. The Jaguar was the recipient of the 2023 Stella Prize and the 2023 Queensland Premier's Award for a Work of State Significance, and was shortlisted for the Prime Minister's Literary Award for Poetry and the New South Wales Premier's Literary Award for Poetry.

== Background ==
Sarah Holland-Batt is a professor of Creative Writing at the Queensland University of Technology and the author of two previous poetry collections — Aria (2008) and The Hazards (2015). Her father, Dr Anthony Holland-Batt, suffered from Parkinson's disease for 20 years before his death in 2020, and developed dementia in his later years. He experienced abuse and neglect during his time in aged care facilities, leading Sarah Holland-Batt to become an activist for improvements to aged care conditions. She gave testimony at the Royal Commission into Aged Care Quality and Safety and has written extensively on her father's experiences in care. The Jaguar has been described as an extension of her activism, with Holland-Batt describing conditions in aged care facilities as a "human rights crisis" that demands greater public attention.

== Reception ==
The Jaguar received positive reviews in Australian Poetry Review, The Sydney Morning Herald, The Conversation, The Times Literary Supplement and Australian Book Review. The collection was described by the Stella Prize judges as consisting of "tender, memorable poems that capture grief and loss and love through unforgettable imagery, often blended with humour". Reviewers praised Holland-Batt's highly metaphorical use of language and her exploration of themes of death and illness. Writing in The Conversation, Julieanne Lamond wrote that Holland-Batt's poetry features "a combination of ruthlessness and tenderness, clear-eyed witness and imaginative flight".

== Awards ==
Awards for The Jaguar
Year	Award	Result	Ref.
2022	The Australian Book of the Year	Winner	
2023	Stella Prize	Winner	
2023	Margaret and Colin Roderick Literary Award	Winner	
2023	Queensland Premier's Award for a Work of State Significance	Winner	
2023	Prime Minister's Literary Award for Poetry	Shortlisted	
2023	New South Wales Premier's Literary Award for Poetry	Shortlisted	
2023	Griffin Poetry Prize	Longlisted	
