= Peter Lyssiotis =

Peter Lyssiotis (born 1949, Cyprus) is a Cypriot born-Australian writer, photographer and photomonteur. In 2004 he received a commendation from the Anne Elder Award committee for his work. His small press books include Industrial Woman (with Vivienne Mehes and Jas H. Duke), Journey of a Wise Electron and Other Stories, Three Cheers for Civilization and The Harbour Breathes (with Anna Couani).

His photographs and limited edition artist's books, including the following have been purchased by private collectors, libraries and galleries throughout Australia, the US, Switzerland, France, The Netherlands and Cyprus.

- The Harmed Circle
- From The Secret Life of Statues
- The Products of Wealth
- Feather and Prey
- Desire & The Brush
- The Dead Travel Fast
- The Ifs of Language
- The Look of Love (with Scott McQuire)
- "1316 Book 1" (with Angela Cavalieri)
- "1316 Book 2" (with Angela Cavalieri)
- Homeland (with Noga Frieberg)
- A Gardener at Midnight – Travels in the Holyland
- The Use of Ashes (with Theo Strasser)
- Eye Witness (with Theo Strasser)
- Using Shadows (with Theo Strasser and Robert Colvin)
- First there is a Mountain
- The River (with Monica Oppen)
- Seven Rooms (with Monica Oppen)
- Men of Flowers (with Humphrey McQueen)
