= Emma Jones (poet) =

Australian poet

Emma Jones, or Emma Scully Jones is an Australian poet. Her first poetry collection, The Striped World, was published by Faber & Faber in 2009.

== Early life and education ==
Jones was raised in Concord, New South Wales, a suburb of Sydney. Her father is Australian; her British mother had emigrated to Australia.

She studied at MLC School (in Burwood, Sydney), then worked and travelled abroad, returning to Australia to study English at the University of Sydney, where she graduated with the University Medal in 2001.

Jones entered Trinity College, Cambridge in 2002, and received a PhD in English Literature from the University of Cambridge.

== Career ==
Jones was poet-in-residence at the Wordsworth Trust in Grasmere, Cumbria from 2009 to 2010.

== Awards and nominations ==
- 2010: New South Wales Premier's Literary Awards: Shortlisted for The Striped World
- 2010: South Australian Premier's Awards: Shortlisted for The Striped World
- 2009: Fellowship of Australian Writers Anne Elder Award: Winner for The Striped World
- 2009: John Llewellyn Rhys Prize: Shortlisted for The Striped World
- 2009: Forward Poetry Prize: Best First Collection for The Striped World
- 2009: Queensland Premier's Literary Awards: Arts Queensland Judith Wright Calanthe Award for Best Collection for The Striped World
- 2005: Newcastle Poetry Prize for poem Zoos for the Dead
