= Anne Elder Award =

Australian poetry award

The Anne Elder Trust Fund Award for poetry was administered by the Victorian branch of the Fellowship of Australian Writers from its establishment in 1976 until 2017. From 2018 the award has been administered by Australian Poetry. It is awarded annually, as the Anne Elder Award, for the best first book of poetry published in Australia. It was established in 1976 and currently has a prize of A$1000 for the winner. The award is named after Australian poet Anne Elder (1918–1976).

== Award winners ==
Note: the award is made for a particular year of publication, but presented in the following year.

=== Prior to 2004 ===
- 1977: Laurie Duggan, East (R. Kenny); and Graeme Curtis, At Last No Reply (Makar Press)
- 1978: Lee Cataldi, Invitation to a Marxist lesbian party (Wild & Woolley)
- 1979: Les Harrop, The Hum of the Old Suit: Poems (Angus & Robertson)
- 1980: Richard Lunn, Pompeii Deep Fry (Randolph Press)
- 1981: Gig Ryan, The Division of Anger (Transit Press) and Jenny Boult, The Hotel Anonymous (Bent Enterprises)
- 1982: Kate Llewellyn, Trader Kate and the Elephants (Friendly Street Poets); and Peter Goldsworthy, Readings from Ecclesiastes (Angus & Robertson)
- 1983: David Brooks, The Cold Front (Hale & Iremonger)
- 1984: Doris Brett, The Truth about Unicorns (Jacaranda Press) and Max Richards, Under Mount Egmont and Other Poems (Neptune Press)
- 1985: Stephen J Williams, A Crowd of Voices (Pariah Press Co-op)
- 1986: Jan Owen, Boy with Telescope (Angus & Robertson)
- 1987: Sarah Day, A Hunger to be Less Serious (Angus & Robertson)
- 1988: Alex Skovron, The Rearrangement (Melbourne University Press)
- 1989: Mark Miller, Conversing with Stones (Five Islands Press)
- 1990: Jean Kent, Verandahs (Hale & Iremonger) and Barry Hill, Raft: Poems 1983-1990 (Penguin)
- 1991: Alison Croggon, This is the Stone (Penguin Books)
- 1992: Nicolette Stasko, Abundance (Angus & Robertson)
- 1993: Terry Whitebeach, Bird Dream in Four New Poets (Penguin)
- 1994: Not awarded
- 1995: Jennifer Harrison, Michelangelo's Prisoners (Black Pepper)
- 1996: Marcella Polain, Dumbstruck (Five Islands)
- 1997: Morgan Yasbincek, Night Reversing (Fremantle Arts Centre Press)
- 1998: Jane Williams, Outside Temple Boundaries (Five Islands Press) and Amanda Stewart, I/T: Selected poems 1980–1996 (Here and There/Split Records)
- 1999: Not awarded
- 2000:
  - Winner: Arthur M. Spyrou, Garden of Delights (Monogene)
  - Second prize: Brook Emery, and dug my fingers in the sand (Five Islands Press)
  - Highly Commended: Jen Crawford, Admissions (Five Islands Press)
  - Highly Commended: Samuel Wagan Watson Muse, Meandering and Midnight (UQP Black Aust. Writers)
- 2001: Not awarded
- 2002: Bronwyn Lea, Flight Animals (UQP)
- 2003: Chris Andrews, Cut Lunch (Indigo) and Kathryn Lomer, Extraction of Arrows (UQP)

=== 2004 ===
- Winner: Lidija Cvetkovic, War is not the Season for Figs (UQP)
- Highly Commended: Peter Lyssiotis, The Bird, The Belltower (Modern Writing); Miriam Wei Wei Lo, Against Certain Capture (Five Islands)
- Commended: Lucy Alexander Feathered Tongues (Five Islands); David Musgrave To Thalia (Five Islands)

=== 2005 ===
- Winner: Max Ryan, Rainswayed Night (Dangerously Poetic)
- Highly commended: Lucy Holt, Stories of Bird (Poets Union)
- Commended: Luis Gonzalez Serrano, Cities with Moveable Parts (Poets Union)

=== 2006 ===
- Winner: Libby Hart, Fresh News from the Arctic (Interactive Press)
- Highly Commended: Luke Beesley, Lemon Shark (Paper Tiger Media); Francesca Haig Bodies of Water (Five Islands Press); and Paul Magee Cube root of book (John Leonard Press)
- Commended: Jennifer Chrystie, Polishing the Silver (Ginninderra Press); Nathan Shepherdson, Sweeping the Light Back into the Mirror (UQP); and Simon West, First Names (Puncher & Wattmann)

=== 2007 ===
- Winner: Judith Bishop, Event (Salt Publishing)
- Commended: Elizabeth Campbell, Letters to the Tremulous Hand (John Leonard Press); Sarah French, Songs Orphans Sing (Five Islands Press); Hal Judge, Someone Forgot to Tell the Fish (Interactive Publications); and Petra White, The Incoming Tide (John Leonard Press)

=== 2008 ===
- Winner: Sarah Holland-Batt, Aria (University of Queensland Press); and Sandy Fitts, View from the Lucky Hotel (Five Islands Press)
- Highly Commended: Elizabeth Hodgson, Skin Painting (UQP)
- Commended: David Adès Mapping the World (Wakefield Press); and Carol Jenkins, Fishing in the Devonians (Puncher & Wattmann)

=== 2009 ===
- Winner: Emma Jones, The Striped World (Faber and Faber)
- Highly Commended: Emily Ballou, The Darwin Poems (UWA Publishing)
- Commended: Felicity Plunkett, Vanishing Point (University of Queensland Press)

=== 2010 ===
- Winner: Rosanna Licari, An Absence of Saints (University of Queensland Press)
- Highly Commended: Andy Jackson, Among the Regulars (Paper Tiger)
- Commended: Rachael Petridis, Sundecked (The Australian Poetry Centre); Chloe Wilson, The Mermaid Problem (The Australian Poetry Centre); Peter Coghill, The Rockclimber's Hands (Picaro); and Leah Kaminsky, Stitching Things Together (Interactive Press)

=== 2011 ===
- Winner: Mags Webster, The Weather of Tongues (Sunline]
- Highly Commended: Michelle Dicinoski, Electricity for Beginners (Clouds of Magellan)
- Commended: Vladislav Neklianv, Another Babylon(UQP); Fiona Wright, Knuckled (Giramondo)

=== 2012 ===
- Winner: Elizabeth Allen, Body Language (Vagabond Press)
- Highly Commended: Eileen Chong, Burning Rice (Australian Poetry)
- Commended: Toby Finch, Rawshock (Puncher and Wattman); Susan McCreery, Waiting for Southerly (Gininderra Press);

=== 2013 ===
- Winner: Vanessa Page, Confessional Box (Walleah Press)
- Commended: Susan Adams, Beside Rivers (Island Press); Luke Fischer, Paths of Flight (Black Pepper); Vanessa Kirkpatrick, To Catch the Light (Fence Post Press); Ainslee Meredith, Pinetorch (Australian Poetry/Express Media)

=== 2014 ===
- Winner: Cathy Altmann, Circumnavigation (Poetica Christi Press)

=== 2015 ===
- Winner: John Hawke, Aurelia (Cordite Books)
- Highly commended: Shari Kocher, The Non-Sequitur of Snow (Puncher & Wattmann), Linda Weste, Nothing Sacred (Australian Scholarly Publishing)

=== 2016 ===
- Winner: Berndt Sellheim, Awake at the Wheel (Vagabond Press)
- Commended: Stuart Barnes (poet), Glasshouses (University of Queensland Press), Lisa Brockwell, Earth Girls (Pitt Street Poetry), J. H. Crone, Our Lady of the Fence Post (UWA Publishing), Susan Varga, Rupture (UWA Publishing)
- Special Mention: Carmine Frascarelli, Sydney Road Poems (Rabbit Poets Series)

=== 2017 ===
- Winner: Rico Craig, Bone Ink (Guillotine Press)
- Highly commended: Bella Li, Argosy (Vagabond Press)
- Commended: Shastra Deo, The Agonist (University of Queensland Press), Omar Sakr, These Wild Houses (Cordite Books)

=== 2018 ===
- Winner: Eunice Andrada, Flood Damages (Giramondo)
- Commended: Maryam Azam, The Hijab Files (Giramondo), Marjon Mossammaparast, That Sight (Cordite), Lindsay Tuggle, Calenture (Cordite) and Rae White, Milk Teeth (UQP)

=== 2019 ===
- Winners: Cham Zhi Yi, blur by the (Subbed In), Gareth Sion Jenkins, Recipes for the Disaster (5 Islands Press)
- Commended: Alice Allan, The Empty Show (Rabbit Poets Series), Belinda Rule, The Things the Mind Sees Happen (Slow Loris/Puncher & Wattmann)

=== 2020 ===
- Winner: Ella Jeffrey, Dead Bolt (Puncher & Wattmann)
- Commended: Luke Best, Cadaver Dog (UQP); Rebecca Jessen, Ask Me About the Future (UQP)

=== 2021 ===
- Winner: Audrey Molloy, The Important Things (Gallery Press)
- Highly Commended: Evelyn Araluen, Dropbear (UQP); Lucy Van, The Open (Cordite); Damen O'Brien, Animals With Human Voices (Recent Work)
- Commended: James Lucas, Rare Bird (Recent Work)

=== 2022 ===
- Joint Winners:
  - Harry Reid, Leave Me Alone (Cordite)
  - Theodore Ell, Beginning In Sight (RWP)
- Highly Commended: Rebecca Cheers, No Camellias (Rabbit Books); Moya Costello, Pressed Specimens (Beir Bua Press); Gavin Yuan Gao, At the Altar of Touch (UQP)

=== 2023 ===
- Winner: Sara M. Saleh, The Flirtation of Girls/Ghazal el-Banat (UQP)
- Highly Commended: Ella Skilbeck-Porter, These Are Different Waters (Vagabond); Grace Yee, Chinese Fish (Giramondo)

=== 2024 ===
- Winner: Izzy Roberts-Orr, Raw Salt (Vagabond)
- Highly Commended: Hasib Hourani, rock flight (Giramondo); Barrina South, Makarra (Recent Work Press)

=== 2025 ===
- Winner: Ender Baskan, Two Hundred Million Musketeers (Giramondo Publishing)
- Highly Commended: Kristyn J Saunders, Slipstream, (Walleah Press); Connor Weightman, Fivehundred Swimming Pools, (Rabbit Poetry Journal)

== See also ==
- List of poetry awards
- List of years in poetry
- List of years in literature
