= Les Harrop =

Les Harrop (born 1948), is an English and Australian writer, editor, and teacher. He was also, poetry editor of Overland.

== Education ==
Harrop won a scholarship to a boarding school, and after eight years at a school whose curriculum had been Latin-based since the Middle Ages, and which he has compared both to a prison camp and to a dog-training institute, he progressed to Queen Mary College in the University of London. There he studied English Language and Literature (B.A., 1971) – for two years under the playwright Simon Gray. He transferred to King's College, Cambridge, but after his years during the 1960s in the Mile End Road and Fitzrovia, that ancient institution seemed, Harrop thought, "theatrical, less than fully grown up" and "a lot like more boarding school". At Cambridge he was mostly untouched by the afterglow of Maynard Keynes, E. M. Forster and Leavis, but was struck again by the strength of his inherited proletarian culture; his shyness seems to have hardened into a conscious distaste for bourgeois careerism (Marxist thought was still influential in the West at that date).

He had found a job through Gabbitas Thring at Arnold House School in St. John's Wood. After this spell as a teacher he went on a Killam Scholarship for postgraduate study to Canada – Social History at Dalhousie, Nova Scotia (M.A., 1974). There he had rewarding supervision from Rowland Smith, a South African whose interest was Wyndham Lewis and the political writers of the 1930s. Harrop ran into difficulties over the unwanted attentions of a homosexual instructor – as he has detailed in his essay 'After Tea with Dr. Hartley' – and he completed his Master's at the University of Toronto.

== Travels ==
He lived for nine months in Clermont-Ferrand, improving his French, and learned some German at Innsbruck, where he stayed with the family of the university librarian. He travelled much of Africa on a shoestring in the mid-1970s, from Casablanca to the Cape, and "dawdled" in Southern Rhodesia (Zimbabwe) at the time of minority white rule. After 1977 he settled in Australia with Nilofar Rizvi, a Calcutta-born and London-educated doctor from a part-Muslim family: his longtime partner and the mother of his two older sons. The couple acquired joint British and Australian citizenship about 1980.

In Melbourne, Harrop was poetry editor for Overland and founded the arts journal Helix (Canberra then Melbourne then Santa Barbara), which broke new ground in contesting the narrow nationalist agenda of literary Australia in the late 1970s. He completed his doctorate at the University of Melbourne with a psychological study of postwar poetry (1981). He was offered through Chris Wallace-Crabbe the Lockie Fellowship in creative writing at that university, but accepted instead a lectureship at the University of California. He afterwards returned to teach at Melbourne and other Australian universities and was, according to former students, magnetic and popular in that role. For all that, and despite having warmed to his American students, he remained restless in academic life. It continued to strike him as fundamentally unserious: chiefly a middle-class struggle for jobs – which impression was not altered by the inrush during those years of Theory over the top of traditional literary studies.

== ASIO ==
While on leave in Australia about 1986 he responded to an advertisement for a "government research officer", and found himself being interviewed in St. Kilda Road by employees of ASIO (Australian Security and Intelligence Organisation). Thereafter he dropped from sight for most of a decade, during which he trained as a specialist in southern Asia.

Harrop's first book of poems and the only book he has published in Australia was The Hum of the Old Suit (1979), winner of the Anne Elder Award. When he resurfaced he was living at his former address in Melbourne, and writing fiction. His novels Knight Galah and A Quarter in Tartary were shortlisted for the Angus & Robertson prize in 1994 and 1995 respectively. At about that time too he organised and began running the Melbourne Writers Group, which helped serious readers and would-be writers to get to grips with some mysteries of literary craft.

== Uneasy Retirement ==
Harrop has since retired from teaching and has devoted himself mostly to historical research and to writing about his native district, where his ruminations have permanent residence. The results are contained in his Lancashire Companion (a discursive encyclopaedia), in As It Were and Obedience Training (childhood and boarding-school memoirs). Harrop has never married though he is the father of three interesting sons. He has twice been conveyed through the Family Court of Australia, and his second encounter with the court appeared to affect his health and, according to his friends, undermined him for a time. It also projected him, perhaps against his finer judgement, into a wide-ranging and still incomplete study of modern feminism with the cumbersome working title: 'Eunox to your Clitorarchs Came'. The 'Eunox' is explained by the fact that Harrop has lived so long in the birth city of the Female Eunuch.

He has sometimes printed many poems and works alike, for unidentified reasons, under anagrammatic pen names: 'Pearl Shirloe', 'Hollis Reaper' and the like.

== Style And Heroes ==
Harrop's verse and fiction are characterised by physicality, by increasing technical sureness and a chaste, particular style. His discursive writing is trenchant if outré (he has been a close student of industrial-age social critics such as Carlyle, Arnold and Ruskin). The unhappiness of his personal life has perhaps made it easier for him to maintain the hypersensitive, pained innocence which marks all his writing and which, when allied to his eccentricity of opinion, will seem unpalatable to those who insist on a light quiche-and-salad in preference to strong meat. His emotional directness can jar on occasion, and can be prey to a certain linguistic excess, which seems strangely Victorian in one who has an evident admiration for Imagism, for the 'masculine' style of early Hemingway or of Faulkner's As I Lay Dying, and whose chief reading lies among their modern successors male and female (Beckett is a hero of his, and contemporary favourites include Coetzee and Mantel). It is surprising – or perhaps not – that such a fastidious, self-effacing person should wield such a heavy bludgeon on the page.

Harrop was raised an Anglican but has said that compulsory churchgoing relieved him in childhood of all religious faith. (He cites "a priest in women's dress, a haughty congregation and the evil temper of my choirmaster" in explanation of his atheism.) In late 2008 he moved out of "feminised Melbourne" (his phrase) to live in the nearby mountains; but within two months he was burned from this fastness by the bushfires that took so many lives. Abandoning his extensive library, he has renewed his commitment to writing since that catastrophe, settling in his sixties with his third son at a Pashtoun village about a day's journey from Lahore, Pakistan.

== Honors ==
- The Greenwood Prize of the Poetry Society of Great Britain (1976)
- Stroud Festival Poetry Prize (1977)
- Anne Elder Award (1980)
