= Jaya Savige =

Australian poet (born 1978)

- Born: 1978 (age 47–48); Sydney, Australia
- Occupations: Poet, critic, editor, academic
- Known for: Poetry

Jaya Savige (born 1978) is an Australian poet.

== Biography ==
Born in Sydney in 1978, Savige grew up in Queensland, on Bribie Island and in Brisbane, boarding at St Joseph's College, Nudgee. He attended the University of Queensland, where, after withdrawing from an LLB/BCom, he received a University Medal for his B.A. honours thesis in English on Shakespeare and Keats. In 2006 he completed an MPhil under the supervision of Bronwyn Lea.

His first collection of poetry, Latecomers (2005), was awarded the NSW Premier's Kenneth Slessor Prize for Poetry and the Thomas Shapcott Poetry Prize. From 2006 to 2011, he was poetry editor of the Australian Literary Review, the literary supplement to The Australian newspaper. Since 2010, he has been poetry editor for The Australian.

As of 2008, Savige was a Gates Scholar at the University of Cambridge, Christ's College. His second collection of poems, Surface to Air, was published in late 2011. Jaya Savige is a lecturer in English and head of creative writing at New College of the Humanities.

== Published books ==
- Change Machine (University of Queensland Press, 2020, ISBN 978-0-7022-6286-9
- Maze Bright (Vagabond Press, 2014)
- Surface to Air (University of Queensland Press, 2011, ISBN 978-0-7022-3913-7)
- Latecomers (University of Queensland Press, 2005, ISBN 978-0-7022-3519-1)

== Awards ==
- Queensland Premier's Award for a work of State Significance and the Judith Wright Calanthe Award for a Poetry Collection, 2021, shortlisted for Change Machine
- NSW Premier's Kenneth Slessor Prize for Poetry, 2021, shortlisted for Change Machine
- The Age Poetry Book of the Year, 2012, shortlisted for "Surface to Air"
- West Australian Premier's Poetry Prize, 2012, shortlisted for "Surface to Air"
- ALS Gold Medal, 2012, longlisted for "Surface to Air"
- NSW Premier's Kenneth Slessor Prize for Poetry, 2006, winner for Latecomers
- Dame Mary Gilmore Prize, 2006, highly commended for Latecomers
- Judith Wright Calanthe Award for poetry, 2006, shortlisted for Latecomers
- [Judith Wright Prize], 2006, shortlisted for Latecomers
- Arts Queensland Thomas Shapcott Poetry Prize, 2004, winner for Latecomers
- Arts Queensland Val Vallis Award, 2003, winner for Skirmish Point
