= Poetic Republic Poetry Prize =

The Poetic Republic Poetry Prize was an open online poetry competition judged by the community of entrants. It was active from 2009 to 2015, when the death of the organiser Peter Hartey led to its closure. The 2015 event closed before the results were announced but anthologies drawn from the submission were published.

The name of the Poetry Prize was changed from MAG Poetry Prize to Poetic Republic Poetry Prize for the 2012 event. The Poetry Prize 2012 and the Poetry Prize 2011 were supported by Arts Council England.

The Poetry Prize 2009 launched with no fixed prize fund. The prize fund accumulated in proportion to the number of entries. In 2011 this system was replaced by a guaranteed prize fund. The first three years of the Poetry Prize supported Mines Advisory Group with a donation of £1 per entry.

2015	Michele Crawford	"The Zoo"	Michele Crawford	"The Zoo" and "Ghost Dreams"
2014	John Keenan	"The Garden of Eternal Spring"	Natalie Sorrell Charlesworth	"Nervosa" and "Caulking"
2013	Bernie Brooks	"Dementia"	Shelley Nutting	"Drawer Life" and "Work in Progress"
2012	Shona Albouy	"Spider"	Sharon Black	"Water into Wine" and "Babel"

Year	Winner	Poem	2nd Prize	Poem	3rd Prize	Poem	4th Prize	Poem
2011	Francesca McMahon	"Ruby and Me at Baby Clinic"	Clare Foges	"Bank Holiday"	Suzanne Schenk	"The Hook"	Robert Wetton	"One Last Request"
2010	Francesca McMahon	"Honey Traps"	Anthony Stevens	"Bus Stop"	Joanna Humm	"Sea Story"	Emma Stapleton	"Life goes on"
2009	Francesca McMahon	"Thirteenth Birthday"	Michele Baker	"Miss Robertson"	Sharon Black	"Sea Glass"	Tatum Dunn	"Just like that"
