= Kate Durbin =

American poet

- Writing career
- Genres: Poetry, fiction, visual arts, digital art, pop cultural criticism
- Website: www.katedurbin.la

Kate Durbin is an American, Los Angeles, California-based writer, digital and performance artist. She is the author of several books of fiction and poetry including E! Entertainment, ABRA, The Ravenous Audience, and Hoarders. Durbin's work primarily centers around popular culture and digital media, exploring the way the Internet, reality TV, and social media affect society and the human condition. She has called popular culture the subject matter of her work, as well as her artistic material.

Of Durbin's writing, Christopher Higgs wrote for HTML Giant, "I call Kate Durbin one of the most compelling contemporary American writers because I feel like she's in her own lane. No one does what she does in the way that she does it." For Write or Die Magazine, Ben Fama wrote: "Kate has a gift of prophecy—she sees things happening before other people do, and uses this extreme present as material for her work."

Durbin began incorporating and transforming reality television dialogue and other minute details from these shows as a form of literature beginning with online publications in poetry journals of her transcriptions of MTV’s The Hills in early 2010. Her innovations have since been echoed in the work of other writers engaging with reality TV in literary contexts.

== Books ==
The Ravenous Audience, a collection of poetry that utilizes a wide variety of forms, was selected by Chris Abani for the Black Goat imprint of Akashic Books. The book deals with coming of age via a variety of media, from poems based on the films of Catherine Breillat to rewrites of archetypal figures such as Gretel, Little Red Riding Hood, Marilyn Monroe, Amelia Earhart, Jezebel, and Clara Bow. In a review for Rain Taxi, Johannes Goransson called the book "iconophilic, starving...a poetics of Plath-influenced engagement with the peanut crunching crowd." Poet Juan Felipe Herrera called it "a brutal tour de force."

E! Entertainment, Durbin's second book, was published in 2014, with two chapbooks first published in 2011 and 2012. It consists of stories crafted and re-shaped from meticulous transcriptions of reality television shows revolving around Hollywood, gender, class and lifestyle themes. The book's idiosyncratic "camera eye" voice elevates the details not normally noticed when one watches reality TV: the glossy surfaces, the quick cuts, the montages, the mumblecore, and the background objects. Some of the shows in Durbin's book are The Girls Next Door, Keeping Up with the Kardashians, Real Housewives of Beverly Hills, and MTV's The Hills. Durbin calls the book's format "literary television, a genre unto itself." E! Entertainment also explores the courtroom trials of Lindsay Lohan, Amanda Knox, and Anna Nicole Smith. Nylon magazine said of the book: "Durbin elevates petty O.C. arguments between Lauren Conrad and Heidi Montag to the status of serious literature." Heidi Montag praised the book, calling Durbin "pop culture's stenographer."

Her third book of poetry, Hoarders (2021), continues her work with reality TV. Kate Coldiron relates that "Kate Durbin has the distinction of being the only writer ever to make me seriously consider reality television as a cultural force." Hoarders examines the reality TV show of the same name and deals with the topics of consumerism, environmentalism, domestic violence, colonialism, and trauma. Alyse Burnside writes in the Atlantic: "Durbin's work has what the A&E show lacks: a capacious sense of humanity, a nuanced understanding of how consumerism might shape compulsions, and a deeply expressed empathy for the subtleties of life under capitalism...In this reinvention, each character's own narration takes precedence over the more salacious details of their disorder, bringing us into their personal, sometimes painful, worlds. Each poem consists of connected fragments, little piles. Each stanza reads like a conversation between the person and their stuff...The poems themselves are cluttered, yet their vibrancy is hard to overstate. Durbin astutely marries content and meaning, overwhelming the reader while dialing into our internal monstrous consumer."

Noughties, a re-imagining of her 2014 book E! Entertainment with new ink drawings by Durbin and re-worked pieces from the original book, is forthcoming from Wave Books in 2027. From the description: "Most pieces in Noughties were first composed through Durbin’s unique process of intensive surfacing, where she would watch a few frames of a reality show, pause, and write down everything she saw and heard—including all the background details and side players you're not supposed to notice. She then transformed the material into stories and poems recast out of the shows' own uncanny matter and machinery."

== Performance art and video art ==
Durbin's performance project Hello Selfie explored gender and the selfie phenomenon. The performance (2013-2015) took place "IRL," in a public setting such as a mall or art fair, and online on the Facebook event wall, simultaneously. It was the first performance artwork to explicitly explore the contemporary selfie phenomenon as a phenomenon. Durbin called it "passive aggressive performance art," because the performers ignored the audience, taking selfies constantly and uploading them to the Facebook event wall. The three iterations with women performers wearing underwear, colorful wigs, and Hello Kitty stickers, took place in Miami at the Pulse Art Fair, Union Square with Transfer Gallery, and Perform Chinatown in Chinatown Los Angeles. The iteration with men in no shirts and pants took place in Brisbane Australia in collaboration with Arts Queensland. Hello Selfie received critical attention in The New York Times, Public Art Dialogue, and elsewhere; it was featured in the show Body Anxiety curated by Leah Schrager and Jennifer Chan as well as a number of international and national art exhibitions in galleries and museums.

Durbin's performance/video art work "Unfriend Me Now!" debuted at Spring Break Art Fair in Los Angeles in 2018. Taking inspiration from Facebook's role in increasing polarization, it features a character called Facebook Clown, who is a representation of "Facebook becoming flesh." To create the script for the piece, Durbin searched for the term "unfriend me now" on Facebook's search bar, and collected status updates about the 2016 US Presidential election from both Republicans and Democrats, all of which included that phrase. These status updates became the script, and the words "Unfriend Me Now" became the clown's chorus. Durbin claims that Facebook contacted her twice in the months after she posted this work on Facebook, asking her to come into their headquarters to speak to them about Facebook. She did not reply to them.

== Internet and technology based projects ==
Durbin founded the online critical journal Gaga Stigmata: Critical Writings and Art about Lady Gaga in 2010, which ended its run in 2013. She co-edited the project with Dr. Meghan Vicks. The blog critically engaged with Lady Gaga's "shock pop phenomenon" and "moved at the speed of pop," responding to pop cultural phenomenon almost instantly after they occurred, a way of doing criticism that was new at the time. Gaga Stigmata received considerable press attention from sources as diverse as NPR, CBC's Q, Yale's American Scholar Magazine, AOL, The Atlantic, Spex, Huffington Post, Pop Matters, Berfrois, Voice Tribune, and many others. Members of Gaga's team, including Nicola Formichetti, hair stylist Frederic "Freddie" Aspiras, and visual artist Millie Brown have also tweeted and praised Gaga Stigmata's work. The journal has been used as a resource in classrooms across the world, and has been studied at conferences as a phenomenon in its own right, as a new way to do criticism in the era of the internet.

In 2016, Durbin and poet Amaranth Borsuk released their collaboration Abra: A Living Text, an interactive iPad app and artist's book that is an exploration and celebration of the history and future of the book. The app blends ancient book technology such as cuneiform tablets with modern references such as emojis. Durbin told Vice's Creator's Project that ABRA is: "a touch-based 'magical poetry instrument/spellbook' that creates a 'new way for regular people and poets alike to create and enjoy poetry in the era of the Internet and smartphones.' ABRA plays with elements of chance, as the user spins a dial to make new words appear. They also input their own language, which is then incorporated into the app's memory bank and reappears again later. The app uses a rainbow interface, with different words appearing in various bright colors. ABRA won the 2017 international Turn on Literature Prize for electronic literature.

== Personal life ==
Durbin has spoken about her childhood upbringing in fundamentalist Evangelical Christianity, where she was pulled out of school to homeschool, although she says she "did not do much schoolwork" and was "a feral child." It was during her childhood that she became interested in popular culture as a "window into the world" outside her home.

== Selected works ==
- Hoarders.Seattle, WA. Wave Books. 2021 OCLC 1950268136
- E! Entertainment. Brooklyn, NY. Wonder. 2014 OCLC 798717474
- Kept Women. 2012. OCLC 835147784
- The Ravenous Audience. New York. Akashic. 2009. OCLC 318876217
- Fragments Found in a 1937 Aviator's Boot. Chicago, Ill. Dancing Girl Press. 2009.OCLC 456560773
- ABRA. Center for Book and Paper Arts. Chicago, Ill. (iPad app and artist's book).
