= John Leonard (poet) =

Australian poet (born 1965)

- Born: 1965 (age 60–61); Cambridge, England, UK
- Occupation: Poet

John Leonard (born 1965) is an Australian poet.

He was born in the UK, and from 1984 to 1987 studied at the University of Oxford. In 1991 he moved to Australia, where he graduated from the University of Queensland with a PhD.

He lives in Canberra, Australia, where he works in the public service. He was poetry editor of the quarterly Overland from 2003 to 2007. In 2020 he was a juror for the Montreal International Poetry Prize.

== Works ==
=== Poetry ===
- Unlove (1991)
- 100 Elegies for Modernity (1997)
- Jesus in Kashmir (2003)
- Braided Lands (2010)
- A Spell, A Charm (2014)
- Think of the world: Collected Poems 1986–2016 (2016)
- Wordfall (2019)

=== Criticism ===
- The Way of Poetry (Three Pines Press) (2010)

=== History ===
- The Reawakening: Religion and the Future of Humanity (2015)
- The True History of Pocahontas (2015)

=== Fiction ===
- Shakespeare in Virginia (2024), based on the premise that Shakespeare's 1616 death was faked and he went on under an assumed identity to work for the English secret service in the Virginia Colony.
