= Queensland Poetry Festival =

Poetry festival and organisation in Queensland, Australia

Queensland Poetry Festival was the flagship program of Queensland Poetry, one of Australia's premier organisations for all things poetry. It existed to support and promote a poetry culture in Queensland and Australia, embracing the wide possibility of poetic expression in all of its forms. As well as hosting an annual festival, Queensland Poetry also produced a number of signature projects and programs throughout the year.

== History ==
QPF was originally founded by Brett Dionysius in 1997, an organisational role he continued in until 2001 when it was being run as the Subverse: Queensland Poetry Festival. Queensland Poetry Festival then continued under a number of Directors and Managers including Rosanna Licari (2002–2003) and Graham Nunn (2004–2007) whilst becoming the incorporated entity Queensland Poetry Festival Inc. in 2007. Since this new inception QPF has been directed by Julie Beveridge (2008–2009), Sarah Gory (2011–2014), Co-directors Anne-Marie Te Whiu and David Stavanger (2015–2017), Lucy Nelson (2018–19), and Shane Strange (2022–23).

In 2016 an event was held at Government House, Brisbane as a Celebration of the Queensland Poetry Festival's 20th Anniversary. In a speech delivered by His Excellency the Honourable Paul de Jersey AC as Administrator of the Government of the Commonwealth of Australia, he said:

Not only poetry, but also poets, have enjoyed special status. They have been credited with exceptional insight into our existence, coupled with great expressive powers ... for twenty years, the Queensland Poetry Festival has been a wonderful champion of the enormous cultural wealth that resides in poetry, particularly our own, and of poetry's capacity to enrich our Queensland communities and our State's culture.

QPF's 2017 Arts Queensland Poet in Residence, award-winning Mvskoke/USA poet and musician Joy Harjo said:

I have travelled to festivals, performances and residencies all over the world, from the U.S., to Europe, to India, to South America. The Queensland Poetry Festival residency remains one of the most memorable. I was warmly welcomed and taken care of from even before I arrived, then throughout the residency. Every detail was covered. I encountered a generosity of spirit in the sponsors and participants of each workshop, performance, and of course, the community. It was apparent that the Queensland Poetry Festival had made a beloved place in the community, through the efforts of its leadership and staff. They have a committed fan, in me.

The 2016 festival saw the emergence of a strong commitment to including more diverse and Indigenous voices including the creation of the Indigenous Poet in Residence (Sam Wagan Watson 2016 and Ali Cobby Eckermann 2017) and the inaugural Oodgeroo Noonuccal Indigenous Poetry Prize. Queensland Poetry maintains its commitment to supporting voices of Country.

During the Covid pandemic (2020–21), Queensland Poetry switched to providing a number of online programs in lieu of a live festival. In June 2022, an in-person festival was held in Brisbane/Meanjin with the theme 'Emerge'.

Queensland Poetry administered a year-long program of poetry workshops, programs, events, and competitions. These include: three Arts Queensland Poetry Awards in the Val Vallis Poetry Award, Thomas Shapcott Poetry Prize and the XYZ Prize for Excellence in Spoken Word (introduced in 2015), the Arts Queensland Poet in Residence, SlammED! and the Australian Poetry Slam QLD Heats & Final. Queensland Poetry also partnered on programs such as the monthly VOLTA event at Brisbane Square Library.

== Organisational structure ==
The incorporated structure of Queensland Poetry included a Management Committee, a General Manager, artistic director, Events and Marketing Manager and program coordinators. In 2016 Queensland Poetry was successful for the first time in applying for Organisational Funding for Operational/Staff costs for the 2017–2020 period via Arts Queensland. Since 2007 QP has been an incorporated community organisation with a dedicated and growing audience, with a strong tradition of volunteerism and known increasingly for celebrating poetry in all of its forms. QP had office space under a tenancy agreement with the Queensland Writers Centre, in the State Library of Queensland.

== Arts Queensland Poet in Residence Program ==
The Arts Queensland Poet in Residence program (2005–23) was a prestigious international program inviting one established poet per year, from outside Australia, to spend time in Queensland. The Poet in Residence's duties usually included performances at the Queensland Poetry Festival, group workshops and one-on-one mentorship sessions with local poets, and performances in regional Queensland. These were often provided at low or no cost to Queensland residents, in order to provide local writers with professional development opportunities.

In 2008, then Arts Minister Rod Welford noted the Bligh Government 'provided $50,000 for the 2008 poet-in-residence program, which is administered by Queensland Writers Centre in partnership with the Queensland Poetry Festival, Brisbane Writers Festival and the Judith Wright Centre of Contemporary Arts.' Early iterations of the residency had poets stay in Queensland for two to three months — often living at the Judith Wright Arts Centre itself; however, later iterations reduced this timeframe to a few weeks or less as funding reduced.

Arts Queensland noted that the program was 'designed to develop Queensland's poetry culture by providing a residency for a high-profile poet or spoken word artist to engage directly with Queensland poets and poetry community in a meaningful and collaborative way'. The program was considered to have far-reaching impact on Queensland literature.

During the COVID-19 pandemic, the program commissioned 'digital' residencies, through which poets and spoken word performers facilitated online workshops and wrote or performed new work.

=== Previous Poets in Residence ===
- 2023 Poet in (Digital) Residence: Naomi Shihab Nye (USA)
- 2022–23 Poet in Residence: Joelle Taylor (UK)
- 2021 Poets in (Digital) Residence: Eileen Myles (USA), Laniyuk (AU) and Andy Jackson (AU)
- 2020 Poets in (Digital) Residence: Ivan Coyote, Kate Durbin, Amina Atiq (UK), Nick Makoha (UK)
- 2019: former New Zealand Poet Laureate Selina Tusitala Marsh
- 2018: Yona Harvey (USA)
- 2017: former American Poet Laureate Joy Harjo (August 5–19) and Courtney Sina Meredith (NZ)
- 2016: Jeet Thayil (India)
- 2015: Kate Durbin (USA)
- 2014: Warsan Shire (UK)
- 2013: Shane Rhodes (Canada)
- 2010: Emily XYZ (USA)
- 2009: Hinemoana Baker (NZ)
- 2008: Michael Hofmann (Germany)
- 2006: Paul Durcan (Ireland)
- 2006: Louise Wallwein (UK)
- 2005 (inaugural): Jacqueline Turner (Canda)

== Oodgeroo Noonuccal Indigenous Poetry Prize ==
In 2016 the Queensland Poetry Festival introduced an Indigenous program, which included the inaugural Oodgeroo Noonuccal Indigenous Poetry Prize. The prize was named in honour of Aboriginal poet Oodgeroo Noonuccal, with the permission of her family and after consultation with Quandamooka Festival. It is the only open-age Indigenous poetry prize for an unpublished poem.

Past winners have included: Julie Janson / Andrew Booth; Jeanine Leane / Sachem Parkin-Owens; Brenda Saunders; Jeanine Leane; Mykaela Saunders; Kaurna / Ngarrindjeri poet Dominic Guerrera (2021); Cheryl Leavy; Adam Brannigan; and Nathan mudyi Sentance.

== Past guests ==
In its history the festival has featured some of the world's finest poets, spoken word artists singer-songwriters and other artists including Mark Doty (US), Ali Cobby Eckermann, Joy Harjo (US), Jennifer Maiden and Maxine Beneba Clarke in 2017; Tracy K. Smith (US), Jeet Thayil (India), Lionel Fogarty, Ivan Coyote (Canada) and Tishani Doshi (India) in 2016; Kate Durbin (US), Les Murray, MacGillivray (Scotland) and David Brooks in 2015; Warsan Shire (UK) and Christian Bok (2014); Shane Rhodes (2013 – Canada); Angela Rawlings (2012 – Canada); Jacob Polley (2011 – UK); Emily XYZ (2010 – USA) and August Kleinzahler (2010 – USA), Hinemoana Baker (NZ) and Neil Murray (2009) Shane Koyczan (2007 – Canada), Chris Bailey (2005 – The Saints), and Dave Graney (2006).

== See also ==
- List of festivals in Brisbane
- List of festivals in Australia
