= Lidija Cvetkovic =

Australian poet

Lidija Cvetkovic (born 1967) is a contemporary Australian poet.

Lidija Cvetkovic was born in the former Yugoslavia and emigrated to Australia with her family in 1980. She earned a BA at the University of Queensland and has worked as a teacher and currently as a psychologist. Her writing draws on her Yugoslav heritage and the former country's history in an intensely lyrical manner. Her War is Not the Season for Figs won the 2003 Thomas Shapcott Poetry Prize and the 2004 Anne Elder Award.

== Works ==
Poetry

- War Is Not The Season For Figs. (UQP, 2004) ISBN 0-7022-3484-2
