= Maria Takolander =

Australian poet and literary critic

== Biography ==
Maria Takolander is a Finnish-Australian writer of poetry, fiction, and non-fiction. She has published seven books: a novel, The End of Romance (Text 2026); a collection of short stories, The Double (Text, 2013); a book of literary criticism, Catching Butterflies: Bringing Magical Realism to Ground (Peter Lang, 2007); and four collections of poems, Trigger Warning (UQP, 2021), The End of the World (Giramondo, 2014), Ghostly Subjects (Salt, 2009) and Narcissism (Whitmore Press, 2005). She is also co-editor of The Limits of Life Writing (Routledge, 2018). She has a PhD in Literary Studies.

Takolander won the inaugural 2010 Australian Book Review Elizabeth Jolley Short Story Prize, was a runner-up in the inaugural Australian Book Review Peter Porter Poetry Prize, and came second in the 2026 Australian Book Review Calibre Essay Prize. Her book of short stories, The Double, was shortlisted for the Melbourne Prize for Literature Best New Writing award. Her poetry collection Ghostly Subjects was shortlisted for a 2010 Queensland Premier's Literary Award. Trigger Warning won the 2022 Victorian Premier's Literary Award and was shortlisted for the 2022 Australian Literary Society Gold Medal.

Takolander's short stories and essays have been widely published, and her poems widely published and anthologised. Her anthologised poems can be found in The Best Australian Poems 2005 (Black Inc), The Best Australian Poetry 2006 (UQP), The Best Australian Poems 2007 (Black Inc), The Best Australian Poems 2008 (Black Inc), The Best Australian Poems 2009 (Black Inc), The Best Australian Poetry 2009 (UQP), The Best Australian Poems 2010 (Black Inc), The Best Australian Poems 2011 (Black Inc), The Best Australian Poems 2012 (Black Inc), The Best Australian Poems 2013 (Black Inc), The Best Australian Poems 2014 (Black Inc), The Best Australian Poems 2015 (Black Inc), The Best Australian Poems 2016 (Black Inc), The Best Australian Poems 2017 (Black Inc) and The Best Australian Poems 2018 (Black Inc). They also appear in Thirty Australian Poets (UQP 2011), The turnrow Anthology of Contemporary Australian Poetry (Turnrow 2014), #MeToo: Stories from the Australian Movement (Picador 2019), The Anthology of Australian Prose Poetry (MUP 2020), Contemporary Australian Poetry (Puncher & Wattmann 2016), Fishing for Lightning: The Spark of Poetry (UQP 2021), and Homings and Departures: Selected Poems from Contemporary China and Australia (Recent Work Press 2021). Her poems have been translated into Spanish, German, Macedonian, and Mandarin, and she has performed her poetry on radio and TV, as well as at various festivals, including the world-famous Medellin International Poetry Festival in Colombia, where she represented Australia.

Takolander's words have also featured on public artworks, including Melbourne trams, at the Royal Botanic Gardens Victoria, and on the Bronze Stories plaques and walking trails app in Geelong.

Professor Bronwyn Lea has written of Takolander's poetry: "Takolander’s poems are ruinous, diabolical, all the more so for their polish and precision. Here, as in Baudelaire, beauty is inextricably linked with evil: it’s 'the dark italics', as Wallace Stevens phrased it, that compels the poetic imagination in these poems … Don’t be surprised if they take up residence in your body after reading them … it’s just that kind of book."

Geordie Williamson, formerly chief literary critic at The Australian, has written of The Double: "Takolander, though immured in the same darkling stuff as Plath, always remains in command. Hers are a series of thought experiments in which enduring Western narratives are recast according to the author's imaginative and philosophical inclinations. The results are fiercely intelligent and idiosyncratic, sometimes shot through with black humour, sometimes pressing down on the reader with the full weight of human horror...Individually, Takolander's stories can be bleak. But collectively they are thrilling. Slender as this collection may be, it announces the arrival of a considerable talent."

== Awards ==
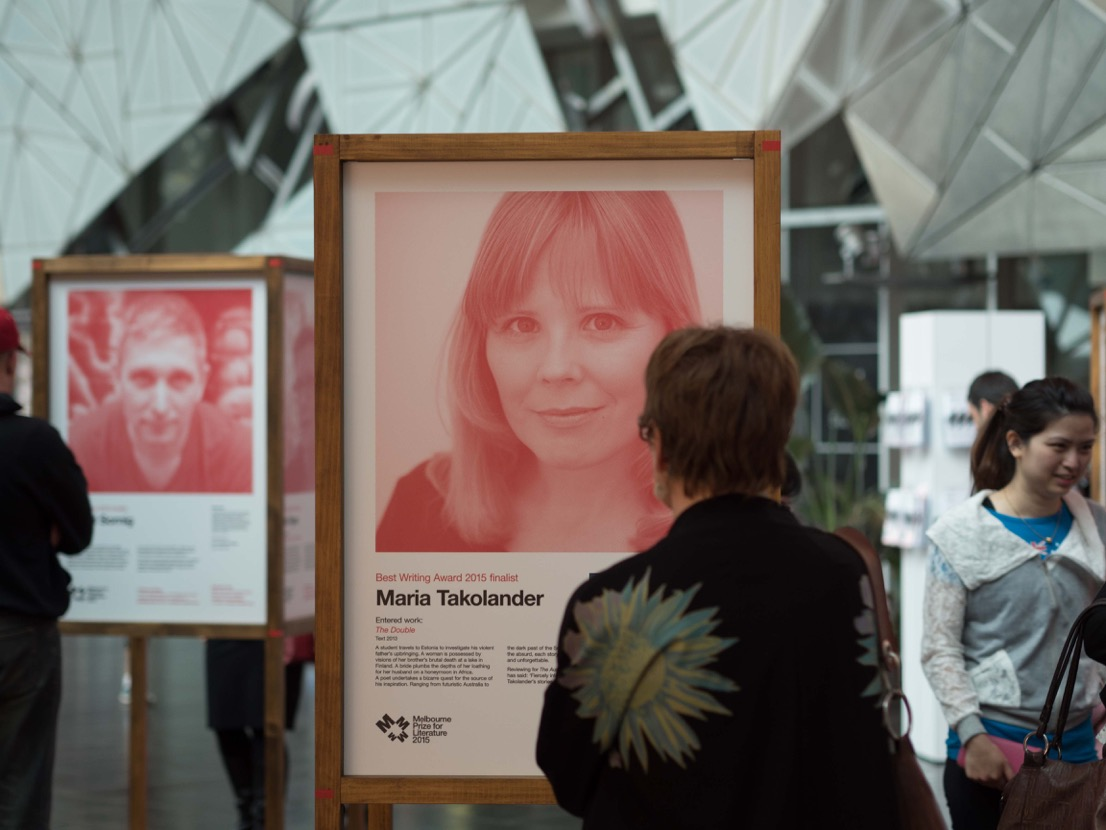
Melbourne Prize for Literature - Maria Takolander

2026 Second place, Australian Book Review Calibre Essay Prize for 'Tumbleweed: How the West was Lost'

2022 Winner, Victorian Premier's Literary Award for Trigger Warning

2022 Short-listed, Australian Literature Society Gold Medal for Trigger Warning

2015 Short-listed, Melbourne Prize for Literature Best New Writing Award for The Double and Other Stories

2010 Winner, Australian Book Review Elizabeth Jolley Short Story Prize for 'A Roankin Philosophy of Poetry'

2010 Short-listed, Queensland Premier's Literary Award for Ghostly Subjects

2005 Short-listed, Australian Book Review Peter Porter Poetry Prize for 'Storm'

== Bibliography ==
=== Fiction ===
- —— (2026). The End of Romance. Melbourne: Text Publishing.
- —— (2013). The Double: (And Other Stories). Melbourne: Text Publishing.

=== Poetry ===
- —— (2005). Narcissism. Geelong: Whitmore Press.
- —— (2009). Ghostly Subjects. Cambridge: Salt.
- —— (2014). The End of the World. Artarmon: Giramondo.
- —— (2021). Trigger Warning. St Lucia: UQP.

=== Non-fiction ===
- —— (2007). Catching Butterflies: Bringing Magical Realism to Ground. Bern: Peter Lang.
- —— (2018). The Limits of Life Writing. Oxon: Routledge.
