= Felicity Plunkett =

Australian poet and critic

- Occupations: Poet and critic
- Writing career
- Language: English
- Years active: 1994–
- Notable work: Vanishing Point
- Notable awards: 2008 Thomas Shapcott Poetry Prize winner

Felicity Plunkett is an Australian poet, literary critic, editor and academic.

== Biography ==
Felicity Plunkett is a writer of poetry, essays, and short stories, and a widely published critic.

She has a BA (Honours) and PhD from the University of Sydney and began her career as a university academic. She was poetry editor at the University of Queensland Press from 2010 to 2018.

In 2016, she wrote a lyric, Todesfuge, for composer Andrée Greenwell's album, Gothic.

She worked with composer Andrew Ford, writing "Respair" for his song cycle Red Dirt Hymns.

== Awards and nominations ==
- ABC Radio National 2003 Short Story Competition for "Sleeping Like a Baby"
- Newcastle Poetry Prize, 2005, shortlisted for The Sea in a Sieve
- Dorothy Sargent Rosenberg Prize, 2006 for October's Road and Inside Your Wardrobe
- Dorothy Sargent Rosenberg Prize, 2007, for Articulate; Stitching the Night; Learning the Bones
- Thomas Shapcott Poetry Prize, 2008, winner for Vanishing Point
- Anne Elder Award, 2009, commended for Vanishing Point
- Josephine Ulrick Literature Prize, 2010, commended for Ruined Girls
- Western Australian Premier's Book Awards (Poetry), 2010, shortlisted for Vanishing Point
- Arts ACT Judith Wright Award, 2010, commended for Vanishing Point
- Nillumbik Ekphrasis Poetry Award, 2014, for Lost Sea Voices
- Newcastle Poetry Prize, 2014, shortlisted for Glass Letters
- Newcastle Poetry Prize, 2015, shortlisted for Songs in a Red Key and On carrying: seven cledons
- Montreal International Poetry Prize, 2015, shortlisted for What the Sea Remembers
- Montreal International Poetry Prize, 2017, shortlisted for Syzygy (Scrabble with Ivy)
- Newcastle Poetry Prize, 2017, shortlisted for 13 Uses for a Poem
- Australian Catholic University Poetry Prize, 2018, for Sound Bridge
- University of Canberra VC International Poetry Prize, 2018, shortlisted for Carpus Diem
- Woollahra Digital Literary Award, 2021, non-fiction, shortlisted for True to Form: A.E. Stallings, Jenny Xie, Ada Límon
- Woollahra Digital Literary Award, 2022, non-fiction, shortlisted for Plath Traps

== Selected publications ==
=== Poetry collections ===
- —— (2009). Vanishing Point. St Lucia, Qld: University of Queensland Press. ISBN 9780702237218.
- —— (2011). Seastrands. Sydney: Vagabond Press. ISBN 9780702262708.
- —— (2020). A Kinder Sea. University of Queensland Press. ISBN 9780702262708.

=== Anthologies (editor) ===
- Thirty Australian Poets, University of Queensland Press, 2011)
- States of Poetry Queensland (ABR, 2016)
- States of Poetry Queensland (ABR, 2017)

=== Anthologies (contributor) ===
- Skylines: New Writing From New England (2000) ISBN 9780646378770
- Calyx: 30 Contemporary Australian Poets (Paper Bark Press. 2001) ISBN 9781876749187
- The Best Australian Poems (Black Inc 2008). Edited by Peter Rose. ISBN 9781863953030
- Best Australian Poetry 2008 (University of Queensland Press 2008). Edited by David Brooks. ISBN 9780702236549
- The Best Australian Poems 2009 (Black Inc. 2009). Edited by Robert Adamson. ISBN 9781863954525
- The Puncher and Wattman Anthology of Australian Poetry. Ed. John Leonard. (Sydney: Puncher & Wattman, 2010
- The Best Australian Poems 2011 (Black Inc. 2011). Edited by John Tranter. ISBN 9781863955492
- Global Poetry Anthology 2015 (Véhicule Press. 2015) Edited by Gabeba Baderoon, Kate Clanchy, Carolyn Forché, Amanda Jernigan, Anthony Lawrence, Niyi Osundare, Jennifer Rahim, K. Satchidanandan, Michael Schmidt, Bruce Taylor. ISBN 9781550654363
- Global Poetry Anthology 2017 (Véhicule Press. 2017) Edited by Kim Addonizio, David Dabydeen, Vona Groarke, Susan Nalugwa Kiguli, Arvind Krishna Mehrotra, Pascale Petit, Talya Rubin, Carmine Starnino, Mark Tredinnick, Joseph Akawu Ushie. ISBN 9781550654844
- The Turnrow Anthology of Contemporary Australian Poetry. Ed. John Kinsella (Louisiana: Desperation Press/Turnrow Books, 2014).
- Best of Australian Poems 2021. Ed. Ellen van Neerven and Toby Fitch. (Melbourne: Australian Poetry, 2021).
- The Language in My Tongue: An Anthology of Australian and New Zealand Poetry. Ed. Cassandra Atherton and Paul Hetherington. (USA: MadHat Press, 2022).

=== Essays ===
- "Plath Traps", Sydney Review of Books
- "A mutinous and ferocious grace". Nick Cave and Trauma's Aftermath, Australian Book Review,
- "Sound Bridges: a Portrait of Gurrumul", Australian Book Review,

=== Short stories ===
- "Ruined Girls". Commended, Josephine Ulrick Literature Prize 2010,
- "In the Shade". Review of Australian Fiction, Vol. 2, Issue 6,
- "Sleeping Like a Baby". ABC Radio National

=== Book reviews ===
Plunkett, Felicity (September 2014). "Our terrible projections : Helen Garner and the corridors of empathy". Australian Book Review. 364: 15–17. on Garner, Helen. This house of grief. Text Publishing.
