= Montreal International Poetry Prize =

- Country: Canada
- Status: Active
- First award: 2011 (Launched)
- Website: https://www.montrealpoetryprize.com

The Montreal International Poetry Prize (also known as The Montreal Prize) is a biennial poetry competition based in Montreal, Quebec, Canada. It was launched in April 2011 during National Poetry Month.

The competition invites online submissions of poems in English from anywhere in the world, and is adjudicated by a jury that has ranged from 10 to 13 international jurors over the years, which changes every competition, but the winner is selected by a single judge - in 2011, it was former British Poet Laureate Andrew Motion. Subsequent judges have been Don Paterson in 2013, Eavan Boland in 2015, Michael Harris in 2017, Yusef Komunyakaa in 2020, Lorna Goodison in 2022, and A.E. Stallings in 2024. Natalie Diaz is the judge for the 2026 Montreal Prize.

The $20,000 (CAD) prize is thought to be the world's largest monetary prize for a single poem.

In addition to the winning poem, the Montreal Prize publishes, with Véhicule Press, the shortlisted poems in a printed anthology. The Véhicule Press poetry imprint, Signal Editions published The Global Poetry Anthology in 2011, 2013, 2015, and 2017. In 2011 and 2013 the Montreal Prize produced an electronic longlist anthology. In 2015 the Montreal Prize discontinued the long list anthology before starting it back up again, still with Véhicule Press, in 2020, 2022, and 2025.

The Department of English at McGill University manages the Montreal Prize as of 2018.

== Winners ==
| Year | Winner |
|---|---|
| 2011 | Mark Tredinnick |
| 2013 | Mia Anderson |
| 2015 | Eva H.D. |
| 2017 | Erin Rodoni |
| 2020 | Victoria Korth |
| 2022 | Claire Wahmanholm |
| 2024 | Kizziah Burton |
