= Meanjin =

Australian literary journal

- Editor: vacant
- Publisher: Queensland University of Technology
- Founder: Clem Christesen
- First issue: December 1940
- Country: Australia
- Based in: Brisbane (1940–1945, 2026–present); Melbourne (1945–2025)
- Website: meanjin.com.au
- ISSN: 0815-953X
- OCLC: 3972868

Meanjin (/miˈændʒɪn/), formerly Meanjin Papers and Meanjin Quarterly, is one of Australia's longest-running literary magazines. Established in 1940 in Brisbane, it moved to Melbourne in 1945, and became an editorially independent imprint of Melbourne University Publishing. A print edition is produced quarterly, while it is updated continuously online. Publication of Meanjin was to cease at the end of 2025, but was instead acquired by the Queensland University of Technology in 2026, returning it to Brisbane after 85 years.

== History ==
=== Origin ===
Established in Brisbane by Clem Christesen in 1940 as a literary magazine titled Meanjin Papers, and named for the Turrbal/Yagara word for land on which the city of Brisbane is located. In its first issue, released for Christmas 1940, Christesen introduced it:

Literature and art, poetry and drama do not spring into being at the word of command. Their life is a continuous process growing within itself, and its suppression is death. Therefore we determined to commence publication of the Meanjin Papers

The magazine Angry Penguins in its issue no. 4 gave a qualified commendation: "We Approve: Meanjin Papers", edited by Clem Christesen in Queensland. Here the spirit is willing but the flesh is weak."

=== Melbourne ===
It moved to Melbourne in 1945 at the invitation of the University of Melbourne. Artist and patron Lina Bryans opened the doors of her Darebin Bridge House to the Meanjin group: then Vance and Nettie Palmer, Rosa and Dolia Ribush, Jean Campbell, Laurie Thomas, and Alan McCulloch. There they joined the moderates in the Contemporary Art Society (Norman Macgeorge, Clive Stephen, Isobel Tweddle and Rupert Bunny, Sybil Craig, Guelda Pyke, Elma Roach, Ola Cohn and Madge Freeman, and George Bell). Bryans created a free circle and was able to give the liberal, conservative modernist position in Melbourne a more vital character and a freer base than it would otherwise have had.

The magazine was renamed Meanjin in 1947, then to Meanjin Quarterly in 1961, and became Meanjin again in 1976.

In 1971, the magazine was selling approximately 2,000 copies of each issue. This had dropped to 1,800 in 2000, and to 1,400 copies in 2001, but rose again to 2,000 by 2007 according to editor Ian Britain, while a separate estimate suggested the true number was closer to 800. Between 2004 and 2008, Meanjin claimed to circulate approximately 2,000 copies of each issue through subscriptions and book store sales, including subscriptions held by 500 libraries in Australia and an additional 300 libraries overseas.

Since 2008 Meanjin has been published as an editorially independent imprint of Melbourne University Publishing (MUP).

=== Planned cessation ===
In September 2025, Melbourne University Publishing announced a controversial decision to cease publication of Meanjin at the end of 2025, but to retain its website and an online archive. Editor Esther Anatolitis and production editor Eli McLean were made redundant. The then chair of MUP, Warren Bebbington, claimed the decision to close was made on "purely financial grounds". This was received with scepticism in light of the journal's recent $100,000 grant from Creative Australia. Bebbington denied the claim that the journal was closed because of an article by Max Kaiser in 2024 in which he characterised antisemitism not as "eternal hatred" but as a phenomenon of racism in the context of Australia's foundational white supremacy ideology.

=== Return to Brisbane ===
In February 2026, the Queensland University of Technology (QUT) announced that it had acquired Meanjin with the intention to restart publication. The ownership agreement committed to maintaining editorial independence through an independent editorial board.

== Description ==
Meanjin was one of Australia's longest-running literary magazines. (Note: Hermes, published by the University of Sydney Union, was established in 1886, but has not been published continuously; Southerly was first published in September 1939.) For the first two years it was issued on a bi-monthly basis, and later in 1944 was published as a larger quarterly work with approximately 4,000 circulation.

A scholarly, peer-reviewed journal, it "manag[ed] to be serious and playful at once". Subjects included philosophy, poetry, fiction, essays, memoirs, and other forms of writing, and also produces podcasts. A print edition was produced quarterly. The online edition is updated on a daily basis.

== Notable contributors ==
The magazine has been the vehicle for important new work by Australian writers A. D. Hope, James McAuley, Douglas Stewart, Judith Wright, Patrick White, Randolph Stow, Joan London, Frank Moorhouse, Sarah Holland-Batt, Ellen van Neerven, and Les Murray. Special issues have been devoted to Joseph Furphy and Vance Palmer, among others.

== Editors ==
- 1940–1974: Clem Christesen
- 1974–1982: Jim Davidson
- 1982–1987: Judith Brett
- 1987–1994: Jenny Lee
- 1994–1998: Christina Thompson
- 1998–2001: Stephanie Holt
- 2001–2008 Ian Britain
- 2008–2011 Sophie Cunningham
- 2011–2012 Sally Heath
- 2013–2015 Zora Sanders
- 2015–2022 Jonathan Green
- 2022–2025 Esther Anatolitis

During Christina Thompson's editorship, in 1995 Cassandra Pybus was guest editor for Issue 2, titled O Canada. It features both Canadian and Australian writing including an essay by Gerry Turcotte, a Canadian writer teaching at the University of Wollongong and co-editor of Australia Canada Studies. During Esther Anatolitis's editorship, in 2023 Eugenia Flynn (Larrakia and Tiwi) and Bridget Caldwell-Bright (Jingle and Mudburra) were guest editors of the journal's first-ever all Aboriginal and Torres Strait Islander edition, Meanjin 82.3, Spring 2023.

== Poetry editors ==
- mid-to-late 1970s: Kris Hemensley
- 1979–1982: Judith Rodriguez
- 1987–1994: Philip Mead
- 1994–1997: Laurie Duggan
- 1998: Brian Henry
- 1998–2000: Coral Hull
- 2000–2005: Peter Minter
- 2005–2015: Judith Beveridge
- 2015–2023: Bronwyn Lea
- 2023–present: Jeanine Leane
