= Judith Beveridge =

Australian poet, editor and academic (born 1956)

- Occupations: Poet, editor and academic
- Writing career
- Language: English

Judith Beveridge (born 3 August 1956) is a contemporary Australian poet, editor and academic. She is a recipient of the Christopher Brennan Award.

== Biography ==
Judith Beveridge was born in London, England, arriving in Australia with her parents in 1960. She started her education at the Auburn North Public School in September 1961, and graduated in 1968 as dux (a title awarded to the student with best aggregate result over all subjects). Completing a BA at UTS she has worked in libraries, teaching, as a researcher and in environmental regeneration. From 2003 until 2018, she taught creative writing at the University of Sydney and was poetry editor for Meanjin from 2005 to 2015, having previously edited Hobo and the Australian Arabic literature journal Kalimat.

== Awards and nominations ==
- 1988 – Mary Gilmore Award for The Domesticity of Giraffes
- 1988 – New South Wales Premier's Literary Awards, Kenneth Slessor Prize for Poetry for The Domesticity of Giraffes
- 1988 – Victorian Premier's Literary Award, C. J. Dennis Prize for Poetry for The Domesticity of Giraffes
- 1997 – Wesley Michel Wright Prize
- 2003 – The Josephine Ulrick Poetry Prize
- 2004 – Queensland Premier's Literary Awards, Poetry Collection – Arts Queensland Judith Wright Calanthe Award for Wolf Notes
- 2005 – winner of the Philip Hodgins Memorial Medal at the Mildura Writer's Festival
- 2013 – Christopher Brennan Award
- 2015 – Peter Porter Poetry Prize
- 2015 – New South Wales Premier's Literary Awards, shortlisted, Kenneth Slessor Prize for Poetry for Devadatta's Poems.
- 2019 – Prime Minister's Literary Awards for Poetry for Sun Music
- 2023 – Australian Catholic University Prize for Poetry for "Two Houses"
- 2025 – Lifetime Achievement award, Creative Australia

== Bibliography ==
- The Domesticity of Giraffes (Black Lightning, 1987) ISBN 0-949561-08-8
- A Parachute of Blue: First Choice of Australian Poets. Number One, with Jill Jones (poet) & Louise Katherine Wakeling (Round Table Publications, 1995) ISBN 0-646-22003-9
- Accidental Grace (UQP, 1996) ISBN 0-7022-2872-9
- How to Love Bats, and Other Poems (Picaro Press, 2001) OCLC: 57312733
- Wolf Notes (Giramondo, 2003) ISBN 1-920882-00-6
- The Best Australian Poetry 2006, with Martin Duwell & Bronwyn Lea (UQP, 2006) ISBN 0-7022-3568-7
- Storm and Honey (Giramondo, 2009) ISBN 978-1-920882-56-3
- Devadatta's Poems (Giramondo, 2014) ISBN 978-1-922146-52-6
- Sun Music: New and Selected Poems (Giramondo, 2018) ISBN 978-1-925336-88-7
- Tintinnabulum, (Giramondo, 2024) ISBN 978-1-923106-05-5

== Articles ==
- Beveridge, Judith. (2001). Four Ascetics, The Literary Review, 45, no. 1, (2001): 152
