= The Oxford Book of Australian Women's Verse =

1995 Australian poetry anthology

- Author: Susan Lever
- Language: English
- Genre: Poetry collection
- Publisher: Oxford University Press
- Publication date: 1995
- Publication place: Australia
- Media type: Print
- Pages: 259 pp
- ISBN: 0195535057

The Oxford Book of Australian Women's Verse is a anthology of poems by Australian women poets edited by Susan Lever, published by Oxford University Press in 1995.

The anthology contains 252 poems from 89 authors.

== Background ==
In her introduction editor Susan Lever mentioned previous anthologies of Australian women's poetry – Mother I'm Rooted: An Anthology of Australian Women Poets edited by Kate Jennings published in 1975 and The Penguin Book of Australian Women Poets edited by Susan Hampton and Kate Llewellyn published in 1986 – and noted that the time seemed appropriate for another such anthology given that so "many Australian women poets have been publishing and receiving critical attention in the past ten years that they can no longer be considered marginalised." Lever considered that the time was now right for an updated collection "that enables readers to see recent women's poetry in the context of women's writing since white settlement."

Lever then went to on explain that this "collection includes poetry published in English and written by women born or living in Australia, spanning the period from 1838 (the publication date of Eliza Hamilton Dunlop's poem) to the present. While it has the aim of all good anthologies–to publish poetry that the editor believes will delight readers–it also tries to represent the full range of women's poetry and illustrate the changes in literary taste that make different styles flourish or disappear in each generation."

== Contents ==
- "Recollections", Fidelia S. T. Hill
- "The Aboriginal Mother", Eliza Hamilton Dunlop
- "The Song of Australia", Caroline Carleton
- "Wild Flowers of Australia", Caroline Carleton
- "The Prisoners' Hospital, Van Diemen's Land", Caroline W. Leakey
- "Our Darling's Lover", Clarinda Parkes
- "The Physical Conscience", Ada Cambridge
- "A Wife's Protest", Ada Cambridge
- "London", Ada Cambridge
- "Ordained", Ada Cambridge
- "From the Clyde to Braidwood", Emily Manning
- "The Two Beaches : Manly", Emily Manning
- "Where the Pelican Builds Her Nest", Mary Hannay Foott
- "In the Land of Dreams", Mary Hannay Foott
- "'King Jimmy' (Colonial Idyll of the King)", Honora Frances Kelly
- "Coming Home", Louisa Lawson
- "A Pound a Mile", Louisa Lawson
- "By the Blue Lake of Mount Gambier", Catherine Martin
- "Aboriginal Themes", Mary Gilmore
- "Never Admit the Pain", Mary Gilmore
- "The Hunter of the Black", Mary Gilmore
- "Nationality", Mary Gilmore
- "Fourteen Men", Mary Gilmore
- "The Lesser Grail", Mary Gilmore
- "Crows", Mary E. Fullerton
- "Vandal", Mary E. Fullerton
- "War Time", Mary E. Fullerton
- "Comet", Mary E. Fullerton
- "Body", Mary E. Fullerton
- "Passivity", Mary E. Fullerton
- "Sydney Harbour (New Year's Eve, 1897)", Mary E. Richmond
- "Reveille", Marie E. J. Pitt
- "The Reiver", Marie E. J. Pitt
- "Australia's Tommy Atkins (Written for the `Socialist', No Apology to William Hamilton)", Marie E. J. Pitt
- "Autumn in Tasmania", Marie E. J. Pitt
- "The Clan Call", Marie E. J. Pitt
- "Sund'y", Sydney Partrige
- "Capitalism", Sydney Partrige
- "The Circus Lion", Mabel Forrest
- "Chaperones", Mabel Forrest
- "The Other Side", Mabel Forrest
- "Kassaptu : (The Assyrian Witch)", Mabel Forrest
- "The First Night in Sydney Harbour (January 26th, 1788)", J. L. Ranken
- "The Left Behinds", Sumner Locke
- "Flood", Ethel Anderson
- "Fire", Ethel Anderson
- "War", Ethel Anderson
- "Sleeping Soldier", Ethel Anderson
- "Divorce", Anna Wickham
- "The Marriage", Anna Wickham
- "The Mountain Gully", Nettie Palmer
- "The Barrack Yard", Nettie Palmer
- "My Country", Dorothea Mackellar
- "Love Sonnets : XVII", Zora Cross
- "Night-Ride", Zora Cross
- "Sonnets of Motherhood XIX", Zora Cross
- "Sonnets of Motherhood XXXI", Zora Cross
- "Messalina", Dulcie Deamer
- "The Young Martyr", Dulcie Deamer
- "I Can't Feel the Sunshine", Lesbia Harford
- "Periodicity", Lesbia Harford
- "Street Scene - Little Lonsdale St", Lesbia Harford
- "[Untitled]", Lesbia Harford
- "Indictment", Elsie Clarice Cole
- "To the Main Roads Board", Rickety Kate
- "Before Kosciusko", Rickety Kate
- "Overtones on Australia Day", Mary Finnin
- "The Farm Near Norman's Lane", Mary Finnin
- "Winter Upland", Mary Finnin
- "Christmas, They Say", Dorothy Drain
- "News of a Baby", Elizabeth Riddell
- "To Stay Alive", Elizabeth Riddell
- "The Time of Life", Elizabeth Riddell
- "Here Lies", Elizabeth Riddell
- "The Grey Man", Margaret Diesendorf
- "To Break My Solitude", Margaret Diesendorf
- "Only the Gods Can Hear the Moan", Margaret Diesendorf
- "Reading an Erotic Novel at a Late Age", Barbara Giles
- "A Careful Childhood", Barbara Giles
- "Mama's Little Girl", Barbara Giles
- "Midnight Snow", Vera Newsom
- "Woman to Man", Judith Wright
- "At Cooloolah", Judith Wright
- "To Another Housewife", Judith Wright
- "Request to a Year", Judith Wright
- "Australia 1970", Judith Wright
- "Wedding Photograph, 1913", Judith Wright
- "For a Pastoral Family : To My Brothers", Judith Wright
- "For a Pastoral Family : To My Generation", Judith Wright
- "For a Pastoral Family : For Today", Judith Wright
- "For a Pastoral Family : Pastoral Lives", Judith Wright
- "For a Pastoral Family : Change", Judith Wright
- "For a Pastoral Family : Kinship", Judith Wright
- "A Problem of Language", Dorothy Auchterlonie
- "Motel Dining-Room", Helen Haenke
- "Autobiography : Pear Tree", Helen Haenke
- "River Scene", Nancy Cato
- "The Lovers", Nancy Cato
- "Mallee Farmer", Nancy Cato
- "School Cadets", Anne Elder
- "The Bachelor", Anne Elder
- "At Haworth", Anne Elder
- "In a Cafe", Rosemary Dobson
- "The Bystander", Rosemary Dobson
- "Child with a Cockatoo", Rosemary Dobson
- "Cock Crow", Rosemary Dobson
- "The Three Fates", Rosemary Dobson
- "Daily Living : Visiting", Rosemary Dobson
- "Who?", Rosemary Dobson
- "Daisy Bindi", Oodgeroo Noonuccal
- "Gifts", Oodgeroo Noonuccal
- "Dawn Wail for the Dead", Oodgeroo Noonuccal
- "Last of His Tribe", Oodgeroo Noonuccal
- "No More Boomerang", Oodgeroo Noonuccal
- "Ebb-Tide", Francis Geyer
- "Carnal Knowledge I", Gwen Harwood
- "Carnal Knowledge II", Gwen Harwood
- "Barn Owl", Gwen Harwood
- "Nightfall", Gwen Harwood
- "Return of the Native", Gwen Harwood
- "Lamplight", Gwen Harwood
- "Bone Scan", Gwen Harwood
- "The Lonely Fire", Nan McDonald
- "The Mountain Road: Crete, 1941 (for Bill)", Nan McDonald
- "Sleep", Nan McDonald
- "The Hawk", Nan McDonald
- "Our Mother Land", Daisy Utemorrah
- "Black Man", Daisy Utemorrah
- "Cicada Song", Nancy Keesing
- "Detective Story", Nancy Keesing
- "In Moncur Street", Dorothy Hewett
- "Miss Hewett's Shenanigans", Dorothy Hewett
- "Madame Bovary", Dorothy Hewett
- "Anniversary", Dorothy Hewett
- "Owl", Dorothy Hewett
- "For the Glory of God and of Gwendoline", Dorothy Hewett
- "The Page will Not Contain You", Grace Perry
- "Leaving the House", Grace Perry
- "Don't Be Too Polite, Girls!", Glen Tomasetti
- "Isaac Babel's Fiddle Reaches the Indian Ocean", Fay Zwicky
- "Summer Pogrom", Fay Zwicky
- "Chicken", Fay Zwicky
- "Tiananmen Square June 4, 1989", Fay Zwicky
- "Soup and Jelly", Fay Zwicky
- "Report from the Mid-Century Mark", Jennifer Strauss
- "The Snapshot Album of the Innocent Tourist", Jennifer Strauss
- "A Mother's Day Letter: Not for Posting", Jennifer Strauss
- "Polishing the Step", Margaret Scott
- "Doing the Washing", Margaret Scott
- "Cleaning Windows", Margaret Scott
- "Proteus", Margaret Scott
- "A Walk on the Beach",Margaret Scott
- "The Promised Land", Antigone Kefala
- "Sunday Visit", Antigone Kefala
- "Barbecue", Antigone Kefala
- "Five Poems on Memory", Judith Rodriguez
- "Family", Judith Rodriguez
- "Mudcrab at Gambaro's", Judith Rodriguez
- "The Baby, with the Bath-Water, Thrown Out", J. S. Harry
- "A Shot of War", J. S. Harry
- From "The Life on Water and the Life Beneath: 2", J. S. Harry
- "[Untitled] (from The Life on Water and the Life Beneath)", J. S. Harry
- "Chorus and Protagonists", J. S. Harry
- "Peri's Farm (for Jerry Rogers)", Kate Llewellyn
- "The Well", Jan Owen
- "Straw", Jan Owen
- "The Blue Gown", Jan Owen
- "Leaves", Jan Owen
- "The Pomegranate Tree", Jan Owen
- "Forever the Snake", Jennifer Rankin
- "Song", Jennifer Rankin
- "Love Affair 36", Jennifer Rankin
- "Old Currawong", Jennifer Rankin
- "The Dressing Shed", Lee Cataldi
- "Kuukuu Kardiya and the Women Who Live on the Ground", Lee Cataldi
- "Your Body", Lee Cataldi
- "Boston Tea Party", Wendy Poussard
- "Testaments (1945-55) : Frank", Caroline Caddy
- "Foreign Aid", Caroline Caddy
- "Genetics", Joanne Burns
- "Lung Lexicon", Joanne Burns
- "Conviction: A Transcript", Joanne Burns
- "Incipit Vita Nova (Again) (for Helen)", Alison Clark
- "Reclaiming the Feminine", Alison Clark
- "The Pool", Diane Fahey
- "The Chinese Astronomer", Diane Fahey
- "Dressmaker", Diane Fahey
- "Monopoly", Roberta Sykes
- "Fallin'", Roberta Sykes
- "One Day", Roberta Sykes
- "Black Woman", Roberta Sykes
- "The Excrement Cart", Lily Brett
- "Poland", Lily Brett
- "The Parsees", Jeri Kroll
- "The Tourists", Jeri Kroll
- "Grandmother", Susan Afterman
- "Soldier Boy", Susan Afterman
- "Profiles of My Father", Rhyll McMaster
- "My Mother and I Become Victims of a Stroke : Residues", Rhyll McMaster
- "My Mother and I Become Victims of a Stroke : Junk", Rhyll McMaster
- "The Menstruation Blues : Chorus", Robyn Archer
- "Summer Icebox", Pamela Brown
- "Shaky Days", Pamela Brown
- "Going Down. With no Permanence", Vicki Viidikas
- "The Country as an Answer", Vicki Viidikas
- "In the Kitchens : Stockton", Susan Hampton
- "Ode to the Car Radio", Susan Hampton
- "Inside the Skyscrapers", Susan Hampton
- "Space Invaders", Jennifer Maiden
- "In the Gloaming", Jennifer Maiden
- "Turning the Bulls Around", Jennifer Maiden
- "Static", Vicki Raymond
- "Laundromat", Vicki Raymond
- "An Episode of the Class Struggle (A Brechtian Interlude)", Vicki Raymond
- "Open Day, Highgate Cemetery", Vicki Raymond
- "Chat Show", Vicki Raymond
- "Night Piece : Freycinet Peninsula", Vicki Raymond
- "Confessional", Edith Speers
- "After Illness, Grace Notes : Eyeing the Blade", Jean Kent
- "After Illness, Grace Notes : No Don Quixote in Sight", Jean Kent
- "Clerical Assistant", Jean Kent
- "The Abattoir", Ania Walwicz
- "The Fountain", Ania Walwicz
- "From the Lambing to the Wool", Judy Small
- "Mothers, Daughters, Wives", Judy Small
- "Wunjo", Dorothy Porter
- "P.M.T.", Dorothy Porter
- "Nefertiti Rides Me", Dorothy Porter
- "Money for Nothing" (from The Monkey's Mask), Dorothy Porter
- "How Poems Start" (from The Monkey's Mask), Dorothy Porter
- "Self Portrait in a Mirror", Debbie Westbury
- "Albatross Road", Debbie Westbury
- "Fox in a Tree Stump", Judith Beveridge
- "The Lyre Birds", Judith Beveridge
- "Hannibal on the Alps", Judith Beveridge
- "Not Like a Wife", Gig Ryan
- "If I Had a Gun", Gig Ryan
- "Let's Get Metaphysical", Gig Ryan
- "Poem", Gig Ryan
- "Disinformation", Gig Ryan
- "Table Laid for One", Sarah Day
- "Kissing the Bubbl", Sarah Day
- "Plenary", Sarah Day
- "Sealing the Deal", Dipti Saravanamuttu
- "Like Yeast in Bread", Dipti Saravanamuttu
- "Songs of a Quiet Woman", Alison Croggon
- "Lindy", Alison Croggon
- "Wanna be White", Charmaine Papertalk-Green
- "Killing Delilah", Tracy Ryan
- "City Girl", Tracy Ryan
- "Black Swans in St James's Park", Jemal Sharah
- "Pastoral", Jemal Sharah

== Critical reception ==
In his review of this, and another Australian anthology, in The Times Literary Supplement, Clive James noted that this anthology "is unburdened by didactic jargon and makes commendably little fuss about the necessarily agonizing problem of getting everybody in without leaving too many good poems out." He notices that some poems are written by Australian expatriates though he finds that each is "an Australian poem wherever it was written."

Ian Davis, in The Canberra Times, concluded his review by stating "Lever's anthology has done a valuable job in bringing not only such classics as "Woman to Man" yet again to our attention but also a swag of almost forgotten poems which remind us that the Australian poetic tradition (male and female) is much more complex than we might think if we read only the standard anthologies."

The Cambridge History of Australian Literature called this anthology one of the "landmarks in the affirmation of a collective notion of women's poetry in Australia."

The Oxford Literary History of Australia, in comparing this book with the other anthologies of Australian women's poetry noted that with "a stronger historical consciousnessness, Lever's is a more relaxed anthology, less driven to publish experimental work and covering a wider range of voices."

== See also ==
- 1995 in Australian literature
