= The New Oxford Book of Australian Verse =

1986 poetry anthology edited by Les Murray

New Oxford Book of Australian Verse
- 3rd edition cover
- Author: Les Murray (editor)
- Cover artist: Joseph Jurra Tjapaltjarri
- Language: English
- Subject: Poetry anthology
- Publisher: Oxford University Press
- Publication date: 1986
- Publication place: Australia
- Media type: Print
- Pages: 438
- ISBN: 978-0-19-553994-3
- OCLC: 36556974
- Dewey Decimal: 821.008/0994 21
- LC Class: PR9615.25 .N49 1996

The New Oxford Book of Australian Verse is a major anthology of Australian poetry edited by the poet Les Murray. It was first published in 1986 and since has been expanded twice.

The anthology gives a broad view of Australian poetry. It ranges in time from Indigenous Australian oral poetry composed before colonisation up to the late twentieth century. Except for dates it is without the contextualising apparatus of biographies and annotations: "The absence of notes and other prose apparatus is intended to focus attention solely on the poetry, and to leave room for more of." Another uncommon feature is the inclusion of Indigenous oral poems, which are attributed in the book to the language group of their sources.

== Selected contents ==
- "Kangaroo" – Barron Field
- "A Convict's Tour to Hell" – Francis MacNamara
- "Bell-Birds" – Henry Kendall
- "Beyond Kerguelen" – Henry Kendall
- "The Woman at the Washtub" – Victor Daley
- "The Travelling Post Office" – A. B. ('Banjo') Paterson
- "When Your Pants Begin to Go" – Henry Lawson
- "The Farmer Remembers the Somme" – Vance Palmer
- "Click Go the Shears" – Unknown
- "Five Bells" – Kenneth Slessor
- "Mapooram" – Roland Robinson
- "Leopard-Skin" – Douglas Stewart
- "Because" – James McAuley
- "We Are Going" – Oodgeroo Noonuccal
- "A Simple Story" – Gwen Harwood
- "The Year of the Foxes" – David Malouf

== Other poets in The New Oxford Book of Australian Verse ==
Robert Adamson – Allen Afterman – Alan Alexander – Marion Alexopoulos – Richard James Allen – Ethel Anderson – Joan Aronsten – Dorothy Auchterlonie – Awabakal people – Lex Banning – Bruce Beaver – Judith Beveridge – John Blight – Barcroft Boake – Francis Brabazon – E. J. Brady – J. J. Bray – Christopher Brennan – John Le Gay Brereton – Doris Brett – R. F. Brissenden – Vincent Buckley – Ada Cambridge – David Campbell – Gary Catalano – Marcus Clarke – Hal Colebatch – Laurence Collinson – Jennifer Compton – William W. Coxon – Julian Croft – Alison Croggon – Harry Cummins – Jack Davis – R. R. Davidson – Arthur Davies – Bruce Dawe – C. J. Dennis – James Devaney – Rosemary Dobson – Michael Dransfield – John Dunmore Lang – Max Dunn – Geoffrey Dutton – Will Dyson – Ted Egan – Louis Esson – Steve Evans – Diane Fahey – Mary Finnin – Robert D. FitzGerald – Conal Fitzpatrick – John Foulcher – John Forbes – David Foster – Mary Eliza Fullerton ('E') – Katherine Gallagher – Silvana Gardner – Leon Gellert – Barbara Giles – Mary Gilmore – Peter Goldsworthy – W. T. Goodge – Alan Gould – Paul L. Grano – Jamie Grant – Robert Gray – Gumaitj people – Robin Gurr – Rodney Hall – Philip Hammial – Susan Hampton – Lyn Hard – Lesbia Harford – W. E. Harney – Charles Harpur – Max Harris – J. S. Harry – Kevin Hart – P. J. Hartigan (John O'Brien) – William Hart-Smith – Dennis Haskell – Nicholas Hasluck – Charles W. Hayward – Kristen Henry – Graeme Hetherington – Paul Hetherington – Dorothy Hewett – A. D. Hope – Robert Harris – Philip Hodgins – Harry Hooton – Barry Humphries – Rex Ingamells – Clive James – Kate Jennings – Martin Johnston – Evan Jones – Kamilaroi people – Nancy Keesing – John Kinsella – Andy Kissane – Peter Kocan – C. J. Koch – Grandfather Koori – Martin Langford – Eve Langley – Andrew Lansdown – Louis Lavater – Anthony Lawrence – Joyce Lee – Geoffrey Lehmann – Francis Letters – Jack Lindsay – Kate Llewellyn – Robert Lowe – Frederick Macartney – Hugh McCrae – Ronald McCuaig – Nan McDonald – Roger McDonald – Jack McGuire – Gordon Mackay-Warna – Dorothea Mackellar – Kenneth Mackenzie – Rhyll McMaster – David McNicoll – Jennifer Maiden – John Manifold – Frederic Manning – David Martin (Ludwig Detsinyi) – Philip Martin – Ray Mathew – Furnley Maurice (Frank Wilmot) – Harley Matthews – Philip Mead – Louisa Meredith – Miidhu – Sam Mitchell – E. G. Moll – Linda Molony – Rod Moran – Ian Mudie – Les Murray – E. G. Murphy ('Dryblower') – T. H. Naisby – Smiler Narautjarri – Narranyeri people – John Shaw Neilson – Nunggubuyu people – Mark O'Connor – Bernard O'Dowd – E. J. Overbury – Jan Owen – Geoff Page – Pambardu – Charmaine Papertalk-Green – Grace Perry – J. A. Phelp – John Philip – Hal Porter – Peter Porter – Craig Powell – Pudjipangu – Jennifer Rankin – Vicki Raymond – Alan Riddell – Elizabeth Riddell – Nigel Roberts – Judith Rodriguez – Eric Rolls – David Rowbotham – John Rowland – Gig Ryan -Philip Salom – Andrew Sant – John A. Scott – Margaret Scott – W. N. Scott – Thomas Shapcott – Jemal Sharah – Michael Sharkey – Charles Shaw – Dunstan Shaw – Craig Sherborne – R. A. Simpson – Peter Skrzynecki – Vivian Smith – Edith Speers – Peter Steele – James Brunton Stephens – Harold Stewart – Billy Marshall Stoneking – Randolph Stow – Maurice Strandgard – Jennifer Strauss – Norman Talbot – Andrew Taylor – Charles R. Thatcher – Colin Thiele – Richard Tipping – Tjinapirrgarri – John Tranter – W. J. Turner – David Unaipon – Rod Usher – Brian Vrepont (B. A. Trubridge) – Robert Walker – Chris Wallace-Crabbe – Francis Webb – Richard Whately – B. R. Whiting – Lauren Williams – Amy Witting – Wolaroi people – Wonguri-Mandjigai people – Sam Woolagoodjah – Judith Wright – Fay Zwicky

== Publishing history ==
- The New Oxford Book of Australian Verse (OUP, 1986) ISBN 0-19-5546180
- The New Oxford Book of Australian Verse (OUP, 1991) ISBN 0-19-5533623
- The New Oxford Book of Australian Verse (OUP, 1996) ISBN 0-19-553994-X
