= The Penguin Book of Australian Women Poets =

1986 Australian poetry anthology

- Author: Susan Hampton and Kate Llewellyn (editors)
- Language: English
- Genre: Poetry collection
- Publisher: Penguin
- Publication date: 1986
- Publication place: Australia
- Media type: Print
- Pages: 293 pp
- ISBN: 0140585753

The Penguin Book of Australian Women Poets is an anthology of poems by Australian women poets edited by Susan Hampton and Kate Llewellyn, published by Penguin Books in 1986.

The anthology contains 212 poems from 89 authors.

== Contents ==
- "Wudal-Maimai Song Sequence : Untitled", unknown
- "North-Eastern Arnhem Land", Caroline Berndt
- "The Female Transport", unknown
- "Desire", Ada Cambridge
- "Vows", Ada Cambridge
- "What?", Mary Gilmore
- "The Woman", Mary Gilmore
- "Awakened", Mary Gilmore
- "All or Nothing (The Kiss)", Mary Gilmore
- "Marri'd", Mary Gilmore
- "Honing up the Hill", Mary Gilmore
- "Old Botany Bay", Mary Gilmore
- "Gadgets", Mary E. Fullerton
- "Puppets", Mary E. Fullerton
- "Threads", Mary E. Fullerton
- "Lion", Mary E. Fullerton
- "Humility", Mary E. Fullerton
- "Three Satires", Ethel Anderson
- "The Sick Assailant", Anna Wickham
- "Note on Rhyme", Anna Wickham
- "The Fired Pot", Anna Wickham
- "The Marriage", Anna Wickham
- "Two Japanese Songs : 1 : The Heart of a Bird", Dorothea Mackellar
- "Two Japanese Songs : 2 : A Smoke Song", Dorothea Mackellar
- "Arms and the Woman", Dorothea Mackellar
- "My Country", Dorothea Mackellar
- "Thou Shalt Not", Zora Cross
- "Love Sonnets : X", Zora Cross
- "Fatherless", Lesbia Harford
- "Sometimes I Think the Happiest of Love's Moments", Lesbia Harford
- "You Want a Lily", Lesbia Harford
- "The Invisible People", Lesbia Harford
- "Skirt Machinist", Lesbia Harford
- "I Can't Feel the Sunshine", Lesbia Harford
- "Periodicity", Lesbia Harford
- "Via the Bridge", Rickety Kate
- "My Sister...", Olive Hopegood
- "Breaking Drought", Mary Finnin
- "Native-Born", Eve Langley
- "Occasions of Birds", Elizabeth Riddell
- "Personal Notices", Elizabeth Riddell
- "Kauri", Elizabeth Riddell
- "Bricks", Vera Newsom
- "Fireworks and Champagne", Barbara Giles
- "Learning All the Words in the World (for Fabian [Faby], Aged Two)", Barbara Giles
- "Miriol", Joyce Lee
- "Dreams for Wheat", Joyce Lee
- "Lament for the Drowned Country", Mary Durack
- "At a Poetry Conference, Expo 1967", Judith Wright
- "Stillborn", Judith Wright
- "Letter", Judith Wright
- "Report of a Working Party", Judith Wright
- "The Trap", Judith Wright
- "Eve to Her Daughters", Judith Wright
- "Halfway", Judith Wright
- "A Problem of Language", Dorothy Auchterlonie
- "Present Tense", Dorothy Auchterlonie
- "Mallee Farmer", Nancy Cato
- "Day's Ending", Nancy Cato
- "Writers and War : 1 : In Memory of Dietrick Bonhoeffer", Madge Staunton
- "Crazy Woman", Anne Elder
- "Seen Out", Anne Elder
- "The Night She Explored Her Psyche", Nancy Gordon
- "No More Boomerang", Oodgeroo Noonuccal
- "Gifts", Oodgeroo Noonuccal
- "We Are Going", Oodgeroo Noonuccal
- "Ballad of the Totems", Oodgeroo Noonuccal
- "The Eye", Rosemary Dobson
- "Good Friday, Boston", Rosemary Dobson
- "Child with a Cockatoo", Rosemary Dobson
- "Captain Svenson", Rosemary Dobson
- "The Nightmare", Rosemary Dobson
- "An Address to my Muse", Gwen Harwood
- "Night Thoughts : Baby and Demon", Gwen Harwood
- "'I Am the Captain of My Soul'", Gwen Harwood
- "Carnal Knowledge II", Gwen Harwood
- "Suburban Sonnet : Boxing Day", Miriam Stone
- "Mid-Channel", Gwen Harwood
- "I Died Yesterday", Nora Krouk
- "This Time", Dorothy Hewett
- "Anniversary", Dorothy Hewett
- "Fourth Exile's Letter", Dorothy Hewett
- "The Three Ring Circus", Nancy Keesing
- "Female Spider - Spider Female", Nancy Keesing
- "Orchard : Neighbour Woman on the Fencing Wire", Elizabeth Jolley
- "Jonah's Wife", Jill Hellyer
- "Waiting for the Birth", Grace Perry
- "Mrs Noah Speaks", Fay Zwicky
- "The Poet Puts it Away", Fay Zwicky
- "Guenevere Dying", Jennifer Strauss
- "Grandchild", Margaret Scott
- "The Black Swans", Margaret Scott
- "Freedom Fighter", Antigone Kefala
- "Passengers to the City", Katherine Gallagher
- "Concerning Native Fauna", Katherine Gallagher
- "How Do You Know It's the Right One?", Judith Rodriguez
- "The Letter from America"", Judith Rodriguez
- "Eskimo Occasion", Judith Rodriguez
- "Mudcrab at Gambaro's : The Mudcrab-Eatersr", Judith Rodriguez
- "Black and White, Mostly White", Judith Rodriguez
- "Bivalve", Judith Rodriguez
- "Towards Fog", Judith Rodriguez
- "The Tenth Muse", Sylvia Kantaris
- "Package for the Distant Future", Sylvia Kantaris
- "XXII (from News from the Front)", Sylvia Kantaris
- "XXIV (from News from the Front)", Sylvia Kantaris
- "Travelogue", Sylvia Kantaris
- "Annunciation", Sylvia Kantaris
- "Muse", Jean Talbot
- "The Gulf of Bothnia", J. S. Harry
- "Subjective Around Lismore", J. S. Harry
- "Uncle with Currawongs", J. S. Harry
- "The Poem Films Itself", J. S. Harry
- "The Day We Lost the Volkswagen", Rosemary Nissen-Wade
- "O", Kate Llewellyn
- "The Kites", Kate Llewellyn
- "Breasts", Kate Llewellyn
- "Eve", Kate Llewellyn
- "Swimming Instructor", Jan Owen
- "Ice - Oh!", Jan Owen
- "I Had a Room", Jennifer Rankin
- "Evening and All That Jazz", Lee Cataldi
- "Shadow Ape", Silvana Gardner
- "Why We didn't Go Away on the Long Weekend", Colleen Burke
- "Call Around and See Us", Colleen Burke
- "I Feel Lousy", Colleen Burke
- "Mornings : 3", Alexandra Seddon
- "Testaments (1945-55) : Lenny", Caroline Caddy
- "Black Woman", Roberta Sykes
- "Love Poems : I", Roberta Sykes
- "My Mother and the Trees", Christine Churches
- "Union Jacks", Stefanie Bennett
- "Real Land", Joanne Burns
- "Stacking It : Another Suicide : On the Death of Anne Sexton", Joanne Burns
- "[Untitled]", Joanne Burns
- "Reading", Joanne Burns
- "The Parsees", Jeri Kroll
- "Bushfire Weather", Jeri Kroll
- "The Quoc Bird", Thuy Ai Nguyen Thi and Dao Nguyen and Susan Hampton
- "A Festive Poem", Rhyll McMaster
- "Wanderings", Laraine Roche
- "You Try to Get Out of the Fear", Carol Novack
- "The Staircase", Carol Novack
- "Tuscan Dream", Beate Josephi
- "Drawing the Fruit", Anna Couani
- "What a Man, What a Moon", Anna Couani
- "The Train", Anna Couani
- "The Map of the World", Anna Couani
- "Poem", Anna Couani
- "Inside of Paradise", Vicki Viidikas
- "A Trunkful of Structures", Vicki Viidikas
- "It's Natural", Vicki Viidikas
- "Going Down. With no Permanence", Vicki Viidikas
- "Rehabilitation", Vicki Viidikas
- "One for Patti Smith", Pamela Brown
- "The Red Cocacola Bottle", Pamela Brown
- "Honky Tonk Sunset", Pamela Brown
- "[Untitled]", Pamela Brown
- "[Untitled]", Pamela Brown
- "Leaving", Pamela Brown
- "The Dear John Letter", Pamela Brown
- "Couples", Kate Jennings
- "One Kiss Too Many", Kate Jennings
- "Why I Like Men", Edith Speers
- "Yugoslav Story", Susan Hampton
- "Stranded in Paradise", Susan Hampton
- "Statues", Susan Hampton
- "The Trust : Part One", Jennifer Maiden
- "The Trust : Part Two", Jennifer Maiden
- "The Trust : Part Three", Jennifer Maiden
- "The Trust : Part Four", Jennifer Maiden
- "The Trust : Part Five", Jennifer Maiden
- "Genesis" /Take 2", Elaine Golding
- "Blkfern - Jungal", Aileen Corpus
- "Taxi Conversation", Aileen Corpus
- "To the Ironing-Board", Jean Kent
- "Daredevil", Ania Walwicz
- "Little Red Hiding Hood", Ania Walwicz
- "Leaving", Ania Walwicz
- "Marcel Proust", Ania Walwicz
- "Australia", Ania Walwicz
- "Modern Ballroom Dancing", Ania Walwicz
- "Admiring the Handiwork", Jenny Boult
- "Scene", 'Thalia'
- "Against Noise (After a Poetry Reading)", Wendy Jenkins
- "Definition Poem : Pissed as a Parrot", Chris Mansell
- "Lady Gedanke Writes to the Painter", Chris Mansell
- "Dialogue", Chris Mansell
- "[Untitled]", Dorothy Porter
- "The Red Sports Car Afternoon", Dorothy Porter
- "Scenes from a Marriage : V", Dorothy Porter
- "Trial Separation : I", Dorothy Porter
- "Juds Park", Anne Lloyd
- "If I Had a Gun", Gig Ryan
- "Not Like a Wife", Gig Ryan
- "Cruising", Gig Ryan
- "His Cubist Drawings", Gig Ryan
- "The Domesticity of Giraffes", Judith Beveridge
- "Making Perfume", Judith Beveridge
- "Streets of Chippendale", Judith Beveridge
- "My Name", Judith Beveridge
- "Ghoul", Anne Brewster
- "Greenhouse Tomatoes", Sarah Day
- "Check Mate", Isabel Hartman
- "Romance", Amanda Stewart
- "It Becomes : July 1981", Amanda Stewart
- "A Flash of Green", Kate Lilley
- "Fabula", Kate Lilley
- "Statistic for the New World", Dipti Saravanamuttu
- "The Dummies", Lucinda Castaldi
- "Wanna be White", Charmaine Papertalk-Green
- "Breaking the Drought", Anna Munster

== Critical reception ==
After lamenting the lack of women poets in a number of then-contemporary Australian poetry anthologies Helen Thompson in Australian Book Review noted that this anthology "flings down the gauntlet, as it were, with a gender-specific survey, challenging categorisation based on genre or theme." She went on to comment that "gender-specific collections of writing such as this one does make possible a contrasting ‘centring’ of female experience which demands assessment on its own terms."

Reviewing the anthology for The Age Literary Review Anne Diamond stated: "The collection's feminist challenge to the male dominance in Australian poetry lies in the diversity of its own vested interests; the acknowledged plurality of feminism represented by the differing positions of migrant, Aboriginal, lesbian and colonial women in Australian history. Although this is the anthology's strongest feature it is also a necessary compromise; in one sense, the book attempts a politics of plurivocality with the basic empirical assumptions of the anthology form itself."

The Oxford Literary History of Australia said, of the anthology, that the editors' "focus was on poetry as well as on politics, and the work is of a high standard, with a particular emphasis, perhaps reflecting the editors' own taste, on satire."

The Cambridge History of Australian Literature called this anthology a landmark "in the affirmation of a collective notion of women's poetry in Australia."

== See also ==
- 1986 in Australian literature
