= 1966 in Australian literature =

This article presents a list of the historical events and publications of Australian literature during 1966.

== Events ==
- Australia decimalised its currency on 14 February 1966, with the Australian dollars replacing the Australian pound. Australian writer and poet Henry Lawson was featured on the back side of the new $10 note.

== Major publications ==
=== Books ===
- James Aldridge
  - My Brother Tom
  - The Statesman's Games
- Jon Cleary
  - The High Commissioner
  - The Pulse of Danger
- Peter Cowan – Seed
- Sumner Locke Elliott – Some Doves and Pythons
- Elizabeth Harrower – The Watch Tower
- Shirley Hazzard – The Evening of the Holiday
- Morris Lurie – Rappaport
- Peter Mathers – Trap
- Christina Stead – Dark Places of the Heart
- Arthur Upfield – The Lake Frome Monster
- Judah Waten – Season of Youth
- Patrick White – The Solid Mandala

=== Short stories ===
- James Hackston – Father Clears Out
- Elizabeth Harrower – "The Beautiful Climate"
- D'Arcy Niland – Pairs and Loners
- Judith Wright – The Nature of Love

=== Children's and Young Adult fiction ===
- Mavis Thorpe Clark – The Min-Min
- Max Fatchen – The River Kings
- Elyne Mitchell – Silver Brumby Kingdom
- Ruth Park
  - The Muddle-Headed Wombat at School
  - The Muddle-Headed Wombat in the Snow
- Joan Phipson – The Crew of the Merlin
- Judith Wright – The River and the Road

=== Poetry ===
- Vincent Buckley – Arcady and Other Places : Poems
- Bruce Dawe – "The Not-So-Good Earth"
- William Hart-Smith – The Talking Clothes: Poems
- Dorothy Hewett – "Legend of the Green Country"
- A. D. Hope – Collected Poems 1930 - 1965
- Les Murray – "Evening Alone at Bunyah"
- Oodgeroo Noonuccal
  - The Dawn is at Hand
  - "Gifts"
  - "No More Boomerang"
- Judith Wright
  - "Eve to Her Daughters"
  - "Naked Girl and Mirror"
  - The Other Half : Poems

=== Biography ===
- Hal Porter – The Paper Chase
- Clement Semmler – Kenneth Slessor

=== Non-Fiction ===
- Geoffrey Blainey – The Tyranny of Distance

== Awards and honours ==
=== Literary ===
Award	Author	Title	Publisher
ALS Gold Medal	A. D. Hope		
Miles Franklin Award	Peter Mathers	Trap	Cassell

=== Children and Young Adult ===
Award	Category	Author	Title	Publisher
Children's Book of the Year Award	Older Readers	Ivan Southall	Ash Road	Angus and Robertson
Children's Book of the Year Award	Picture Book	No award		

=== Poetry ===
Award	Author	Title	Publisher
Grace Leven Prize for Poetry	William Hart-Smith	The Talking Clothes: Poems	Angus and Robertson

== Births ==
A list, ordered by date of birth (and, if the date is either unspecified or repeated, ordered alphabetically by surname) of births in 1966 of Australian literary figures, authors of written works or literature-related individuals follows, including year of death.

- 3 June – Kate Forsyth, novelist
- 10 October – Andrew McGahan, novelist (died 2019)
- 17 November – Nikki Gemmell, novelist

Unknown date

- Delia Falconer, novelist
- Anna Funder, novelist
- Malcolm Knox, novelist

== Deaths ==
A list, ordered by date of death (and, if the date is either unspecified or repeated, ordered alphabetically by surname) of deaths in 1966 of Australian literary figures, authors of written works or literature-related individuals follows, including year of birth.

- 16 April – Eric Lambert, novelist (born 1918)
- 28 May – Edward Harrington, bush balladist and short story writer (born 1896)
- 18 August – Myra Morris, author and poet (born 1893)

== See also ==
- 1966 in Australia
- 1966 in literature
- 1966 in poetry
- List of years in Australian literature
- List of years in literature
