= Jenny (schooner) =

Legendary 18th century schooner

The Jenny was an alleged English schooner and the subject of an unproven legend. The story goes that the Jenny became frozen in an ice-barrier of the Drake Passage in 1823, only to be rediscovered in 1840 by a whaling ship, the bodies aboard being preserved by the Antarctic cold. The original report has been deemed unsubstantiated. (Note: Robert K. Headland, in his book Chronological list of Antarctic expeditions and related historical events, writes that "There is no corroborative evidence for this event.")

The earliest known source for the story appears to be an article in the Wiener Zeitung published on 19 February 1841. In the following weeks, the same text was printed in at least seven other newspapers.

On the occasion of the McClintock Arctic expedition, the story of the schooner Jenny was remembered again: for example, in an anonymous article in an 1862 edition of Globus, a popular German geographical magazine.

== Account ==
The supposed account describes how the ship left its home port on the Isle of Wight in 1822. The ship was discovered frozen in ice in the Drake Passage by a Captain Brighton of the whaler Hope in September 1840. The log had been entered until 17 January 1823. The last port of call had been Callao, near Lima, Peru. Brighton took the logbook with him in order to return it to the shipowners.

== Influence ==
The Jenny is commemorated by the Jenny Buttress, a feature on King George Island near Melville Peak, named by the UK Antarctic Place-Names Committee in 1960.

Australian poet Rosemary Dobson wrote about the story in her poem "The Ship of Ice" published in her book The Ship of Ice with other poems in 1948, which won the Sydney Morning Herald award for poetry that year. Dobson's poem places the discovery of the Jenny in 1860, adding 20 years to the period of entrapment. The poem speaks of her as a "ship caught in a bottle / [....] / Becalmed in Time and sealed with a cork of ice". According to Dobson, her source was the anonymous report The Drift of the Jenny, 1823–1840.
