= In Certain Circles =

Book by Elizabeth Harrower

- Author: Elizabeth Harrower
- Language: English
- Genre: Literary fiction
- Publisher: Text Publishing
- Publication date: 2014
- Publication place: Australia
- Media type: Print
- Pages: 256 pp
- ISBN: 9781922182296
- Preceded by: The Watch Tower
- Followed by: –

In Certain Circles is an Australian novel by Elizabeth Harrower. Though the novel was written sometime in the late 1960s and early 1970s, it was not published until 2014 when it became her first novel published in 48 years. It helped to spur a revival of interest in her body of work.

== Plot ==
The novel is about the lives of two sets of siblings, the privileged Howard siblings Russell and Zoe, who are the children of elite Australian botanists, and the Quayle siblings Stephen and Anna who were orphaned at a young age and raised by an uncle consumed with caring for his mentally-ill wife.

Russell and Stephen meet by accident on a train and later Russell invites Stephen and his sister to spend time with him and his family. Zoe is immediately struck by Stephen's condescending attitude and his refusal to kowtow to her demands. Believing him to be hyper-intelligent, she is shocked to discover he works as a salesman. Anna, who is shy, develops a crush on Russell. However, Russell is engaged, soon marries, and moves to Europe with his new bride shortly after meeting the Quayle siblings. Stephen leaves Sydney for Melbourne around the same time after receiving a promotion. Zoe graduates from high school and moves to Paris to work in photography and film.

Anna meanwhile stays behind in Sydney and gains independence working in an office. She stays in contact with the Howard family and eventually marries an acquaintance of theirs who is much older than she, and with whom she is not in love, only to be widowed shortly after.

When Zoe is 25 she returns to Sydney after the death of her mother, just missing seeing her alive by a day. She reconnects with Stephen and after a short and passionate courtship the two marry. Despite her life being in Paris she decides to stay in Sydney, ignoring the warnings of her friends and family that life there won't suit her.

Stephen and Russell go into business together running a left-wing political paper. Because of the now deep ties between the Howard and Quayle families, Anna and Russell are able to spend more time together and fall in love, though there is a tacit understanding between them that their relationship cannot be expressed.

Fifteen years later when Zoe is 40 she reflects back on how her marriage has changed her to an insecure and unhappy woman. She no longer feels passionately in love with Stephen and feels that their relationship exists on the basis of him criticizing her. Meanwhile, Russell's wife Lily falls into a depression after her twin daughters win ballet scholarships to study in London. After talking to Zoe, Lily decides that they should sell their business and she should return to academia, the career she wanted to pursue before she had children. They decide to announce the news at Lily's birthday party, however on the day of the party Zoe receives a suicide note from Anna saying that she and Russell are in love and she can no longer bear to live without him.

Russell goes to look for Anna and Zoe is left to comfort Lily, who realizes that her marriage is over. Unable to find Anna, the siblings contact the police only to be called by Stephen shortly after who informs them that Anna is with him. Anna later reveals that the suicide note was written years earlier and was accidentally sent instead of the Christmas cards she intended to post.

After seeing how Russell and Anna intend to be together and how Lily is forging a new life going to London to be closer to her daughters, Stephen and Zoe sit down and discuss the state of their marriage and their unhappiness together. Stephen tells Zoe he wants to return to school and get an advanced degree in chemistry and urges Zoe to return to her work in film. No longer having career ambitions that way, Zoe nevertheless feels that a new chapter of her life is about to begin.

== Publication history ==
Harrower wrote the novel after receiving a Commonwealth Literary Fund fellowship in 1968. However, she was not satisfied with the result and called the act of writing it "forced labour".

In 1971, shortly before it was to be published, Harrower withdrew the book from publication. She deposited the completed novel with the National Library of Australia and stopped writing entirely.

In 2012 Harrower was approached by Michael Heyward and Penny Hueston, editors of the independent press Text Publishing, who wanted to reprint her works. They attempted to persuade Harrower to publish In Certain Circles and she eventually acquiesced, allowing the novel to be published in 2014.

== Reception ==
The novel received positive reviews upon publication. The Guardian called the work "subtle yet wounding, and very much alive", praising it as "a graceful reply to the questions of what really shapes us, and what might actually constitute a wasted life." The Wall Street Journal called the novel "a treasure from an unearthed time capsule" and praised Harrower as "one of the great Australian writers of the postwar era."

In 2015 it won the Voss Literary Prize for best novel published in 2014.
