= The Other Half : Poems =

Poetry collection by Judith Wright

- Author: Judith Wright
- Language: English
- Publisher: Angus and Robertson
- Publication date: 1966
- Publication place: Australia
- Media type: Print (hardback)
- Pages: 51p
- Preceded by: Selected Poems
- Followed by: The Nature of Love

The Other Half : Poems (1966) is the ninth collection of poetry by Australian poet Judith Wright.

The collection consists of 38 poems, some with their original publication in this book, and some of which were had been previously published in magazines such as The Australian, The London Magazine, The Bulletin, The Times Literary Supplement, and various Australian poetry collections.

== Contents ==
- "The Other Half"
- "To Hafiz of Shiraz"
- "The Curtain"
- "Metamorphosis"
- "Destruction"
- "Imago"
- "To Another Housewife"
- "The Encounter"
- "Against the Wall"
- "Power"
- "City Sunrise"
- "Pro and Con"
- "Wishes"
- "For Jack Blight"
- "Beside the Creek"
- "The Real Dream"
- "The Trap"
- "Homecoming"
- "Prayer"
- "Sculpture"
- "Cleaning Day"
- "Clock and Heart"
- "To a Mare"
- "Eve to Her Daughters"
- "Remembering an Aunt"
- "For John Shaw Neilson"
- "The Young Wife"
- "Typists in the Phoenix Building"
- "Child with a Dead Animal"
- "Naked Girl and Mirror"
- "Water"
- "The Beanstalk, Meditated Later"
- "A Document"
- "Camping at Split Rock"
- "Snakeskin on a Gate"
- "New Guinea Legend: The Finding of the Moon"
- "Portrait"
- "Turning Fifty"

== Critical reception ==
In The Canberra Times Dorothy Green put this collection in context with the rest of Wright's work: "From her first book to this, the most recent, Judith Wright has wrestled with one of the most baffling of human problems: the problem of reconciling the active and the contemplative, the sense and the spirit, the event and the concept of the event, or whatever names are given to the dualities of human consciousness."

Reviewing the collection for The Age newspaper Dennis Douglas noted that "the most interesting feature of [the poems] is the ability to breathe human life into abstractions, to give intellectual probings great emotional warmth, so that a real level of communication is achieved between writer and reader." He went on that the "experience of reading this poetry is profoundly emphatic one."

== See also ==
- 1966 in literature
- 1966 in Australian literature
