= Trap (novel) =

1966 novel by Peter Mathers

- First edition
- Author: Peter Mathers
- Language: English
- Genre: Novel
- Publisher: Cassell, Australia
- Publication date: 1966
- Publication place: Australia
- Media type: Print (Hardback)
- Preceded by: –
- Followed by: The Wort Papers

Trap (1966) is the first novel by Australian author Peter Mathers. It won the Miles Franklin Award for 1966.

== Story outline ==
The novel follows the life of Jack Trap, a man living on the outskirts of Melbourne in the 1960s. Trap is of mixed Irish, English and Aboriginal background, in his forties and fat. He joins with a small group of outsiders and travels to a mining lease on Cape York to form a co-operative community.

== Critical reception ==
In The Canberra Times Maurice Dunlevy found that the attempted satire fell well short of its target: "Trap is a first novel and reads like one. It attempts to be satirical, shocking and avant garde — succeeds only in being naive...His irony is too heavy, his targets are too obvious and he never cuts deeper than satirical revue."

Roger Milliss in the Tribune (Sydney), found "The style is often reminiscent of that of Patrick White's admittedly not-very-edifying satires of suburbia. And, dealing as it does with the aboriginal question (if Mr. Mathers' complex theme can be summed up so inadequately), it possesses some generic connections with a whole stream of our writing, from Coonardoo on."

== Publication history ==
Following the novel's initial publication by Cassell in 1966, the book was published as follows:

- 1970 Sphere, UK
- 1978 Nelson, Australia
- 2003 Sydney University Press, Australia

== See also ==
- 1966 in Australian literature
