= Child with a Cockatoo =

1949 poem by Rosemary Dobson

- by Rosemary Dobson
- Country: Australia
- Language: English
- Publisher: Meanjin vol. 8 no. 3 Spring 1949
- Publication date: 1949
- Lines: 41

"Child with a Cockatoo" is a 1949 poem by Australian poet Rosemary Dobson.

It was first published in Meanjin in Spring 1949 and later in several of the author's poetry collections and a number of other Australian poetry anthologies.

== Outline ==
This poem is an example of ekphrastic poetry, where a poet writes about a visual work of art. In this case the work of art is a portrait of Anne Russell, the Duke of Bedford's daughter, painted about 1655, by Dutch-born artist Simon Verelst. The unusual aspect of this painting is the depiction of a young girl with a sulphur-crested cockatoo in the 1650s, well before the arrival of Eurpoean colonisers on the Australian mainland.

== Critical reception ==
The Oxford Companion to Australian Literature notes that the author's collection Child with a Cockatoo, and Other Poems contains a group of fifteen 'Poems from Paintings', this poem being one of them. The Companion then goes on to state that Dobson "beleives that in these celebrated paintings, where suspended moment of life are eternally captured, lies the triumph of art over time."

In an essay titled "The Post-war Golden Generation, 1945–1965", published in The Cambridge History of Australian Literature, Toby Davidson notes that this poem "critiques European exoticism...where the bird is reduced to a mere colonial souvenir instead of 'an old adventurer'".

== Further publications ==
After its initial publication in Meanjin in 1949 the poem was reprinted as follows:

- Jindyworobak Anthology edited by Nancy Cato, 1950
- Australian Poetry 1949-50 edited by Rosemary Dobson, Angus and Robertson, 1950
- New Song in an Old Land edited by Rex Ingamells, Longmans Green, 1954
- Child with a Cockatoo, and Other Poems by Rosemary Dobson, Angus and Robertson, 1955
- Selected Poems by Rosemary Dobson, Angus and Robertson, 1973
- The Jindyworobaks edited by Brian Elliott, University of Queensland Press, 1979
- The Collins Book of Australian Poetry edited by Rodney Hall, Collins, 1981
- Cross-Country : A Book of Australian Verse edited by John Barnes and Brian MacFarlane, Heinemann, 1984
- The Penguin Book of Australian Women Poets edited by Susan Hampton and Kate Llewellyn, Penguin, 1986
- Two Centuries of Australian Poetry edited by Mark O’Connor, Oxford University Press, 1988
- Collected Poems by Rosemary Dobson, Angus and Robertson, 1991
- Australian Poetry in the Twentieth Century edited by Robert Gray and Geoffrey Lehmann, Heinemann, 1991
- The Oxford Book of Australian Women's Verse edited by Susan Lever, 1995
- Macquarie PEN Anthology of Australian Literature edited by Nicholas Jose, Kerryn Goldsworthy, Anita Heiss, David McCooey, Peter Minter, Nicole Moore, and Elizabeth Webby, Allen and Unwin, 2009
- Australian Poetry Since 1788 edited by Geoffrey Lehmann and Robert Gray , University of NSW Press, 2011

== Note ==
- The painting, which is the subject of this poem, is described as "A finely painted portrait of a child, apparently of noble birth, her left hand resting on a cockatoo. From always having been a favourite picture with the possessors, there can be little doubt of its representing one of the Russell family; and to none of these is it so likely to apply as to Anne, sole daughter of Edward, fourth son of William, earl of Bedford, by his wife Frances, daughter of Sir Robert Williams, of Penrhyn."
- A poor reproduction of the painting can be seen in the volume Life in a Noble Household 1641–1700 by Gladys Scott Thomson.

== See also ==
- 1949 in poetry
- 1949 in literature
- 1949 in Australian literature
- Australian literature
