= We Are Going =

Poetry collection by Oodgeroo Noonuccal

- Author: Oodgeroo Noonuccal
- Language: English
- Genre: Poetry collection
- Publisher: Jacaranda Press
- Publication date: 1964
- Publication place: Australia
- Media type: Print
- Pages: 43 pp

We Are Going (1964) is a collection of poems by Australian writer Oodgeroo Noonuccal. It was published by Jacaranda Press in 1964.

The collection includes 29 poems by the author, from a variety of original sources. This is the first collection of poems by Oodgeroo Noonuccal (originally published as by "Kath Walker").

== Contents ==
- "Aboriginal Charter of Rights"
- "My Love"
- "Colour Bar"
- "Son of Mine"
- "I Am Proud"
- "Namatjira"
- "The Dispossessed"
- "The Teachers"
- "Then and Now"
- "White Man, Dark Man"
- "Corroboree"
- "Cookalingee"
- "Stone Age"
- "Freedom"
- "We Are Going"
- "Tree Grave"
- "United We Win"
- "The Bunyip"
- "Gooboora, the Silent Pool"
- "Dawn Wail for the Dead"
- "Acacia Ridge"
- "The Unhappy Race : The Myall Speaks"
- "Whynot Street"
- "White Australia"
- "The Protectors"
- "Intolerance"
- "Let Us Not Be Bitter"
- "An Appeal"
- "A Song of Hope"

== Dedication ==
- "Dedicated with pride to all the members of the Federal Council of Aboriginal and Torres Strait Islanders Advancement, whose motto is : 'All human beings are born free and equal in dignity and rights...and should act towards one another in a spirit of brotherhood.' (Article 1. Declaration of Human Rights)"

== Critical reception ==
Writing in the Sydney Tribune reviewer Jim Henderson called the collection a "battle cry", and stated: "No one with a spark of humanity in their make-up will remain unmoved after reading Kath Walker's book of poems We Are Going...The racists won't like it, the cattle barons who make money out of the exploitation of the colored stockmen will find it distasteful, but the ordinary Australian democrat will hail it...The book is in the genuine Australian tradition of Lawson and Co., and, though unique in that it is the first ever by an Australian Aboriginal, it can stand on its own feet as literature."

== Publication history ==
After the book's initial publication by Jacaranda Press in 1964, it was then published as follows:

- Citadel Press, USA, 1965
- Jacaranda Press, Australia, 1964

The book was also translated into Italian in 2013.

== See also ==
- 1964 in Australian literature

== Notes ==
- The collection contains a foreword by James Devaney.
