= If I Had a Gun (poem) =

1980 poem by Australian poet Gig Ryan

- by Gig Ryan
- Written: 1980
- First published in: The Division of Anger : Poems by Gig Ryan
- Country: Australia
- Language: English
- Lines: 58

"If I Had a Gun" (1980) is a poem by Australian writer Gig Ryan. It was originally published in the author's first collection of poetry, The Division of Anger : Poems, and later included in a number of Australian poetry anthologies.

== Critical reception ==
Reviewing the anthology The Penguin Book of Australian Women Poets, where this poem is reprinted, Anne Diamond comments that this poem "measures the idiom of the privileged, middle-class male– blue-tac chic – against the aggressive, fractured telling of women's common-place experience."

Writing about Ryan's poetry in Bridgings : Readings in Australian Women's Poetry, Rose Lucas and Lyn McCredden contend that the "anger and vitriol that bursts through in poems such as 'If I Had a Gun', need not only be interpreted as a simple, and thus unproductive, reversal of a victim/victimiser dichotomy. Such anger may be the only means available, or perceived to be available, to attempt to short that closed circuit or stereotyped gender expectations."

== Publishing history ==
After its initial publication in The Division of Anger : Poems in 1980 the poem was reprinted as follows:

- Off the Record edited by Pi O, Penguin, 1985
- The Penguin Book of Australian Women Poets edited by Susan Hampton and Kate Llewellyn, Penguin, 1986
- Contemporary Australian Poetry: An Anthology edited by John Leonard, Houghton Mifflin, 1990
- The Penguin Book of Modern Australian Poetry edited by John Tranter and Philip Mead, Penguin, 1991
- The Sting in the Wattle : Australian Satirical Verse edited by Philip Neilsen, University of Queensland Press, 1993
- The Oxford Book of Australian Women's Verse edited by Susan Lever, Oxford University Press, 1995
- Bridgings : Readings in Australian Women's Poetry edited by Rose Lucas and Lyn McCredden, Oxford University Press, 1996
- Macquarie PEN Anthology of Australian Literature edited by Nicholas Jose, Kerryn Goldsworthy, Anita Heiss, David McCooey, Peter Minter, Nicole Moore, and Elizabeth Webby, Allen and Unwin, 2009
- Australian Poetry Since 1788 edited by Geoffrey Lehmann and Robert Gray, University of NSW Press, 2011

== Notes ==
The full text of the poem is available on the Australian Poetry Library archived website.

== See also ==
- 1980 in Australian literature
- 1980 in poetry
