= Down in the City =

1957 novel by Elizabeth Harrower

- First edition
- Author: Elizabeth Harrower
- Language: English
- Genre: Literary fiction
- Publisher: Cassell & Co (1957); Text Publishing (2013)
- Publication place: Australia
- Media type: Print
- Pages: 352 pp
- ISBN: 9781922147042
- Followed by: The Long Prospect

Down in the City is the 1957 debut novel by Australian writer Elizabeth Harrower. It is set in post-war Sydney and centers around the troubled marriage of a sheltered, privileged young woman to a destructive, egotistical male.

== Plot outline ==
Esther Prescott lives a sheltered, privileged life in a stone mansion at Sydney's harbourside Rose Bay. She is the only female member of her high-society family, and has seen little of life outside of her upper-class suburb. She meets the "flashy" self-made man Stan Peterson and the two are hastily married. After their wedding, Esther moves into a Kings Cross apartment with him; although charming in the beginning, he quickly reveals himself to be a tyrannical, egotistical drunk.

Their relationship is further complicated by nosy residents of the building, and the return of Stan's ex-girlfriend, Vivian. Prescott finds herself at somewhat of a crossroads–her passivity and stoic manner are tested when her married life begins to unravel at the hands of her obstreperous, manipulative and immoral husband.

== Themes ==
Down in the City deals with class divisions, opportunity, gender, marriage and domestic violence in post-war Sydney.

== Reception ==
The novel was first published in London and was well regarded at the time. Harrower had written it in her London flat after a bout of homesicknesses for Australia, particularly Sydney.

Like all of Harrower's other novels, it went out of print in its native Australia for a considerable period before being re-published by Text Publishing, as part of their Classics series, in October 2013. This edition contains an introduction by Delia Falconer.

Writing for The Australian, David Barrett stated that the novel "marked the arrival of one of the sharpest authors of psychological fiction in Australian literature. Many of the things that happen in the novel are unpleasant, but are rendered with such intensity and psychological insight that the experience of reading about them is thrilling. Harrower tells the truth about how it feels to suffer like Esther does, and to do so in a city as beautiful as Sydney". He further stated that despite the novel being about emotional abuse in a damaged marriage, the book was "a pleasure to read", like "beautiful little nightmares".

Tara Judah, writing for Readings in 2013, noted that the novel is "far more biting than the melodramatic premise might suggest", and further commented on the juxtaposition of its Australian and English culture: "the novel feels equally as interested in Englishness as it is in Australianness".
