= The Three Fates (poem) =

1978 poem by Rosemary Dobson

- by Rosemary Dobson
- Country: Australia
- Language: English
- Publisher: Antaeus, No. 30-31
- Publication date: 1978
- Lines: 15

"The Three Fates" is a poem by Australian poet Rosemary Dobson.

It was first published in Antaeus, No. 30-31 and later in two of the author's poetry collections and a number of other Australian poetry anthologies.

== Outline ==
The three Fates of Greek mythology allow the poem's protagonist to return to life and relive it. But he does not expect to do so backwards.

== Critical reception ==
In his commentary on the poem in 60 Classic Australian Poems Geoff Page called this a "deceptively simple poem". He then went on to explain that "Dobson has achieved an unusually distinctive tone in this poem and has a highly personal way with rhythm." He concluded that "the poem is more than the sum of its devices. They simply serve to provide aesthetic satisfaction and to make the poem's moral more memorable."

== Further publications ==
After its initial publication in Antaeus in 1978 the poem was reprinted as follows:

- Poet's Choice 1978 edited by Philip Roberts, Island Press, 1978
- New South : Australian Poetry of the Late 1970s : A Selection edited by David Brooks, Dreadnaught, 1980
- The Three Fates and Other Poems by Rosemary Dobson, Hale and Iremonger, 1984
- The Penguin Book of Modern Australian Poetry edited by John Tranter and Philip Mead, Penguin, 1991
- Collected Poems by Rosemary Dobson, Angus and Robertson, 1991
- The Oxford Book of Australian Women's Verse edited by Susan Lever, Oxford University Press, 1995
- 80 Great Poems from Chaucer to Now edited by Geoff Page, University of NSW Press, 2006
- 60 Classic Australian Poems edited by Geoff Page, University of NSW Press, 2009
- Love is Strong as Death edited by Paul Kelly, Hamish Hamilton, 2019

The poem was also translated into Arabic in 1999.

== See also ==
- 1978 in poetry
- 1978 in literature
- 1978 in Australian literature
- Australian literature
