= Gifts (poem) =

1966 poem by Australian poet Oodgeroo Noonuccal

- by Oodgeroo Noonuccal
- Written: 1966
- First published in: The Dawn is at Hand by Kath Walker
- Country: Australia
- Language: English
- Lines: 15

"Gifts" (1966) is a poem by Australian poet Oodgeroo Noonuccal.

It was originally published in the author's collection The Dawn is at Hand in 1966, under the name of "Kath Walker", and was subsequently reprinted in the author's single-author collections and a number of Australian poetry anthologies.

== Synopsis ==
The poem depicts the story of a tribal courtship in three parts. The first has a young man offering the girl jewellery, which she rejects. In the second he promises her a child, and a life with him as "headman, great rain-maker". Again she is "not impressed". Lastly he offers her poetry, that he will "steal for you the singing of all the birds". But she wants something more substantial and immediate.

== Critical reception ==
In his commentary on the poem in 60 Classic Australian Poems Geoff Page noted that "Like a European folk tale, the poem has an archetypal narrative structure...It's easy enough to imagine a story like this told in another culture, but to hear it narrated so convincingly within Aboriginal culture ensures mainstream Australian readers are more inclined to transcend the condescending prejudices they might previously have harboured."

== Publication history ==
After the poem's initial publication in The Dawn is at Hand in 1966 it was reprinted as follows:

- My People : A Kath Walker Collection by Kath Walker, Jacaranda Press, 1970
- The Penguin Book of Australian Women Poets edited by Susan Hampton and Kate Llewellyn, Penguin, 1986
- Contemporary Australian Poetry: An Anthology edited by John Leonard, Houghton Mifflin, 1990
- The Macmillan Anthology of Australian Literature edited by Ken L. Goodwin and Alan Lawson, Macmillan, 1990
- The Language of Love: An Anthology of Australian Love Letters, Poetry and Prose edited by Pamela Allardice, Angus and Robertson, 1991
- The Oxford Book of Australian Love Poems edited by Jennifer Strauss, Oxford University Press, 1993
- The Oxford Book of Australian Women's Verse edited by Susan Lever, Oxford University Press, 1995
- Australian Verse : An Oxford Anthology edited by John Leonard, Oxford University Press, 1998
- 60 Classic Australian Poems edited by Geoff Page, University of NSW Press, 2009
- The Puncher & Wattmann Anthology of Australian Poetry edited by John Leonard, Puncher & Wattmann, 2009
- Australian Poetry Since 1788 edited by Geoffrey Lehmann and Robert Gray, University of NSW Press, 2011
- Love is Strong as Death edited by Paul Kelly, Hamish Hamilton, 2019

== Note ==
- You can read the full text of the poem in Tharunka, the magazine of the Student's Union of the University of New South Wales

== See also ==
- 1966 in Australian literature
- 1966 in poetry
