= The Ship of Ice =

1946 Australian verse about Antarctica

- by Rosemary Dobson
- First published in: The Sydney Morning Herald
- Country: Australia
- Language: English
- Publication date: 15 February 1947

The Ship of Ice is a 1946 Australian verse about Antarctica by Rosemary Dobson.

According to one account "The story is of an English schooner, the Jenny, which sailed from Lima, Peru, in 1823 and was discovered 37 years later, frozen in an Antarctic ice pack. The skipper of a whaler, who discovered the long-missing ship, went on board and found the bodies of the captain, his wife, and members of the crew perfectly preserved."

It won the Sydney Morning Herald's 1946 Poetry Competition.

The poem was initially published in The Sydney Morning Herald on 15 February 1947.

The poem was later published in a collection of Dobson's work in 1948, titled The Ship of Ice : And Other Poems, and again, in the poet's Collected Poems in 1991.

== Radio version ==
The poem was produced on ABC radio in 1947. It was produced again in 1949.

== Author's note ==
"The English schooner Jenny, which left Callao, the port of Lima, in 1823, was locked in an ice-barrier of the Antarctic Circle for thirty-seven years. On 22 September 1860, the ice-barrier opened in front of the whaler Hope, revealing the frozen ship. Captain Brighton, of the Hope, went aboard the Jenny and found the bodies of the skipper, his wife, and the crew in a perfect state of preservation." - The Ship of Ice : With Other Poems by Rosemary Dobson, Angus and Robertson, 1948

== See also ==
- 1946 in Australian literature
