= We Are Going (poem) =

1962 poem by Australian poet Oodgeroo Noonuccal

- by Oodgeroo Noonuccal
- Written: 1962
- First published in: Tribune
- Country: Australia
- Language: English
- Publication date: 2 May 1962
- Lines: 25

"We Are Going" (1962) is a poem by Australian poet Oodgeroo Noonuccal.

It was originally published in the Tribune on 2nd May 1962, under the name of "Kath Walker", and was subsequently reprinted in the author's single-author collections and a number of Australian poetry anthologies.

== Synopsis ==
The poem is a warning that, with the spreading of the white people across the Australian countryside, "The eagle is gone, the emu and the kangaroo are gone" from the places that the Aboriginal people called home. Soon they will be gone as well.

== Critical reception ==
The Oxford Companion to Australian Literature included this in a list of the author's poems that displays "her nostalgia for the lost Aboriginal past [that] echoes the same note of loss and desolation that is present in Judith Wright's 'Bora Ring'."

== Publication history ==
After the poem's initial publication in Tribune in 1962 it was reprinted as follows:

- We Are Going : Poems by Kath Walker, Jacaranda Press, 1964
- New Impulses in Australian Poetry edited by Rodney Hall and Thomas Shapcott, University of Queensland Press, 1968
- My People : A Kath Walker Collection by Kath Walker, Jacaranda Press, 1970
- The Penguin Book of Australian Verse edited by Harry Heseltine, Penguin Books, 1972
- The Land's Meaning edited by L. M. Hannan and B. A. Breen, Macmillan, 1973
- Australian Verse from 1805 : A Continuum edited by Geoffrey Dutton, Rigby, 1976
- The Jindyworobaks edited by Brian Elliott, University of Queensland Press, 1979
- The Golden Apples of the Sun : Twentieth Century Australian Poetry edited by Chris Wallace-Crabbe, Melbourne University Press, 1980
- The Collins Book of Australian Poetry edited by Rodney Hall, Collins, 1981
- The New Oxford Book of Australian Verse edited by Les Murray, Oxford University Press, 1986
- The Penguin Book of Australian Women Poets edited by Susan Hampton and Kate Llewellyn, Penguin, 1986
- Cross-Country : A Book of Australian Verse edited by John Barnes and Brian MacFarlane, Heinemann, 1988
- Two Centuries of Australian Poetry edited by Mark O'Connor, Oxford University Press, 1988
- Contemporary Australian Poetry: An Anthology edited by John Leonard, Houghton Mifflin, 1990
- The Macmillan Anthology of Australian Literature edited by Ken L. Goodwin and Alan Lawson, Macmillan, 1990
- The Penguin Book of Modern Australian Poetry edited by John Tranter and Philip Mead, Penguin, 1991
- Spirit Song : A Collection of Aboriginal Poetry compiled Lorraine Mafi-Williams, Omnibus Books, 1993
- Oodgeroo by Kathleen J. Cochrane, University of Queensland Press, 1994
- The Arnold Anthology of Post-Colonial Literatures in English edited by John Thieme, Arnold, 1996
- The Oxford Book of Modern Australian Verse edited by Peter Porter, Oxford University Press, 1996
- Australian Verse : An Oxford Anthology edited by John Leonard, Oxford University Press, 1998
- Indigenous Australian Voices : A Reader edited by Jennifer Sabbioni, Kay Schaffer and Sidonie Smith, Rutgers University Press, 1998
- Macquarie PEN Anthology of Australian Literature edited by Nicholas Jose, Kerryn Goldsworthy, Anita Heiss, David McCooey, Peter Minter, Nicole Moore, and Elizabeth Webby, Allen and Unwin, 2009
- I Am Proud and Other Poems by Oodgeroo Noonuccal, Picaro Press, 2010
- Antipodes : Poetic Responses edited by Margaret Bradstock, Phoenix Education, 2011
- Australian Poetry Since 1788 edited by Geoffrey Lehmann and Robert Gray, University of NSW Press, 2011

== See also ==
- 1962 in Australian literature
- 1962 in poetry
