= To a Married Man =

1980 poem by Australian poet Kate Llewellyn

- by Kate Llewellyn
- Written: 1980
- First published in: Overland, July 1980
- Country: Australia
- Language: English
- Lines: 26

"To a Married Man" (1980) is a poem by Australian poet Kate Llewellyn.

It was originally published in Overland magazine in July 1980 and was subsequently reprinted in a number of Australian poetry anthologies.

== Synopsis ==
The main character of the poem is a woman who has tired of an affair she is having with a married man.

== Critical reception ==
In his commentary on the poem in 60 Classic Australian Poems Geoff Page noted that the poem "is a fine example of what can be done in free verse – and with the female colloquial voice in a certain register." Page also states that it "appears to tread a fine line between the confessional poem and the dramatic monologue."

== Publication history ==
After the poem's initial publication in Overland magazine it was reprinted as follows:

- New Poetry vol. 27 no. 4, 1980
- Trader Kate and the Elephants by Kate Llewellyn, 1982
- Off the Record edited by TT. O, 1985
- Selected Poems by Kate Llewellyn, 1992
- 60 Classic Australian Poems edited by Geoff Page, University of NSW Press, 2009
- Kate Llewellyn by Kate Llewellyn and Paul Sharrad, 2010

== See also ==
- 1980 in Australian literature
- 1980 in poetry
