= No More Boomerang =

1966 poem by Australian poet Oodgeroo Noonuccal

- by Oodgeroo Noonuccal
- Written: 1966
- First published in: The Dawn is at Hand
- Country: Australia
- Language: English
- Lines: 52

"No More Boomerang" (1966) is a poem by Australian poet Oodgeroo Noonuccal.

It was originally published in the author's poetry collection The Dawn is at Hand in 1966, and was subsequently reprinted in the author's single-author collections and a number of Australian poetry anthologies.

== Synopsis ==
The poet lists everything her people have lost since white colonisation in Australia. Each stanza contrasts a loss with what has been offered in return.

== Critical reception ==
In her commentary about the poem in her book of critical essays, Australian Classics : Fifty Great Writers and Their Celebrated Works, Jane Gleeson-White noted: "As the poem (with much humour) works through the range of inferior substitutes granted by Western culture, including the 'revolutionary' abstract art of Modernism in place of Aboriginal rock art, it shows that these new ways are not only meaningless and damaging to Aboriginal people, but are potentially destructive to all humanity, in the form of the atom bomb."

== Publication history ==
After the poem's initial publication in The Dawn is at Hand in 1966 it was reprinted as follows:

- My People : A Kath Walker Collection by Oodgeroo Noonuccal, Jacaranda Press, 1970
- Australian Voices : A Collection of Poetry and Pictures edited by Edward Kynaston, Penguin, 1974
- Poetry Speaks edited by Leone Peguero, Heinemann Education Australia, 1982
- The Penguin Book of Australian Humorous Verse edited by Bill Scott, Penguin, 1984
- The Penguin Book of Australian Women Poets edited by Susan Hampton and Kate Llewellyn, Penguin, 1986
- Kunapipi, vol. 10 no. 1-2, 1988
- Contemporary Australian Poetry: An Anthology edited by John Leonard, Houghton Mifflin, 1990
- The Macmillan Anthology of Australian Literature edited by Ken L. Goodwin and Alan Lawson, Macmillan, 1990
- The Penguin Book of Modern Australian Poetry edited by John Tranter and Philip Mead, Penguin, 1991
- The Sting in the Wattle : Australian Satirical Verse edited by Philip Neilsen, University of Queensland Press, 1993
- The Oxford Book of Australian Women's Verse edited by Susan Lever, Oxford University Press, 1995
- 50 Years of Queensland Poetry : 1940s to 1990s edited by Philip Neilsen and Helen Horton, Central Queensland University Press, 1998
- Australian Verse : An Oxford Anthology edited by John Leonard, Oxford University Press, 1998
- Australian Classics : Fifty Great Writers and Their Celebrated Works by Jane Gleeson-White, Allen and Unwin, 2007
- Macquarie PEN Anthology of Australian Literature edited by Nicholas Jose, Kerryn Goldsworthy, Anita Heiss, David McCooey, Peter Minter, Nicole Moore, and Elizabeth Webby, Allen and Unwin, 2009
- The Puncher & Wattmann Anthology of Australian Poetry edited by John Leonard, Puncher & Wattmann, 2009
- I Am Proud and Other Poems by Oodgeroo Noonuccal, Picaro Press, 2010
- Australian Poetry Since 1788 edited by Geoffrey Lehmann and Robert Gray, University of NSW Press, 2011

The poem was also translated into Indonesian in 1991.

== Note ==
- You can read the full text of the poem on a Victoria University site.
- In 1985 the Aboriginal Islander Dance Theatre's production Stomping Ground included a movement interpretation of the poem.
- Aboriginal rock band Coloured Stone included a version of this poem, set to music, on their 1985 album Island of Greed. You can listen to this song on YouTube.
- Australian musician Steve Cooney produced a musical interpretation of the poem for the 1988 album Never Underestimate the Power of a Song.

== See also ==
- 1966 in Australian literature
- 1966 in poetry
