= Eve to Her Daughters =

1966 poem by Australian poet Judith Wright

- by Judith Wright
- Written: 1966
- First published in: The Other Half : Poems
- Country: Australia
- Language: English
- Lines: 60

"Eve to Her Daughters" (1966) is a poem by Australian poet Judith Wright.

It was originally published in the author's collection The Other Half : Poems in 1966, and was subsequently reprinted in the author's single-author collections and a number of Australian poetry anthologies.

== Synopsis ==
Eve explains to her daughters her feelings about her and Adam's expulsion from the Garden of Eden, and how she sees the event and the outcomes very differently to Adam's viewpoint.

== Critical reception ==
In her review of the containing collection Dorothy Green in The Canberra Times noted: "She can dispense altogether with the controlling eye, with direct meditation, and set up a dramatic situation to probe a metaphysical problem, as in 'Eve to her Daughters', a poem that under its lightness of touch, is profound and horrifying."

== Publication history ==
After the poem's initial publication in The Other Half : Poems it was reprinted as follows:

- Poetry from Australia : Judith Wright, William Hart-Smith, Randolph Stow edited by Howard Sergeant, Pergamon Press, 1969
- Judith Wright : Collected Poems, 1942-1970 by Judith Wright, Angus and Robertson, 1971
- Journeys : Poems edited by Fay Zwicky, Sisters Publishing, 1982
- The Penguin Book of Australian Women Poets edited by Susan Hampton and Kate Llewellyn, Penguin, 1986
- A Human Pattern : Selected Poems by Judith Wright, Angus and Robertson, 1990
- Contemporary Australian Poetry: An Anthology edited by John Leonard, Houghton Mifflin, 1990
- The Sting in the Wattle : Australian Satirical Verse edited by Philip Neilsen, University of Queensland Press, 1993
- Collected Poems 1942-1985 by Judith Wright, Angus and Robertson, 1994
- Australian Verse : An Oxford Anthology edited by John Leonard, Oxford University Press, 1998
- 50 Years of Queensland Poetry : 1940s to 1990s edited by Philip Neilsen and Helen Horton, Central Queensland University Press, 1998
- Grace and Other Poems by Judith Wright, Picaro Press, 2009
- Macquarie PEN Anthology of Australian Literature edited by Nicholas Jose, Kerryn Goldsworthy, Anita Heiss, David McCooey, Peter Minter, Nicole Moore, and Elizabeth Webby, Allen and Unwin, 2009
- Motherlode : Australian Women's Poetry 1986-2008 edited by Jennifer Harrison and Kate Waterhouse, Puncher and Wattmann, 2009

== See also ==
- 1966 in Australian literature
- 1966 in poetry
