= Jenny Buttress =

Jenny Buttress (61°59′S 57°43′W) is a rock buttress 2.5 nautical miles (5 km) north of Melville Peak, overlooking Destruction Bay on the east side of King George Island, in the South Shetland Islands. It was named by the UK Antarctic Place-Names Committee in 1960 for the alleged sailing vessel Jenny from the Isle of Wight which was found drifting in Drake Passage by the whaler Hope in September 1840. All her crew were dead and the log was entered up to January 17, 1823.
