= The Talking Clothes: Poems =

Book by William Hart-Smith

The Talking Clothes : Poems
- First edition
- Author: William Hart-Smith
- Cover artist: Cedric Flower
- Language: English
- Genre: poetry collection
- Publisher: Angus and Robertson
- Publication date: 1966
- Publication place: Australia
- Media type: Print
- Pages: 96 pp
- Preceded by: Poems of Discovery
- Followed by: Mini-Poems

The Talking Clothes : Poems (1966) is the ninth poetry collection by Australian poet William Hart-Smith. It won the Grace Leven Prize for Poetry, in 1966.

The collection consists of 86 poems, some of which had been previously published in various Australian magazines and journals, and the rest of which are published for the first time in this volume.

== Contents ==
- "Fly"
- "Birth"
- "Jigsaw Puzzle"
- "The Castle"
- "Schoolboy"
- "Trafalgar"
- "On the Beach"
- "Death by Drowning"
- "Meeting"
- "Spirit-Child"
- "Cicadas - Sestina"
- "Hibiscus"
- "Aaron's Rod"
- "On Being Vulnerable"
- "Crickets"
- "Pattern on as Pavement"
- "The Talking Clothes"
- "Postage Stamp"
- "Scatterling"
- "Via Crucis"
- "Filius Matris"
- "Rock-Lizards"
- "St Francis"
- "St Anthony"
- "Journey from Gomorrah"
- "Termite Hill"
- "Candle"
- "Notes in Pencil"
- "Black Crow"
- "Nature Study"
- "Man in the Moon"
- "Observation"
- "Armageddon"
- "Visitor Macabre"
- "Recurrence"
- "Triolet"
- "Renovations"
- "Reasons"
- "Brief Apodosis on a Voyage of Discovery"
- "Ambrosia"
- "Man"
- "Mouse"
- "Otters"
- "Rhinoceros"
- "Golden Pheasant"
- "Mud Skipper"
- "Razor Fish"
- "Hunted Hare"
- "Death of a Swan"
- "Limpets"
- "Crabs"
- "Spiders"
- "Eloquence"
- "Leaves (1)"
- "Leaves (2)"
- "The Coming of the Flowers"
- "Galahs"
- "Triantelope"
- "Vapour Trail"
- "Seven Cows"
- "Bird in the Saucepan"
- "Heat - Outback"
- "The Dam"
- "Flies"
- "Honeysuckle"
- "Moth in the Rain"
- "Shivery Grass"
- "Cities are Inevitable"
- "Geologist"
- "Peruvian Rugs"
- "Sinbad"
- "The Castaways of Port Stephens"
- "Number"
- "Storms"
- "Boy with Bubble Pipe"
- "Untidiness"
- "Opposite Land"
- "The Jivaros"
- "Humpty Dumpty"
- "Spider and Fly"
- "Judas"
- "Praying Mantis"
- "Intellect"
- "Fishing : Russell, Bay of Islands"
- "A Folk Tale"
- "Man into Trees"

== Critical reception ==
Rodney Hall in The Bulletin notes that in this collection the poet "does not seem to be addressing the solitary reader, nor haranguing the crowd. He uses a middle voice, quiet yet public, as if talking to a small groups of friends and admirers." And concludes: "These poems, with their charm and compactness, make a cogent argument against the charge that all modern verse is obscure."

In The Age, in a combined review of seven poetry collections, Dennis Douglas opines that this collection places "the poet as a mediator between the reader and the world of phenomenal objects...The incursions of phenomena are precariously held at bay in Mr. Hart-Smith's collection by the lightness of tone in his work and the use of the poet as observer."

== Awards ==
- 1966 – Grace Leven Prize for Poetry winner

== See also ==
- 1966 in Australian literature
- 1966 in poetry
