= The Dawn is at Hand =

1966 Australian poetry collection by Kath Walker

- Author: Kath Walker
- Language: English
- Genre: Poetry collection
- Publisher: Jacaranda Press
- Publication date: 1966
- Publication place: Australia
- Media type: Print
- Pages: 49 pp

The Dawn is at Hand is a collection of poems by Australian poet Kath Walker, later known as Oodgeroo Noonuccal, published by Jacaranda Press in 1966.

The collection contains 30 original poems.

== Contents ==
- "Assimilation - No!"
- "Integration - Yes!"
- "The Dawn is at Hand"
- "Municipal Gum"
- "Bwalla the Hunter"
- "Civilisation"
- "Nona"
- "Jarri's Love Song"
- "Dark Unmarried Mothers"
- "The Curlew Cried"
- "Tribal Justice"
- "Bora"
- "Biami"
- "Daisy Bindi"
- "The Past"
- "No More Boomerang"
- "The Woor Woman"
- "Understand, Old One"
- "Sounds Assail Me"
- "The Food Gatherers"
- "The Young Girl Wanda"
- "Song"
- "Gifts"
- "God's One Mistake"
- "Ballad of the Totems"
- "Artist Son"
- "Last of His Tribe"
- "The Child Wife"
- "Community Rain Song"
- "Verses"

== Critical reception ==
Reviewing the collection in The Sydney Morning Herald Roland Robinson acknowledged that the poet's previous collection probably achieved some success due to the novelty of her Aboriginality, but he then states "there was an undeniable other reason. The author had something important to say and she said it directly and simply." He concluded that "She is a genuine voice speaking for her own people in place of the sympathetic white man speaking for them."

== Notes ==
- Dedication: For Patricia, Denis, and Vivian, whose patience, tolerance and sacrifice, enabled me to write these poems

== See also ==
- 1966 in Australian literature
