= Kate Llewellyn =

Australian poet and nonfiction writer

Kate Llewellyn AM
- Born: 15 January 1936; Tumby Bay, South Australia
- Occupations: Poet and author
- Writing career
- Notable awards: 1982 Anne Elder Award, joint winner

Kate Llewellyn AM (born 15 January 1936) is an Australian poet, author, diarist and travel writer.

== Biography ==
Eldest of four children of Ron and Ivy Brinkworth (née Shemmald), Llewellyn was born Kathleen Jill Brinkworth in 1936 in Tumby Bay on Eyre Peninsula, South Australia. Llewellyn trained at the Royal Adelaide Hospital, graduating as a registered nurse in 1958.

In 1960 she married Richard Llewellyn, with whom she had two children, including Caro Llewellyn. The couple divorced in 1972.

From 1965 to 1972 she owned and directed the Llewellyn Galleries, Dulwich, Adelaide and from 1971 to 1972 the Bonython Galleries, North Adelaide. She graduated from the University of Adelaide with a BA in history and classics in 1978. Llewellyn worked on the Unley Planning Study 1978 and in 1979 worked in the Women's Advisory Unit of the SA Premier's Department.

She was also involved in the Poets Union.

Llewellyn began writing as an undergraduate. In addition to her poetry, she has written book reviews, criticisms and essays for Australian poetry and prose anthologies, magazines and newspapers and also on travel, gardening, food and people.

Llewellyn is a regular speaker at writers' festivals, including the 2015 Adelaide Writers' Week. She has also taught creative writing courses and been writer-in-residence at a number of colleges, universities and writers' centres across Australia.

== Recognition ==
Australian Writers, 1975–2000 (one volume of the Dictionary of Literary Biography published by Thomson Gale, 2002-6) edited by Selina Samuels includes a biography of Llewellyn by Dorothy Jones.

In 2005 Llewellyn received a Literature Board Fellowship (Australia Council Grants, Awards and Fellowships) valued at $80,000 to write an autobiography and book of poems.

Llewellyn was appointed a Member of the Order of Australia in the 2024 Australia Day Honours for "significant service to literature as an author, historian and academic".

== Awards ==
- 2006 Australian Book of the Year for Playing with Water (2005) diary
- 1982 Joint Winner, Anne Elder Award (Fellowship of Australian Writers Victoria Inc. National Literary Awards) for Trader Kate and the Elephants (Friendly Street Poets)
- 1975 Bundey Prize for English Verse for Teeth and Other Verses (1975) Selected work poetry

== Bibliography ==
=== Poetry ===
Collections

- Teeth [and other verses] (University of Adelaide, 1975)
- Trader Kate and the Elephants (Friendly Street Poets, 1982)
- Luxury (Women’s Redress Press, 1985)
- Honey: Poems or I am my own companion (Hudson Publishing, 1988)
- Figs: Poems (Hudson Publishing, 1990)
- Selected Poems (Hudson Publishing, 1992)
- Crosshatched (Angus & Robertson, 1994)
- Sofala: And Other Poems (Hudson Publishing, 1999)
- Kate Llewellyn (University of Wollongong Press, 2010)
- Harbour : poems 2000–2019. Wakefield Press. 2019.

=== Non-fiction ===
- The Penguin Book of Australian Women Poets, with Susan Hampton co-editor (Penguin, 1986)
- The Waterlily: A Blue Mountains Journal (Hudson Publishing, 1987)
- Dear You (Hudson Publishing, 1988)
- The Mountain (Hudson Publishing, 1989)
- Angels and Dark Madonnas (Hudson Publishing, 1991)
- Lilies, Feathers & Frangipani (Angus & Robertson, 1993) – travelogue / braille
- The Floral Mother and Other Essays (Angus & Robertson, 1995)
- Gorillas, Tea and Coffee: An African Sketchbook (Hudson Publishing, 1996)
- Burning: A Journal (Hudson Publishing, 1997)
- Playing with Water (HarperCollins, 2005)
- The Dressmaker's Daughter (Fourth Estate, 2008)
- A Fig at the Gate: The Joys of Friendship, Gardening and the Gaining of Wisdom (Allen & Unwin, 2014)
- First Things First: Selected Letters of Kate Llewellyn 1977–2004, edited by Ruth Bacchus & Barbara Hill (Wakefield Press, 2015)

=== Selected critical studies and reviews of Llewellyn's work ===
Harbour : poems 2000–2019

- Jeffery, Ella (January–February 2021). "Observer effect : three new poetry collections". Australian Book Review. 428: 54–55.

== Selected contributions ==
In 1982 three of Llewellyn’s short stories – "The Balts", "Gone" and "I Am My Own Companion" – were published in Frictions, an Anthology of Fiction by Women, edited by Anna Gibbs and Alison Tilson (Sybylla Cooperative Press & Publications, 1982).

Her short story for Room to Move: The Redress Press Book of Australian Women's Short Stories edited by Suzanne Falkiner (Allen & Unwin, 1985) was one of 32 chosen from over 700 submissions.

She is represented in The New Oxford Book of Australian Verse Chosen by Les A Murray (Oxford University Press, 1986).

Her poem, "Finished", from Selected Poems, was selected by John Leonard for inclusion in Australian Verse: An Oxford Anthology (Melbourne Oxford University Press, 1998).

Places in the heart: thirty prominent Australians reveal their special corners of the world, edited and compiled by Susan Kurosawa (Sceptre, 1997) includes her "Endless Horizons".

=== Selected list of poems ===
Title	Year	First published	Reprinted/collected in
"To a Married Man"	1980	Overland, July 1980	Trader Kate and the Elephants, Friendly Street Poets, 1982, p. 30
