= Elizabeth Harrower (writer) =

Australian novelist (1928–2020)

- Born: 8 February 1928; Newcastle, New South Wales, Australia
- Died: 7 July 2020 (aged 92); Sydney, New South Wales, Australia
- Occupations: Novelist, short story writer, journalist

Elizabeth Harrower (8 February 1928 – 7 July 2020) was an Australian novelist and short story writer. She is particularly known for her novels The Watch Tower (1966) and In Certain Circles, which she wrote in 1971 but only published in 2014, winning the Voss Literary Prize.

== Early life ==
Elizabeth Harrower was born on 8 February 1928 and spent her childhood in industrial Newcastle, New South Wales, living with her grandmother after the divorce of her parents. One of her uncles died in the Sandakan Death Marches.

She lived in London from 1951 to 1959. On her return to Sydney she worked as a reviewer for The Sydney Morning Herald, for the ABC, and in publishing.

== Career ==
Harrower published her first three novels in quick succession, beginning with Down in the City in 1957. Novelist Christina Stead was a champion of her work, praising The Long Prospect in particular. In 1971 her fifth novel In Certain Circles was set to be published, before she abruptly withdrew it from publication following the death of her mother. In an interview with The Australian, Harrower said that she had written the book under pressure after receiving a grant, and called the act of writing it "forced labour". Afterwards she published a few short stories before giving her writing up entirely by 1977.

Much of her work tackles the theme of domestic abuse, particularly the psychological abuse of vulnerable women at the hands of their manipulative, deceitful and tyrannical male partners.

In 2012, following a period of obscurity during which all of her novels fell out of print, Harrower experienced a small revival when Michael Heyward and Penny Hueston, editors of the independent press Text Publishing, began to reprint her works. They attempted to persuade Harrower to publish In Certain Circles and she eventually acquiesced, allowing the novel to be published in 2014. The novel received positive reviews and renewed interest in all of Harrower's novels. In 2015, a collection of stories from throughout Harrower's career was published as A Few Days in the Country: And Other Stories.

Harrower has been considered "one of the great novelists of Sydney".

== Death ==
Harrower died on 7 July 2020, aged 92 in Sydney.

Helen Trinca's biography, Looking for Elizabeth: The Life of Elizabeth Harrower, was published in July 2025.

== Awards and nominations ==
- 1968: Commonwealth Literary Fund fellowship
- 1974: Australian Council for the Arts fellowship
- 1996: Patrick White Award
- 2015: Voss Literary Prize for In Certain Circles
- 2015 In Certain Circles short-listed for the New South Wales Premier's Literary Awards
- 2016: Queensland Literary Awards – University of Southern Queensland Australian Short Story Collection – Steele Rudd Award — co-winner for A Few Days in the Country and other stories

== Bibliography ==
=== Novels ===
- Down in the City (1957)
- The Long Prospect (1958)
- The Catherine Wheel (1960)
- The Watch Tower (1966)
- In Certain Circles (2014)

=== Short fiction ===
Collections

- A Few Days in the Country: And Other Stories (2015)

Selected short stories

- "Alice" (The New Yorker, 2015)
