= The Watch Tower =

1966 novel by Elizabeth Harrower

- Author: Elizabeth Harrower
- Language: English
- Genre: Literary fiction
- Publisher: St. Martin's Press
- Publication date: 1966
- Publication place: Australia
- Media type: Print
- Pages: 219 pp

The Watch Tower (1966) is a novel by Australian author Elizabeth Harrower.

== Plot outline ==
Laura and Clare Vaizey are sisters living in Sydney in the period around World War II. When their father dies and their class-conscious mother decides to return to live in England the sisters are left to fend for themselves. Laura abandons her medical studies, goes to work in a factory and accepts a marriage proposal from Felix Shaw on the understanding that he will also look after her sister. But Felix is an attention-hungry tyrant with a lack of empathy who sets out to belittle, gaslight and demean the two sisters at every opportunity.

== Critical reception ==
Reviewing the novel in The Washington Post on its reissue in 2012 Michael Dirda was unequivocal: "This is a harrowing novel, relentless in its depiction of marital enslavement, spiritual self-destruction and the exploited condition of women in a masculinist society. It reminded me of Zola in its unflinching depiction of two sisters entangled with a moody, violent man, one of them being gradually crushed into subservience, the other struggling desperately to save her own soul. It is a brilliant achievement." Praised by Patrick White in his letters edited by David Marr.

== See also ==
- 1966 in Australian literature

== Notes ==
Text Publishing re-issued the novel in 2012 as part of their Text Classics series.

After the novel was re-issued the author was interviewed by Ramona Koval for The Monthly.
