= Naked Girl and Mirror =

1966 poem by Australian poet Judith Wright

- by Judith Wright
- Written: 1966
- First published in: The Other Half : Poems
- Country: Australia
- Language: English
- Lines: 35

"Naked Girl and Mirror" (1966) is a poem by Australian poet Judith Wright.

It was originally published in the poet's collection The Other Half : Poems in 1946, and was subsequently reprinted in the author's single-author collections and a number of Australian poetry anthologies.

== Synopsis ==
The poem explores some aspects of body image as a young girl, on the edge of puberty, exmaines herself in a mirror. She sees her reflection as something other than her real self, "This is not I", and wonders how it came to be.

== Critical reception ==
In his book Reading Australian Poetry Andrew Taylor commented that Wright looks at the difference between "the child's absence of body and the mature woman's bodliness", concluding that "we also have a contrast between the already accomplished fulfilment of the child, and the uncertainty of the future fulfilment; and this possible future fulfilment contrasts with the child's solipistic self-sufficiency by being dependent on someone else, on another."

Reviewing the poem for The California Journal of Women Writers Jennifer Messing noted "In trying to figure out where this body came from and who ordered the curves and lines of womanhood to be imposed upon her, she also tries to find out who the woman in the mirror really is. She is detached from the lovely image, yet bound to it by expectation and truth."

== Publication history ==
After the poem's initial publication in The Other Half : Poems it was reprinted as follows:

- Australian Poetry 1966 edited by David Campbell, Angus and Robertson, 1948
- Poetry from Australia : Judith Wright, William Hart-Smith, Randolph Stow edited by Howard Sergeant, Pergamon Press, 1969
- Judith Wright : Collected Poems, 1942-1970 by Judith Wright, Angus and Robertson, 1971
- Australian Verse from 1805 : A Continuum edited by Geoffrey Dutton, Rigby, 1976
- Two Centuries of Australian Poetry edited by Mark O'Connor, Oxford University Press, 1988
- A Human Pattern : Selected Poems by Judith Wright, Angus and Robertson, 1990
- Collected Poems 1942-1985 by Judith Wright, Angus and Robertson, 1994
- Seven Centuries of Poetry in English edited by John Leonard, Oxford University Press, 2003
- The Penguin Anthology of Australian Poetry edited by John Kinsella, Penguin, 2009
- Sense, Shape, Symbol : An Investigation of Australian Poetry edited by Brian Keyte, Phoenix Education, 2012

== See also ==
- 1966 in Australian literature
- 1966 in poetry
