= Sylvia Kantaris =

British poet, based in Cornwall (1936–2021)

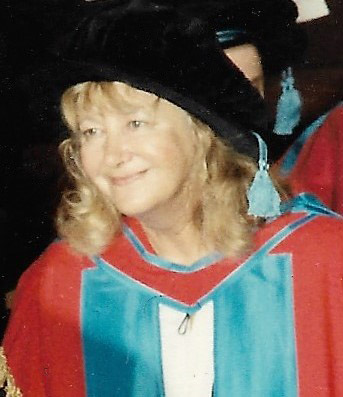
- Kantaris at Honorary Degree ceremony, University of Exeter, 1989
- Born: 9 January 1936; Grindleford, Peak District, Derbyshire, UK
- Died: 19 November 2021 (aged 85); Hayle, Cornwall, UK
- Education: University of Bristol (BA); University of Queensland (MA, PhD)
- Occupations: Poet; Academic
- Spouse: Noel Kantaris
- Children: 2
- Writing career
- Language: English
- Genre: Poetry

Sylvia Kantaris (9 January 1936 – 19 November 2021, also known as Sylvia Kantarizis) was a British (and Australian) poet, based for much of her life in Cornwall, who published eight collections of poetry, of which two were in collaboration. Her work was widely anthologized and translated into various languages, including Italian, Japanese and Finnish.

== Biography ==
She was born in the Peak District, Derbyshire, in 1936, and attended the University of Bristol where she received her BA in French. She then moved to Australia for ten years, where she was a Tutor in French at the University of Queensland while studying for her M.A. and Ph.D., both on French Surrealism. In 1971 she returned to the UK, and settled in Helston, Cornwall, in 1974, where she undertook tutoring in Twentieth-Century Poetry for the Open University and for the University of Exeter Extra-Mural programme, while writing and publishing her major works of poetry. She was appointed as Cornwall's first Writer in the Community in 1986, and was regularly invited to give Poetry Workshops and courses at the Arvon Foundation. She received an honorary Doctor of Letters from the University of Exeter in recognition of her literary achievements in 1989, and many of her literary papers are held in the University of Exeter archive. She lived on her own in Helston from 1990 until her death.

== Work ==
Her first work, Time & Motion (1975) was published in Australia under the name "Sylvia Kantarizis", and her poetry is sometimes republished under that name in anthologies of Australian poetry. However, most of her work was published in Britain, and some of her poetry has a specifically Cornish theme. Her second major book, The Tenth Muse (1983) explores the relationship of women to writing, and "through its title, evokes a whole tradition of women's poetry". Shortly after its publication, she was involved in a lively feminist debate in the Letters pages of The Times Literary Supplement concerning a fictional "Hysterical Women's Movement" that many contemporary reviewers of women's writing appeared to believe in. Her next collection, The Sea at the Door (1985) is described by one reviewer as "a haunted book – haunted by past and present selves, none of them quite real", noting particularly the way in which she often engages intense erotic themes through the filter of imagination and dreams. Some of her work focuses on fraught relationships between men and women, together with an exploration of gender politics, notably News from the Front (1983), co-authored with the poet and novelist D. M. Thomas, in which each poet explores the conflictive relationship between a young Portuguese radical and a right-wing British businessman, with each sometimes adopting the feminine and sometimes the masculine persona. The Air Mines of Mistila (1988), written in collaboration with the poet Philip Gross, has a Latin American theme, with allusions to the novel Pedro Páramo by Juan Rulfo in a number of the poems. This collection won the Poetry Book Society Choice of 1988. Her next published book, Dirty Washing (1989) contains selected poems drawn from four previous books together with several new poems. Her penultimate book, Lad's Love (1993), is a collection of love poetry, exploring the relationship between an older woman and a younger man. Her last book, entitled Lost Property (1998), is a miscellaneous collection of her later poetry.

She was also the author of a number of academic articles on Dada and French Surrealism (published under the name Sylvia Kantarizis), and essays on poetry.

== Poetry collections ==
- Time & Motion (Australia: Prism/Poetry Society of Australia, 1975 ISBN 978-0-85869-007-3; rpt Cornwall: Menhir, 1986 ISBN 978-0-907654-04-9)
- Stocking Up (Menhir, 1981 ISBN 978-0-907654-00-1)
- The Tenth Muse (Liskeard: Harry Chambers/Peterloo Poets, 1983 ISBN 978-0-905291-48-2; rpt Menhir, 1986 ISBN 978-0-907654-03-2)
- The Sea at the Door (London: Secker & Warburg Limited, 1985), translated as Il mare alla porta: poesie by Simonetta Zappalà (Forlì, Italy: Forum / Quinta Generazione, 1991 OCLC 955848602)
- News from the Front by D.M. Thomas and Sylvia Kantaris (Lancashire: Arc Publications, 1983 ISBN 978-0-902771-93-2)
- The Air Mines of Mistila by Philip Gross and Sylvia Kantaris (Newcastle upon Tyne: Bloodaxe Books, 1988)
- Dirty Washing: New and Selected Poems (Newcastle upon Tyne: Bloodaxe Books, 1989)
- Lad's Love (Newcastle upon Tyne: Bloodaxe Books, 1993)
