= Silvana Gardner =

Australian artist (born 1942)

Silvana Gardner (born 1942) is a writer and visual artist in Australia. Her art works are held in major art collections including the National Gallery of Victoria and the Queensland Art Gallery.

== Personal ==
Silvana Caterina Kerstich was born in Zadar, Croatia, subsequently Yugoslavia, on 9 February 1942. She was educated in Italy and completed her education in Brisbane after she migrated with her parents as refugees to Australia in 1951. She graduated in fine arts and literature from the University of Queensland. Gardner went on to work as a visual artist and to write poetry.

Her visual works are represented in major collections in Australia, Canada, and America, including the American Telephone & Telegraph collection, New York; National Gallery of Victoria; Queensland Art Gallery; and Griffith University collection. Gardner has been involved with literary workshops, poetry readings, youth festivals, and writing workshops in schools and with underprivileged youth. Her papers are held in the Fryer Library at the University of Queensland.

== Poetry ==
- When Sunday Comes (1982), University of Queensland Press
- With Open Eyes (1983), Queensland Community Press
- Children of the Dragon (1985), Jacaranda
- The Devil in Nature (1987), University of Queensland Press
- Cochineal Red (1992), National Library of Australia (Pamphlet poets)
- The Painter of Icons (1993), Boolarong

== Other works ==
- The Rainbow Cat (1990), Boolarong Press - fiction for Children & Young Adults
