= Diane Fahey =

Australian poet

- Born: Diane Mary Brotheridge; 2 January 1945 (age 81); Melbourne, Australia
- Occupation: Poet
- Writing career
- Language: English

Diane Mary Fahey (born 2 January 1945) is an Australian poet. She was born Diane Mary Brotheridge in Melbourne, Australia and lives in the Barwon Heads area, near Geelong.

A winner of the 1985 Mattara Poetry Prize, the 1987 Wesley Michel Wright Prize and many other awards, Fahey has been widely published in Australian and internationally and received writing grants from the Australia Council, Arts Victoria and Arts South Australia. She has been writer in residence at Ormond College, University of Melbourne and the University of Adelaide.

Her main creative concerns are nature writing, Greek myths, visual art, fairy tales and literary mystery novels. Her most recent collection Sea Wall and River Light (Five Islands Press) is a series of sonnets about Barwon Heads, tracing the year at that place.

Fahey holds a B.A. and an M.A. in Literature and a PhD in Creative Writing for her study, 'Places and Spaces of the Writing Life'.

== Publications ==
=== Poetry collections ===
- Voices from the Honeycomb (1986)
- Metamorphoses (1988)
- Turning the Hourglass (1990)
- Mayflies in Amber (1994)
- The Body in Time (1995)
- Listening to a Far Sea (1998)
- The Sixth Swan (2001)
- Sea Wall and River Light (2006)
- Winter Solstice and Other Poems (2008)
- The Wing Collection : New and Selected Poems (2011)
- The Stone Garden : Poems from Clare (2013)
- A House by the River (2016)
- November Journal (2017)
- Glass Flowers (2021)
- The Light Cafe (2023)

=== Novella ===
- The Mystery of Rosa Morland (2008)
