= Peter Mathers =

Australian author and playwright

Peter Mathers (16 July 1931 in England – 8 November 2004 in Melbourne) was an English-born Australian author and playwright.

== Early life ==
Mathers' family emigrated to Australia while he was a child. He attended state school in Sydney, and later Sydney Technical College, where he studied agriculture. He "farmed, clerked, woolled, gardened, landscaped, chemicalled", and did other things before settling into his writing career.

== Later life ==
In 1961 he married and went to France to live in a cork oak forest. His two daughters were born in London. From 1964 he worked in Britain and Europe as a researcher. His first writing appeared in the early 1960s, and in 1967 he took up a writing fellowship in the United States. He returned to Australia in 1968.

In 1966 Mathers completed his first novel, Trap, an inventive and often comic novel concerning the escapades and family history of Jack Trap, an urban mixed-blood Aboriginal person in what was then a society racially divided by the White Australia policy. It won the Miles Franklin Literary Award, His second novel, The Wort Papers (1972), ranged across the country in rural settings from the Kimberley to dairy country in northern New South Wales, and further established his reputation as a stylistic innovator and satirist.

Mathers wrote radio plays, articles and published many stories in magazines, journals and newspapers before beginning a substantial playwriting career, which included Pelaco Hill, Bats, The Mountain King and The Real McCoy. Some short stories were collected as A Change For the Better. Mathers was featured in the Australian art book, In the making, which included photos of him and his urban environment and excerpts from Trap.

== Death ==
He lived in Melbourne for many years prior to his death in 2004 from pancreatic cancer.

== Oral History ==
Mathers was interviewed by Hazel de Berg in 1969 about his childhood and writing career. The recording can be found at the National Library of Australia.
