= Susan Hampton =

Australian poet (born 1949)

Susan Hampton (born 1949) is an Australian poet who lives in Davistown, New South Wales.

== Biography ==
Susan Hampton was born in Inverell, New South Wales, in 1949, and lived in Annandale in Sydney for many years. She has taught writing at UTS and other universities. Currently she lives in Davistown near Gosford on the Central Coast north of Sydney with her wife Charlotte Clutterbuck. She has written eight books including poetry, fiction and non-fiction, and her work is collected in many anthologies. Several of her books have won national awards. Her work has been translated into Spanish, Chinese and Ukrainian. A selection of her poems appears in Australian Poetry since 1788, edited by Geoffrey Lehmann and Robert Gray (UNSW Press, 2011), and in Contemporary Australian Poetry, edited by Martin Langford, Judith Beveridge, Judy Johnston and David Musgrave (Puncher and Wattmann 2016).

"Hampton has two approaches in her poetry: a style which plays language games, and a realistic and detailed often explicitly autobiographical style. Hampton's output is small but incisive. She is able to express emotion with a lightness of touch."

Her early books include the poetry collections Costumes (Transit Poetry, 1981) and White Dog Sonnets (Fab Press, 1987). The Penguin Book of Australian Women Poets, which she co-edited with Kate Llewellyn, became a set text on many writing courses.

Her next book, Surly Girls, won the Steele Rudd Award in 1990. It presents performance pieces and short stories (A&R/Collins Imprint, 1989). A Latin Primer, published by Cerberus Press in 1999, was written in one day, though it was edited over many months. A sequence of 23 sonnets about Mozart, Latin, addiction and love, it was recorded for ABC Radio National's program Poetica in 2003. The program features poems from early works and a selection from A Latin Primer.

The Kindly Ones, a 43-page narrative poem (Five Islands Press, 2005), has also been recorded and is available from www.riverroadpress.net. It tells the story of the three Furies of Ancient Greece who decide to take a holiday from punishing people at the gate of hell and come to contemporary Sydney, stay at the backpackers in Glebe and keep in touch by mobile phone. "…a weird satirical travelogue written by one of the Furies.... It is an extraordinary poem: bold, bitter, intelligent and fantastical." (Lisa Gorton) Containing another 50 pages of poems On the Bright Road, The Kindly Ones won the 2006 Judith Wright Award and was shortlisted for the NSW and Victorian Premiers’ Awards for poetry, the Age Book of the Year Award, and the ACT Book of the Year Award.

Two essays, "Blood" (7000w) and "Scale by Scale" (4000w) are collected in anthologies.

After graduating from Newcastle Teacher's College Susan went on to a BA (honours) in English Literature, studying at Newcastle, Macquarie and Sydney Universities. In the 1980s she taught writing at UTS in Sydney. She has a son and two granddaughters. Her work as a Writer-in-Residence included the Australian National University, the University of Canberra, the University of New England, and Varuna Writer's Retreat, where she taught editing.

In 1977, she was a joint winner of the Patricia Hackett Prize (Westerly), and in 1979 won the Dame Mary Gilmore Award for poetry. She also won the Shire of Eltham Short Story Award. Hampton has also edited trade fiction and non-fiction books including Stravinsky's Lunch (Drusilla Modjeska), Gilgamesh (Joan London), and The Poison Principle (Gail Bell), which have all won major prizes.

Hampton's book News of the Insect World (poems, Five Islands Press, 2009) riffs on infinity, nightclubs, fugues, Caracas, the cordless drill, Dante's Purgatory, and scarabs and dragonflies.

Her memoir, Anything Can Happen, was published in 2024. It won the 2025 Victorian Premier's Prize for Nonfiction.

== Bibliography ==
=== Poetry ===
- Costumes: poems and prose (Transit New Poetry, 1981) ISBN 0-9594377-2-X
- White Dog Sonnets (Sydney: Fab, 1987) ISBN 0-9587831-0-1
- A Latin Primer (Cerberus, 1998)ISBN 0-9587293-2-8
- The Kindly Ones (Five Islands, 2005) ISBN 1-74128-093-1 reviews:
- News of the Insect World (Five Islands, 2009) ISBN 978-0-7340-4105-0

=== Short fiction ===
- Surly Girls (Collins, 1990) ISBN 0-7322-2512-4

=== Essays ===
- 'Album of Huts' in Inner Citiesedited by Drusilla Modjeska (Penguin, 1989)
- 'Memory (and the Black Sea Amazons)' in Australian Book Review Dec-Jan 1991-1992
- 'Blood' in Family Pictures edited by Beth Yahp (A & R Sydney 1994) ISBN 0-207-18532-8
- 'Scale by Scale' in The Best Australian Essays 2007 edited by Drusilla Modjeska (Black Inc Melbourne 2007) ISBN 978-1-86395-419-8

=== Edited ===
- The Penguin Book of Australian Women Poets co-edited with Kate Llewellyn (Penguin, 1986) ISBN 0-14-058575-3

=== Non-fiction ===
- About Literature HSC English Textbook, with Sue Woolfe. (Macmillan, 1984) ISBN 0-333-35666-7

=== Memoir ===
- Anything Can Happen (Puncher and Wattmann, 2024) ISBN 9781923099012
