= Dipti Saravanamuttu =

Sri Lankan-Australian poet and academic

Dipti Saravanamuttu (born 1960) is a contemporary Sri Lankan-Australian poet and academic.

Dipti Saravanamuttu was born in Sri Lanka and arrived in Australia with her family in 1972. After studying English at Sydney University, apart from writing, she has worked as a journalist, a scriptwriter and has taught at the University of London.

The subject matter of her poetry ranges from everyday conversation to literary theory with some emphasis on issues of social justice. Her collection The Colosseum won the Age Book of the Year Dinny O'Hearn award for Poetry in 2005 and was shortlisted for the Kenneth Slessor Prize for Poetry in the same year.

== Bibliography ==
=== Poetry ===
- Statistic For The New World (Rochford Street, 1988)
- Language of the Icons (Angus & Robertson, 1993) ISBN 0-207-18218-3
- The Colosseum (Five Islands, 2004) ISBN 1-74128-043-5

=== Fiction ===
- Dancing From The Edge of Darkness (Papyrus, 2000) ISBN 1-875934-26-X
