= Minnie Agnes Filson =

Australian poet

- From the cover of her book
- Born: Minnie Agnes May Cole; 3 May 1898; Wyalong, New South Wales, Australia
- Died: 7 November 1971 (aged 73); Cremorne, New South Wales, Australia
- Occupation: Poet
- Writing career
- Pen name: Rickety Kate; Ricketty Kate; Stella Filson; Michael Strong; Judith Grey; Rex Kater
- Notable work: Feet on the Ground

Minnie Agnes Filson (3 May 1898 – 7 November 1971) was an Australian poet. She wrote under a number of pseudonyms including Rickety Kate (sometimes Ricketty Kate), Stella Filson, Michael Strong, Judith Grey and Rex Kater.

== Life ==
Minnie Agnes Filson was born on 3 May 1898 at Wyalong, then a gold-mining settlement. She grew up in Mosman and was educated there.

At the time of her marriage, she was manager of the Church Standard. On 6 December 1924 she married Arthur Johnston Filson. She suffered rheumatoid arthritis which was exacerbated after the birth of her only son the following year. Bed-bound, she adopted the pseudonym, Rickety Kate. The Sun described her writing practice: "She composes, corrects and scans mentally. It means a lot of memorising–and some of her narrative poems are long. Finally she dictates to either of two friends who have elected themselves her scribes–but that necessarily at their convenience." She was unable to hold a book to read, again friends read poetry to her but her "greatest joy is the daily ten minutes when my son holds up a book for me to read myself".

Filson contributed poems to The Sydney Morning Herald in the 1930s, including one called the "Sydney Harbour Bridge". She also wrote poems and stories for The New South Wales School Magazine from the early 1930s until at least 1954.

She was a member of the Jindyworobak poetry movement; her 1944 book, Bralgah, was a Jindyworobak publication and individual poems were included in the Jindyworobak Anthology of 1941, 1942, 1944, 1946 and 1952.

Her poetry has been included in a number of anthologies, including The Penguin Book of Australian Woman Poets, Sydney's Poems: A Selection on the Occasion of the City's One Hundred and Fiftieth Anniversary 1842–1992, Macquarie PEN Anthology of Australian Literature, Australian Poetry Since 1788 and The Oxford Book of Australian Women's Verse.

Filson wrote Feet on the Ground in the 1940s, using the pseudonym Judith Grey. It was published posthumously in 2008 by her granddaughter, artist Lenore Bassan, who created a concertina book, Cornerstone, about Filson's house at Cremorne.

Her papers are held in the State Library of New South Wales.

== Works ==
- Rhymes & Whimsies, 1930
- Out of the Dust, 1939
- Bralgah: A legend, 1944
- Feet on the Ground: An autobiographical novel, 2008

== Death ==
Filson died on 7 November 1971 at Cremorne, New South Wales.
