= Katherine Gallagher =

Australian poet resident in London

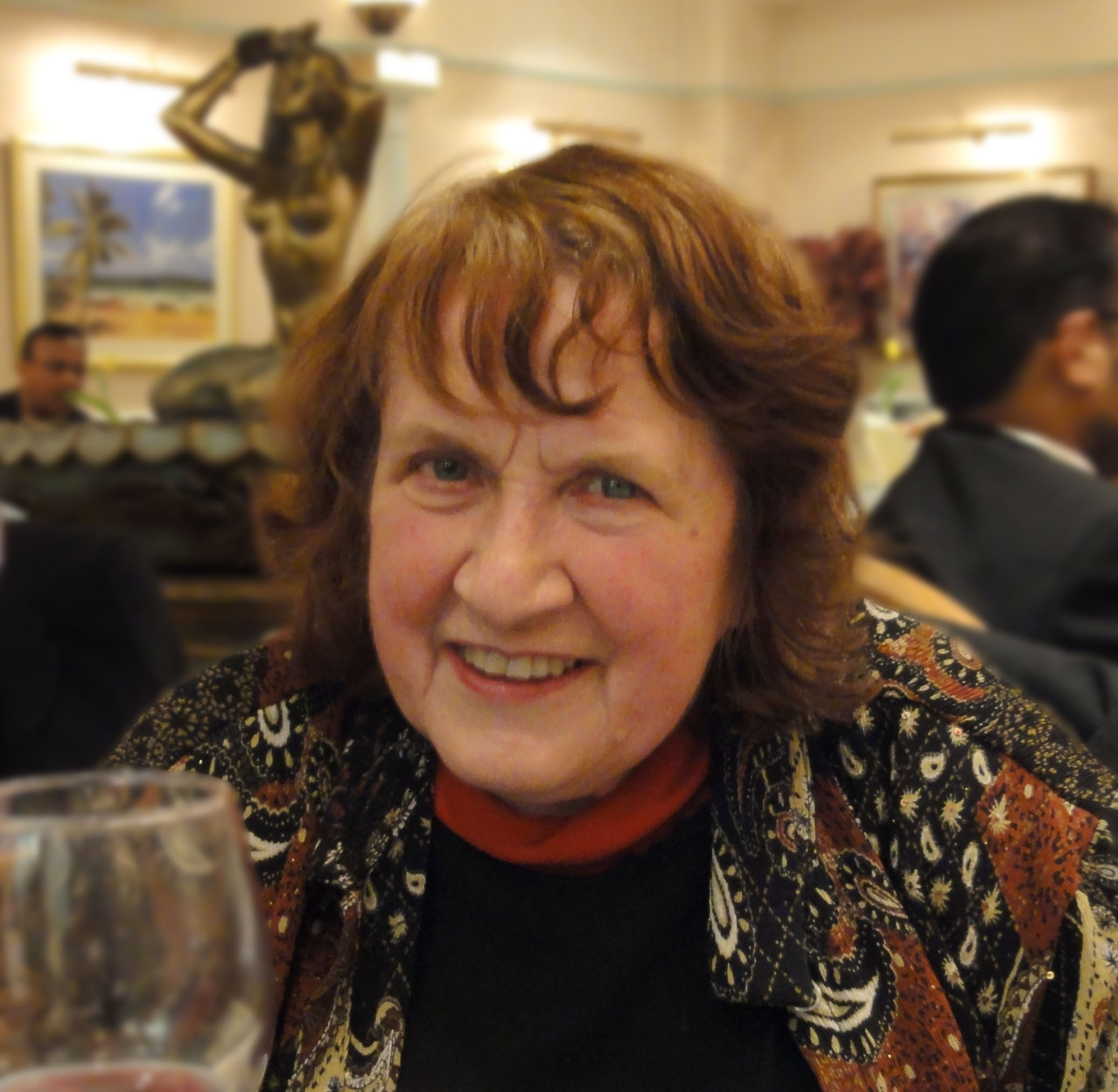
- 2010, London
- Born: 7 September 1935 (age 91); Maldon, Victoria, Australia
- Occupation: Poet
- Website: www.katherine-gallagher.com

Katherine Gallagher (born 7 September 1935) is an Australian poet resident in London. Translations of her poems have appeared in French, German, Hebrew, Italian, Romanian and Serbo-Croat. Gallagher translated from French to English Jean-Jacques Celly's poems in The Sleepwalker with Eyes of Clay.

== Awards ==
- 1978, Australian Literature Board Fellowship.
- 1981, Brisbane Warana Prize.
- 1986, nomination of "Passengers to the City" for the John Bray National Poetry Award.
- 2000, Royal Literary Fund award.
- 2008, London Society of Authors' Foundation award.

== Career ==
- Writer in Residence at Railway Fields Nature Reserve, Harringay, in 2002.
- Writers Inc/Blue Nose Poets' Education Officer until 2008. In 2004/2005 this included coordinating the Young Writer's Mentorship Project funded by the Arts Council.
- Poet in Residence for Havering Council's third annual Parks and Arts Healthy Lifestyle Walk in Hornchurch Country Park on 17 July 2006.
- Founder of the Poetry Society Stanza Group (London North), started in March 2007.

== See also ==
- South Australian Premier's Awards

== Sources ==
- Celly, Jean-Jacques; Gallagher, Katherine (1994), The sleepwalker with eyes of clay: poems, Forest Books, ISBN 978-1-85610-029-8
- Gallagher, Katherine (2000), Tigers on the silk road, Arc, ISBN 978-1-900072-47-2
- Gallagher, Katherine (2006), Circus-apprentice, Arc Publications, ISBN 978-1-904614-02-9
- Gallagher, Katherine (2009), Carnival edge, Arc, ISBN 978-1-906570-42-2, OCLC 436266162
