= Mary Finnin =

Australian poet, artist and art teacher

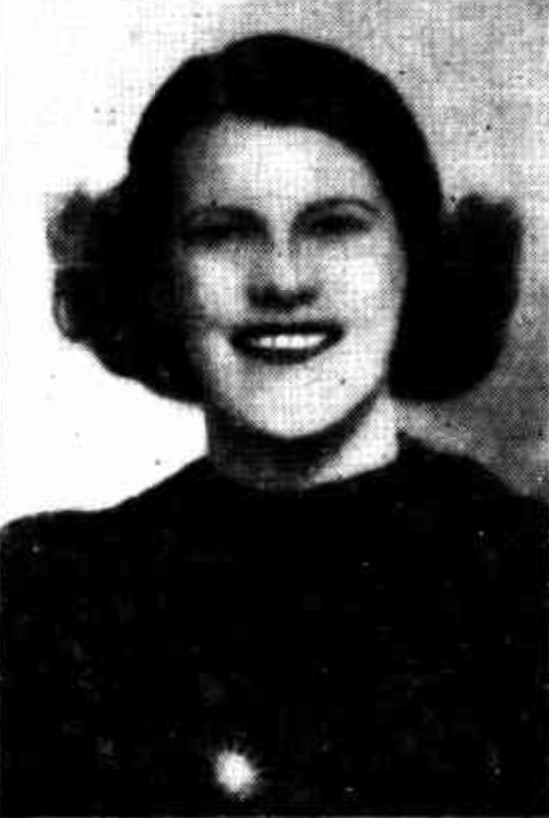
- Finnin in 1941
- Born: 1906; Geelong, Victoria, Australia
- Died: 6 December 1992 (aged 85–86)
- Education: University of Melbourne
- Occupations: Poet, artist and arts and crafts teacher

Mary Finnin (1906 – 6 December 1992) was an Australian artist, art teacher and poet.

Finnin was born at Geelong in 1906. She was educated locally, before attending the University of Melbourne, where she trained in art and became an art teacher. She was employed at Geelong Grammar School in the 1930s where she taught art and all kinds of craft. She also designed stage sets and costumes for the school's performances. At the same time she held a solo exhibition of her work in Adelaide.

Many of Finnin's poems appeared first in The Bulletin and Australian literary journals, such as Meanjin, Southerly and Quadrant, prior to publication in books. She also contributed to Walkabout, including "Down the Murray in a Kayak", the story of an adventure she undertook with her husband when newly-weds.

Hazel de Berg recorded Finnin reading two of her poems in April 1959 and in July 1973 interviewed her for the National Library of Australia, where the recordings are held. In the interview Finnin spoke of her work as an artist, arts and craft teacher, trade unionist and Red Cross worker.

== Works ==
- Finnin, Mary (1938), A beggar's opera: Poems, W.A. Hamer
- Finnin, Mary (1939), Look down Olympians: Poems, W.A. Hamer
- Finnin, Mary (1940), Poems (Limited edition 50 copies ed.), W.A. Hamer
- Finnin, Mary (1941), Royal, W.A. Hamer
- Finnin, Mary (1945), The book of Bauble, W.A. Hamer
- Finnin, Mary (1947), Alms for oblivion, W. A. Hamer
- Finnin, Mary (1957), The shield of place, Angus and Robertson
- Finnin, Mary (January 1979), Off shears (1958–1978), Hawthorn Press (published 1979), ISBN 978-0-7256-0254-3
