= Jan Owen (poet) =

Australian poet (born 1940)

- Born: Janette Muriel Sincock; 18 August 1940 (age 85); Adelaide, Australia
- Occupation: Poet

Jan Owen (born 18 August 1940) is a contemporary Australian poet.

== Life ==
Jan Owen was born Janette Muriel Sincock in Adelaide, South Australia, attending school there and in Melbourne, leaving early to work as a laboratory assistant. During the 60s she studied arts part-time at the University of Adelaide, then librarianship, and later travelled extensively in Europe and Asia.

Owen has worked as a writer, creative writing teacher and editor since 1985.

In July 2016 she was awarded the Philip Hodgins Memorial Medal at the Mildura Writers' Festival.

== Poetry ==
Owen began writing poetry in her thirties, and her first collection, Boy with Telescope (1986), won the Anne Elder Award. She has had several writer's residencies in Australia and also in Italy, France, Malaysia, and Scotland.

Her awards include the Philip Hodgins Memorial Medal, the Mary Gilmore Prize and the Gwen Harwood Poetry Prize. In 2007, she won the Max Harris Poetry Award for her poem "Scent, Comb, Spoon". The judges wrote: "a well crafted poem full of intriguing resonances on the theme of memory and association. The poem spins a chain of possibilities and disharmonies but always returns to the idea of the value of what we have experienced. This is a poem of turns and surprises and we enjoyed it more with each reading".

In a radio interview in 2002, Owen said that "I sometimes think that I should be writing political satire or trying to tackle the real problems of this world, and then I remember a Taoist saying which is 'You think you can improve the world? I do not think it can be done'." In the same interview, she also said that "poetry is against dogma, against a final certainty, it's very unsettling. ... I think we need the challenge and the shake-up, and the freshness of a new way of looking at things which poetry can give us."

Owen has read her poems at Friendly Street Poets and been published in their anthologies.

== Bibliography ==
=== Poetry ===
- Boy with Telescope (Angus & Robertson, 1986) ISBN 0-207-15296-9
- Fingerprints on light (Angus & Robertson, 1990) ISBN 0-207-16582-3
- Blackberry season (Molonglo, 1993) ISBN 0-646-12147-2
- Night rainbows (William Heinemann, 1994) ISBN 0-85561-515-X
- Timedancing (Five Islands, 2002) ISBN 0-86418-775-0
- Blackberry Season 2nd edition (Picaro Press, 2007) ISBN 978-1920957421
- Poems 1980-2008 (John Leonard Press, 2008) ISBN 978-0-9775787-8-8

=== Edited ===
- Co-edited with Bray, John Jefferson (1983), No. 7 Friendly St. poetry reader, Friendly Street Poets
- Time's Collision with the Tongue With Peter Boyle (Coal River, 2000) ISBN 978-0-86418-698-0
- Living Room: Poems from the Centre (Ptilotus, 2003) ISBN 0-646-43101-3 Review
