= Rosemary Dobson =

Australian poet, illustrator, editor and anthologist (1920–2012)

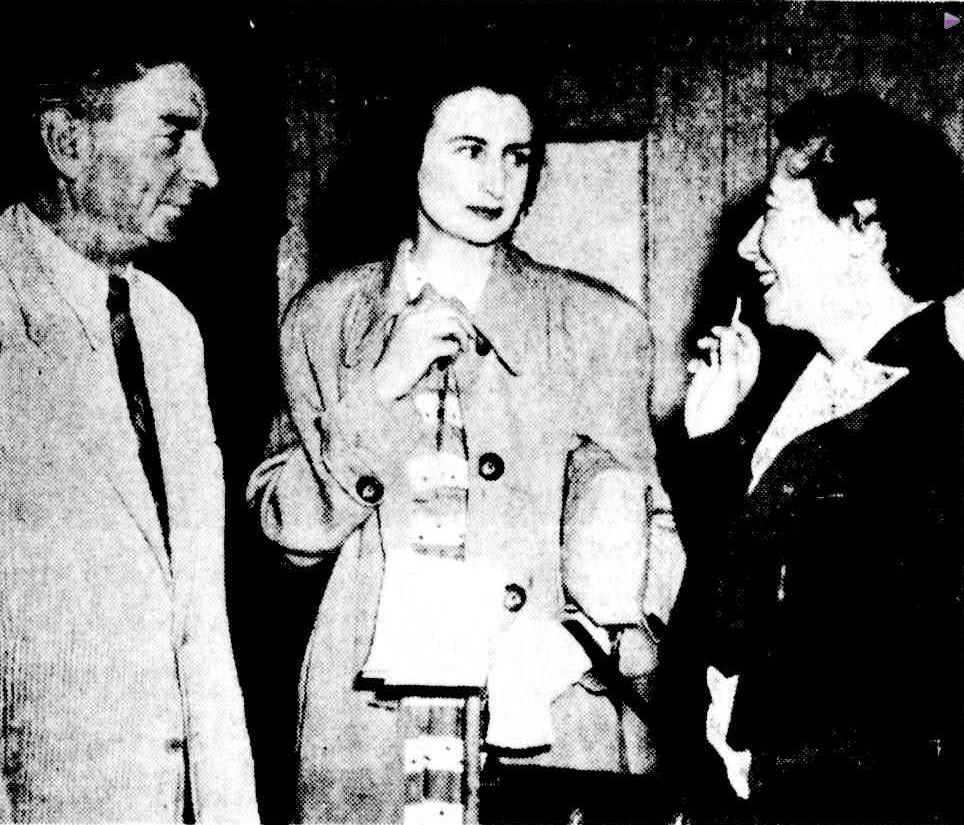
- Dobson (centre) with Maximilian Feuerring and Imre Szigeti, at the Macquarie Galleries
- Born: 18 June 1920; Sydney, New South Wales
- Died: 27 June 2012 (aged 92); Canberra, Australia
- Occupations: Poet, anthologist, editor, teacher
- Known for: Poetry
- Spouse: Alec Bolton
- Children: 3

Rosemary de Brissac Dobson (18 June 1920 – 27 June 2012) was an Australian poet, illustrator, editor and anthologist. She published fourteen volumes of poetry, was published in almost every annual volume of Australian Poetry and has been translated into French and other languages.

The judges of the New South Wales Premier's Literary Awards in 1996 described said: "The level of originality and strength of Rosemary's poetry cannot be underestimated, nor can the contribution she has made to Australian literature. Her literary achievements, especially her poetry, are a testament to her talent and dedication to her art."

== Life ==
Rosemary Dobson was born in Sydney, the second daughter of English-born A.A.G. (Arthur) Dobson and Marjorie (née Caldwell). Her paternal grandfather was Austin Dobson, a poet and essayist. Her father died when she was five years old. She attended the prestigious Frensham School where her mother obtained work as a housemistress. Here she met Australian children's author, Joan Phipson, who had been asked to set up a printing press. She stayed on, after completion of her studies, as an apprentice teacher of art and art history.

When she turned 21, Dobson attended the University of Sydney as a non-degree student. She also studied design with Australian artist, Thea Proctor. She worked as an editor and reader for the publisher Angus and Robertson with Beatrice Davis and Nan McDonald.

She married the publisher Alec Bolton (1926–1996), whom she met while working at Angus and Robertson, in Sydney, and they had three children. During these Sydney years she became well-acquainted with other writers and artists, such as poet Douglas Stewart and his artist wife, Margaret Coen, writer and artist Norman Lindsay, Kenneth Slessor, and James McAuley. They lived in London from 1966 to 1971, during which she travelled widely in Europe and cemented her lifelong interest in art.

The Boltons moved to Canberra in 1971 where Alec Bolton set up the Publications area of the National Library of Australia. In Canberra they were friendly with David Campbell, A. D. Hope, R. F. Brissenden and Dorothy Green. As time wore on, her local circle expanded to include younger writers such as Alan Gould and Geoff Page.

Her older sister, Ruth Dobson, became Australia's first woman career diplomat ambassador.

Rosemary Dobson died in a Canberra nursing home on 27 June 2012.

== Literary career ==
Dobson began writing poetry at the age of seven. Her first collection, In a Convex Mirror, appeared in 1944, and was followed by thirteen more volumes. Her work demonstrates her love of art, antiquity and mythology as well as her experience of motherhood. Hooton describes her work as both consistent and varied: "consistency balanced with variety, reserve with passion, past with present, tradition with innovation, ancient myth with contemporary life, domesticity with culture, and above all Australia with Europe.

Douglas Stewart suggested that she is "a religious person in the deepest and most important sense". In her introduction to her 1973 Selected Poems, Dobson wrote of her aims:

"I hope it will be perceived that the poems presented here are part of a search for something only fugitively glimpsed, a state of grace which one once knew, or imagined, or from which one was turned away. Surely everyone who writes poetry would agree this is part of it - a doomed but urgent wish to express the inexpressible".

In addition to poetry she produced anthologies including two, with poet David Campbell, containing their translations of Russian poetry. She also wrote prose.

== Brindabella Press ==
In 1972, Dobson's husband, Alec Bolton, set up Brindabella Press on which he worked for the rest of his life, working more actively after his retirement from the Library in 1987. Dobson had input as editorial adviser and proof-reader. Both she and Bolton enjoyed the art of the private press in a time when computer type-setting was taking over and producing a more standardised product.

Two early publications from the press, published in 1973, were a small sheet edition of some of Dobson's poems titled Three poems on water-springs and a small book of poems by David Campbell titled Starting from Central Station : a sequence of poems.

== Portraits ==
Norman Lindsay made three portraits of Dobson, the first one at the suggestion of Douglas Stewart who suggested he draw or paint Australian writers. Lindsay's first portrait of Dobson was a drawing, but it was then suggested that he do an oil painting. Lindsay asked her to wear her rose-coloured evening dress. This painting is now owned by the National Library of Australia, as is the dress she wore for the portrait. Dobson sat a third time for Lindsay, at his request and wearing clothes of his suggestion. This portrait is now missing.

Artist Thea Proctor made four drawings of Dobson while Dobson was attending Proctor's art classes.

== Awards ==
- 1946: The Sydney Morning Herald Poetry Prize for The Ship of Ice
- 1966 Myer Award II for Australian Poetry for Cock Crow
- 1977 Australian National University Honorary Convocation Member
- 1979: Christopher Brennan Award
- 1984: Patrick White Award
- 1984: Grace Leven Prize for Poetry for Best Volume of Poetry for the Year The Three Fates & Other Poems
- 1985: Victorian Premier's Prize for Poetry Joint Winner for The Three Fates
- 1986: Association for the Study of Australian Literature Honorary Life Member
- 1987: Officer of the Order of Australia (AO)
- 1996: Australia Council Writer's Emeritus Award
- 1996: University of Sydney Honorary Doctor of Letters
- 2001: The Age Book of the Year Book of the Year and Poetry Awards for Untold Lives & Later Poems
- 2006: NSW Alice Award
- 2006: New South Wales Premier's Literary Awards Special Award

== Bibliography ==
Poetry

- In a Convex Mirror (Dymocks, 1944)
- The Ship of Ice: With Other Poems (Angus & Robertson, 1948)
- Child with a Cockatoo, and Other Poems (Angus & Robertson, 1955)
- Selected Poems (Angus & Robertson, 1963)
- Cock Crow (Angus & Robertson, 1965)
- L'Enfant au Cacatoès trans. M. Diesendorf & L. Dautheuil (Pierre Seghers, 1965)
- Selected Poems (Angus & Robertson, 1973) ISBN 0-207-12809-X
- Greek Coins: A sequence of poems (Brindabella, 1977) ISBN 0-909422-05-2
- Over the Frontier (Angus & Robertson, 1978) ISBN 0-207-13636-X
- The Continuance of Poetry (Brindabella, 1981) ISBN 0-909422-09-5
- The Three Fates & Other Poems (Hale & Iremonger, 1984) ISBN 0-86806-133-6
- Seeing and Believing (NLA, 1990) ISBN 0-642-10500-6
- Collected Poems (Collins/Angus & Robertson, 1991) ISBN 0-207-16864-4
- Untold Lives & Later Poems (Brandl & Schlesinger, 2000) ISBN 1-876040-26-2
- Poems to Hold or Let Go (Ampersand Duck, 2008) ISBN 978-0-9775906-1-2
- Rosemary Dobson Collected (UQP, 2012) ISBN 978-0-7022-3911-3
- Summers end diptych poem

Translation

- Moscow Trefoil: Poems from the Russian of Anna Akhmatova and Osip Mandelstam with David Campbell and Natalie Staples (ANU, 1975) ISBN 0-7081-0141-0
- Seven Russian Poets: Imitations with David Campbell (UQP, 1980) ISBN 0-7022-1418-3

Non-Fiction

- Focus on Ray Crooke (UQP, 1971) ISBN 0-7022-0702-0
- A World of Difference: Australian poetry and painting in the 1940s (Wentworth Press, 1973) ISBN 0-85587-064-8

Selected list of poems

Title	Year	First published	Reprinted/collected in
"The Ship of Ice"	1947	The Sydney Morning Herald, 15, 22 Feb and 1 Mar 1947	The Ship of Ice : With Other Poems; Angus & Robertson, 1948
"Child with a Cockatoo"	1949	Meanjin, Spring 1949	Child with a Cockatoo, and Other Poems, Angus and Robertson, 1955, pp. 18–19
"The Three Fates"	1978	Antaeus, No. 30-31	The Three Fates & Other Poems; Hale and Iremonger, 1984, p. 9

== Legacy ==
The Rosemary Dobson Award was awarded as part of the ACT Poetry Award by the ACT Government between 2005 and 2011, for an unpublished poem by an Australian poet.

== Notes ==
- Adelaide, Debra (1988) Australian Women Writers: A Bibliographic Guide, London, Pandora
- Anderson, D.J. (1996) Citation for Honorary Award to Rosemary Dobson AO
- Bolton, Rosemary Dobson (2005) "The rose-coloured dress", National Library of Australia News, XV (9): 7-9, June 2005
- Hooton, Joy (ed) (2000a) Rosemary Dobson: A Celebration, National Library of Australia ISBN 0-642-10728-9
- Hooton, Joy (2000b) "Rosemary Dobson: A Life of Making Poetry" in Hooton, Joy (ed) (2000) Rosemary Dobson: A celebration, National Library of Australia ISBN 0-642-10728-9
- NSW Premier's Literary Awards Judges Comments
- Smith, Graeme Kinross (1980) Australian Writers, West Melbourne, Nelson
- Tranter, John Ernest. "Interview: Rosemary Dobson in conversation with John Tranter, 8 December 2004." 5,800 words, illustrated.
- Wilde, W., Hooton, J. & Andrews, B (1994) The Oxford Companion of Australian Literature 2nd ed. South Melbourne, Oxford University Press
