= Oodgeroo Noonuccal =

Aboriginal Australian artist, teacher and activist (1920–1993)

Oodgeroo Noonuccal (Kath Walker)
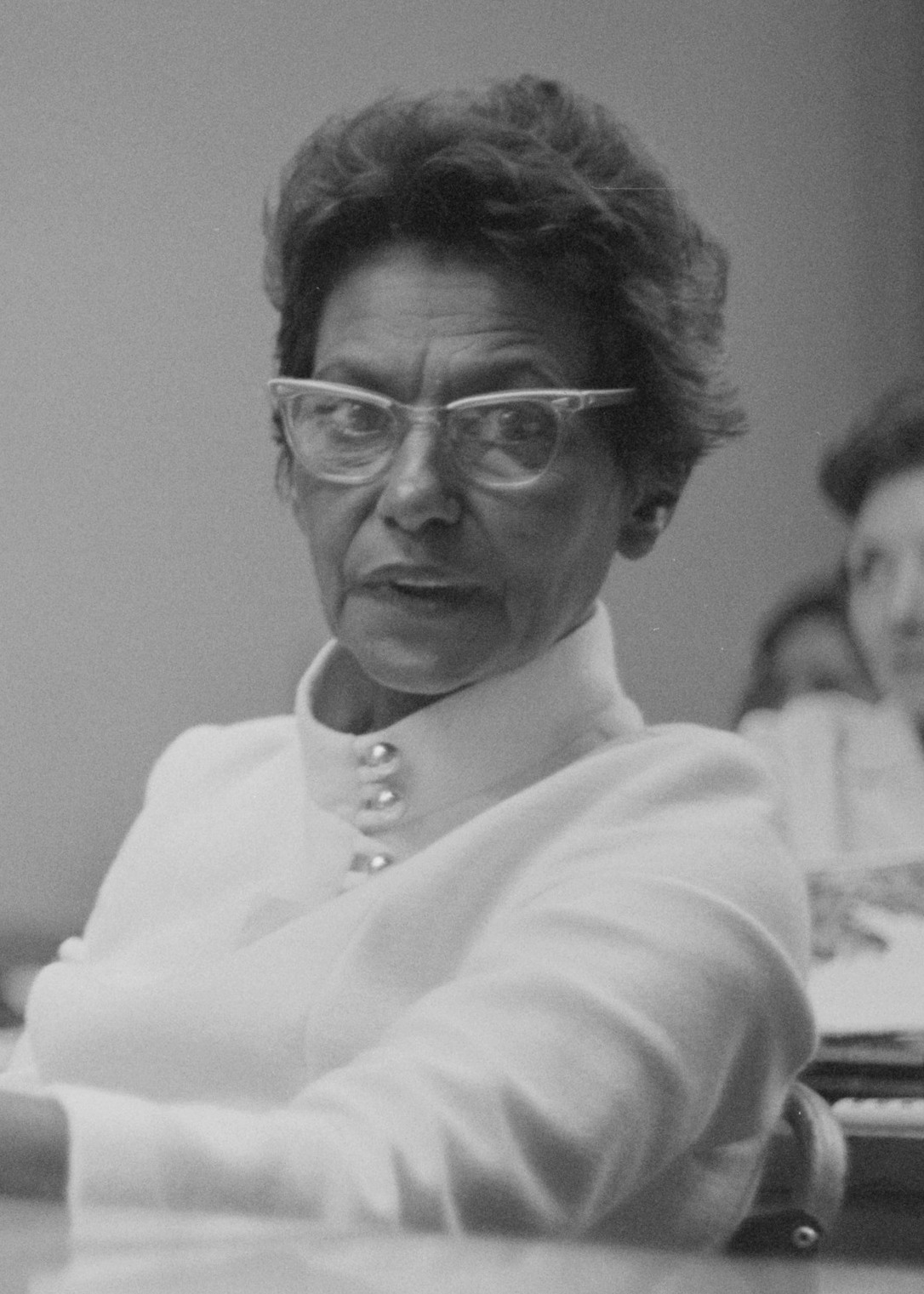
- Oodgeroo Noonuccal in 1970
- Born: Kathleen Jean Mary Ruska; 3 November 1920; Bulimba, Queensland, Australia
- Died: 16 September 1993 (aged 72); Brisbane, Queensland, Australia
- Other names: Kath Walker, Kathleen Ruska
- Education: Bookkeeping, typing, shorthand
- Occupations: Australian Army officer, writer, teacher, poet
- Employer(s): Australian Women's Army Service, Noonuccal-Nughie Education Cultural Centre
- Known for: Poetry, acting, writing, Aboriginal rights activism
- Political party: Communist Party of Australia; Australian Labor Party; Australian Democrats
- Board member of: Federal Council for the Advancement of Aboriginal and Torres Strait Islanders (FCAATSI)
- Spouse: Bruce Walker
- Children: Denis Walker; Vivian Walker
- Parent(s): Ted Ruska and Lucy Ruska

Oodgeroo Noonuccal (/ˈʊdɡəruː ˈnuːnəkəl/ UUD-gə-roo NOO-nə-kəl; born Kathleen Jean Mary Ruska; 3 November 1920 – 16 September 1993), earlier known as Kath Walker, was an Aboriginal Australian political activist, artist and educator, who campaigned for Aboriginal rights. Noonuccal was best known for her poetry, and was the first Aboriginal Australian to publish a book of verse. Her first book of poetry, We Are Going, was published in 1964.

== Early life ==
Noonuccal was born the second youngest of 7 children on 3 November 1920 in Bulimba, Queensland. She was named Kathleen Jean Mary Ruska at birth and was the daughter of Lucy (née McCullough) and Edward (Ted) Ruska.

Her father, a labourer, was a member of the Nunukul people from around Moreton Bay who also had Filipino and German ancestry. Her mother, Lucy, was the daughter of a Scottish migrant and a Wanggamala-Pitapita woman from Marion Downs Station in western Queensland. Lucy was removed from her family at the age of ten and trained as a housemaid. She became pregnant to a white man at the age of fourteen and transferred as an inmate to the Holy Cross Laundry in Brisbane. Lucy met Edward Ruska on a trip to Stradbroke Island and they subsequently married.

Noonuccal spent her early years at the One Mile settlement on North Stradbroke Island, on the outskirts of Dunwich. She attended Dunwich State School, leaving at the age of thirteen in the aftermath of the Great Depression as the family could not afford to send her to nursing school like her older sister.

Like many Aboriginal girls, Noonuccal was recruited into domestic service in Brisbane. She was forced to live separated from her Indigenous culture and to follow the orders of the women she served. Noonuccal’s story serves as a demonstration of the assimilation many Aboriginal girls experienced.

== Activism and political candidacies ==
Noonuccal joined the Australian Women's Army Service in 1942, after her two brothers were captured by the Japanese at the fall of Singapore. Noonuccal enlisted, in her own words, because she felt guilty that her brothers had been taken as prisoners of war. Additionally, many Indigenous Australians escaped from the restrictions of the various Australian "Protection Acts" by enlisting, which provided them with an education that was otherwise denied—Noonuccal included. Enlisting allowed for her to escape the domestic servitude in Brisbane and the Protection Acts. She served as a signaller in Brisbane, she met many black American soldiers, as well as European Australians. These contacts helped to lay the foundations for her later advocacy of Aboriginal rights. During the 1940s, she joined the Communist Party of Australia because it was the only party which opposed the White Australia policy.

During the 1960s Walker emerged as a prominent political activist and writer. She was Queensland state secretary of the Federal Council for the Advancement of Aborigines and Torres Strait Islanders (FCAATSI), and was involved in a number of other political organisations. She was a key figure in the campaign for the reform of the Australian constitution to allow Aboriginal people full citizenship, lobbying Prime Minister Robert Menzies in 1965, and his successor Harold Holt in 1966. At one deputation in 1963, she taught Robert Menzies a lesson in the realities of Aboriginal life. After the Prime Minister offered the deputation an alcoholic drink, he was startled to learn from her that in Queensland he could be jailed for this.

On 13 June 1970, Noonuccal (as Kathleen Jean Mary Walker) received the award of Member of the Order of the British Empire (Civil) (MBE) for her services to the community. In December 1987, she announced she would return her MBE in protest over the Australian Government's intention to celebrate the Australian Bicentenary which she described as "200 years of sheer unadulterated humiliation" of Aboriginal people. She also announced she would change her name to Oodgeroo Noonuccal, with Oodgeroo meaning "paperbark tree" and Noonuccal (also spelt Nunukul) being her people's name.

In 1983, Noonuccal announced she would stand as an independent candidate for the Senate in Queensland at the 1983 federal election. She unsuccessfully attempted to recruit Senator Neville Bonner to join her on a pro-Aboriginal ticket, following his resignation from the Liberal Party. She subsequently withdrew her candidacy, stating she and Bonner were likely to split the vote. Later in the year Noonuccal ran in the 1983 Queensland state election for the Australian Democrats political party in the seat of Redlands. Her campaign focused around policies promoting the environment and Aboriginal rights. Receiving 6.4% of the primary vote, she was not elected.

In 1988, she officially changed her name to Oodgeroo Noonuccal. While often overlooked as simply a personal choice, this was an intentional action by Noonuccal to connect closer with her heritage and culture, while simultaneously being an act of activism by rejecting the White Australia identity that had been forced on her. Additionally, the name change reflects more than just her culture. “Oodgeroo” means “paperbark tree” and alludes to her career and passion as a writer. “Noonuccal” is the name of her people, who lived on and took care of the land for 20,000 years.

== Writing ==
She wrote many books, beginning with We Are Going (1964), the first book to be published by an Aboriginal woman. The title poem concludes:

The scrubs are gone, the hunting and the laughter.
The eagle is gone, the emu and the kangaroo are gone from this place.
The bora ring is gone.
The corroboree is gone.
And we are going.

This first book of poetry was extraordinarily successful, selling out in several editions, and setting Oodgeroo well on the way to be Australia's highest-selling poet alongside C. J. Dennis. Critics' responses were mixed, with some questioning whether Oodgeroo, as an Aboriginal person, could really have written it herself. Others were disturbed by the activism of the poems, and found that they were "propaganda" rather than what they considered to be real poetry. Oodgeroo embraced the idea of her poetry as propaganda, and described her own style as "sloganistic, civil-writerish, plain and simple." She wanted to convey pride in her Aboriginality to the broadest possible audience, and to popularise equality and Aboriginal rights through her writing.

Her writings also included themes of ecological activism, highlighting the wisdom of previous Aboriginal Australians and how they cared for the land. Other themes contained in her poems include Aboriginal storytelling, nature, spirituality, and identity. The impacts of colonialism are often present in her writings, as her poetry aimed to strike at the “white ego” and to remind them of what atrocities had been committed against the land and its people.

Walker was inaugural president of the committee of the Aboriginal Publications Foundation, which published the magazine Identity in the 1970s.

In 1972 she bought a property on North Stradbroke Island (also known as Minjerribah), which she called Moongalba ("sitting-down place"), and established the Noonuccal-Nughie Education and Cultural Centre. In 1977, a documentary about her, called Shadow Sister, was released. It was directed and produced by Frank Heimans and photographed by Geoff Burton. It describes her return to Moongalba and her life there. In a 1987 interview, she described her education program at Moongalba, saying that over "the last seventeen years I've had 26,500 children on the island. White kids as well as black. And if there were green ones, I'd like them too ... I'm colour blind, you see. I teach them about Aboriginal culture. I teach them about the balance of nature." Oodgeroo was committed to education at all levels, and collaborated with universities in creating programs for teacher education that would lead to better teaching in Australian schools.

Noonuccal at Brisbane's King George Square, March 1975

In 1974 Noonuccal was aboard a British Airways flight that was hijacked by terrorists campaigning for Palestinian liberation. The hijackers shot a crew member and a passenger and forced the plane to fly to several different African destinations. During her three days in captivity, she used a blunt pencil and an airline sickbag from the seat pocket to write two poems, "Commonplace" and "Yusuf (Hijacker)".

In 1986 she played the part of Eva in Bruce Beresford's film, The Fringe Dwellers.

== Personal life and family ==
On 8 May 1943 she married childhood friend and Brisbane waterside worker Bruce Walker at the Methodist Church, West End, Brisbane. The couple had one son Denis, but they later separated.

She worked for Raphael and Phyllis Cilento and had a second son, Vivian Charles Walker, born in Brisbane in 1953, with the Cilentos' son Raphael Junior. In 1970 Vivian won the first Aboriginal scholarship to attend the National Institute of Dramatic Art, and worked in the performing and visual arts. He lived and worked abroad for many years before returning to Australia, where his talent was fostered by the Aboriginal National Theatre Trust, which was established in 1988. In 1988 he adopted the Indigenous name Kabul Oodgeroo Noonuccal, kabul meaning carpet snake, and in the same year co-authored The Rainbow Serpent with his mother, for Expo 88. In March 1990 he directed the world premiere of Munjong, by Richard Walley, at the Victorian Arts Centre. He died on 20 February 1991 to AIDS-related complications, at age 38. Noonuccal was described as “heart-struck but resolute” after his death, continuing to pour more of her life to writing, protesting, and teaching.

Oodgeroo Noonuccal died from cancer on 16 September 1993 at the Repatriation General Hospital at Greenslopes, Brisbane, aged 72 years, and was buried at Moongalba on North Stradbroke Island.

== In culture ==
A play has been written by Sam Watson entitled Oodgeroo: Bloodline to Country, based on Oodgeroo Noonuccal's real-life experience as an Aboriginal woman on board a flight hijacked by Palestinian terrorists on her way home from a committee meeting in Nigeria for the World Black and African Festival of Arts and Culture.

Noonuccal's poetry has been set to music by numerous composers, including Christopher Gordon, Clare Maclean, Stephen Leek, Andrew Ford, Paul Stanhope, Mary Mageau, and Joseph Twist.

Noonuccal’s poetry was a method for her to reach white audiences with Aboriginal storytelling. Her poems, charged with political advocacy, spirituality, and Aboriginal identity reflected a traditional Aboriginal storytelling framework, were presented in a Western format of art, utilised as a tool for decolonialisation as it catered to multiple demographics.

== Recognition ==
Oodgeroo won several literary awards, including the Mary Gilmore Medal (1970), the Jessie Litchfield Award (1975), and the FAW Patricia Weickhardt Award to an Aboriginal Writer (1985).

She received an honorary Doctorate of Letters from Macquarie University for her contribution to Australian literature in 1988. She was also made an honorary Doctor of the university by Griffith University in 1989, and was awarded a further honorary Doctor of Letters degree in 1991 by Monash University. In 1992, Oodgeroo Noonuccal received an honorary Doctorate from the Faculty of Education Queensland University of Technology for both her contribution to literature and in recognition of her work in the field of education.

In 1979, she was awarded the Sixth Annual Oscar at the Micheaux Awards Ceremony, hosted by the US Black Filmmakers Hall of Fame, and in the same year received the International Acting Award for the film Shadow Sisters.

She was appointed a Member of the Order of the British Empire in 1970, but returned the award in 1987 in protest at the Australian Bicentenary celebrations in order to make a political statement about the condition of her people.

In 1985, she was named Aboriginal of the Year by the National Aborigines Day Observance Committee (NADOC, now NAIDOC), an honour bestowed by Indigenous people.

In 1991, a commemorative plaque with her name on it was one of the first installed on Sydney Writers Walk.

In 1992 Queensland University of Technology (QUT) awarded her an honorary doctorate from the Faculty of Education recognising her contributions to literature and education. In 2006 the university renamed their Aboriginal and Torres Strait Islander Support Unit as the Oodgeroo Unit in her honour. The university also has the Oodgeroo Scholarship Program which provides undergraduate and postgraduate scholarships for Aboriginal and Torres Strait Islander students.

In 2001, she was posthumously inducted onto the Victorian Honour Roll of Women. In 2009 as part of the Q150 celebrations, she was announced as one of the Q150 Icons of Queensland for her role as an "Influential Artist".

In 2016 the Queensland Poetry Festival introduced an Indigenous program which included the inaugural Oodgeroo Noonuccal Indigenous Poetry Prize.

The electoral district of Oodgeroo created in the 2017 Queensland state electoral redistribution was named after her.

== Bibliography ==
Poetry collections

- Son of Mine (To Dennis) (1960)
- Municipal Gum (1960)
- We are Going: Poems (1964)
- The Dawn is at Hand (1966)
- Ballad of the Totebrush (1966)
- The Past (1970)
- White Australia (1970)
- All One Race (1970)
- Freedom (1970)
- Then and Now (1970)
- Last of His Tribe (1970)
- My People: A Kath Walker collection (1970)
- No More Boomerang (1985)
- Then and now (1985)
- Kath Walker in China (1988)
- The Unhappy Race (1992
- The Colour Bar (1990)
- Let Us Not Be Bitter (1990)
- Oodgeroo (1994)

For children

- Stradbroke Dreamtime (1972)
- Father Sky and Mother Earth (1981)
- Little Fella (1986)
- The Rainbow Serpent (1988)

Non fiction

- Towards a Global Village in the Southern Hemisphere (1989)
- The Spirit of Australia (1989)
- Australian Legends And Landscapes (1990)
- Australia's Unwritten History: More legends of our land (1992)
- Oodgeroo of the tribe Nunukul in The Republicanism Debate (1993)

Selected list of poems

Title	Year	First published	Reprinted/collected in
"We Are Going"	1960	Tribune, 2 May 1962	We Are Going: Poems, Jacaranda Press, 1964, p. 25
"No More Boomerang"	1966		The Dawn is at Hand, Jacaranda Press, 1966, pp. 26–27
"Gifts"	1966		The Dawn is at Hand, Jacaranda Press, 1966, p. 37
