= Judith Wright Award =

Former Australian poetry award

The Judith Wright Award, also known as the Judith Wright Prize, was awarded annually as part of the ACT Poetry Award between 2005 and 2011 for a book of poems published the previous year in book form by an Australian author. It was awarded for a published collection by an Australian poet.

== History ==
The ACT Poetry Award for unpublished poets was awarded in 2003 and 2004 by the ACT Government. From 2005 to 2011, there were four prizes awarded: the Rosemary Dobson Award, the David Campbell Award, the Judith Wright Award and the Alec Bolton Award.

In 2012, the Government reviewed the ACT Poetry Prize, and developed three new initiatives: the ACT Poetry Prize for a single poem, a Centenary Poetry in ACTION program and Youth Poetry Slams, to begin in ACT schools in 2013. The last ACT poetry prize appears to have been awarded in 2013.

== Winners ==
=== 2010 ===
- Winner Peter Boyle, Apocrypha (Vagabond Press)
- Highly Commended Jordie Albiston, the sonnet according to "m" (John Leonard Press)
- Commended Felicity Plunkett, Vanishing Point (University of Queensland Press)
- Emma Jones, The Striped World (Faber & Faber)
- Shortlisted Philip Hammial, Skin Theory (Puncher & Wattmann)
- Susan Hawthorne, Earth's Breath (Spinifex Press)

=== 2009 ===
- Winner: Sarah Holland-Batt, Aria (University of Queensland Press)
- Highly Commended: Jan Owen, Poems 1980 - 2008 (John Leonard Press)
- Shortlisted: David Brooks The Balcony (University of Queensland Press)
- Martin Harrison Wild Bees: New and Selected Poems (University of Western Australia Press)
- Marcella Polain Therapy Like Fish: New and Selected Poems (John Leonard Press)
- Peter Steele White Knight with Beebox: New & Selected Poems (John Leonard Press)

=== 2008 ===
- Winner: Barry Hill, Necessity: Poems 1996-2006 (soi3 modern poets)
- Highly Commended: J. S. Harry Not Finding Wittgenstein (Giramondo)
- Commended: Meredith Wattison Basket of Sunlight (Puncher & Wattmann)
- Petra White The Incoming Tide (John Leonard Press)
- Shortlisted: Elizabeth Campbell Letters to the Tremulous Hand (John Leonard Press)
- Brendan Ryan A paddock in his head (Five Islands Press)

=== 2007 ===
- Winner: Diane Fahey Sea Wall and River Light (Five Islands Press)
- Winner: S. K. Kelen Earthly Delights (Pandanus)
- Highly Commended: Robyn Rowland Silence and its Tongues
- Michelle Cahill The Accidental Cage

=== 2006 ===
- Winner: Susan Hampton The Kindly Ones (Five Islands Press)
- Shortlisted: Adrian Caesar High Wire
- Alan Gould The Past Completes Me: Selected Poems 1973 – 2003
- Jaya Savige Latecomers

== See also ==
- Australian literature
- List of poetry awards
- List of years in poetry
- List of years in literature
