= Kenneth Slessor Prize for Poetry =

Poetry award in New South Wales, Australia

The Kenneth Slessor Prize for Poetry is awarded annually as part of the New South Wales Premier's Literary Awards for a book of collected poems or for a single poem of substantial length published in book form. It is named after Kenneth Slessor (1901–1971).

The prize currently comes with a A$30,000 cash award.

== Winners and shortlists ==
=== 2020 and after ===
Kenneth Slessor Prize for Poetry winners (2020–)
| Year | Author | Title | Publisher | Result |
|---|---|---|---|---|
| 2026 | Jill Jones | How to Emerge | Vagabond Press | Winner |
| 2026 | Kay L. Are | A Sonogrammar | Puncher and Wattmann | Shortlist |
| 2026 | Andrew Brooks | Year of the Ox | Cordite Press | Shortlist |
| 2026 | Debbie Lim | Bathypelagia | Cordite Press | Shortlist |
| 2026 | Shey Marque | The Hum Hearers | UWA Publishing | Shortlist |
| 2026 | Kaya Ortiz | Past & Parallel Lives | UWA Publishing | Shortlist |
| 2025 | Hasib Hourani | rock flight | Giramondo Publishing | Winner |
| 2025 | Chris Andrews | The Oblong Plot | Puncher and Wattmann | Shortlist |
| 2025 | Nam Le | 36 Ways of Writing a Vietnamese Poem | Simon and Schuster, Australia | Shortlist |
| 2025 | Jeanine Leane | Gawimarra: Gathering | University of Queensland Press | Shortlist |
| 2025 | Kate Middleton | Television | Giramondo Publishing | Shortlist |
| 2024 | Tais Rose Wae | Riverbed Sky Songs | Vagabond Press | Winner |
| 2024 | Pooja Mittal Biswas | Hunger and Predation | Cordite Press | Shortlist |
| 2024 | Willo Drummond | Moon Wrasse | Puncher and Wattmann | Shortlist |
| 2024 | Libby Hart | Burn | Lepus Print | Shortlist |
| 2024 | Caitlin Maling | Spore or Seed | Fremantle Press | Shortlist |
| 2024 | Omar Sakr | Non-Essential Work | University of Queensland Press | Shortlist |
| 2023 | Kim Cheng Boey | The Singer and Other Poems | Cordite Press | Winner |
| 2023 | Adam Aitken | Revenants | Giramondo Publishing | Shortlist |
| 2023 | Pam Brown | Stasis Shuffle | Hunter Publishers | Shortlist |
| 2023 | Lisa Gorton | Miribilia | Giramondo Publishing | Shortlist |
| 2023 | Sarah Holland-Batt | The Jaguar | University of Queensland Press | Shortlist |
| 2023 | Marjon Mossammaparast | And to Ecstacy | Upswell Publishing | Shortlist |
| 2022 | Dan Disney | accelerations & inertias | Vagabond Press | Winner |
| 2022 | Eunice Andrada | Take Care | Giramondo Publishing | Shortlist |
| 2022 | Evelyn Araluen | Dropbear | Giramondo Publishing | Shortlist |
| 2022 | Eileen Chong | A Thousand Crimson Blooms | University of Queensland Press | Shortlist |
| 2022 | John Kinsella | Supervivid Depastoralism | Vagabond Press | Shortlist |
| 2022 | Bella Li | Theory of Colours | Vagabond Press | Shortlist |
| 2021 | Ellen van Neerven | Throat | University of Queensland Press | Winner |
| 2021 | Jordie Albiston | Element: The Atomic Weight & Radius of Love | Puncher and Wattmann | Shortlist |
| 2021 | Rebecca Jessen | Ask Me About the Future | University of Queensland Press | Shortlist |
| 2021 | Jill Jones | A History of What I’ll Become | UWA Publishing | Shortlist |
| 2021 | Jaya Savige | Change Machine | University of Queensland Press | Shortlist |
| 2020 | Peter Boyle | Enfolded in the Wings of a Great Darkness | Vagabond Press | Winner |
| 2020 | Joanne Burns | apparently | Giramondo Publishing | Shortlist |
| 2020 | Zenobia Frost | After the Demolition | Cordite Press | Shortlist |
| 2020 | Lisa Gorton | Empirical | Giramondo Publishing | Shortlist |
| 2020 | Natalie Harkin | Archival-Poetics | Vagabond Press | Shortlist |
| 2020 | David Malouf | An Open Book | University of Queensland Press | Shortlist |

=== 2010–2019 ===
Kenneth Slessor Prize for Poetry winners (2010–2019)
| Year | Author | Title | Publisher | Result |
|---|---|---|---|---|
| 2019 | Judith Bishop | Interval | University of Queensland Press | Winner |
| 2019 | Michael Farrell | I Love Poetry | Giramondo Publishing | Shortlist |
| 2019 | Penelope Layland | Things I’ve Thought To Tell You Since I Saw You Last | Recent Work Press | Shortlist |
| 2019 | Philip Neilsen | Wildlife of Berlin | UWA Publishing | Shortlist |
| 2019 | Mark Reid | Blindside | Puncher and Wattmann | Shortlist |
| 2019 | Chris Wallace-Crabbe | Rondo | Carcanet | Shortlist |
| 2018 | Bella Li | Argosy | Vagabond Press | Winner |
| 2018 | Adam Aitken | Archipelago | Vagabond Press | Shortlist |
| 2018 | Jordie Albiston | Euclid's dog: 100 algorithmic poems | GloriaSMH | Shortlist |
| 2018 | Rico Craig | Bone Ink | Guillotine Press | Shortlist |
| 2018 | Nguyễn Tiên Hoàng | Captive and Temporal | Vagabond Press | Shortlist |
| 2018 | Omar Sakr | These Wild Houses | Cordite Press | Shortlist |
| 2017 | Peter Boyle | Ghostspeaking | Vagabond Press | Winner |
| 2017 | Paul Hetherington | Burnt Umber | UWA Publishing | Shortlist |
| 2017 | Jill Jones | Breaking the Days | Whitmore Press | Shortlist |
| 2017 | Antigone Kefala | Fragments | Giramondo Publishing | Shortlist |
| 2017 | John Kinsella | Firebreaks: Poems | W. W. Norton | Shortlist |
| 2017 | Ellen van Neerven | Comfort Foot | University of Queensland Press | Shortlist |
| 2016 | Joanne Burns | brush | Giramondo Publishing | Winner |
| 2016 | Lionel Fogarty | Eelahroo (Long Ago), Nyah (Looking), Möbö-Möbö (Future) | Vagabond Press | Shortlist |
| 2016 | Sarah Holland-Batt | The Hazards | University of Queensland Press | Shortlist |
| 2016 | Meredith Wattison | terra bravura | Puncher and Wattmann | Shortlist |
| 2016 | Chloe Wilson | Not Fox Nor Axe | Hunter Publishers | Shortlist |
| 2016 | Ouyang Yu | Fainting with Freedom | Five islands Press | Shortlist |
| 2015 | David Malouf | Earth Hour | University of Queensland Press | Winner |
| 2015 | Michael Aiken | A Vicious Example | Grand Parade Poets | Shortlist |
| 2015 | Judith Beveridge | Devadatta's Poems | Giramondo Publishing | Shortlist |
| 2015 | Anne Elvey | Kin | Five Islands Press | Shortlist |
| 2015 | Libby Hart | Wild | Pitt Street Poetry | Shortlist |
| 2015 | John Mateer | Unbelievers, or The Moor | Giramondo Publishing | Shortlist |
| 2014 | Fiona Hile | Novelties | Hunter Publishers | Winner |
| 2014 | Justin Clemens | The Mundiad | Hunter Publishers | Shortlist |
| 2014 | Diane Fahey | The Stone Garden: Poems from Clare | Clouds of Magellan | Shortlist |
| 2014 | Liam Ferney | Boom | Grand Parade Poets | Shortlist |
| 2014 | Kate Middleton | Ephemeral Waters | Giramondo Publishing | Shortlist |
| 2014 | Jessica Wilkinson | Marionette: A Biography of Miss Marion Davies | Vagabond Press | Shortlist |
| 2013 | Ali Cobby Eckermann | Ruby Moonlight | Magabala Books | Winner |
| 2013 | Kate Fagan | First Light | Giramondo Publishing | Shortlist |
| 2013 | Michael Farrell | Open Sesame | Giramondo Publishing | Shortlist |
| 2013 | Anthony Lawrence | The Welfare of my Enemy | Puncher & Wattman | Shortlist |
| 2013 | Kate Lilley | Ladylike | UWA Publishing | Shortlist |
| 2013 | Vivian Smith | Here, There and Elsewhere | Giramondo Publishing | Shortlist |
| 2012 | Gig Ryan | New and Selected Poems | Giramondo Publishing | Winner |
| 2012 | Ken Bolton | Sly Mongoose | Puncher and Wattman | Shortlist |
| 2012 | Susan Hawthorne | Cow | Spinifex Press | Shortlist |
| 2012 | John Mateer | Southern Barbarians | Giramondo Publishing | Shortlist |
| 2012 | Claire Potter | Swallow | Five Islands Press | Shortlist |
| 2012 | Tracy Ryan | The Argument | Fremantle Press | Shortlist |
| 2011 | Jennifer Maiden | Pirate Rain | Giramondo Publishing | Winner |
| 2011 | Susan Bradley Smith | Supermodernprayerbook | Salt Publishing | Shortlist |
| 2011 | Andy Jackson | Among The Regulars | Papertiger Media Inc | Shortlist |
| 2011 | Jill Jones | Dark Bright Doors | Wakefield Press | Shortlist |
| 2011 | Anna Kerdijk Nicholson | Possession | Five Island Press | Shortlist |
| 2011 | Andy Kissane | Out to Lunch | Puncher and Wattmann | Shortlist |
| 2010 | Jordie Albiston | The Sonnet According to "M" | John Leonard Press | Winner |
| 2010 | Emily Ballou | The Darwin Poems | UWA Publishing | Shortlist |
| 2010 | Judith Beveridge | Storm and Honey | Giramondo Publishing | Shortlist |
| 2010 | Emma Jones | The Striped World | Faber | Shortlist |
| 2010 | Morgan Yasbincek | White Camel | John Leonard Press | Shortlist |

=== 2004–2009 ===
Kenneth Slessor Prize for Poetry winners (2000–2009)
| Year | Author | Title | Publisher | Result |
|---|---|---|---|---|
| 2009 | LK Holt | Man Wolf Man | John Leonard Press | Winner |
| 2009 | Michael Brennan | Unanimous Night | Salt Publishing | Shortlist |
| 2009 | David Brooks | The Balcony | University of Queensland Press | Shortlist |
| 2009 | Sarah Holland-Batt | Aria | University of Queensland Press | Shortlist |
| 2009 | Kerry Leves | A Shrine To Lata Mangeshkar | Puncher & Wattman | Shortlist |
| 2009 | Alan Wearne | The Australian Popular Songbook | Giramondo Publishing | Shortlist |
| 2008 | Kathryn Lomer | Two Kinds of Silence | University of Queensland Press | Winner |
| 2008 | Joanne Burns | an illustrated history of dairies | Giramondo Publishing | Shortlist |
| 2008 | Brook Emery | Uncommon Light | Five Islands Press | Shortlist |
| 2008 | Peter Kirkpatrick | Westering | Puncher and Wattmann | Shortlist |
| 2008 | David Malouf | Typewriter Music | University of Queensland Press | Shortlist |
| 2008 | Phyllis Perlstone | The Edge of Everything | Puncher and Wattmann | Shortlist |
| 2007 | John Tranter | Urban Myths | University of Queensland Press | Winner |
| 2007 | Robert Adamson | The Goldfinches of Baghdad | Flood Editions | Shortlist |
| 2007 | Laurie Duggan | The Passenger | University of Queensland Press | Shortlist |
| 2007 | Les Murray | The Biplane Houses | Black Inc. | Shortlist |
| 2007 | Simon West | First Names | Puncher and Wattmann | Shortlist |
| 2007 | Fay Zwicky | Picnic | Giramondo Publishing | Shortlist |
| 2006 | Jaya Savige | Latecomers | University of Queensland Press | Winner |
| 2006 | Aidan Coleman | Avenues & Runways | Brandl & Schlesinger | Shortlist |
| 2006 | Susan Hampton | The Kindly Ones | Five Islands Press | Shortlist |
| 2006 | Jill Jones | Broken/Open | Salt Publishing | Shortlist |
| 2006 | Penelope Layland | Suburban Anatomy | Pandanus Books | Shortlist |
| 2006 | David McCooey | Blister Pack | Salt Publishing | Shortlist |
| 2005 | Samuel Wagan Watson | Smoke Encrypted Whispers | University of Queensland Press | Winner |
| 2005 | M. T. C. Cronin | < More or Less Than> 1–100 | Shearsman Books Ltd | Shortlist |
| 2005 | Lidija Cvetkovic | War is Not the Season for Figs | University of Queensland Press | Shortlist |
| 2005 | John Kinsella | Doppler Effect | Salt Publishing | Shortlist |
| 2005 | Dipti Saravanamuttu | The Colosseum | Five Islands Press | Shortlist |
| 2005 | Alan Wearne | The Lovemakers Book Two: Money and Nothing | ABC Books | Shortlist |
| 2004 | Pam Brown | Dear Deliria: New & Selected Poems | Salt Publishing | Winner |
| 2004 | Jordie Albiston | The Fall | White Crane Press | Shortlist |
| 2004 | M. T. C. Cronin | beautiful, unfinished | Salt Publishing | Shortlist |
| 2004 | Brook Emery | Misplaced Heart | Five Islands Press | Shortlist |
| 2004 | Philip Hammial | In the Year of Our Lord Slaughter's Children | Island Press | Shortlist |
| 2004 | John Tranter | Studio Moon | Salt Publishing | Shortlist |

=== 2003 ===
- Winner: Jill Jones – Screens Jets Heaven
- Alison Croggon – Attempts at Being
- Kate Lilley – Versary
- Emma Lew – Anything the Landlord Touches
- Sarah Day – New and Selected Poems
- Robert Gray – Afterimages

=== 2002 ===
- Winner: Alan Wearne – The Lovemakers, Penguin Books Australia
- Robert Adamson – Mulberry Leaves: New & Selected Poems: 1970–2001, Paper Bark Press
- Martin Harrison – Summer, Paper Bark Press
- Dorothy Hewett – Halfway Up the Mountain, Fremantle Arts Centre Press
- Bronwyn Lea – Flight Animals, University of Queensland Press
- Gig Ryan – Heroic Money, Brandl & Schlesinger
- John Tranter – Ultra, Brandl & Schlesinger

=== 2001 ===
- Winner: Ken Taylor – Africa, Five Islands Press
- Jennifer Compton – Blue, Ginninderra Press
- Brook Emery – and dug my fingers in the sand, Five Islands Press
- Philip Hammial – Bread, Black Pepper
- J. S. Harry – Sun Shadow, Moon Shadow, Vagabond Press
- Wendy Jenkins – Rogue Equations, Fremantle Arts Centre Press

=== 2000 ===
- Winner: Jennifer Maiden – Mines, Paper Bark Press/Australian Humanities Research Foundation
- Richard James Allen – Thursday's Fictions, Five Islands Press
- M. T. C. Cronin – Everything Holy, Balcones International Press
- Jennifer Harrison – Dear B, Black Pepper
- Kevin Hart – Wicked Heat, Paper Bark Press
- John Millett – Iceman, Five Islands Press

=== 1999 and before ===
Award winners:

Kenneth Slessor Prize for Poetry winners (1980–1999)
| Year | Author | Title | Publisher | Result |
|---|---|---|---|---|
| 1999 | Lee Cataldi | Race Against Time | Penguin Books Australia | Winner |
| 1998 | no awards were presented | | | |
| 1997 | Anthony Lawrence | The Viewfinder | University of Queensland Press | Winner |
| 1997 | Alison Clark | About Desire and Other Poems | Heinemann | Shortlist |
| 1997 | Emma Lew | The Wild Reply | Black Pepper | Shortlist |
| 1997 | Les Murray | Subhuman Redneck Poems | Duffy and Snellgrove | Shortlist |
| 1997 | Geoff Page | The Secret | Heinemann | Shortlist |
| 1997 | Peter Porter | Dragons in Their Pleasant Palaces | Oxford University Press | Shortlist |
| 1996 | Eric Beach | Weeping for Lost Babylon | Angus and Robertson | Winner |
| 1996 | J. S. Harry | Selected Poems | Penguin Books Australia | Winner |
| 1995 | Peter Boyle | Coming Home From the World | Five Islands Press | Winner |
| 1994 | Barry Hill | Ghosting William Buckley | Heinemann | Winner |
| 1993 | Les Murray | Translations from the Natural World | Isabella Press | Winner |
| 1992 | Elizabeth Riddell | Selected Poems | Collins Angus & Robertson | Winner |
| 1991 | Jennifer Maiden | The Winter Baby | Collins Angus & Robertson | Winner |
| 1990 | Robert Adamson | The Clean Dark | Paper Bark Press | Winner |
| 1989 | John Tranter | Under Berlin | University of Queensland Press | Winner |
| 1988 | Judith Beveridge | The Domesticity of Giraffes | Black Lightning Press | Winner |
| 1987 | Philip Hodgins | Blood and Bone | Angus & Robertson | Winner |
| 1986 | Robert Gray | Selected Poems 1963-1983 | Angus & Robertson | Winner |
| 1985 | Kevin Hart | Your Shadow | Angus & Robertson | Winner |
| 1984 | Les Murray | The People's Otherworld : Poems | Angus & Robertson | Winner |
| 1983 | Vivian Smith | Tide Country | Angus & Robertson | Winner |
| 1982 | Fay Zwicky | Kaddish and Other Poems | University of Queensland Press | Winner |
| 1981 | Alan Gould | Astral Sea | Angus & Robertson | Winner |
| 1980 | David Campbell | The Man in the Honeysuckle | Angus & Robertson | Winner |

== See also ==
- Australian literature
- List of poetry awards
- List of years in poetry
- List of years in literature
