= Gargoyle Poets Series =

Series of Australian poetry chapbooks

The Gargoyle Poets Series were a series of Australian poetry chapbooks published by Makar Press from 1972 to 1980 and edited by Martin Duwell. Makar magazine produced four issues a year and from 1972 onward one issue was replaced with three small books from the Gargoyle Poets Series. The series consisted of thirty-seven books of poetry between twenty and thirty-six pages in length.

Makar was established in 1960 as a student run magazine of the English Society of the University of Queensland. Taking its title from the middle-Scots word for maker, it published poetry, fiction, drama and criticism. Graham Rowlands was appointed editor soon after the magazine changed to a smaller format in 1966. Then, in 1968, Martin Duwell was appointed editor, beginning his long association with the magazine. By the early 1970s the poetry published in Makar had evolved, according to Robert Habost in his 1982 assessment for Image, 'from the "gushy", "high flying", imagistic, traditional rhyming verse' of the early 1960s 'to ... stark, concise, condensed verse'.

Makar also conducted a significant series of interviews with contemporary writers, some of which were published in A Possible Contemporary Poetry (1982). In his introduction to this volume, Duwell imagined the Makar audience as 'reasonably intelligent, willing, but puzzled' about the 'profound and acrimonious disagreement about the nature and role of poetry and language'. It was to such debates that Makar addressed itself. The last issue of Makar appeared in September 1980.

Archives for Makar Press, including manuscripts and letters relating to the Gargoyle Poets Series, are available at the Fryer Library, University of Queensland.

== Publications and Reviews ==
- Graham Rowlands Stares and Statues 1972
- Alan Wearne Public Relations 1972
- Richard Packer The Powerhouse 1972
- Peter Annand The Long-Distance Poet’s Entry into Heaven 1973
- Antigone Kefala The Alien 1973
- Rae Desmond Jones Orpheus with a Tuba 1973
- Kris Hemensley Love’s Voyages 1974
- John Griffin A Waltz on Stones 1974
- Stephanie Bennett Madam Blackboots 1974
- Eric Beach St Kilda meets Hugo Ball 1974
- Carol Novack Living Alone without a Dictionary 1974
- John Tranter The Blast Area 1974
- Shelton Lea Chockablock with Dawn 1975
- Philip Neilsen Faces of a Sitting Man 1975
- Jennifer Maiden The Occupying Forces 1975
- John A. Scott The Barbarous Sideshow 1975
- Jennifer Rankin Ritual Shift 1976
- Graham Rowlands Poems Political c.1976
- Andrew Taylor Parabolas: Prose Poems 1976
- Cornelis Vleeskens Hongkong Suicide : and Other Poems 1976
- Lyndon Walker The Green Wheelbarrow 1976
- Peter Annand These Ducks: and Other Poems 1977
- John Jenkins Blindspot 1977
- Rudi Krausmann The Water Lily : and Other Poems 1977
- Philip Hammial Hear Me Eating 1977
- John Edwards Salt 1977
- Graeme Curtis At Last No Reply 1977
- Viv Kitson Life Death and some Words About Them 1978
- Janice M. Bostok On Sparse Brush 1978
- Stephen K. Kelen The Gods Ash their Cigarettes 1978
- Billy Jones Cup Full of River 1978
- Geoff Page Collecting the Weather 1978
- Michael Witts South 1978
- Leon Slade Bloodstock Bleeding 1979
- Peter Anderson Pretending to be Salvador Dali 1979
- Philip Neilson The Art of Lying 1979
- Barry O'Donohue From the Edge of the World 1979
