= Island Press (Australia) =

Australian publisher

Island Press is an Australian publisher of poetry and other interests.

Island Press was founded in 1970 by Canadian poet, musician and Sydney University lecturer Philip Roberts. He lived on Scotland Island at that time, hence the name. In 1973 Philip moved to Bundeena. In the mid-seventies this press was sold to Sydney University where it was used to print diplomas for a few years. In 1979 Philip Roberts returned to Canada and gave Island Press to the "discriminative eye" (Imago, September 1994) of Philip Hammial. Island Press has published more than 50 titles.

Books published include works from Michele Seminara, David Gilbey, Mark Roberts, Lauren Williams, Christine Townend, Jeltje Fanoy, Roberta Lowing, John Watson, Susan Adams, David Musgrave, Barbara De Franceschi, Lizz Murphy, Leith Morton, Philip Hammial, Rae Desmond Jones, Barbara De Francheschi, Les Wicks, David Brooks, Lizz Murphy, Jutta Sieverding, Martin Langford, Leith Morton, Carolyn Gerrish, Rob Reil, Barbara Petrie, Marcelle Freiman, Adam Aitken, J. S. Harry, Anthony Mannix, Denis Gallagher, John Tranter, Kris Hemensley, Andrew Taylor, Philip Roberts, Ken Bolton, Michael Witts, Keith Shadwick, Andrew Huntley, Robert Adamson, Martin Johnston and Kevin Gilbert.
