= Selected Poems (J. S. Harry collection) =

1995 Australian poetry collection by J. S. Harry

- Author: J. S. Harry
- Language: English
- Genre: Poetry collection
- Publisher: Penguin
- Publication date: 1995
- Publication place: Australia
- Media type: Print
- Pages: 261 pp
- Awards: 1996 New South Wales Premier's Literary Award for Poetry, co-winner
- ISBN: 0140587551

Selected Poems is a collection of poems by Australian poet J. S. Harry, published by Penguin Books in 1996.

The collection contains 139 poems from the poet's first three collections, with some new poems and some previously uncollected poems.

It was the co-winner of the 1996 New South Wales Premier's Literary Award for Poetry.

== Contents ==
- "Brindabella : A Shot from the Seventies"
- "Gesture as Postcard (Forbes, Circa 1970)"
- "Griffith 1977"
- "Hand-Me-Downs"
- "Part Seen and Fast Disappearing"
- "Innovation"
- "Old Cretan Myth"
- "The Imaginary She"
- "Sex, B Grade Movies, (Invisible) Censors : 1 : Made in France"
- "Sex, B Grade Movies, (Invisible) Censors : 2 : Made in Australia"
- "Mousepoem"
- "Behind the Slice"
- "A Page for a Lorikeet"
- "A Peter Henry Lepus Poem : National Shrines (Nobody Wins at a Ritual?)"
- "The Painting in the Past"
- "Boat for a Voyage"
- "The What O'Clock"
- "How Old Pity Left the Poem"
- "Ask, Respond!"
- "Into the Landscape"
- "'Dead. Died. Will Die.' - Oh No -"
- "The Little Grenade"
- "Words and Mouthings the Personal Assertion"
- "One, in the Motel"
- "Parts Towards a Meaning 1"
- "Parts Towards a Meaning 2"
- "Parts Towards a Meaning 3"
- "Parts Towards a Meaning 4"
- "Parts Towards a Meaning 5"
- "Between People"
- "Coming and Going: Peripatetic Poet"
- "To a Writer of Epitaph-Epigrams"
- "Snow White"
- "Almost Classical - Autumn/ Winter/ Winter/ Spring"
- "Waiting for the Express, to Go North to Osaka"
- "To Shiki Who Died of Consumption"
- "It Looks Nice and Quiet Down There"
- "Eastern Wood-Carving"
- "The Twentieth Century Playing a Kind of Barmecide with its Poets"
- "Yellow Without Poetry"
- "Unpeeling: A Paddling Song"
- "Somewhere Tropical - a Small Asian State"
- "The Retreat"
- "Honesty-Stones"
- "June 6, 1968 - with R.F.K."
- "Guinea Pigs"
- "He: His Nut's Da and Day -"
- "Watching a Blind Whittler Under a Redwood : Born 82 Years Before Christ and Thinking about a Tree in Disney-Land"
- "The Gift"
- "Showing Ourselves to the Neighbours' Children, Warragamba"
- "After the Money for the Milk"
- "[Untitled] (from The Catcher)"
- "View from a Verandah"
- "Celia"
- "Hurry! Hurry!"
- "Letting Things Work Variously Towards Definition"
- "Log of the Body of a Planet"
- "A Balancing Man"
- "Routine of Durable Fowls Would Drive Him Mad He Says"
- "The Non-Naturalistic Weapon"
- "Trente Ans Apres"
- "One of the Forms..."
- "They Will Think of This Place as Waiting : One and Two"
- "The Sand"
- "Hold, for a Little While, and Turn Gently"
- "Already Someway Off"
- "What Might Pass a Man as a Survivor"
- "Still Park (First Frost, Crisp, Dogless Hour)"
- "In a Goose-Month"
- "Under the Rim"
- "This Cool"
- "The Moon and the Earth-Man"
- "Tell Me What You See Vanishing"
- "On the Existential (1971)"
- "Twenty Years - Fragment -"
- "Shire Poem"
- "Their Common"
- "The Hill"
- "Sentences Without Subjects"
- "A Blue -"
- "Eyes"
- "Prisoning"
- "Whisky on Water"
- "In the Not Quite Human Time/Brother Peter's Bell"
- "Afterwards"
- "The Baby, with the Bath-Water, Thrown Out"
- "Ritual for Anybody"
- "What if the Big Blue Day"
- "A Quality of Loss"
- "Backward Over Dark Water"
- "They Say"
- "Outposts"
- "Selling Ethiopia"
- "The Glorious I or a Deviation from Relations"
- "(Dear Berrigan...)"
- "The Poem Films Itself"
- "Delusion's Bread"
- "The Rain Moves In"
- "Between the Sand Dunes and the Cattle"
- "Parts of Speech as Parts of a Country : I as Desert"
- "Temple-Viewing"
- "Hunting Dragons with Fire Tongues and Deep Smoking Throats"
- "Walking, When the Lake of the Air is Blue with Spring"
- "The Eye Children"
- "Jacana"
- "Frame"
- "Standing in Front of a Woman Artist's Portrait of a Pelican"
- "Xmas Day Outside the Cult of It"
- "This Explains..."
- "Hesse Meets Jung Some Miles from Gundagai"
- "The Gulf of Bothnia"
- "Perisher Valley"
- "Winter '78 : The Material..."
- "Losing a Lover / Discovering a Place to Keep Seagoats"
- "Parts of Speech as Parts of a Country : 2 : He/He Tried"
- "A Shot of War"
- "Working in the Cliches of the 'Apple'"
- "Tunnel Vision"
- "Labour Day Weekend"
- "Collectively, Yr Poems..."
- "Report, from the Outlands, Mating Habits there Being in a State of Flux"
- "The Wanderer"
- "Wind Painting"
- "The Hunting 'Woods'"
- "If... and the Movable Ground"
- "Incident: Language, Her Form as City"
- "'His', but Ultimately Theirs"
- "Deathly Floater"
- "The Problem of His Head"
- "Time Out of Mind"
- "Socio-Realist Fiction / Moves Amongst the Facts / or The Fiction Versus the Facts"
- "To Shed the Face of Henry Lawson"
- "Time in a Pelican's Wing"
- "Mrs Mothers' Day"
- "Ultimately"
- "Sleepers in a Park, Centennial..."
- "Talking of Water"
- "Sleeping in Forest... Swimming in Air..."

== Critical reception ==
Reviewing the collection for Southerly magazine poet and critic Martin Duwell noted that "the poetry is never less than interesting." The review concluded that the "rereading of Harry is to see her as a poet of mesmerising and disorienting variety, once one locates what the variable units are. This might be the reason for the difficulty readers have in reading her work at length: the experience of one poem is not designed to make the next poem more familiar,and an important component of Harry's poetry—generating engine must be the aim to demonstrate that each poem can constitute its elements differently."

== See also ==
- 1995 in Australian literature
