= Judith Wright (disambiguation) =

Judith or Judy Wright may refer to:

- Judith Wright (1915–2000), Australian poet, environmentalist and campaigner for Aboriginal land rights.
- Judith Wright (artist) (born 1945), Australian painter, videomaker, sculptor, printmaker
- Judy Wright (born 1956), Canadian former swimmer

== See also ==
- Judith Wright Award (disambiguation)
