= Blood and Bone (disambiguation) =

Blood and Bone is a 2009 American martial arts film.

Blood and Bone may also refer to:

- Blood and Bone (novel), 2012 novel by Ian Cameron Esselmont
- Blood and Bone (Hodgins collection), 1986 collection of poems by Philip Hodgins
- "Blood and Bone" (The Boys episode), 2026 episode and series finale of the television series The Boys

== See also ==
- Children of Blood and Bone
