= Gwen Harwood Poetry Prize =

Australian poetry prize

The Gwen Harwood Poetry Prize (also known as the Gwen Harwood Memorial Poetry Prize) was created in 1996 in memory of the Tasmanian poet, Gwen Harwood. The prize is run by Island Magazine and is awarded to a single poem or a linked suite of poems. It has a first prize of A$2,000, and the judges may award two minor prizes.

== Winners ==
- 2025: Georgina Woods for Augury: Sea surface temperature charts
- 2024: Yasmin Smith for The Burial Feathers
- 2023: Brigid Coleridge for Day 210
- 2021/2022: Stuart Barnes for Sestina after B. Carlisle
- 2020/2021: Amy Crutchfield for The Memory of Water
- 2018: Damen O'Brien for On the Day You Launch
- 2017: Meredith Wattison for The Munchian O
- 2016: Kate Wellington for Correspondence and Stuart Cooke for In Memory
- 2015: Dan Disney
- 2014: Tim Thorne for Fukushima Suite and Alex Skovron for For Length of Days
- 2013: Chloe Wilson for Blackbirds en Masse and Jan Sullivan for Tour de France
- 2012: Fiona Hile for Bush Poem With Subtitles David Bunn for In Dreams Let Us Not Use First Names
- 2011: Sarah Rice for Against The Grain
- 2010: Maureen O'Shaughnessy for Thursday, July 15
- 2009: Michael Robinson for A Letter on Youth Homelessness
- 2008: Angela Malone for Drawing in the Birth Room
- 2007: Sandy Fitts for Waiting for Goya
- 2006: Elizabeth Campbell for Structure of the Horse's Eye
- 2005: Mark Tredinnick
- 2004: Lesley Walter for Hyphenated Lives
- 2003: Kathryn Lomer
- 2002: Held over to be part of Tasmania Pacific Region Prize awards day
- 2000: Jan Owen
- 1998: Doris Brett
- 1997: M. T. C. Cronin for The Confetti Stone
- 1996: Anthony Lawrence for The Grim Periphery
