= Mousepoem =

1993 poem by Australian poet J. S. Harry

- by J. S. Harry
- Written: 1993
- First published in: Meanjin vol. 52 no. 3, Spring 1993
- Country: Australia
- Language: English
- Lines: 38

"Mousepoem" (1993) is a poem by Australian writer J. S. Harry. It was originally published in Meanjin magazine in Spring 1993, and later included in collections of the author's poetry and a number of Australian poetry anthologies.

== Critical reception ==
In his commentary on the poem in 60 Classic Australian Poems Geoff Page called it a "fine, if not definitive example of free verse and free association." He concluded that the poem "is a fine example of how delicately and obliquely a poem may register human emotions."

In a review of the poet's posthumous collection New and Selected Poems, critic Martin Duwell noted that in this work "the excursion into the slightly twee world of the mouse is structured as a distraction from the mental anguish which is the real subject of the poem."

== Publishing history ==
After its initial publication in Meanjin in 1993 the poem was reprinted as follows:

- A Parachute of Blue edited by Judith Beveridge, Jill Jones, and Louise Wakeling, Round Table Publications, 1995
- Selected Poems by J. S. Harry, Penguin, 1995
- Family Ties : Australian Poems of the Family edited by Jennifer Strauss, Oxford University Press, 1998
- Australian Verse : An Oxford Anthology edited by John Leonard, Oxford University Press, 1998
- 60 Classic Australian Poems edited by Geoff Page, University of NSW Press, 2009
- Contemporary Australian Poetry edited by Martin Langford, Judith Beveridge, Judy Johnson, and David Musgrave, Puncher and Wattmann, 2016
- New and Selected Poems by J. S. Harry, edited by Nicolette Stasko, Giramondo Publishing, 2021

== Notes ==
- You can access the poem through the Open Library's edition of Australian Verse : An Oxford Anthology edited by John Leonard

== See also ==
- 1993 in Australian literature
- 1993 in poetry
