= Coming Home From the World =

1994 Australian poetry collection by Peter Boyle

- Author: Peter Boyle
- Language: English
- Genre: Poetry collection
- Publisher: Five Islands Press
- Publication date: 1994
- Publication place: Australia
- Media type: Print
- Pages: 32 pp
- Awards: 1995 NSW Premier's Prize for Poetry, winner
- ISBN: 1875604243

Coming Home From the World is a collection of poems by Australian poet Peter Boyle, published by Five Islands Press in 1994.

The collection contains 17 poems from a variety of the author's other poetry collections.

It was the winner of the 1995 NSW Premier's Prize for Poetry.

== Contents ==
- "From Instructions Given to the Royal Examiners in the State of Chi"
- "Never Again"
- "On Reading Nadezhda Mandelstam's Memoirs"
- "For a Beautiful Polish Lady"
- "Separation"
- "Woman in a Dark Overcoat Hunched in a Seat"
- "Midwinter Swimming"
- "Moving House"
- "Four Variations on a Text of St John"
- "A Domestic Helper Returns for Christmas in the Province"
- "The Death of Franco"
- "When Eagles Pause to Talk with Your Sleeping Body"
- "Ode to Allen Ginsberg"
- "Robert Frost at Eighty"
- "The Emperor Montezuma Returns to Witness the Enactment of His Last Days in an Opera Composed by Antonio Vivaldi and Performed in the Theatre of St Angelo, Venice, 1733"
- "1892"
- "The Joys of Mathematics"

== See also ==
- 1994 in Australian literature
