= Philip Hodgins =

Australian poet

- Born: Philip Ian Hodgins; 28 January 1959; Shepparton, Victoria, Australia
- Died: 18 August 1995 (aged 36); Maryborough, Victoria, Australia
- Occupation: Poet
- Writing career
- Notable awards: 1987 NSW Premier's Literary Award – Kenneth Slessor Prize for Poetry, winner

Philip Ian Hodgins (28 January 1959 – 18 August 1995) was an Australian poet, whose work appeared in such major publications as The New Yorker.

The Philip Hodgins Memorial Medal for Literary Excellence is awarded annually at the Mildura Writers' Festival, which he co-founded.

== Life ==
Philip Hodgins was born in Shepparton, Victoria, in 1959 and spent his childhood on his parents' dairy farm at nearby Katandra West. He went to school in Geelong and later moved to Melbourne where he worked for several years with a publishing house, before moving to Maryborough in central Victoria.

Hodgins's experience of farm life is strongly present through much of his poetry. His verse novella Dispossessed describes the last weeks of a poor rural family about to be evicted from their farm. Hodgins also wrote about Australian Rules football.

In November 1983 Hodgins was admitted to hospital and diagnosed as having chronic myeloid leukaemia, a cancer of the blood and bone marrow. His experiences as a leukaemia patient form the subject of much of his later work.

In 1990, Hodgins married the writer Janet Shaw, with whom he had two children, Anna and Helen.

Hodgins was a co-founder of the Mildura Writers' Festival.

== Death and legacy ==
Hodgins died of leukaemia in Maryborough on 18 August 1995. A few weeks before his death, the writer Peter Goldsworthy wrote his obituary and sent it to him for perusal. He received in return a bottle of Hodgins's favourite wine, and a note saying it was "an obituary to die for".

His papers, writing and correspondence are held in the Australian Defence Force Academy Library in Canberra.

The annual Philip Hodgins Memorial Medal for Literary excellence has been awarded each year since 1997.

A photograph of Philip Hodgins by A. T. Bolton (1926–1996) is in the National Library of Australia online collection.

Peter Rose called him "probably the most loved [Australian] poet of his generation", noting that "his admirers ranged from... Alan Hollinghurst to Ron Barassi and Peter Porter to Les Murray". Clive James ventured that "if he had lived as long as his admired Goethe, he would probably have been Goethe", although it must be said that he was receiving the Philip Hodgins Memorial Medal at the time.

== Awards ==
- 1986 - Wesley Michael Wright Prize for Poetry
- Bicentennial Poetry Book Award
- 1987 - New South Wales Premier's Literary Awards, Kenneth Slessor Prize for Poetry for Blood and Bone
- 1988 - Grace Perry Memorial Award
- 1993 - Grace Leven Prize for Poetry for The End of the Season
- National Book Council Poetry Prize
- Prairie Schooner Readers Choice USA Award
- 1996 - National Book Council Turnbull Fox Phillips Poetry Prize

== Publications ==
- Blood and Bone (1986)
- Down the Lake with Half a Chook (1988)
- Animal Warmth (1990)
- The End of the Season (1993)
- Up on All Fours (1993)
- Dispossessed (1994)
- Things Happen (1995)
- Selected Poems (1997)
