= Les Wicks =

Australian poet, publisher and editor (born 1955)

- Born: 15 June 1955 (age 71); Sydney
- Occupations: Poet, publisher, editor
- Known for: Poetry
- Website: https://meusepress.org/leswicks

Les Wicks (born 15 June 1955) is an Australian poet, publisher and editor. He has published more than fifteen books of poetry.

== Early life and education ==
Wicks grew up in the western suburbs of Sydney. He studied for a Bachelor of Arts in Asian and Australian History at Macquarie University and worked at a variety of unskilled and semi-skilled jobs while living in Sydney and London.

In the late 1970s, he established Meuse Press (with Bill Farrow) which mixed text and graphics. He helped set up the Poets Union of Australia in New South Wales. From the 1980s, he worked as a union industrial advocate for several unions after obtaining qualifications in Industrial Law from the University of Sydney.

== Selected bibliography ==
- The Vanguard Sleeps In (Glandular, 1981)
- Cannibals (Rochford Street Press, 1985)
- Tickle (Island Press, 1993)
- Nitty Gritty (Five Islands, 1997)
- The Ways of Waves (Sidewalk, 2000)
- Appetites of Light (PressPress, 2002)
- Stories of the Feet (Five Islands, 2004)
- The Ambrosiacs (Island Press, 2009)
- Shadows of the Read (Krok, 2011), 2011) English/Ukrainian
- Barking Wings (PressPress, 2012), 2012)
- Sea of Heartbeak (Unexpected Resilience) (Puncher & Wattmann, 2013)
- El Asombrado (On-line ebook) (Rochford Street Press, 2015) English/Spanish
- Getting By Not Fitting In (Island Press, 2016)
- Belief (Flying Islands, 2019)
- Time Taken – New and Selected (Puncher & Wattmann 2022)
- Various authors (2023). Jarquín, Carlos Javier (ed.). Canto planetario: hermandad en la Tierra. Costa Rica: HC Editores. ISBN 979-8850092115.

=== As editor/co-editor or organised ===
- 2024 * Class Meuse Press
- 2022 * Guide to Sydney Crime Meuse Press
- 2018 * "To End All Wars" (Puncher & Wattmann, 2018)
- 2015 *Guide to Sydney Rivers Meuse Press
- 2011 "AU/UA: Contemporary Poetry of Ukraine and Australia" (Krok, 2011) AUUAMeuse Press
- 2010 "from this Broken Hill" Meuse Press
- 2009 *Guide to Sydney Beaches Meuse Press
- 2000–2008 co-organiser Poets on Wheels.
- 2002 Heritage Light including publishing a poem on the surface of a river.
- 1999–date editor of Australian Poetry Collaboration
- 1998–2003 Written in Sand Project Meuse Press.
- 1999–2000 editor of Hobo.
- 1993 to date director of Island Press.
- 1992–1999 Artransit Project Meuse Press.

This was the first truly mass poetry outreach for both Sydney and Newcastle. Exhibited widely in Australia and other countries.

- 1985 Musicians Union Band Guide. 1978.
- 1984–1997 to Senior Industrial Officer Musicians Union & Media Entertainment & Arts Alliance.
- 1990–93 Sec. NSW ALP Communications & Leisure Policy Committee. –
- 1977–1981 Meuse Press Magazine, supplements & anthologies.
- Part of Poets Union of Australia (NSW) original steering committee, Jnt Sec./Treas. (1979–80), Federal Secretary 1983.
