= Susan Hawthorne =

Australian writer and publisher

- Born: 30 November 1951; Wagga Wagga, New South Wales, Australia
- Occupations: Poet and Novelist

Susan Hawthorne (born 30 November 1951) is an Australian writer, poet, political commentator and publisher. Together with Renate Klein, she is co-founder and director of Spinifex Press, a leading independent feminist publisher. In 2015, she and Klein were named winners of the George Robertson Award, which recognises publishers with 30 years or more service to publishing.

== Career ==
Hawthorne has a doctorate in Women's Studies and Political Science from the University of Melbourne, as well as post graduate qualifications in Ancient Greek and Sanskrit and a Bachelor of Arts (Hons) in Philosophy from La Trobe University. She is an adjunct professor in the Writing Program at James Cook University. Hawthorne is the English language co-ordinator of The International Alliance of Independent Publishers (based in Paris).

Hawthorne is also an aerialist and circus performer. She has performed solo and in the Performing Older Women's Circus and the Melbourne's Women's Circus.

== Writing ==
Hawthorne's writing includes poetry, fiction and non-fiction books.

Her poetry collection Cow was shortlisted for the 2012 Kenneth Slessor Poetry Prize in the NSW Premier's Literary Awards and the Audre Lorde Lesbian Poetry Prize (USA). Her poetry collection Earth's Breath was shortlisted for the 2010 Judith Wright Poetry Prize.

Her novel The Falling Woman was selected as one of The Australian's Year's Best Books (1992) and a Top Twenty Title in the Listener Women's Book Festival (NZ).

The Spinifex Quiz Book was a finalist in The Australian Educational Publishing Awards (1993) and Wild Politics: Feminism, Globalisation and Biodiversity was included in Australian Book Review's list of Best Books for 2002.

Hawthorne has been the recipient of two international residencies: in 2013 from the Australia Council for the Arts for six months to write Lupa and Lamb in Rome and in 2009 a four-month residency for Arts Queensland and the Australia Council to Chennai, India to write Cow.

Hawthorne's work has been published in Australia and internationally in anthologies and literary magazines, in the annual Best Australian Poems (three times) and broadcast on Radio National's Poetica.

== Bibliography ==
- Hawthorne, S & Klein, R. Angels of Power, 1991
- Hawthorne, S, The Spinifex Quiz Book, 1993
- Hawthorne, S & Klein R., Australia for Women: Travel & Culture, 1994
- Hawthorne, S & Dunsford, C., Car Maintenance, Explosives and Love, 1997
- Hawthorne, S & Klein R., Cyberfeminism, 1999
- Hawthorne, S., Bird, 1999
- Hawthorne, S, Wild Politics: Feminism, Globalisation and Biodiversity, 2002
- Hawthorne, S & Fook, J., Cat Tales: The Meaning of Cats in Women's Lives, 2004
- Hawthorne, S & Fook, J., Horse Dreams: The meaning of Horses in Women's Lives, 2005
- Hawthorne, S, The Butterfly Effect, 2006
- Hawthorne, S, The Falling Woman, 2006
- Hawthorne, S & Winter, B., September 11, 2001: Feminist Perspectives, 2007
- Hawthorne, S, Cow, 2011
- Hawthorne, S, Valence: Considering War through Poetry and Theory, 2012
- Hawthorne, S, Earth's Breath, 2012
- Hawthorne, S, Limen, 2013
- Hawthorne, S., Bibliodiversity: A Manifesto for Independent Publishing, 2014
- Hawthorne, S., Lupa and Lamb, 2014
- Hawthorne, S., Dark Matters: A Novel, 2017
- Hawthorne, S., Vortex: The Crisis of Patriarchy, 2020
- Klein, R. & Hawthorne, S., (eds.) Not Dead Yet: Feminism, Passion and Women’s Liberation, 2021
