= Judith Wright Award (disambiguation) =

The Judith Wright Award was an annual Australian poetry prize awarded as part of the ACT Poetry Award between 2005 and 2011. Judith Wright Award may also refer to:

- Judith Wright Calanthe Award, an Australian poetry award, part of the Queensland Premier's Literary Awards since 2004
- Judith Wright Poetry Prize for New and Emerging Poets, an Australian poetry award presented by Overland magazine since 2007
