= Aidan Coleman (poet) =

Australian poet and speechwriter

Aidan Coleman (born 1976) is an Australian poet and speechwriter.

== Background ==
Born in Aberystwyth, Wales, Aidan Coleman grew up in Nottingham, England, and emigrated to Australia when he was eight. He studied at the University of Adelaide, and taught secondary English and History for a number of years before becoming a speechwriter.

His poetry collections have been shortlisted for the NSW Premiers' Kenneth Slessor Prize, the Adelaide Festival Awards for Literature and the Western Australian Premier's Book Awards.

== Bibliography ==
=== Poetry (chapbooks) ===
The Main North Road – Vagabond Press, 2002

Sun in Winter – Picaro Press, 2010

=== Poetry (full collections) ===
Avenues & Runways – Brandl & Schlesinger, 2006

Asymmetry – Brandl & Schlesinger, 2012

Mount Sumptuous – Wakefield Press, 2020

=== Anthologies (as editor/coeditor) ===
Catch Fire: Friendly Street Poets 33 – Wakefield Press, 2009

Light and Glorie – Pantaenus Press, 2012

=== Educational Texts (as coauthor) ===
Insight Shakespeare Plays – Insight Publications, 2008–2014

Titles in the series: Romeo and Juliet, Macbeth, A Midsummer Night's Dream, Othello, The Merchant of Venice, King Lear, Julius Caesar, Hamlet
