= Fiona Hile =

Australian poet, short story writer and literary critic

Fiona Hile is an Australian poet, short story writer and literary reviewer.

== Early life and education ==
Hile studied creative writing in the Department of English and Cultural Studies at the University of Melbourne. She graduated in 2001 with an MA for her thesis, The Six O'Clock Swill.

== Awards and recognition ==
Hile's work has been supported by a number of cultural grants, including the Ian Potter Cultural Trust Travelling Grant (2000), the Felix Myer Scholarship for Literature (2001) and an Arts Victoria Literature Development Grant (2004). She also received a VicArts Grant from Creative Victoria in 2016 to produce "a book of poems exploring contemporary philosophical ideas about art, mathematics, nature, metaphysics and abstraction."

Hile's poem "Bush Poem with Subtitles" was joint winner of the 2012 Gwen Harwood Memorial Poetry Prize. Her poem "The Owl of Lascaux" won second prize in the 2012 Overland Judith Wright Poetry Prize. Judge Peter Minter described her work as "Unique, subtle, exuberant and smart, Fiona Hile's poetry is transformative, a sudden arrest in all the imagination can bear."

Hile won the $30,000 Kenneth Slessor Prize for Poetry for Novelties at the 2014 New South Wales Premier's Literary Awards. Following that win, Bonny Cassidy, fellow poet and lecturer in creative writing at RMIT University, described her poems as "some of the country’s most exciting avant-garde art-making".

Her most recent book, Subtraction, won the Helen Anne Bell Poetry Award. It was also shortlisted by the Mascara Literary Review in the poetry section of its Avant-garde Literary Awards in March 2019.

== Publications ==
- The family idiot. Vagabond Press. 2012.
- — (2013). Novelties. Hunter Publishers. ISBN 978-0-9808639-9-4.
- — (May 2016). Subtraction. Hunter Publishers (published 2016). ISBN 978-0-9943528-4-2.

=== As contributor ===
- Hile, Fiona; Moorhouse, Frank; Clemens, Justin; Mews, Peter (2000). Writing by Fiona Hile, Frank Moorhouse, Justin Clemens & Peter Mews. Common Ground Publishing. ISBN 978-1-86335-014-3.
- Her poem "Forget the Stars" was one of 27 selected by Robert Adamson for inclusion in Poetry: May 2016, the second Australian edition of the Chicago-based magazine.
