= Doris Brett =

Australian writer and clinical psychologist

- Born: 1950 (age 75–76); Melbourne, Victoria, Australia
- Education: University of New England; University of Melbourne; Victoria University of Technology
- Occupations: Novelist, poet, nonfiction writer and clinical psychologist

Doris Brett (born 1950) is an Australian writer and clinical psychologist. She has written in a number of genres, including poetry, memoir and nonfiction.

== Early life and education ==
Brett was born in Melbourne in 1950 to Polish Jewish parents. She is the younger sister of writer, Lily Brett. She was educated at Lee Street State School in Carlton where she was inspired by Gerald Murnane who taught her in 4th grade. She took her undergraduate degree at the University of New England, gaining a BA in psychology and English. She completed a MA in psychology at the University of Melbourne (MA) in 1974 and qualified as a clinical psychologist. In 2002 she was awarded a PhD by Victoria University of Technology (now Victoria University) for her thesis, "Eating the Underworld: A memoir in three voices".

== Career ==
Alongside working as a psychologist, Brett conducted bread-making workshops to earn money to fund visits to the United States to develop her skills in hypnosis for her clinical practice. Her first published book was Doris Brett's Australian Bread Book.

Brett's first published poem, "Motel", appeared in The Bulletin in 1980. In 1984 she won the inaugural Mary Gilmore Award for a first book of poetry. Her poems have appeared in literary journals such as Poetry Australia, Island, Luna and Overland and in The Age newspaper as well as in the New Oxford Book of Australian Verse.

Brett worked as a psychotherapist in the oncology unit at The Alfred Hospital for eight years prior to her own diagnosis with ovarian cancer in 1994. Following surgery and treatment she recovered but cancer returned in 1996. She found storytelling through writing poetry and prose was a way of making sense of her life. She also draws on her dreams for inspiration.

Brett practices as a clinical psychologist in Melbourne, where she lives with her husband. She has a daughter, Amantha.

== Awards ==
- The Truth About Unicorns
  - Winner, Anne Elder Award, 1984
  - Winner, Mary Gilmore Award, 1985
- In the Constellation of the Crab
  - Shortlisted, Banjo Award for Poetry, 1997
- "Pages from the Other World Snap Shots from a Journey Through Illness" in Island
  - Winner, Gwen Harwood Poetry Prize, 1998

== Selected works ==
- Doris Brett's Australian bread book (1984) cookery
- The Truth About Unicorns (1984) poetry
- Annie's Stories: A special kind of storytelling (1988) nonfiction
- More Annie Stories (1990 in the US, 1997 in Australia) nonfiction
- Looking for Unicorns (1992) novel
- In the Constellation of the Crab (1996) poetry
- Eating the Underworld (2001) memoir
- The Sunday Story Club (2019) nonfiction co-written by Kerry Cue
