= Not Finding Wittgenstein =

2007 Australian poetry collection by J. S. Harry

- Author: J. S. Harry
- Language: English
- Genre: Poetry collection
- Publisher: Giramondo Publishing
- Publication date: 2007
- Publication place: Australia
- Media type: Print
- Pages: 238 pp
- Awards: 2008 The Age Book of the Year – Poetry Prize, winner
- ISBN: 9781920882204

Not Finding Wittgenstein is a collection of poems by Australian poet J. S. Harry, published by Giramondo Publishing in 2007.

The collection contains 53 poems reprinted from several of the author's previous poetry collections, a number of Australian and USA literary journals and with some being published here for the first time.

It was the winner of the 2008 The Age Book of the Year – Poetry Prize.

== Synopsis ==
This collection is subtitled "Peter Henry Lepus Poems" where the subject "is an Australian rabbit of English extraction and sternly British pragmatism, related to one, Picasso Rabbit, living in the Lake District".

== Contents ==
First Poems

- "Lapin on the Loose : 1 Under Drought"
- "Lapin on the Loose : 2 A Good Rabbit?"
- "'South' Country – in 'Value-Judgment' Land"
- "Antarctica?"
- "Calcutta:"
- "Small and Rural"
- "Ses Arriere-Pensees : A Rueful Survey"
- "Rot from the Head Down?"
- "An Art Historian with a Church for a Burrow"
- "National Shrines (Nobody Wins at a Ritual?)"
- "Circles"
- "Japan"

Sun Shadow, Moon Shadow

- "A Preface?"
- "Peter Meets the American"
- "They"
- "The Hairy Rabbiters"
- "Picasso's Salad"
- "At the Poets' Union Party, June 31st, 1998"
- "Web'd""
- "A Sunlit Morning, Labor Day, Late Twentieth Century"
- "Laws 1"
- "Laws 2"
- "Moonlight Becomes You?"

New Poems

- "In 'the Ukraine'"
- "Ideations?"
- "The Batless Sky"
- "The Aggression..."
- "Relativities"

Peter Henry Lepus in 'Iraq, 2003'

- "Far from the Shatt-al-Arab"
- "On the Outskirts of "War"?"
- "A Sack"
- "Journeys West of 'War' : 1 Wind on Fencing Wire"
- "Journeys West of 'War' : 2. What is 'The World'?"
- "The Camel"
- "Journeys West of 'War' : 3. 'South'?"
- "Max"
- "West of Al Shualla"
- "Return to Baghdad : 1 Regressive - Near the Euphrates - Finding the Dead Iraqi"
- "Return to Baghdad : 2 Closer to the Tigris"
- "Mio Palazzo"
- "Thales of the Pre-Socratics"
- "Two Days After They Arrive in Baghdad"
- "Dilemma?"
- "Archival"
- "A Suspension?"
- "A Big Gold Map"
- "Clifta's Spin"
- "Clifta Tells..."
- "Braid"
- "Getting to Know"
- "This Poem..."
- "Braid's Book"
- "'Zarathustra'?... Only a Draft"

== Critical reception ==
In The Age newspaper Lisa Gorton commented that "Not Finding Wittgenstein holds in play various ways of imagining the world: in language and without language, as philosophy and in fact. This gives even the puns in this collection an effect like candour: they are often strangely moving."

Reviewing the volume for Australian Book Review Peter Porter called it "something of a triumph." He also stated that "When read in toto it becomes a humane and comprehensive gathering of mankind's desire to find connections, to realise meditation's wish to bind up anything and everything by language alone."

== Awards ==
- 2008 The Age Book of the Year – Poetry Prize, winner
- 2008 ALS Gold Medal, shortlisted

== Notes ==
- Dedication: For Sarah, Andrew, Sally, and Bill
- Epigraphs:
  - "And sometimes when people went on the roads they changed their lives." - Bob Hudson, ABC Radio, 19 June 1991
  - "In Principle, philosophy can always go astray, which is the sole reason why it can go forward." - Theodore Adorno, Negative Dialectics
  - "It is more important that a proposition be interesting than it be true." - A.N. Whitehead, Adventures of Ideas
  - "If one does not hope, one will not find the un-hoped for, since there is no trail leading to it, and no path." - Heraclitus

== See also ==
- 2007 in Australian literature
