= Meuse Press =

Meuse Press * is an Australian Press, publishing a range of "poetry outreach" projects in a number of media ranging from a literary magazine to poetry published on the surface of a river. It was founded by Bill Farrow and Les Wicks. It is mostly edited/curated by the poet Les Wicks, but others in editorial roles have included Bill Farrow, Geoff Aldridge, Grant Caldwell, Raj Nair, Christine Peiying Chen, Deidre Kelsall, Carol Chandler, Marvis Sofield, Barbara De Franceschi, Jonathan Cant, Lynn Clayton and Susan Adams.

Initially, it was an occasional magazine and an insert into other publications and anthologies. The first issue was in 1977. Publication of most of Australia's leading poets of the time was accompanied by graphics, and the magazine was a market leader in merging these two art forms.

== History ==
From 1992 to 1999, Meuse published Artransit, which put poetry/art collaborations on Newcastle and Sydney buses and ferries. For the first time for both Sydney and Newcastle there was a truly mass poetry outreach programme. This collection has been exhibited in London, New York, St Louis, Sydney (multiple times), Maroochydore, and Brisbane. Historian Robert Holden has said "They engage a truly democratic audience. They impose themselves into locations usually reserved for advertising and mass consumption. They are immediate in their effect, and in the final analysis contribute to the vitalism of a public space. It was described as "...a singular surprise and delight..." by Robert Holden.

In 2002, in conjunction with Don Gunn produced Heritage Light with Parramatta City Council. This series of banners, soundscapes, and projected poetry sought to reconnect citizens with their city at night whilst simultaneously celebrating heritage Week. A key part was the publishing of a poem on the surface of the Parramatta River so that it appeared to float downstream. This was widely regarded as a world first.

In 1998–2003, Written in Sand was displayed in bus shelters across Waverley with council support. This was a project designed to capture a picture of the area – its people, landscapes, and history – through poetry. In 2009, the launch of the e-anthology "Guide to Sydney Beaches" aimed at an audience new to poetry. In 2010, from this Broken Hill, there was a celebration of the famous outback city. In 2011, "AU/UA Contemporary Poetry of Ukraine & Australia" was produced in cooperation with Krok Press – a first attempt to explore both nations' poetries in both languages. It was edited by Les Wicks, Yury Zavadsky and Grigory Semenchuk.

"Guide to Sydney Rivers" was released in 2015 as a companion volume to the earlier beaches project and is aimed at an audience beyond the usual poetry readership. A third installment "Guide to Sydney Crime" *SydneyCrime.pdf was published in 2022. In 2024 the anthology "Class" was released looking at the issue in a 21st century context.

Since April 2000, Meuse has produced Australian Poetry Collaboration. This online ezine mostly publishes poetry arising from events.
