= Renate Klein =

Australian academic and publisher

Renate Klein (born 5 April 1945) is an Australian academic, writer, publisher, and feminist health activist. Klein was an associate professor in women's studies at Deakin University until her retirement in 2006, and with Susan Hawthorne, she co-founded the independent feminist publishing company, Spinifex Press in 1991. She is herself the author and editor of 14 books, many of which explore reproductive technologies and the medicalisation of women.

== Career ==
Klein is a biologist and social scientist and has taught courses on reproductive medicine and feminist ethics. She was born in Switzerland and was awarded a Master of Science degree in biology from the University of Zurich and later obtained a Bachelor of Arts (honours) degree from the University of California and a Doctor of Philosophy from the University of London. She has conducted research into new and old reproductive technologies including international population control, IVF, hormonal and immunological contraceptives, RU486 and Gardasil and operates several blogs on these topics.

Described as a radical feminist and supporter of women's right to access abortion, she was strongly critical of the Therapeutic Goods Act (TGA) approval process in relation to the abortion drug RU486 which she regards as dangerous. She has also spoken out strongly against commercial surrogacy and the dangers of the contraceptive Depo Provera and the Gardasil vaccine.

== Published works ==
- A Girl's Best Friend: the meaning of dogs in women's lives, Jan Fook and Renate Klein (eds.), Spinifex Press, 2001
- Angels of Power and other reproductive creations, Susan Hawthorne, Renate Klein (eds.), Spinifex Press, 1991
- Australia For Women: Travel and Culture, Renate Klein, Susan Hawthorne (eds.), Spinifex Press, 1994
- Cat Tales: the meaning of cats in women's lives, Jan Fook, Susan Hawthorne (eds.), Spinifex Press, 2003
- Cyberfeminism: Connectivity, Critique and Creativity, Susan Hawthorne, Renate Klein (eds.), Spinifex Press, 1999, 2003
- The Exploitation of a Desire: Women's experiences with in vitro fertilisation: an exploratory survey, Women's Studies Summer Institute, 1989
- Horse Dreams: the meaning of horses in women's lives, Jan Fook, Susan Hawthorne, Renate Klein (eds.), Spinifex Press, 2004
- Radically Speaking: Feminism Reclaimed, Diane Bell, Renate Klein (eds.), Spinifex Press, 1996
- RU 486: Misconceptions, Myths and Morals, Renate Klein, Janice G Raymond, Lynette J Dumble, Spinifex Press, 1991, 2013
- Surrogacy: A Human Rights Violation, Renate Klein, Spinifex Press, 2017
- Not Dead Yet: Feminism, Passion and Women’s Liberation, Renate Klein, Susan Hawthorne (eds.), 2021

== Awards ==
- Angels of Power: 1991, Australian Feminist Book Fortnight Favourite
- RU 486: Australian Human Rights Award for Literature and Other Writing, Certificate of Commendation for Non-fiction, 1992
- George Robertson Award 2015, with Susan Hawthorne, for 30+ years' experience as publishers
