= Race Against Time (poetry collection) =

1998 poetry collection by Lee Cataldi

- Author: Lee Cataldi
- Language: English
- Genre: Poetry collection
- Publisher: Penguin
- Publication date: 1998
- Publication place: Australia
- Media type: Print
- Pages: 89 pp.
- Awards: 1999 NSW Premier's Prize for Poetry, winner
- ISBN: 0140588914

Race Against Time is a collection of poems by Australian poet Lee Cataldi, published by Penguin in 1998.

The collection contains 73 poems with several previously published in Australian literary magazines such as Meanjin, and most published here for the first time.

The collection won the 1999 NSW Premier's Prize for Poetry.

== Contents ==
- "Lake Gregory and Liberation Theology"
- "Meditation on Lake Gregory"
- "Inspiration"
- "Outdoor Mass in Balgo"
- "Hope"
- "Love"
- "Curtain Fall"
- "Race Against Time"
- "Faith"
- "New Year"
- "Players"
- "Computer Games"
- "Rock and Hard Place Blues"
- "The Take It on Board Poem"
- "Green Pieces : The World"
- "Green Pieces : Bald Eagle Prince William Sound"
- "Green Pieces : May Day in Darwin"
- "Green Pieces : The Long Run"
- "Green Pieces : Today"
- "Green Pieces : End"
- "Afternoon at Prince Henry (for Bill Foster)"
- "Peter Wilenski 1939-1994"
- "The Simple Past"
- "Life Goes On"
- "Tortoises and Other Pets"
- "Just for the Record"
- "Saw This Last Night"
- "Research Ethics"
- "Putting on Lipstick"
- "Cyclist at Noon"
- "Flight from Alice Springs"
- "Beam Me to Kintore Japanangka"
- "Scenes from Life in the North : Returning from College: Katherine Airport"
- "Scenes from Life in the North : 'On Fishtrap' Painted by Les Midikuria"
- "Scenes from Life in the North : Wet Season"
- "Scenes from Life in the North : Dance"
- "Scenes from Life in the North : Settlement Politics"
- "Scenes from Life in the North : The Almanacs of Daylight"
- "Scenes from Life in the North : Exogamy"
- "Scenes from Life in the North : Coming Back from America"
- "The Missionary's Prayer"
- "Tropical Fish Tank"
- "BM 150"
- "BM 140"
- "BM 130"
- "Moola Bulla"
- "On the Events of the Afternoon of Saturday 9th December 1995"
- "Night Landing"
- "Sugar Bag"
- "Summer"
- "Letter from Halls Creek"
- "Journey : Point of Departure"
- "Journey : The Plane Lands in Darwin"
- "Journey : What Lies Ahead"
- "Journey : Now"
- "Journey : Mountain"
- "Aldinga : 1"
- "Aldinga : 2"
- "Aldinga : 3"
- "Aldinga : 4"
- "Aldinga : 5"
- "Aldinga : 6"
- "Aldinga : 7"
- "Aldinga : 8"
- "Aldinga : 9"
- "Downhill"
- "A Family Affair"
- "Mosman"
- "Fall Line"
- "Going"
- "The Fat of the Dead"
- "Heaven (for Daniel)"
- "Se Vuoi Sopravivere La Tua Propria Morte (for Paul Sonnino)"

== Critical reception ==
In a review of the collection for Hecate's Australian Women's Book Review Bev Braune found it "is underscored by a disarming voice and the kind of love we associate with a mediator: sympathetic understanding and yearning to save others if only in order to discover how to save oneself." The review went on to conclude that "we discover a poet who puts to work her discipline in documenting what lies below the surface of things. She is inspired by landscapes of people and places, an acute vision, an attention to taking direction."

== See also ==
- 1998 in Australian literature
