= Adrian Caesar =

Australian author and poet

- Born: 1955 (age 70–71); Manchester, United Kingdom
- Education: B.A. Hons, PhD
- Alma mater: Reading University
- Occupations: Lecturer, writer and poet
- Writing career
- Language: English
- Notable work: The White (1999)
- Notable awards: Nettie Palmer Prize, 2000; A.C.T. Book of the Year, 2000

Adrian Caesar (born 1955) is an Australian author and poet.

Caesar was born in Manchester, United Kingdom and emigrated to Australia in 1982. He studied at Reading University and has held appointments at various Australian universities, including the Australian National University and the University of New South Wales' School of Humanities and Social Sciences.

== Writing ==
Caesar is the author of several books, including the prize-winning non-fiction novel The White based on the Antarctic exploration of Robert F. Scott and Douglas Mawson from 1911 to 1913. His later novel, The Blessing was long-listed for the Voss Literary Prize in 2016. His poems have been widely published and his 2005 poetry collection High Wire was shortlisted for the 2007 Judith Wright Prize.

=== Bibliography ===
==== Novels ====
- The White: Last Days in the Antarctic Journeys of Scott and Mawson 1911-1913 (1999)
- The Blessing (2015)

==== Collected poetry ====
- Hunger Games (1996)
- Life Sentences (1998)
- The June Fireworks: New and Selected Poems (2001)
- High Wire (2005)
- Dark Cupboards New Rooms (2014)

==== Non Fiction ====
- Dividing Lines: Poetry, Class and ideology in the 1930s (1991)
- Taking it Like a Man: Suffering, Sexuality and the War Poets (1993)
- Kenneth Slessor (1995)

== Awards ==
The White: Last Days in the Antarctic Journeys of Scott and Mawson 1911–1913

- 2000 Nettie Palmer Prize for Non-fiction
- 2000 ACT Book of the Year
