= Libby Hart =

Australian poet

Libby Hart (born 1971 in Melbourne) is a poet from Victoria, Australia. She was awarded the 2003 D. J. O'Hearn Memorial Fellowship and its artist-in-residence appointment from the Australian Centre at the University of Melbourne.

Her suite of poems, "Fresh News from the Arctic" won the Somerset National Poetry Prize in 2005. Her first collection of poetry, also called "Fresh News from the Arctic," was published in 2006 by Interactive Press and received the Anne Elder Award as part of the 2006 FAW National Literary Awards. Her collection "Wild" was shortlisted for the Kenneth Slessor Prize for Poetry, New South Wales Premier's Awards in 2015, while Burn was shortlisted for the same prize in 2024.

Hart's writings and poetry have appeared widely in literary magazines, electronic publications and newspapers in Australia and elsewhere, including Eureka Street and Meanjin. Hart's work has featured on the (Australian) Radio National's PoeticA programme.
