= Tim Thorne =

Australian poet, editor, and academic (1944–2021)

Timothy Colin Thorne (25 March 1944 – 16 September 2021) was an Australian contemporary poet.

== Early life ==
Timothy Colin Thorne was born on 25 March 1944 in Launceston, Tasmania.

== Career ==
Thorne wrote 15 volumes of poetry, his last, Running Out of Entropy (2018, Walleah Press).

In 1985, he inaugurated the Tasmanian Poetry Festival, which he directed until 2001 and which incorporates his invention, the Launceston Poetry Cup, a performance poetry concept now imitated all over Australia and internationally.

Thorne had been writer-in-residence with a number of organisations, including the Miscellaneous Workers Union and the Queen Victoria Museum and Art Gallery, and had worked as a poet in schools, universities and prisons.

== Activism ==
Thorne had an abiding interest in creating opportunities for poets and other artists with disabilities and from 1998 to 2000 he was National Secretary of DADAA (Disability and the Arts, Disadvantage and the Arts Australia). In 1999–2000, he was writer/co-ordinator for a national project for writers with cerebral palsy, conducted through Arts 'R' Access. In 2002, he was editor of the Launceston Longpoem, a web-based community writing project funded through Tasmanian Regional Arts.

He was also active in campaigns for peace and environmental values. He was instrumental in establishing the Vietnam Moratorium protests in Launceston in 1969, the Northern Tasmanian Unemployed Workers' Union in 1978, Now We the People (Tasmania) in 2000 and the Campaign for a Clean Tamar Valley in 2006.

In 2014 he was elected President of TAP into a Better Tasmania (formerly Tasmanians Against a Pulp Mill) and National President of SEARCH (Social Education, Action and Research Concerning Humanity) Foundation.

== Personal life ==
Thorne lived in Launceston most of his life, apart from short periods in Sydney, New South Wales, and Palo Alto, California.

He married Stephanie Lyne in 1969 and they had two daughters and two granddaughters.

He died on 16 September 2021, aged 77.

== Awards ==
Thorne was awarded a number of prizes, including Stanford Writing Scholarship, 1971; New Poetry Award, 1973; Marten Bequest Travelling Scholarship for poetry, 1978, and the Gleebooks Poetry Sprint, 1995. He won the Launceston Poetry Cup in 2006 and 2008 and was a finalist in the Australian National Poetry Slam in 2009 and 2010.

He was awarded the William Baylebridge Memorial Award for A Letter to Egon Kisch in 2007, the Christopher Brennan Award in 2013 and the Gwen Harwood Poetry Prize in 2014.

He also received grants and fellowships from the Australia Council, Arts Tasmania and the Eleanor Dark Foundation.

== Bibliography ==
=== 15 poetry collections ===
- —— (1969). Tense Mood and Voice. Lyre-Bird Writers.
- —— (1971). The What of Sane. Prism Books. ISBN 9780858690004.
- —— (1976). New Foundations. Poetry Society of Australia. ISBN 0858690098.
- —— (1979). A Nickel in My Mouth. Robin Hill Books. ISBN 0908030037.
- —— (1982). The Atlas. Black Lightning Press. ISBN 094958200X.
- —— (1990). Red Dirt. Paper Bark Press. ISBN 0958780153.
- —— (1995). The Streets Aren't for Dreamers. Shoestring Press. ISBN 1899549021.
- —— (1997). Taking Queen Victoria to Inveresk. QVM&AG. ISBN 0724648003.
- —— (2004). Head and Shin. Walleah Press. ISBN 1877010030.
- —— (2006). Best Bitter. PressPress. ISBN 0958036780.
- —— (2007). A Letter to Egon Kisch. Cornford Press. ISBN 9780646471549.
- —— (2008). I Con. Salt Publishing. ISBN 9781844713370.
- —— (2012). Yeah No. PressPress. ISBN 9780987305701.
- —— (2014). The Unspeak Poems and Other Verses. Walleah Press. ISBN 9781877010439.
- —— (2018). Running Out of Entropy. Walleah Press. ISBN 9781877010804.
