= Lee Cataldi =

Australian poet and linguist

- Born: Lee A. Sonnino; 1942 (age 83–84); Sydney, Australia
- Occupations: Poet, linguist
- Spouse: Gianni Cataldi

Lee Cataldi (born 1942) is a contemporary Australian poet and linguist.

== Life, education and work ==
Cataldi (née Sonnino) was born in Sydney during World War II. Due to her father’s Italian heritage, she was briefly interned. As a child she lived in Mosman and Hobart.

As an adult, she moved back to Sydney to study a Bachelor of Arts at the University of Sydney. She graduated with Honours in 1962 and won the University Medal. In May 1964, Cataldi moved to Oxford to study Renaissance Literature, later receiving a Bachelor of Letters from Oxford University in 1968. While in the UK, she met and married her now-husband, Italian Gianni Cataldi, and lived in Italy for a year.

In the late sixties she travelled to Italy and England where she became a socialist, inspired by the May 1968 uprising in France.

After returning to Australia in the 1970s, Cataldi gained a Diploma in Education. Since then, she has worked as a teacher. She has also worked as a linguist on Indigenous Australian languages in Halls Creek, Alice Springs and Balgo.

Cataldi's first book of poems, Invitation to a Marxist lesbian party, was published in 1978, winning the Anne Elder Memorial Prize in that year. Women who live on the ground (1990) received the Human Rights and Equal Opportunity Commission Poetry Award; it was also short-listed for the New South Wales Premier's Literary Awards. Race against time (1998) won the 1999 Kenneth Slessor Prize for Poetry.

In 1998 Cataldi travelled to Madras, India, for an Asialink Literature Residency.

== Published works ==
=== Poetry ===
- Invitation to a Marxist lesbian party, Wild & Woolley, 1978
- Women who live on the ground: Poems, 1978-1988, Penguin Australia, 1990
- Race Against Time: Poems, Penguin Australia, 1998
- Mourning is Women's Business, Puncher & Wattmann, 2023

=== Non-fiction ===
- A Handbook to Sixteenth Century Rhetoric, Routledge, 1967. ISBN 9781032458946
- Warlpiri Dreamings and Histories: Newly Recorded Stories from the Aboriginal Elders of Central Australia. Coll. and trans. with Peggy Rockman Napaljarri, Schwartz, 2003. ISBN 0-7619-8992-7

== Work history ==
- 1967-1973: Lecturer of English at the University of Bristol.
- 1975-1981: Teacher at Tempe High School and several other Sydney schools.
- 1981-1982: Coordinator of the Poets in Schools Project in Sydney, for the Australia Council.
- 1983-1991: Teacher/linguist at Lajamanu School in Northern Territory.
- 1991-1994: Co-collected and co-translated Warlpiri traditional narratives with Peggy Rockman Napaljarri, collating them into the text Walpiri Dreamings and Histories (1994).
- 1993: Joint consultant with Christine Nicholls of Flinders University, in delivering the 3rd stage of the AIDAB project 'Vernacular Publishing, Creating a Literature' for the Education Departments of the Republic of Kiribati and the Cook Islands.
- 1998:
  - Visiting Scholar at the Centre for Women's Studies at the University of Adelaide
  - ASIALINK Writer's Residency in Delhi, India
