= Caroline Caddy =

Australian poet

- Born: 20 January 1944 (age 82); Western Australia

Caroline Mavis Caddy (born 20 January 1944) is an Australian poet.

== Biography ==
Born in Western Australia to an Australian mother and an American father, Caroline Mavis Caddy spent part of her childhood in the United States and Japan. She returned to Western Australia where she finished high school, and later worked as a dental nurse with the Road Dental Unit. According to Queensland poet Jaya Savige "Caddy writes with equal verve about the rural southwest of WA and her time abroad, particularly in China (though also Canada and Antarctica). ...Her relaxed, often conversational tone belies her sharp eye for detail which, combined with a knack for simile and metaphor, has remained acute throughout her career."

== Awards ==
- 1990 – Western Australian Week Literary Award for poetry
- 1992 – National Book Council Banjo Award for Poetry
- 2008 – Wesley Michel Wright Prize

== Bibliography ==
- Singing at Night (1980)
- Letters From the North (1985)
- Beach Plastic (1989)
- Conquistadors (1991)
- Antarctica (1996)
- Working Temple (1996)
- Editing the Moon (1999)
- Esperance: New and Selected Poems (2007)
- Burning Bright (2010)
