= Rose Zwi =

South African-Australian writer and anti-apartheid activist

Rose Zwi (8 May 1928 – 22 October 2018) was a Mexican-born South African–Australian writer and anti-apartheid activist best known for her work about the immigrants in South Africa.

== Biography ==
Zwi was born in Oaxaca, Mexico, to Jewish refugees from Lithuania who arrived in 1926 from Žagarė, and her family moved to South Africa when she was a young girl. In 1967 Zwi graduated from the University of Witwatersrand (Johannesburg) with a BA (Hons) in English literature. While living in South Africa, she was part of the white anti-apartheid organization Black Sash.

Zwi lived briefly in Israel, but returned to South Africa until 1988 when she relocated to Australia. She became an Australian citizen in 1992 and lived in Sydney, New South Wales. She visited her parents' hometown, Žagarė, in 2006.

She died in 2018 in Sydney, at the age of 90.

== Another Year in Africa ==
Another Year in Africa is set in a fictional town of Mayfontein, near Johannesburg in the late 1930s and early 1940s. The novel is a chronicle of exile, alienation and assimilation centering the Jewish community of Lithuanian descent.

== Awards ==
- 1982 – Winner of the Olive Schreiner Prize for Another Year in Africa – a prize for new and emerging writers
- 1982 – Mofolo-Plomer Prize for an unpublished novel (The Umbrella Tree)
- 1994 – Human Rights and Equal Opportunity Commission Fiction Award for Safe Houses

== Works ==
Year	Title	Imprint	ISBN
1980	Another Year in Africa	Ravan Press	ISBN 0869753169
1981	The Inverted Pyramid : a Novel	Ravan Press	ISBN 086975212X
1984	Exiles: A Novel	Donker	ISBN 0868520608
1990	The Umbrella Tree	Penguin	ISBN 0140134107
1993	Safe Houses	Spinifex	ISBN 1875559213
1997	Last Walk in Naryshkin Park	Spinifex	ISBN 1875559728
2002	Speak the Truth, Laughing	Spinifex	ISBN 1876756217
2010	Once Were Slaves: A Journey Through the Circles of Hell	Sydney Jewish Museum	ISBN 9780980545869

== Bibliography ==
- Claudia Bathsheba Braude, Contemporary Jewish Writing in South Africa: An Anthology, University of Nebraska, 2001
- Elizabeth le Roux, Publishing against Apartheid South Africa, A Case Study of Ravan Press, Cambridge University Press, 2020
