= How to Emerge =

2025 poetry collection by Jill Jones

- Author: Jill Jones
- Language: English
- Genre: Poetry collection
- Publisher: Vagabond Press
- Publication date: September 2025
- Publication place: Australia
- Media type: Print
- Pages: 96 pp.
- Awards: 2026 NSW Premier's Prize for Poetry, winner
- ISBN: 0140588914

How to Emerge is a collection of poems by Australian poet Jill Jones, published by Vagabond Press in 2025.

The collection contains 65 poems from a number of literary publications in Australia and elsewhere, with some published here for the first time.

The collection won the 2026 NSW Premier's Prize for Poetry.

== Contents ==
- "Where Rain Meets Music"
- "How to Emerge: Phases"
- "Bridges"
- "The Undone Blouse"
- "Losing My Clothes"
- "Impossible Scar"
- "A Mouthful of Cold Days"
- "Am I Blue"
- "In a Moment's"
- "A Blue Container"
- "Breach"
- "Through the Cracks"
- "What I Didn't Know Even Whern I Did"
- "If It Rains"
- "Fits of Authenticity"
- "Drafts for an Ephemeral Voiceover"
- "Where Rock Meets Air"
- "Testament"
- "In the Archive of Air"
- "Disintegration Loop"
- "Plagues"
- "How to Emerge: Disquiet"
- "Again Then Again"
- "Empty Plates"
- "Attachments in the Very Ordinary: 14 Positions in a Day"
- "Intensities"
- "Goodbye Old Infestations"
- "Better Time"
- "Sometimes, almost more"
- "The Crow"
- "To Live By Seeing"
- "Where Breath Meets Skin"
- "Endless Measures"
- "A Warning at the Table"
- "How to Emerge: Thrown"
- "Constancies"
- "A Plea"
- "Will Suggest Autumn"
- "While Out and About"
- "Somewhere Ago"
- "Getting Up"
- "'Are We Getting Somewhere?'"
- "Eternity"
- "Reaching for the Remote"
- "It Was a Hard Drive"
- "Modes (of Nothing)"
- "As Commodities as Refuse"
- "Still Unknowable"
- "Where Day Meets Its Dream"
- "Sorting"
- "Hello"
- "Advice and Warnings Or What We Learned from the Gods"
- "My Bundle"
- "The Self Re-Run"
- "When We Almost"
- "Poem Mourning My name"
- "Shapes of Light"
- "How to Emerge: Endless"
- "Translations"
- "Succumbs"
- "Twinkly Pianos and Making Up for Lost Time"
- "Lines Chasing Zero"
- "Now is Never Now"
- "Where Earth Meets Times"
- "Release and Release"

== Critical reception ==
Writing about the collection for Australian Book Review Shari Lynelle noted that one "striking thing about Jill Jones's poetry is the slippage that occurs around the 'I' of any speaker, into and through the ephemeral weather of a whole range of selves-in-motion, some of them not even human." They went on to conclude that this volume "showcases the work of a poet in full, late, and enduring maturity."

== Awards ==
- 2026 NSW Premier's Prize for Poetry, winner
- 2026 Prime Minister's Literary Awards — Poetry, shortlisted

== Notes ==
- Author's note: "The poems in this book are composed of lines that are multiples of the number three."
- Dedication: For Annette, always
- Quotes:

"Not knowing when the Dawn will come/I open every Door;/Or has it Feathers like a Bird,/Or Billows like a Shore?" – Emily Dickinson, #1619 'Not knowing when...'

"E quindi uscimmo a revider la stelle/And then we emerged to see again the stars" – Dante, Inferno, Canto XXXIV

== See also ==
- 2025 in Australian literature
