= Joanne Burns =

Australian poet

- Born: 5 December 1945 (age 80); Australian
- Occupation: Australian poet

Joanne Burns (born 5 December 1945) is a contemporary Australian poet and prose writer, with a strong emphasis on performance in her work.

== Biography ==
Joanne Burns grew up and lives in Sydney. She studied at the University of Sydney and has taught English and creative writing at secondary and tertiary levels in Australia and England. Her work hovers between poetry and prose, and often incorporates 'found writing' from newspapers and other everyday sources. In the 1980s she participated in the experimental writing group Sydney Women Writers' Workshop.

She has won or been shortlisted for poetry awards. Further, her work has appeared in several anthologies, including The Penguin Book of Australian Women Poets (1986), The Penguin Book of Modern Australian Poetry (1991), and The Oxford Book of Australian Women’s Verse (1995).

Her poems are studied in high schools and have been produced for radio and theatre.

== Awards and nominations ==
- Footnotes of a hammock, joint winner of the inaugural Judith Wright Award for a collection of poetry in the 2005 ACT Poetry Awards
- an illustrated history of diaries, shortlisted for the Kenneth Slessor Prize for Poetry in the 2008 New South Wales Premier's Literary Awards
- brush, winner of the Kenneth Slessor Prize for Poetry in the 2016 New South Wales Premier's Literary Awards
- apparently, shortlisted for the Kenneth Slessor Prize for Poetry in the 2020 New South Wales Premier's Literary Awards

== Bibliography ==
=== Poetry ===
- Burns, Joanne (1972). Snatch. London: Strange Faeces.
- — (1973). Ratz.
- — (1976). Adrenalin flicknife.
- — (1976). Alphabatics.
- — (1977). Poems for a split second : No. 1. Lean Sisters.
- — (1988). Blowing bubbles in the 7th lane. Sydney: Fab.
- — (1992). On a clear day. ETT Imprint.
- — (1996). Penelope's knees. UQP.
- — (1999). Aerial photography. Five Islands.
- — (2001). People like that: and other poems. Picara Press.
- — (2004). Footnotes of a Hammock. Five Islands.
- — (2007). An Illustrated History of Diaries. Giramondo.
- — (2011). Amphora. Giramondo.
- — (2014). Brush. Giramondo.
- — (2019). Apparently. Giramondo.

=== Critical studies and reviews ===
- Lucas, Rose (September 2011). "Scatter". Australian Book Review (334): 65. Review of Amphora.
- review of 'Footnotes of a Hammock', by Gig Ryan, The Age, 16 October 2004 *Fairfax Syndication Photo Print Sales and Content Licensing
- Pushing Boundaries: Mark Roberts reviews amphora by joanne burns, Rochford Street Review, March 2013 *Pushing Boundaries: Mark Roberts reviews amphora by joanne burns
- Surreal Inventiveness: Peter Kirkpatrick launches 'brush' by joanne burns, Rochford Street Review, November 2014 *Surreal Inventiveness: Peter Kirkpatrick launches ‘brush’ by joanne burns
