= M. T. C. Cronin =

Contemporary Australian poet, lawyer and academic

M. T. C. Cronin (born 1963) is a contemporary Australian poet.

MTC Cronin has published more than twenty books (poetry, prose poems and essays) including several collections jointly written with the Australian poet and translator, Peter Boyle and another with Melbourne-based librettist and poet, Maria Zajkowski.

== Forthcoming books ==
- New & Selected Poems (Puncher & Wattmann, Newcastle, Australia, 2022–23)ISBN

== Bibliography ==
=== Poetry ===
- Zoetrope: we see us moving (Five Islands, Wollongong, Australia, 1995) ISBN 1-875604-34-0
- the world beyond the fig (Five Islands, Wollongong, Australia, 1998, shortlisted CJ Dennis Prize for Poetry, Victorian Premier's Literary Awards 1999) ISBN 0864186118
- Everything Holy (Balcones International Press, Temple, USA, 1998, shortlisted Jessie Litchfield Award for Literature 1997; shortlisted Age Book of the Year 1999; shortlisted Judith Wright Calanthe Prize for Poetry, Qld Premier's Literary Awards 1999; shortlisted Kenneth Slessor Prize for Poetry, NSW Premier's Literary Awards 2000; commended Wesley Michel Wright Prize for Poetry 1999) ISBN 1-891811-04-5 (review)
- Mischief-Birds (Vagabond Press, Sydney, Australia, 1999)
- Bestseller (Vagabond Press, Sydney, Australia, 2001, shortlisted John Bray Poetry Award, South Australian Festival Awards for Literature 2002; shortlisted Age Book of the Year 2002) ISBN 0-9578378-2-8
- Talking to Neruda's Questions (Vagabond Press, Sydney, Australia, 2001, ISBN 0-9578378-2-8 online at www.shearsman.com
- My Lover's Back (UQP, St Lucia, Australia, 2002, shortlisted John Bray Poetry Award, South Australian Festival Awards for Literature 2004) ISBN 0-7022-3284-X
- The Confetti Stone and other poems (Picaro Press, Warner's Bay, Australia, 2002) ISSN 1444-8424
- beautiful, unfinished ~ PARABLE/SONG/CANTO/POEM (Salt, Cambridge, UK, 2003, Book of the Month, Shearsman Books, UK, August 2003; shortlisted Kenneth Slessor Prize for Poetry, NSW Premier's Literary Awards 2004) ISBN 1-876857-29-3
- <More or Less Than> 1-100 (Shearsman, Exeter, UK, 2004, shortlisted Kenneth Slessor Prize for Poetry, NSW Premier's Literary Awards 2005; shortlisted Age Book of the Year 2005; winner CJ Dennis Prize for Poetry, Victorian Premier's Literary Awards 2005; winner Award for Innovation in Writing, South Australian Festival Awards for Literature 2006 ) ISBN 0-907562-47-7 excerpts 1-13, 88-100
- The Flower, the Thing (UQP, St Lucia, Australia, 2006, shortlisted WARM Literary Awards Book of the Year 2007) ISBN 0-7022-3556-3
- Our Life is a Box. / Prayers Without a God (Soi 3, Chiang Mai/Brisbane, Australia/Thailand, 2007)ISBN 978-0-9579411-4-4
- Notebook of Signs (& 3 Other Small Books) (Shearsman, Exeter, UK, 2007) ISBN 978-1-905700-11-0
- How Does a Man Who is Dead Reinvent His Body? (The Belated Love Poems of Thean Morris Caelli) (co-written with Peter Boyle, Shearsman Books, Exeter, UK, 2008) ISBN 978-1-84861-016-3
- Irrigations (of the Human Heart) ~ Fictional Essays on the Poetics of Living, Art & Love (Ravenna Press, Edmonds, USA, 200) ISBN 978-0-9822115-3-3
- Squeezing Desire Through a Sieve ~ micro-essays on judgement & justice (Puncher & Wattmann, Sydney, Australia, 2009, shortlisted Award for Innovation in Writing, South Australian Festival Awards for Literature 2010) ISBN 978-1-921450-12-9
- The World Last Night [metaphors for death] (UQP, St Lucia, Australia, 2012, highly commended, Prime Minister's Literary Awards 2013) ISBN 978-0-7022-4951-8
- in possession of loss (Shearsman, Exeter, UK, 2014) ISBN 978-1-84861-382-9
- The Law of Poetry (Puncher & Wattmann, Sydney, Australia, 2015) ISBN 978-1-9221866-1-4
- Causal ~ speaking the future (Spuyten Duyvil, New York, USA, 2018) ISBN 978-1-947980-51-8
- Sometimes the Soul (The Sophia Lexicon Press, Maleny, Australia, 2019)
- God is Waiting in the World's Yard (Puncher & Wattmann, Newcastle, Australia, 2019) ISBN 978-1-925780-06-2
- What We Have Except When We are Lost (co-written with Maria Zajkowski, Spuyten Duyvil, New York, USA, 2020) ISBN 978-1-949966-79-4
- A Ticket to Trilce (Shearsman, Exeter, UK, 2021) ISBN 978-1-84861-750-6
- Who Was By Alex Quel (co-written with Peter Boyle, Puncher & Wattmann, Newcastle, Australia, 2022) ISBN 978-1-922571-33-5

=== In translation ===
- Respondiendo a las Preguntas de Neruda in Spanish and English, trans. Juan Garrido Salgado (Safo, Santiago, Chile, 2004) ISBN 956-7661-04-9
- Controcanto al Libro Delle Domande di Neruda in Italian and English, trans. Hans Kitzmuller (Braitan, Brazzano, Italy, 2005) ISBN 88-86950-11-X
- The Ridiculous Shape of Longing: New and Selected Poems in English and Macedonian, trans. Igor Isakovski (Blesok, Skopje, Macedonia, 2005) ISBN 9989-928-51-7

=== Critical studies and reviews of Cronin's work ===
Notebook of signs

- Leves, Kerry (Autumn 2009). "Caught in the melee we look for signals : new poetry". Overland. 194: 89–92.

== External sources ==
- at Caesura
- 4 poems at softblow.org
- 4 poems at P76 Magazine Issue 6
- MTC Cronin at Poetry International Web
- 2 Poems
- 8 poems at Jack Magazine
- Review by John Bennett
- Launch speech by Peter Boyle for The Law of Poetry in Rochford Street Review
- Interview with MTC Cronin on Regime Books' Australian Poetry Podcast
