= Angela Malone =

Angela Malone (born in 1971) is the author of Lucia's Measure, the story of a giantess. It was shortlisted for the 2001 Christina Stead Fiction Prize, NSW Premier's Award. In 2008, she was awarded the Gwen Harwood Poetry Prize.

== Education ==
Angela Malone studied for her undergraduate degree at the University of Technology Sydney. She completed a master's degree in English at the University of Melbourne.
