= Lesley Walter =

Australian poet

Lesley Walter is an Australian poet. She holds a Master of Letters degree in Australian Literature from the University of Sydney, and is a past president of the Society of Women Writers NSW Inc. She lives in Sydney.

== Awards ==
- 2004 Gwen Harwood Poetry Prize

== Works ==
- "Hyphenated Lives", Island, No.101, Winter 2005
- Watermelon baby. Five Islands Press. 2000. ISBN 978-0-86418-667-6.
- Life Drawings. Walleah Press 2014. ISBN 978-1-877010-52-1

=== Anthologies ===
- Judith Beveridge; Martin Duwell; Bronwyn Lea, eds. (2006). The best Australian poetry 2006. University of Queensland Press. ISBN 978-0-7022-3568-9.

=== Non-fiction ===
- The Natural Way to Better Birth and Bonding (Random House, 2000)
