= S. K. Kelen =

Australian poet and educator (born 1956)

- Born: Stephen Kenneth Kelen; 1956 (age 69–70); Sydney, New South Wales, Australia
- Education: University of Sydney; University of Adelaide (PhD)
- Occupations: Poet; educator
- Writing career
- Notable awards: Judith Wright Award (2007)

Stephen Kenneth Kelen (born in Sydney in 1956), known as S. K. Kelen, is an Australian poet and educator. S. K. Kelen began publishing poetry in 1973, when he won the Poetry Australia Farmers Poetry Prize for young poets and several of his poems were published in that journal.

Kelen attended the University of Sydney, where he studied Philosophy and Literature. After graduating he worked in Sydney in various jobs then Canberra as a civil servant, and reviewed books for the Canberra Times. He has also been a visiting professor at the University of South Dakota in 1996, and Asialink Writer in Residence in Vietnam in 1998. In 2005 he completed a Ph.D. from the University of Adelaide. He taught poetry, creative writing and literary studies at the University of Canberra and taught in high schools and colleges in the ACT.

== Recognition ==
Kelen's collection Earthly Delights was a joint winner of the Judith Wright Prize in 2007.

Other awards won by Kelen include the 1973 Farmers Poetry Prize (writers under 18 years of age), the ACT Chief Minister's Creative Arts Fellowship in 2000, the CAPO (Capital Arts Patrons Organisation) Award in 2001 and in 2004 and 2007 - 2008 Australia Council Grants for Established Writers for poetry writing.

== Awards ==
=== Award for individual works ===
- The Cult of What Comes Next
  - 2025 Canberra Critics' Circle Award for Poetry
- Island Earth: New and selected poems. 2012 selected work poetry
  - 2013 - shortlisted ACT Book of the Year Award
- Earthly Delights 2006 selected work poetry
  - 2007 - shortlisted The Age Book of the Year Award — Dinny O'Hearn Poetry Prize
  - 2007 - joint winner Australian Capital Territory Poetry Award — Judith Wright Award for a Published Collection by an Australian Poet Joint winner with Diane Fahey for Sea Wall and River Light.
- Goddess of Mercy : Poems, 2002, selected work poetry
  - 2003 - shortlisted The Age Book of the Year Award — Dinny O'Hearn Poetry Prize
  - 2003 - shortlisted Victorian Premier's Literary Awards — The C. J. Dennis Prize for Poetry
  - 2003 highly commended Australian Capital Territory Book of the Year Award
- Shimmerings: Poems, 2000 selected work poetry
  - 2002 - shortlisted Festival Awards for Literature (SA) — John Bray Award for Poetry
- "Near the Jungle" 1976. short story 1976 - runner-up, University of Sydney Union Short Story Competition
- "Koki Market" 1976 - winner, University of Sydney Union Poetry Competition

== Book and Chapbook Publications ==
- The Gods Ash Their Cigarettes. St Lucia, Qld: Makar Press, 1978.
- To the Heart of the World’s Electricity. Broadway, NSW: Senor Press, 1980.
- Atomic Ballet. Sydney: Hale & Iremonger, 1991.
- Dingo Sky. Sydney: Angus & Robertson, 1993.
- West of Krakatoa: Poems. Ainslie, ACT: Limestone Press, 1994.
- Trans-Sumatran Highway, and other poems. Cook, ACT: Polonius Press, 1995.
- Postcards from the Universe. Cambridge, UK: Folio / Salt, 1998.
- Dragon Rising: Poems. Hanoi, Viet Nam: The Gioi Publishers, 1998.
- Shimmerings: Poems. Wollongong, NSW: Five Islands Press, 2000.
- Goddess of Mercy: Poems. Blackheath, NSW: Brandl & Schlesinger, 2002.
- Earthly Delights. Canberra: Pandanus Books, 2006.
- Island Earth: New and selected poems. Blackheath, NSW: Brandl & Schlesinger, 2012
- Don Juan Variations. Sydney: Vagabond Press, Rare Object Series, 2012
- Yonder Blue Wild. Macao, PRC: flying island books, 2018
- A Happening in Hades. Waratah, NSW: Puncher & Wattmann, 2020
- Love's Philosophy. Sydney, NSW: Gazebo Books / Life Before Man, 2020
- The Cult of What Comes Next. Waratah, NSW: Puncher & Wattmann, 2025

== Anthologies ==
- Poems included in ~
- Anthology of Australian Religious Poetry, ed. Les Murray (Melbourne: Collins/Dove, 1986)
- The Penguin Book of Modern Australian Poetry, ed. John Tranter & Philip Mead (Melbourne: Penguin, 1991)
- Oxford Book of Modern Australian Verse, ed. Peter Porter (Oxford University Press, 1996)
- Family Ties: poems of the Australian Family ed. Jennifer Strauss (Oxford University Press, 1998)
- Landbridge: Contemporary Australian Poetry ed. John Kinsella (Fremantle Arts Centre Press, 1999)
- Open Boat, Barbed Wire Sky: Poems for the Refugees ed Sue Hicks and Danny Gardner (Live Poets’ Press, Sydney 2003)
- The Best Australian Poems 2003 ed Peter Craven (Black Ink, Melbourne 2003)
- The Best Australian Poems 2004 ed Les Murray (Black Ink, Melbourne 2003)
- Windchimes: Asia in Australian Poetry ed Noel Rowe and Vivian Smith (Pandanus, Canberra 2006)
- Best Australian Poems 2007, ed. Peter Rose (Black Inc, Melbourne 2007)
- Best Australian Poetry 2007, ed. John Tranter (UQP, St Lucia, 2007)
- Che Guevara in Verse ed. Gavin O’Toole and Georgina Jimanez (Aflame Books, Wiltshire, 2007
- Over There – Poems from Singapore and Australia ed. John Kinsella and Alvin Pang
- Penguin Anthology of Australian Poetry, ed John Kinsella, (Penguin, 2008)
- The Perfume River: An Anthology of Writing from Vietnam, ed. Catherine Cole (UWA Publishing 2010)
- The Best Australian Poems 2012 ed John Tranter (Black Ink, Melbourne 2012)
- The Turnrow Anthology Of Contemporary Australian Poetry, ed. John Kinsella, Jack Heflin and William Ryan (Desperation Press/Tunrow Books, USA 2013)
- The Best Australian Poems 2014 ed Geoff Page (Black Ink, Melbourne 2014)
- The House is Not Quiet and The World is Not Calm: poetry from Canberra, ed Kit Kelen and Geoff Page (Association of Stories, Macao, 2014)
- Contemporary Australian Poetry, ed Martin Langford, Judith Beveridge, Judy Johnson, David Musgrave (Puncher &Wattmann, Sydney, 2016)

== Literary publications ==
Poems, short stories and book reviews have appeared in Australian and overseas magazines, newspapers and ezines, including: The (Melbourne) Age, Agenda (UK), The American Pen (US), Antipodes (US), ANU Reporter, Aspect, The Australian, Australian Book Review, Block, The Bulletin, Chili Verde Review (US), Canberra Times, Cimarron Review (US), Compass, Cordite, Diwan (Bosnia and Herzegovina), Eclectica, Editions, Education, Etchings, Final Taxi Review, fieralingue, foam:e, Fulcrum, Heat, Hobo, Honi Soit, Imago, Iron (UK), Island, JAAM (NZ), Jack (US), Jacket, Journal of Poetics Research, The Literary Review (US), The Longneck (US), Madame Bull's Tavern (Canada), Magic Sam, Masthead, Meanjin, Metre (Ireland), Meuse, Muse, Narcissus, Nation Review, Newcastle Herald, New Poetry, Nguoi HaNoi ‘Hanoi People’ (Vietnam), Nimrod International: journal of poetry and prose (US), Otis Rush, Outrider, Overland, The Pen (UK), Poetry Australia, Poetry Canada, Poetry Kanto (Japan), Poetry Review (UK), poetryX, Poets Choice '76, '77, 78, 79, Polar Bear, Prague Literary Review (Czech), Prism International (Canada), P-76, The Reader, Salt, Melbourne Sunday Herald, Scripsi, Siglo, Slow Dancer (UK), South Dakota Review (US), Southerly, Stand (UK), Surfers Paradise, Sydney Morning Herald, Taj Mahal Review (India), Tien Ve, Thylazine, Timber Creek Review (US), Union Recorder, Verse (US), Vietnam Cultural Window (Vietnam), Voice and Verse (Hong Kong), Voices, Your Friendly Fascist. Poems have also been broadcast by the Australian Broadcasting Corporation on the Poet's Tongue, a First Hearing and Poetica. Other broadcasts on 5UV Writers Radio, 2JJ, 2SER-FM, 2CN, Canberra Artsound.
