= Spinifex Press =

Australian independent feminist book publisher

- Founded: 1991
- Founders: Renate Klein and Susan Hawthorne
- Country of origin: Australia
- Headquarters location: North Geelong, Victoria
- Distribution: self-distributed (Australia); Independent Publishers Group (North America); Gazelle Book Services (UK)
- Publication types: Books
- Official website: www.spinifexpress.com.au

Spinifex Press is an independent feminist book publisher based in Australia. It was established in March 1991 by Renate Klein and Susan Hawthorne, initially operating out of their apartment. The press is named after spinifex grass, a name chosen for its Australian and ecological associations, as well as "femininist reverberations...like spinning and spinster". In 2003, one scholar described it as "Australia's most visible and commercially successful contemporary feminist press".

It has over 200 titles in print and publishes both fiction and non-fiction on subjects of feminist interest including lesbian literature, women's health, writing by indigenous, Asian and African women and books discussing ecology, globalisation, violence against women, prostitution and pornography. Its first book, Angels of Power, was a collection of fiction and poetry critical of in vitro fertilisation, described by The Sydney Morning Herald as "witty...but also unbalanced and didactic". Spinifex has published books by gender-critical feminists.

Spinifex was one of the earliest Australian publishers to adapt to new technologies by offering a web-based catalogue and enabling on-line purchase of all titles. It has been publishing ebooks since 2006.

Spinifex Press celebrated its 25th anniversary in September 2016 with a two-day conference for radical feminists culminating in the drafting of a radical feminist manifesto. In March 2021 Spinifex celebrated its 30th anniversary on Zoom with an event titled "Welcome to Country", showcasing Indigenous Australian writing.

Authors are Australian and international and include Sheila Jeffreys, Melinda Tankard Reist, Finola Moorhead, Diane Bell, Merlinda Bobis, Beryl Fletcher, Unity Dow, Maria Mies, Rose Zwi, Fethiye Çetin, Dale Spender, Mary Daly, Janice Raymond, Vandana Shiva and Julie Bindel.
