= Sarah Day =

Australian poet

Sarah Day (born 1958) is an English-born Australian poet and teacher. She was also the poetry editor of Island Magazine for several years.

== Biography ==
Sarah E Day was born in Lancashire, England, in 1958 and grew up in Hobart, Tasmania. She lives today with her husband and two daughters in Hobart. After obtaining a degree from University of Melbourne, she then taught English at Devonport and Hobart school. Along with the subject she and taught creative writing at a college level. She was also one of the head members of the Literature Fund of the Australian Council, along with becoming the poetry editor at Island Magazine for many years. Day had started her poem publishing journey in the early 1980s, her pieces are featured in the Westerly, Quadrant and Island Magazine routinely. Since her first novel, she has six other collections, along with a volume of New and Selected Poems.

In 2002, Days' New and Selected Poems was published by Arc in the UK, being the same place where it received Special Commendation by the Poetry Book Society. She was a recipient of grants from the Literature Fund of Australia Council and Arts Tasmania. She was welcomed to the Festival de Poesie in Paris both in 2001 and 2004. She also was invited and appeared at Australian festivals like Adelaide, Melbourne and Mildura, etc. Her first novel A Hunger to Be Less Serious was written into four sectors which included poems Voices from Titree, Fountain Blue, Anemones and Hawk.

== Bibliography ==
- A Hunger to Be Less Serious (1987), (winner of the Anne Elder Award for the first volume of poetry)
- A Madder Dance (1992)
- Quickening (1997)
- Easter Train (2000)
- New and Selected Poems(2002)
- The Ship (2004) Brandl & Schlesinger, Blackheath NSW ISBN 1876040599
- Grass Notes (2009) Brandl & Schlesinger, Blackheath NSW ISBN 9781921556081
- Tempo (c.2013) Puncher and Wattman, Glebe NSW ISBN 9781922186379
- Towards Light & Other Poems (2018) Puncher and Wattman, Glebe NSW ISBN 9781925780024
- Slack Tide (2022) Pitt Street Poetry ISBN 978-1-922776-02-0

== Awards and recognition ==
Day's 2004 book, The Ship, won the Queensland Premier's Award and Judith Wright Calanthe Award for poetry (2005), and the University of Melbourne Wesley Michel Wright Prize (2004). It was also joint winner of the inaugural Judith Wright Award for a Published Collection by an Australian Poet presented by the Australian Capital Territory National Poetry Prize.

Slack Tide was shortlisted for the Tim Thorne Prize for Poetry at the 2025 Tasmanian Literary Awards.

She was longlisted for the 2025 Elizabeth Jolley Short Story Prize for "The Plain".
