= Blood and Bone (Hodgins collection) =

1986 poetry collection by Philip Hodgins

- Author: Philip Hodgins
- Language: English
- Genre: Poetry collection
- Publisher: Angus and Robertson
- Publication date: 1986
- Publication place: Australia
- Media type: Print
- Pages: 60 pp.
- Awards: 1987 NSW Premier's Literary Award – Kenneth Slessor Prize for Poetry, winner
- ISBN: 0207154074

Blood and Bone is a collection of poems by Australian poet Philip Hodgins, published by Angus and Robertson in Australia in 1986.

The collection contains 53 poems from a variety of sources.

The collection won the 1987 NSW Premier's Literary Award – Kenneth Slessor Prize for Poetry.

== Contents ==
- "Platform Verse"
- "Room 1 Ward 10 West 12/11/83"
- "Room 3 Ward 10 West 17/11/83"
- "Room 1 Ward 10 West 23/11/83"
- "A Palinode"
- "Leaving Hospital"
- "Catharsis"
- "Kite"
- "The Dam"
- "The Wait"
- "Clockwork"
- "The Universal Pig"
- "Country Football"
- "Making Hay"
- "Question Time"
- "Ontology"
- "Insomnia"
- "Self-Pity"
- "The Cause of Death"
- "Lives of the Drunkards"
- "Instant Roundel"
- "The Barbecue"
- "A Difficult Calf"
- "Burning Toast"
- "The Haystack"
- "The Needle"
- "Hieroglyphs"
- "The Change"
- "The Pressure"
- "Death Who"
- "Lunch by the Tennis Court"
- "The Birds"
- "Spleen"
- "Ten Things about It"
- "Walking Through the Crop"
- "Planting Them"
- "A Bit of Bitterness"
- "Ich Bin Allein"
- "The Guest"
- "Dead Calf"
- "Trip Cancelled"
- "Apologies"
- "The Shoot"
- "The Passenger"
- "From County Down"
- "Resurrection"
- "An Education"
- "Troppo Island"
- "Hotel Minerva"
- "Sant'Ivo della Sapienza"
- "Radio Thanatos"
- "Bad News"
- "The Shortlist"

== Critical reception ==
Judith Rodriguez, in The Sydney Morning Herald, thought the poems in this collection were "of a high order". She notes the author's terminal illness and finds that "The process of concentration...is explicitly the subject of many poems in the book."

In The Age Monthly Review Paul Carter finds "These poems 'written dumb with fear' are meant to bring readers back to speech, back to a language which retains its power to speak. Hodgins is not looking, like Canetti, for 'a word to rehabilitate and justify all words for him.' He can find no solace in the world's distant descent from God. Yet he clings to language's powers of self-recovery."

== Awards ==
- 1987 NSW Premier's Literary Award – Kenneth Slessor Prize for Poetry, winner

== Notes ==
- Rod Usher interviewed the author about the collection for The Age newspaper.

== See also ==
- 1987 in Australian literature
