= Graham Rowlands =

Australian poet

Graham John Rowlands (born 1947) is an Adelaide-based poet who has published widely in magazines and newspapers since the late 1960s. He was awarded the Barbara Hanrahan Fellowship in 2002.

Rowlands is originally from Brisbane, moving to South Australia's capital in the early 1970s, publishing seven poetry collections in the two decades that followed, including Stares and Statues in 1972. It is estimated that his works number upwards of 1000. He has a Masters of Arts from the University of Queensland and a PhD from Flinders University, and has worked as a journalist and editor in both the poetry and education fields.

While a prolific poet, Graham is an enthusiastic reader (out loud) of his own poetry, and has always been a generous supporter of the poetry of others. He has remained a person and a writer who fits generally within the traditions of the left, although he has expressed admiration for the work of Les Murray, generally considered Australia's best known poet, who is on many aesthetic and social dimensions aligned with the right. Other influences on his work are more consistent with his leftish persuasion. These include the historian and writer Humphrey McQueen and poet/novelists Rodney Hall .

His own writing is energetic and vigorous. He often begins his poems with elegant abstract images, such as in his early poem LIVES:

As the elegant table-leg of the eagle
Holds a ball in its talons…

Then finishes the poem sudden personal intensity:

I, who see in Orange lava below the crust
My hot fluid self burning,
Moving and burning alive in my skin.
