= Elizabeth Campbell (poet) =

Australian poet

Elizabeth Campbell is an Australian poet.

== Biography ==
Elizabeth Campbell was born in Melbourne in 1980. She graduated from the University of Melbourne with an Honours Degree in English in 2000. She taught English at Eltham High School and MacRobertson Girls' High School, Victoria.

She has published two collections of verse, Letters to the Tremulous Hand and Error, both published by John Leonard Press.

Campbell's poetry has been widely published and anthologised, and she been the recipient of multiple awards and residencies for her poetry.

The author visited Ireland in 2010 with the Vincent Buckley Prize. Following this, she completed an Australia Council residency in Rome. Several of Campbell's poems were included in the 2011 landmark anthology of Australian poetry, Australian Poetry Since 1788.

== Works ==
=== Poetry ===
- Letters to the Tremulous Hand. (Melbourne: John Leonard Press, 2007)
- Error. (Melbourne: John Leonard Press, 2011)

=== Anthologies ===
- The Puncher and Wattman Anthology of Australian Poetry. (Sydney: Puncher & Wattmann, 2010)
- Australian Poetry Since 1788. Geoffrey Lehmann (ed.), Robert Gray (ed.) (Sydney: UNSW Press, 2011)
- Young Poets: An Australian Anthology. (Melbourne: John Leonard Press, 2011)

== Awards ==
- Gwen Harwood Poetry Prize, 2006
- Vincent Buckley Poetry Prize, 2010
