= Judith Wright (artist) =

Australian artist

- Born: 1945 (age 80–81); Brisbane
- Education: Queensland University of Technology
- Awards: Arts Queensland Fellowship, 1993; Queensland Government Professional Development grant, 1998

Judith Wright (born 1945) in Meanjin (Brisbane) is a multidisciplinary artist whose practice spans installation, video, sculpture, painting, drawing, printmaking and assemblage.

Her work explores universal human experiences of loss, impermanence and vulnerability. Wright’s figurative sculptural installations use theatrical props and lighting to investigate these themes, and reflect her experience as a dancer in The Australian Ballet.

== Education and career ==
Wright graduated from the Queensland University of Technology in 2002 with a Master in Fine Art.

Wright has a background in dance, and was a dancer for The Australian Ballet before beginning her visual arts practice in the 1970s. She worked as a lecturer at both the Queensland University of Technology and the Queensland College of Art at Griffith University. She was a Queensland Art Gallery Board Member from 1999-2002.

== Awards ==
Wright received an Arts Queensland fellowship in 1993, as well as a Queensland Government Professional Development grant in 1998.

== Exhibitions ==
Wright has exhibited solo exhibitions in public institutions in Australia including the QUT Art Museum, Brisbane; Artspace, Mackay; Performance Space, Sydney; Institute of Modern Art, Brisbane; and the Australian Centre for Photography, Sydney.

Group exhibitions have included Lurid Beauty: Australian Surrealism and its Echoes at the National Gallery of Victoria ; All our relations, 18th Biennale of Sydney; and Contemporary Australia: Women, The Queensland Art Gallery, Gallery of Modern Art, Brisbane.

=== Solo ===
- Judith Wright: Desire, QUT Art Museum, Queensland University of Technology, Brisbane (2014)
- Judith Wright – conversations, UQ Art Museum, Brisbane (2008)
- Judith Wright: Breath and Other Considerations, Artspace, Mackay, Queensland (2007)
- Judith Wright: selected video works 1997–2004, Performance Space, Sydney (2005)
- One Dances, Creative Industries Precincts, Queensland University of Technology, Brisbane (2004)
- Blind of Sight, Institute of Modern Art, Brisbane (2002)
- Projections for Eliza, University Art Museum, University of Queensland, Brisbane (1999)
- Silent Measure, Australian Centre for Photography, Sydney (1996).

=== Group ===
- Meet the Artists, State Library of Queensland (2023)
- Lurid Beauty: Australian Surrealism and its Echoes, National Gallery of Victoria, Melbourne (2015)
- All our relations, 18th Biennale of Sydney, Museum of Contemporary Art Australia, Cockatoo Island, Sydney (2012)
- Contemporary Australia: Women, The Gallery of Modern Art, Brisbane (2012); Black Box White Cube, Arts Centre Melbourne, Melbourne (2011)
- Contemporary Encounters, National Gallery of Victoria, Melbourne (2010)
- Where Angels Tread, Contemporary Art Centre of South Australia, Adelaide (2006)
- Slow Rushes: Takes on the documentary sensibility in moving images from around Asia and the Pacific, Contemporary Art Centre, Vilnius, Lithuania (2005)
- Home with No Walls, Open Circle and Sahmat, Mumbai, India (2003).

== Collections ==
Wright's work is held in state and national collections, including:

- Artbank, Sydney
- Arts Centre Melbourne, Melbourne
- Art Gallery of New South Wales, Sydney
- Canberra School of Art, Australian National University, Canberra
- Kawaguchi Museum of Contemporary Art, Saitama, Japan
- National Gallery of Australia, Canberra
- National Gallery of Victoria, Melbourne
- Parliament House Collection, Canberra
- Queensland Art Gallery | Gallery of Modern Art, Brisbane
- The University of Sydney, Sydney
