= Kathryn Lomer =

Australian writer

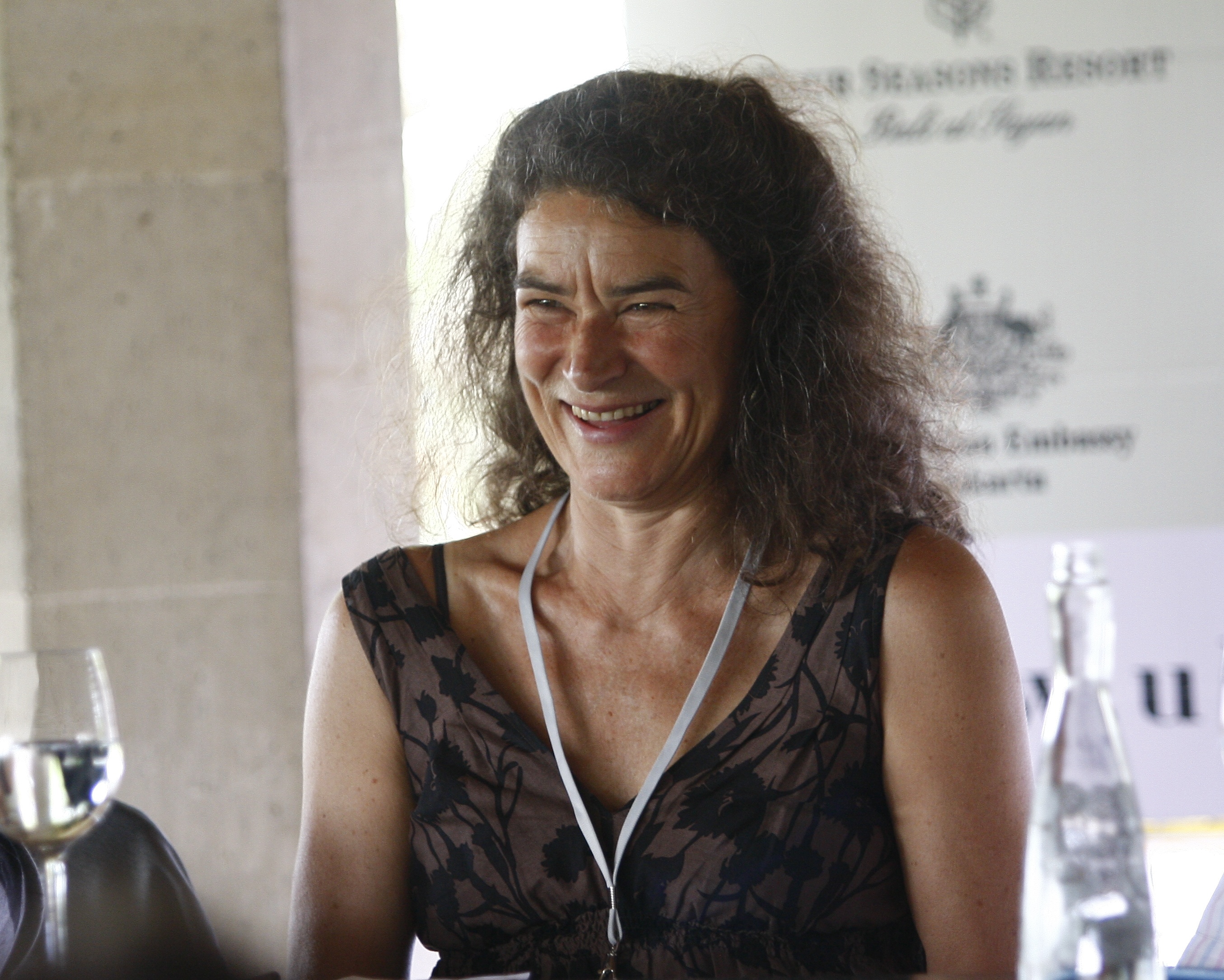
Kathryn Lomer on Ubud Writers & Readers Festival 2012

Kathryn Lomer (born 1958) is an Australian novelist, young adult novelist, short story writer and poet. She has also written for screen, with one short film credit to date.

== Writing ==
Her first novel, The God in the Ink was published by the University of Queensland Press in 2001. Her first book of poetry, Extraction of Arrows, also published by UQP, was released in September 2003. Since then she has published two YA novels, a collection of short stories and two more collections of poetry, all with UQP.

Her poetry has been favourably compared with that of fellow Australian poet, Jennifer Maiden.

She currently resides in Hobart in her native Tasmania.

== Awards ==
- The 2003/2004 Anne Elder Award for Extraction of Arrows.
- The 2008 Kenneth Slessor Poetry Prize (The New South Wales Premier's Literary Awards) 2008 for Two Kinds of Silence.
- The 2011 Margaret Scott Prize (The Tasmanian Premier's Literary Prizes) for "What now, Tilda B?".

She has also won the Gwen Harwood Poetry Prize, the Melbourne Poets' Union (MPU), Josephine Ulrick and ANUTECH poetry prizes.

== Publications ==
- The God in the Ink, (2001)
- Extraction of Arrows, (2003)
- The Spare Room, (2005)
- Two Kinds of Silence, (2007)
- Camera Obscura, (2008)
- What now, Tilda B?, (2010)
- Night Writing, (2014)
- Talk Under Water, (2015)
- AfterLife, (2023)
