= Jill Jones (poet) =

Australian poet (born 1951)

- Born: 1951 (age 74–75); Sydney, New South Wales, Australia
- Occupation: Poet
- Writing career
- Notable awards: 1993 Mary Gilmore Prize

Jill Jones (born 1951) is a poet and writer from Sydney, Australia. She is a senior lecturer at the University of Adelaide.

== Career ==
In 1993, Jones won the Mary Gilmore Prize for her first book of poetry, The Mask and the Jagged Star (Hazard Press). Her third book, The Book of Possibilities (Hale & Iremonger), was published in 1997. It was shortlisted for the National Book Council 'Banjo' Awards and the Adelaide Festival Awards.

Her fourth book, Screens, Jets, Heaven: New and Selected Poems, was published by Salt Publishing in 2002. It won the 2003 Kenneth Slessor Prize for Poetry (NSW Premier's Literary Awards).

Her fifth full-length book, Broken/Open was published by Salt Publishing in 2005. It was shortlisted for The Age Poetry Book of the Year 2005 and the Kenneth Slessor Poetry Prize 2006.

Jones served as a judge for the 1995 NSW Premier's Literary Awards and for the inaugural Broadway Poetry Prize in 2001.

A History of What I'll Become was shortlisted for the 2021 Kenneth Slessor Prize for Poetry (NSW Premier's Literary Awards) and for the 2022 Adelaide Festival Awards for Literature John Bray Poetry Award. In 2021 she also won the Wesley Michel Wright Prize.

She won the 2026 Kenneth Slessor Prize for Poetry for How to Emerge. It was shortlisted for the Poetry award at the Prime Minister's Literary Awards in the same year.

== Bibliography ==
=== Poetry ===
Collections and chapbooks

- The Mask and the Jagged Star, Hazard Press 1992
- Flagging Down Time, Five Islands Press, Wollongong, 1993
- The Book of Possibilities, Hale and Iremonger, Sydney, 1997
- Screens Jets Heaven: New and Selected Poems, Salt Publishing, Cambridge, 2002
- Struggle and Radiance: Ten Commentaries, Wild Honey Press, Bray, 2004 (chapbook)
- Where the Sea Burns, Picaro Press, Warners Bay, 2004 (chapbook)
- Fold Unfold, Vagabond Press, Sydney, 2005 (chapbook)
- Broken/Open, Salt Publishing, Cambridge, 2005
- Dark Bright Doors, Wakefield Press, Adelaide, 2010
- Ash is Here, So are Stars, Walleah Press, North Hobart, 2012
- Senses Working Out, Vagabond Press, Sydney, 2012
- Even If the Signal Fails, Black Rider Press, Perth, 2013
- The Beautiful Anxiety, Puncher & Wattmann, Glebe, NSW, 2014
- Breaking the Days, Whitmore Press, Geelong, 2015
- The Leaves Are My Sisters, Little Windows Press, Adelaide, 2016
- Brink, Five Islands Press, Melbourne, 2017
- The Quality of Light and Other Poems, Garron Publishing, Adelaide, 2017
- Viva the Real, University of Queensland Press, St Lucia, Queensland, 2018
- A History of What I'll Become, UWA Publishing, Crawley, Western Australia, 2020
- Wild Curious Air, Recent Work Press, Canberra, 2020
- Acrobat Music: New & Selected Poems, Puncher & Wattmann, Glebe, 2022
- How to Emerge, Vagabond, 2025

=== Selected critical studies and reviews of Jones' work ===
Wild Curious Air

- Beesley, Luke (January–February 2021). "It Must Have Been Moonglow". Australian Book Review. 428: 53–54.
