= Adam Aitken =

Australian poet

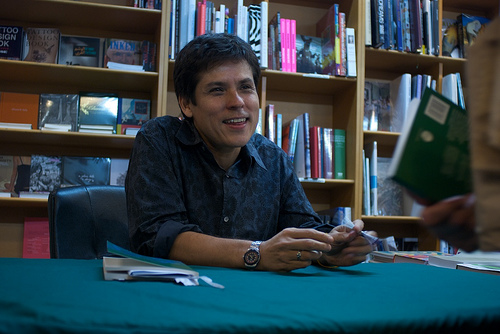
- Aitken signing copies of Eighth Habitation at Gleebooks, 2009
- Born: 1960 (age 65–66); London
- Occupation: Poet
- Writing career
- Genre: Poetry
- Website: adamaitken.blog//

Adam Aitken (born 1960) is an Australian poet.

== Early life and education ==
Australian writer Adam Aitken was born in London in 1960. He spent his early childhood with relatives in Thailand, and was educated at a convent in Malaysia, then a school in Perth Western Australia, before his family moved to Sydney, Australia in 1969. His father was born in Melbourne and as a young man worked as a copy-writer and advertising executive, then re-trained as a landscape architect. He was a respected ceramics critic and in the early 1970s was an activist in the Anti-Vietnam War Moratorium movement. His mother is Thai and worked in the Samuel Taylor Factory in Sydney, then as an interpreter.

Aitken majored in English and Art Film History at the University of Sydney. There he studied the Metaphysical poets, Shakespeare, the Augustan poets and the Romantics, then moved on to courses in Modern American poetry and fiction under Don Anderson and Jim Tulip. There he studied creative writing informally at lunch time poetry workshops convened by Dennis Haskell, and became part of a loose community of poets then based in inner-city Sydney, including Gig Ryan, John Forbes, John Tranter, Pam Brown, Kit Kelen, Stephen Kelen, and Anna Couani.

He also completed a Master's in linguistics and a Doctorate in Creative Arts from the Centre for New Writing, University of Technology, Sydney. His doctoral thesis was titled "Writing the hybrid: Asian imaginaries in Australian literature". He was associate poetry editor for HEAT magazine.

== Career ==
Aitken began writing in the mid-1970s. He has published seven full-length collections of poetry, and his work appears in numerous literary journals and poetry anthologies.

He is considered to be a poet of no particular school or trend, postcolonial and lyrical, and with a postmodern commitment to language play and experimentation. As with his contemporaries post-1968, his influences have been broad, but predominantly those of modern German, French, British and American poets, including some of the New York School. Aitken's poems "fulfil the old Horatian ideal of both teaching and delighting".

In 1996, his second poetry collection, In One House, was considered by The Australian newspaper one of the best poetry collections of that year. In 2001, his third collection Romeo and Juliet in Subtitles, was shortlisted for the John Bray South Australian Literary Festival Award, and was runner-up for The Age Book of the Year poetry prize. In 2009, his fourth collection, Eighth Habitation, was published by Giramondo Press and shortlisted for the 2010 John Bray Award. His memoir One Hundred Letters Home (Vagabond Press, 2016) was longlisted for the Association for the Study of Australian Literature Gold Medal. In 2018, Aitken's collection Archipelago was shortlisted for the Kenneth Slessor Prize for Poetry and the Prime Minister's Literary Awards.

In 2000 Aitken successfully collaborated with landscape architect Gillian Smart and the Centennial Park Trust to provide inscriptions and a commemoration of the First Peoples for the Avenue of Nations sculpture. According to Centennial Parklands, Smart's "sculpture was developed as a vehicle for communication, a connection, between cultures. It features a series of hanging shells crafted from bronze, with selected words celebrating Australian society, engraved on them. Hands upon Hands is interactive and tactile, and encourages unity through experience. Over time and use, the layering of hands on the shells will enhance its meaning, and reinforce the unity and diversity of our cultural backgrounds."

His writing continues to demonstrate a deep interest in issues of cross-cultural identity and family connection in a transnational context, and cultural hybridity.

Aitken's work has been translated into French, Swedish, German, Polish, Malay, Mandarin and Russian, and is published internationally, most notably in Poetry Magazine. He has also served as a co-editor (with Kim Cheng Boey and Michelle Cahill) of the Contemporary Asian Australian Poets anthology, a book included in the NSW High School English syllabus as of 2013.

In December 2021 he won the Patrick White Award.

Aitken's seventh collection is Revenants (Giramondo Press 2022). It was shortlisted for the 2023 Kenneth Slessor Prize for Poetry.

== Bibliography ==
=== Poetry ===
Collections

- Letter to Marco Polo, Island Press, 1985
- In One House, HarperCollins/Paper Bark Press, 1996
- Crossing Lake Toba, Folio / Salt, 1998
- Romeo And Juliet in Subtitles, Brandl & Schlesinger, 2000
- Eighth Habitation, Giramondo Publishing, 2009
- One Hundred Letters Home, Vagabond Press, 2016
- Archipelago, Vagabond Press, 2017
- Revenants, Giramondo Publishing, 2022

Chapbooks

- Impermanence.com, Vagabond Press, 2004
- The Bats of Angkor Wat, Picaro Press, 2011
- Tonto's Revenge, TinFish Press, 2011
- November Already, Vagabond Press, 2013
- Notes on the River, Little Window Press, 2017

Anthologies (edited)

- Contemporary Asian Australian Poets, Puncher and Wattmann, 2013. Edited by Adam Aitken, Kim Cheng Boey and Michelle Cahill.

Selected list of poems

Title	Year	First published	Reprinted/collected
Pol Pot in Paris	2008	Aitken, Adam (2008). "Pol Pot in Paris". Jacket. 36.	Aitken, Adam (2009). "Pol Pot in Paris". In Adamson, Robert (ed.). The best Australian poems 2009. Melbourne: Black Inc. pp. 3–4.
Discoveries made collecting botanic samples	2009	Aitken, Adam (Autumn 2009). "Discoveries made collecting botanic samples". Overland. 194: 73.	
