= Wesley Michel Wright Prize =

Australian poetry award

The Wesley Michel Wright Prize is an Australian poetry prize named in honour of Wesley Michel Wright in recognition of his bequest to the University of Melbourne. It is awarded annually.

== History ==
Wesley Michel Wright graduated from the University of Melbourne in 1951. In his will he left a bequest to the university. Wright died in 1963 and the award was subsequently inaugurated. The first known recipient was Leon Slade in 1962. John Tranter, Judy Johnson and Sarah Day have won twice. In 2023, the prize is valued at A$4,300.

== Entry conditions ==
Entry is open to Australian citizens for a poem or poetry collection published in the previous twelve months. Poems to be from 50 to 500 lines long.

== Winners ==
This list is drawn from the AustLit database:

Year	Winner(s)	Notes
1982	Leon Slade	
1983	Alex Skovron	
1984	— (no award)	
1985	John Scott	
1985	Frank Kellaway	
1986	Philip Hodgins	
1987	Diane Fahey	
1988	Laurie Duggan	
1989	David Herkt	
1989	John Tranter	
1990	Ken Bolton	
1991	Jordie Albiston	
1991	Jan Owen	
1992	Peter Boyle	
1993	John Tranter	
1994	Dimitris Tsaloumas	
1995	Bruce Beaver	
1996	Thomas Shapcott	
1997	Judith Beveridge	
1998	Jean Kent	
1999	Margaret Bradstock	
2000	Judy Johnson	
2001	Bronwyn Lea	
2002	Martin Harrison	
2003	Chris Andrews	
2004	Sarah Day	
2005	— (no award)	
2006	— (no award)	
2007	— (no award)	
2008	Caroline Caddy	
2009	Emily Ballou	
2010	— (no award)	
2011	Rosanna Licari	
2012	A. Frances Johnson	
2013	Judy Johnson	
2014	Sarah Day	
2015	— (no award)	
2016	— (no award)	
2017	Susan Fealy	
2018	John Kinsella	
2019	Kevin Brophy	
2020	Zenobia Frost	
2021	Jill Jones	
2022	Lisa Gorton	
2023	Stuart Barnes	
2024	Jarad Bruinstroop	
