= Martin Duwell =

Australian poetry editor, reviewer and publisher

Martin Duwell (born 1948, in England) is an Australian poetry editor, reviewer and publisher. Duwell is recognized as a leading poetry reviewer in Australia, as well as for his "significant contribution to the recognition and development of new poetry in Australia".

== Life ==
Duwell was educated at the University of Queensland and has maintained a long association with the university as a teacher, scholar and editor for the poetry magazine Makar (1968–80) and the related Gargoyle Poets Series (1972–80).

Throughout his career, Duwell's reviews of new publications have appeared frequently in many Australian magazines and newspapers. In 1982 he published A Possible Contemporary Poetry: Interviews with Thirteen Poets from the New Australian Poetry. He was also the poetry editor for the University of Queensland Press for several years during the 1980s. Duwell formalised his strength in contemporary poetry with a 1988 PhD thesis that explored the influence of contemporary American poetry on a selection of Australian poets. He was also co-editor of the Penguin Literary History of Australian Literature (1988), and worked with Robert Dixon on two collections of Aboriginal song poems: The Honey-Ant Men's Love Song and Other Aboriginal Song Poems (1990), and Little Eva at Moonlight Creek and Other Aboriginal Song Poems (1994).

A co-editor of Australian Literary Studies since 1982, Duwell also edited the ALS Guide to Australian Writers (1992) and several other publications, including John Blight's Selected Poems 1939-1990 (1992). In 2003 he edited the first in a series of Best Australian Poetry, a selection of poems that appear in periodicals during each year.

== Publications ==
Duwell was the co-editor of The Best Australian Poetry series and the editor of 37 books of poetry in the Gargoyle Poets Series, Makar Press and was the editor of Makar magazine from 1968 to 1980.
