= Philip Hammial =

Australian poet

- Born: Detroit, Michigan
- Occupations: Poet, publisher, editor, artist, art curator
- Known for: Poetry and art
- Children: One child

Philip Roby Hammial is an Australian poet, publisher, editor, artist and art curator. His achievements include thirty-eight collections of poetry, thirty-four solo sculpture exhibitions, and, acting as the director/curator of The Australian Collection of Outsider Art, twenty-six exhibitions of Australian Outsider Art in five countries.

Hammial's significance to Australian poetry has been recognised by the Australia Council, which awarded him a Senior Writer's Fellowship in 1996, an Established Writer's Fellowship in 2004 and the Nancy Keesing Studio at the Cité internationale des arts in Paris in 2009.

== Literary and artistic career ==
Hammial has published thirty-eight collections of poetry. He is also the editor with Ulli Beier and Rudi Krausmann of the seminal "Outsider Art in Australia". He has written many poems published in numerous journals and countries.

In 2006 he edited "25 poetes australiens", the first anthology of Australian poetry in the French language. The edition of 1000 sold out in Europe and Canada. As the director of The Australian Collection of Outsider Art, he has curated or helped to organise twenty-six exhibitions of Australian Outsider Art – in Australia, Germany, France, Belgium and the United States. The most recent exhibition – "Australian Outsiders" (23 artists) – spent two months at the Orange Regional Gallery, seven weeks at the Hazelhurst Regional Gallery and then went to the Halle St. Pierre in Paris for six months (September 2006 to February 2007) where it was very well received. Hammial himself is also an artist. He has had thirty-four solo exhibitions and his work has been included in over seventy group exhibitions, including two in Paris. His work can be found at the Rex-Livingston Gallery in Katoomba, NSW, Australia. In 1979 he succeeded Philip Roberts as editor of Island Press.

Two of his poetry collections were short-listed for the Kenneth Slessor Prize – "Bread" in 2001 and "In the Year of Our Lord Slaughter's Children" in 2004 and one was short-listed for the ACT Poetry Book Prize – "Skin Theory" in 2010. His thirty-second collection, "Detroit and Selected Poems", was published by Sheep Meadow Press in NY State, one of the oldest and most prestigious poetry presses in the U.S. He has represented Australia at fifteen international poetry festivals – Poetry Africa 2000 and 2016 in Durban, South Africa; the Festival Franco-Anglais de Poesie, Paris, 2000 and 2015; The World Festival of Poets, Tokyo, 2000; the Festival International de la Poésie, Trois-Rivières, 2004 and 2018; the Micro Festival, Prague, 2009 and 2015; the Festival Franco-Anglais de Poesie, Melbourne, 2010; the Festival Internacional de Poesia de Medellin (Colombia) 2012; the Festival Internacional de Poesia de Granada (Nicaragua) 2014; the Val-de-Marne International Poetry Festival, Paris, 2015; the Struga Poetry Evenings, Struga, Macedonia, 2015 and the Istanbul Writers' Festival in 2016. In 2001 he had a one-month writer-in-residency at the Fundacion Valparaiso in Mojacar, Spain and for six months in 2009/10 he was the Australian writer-in-residence at the Cité International des Arts in Paris.

== Life ==
Hammial grew up in and around Detroit, Michigan. He attended Olivet College in Olivet, Michigan, then Ohio University in Athens, Ohio where he graduated with honours in English Literature and Philosophy. In 1972, he moved to Australia. He is now an Australian citizen and has been living in the Blue Mountains since 1994. A member of the Woodford Bush Fire Brigade between 1995 and 2003, Hammial fought many of the fires that raged through the Blue Mountains during those years. An environmental and human rights activist, he has worked as a volunteer for the Wilderness Society, the Free Tibet Action Group and is presently active in the XR (Extinction Rebellion) movement.

== Awards ==
- 1988: Rothman's Foundation Poetry Prize
- 2001: Bread, short-listed for the Kenneth Slessor Prize for Poetry
- 2004: In the Year of Our Lord Slaughter's Children, short-listed for the Kenneth Slessor Prize for Poetry
- 2010: Skin Theory, short-listed for the ACT Poetry Prize

== Selected bibliography ==
- 2023 Dervishing, Island Press, Australia
- 2022 Marooned with Pork Jinn, Island Press, Australia
- 2021 Inveigling Snafus, Island Press, Australia
- 2020 Squandering Veronicas, Island Press, Australia
- 2018: Detroit & Selected Poems, Sheep Meadow Press, United States
- 2011: The Beast Should Comply, Flying Island, Macao
- 2009: Skin Theory, Puncher & Wattmann, Australia
- 2005: Swan Song, Picaro Press, Australia
- 2003: In the Year of Our Lord Slaughter's Children, Island Press, Australia
- 2000: Auto One, Vagabond Press, Australia
- 2000: Bread, Black Pepper, Australia
- 1996: Black Market (in The Wild Life), Penguin, Australia
- 1994: With One Skin Less, Hale & Iremonger, Australia
- 1989: Travel/Writing (with Ania Walwicz), Angus & Robertson
- 1988: Pell Mell, Black Lightning Press, Australia
- 1979: Swarm, Island Press, Australia
- 1978: More Bath, Less Water, Red Press, Australia
- 1977: Hear Me Eating, Makar Press, Australia
- 1977: Mastication Poems, The Saturday Centre, Australia
- 1977: Chemical Cart, Island Press, Australia
- 1976: Footfalls & Notes, The Saturday Centre, Australia

== As editor ==
- 2006: 25 poètes australiens, editor, Ecrits des Forges
- 1989: Outsider Art in Australia, co-editor, Aspect
