= Martin Harrison (poet) =

Anglo-Australian poet (1949–2014)

Martin Harrison (1949 – 6 September 2014) was an Anglo-Australian poet.

Born and educated in England, Harrison arrived in Australia in the late 1970s after spending three years in New Zealand. He published poems and limited edition books in London and New Zealand before his first main collection, The Distribution of Voice (University of Queensland Press), appeared in Australia in 1993. In the 1980s Harrison worked as a literary journalist and reviewer as well as a producer for ABC Radio, where he was closely associated with sound art, new music and experimental radio work.

Harrison's 1997 poetry collection The Kangaroo Farm (Paper Bark Press) was shortlisted for the Victorian Premier's Literary Award, and his 2001 collection Summer (Paper Bark Press) won the Wesley Michel Wright Prize in Poetry from the University of Melbourne. A selected poem, Wild Bees (University of Western Australia Press) was shortlisted for both the South Australian Premiers Awards and the Australian Capital Territory (ACT) Poetry Prize.

Harrison wrote extensively about Australian poetry. Some of his essays are collected in the internationally acclaimed volume Who Wants to Create Australia? (Halstead Press). This book was a Times Literary Supplement book of the year selection for 2004.

Harrison's poetry has been translated into Chinese (A Kangaroo Farm trans Shaoyang Zhang, Jiangsu, Nanjing 2008) and into French.

There is a wide range of critical commentary on Harrison's work, principally in Australian and some UK journals. In the main, these views focus either on the detailed micro-perceptual approach to environment and natural phenomena in his work or on the self-reflective, time filled nature of selfhood in his work or they focus, more directly, on the metaphysical nature of many of the poems. British critic David Morley has defined Harrison as the writer of "some of the most brilliant metaphysical nature poems of our time." Michael Farrell, however, considers the subjective side of his work in the preface to the Out of the Box anthology (Puncher and Wattman], Sydney 2009) describing his poetry as about selfhood caught in the process of learning, in which "learning the self and world are in alternation." Nigel Wheale captures a similar sense, reviewing The Kangaroo Farm in the London Review of Books (20:19, 1998), describing the poems as attempts to create "livable locales" and a form of pursuit for places where, in Wheale's words, "ordinary happiness might reside."

On 8 September 2014, Susan Wyndham reported in The Sydney Morning Herald that Martin Harrison had died.

On 1 November 2014, Cordite Poetry Review republished a 1998 interview Harrison did with Sydney poet Adam Aitken, one of five or fewer Harrison interviews known to exist.

== Works ==
- —— (1978). Leisure: Poems (Limited ed.). London: Great Works. Illust. Denise Riley
- —— (1979). Truce: Poems (Limited Letterpress ed.). Wellington: Alan Loney's Hawk Press.
- —— (1980). 1975: Poems (Limited ed.). London: Ferry Press.
- —— (1993). The Distribution of Voice: Poems. St Lucia: University of Queensland Press.
- —— (1997). The Kangaroo Farm. Brooklyn: Paper Bark Press.
- —— (2001). Summer. Sydney: Paper Bark Press.
- —— (2004). Our ABC: A Dying Culture. Strawberry Hills: Currency House.
- —— (2004). Who wants to Create Australia? Essays on Poetry and Ideas in Contemporary Australia. Sydney: Halstead.
- —— (2005). Music: Poems and Prose. Newtown: Vagabond Press.
- —— (2008). Wild Bees: New and Selected Poems. Perth: University of Western Australia Press.
- —— (2008). New and Selected Poems: Wild Bees. Exeter: Shearsman Books.

In translation

- —— (2008). A Kangaroo Farm. Translated by Shaoyang Zhang. Nanjing: Jiang-su Literature and Art Publishing.
