= J. S. Harry =

Australian poet

- Born: Jan S. Harry; 4 January 1939; Adelaide, South Australia, Australia
- Died: 20 May 2015 (aged 76)
- Occupation: Poet
- Writing career
- Notable awards: 1996 New South Wales Premier's Literary Awards — Kenneth Slessor Prize for Poetry, winner; 2008 winner The Age Book of the Year Award — Dinny O'Hearn Poetry Prize, winner

J. S. Harry, or Jan Harry (4 January 1939 – 20 May 2015), was an Australian poet described as "one of Australian poetry’s keenest satirists, political and social commentators, and perhaps its most ethical agent and antagonist."

J. S. Harry was born in South Australia but soon moved to Sydney, where she remained. She worked as an editor for Radio National and held a residency at the Australian National University. A recurrent character in her work was Peter Henry Lepus, a rabbit who name-drops philosophers such as Bertrand Russell, Ludwig Wittgenstein and A. J. Ayer while popping up in the midst of topical events such as the Gulf War. His satirical "clear-eyed vision of the world, and the humans that inhabit it, is that of an Everyrabbit, with its endless simplicity, trepidation, and curiosity."

Among other accolades, J. S. Harry won the Harri Jones Memorial Prize for Poetry, the Poetry Society's Book of the Year, the PEN International Lyne Phillips Poetry Prize and the Kenneth Slessor Prize for Poetry. Her recent works include Not Finding Wittgenstein (2007) a 'collected works' of Peter Henry Lepus and Public Private (2013). Posthumous publication of the last adventure of Peter Henry is anticipated (Giramondo Publishing).

== Works ==
=== Poetry ===
- The Deer Under the Skin (1971)
- Hold for a Little While, and Turn Gently (1979)
- A Dandelion for Van Gogh (1985)
- The Life on the Water and the Life Beneath (Sydney: Angus & Robertson/Paperbark, 1995) ISBN 0-207-18453-4
- Selected Poems (Ringwood, Vic.: Penguin, 1995) ISBN 0-14-058755-1
- Sun Shadow, Moon Shadow (Sydney: Vagabond, 2000) ISBN 0-9578378-1-X
- Not Finding Wittgenstein (Giramondo, 2007) ISBN 978-1-920882-20-4
- Public Private (Sydney: Vagabond, 2013)
- J.S. Harry: New and Selected Poems (Giramondo, 2021) ISBN 978-1-925818-57-4

=== Selected list of poems ===
Title	Year	First published	Reprinted/collected in
"Mousepoem"	1993	Meanjin vol. 52 no. 3, Spring 1993	Selected Poems by J. S. Harry, Penguin, 1995, pp. 22-23
