= Peter Boyle (poet) =

Australian poet and translator (born 1951)

- Born: 1951 (age 74–75) Melbourne, Australia
- Occupation: Poet; translator
- Notable works: Ghostspeaking
- Notable awards: Kenneth Slessor Prize for Poetry (1995), (2017), (2020); Judith Wright Calanthe Prize for Poetry (2010)

Peter Boyle (born 1951) is an Australian poet and translator.

Boyle has published more than a dozen collections of poetry, including The Blue Cloud of Crying and Coming Home From the World. Boyle has also published translations of Federico García Lorca, Luis Cernuda, Eugenio Montejo, César Vallejo, Pierre Reverdy, and others.

== Bibliography ==
- Companions, Ancestors, Inscriptions, Vagabond Press, 2024.https://vagabondpress.net/products/peter-boyle-companions-ancestors-inscriptions
- Ideas of Travel, Vagabond Press, 2022.
- Notes Towards the Dreambook of Endings, Vagabond Press, 2021.
- Enfolded in the Wings of a Great Darkness, Vagabond Press, 2019.
- Ghostspeaking, Vagabond Press, 2016.
- Towns in the Great Desert, Puncher & Wattmann, 2013.
- Apocrypha : Texts Collected and Translated by William O'Shaunessy, Sydney : Vagabond Press, 2010.
- How Does a Man Who Is Dead Reinvent His Body? : The Belated Love Poems of Thean Morris Caelli, Exeter, Devon (County), England : Shearsman Books, 2008.
- The Transformation Boat 2008, River Road Press.
- Reading Borges and Other Poems 2007, Picaro Press.
- Museum of Space, University of Queensland Press, 2004.
- November in Madrid and Other Poems, 2001.
- What the Painter Saw In Our Faces, Five Island Press, 2001.
- The Blue Cloud of Crying, 1997, Hale & Iremonger
- Coming Home From the World, Five Islands Press, 1994.

As translator:

- Carece de causa/No Known Cause by José Kozer, Rialta Ediciones, Mexico, 2020.
- Indole/Of Such A Nature by José Kozer, University of Alabama Press, 2018
- Jasmine for Clementina Médici by Marosa Di Giorgio, Vagabond Press, 2017
- Three poets: Poems by Olga Orozco, Marosa Di Giorgio and Jorge Palma, Vagabond Press, 2017
- Tokonoma by José Kozer, Shearsman Press, 2014.
- Anima by José Kozer. Shearsman, 2011.
- The Trees: Selected Poems by Eugenio Montejo, Salt Publishing, 2004.
- I am going to speak of hope: selected poems by César Vallejo, 1999, Peruvian Consulate Sydney, Southwood Press.

== Awards ==
- Prime Minister's Literary Awards, Poetry, 2025: shortlisted for Companions, Ancestors, Inscriptions
- Adelaide Festival Awards for Literature John Bray Poetry Award, 2022: shortlisted for Notes Towards the Dreambook of Endings
- Queensland Premier's Literary Awards, Judith Wright Calanthe Prize for Poetry, 2020: shortlisted for Enfolded in the Wings of a Great Darkness
- New South Wales Premier's Literary Awards, Kenneth Slessor Prize for Poetry, 2020
- New South Wales Premier's Literary Awards, Kenneth Slessor Prize for Poetry, 2017
- ALS Gold Medal, shortlisted 2017 for Ghostspeaking
- New South Wales Premier's Literary Awards, Translation Prize and PEN Medallion, 2013
- ALS Gold Medal, shortlisted 2010 for Apocrypha
- Queensland Premier's Literary Awards, Arts Queensland, Judith Wright Calantha Prize for Poetry, 2010 for Apocrypha
- Queensland Premier's Literary Awards, Arts Queensland Judith Wright Calanthe Prize for Poetry, 2005: shortlisted for Museum of Space
- New South Wales Premier's Literary Awards, Translation Prize and PEN Medallion, 2004: shortlisted
- Festival Awards for Literature (SA), John Bray Award for Poetry, 1998: winner for The Blue Cloud of Crying
- NBC Banjo Awards, NBC Turnbull Fox Phillips Poetry Prize, 1997: winner for The Blue Cloud of Crying
- New South Wales Premier's Literary Awards, Kenneth Slessor Prize for Poetry, 1995: winner for Coming Home from the World
- NBC Banjo Awards, NBC Turnbull Fox Phillips Poetry Prize, 1995: joint winner for Coming Home from the World
- Wesley Michel Wright Prize for Poetry, 1992: winner for Coming Home from the World
