= Fenton (name) =

Fenton is both a surname and a male given-name, literally-meaning "fen/marsh town", originating as the name of several English places, popular in the United States and New Zealand. It is also a name of Irish-Gaelic origin; Ó Fionnachta (see Finnerty) or Ó Fiachna 'descendant of Fiachna', an old personal name Anglicized as Feighney and sometimes mistranslated as 'Hunt' (see Fee). Notable people with the name include:

== People with the surname ==
=== Actors and actresses ===
- Lavinia Fenton (1708–1760)
- Leonard Fenton (1926–2022)
- Simon Fenton

=== Journalists ===
- Anthony Fenton, Canadian
- Faith Fenton
- Tom Fenton

=== Musicians ===
- Bernie Fenton (1921–2001), British jazz pianist, co-founder of Club Eleven
- Carl Fenton
- George Fenton (1949–2026), English composer
- John William Fenton (died 1890), British bandmaster, associated with the Japanese national anthem
- Julian Fenton (born 1964), English rock musician
- Paul Fenton
- Shane Fenton, singer aka Alvin Stardust

=== Politicians ===
- Bob Fenton (1923–2013), New Zealand politician
- Darien Fenton (born 1954), New Zealand politician
- Donovan Fenton, American politician from New Hampshire
- Ivor D. Fenton (1889–1986), American politician from Pennsylvania
- James Fenton (1864–1950), Australian politician
- Joseph S. Fenton (1781–1851), American politician from Michigan
- Kelly Fenton (born 1966), American politician from Minnesota
- Reuben Fenton (1819–1885), American politician from New York
- William M. Fenton (1808–1871), American politician from Michigan

=== Sportspersons ===
- Billy Fenton
- Darin Fenton, Canadian curler
- Ewan Fenton, Scottish footballer
- Georgia-Mae Fenton (born 2000), British artistic gymnast
- Geraldine Fenton (died 2026), Canadian ice dancer
- Isaac Fenton (1910–1997), English footballer
- John Fenton (hurler)
- Lorraine Fenton
- Nick Fenton
- Paul Fenton (ice hockey), American ice hockey player
- Peggy Fenton (1927–2013), American baseball player
- Rashad Fenton (born 1997), American football player
- Ron Fenton (1940–2013), English footballer and manager
- Ted Fenton

=== Writers ===
- Elijah Fenton (1683–1730), an English poet, biographer and translator.
- Ferrar Fenton (1832-1920), translator of the Bible
- Geoffrey Fenton (c. 1539 – 1608), an English writer
- James Fenton (born 1949), an English poet, journalist and literary critic. He is a former Oxford Professor of Poetry
- James Fenton (1931–2021), Ulster Scots writer and poet.

=== Other ===
- Beatrice Fenton (1887–1983), American sculptor
- Carroll Lane Fenton, American geologist, paleontologist, author
- Clyde Fenton, flying doctor
- David Fenton, founder of Fenton Communications
- Edward Fenton (died 1603), navigator
- Frank Fenton (disambiguation)
- Geoffrey Fenton (c. 1539–1608), English writer, Privy Councillor, and Principal Secretary of State in Ireland
- Gwen Fenton, Australian Antarctic scientist
- H. J. H. Fenton, chemical engineer
- John Charles Fenton, lawyer
- Joseph Fenton, informer killed by the Provisional Irish Republican Army
- Joseph Clifford Fenton, editor of American Ecclesiastical Review (1944–66)
- Mildred Adams Fenton, American geologist, palaeontologist, author
- Myles Fenton (1830–1918), British manager of railway companies
- Prudence Fenton, producer
- Richard Fenton, Welsh topographer, poet and writer
- Roger Fenton, photographer
- Steve Fenton, footballer
- Steve Fenton, rugby league player
- Suzanne Fenton, American biologist
- Ted Fenton, manager of West Ham United
- Wayne Fenton (1953–2006), American psychiatrist, researcher with National Institute of Mental Health
- William N. Fenton (1908–2005), American anthropologist, academic, and author

== People with the given name ==
- Fenton Johnson (poet) (1888–1958), American poet, essayist, author of short stories, editor and educator
- Fenton Keogh, celebrity chef
- Fenton Robinson, blues musician
- Fenton Williams, lighting designer, founder of Filament Productions
- Fenton Bailey, filmmaker and television producer

== Fictional characters ==
- Fenton, a 'young gentleman' in Shakespeare's The Merry Wives of Windsor
- Harry Fenton, in the television series Peaky Blinders
- Lord Fenton, in the novel Scarlett
- Fenton Crackshell, aka GizmoDuck from DuckTales
- Fenton, the Death Sheep from Hell, the subject of the song "Sheep Marketing Ploy" by Tom Smith
- Fenton Mewley, from the animated television series Home Movies
- Fenton Hardy from the Hardy Boys books
- Fenton O'Connell, an alias of Kevin Ryan in the television series Castle
- Fenton Meiks, in the film Frailty
- Fenton, a minor character who has a feud with Fez in the television series That '70s Show
- Daniel Fenton, a main character of the animated television series Danny Phantom

== See also ==
- Fenton (disambiguation)
