= Zemiro =

Zemiro is a surname. Notable people with the surname include:

- Jane Zemiro (born 1939), Australian academic and writer
- Julia Zemiro (born 1967), French-born Australian television presenter, radio host, actress, singer, writer and comedian

== See also ==
- Zohar Zimro (born 1977), Israeli long-distance runner known as Zemiro
