= Fenton =

Fenton or Fentons may refer to:

== Places ==
=== Australia ===
- Fentons Creek, Victoria

=== Canada ===
- Fenton, Saskatchewan

=== United Kingdom ===
- Fenton, Cambridgeshire, with neighbouring Pidley, part of the parish of Pidley cum Fenton
- Fenton, Cumbria
- Fenton, South Kesteven, Lincolnshire
- Fenton, West Lindsey, Lincolnshire
- Fenton, Nottinghamshire
- Fenton, Staffordshire (Stoke-on-Trent)
- Fenton Tower, East Lothian, Scotland

=== United States ===
- Fenton, Iowa
- Fenton, Kentucky
- Fenton, Louisiana
- Fenton, Michigan
- Fenton, Missouri
- Fenton, New York
- Fenton Township, Whiteside County, Illinois
- Fenton Township, Michigan
- Fenton Township, Minnesota

== People and fictional characters ==
- Fenton (name), including lists of people and fictional characters with the surname or given name
- Clan Fenton, a Scottish clan

== Businesses ==
- Fenton Art Glass Company, an American glass manufacturer
- Fenton Communications, an American public relations firm
- Fentons Creamery, an American ice cream parlor and restaurant

== See also ==
- Fenton's reagent
- Fenton (dog), a dog in the viral YouTube video Jesus Christ in Richmond Park
