= Nicole Webster =

Australian marine scientist

Nicole Webster (born 1973 in Ormskirk, UK) is an Australian marine scientist who is the Executive Director for the Institute of Marine and Antarctic Studies at the University of Tasmania.

== Education ==
Nicole Webster obtained an undergraduate degree and PhD in marine biology at James Cook University. Webster's research discovered that sponge-microbial associations are fairly uniform throughout large geographic zones and highlighted the specificity of this partnership. She also discovered that the breakdown of this symbiosis may be a good indicator of environmental stress.

== Career ==
Webster conducted postdoctoral research in Antarctica through the University of Canterbury and Gateway Antarctica. Her research analyzed how microbe symbiosis can be biologically indicative of environmental strain in Antarctic marine ecosystems and also examined how microorganisms trigger the settlement and metamorphosis of coral reef invertebrates.

Webster became a research scientist at the Australian Institute for Marine Science (AIMS) and Principal Research Fellow at the Australian Centre for Ecogenomics located at the University of Queensland. In 2024, she is an Honorary Professor at UQ in the School of Chemistry and Molecular Biosciences.

In 2021, Webster was appointed Chief Scientist for the Australian Antarctic Division, succeeding Gwen Fenton. As such, she took part in the 2022 Australian Antarctic Division Science Symposium in Canberra, speaking on climate science, the Southern Ocean and new technology, as well as the 2023 New Zealand/ Australia Antarctic Science Conference in Christchurch, where she spoke on joint research. She also oversaw two drilling operations in the Antarctic plateau.

In 2024, she was ranked as the number one Australian Antarctic Division scientist.

In January 2024, she was appointed as Executive Director for the Institute for Marine and Antarctic Studies at the University of Tasmania. She is also part of the committee for the Centre for Marine Socioecology in Hobart.

== Awards ==
- 2010 Dorothy Hill Medal
- 2025 Fellow of the Australian Academy of Science
