= Fenson =

Fenson is a surname. Notable people with the surname include:

- Eric Fenson (born 1971), American curler
- Pete Fenson (born 1968), American curler, brother of Eric
- Ricky Fenson (born 1945), British rock bass guitarist

== See also ==
- FenCon
- Fenton (name)
