= Peter Fenton =

Peter Fenton may refer to:

- Peter Fenton (politician) (1886–1953), Canadian politician
- Peter Fenton (venture capitalist) (born 1972), Silicon Valley venture capitalist
- Peter Fenton, Australian actor and musician, was member of Crow
- Peter Fenton, (1957) English guitarist of Siouxsie and the Banshees

== See also ==
- Fenton (name)
