= Steve Fenton =

Steve Fenton may refer to:

- Steve Fenton (footballer) (born 1951), English former professional footballer
- Steve Fenton (rugby league), English rugby league footballer who played in the 1970s and 1980s
