= Great BBQ Challenge =

Australian TV show

- Starring: Hosts; Jabba; Judges; Ben O'Donoghue; Julia Zemiro; Mark Adamson
- Country of origin: Australia

Production
- Running time: Heats; 60 minutes Semi-finals; 30 minutes

Original release
- Network: Lifestyle FOOD
- Release: 2 December 2006 – 26 January 2007

Australia's Great BBQ Challenge is a reality TV show on the Lifestyle FOOD Channel. The show is a competition to find Australia's best BBQ Chef and is hosted by Jabba and was first aired 2 December 2006. The winner ( Fenton KEOGH ) received$25,000 (AUD) and hosted his own cooking show that aired on Lifestyle FOOD and a Grand Turbo 6 BBQ Burner Worth $5,000.

== About ==
Throughout the contest the Top 21 Finalists were given challenges to test their presenting skills, to see if they have what it takes to host their own show on Lifestyle FOOD. The shows' judges are Ben O'Donoghue, Julia Zemiro and Mark Adamson. Celebrity chef, Ben O'Donoghue (of Surfing the Menu), gives the contestants tips on cooking technique, seasoning, time management and presentation. Comedian, radio personality and actress Julia Zemiro is there to judge the "X Factor". She profiles the finalists personalities and gives them advice on how to best use their own individual strengths as they would hosting a show. Television director and producer Mark Adamson is seeking out those contestants who light up the screen and connect with the audience. He is there to judge their performance and showmanship. Adamson also coaches the finalists through a variety of screen tests and direction using in-ear communication devices. An example included asking the contestants to pull a random object out of a barrel, and "sell" the item to the audience for 30 seconds. This tested their off-the-cuff ability under pressure of live or scripted television.

=== Auditions ===
Auditions were held in many locations around Australia. Sydney, Melbourne, Brisbane, Adelaide, Hobart, Perth, the Gold Coast, Darwin and remote locations such as Dubbo, Townsville and Ballarat. Contestants were asked to cook one sausage and one egg whilst answering a series of questions about themselves and why they wanted to be part of the show. A second part of the process was a screen test where they had to talk more about what they would do if they had their own show and deliver a tagline or marketing slogan that summarises their personality and character.

=== Contestants ===
The Top 21

After thousands auditioned from all over Australia, 21 finalists were selected to battle it out in the heats. The top 21 finalists of 2006 were.

Amelita

Andrew

Barbara & Jayne (team)

Bonabent (Bona)

David

Fenton

Gabrielle

George

Hayley

Ivan

Jason

Katie

Laz

Lisette

Margaret

Richard and Kathy (team)

Rita

Sandy

Sophie

Tibor

William (Bill)

The 21 contestants were put through their paces in a series of 7 heats with different themes. They had to firstly cook their signature dish, then perform a screen test, then battle it out to produce the best dish from a secret ingredient. Judges Mark, Julia and Ben then decided on the winner based on how they performed in each challenge and their overall performance including charisma, personality and verbal ability.

=== Heats ===
Heat 1 - Beach Party

Each contestant got 15 minutes to cook their own signature dish. Bill cooked North African marinated lamb. Barbara and Jayne cooked a steak and mushroom ragù and Andrew made turkey burgers. Andrew lost points in the final cook off for cutting into the meat while still on the grill. In the final round it was Bill who came out on top though his simple surf and turf dish was under seasoned.

Heat 2 - Asian Bazaar

Margaret, Rita and Bona battled it out in an Asian themed heat. Mags' signature dish was called Chicken a'la Mags, a chicken and vegetable feast with coconut cream and Asian flavours. Rita's dish was marinated lamb cutlets with Italian influences. Bona pulled out the big guns with his tender loin steak and tropical BBQ sauce. It was a concern of Mark's that Bona might frighten young children if he was to host a show. Even though Mags struggled with the screen test and has no formal cooking training, she was declared the winner of heat 2 and Rita was granted a wild card.

Heat 3 - Bush Tucker

By the third round things started to get interesting. Amelita, David and Hayley took up the challenge in the Australian-themed episode. Amelita's signature dish was an organic rib fillet with shaved ham, banana, and hollandaise sauce. Ben's comments were 'You eat with your eyes and that is beating me to death!' Amelita fired back saying 'Your shoes are beating me to death.' It did her no favours. David cooked up a delightful black sesame seed-crusted tuna which was favoured among the judges. Hayley's simple salmon on potato rösti was elegant and delighted the judges who commented on her presentation in particular the height. Despite her good looks and clever articulation it was David who was chosen to go through to the semi-finals.

Heat 4 - Aussie Christmas

Tibor, Jason and Gabrielle battled it out for an Aussie Christmas episode which set a new standard so far in the show. Gold Coast chef/teacher Jason struggled with his signature dish round with his Cafe Del Mare (seafood platter For 2) which he served cold after cooking it too early. Gabs impressed the two male judges with an old favourite, aussie burgers minus the beetroot, and Tibor went over the top with a Jurassic feast of ostrich, barbecued pears with spiced honey, walnuts and blue cheese. The secret ingredient this week was turkey, and while Jason professed his loathe for the bird, he was the only contestant able to cook it properly. Mark, Julia and Ben refused to eat Tibor's and Gabrielle's turkey (as it was medium rare) and declared Jason the winner, although Mark thought he was not the best on the day, preferring Gabrielle as a choice. Clearly Jason's food was presented well and his technique was polished thus the judges wanted to see more and gave him the chance to do so as he was put through to the semi-finals.

Heat 5 - Seafood Safari

The seafood safari episode saw many firsts for the Great BBQ Challenge. The first dessert to be cooked entirely on the BBQ, the first entree and the first tears of the series. Restaurateur Fenton shocked the judges with his signature dish, the great Aussie pavlova with boozy summer fruits. Darwin cook Lisette served up antipasto and Perth IT professional Laz had all the right flavours with his stir fry vegetables and lamb chops. During the screen test Fenton's explosive nature impressed Mark and Julia while Laz came out on top with his clear delivery and knowledge base. The final challenge was to cook up a seafood feast. Laz's cook in the bag technique came under criticism from Ben as he didn't clean the flat plate between courses and mixed his meal with the charred remains of the previous dish. Fenton's Moreton Bay bugs prepared with Asian flavours, secured the win from the judges and moved him to tears and into the semi-finals.

Heat 6 - Kids Feast

This episode saw the Challenge's youngest competitor Sandy, go up against food writer Katie and Ivan the posty. The signature dish round began the first round. Ivan prepared a unique combination of flavours with his rabbit thighs with mint pineapple. Sandy's spicy lamb served on a char grilled vegetable stack proved to the judges she was very accomplished behind the grill, despite her age. Katie from Brisbane went for a cheaper option and whipped up some steak fajitas. Mark's screen test round belonged to Ivan whose theatrical training helped put him clearly in front of the competition. In the final round the kiddies were the judges and Ivan was declared the winner and Katie was given a second chance as a wild card.

Heat 7 - Retro Pool Party

Sophie and George went up against duo Richard and Kathy in the final round of the heats and with 2 places still remaining in the semi's this was set to be a showdown. Blonde bombshell Sophie from Melbourne pulled off a family favourite Sunday roast on the barbie. The second team to make the top 21, Richard and Kathy decided on some sand whiting fillets with fennel scallops. Thinking seafood as well, George impressed with salmon and beurre rouge (red butter). Richard and Kathy lost their way in the mystery object challenge, failing to connect with the camera but earned themselves the wild card slot while Sophie took out the heat hands down.

=== Semi-finals ===
The Semi-finals saw the top 10 contestants (7 winners of the heats and 3 wildcards) go at it one on one, with a set of cooking challenges all centred on different themes.

Semi final 1 - Breakfast

The Breakfast challenge brought qualified chefs Jason and Fenton together to produce a breakfast feast in 30 minutes. At least three different breakfast items had to be prepared all on the BBQ. One with flour, one without flour and one with fruit. Ben through a curve ball halfway through the challenge and expected a poached egg from each challenger. Fenton went all out and attempted a damper similar to a filet mignon wrapped in bacon. Coconut hotcakes with balsamic glazed fruit and a chipolata rolled in an egg net. Jason's plate was also distinguished, although his egg turned out brown due to the new wok and acidic lime juice. Jason's food was presented best but it was Fenton's big personality that won over the judges and earned a place in the top 10.

Winner - Fenton

Wildcard - Jason

Semi final 2 - Canapes

The two ladies from the home kitchen, Katie and Rita go at it in the canapes challenge.

Winner - Katie

Runner-up - Rita

Semi final 3 - Fish

Ivan the postman took on Ballarat's gift of gab Mags in the third semi - the fish challenge. Despite them both not having trained in a professional kitchen this showdown was all systems go from the beginning.

Winner - Ivan

Runner-up - Margaret

Semi final 4 - Smoking

It was two against one in the fourth semi where David took on Richard and Kathy the final team left.

Winner - David

Runner-up - Richard & Kathy

Semi final 5 - Burger

Jabba said it best when he said 'we've saved the best for last' in the final semi where the two youngest finalists went head to head in the burger challenge.

Winner - Sophie

Wildcard - William (Bill)

=== Finalists ===
5 finalists plus 2 wildcards were put through a series of different challenges to determine who would make it through to the grand finale.

The Survivor Challenge

The Contestants were put through their paces in a Boot Camp cook-off. The wild card contestants, Bill and Jason, were designated team leaders and asked to split the finalists into 2 teams (red and blue). They proceeded through physical challenges that showcased their communication, teamwork and problem-solving skills. The final task would be a cook off with the ingredients determined at the end of each round. If they won a challenge they were able to have first pick of the ingredients including meat or vegetables. The final team challenge was to start a fire from scratch. The contestants (in their teams) then had to cook a 4 course meal and damper on their camp-fires to impress the judges and feed the commandos who led them through the challenges. The winning team (blue) consisted of Fenton, Sophie, Bill and David. They defeated Ivan, Katie and Jason of the red team. The winning team was then put in the awkward position to choose one contestant from the losing team to eliminate and they had to name that person within 30 seconds. They chose to eliminate the strongest competitor.

Jason was eliminated.

Sausage Sizzle Challenge

For this challenge teams were altered due to blue now having 4 members and red being left with 2 after Jason's departure. Ivan and Katie chose Fenton to join their team and even the stakes. Next the teams were taken to a sausage kitchen. They then made their own sausage meat and ground it up into one long sausage that had to be rolled into normal sized sausages. Ivan was quite adapt at creating objects out of balloons so he was named the 'balloon man' for the challenge and helped the red team make over 400 sausages and win the round. New red team member Fenton was given the nickname 'bacon' as he had the reputation of 'bringing home the bacon.' The next part to the challenge was to construct a BBQ straight out of a flat-pack box. The blue team came out on top this time. Once assembled, the two teams then had to cook the sausages they had made for children (and their parents) from the local athletics club, who were now cheering the teams on. Each sausage had to be served with a different condiment. Then as part of the presenting aspect of the show, the teams were each given a megaphone which they used to try to persuade the kids to try their sausages over the other teams. It seemed like an out of control bidding war and while Katie and Bill did well at the task, Fenton didn't even need a microphone. In the end the judges differed in their opinions of who won. Ben believed the red team made the better sausage sizzle while Mark thought blue had it in the bag. Blue were selected as the winners and two from the red team were sent home.

Ivan and Katie were eliminated.

Teppanyaki Challenge

This challenge was an early start for the 4 remaining finalists Bill, Sophie, Fenton and David. It began at the fish markets in Sydney's Chinatown where Ben explained the art of finding a fresh fish. Each finalist asked around to find out as much information as they could about a fish they had never cooked before. Fenton was so impressed with the filleting of the salmon that he wanted to meet the man responsible. Turned out it was the No. 1 salmon filleter in NSW. At the docks, 4 BBQ's were set up and each contestant was given 60 seconds to look down the barrel of the camera and talk about how they would prepare this fish, as though they were hosting a show. This was a test to see how much of the information they could retain and deliver to an audience in a simple to understand language. A Teppanyaki Chef came out and gave the finalists a crash course in the ancient Japanese technique. For the final challenge the remaining 4 were taken to a Teppanyaki restaurant and asked to cook a meal for the judges using the technique. Each contestant was judged on the ability to talk and cook at the same time while using techniques that they were all unfamiliar with. The judges then decided they would send one home who they thought was 'throwing' the contest.

David was eliminated.

Top Notch Grill Challenge

The Top 3, Sophie, Bill, and Fenton had two final challenges to complete. The first was the last chance to work on their presenting skills with Mark and Julia. Mark held a Cue card which they were required to read while looking down the camera and deliver it with as much personality as possible, to engage the audience. Bill and Sophie struggled with their delivery while Fenton got a round of applause from both judges. In the second challenge, at one of Sydney's fine dining experiences, Mint bar and dining, the contestants had to impress 5 VIP's with a signature dish under the head chef, Ben O'Donoghue. Sophie served a Mexican chicken dish with a salad including heart of palm and pistachio, which impressed the judges. Next, Bill served a crayfish cooked in herb butter and with a salad, which the judges agreed the presentation was lacking and the salad didn't suit the dish. Lastly, Fenton from Queensland served up a ribeye fillet with hollandaise and potato rösti (a popular dish at his restaurant). While one judge liked Fenton's dish, a majority of the judges voted on Sophie's dish, so she went through to the grand finale. In second place, Fenton went through as well to the grand finale. In the final twist in the episode, Chef Ben decided to bring Bill back because he "felt that he had let him down with his direction in the kitchen." All 3 contestants ended up going into the final with the winner announced on Australia Day.

=== Finale ===
On 26 January (Australia Day) the winner of the Great BBQ Challenge was decided by SMS voting. Fenton Keogh received the most votes and was crowned Australia's best BBQ'er. His passion, enthusiasm and willingness to share his emotions during the series, captured the hearts of the nation who selected him as the overall winner by 1%. The 35-year-old chef won $25,000, his own show on Lifestyle FOOD as well as the Grand Turbo 6 Burner BBQ from Barbecues galore worth over $5,000.

== See also ==
- List of Australian television series
- List of cooking shows
- Barbecue in Australia
