= Fenton, Cumbria =

Village in Cumbria, England

Coordinates: 54.896°N 2.778°W

Fenton
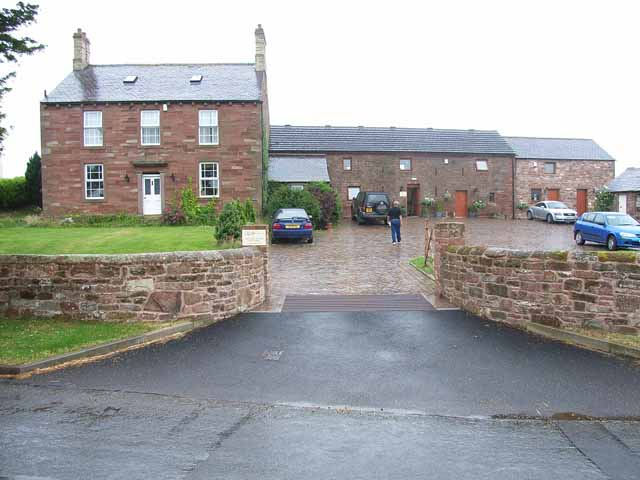
- Yew Tree Farm, Fenton

- Location in the former Carlisle district, Cumbria Location within Cumbria
- OS grid reference: NY501560
- Civil parish: Hayton
- Unitary authority: Cumberland
- Ceremonial county: Cumbria
- Region: North West
- Country: England
- Sovereign state: United Kingdom
- Post town: BRAMPTON
- Postcode district: CA8
- Dialling code: 01228
- Police: Cumbria
- Fire: Cumbria
- Ambulance: North West
- UK Parliament: Carlisle

Fenton is a village in the civil parish of Hayton, in the Cumberland district, in the ceremonial county of Cumbria. It is near the small town of Brampton. The name "Fenton" means "settlement by a fen". The village is one of the possible sources of the surnames Fenton and Fentem.
