= Yukon Field Force =

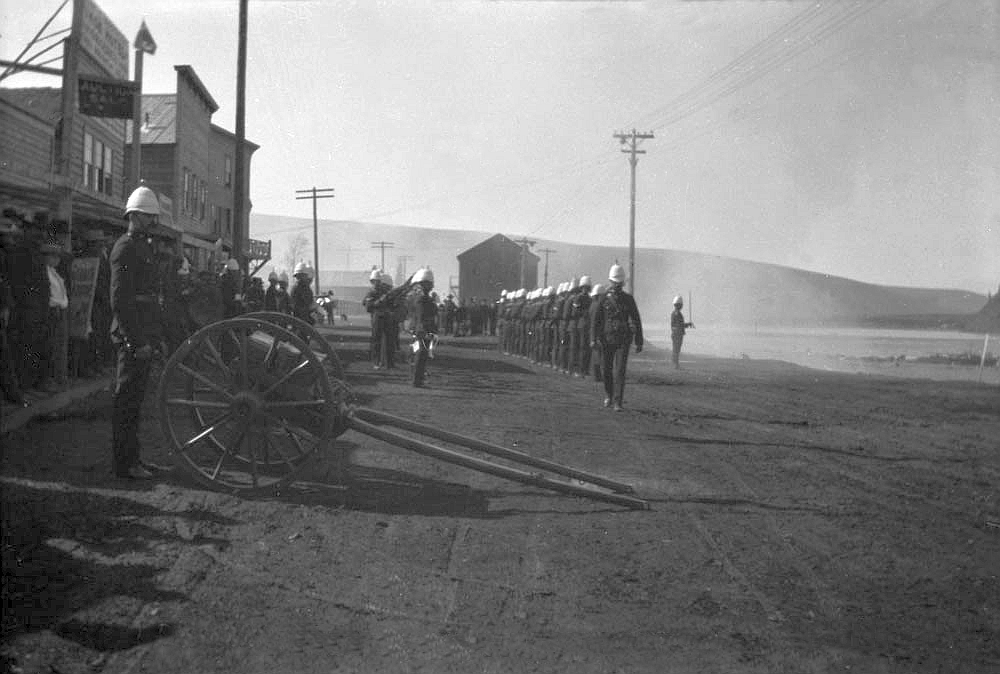
- The force on parade in Dawson City, 1900
- Active: 6 May 1898–June 1900
- Country: Canada
- Branch: Permanent Force of the Canadian Militia
- Type: Field Force
- Role: Garrison
- Size: 203

The Yukon Field Force, later termed the Yukon Garrison, was a unit of 203 officers and men from the Permanent Force of the Canadian Militia that served in the Yukon between 1898 and 1900. The force was created in the wake of the Klondike Gold Rush in response to fears that the United States might attempt to seize the region. It left Ottawa on May 6, 1898, travelling by rail and sea to the port of Glenora in British Columbia. From there, the unit made an arduous journey of 890 kilometres (550 mi) on foot and using makeshift boats to Fort Selkirk, where they established their headquarters. A detachment of 72 men was sent to the boom town of Dawson City to support the North-West Mounted Police, with duties that included guarding the gold deposits of the local banks. As the fears of an annexation reduced, pressures grew for the recall of the force. The force was halved in size in July 1898 and the remainder were finally withdrawn in June 1900.

== Background ==
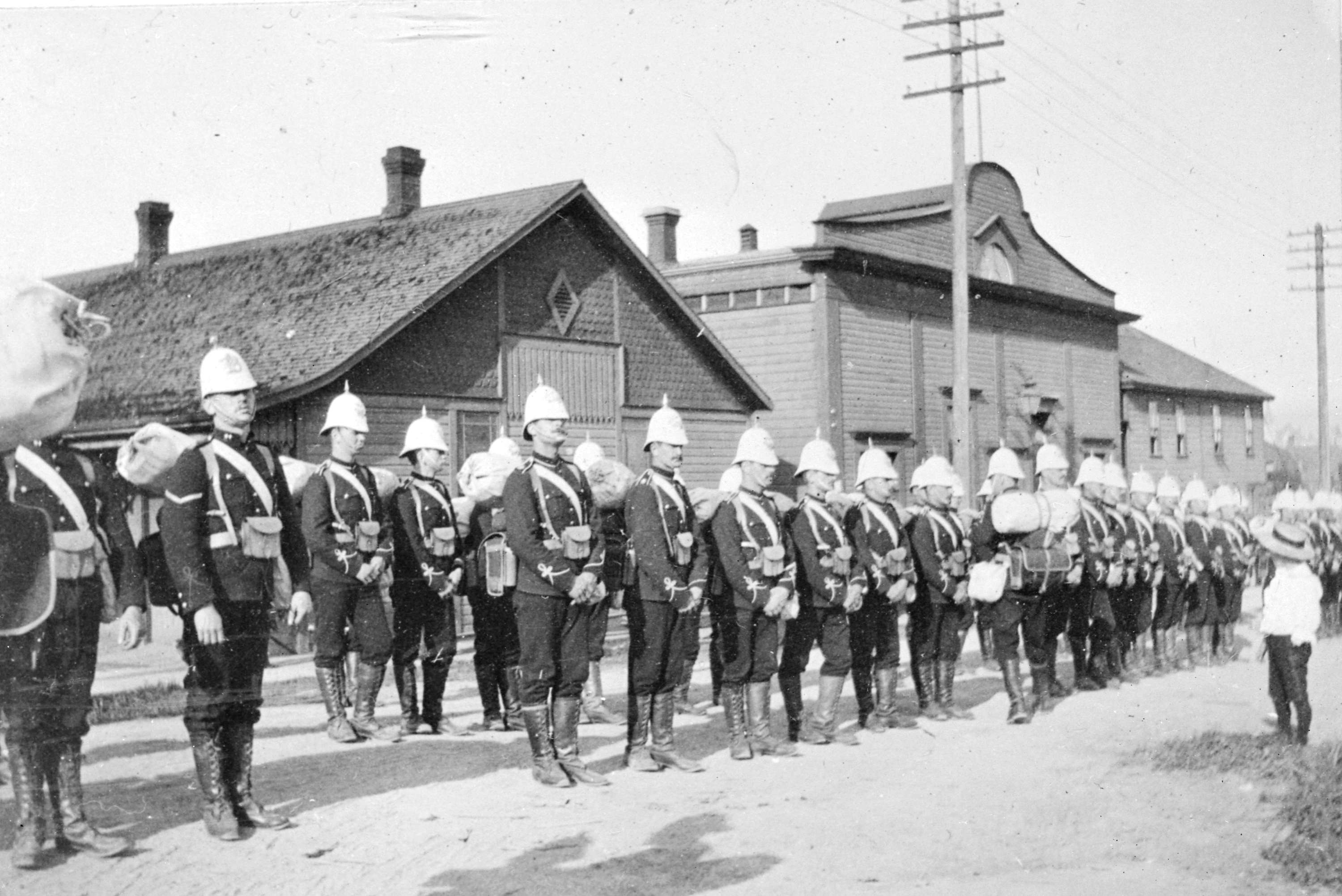
The force parading en route to the Yukon in Vancouver, 1898

The Yukon Field Force was created in response to the discovery of gold in the Canadian far north in the final years of the 19th century. There was no government presence in the Yukon in the late 19th century and the region was sparsely populated by First Nations and European prospectors. The borders in south-east Alaska had been disputed between the United States, Canada and Britain since the United States' purchase of Alaska from Russia in 1867. There were no police in the region, and the Permanent Force of the Canadian Militia was only around 800 strong across the whole of the country, with the nearest garrison in Winnipeg, Manitoba, approximately 3,800 kilometres (2,400 mi) away.

Gold began to be discovered along the valleys, however, and by 1894 the growing population and development of gold mining at Forty Mile had led to calls from religious and business leaders for Ottawa to intervene to control whiskey trading, protect the local First Nations and gather customs duties. The government surveyor William Ogilvie warned Ottawa that it was necessary to introduce Canadian government quickly to the region if a United States takeover was to be avoided. In response, the North-West Mounted Police carried out a survey along the Yukon River, establishing a barracks there in 1875.

In 1896, huge amounts of gold were discovered in the Klondike valley, prompting an international gold rush. Local miners streamed from Forty Mile to the new town of Dawson and, once word got out to the wider world the next year, around 100,000 more rushed to the region in search of gold. (Note: The initial broad estimates of the numbers involved in the gold rush were produced by Pierre Berton, drawing on a number of sources, including the North-West Mounted Police statistics generated along the trails. The most recent academic work continues to accept these estimates, but further detailed analysis has been carried out, using the first, limited Yukon census by the mounted police that occurred in 1898 and the more detailed Federal census in 1901. The historian Charlene Porsild has conducted extensive work on these records, comparing them to other documentary accounts of the period. This has generated improved statistics for the nationality and gender of those involved in the gold rush.) Although no more than 40,000 successfully reached the Klondike, an estimated 60 to 80 percent of these newcomers came from the United States. (Note: Traditional historical analysis, as outlined by George Fetherling, has suggested around 80 percent were United States citizens or recent immigrants to the country. The 1898 census data suggests that 63 percent of Dawson City inhabitants at the time were American citizens, with 32 percent Canadian or British. As the historian Charlene Porsild has described, however, the census data for the period is inconsistent in how it asked questions about citizenship and place of birth. Porsild argues that the level of participation from those born in the United States, as opposed to recent immigrants or temporary residents, may have been as low as 43 percent, with Canadian and British born members of the gold rush in the majority.) The mounted police deployed to the region in increasing strength, in part due to concerns that the United States might take the opportunity to annex the Klondike.

== Mobilisation ==
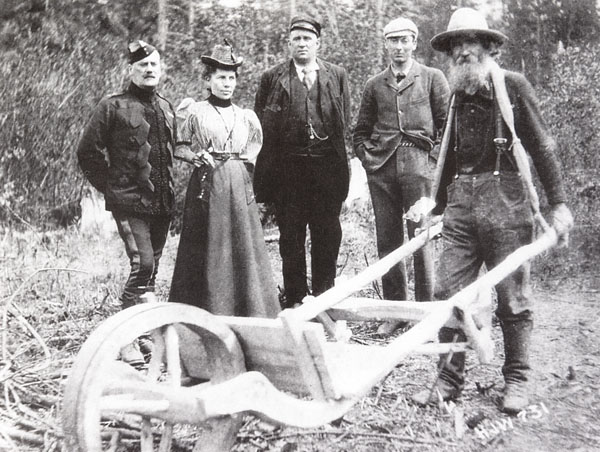
Near Glenora, 1898; (left to right), Captain Gardiner, Yukon Field Force; Faith Fenton; Captain Bill Robinson of the Stikine Chief; unidentified man; prospector

The first suggestion that a military force should be sent to the Yukon came from Nathaniel Wallace, who put forward the idea in Parliament in February 1898. The government worked up the proposal into a formal plan, which was confirmed through an Order-in-Council on March 21. Frederick Borden, the Minister of Militia and Defence, announced in May that a 200-strong force would be deployed to Fort Selkirk, the nominal capital of the territory, to reinforce the mounted police. One of the arguments put forward in favour of this option was that it was much cheaper than sending additional police, who enjoyed higher pay than soldiers. In addition to its primary role in maintaining Canadian sovereignty, Borden stated that the force would, if necessary, assist in maintaining law and order.

The 203-strong force consisted of 12 commissioned officers, 15 men from the Royal Canadian Dragoons, 46 men from the Royal Canadian Artillery and 130 men from the Royal Regiment of Canadian Infantry. The force was formed up by asking for volunteers from the Permanent Force, who were told that the task would last at least two years; the detachment proved popular, with many soldiers putting themselves forward for it and, if necessary, extending their terms of service. It was commanded by acting Lieutenant-Colonel Thomas Evans, a well-regarded officer based in Winnipeg, who had a background in managing cavalry, infantry and artillery.

The force was equipped with Lee–Enfield rifles, two Maxim guns, and two 7-pounder (3 kg) guns, one brass and the other steel, and took along sixty horses for transport. The soldiers were issued with special heavy black pea jackets and trousers and other cold weather clothing for the winter months, along with their regular field and garrison uniforms. Their hastily purchased supplies included 123,000 kilograms (271,000 lb) of tinned meat, biscuits and flour. The soldiers were accompanied by nine "artificers" – including boat builders and packers – and eleven civil servants. The expedition was also joined by four nurses, dispatched by the Victorian Order of Nurses to work in the Yukon; the wife of a mounted police officer who was travelling to join her husband; and Faith Fenton, a journalist sent by the Toronto Globe to cover the force's journey.

== Deployment ==
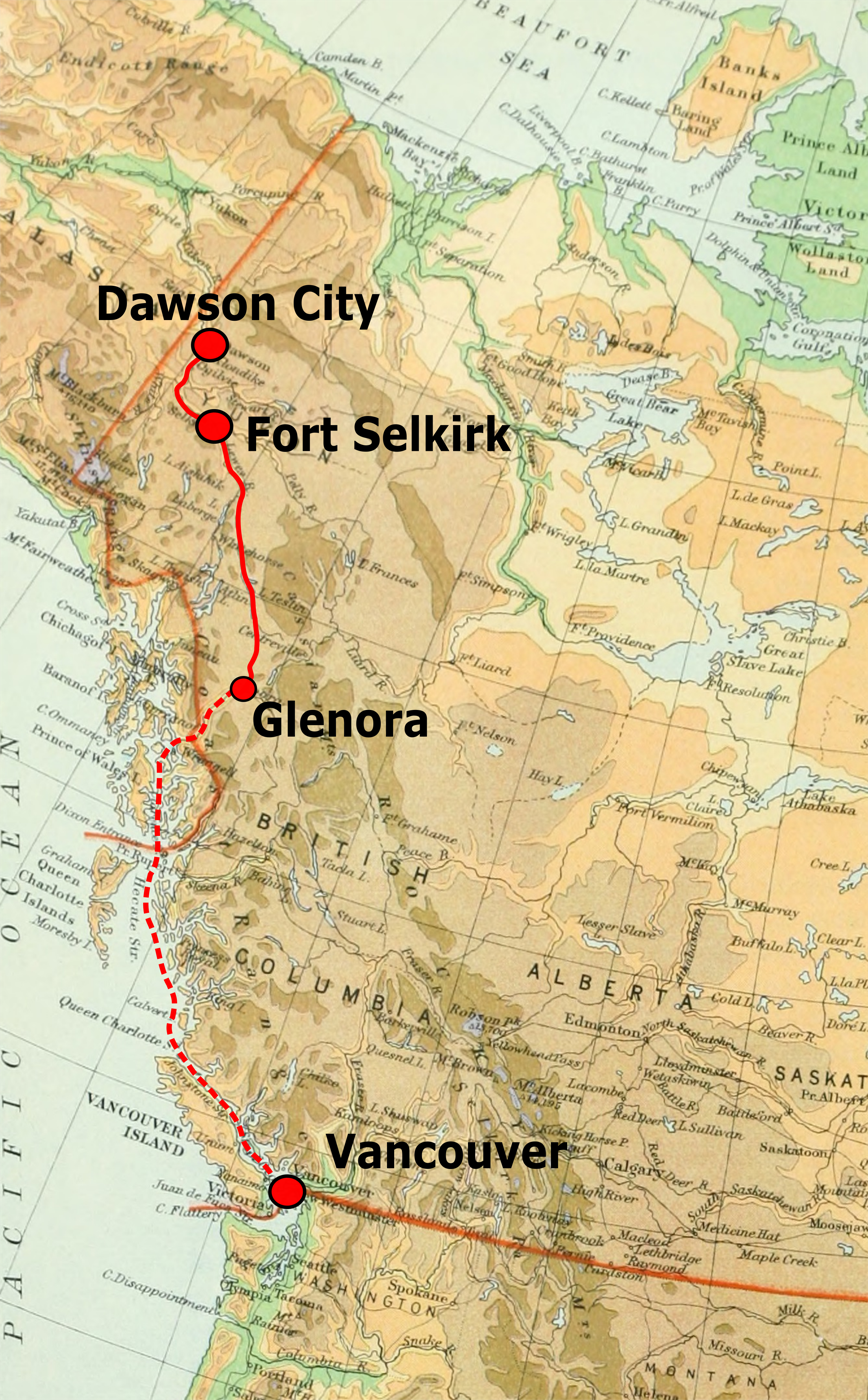
Map showing the deployment of the force from Vancouver in 1898

By 1898, there were various ways to reach the remote Yukon region from eastern Canada, but most required that travellers passed through some United States territory along the way, either when coming by boat across western Alaska along the Yukon River, or when crossing the mountain ranges in the south-east. This situation had aroused nationalistic concern in Canada and some routes had therefore been identified that avoided entering the United States altogether, known as the "All-Canadian routes". It was regarded as politically essential that the Yukon Field Force use one of these, and this was reinforced by practical concerns that the slower Yukon River route might take the expedition too long to complete, potentially stranding the force in the wilderness if its waters froze early.

After leaving by rail from Ottawa on May 6 bound for Vancouver, the force was therefore split into two. The men and 80 metric tons (79 long tons; 88 short tons) of essential supplies would travel to the river head at Wrangell, then up the Stikine River on the Stikine Chief, making use of Canada's navigational rights and avoiding landing in United States territory, before travelling overland and along the river network towards Fort Selkirk. The remaining 100 metric tons (98 long tons; 110 short tons) of the supplies and the artillery would be sent via St Michael in Alaska and from there by steamer through to Dawson City.

Having landed at the port of Glenora in British Columbia on May 20, the main force marched overland to Telegraph Creek, where the 250-kilometre (160 mi) long Teslin Trail began. The force was broken down into 35-man teams for the march, with an advance party of 50 men sent on ahead to improve the trail and advance quickly using a steamer on to Fort Selkirk to begin rebuilding it. The journey over the rugged terrain was arduous, and Thomas Evans noted the suffering caused by the heat, swamps and mosquitos, observing that his men had nothing to eat but "hard biscuits, rancid strong bacon and black tea". They each carried heavy packs, as the local contractors had failed to supply them with sufficient mules to transport their supplies.

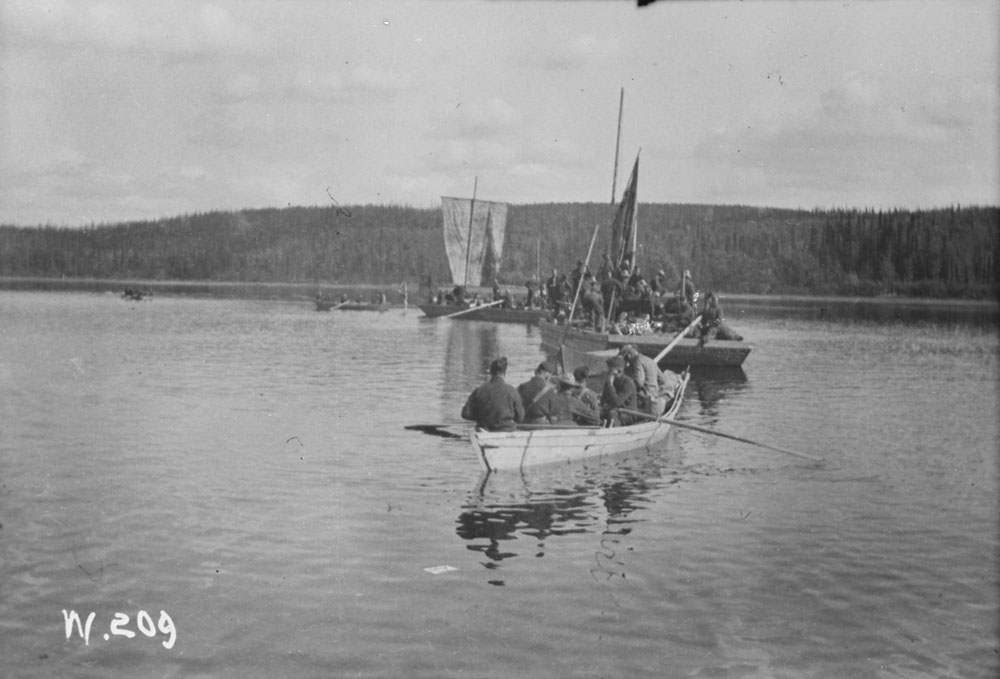
The force crossing Teslin Lake in improvised scows and row boats, 1898

When the force reached the end of the trail at Teslin Lake, Evans left aboard a steamer with a detachment of 80 men to join the team at Fort Selkirk, but the boat hit a rock while coming back to pick up the remainder of the men. The force instead sailed across the lake using four scows and five smaller row boats they had built from local trees, having originally intended to use them to carry their supplies. The scows were 14 metres (46 ft) long and could carry 15 metric tons (15 long tons; 17 short tons) of cargo and 30 men; they had sails, and were fitted with a stove for cooking. They finally arrived in Fort Selkirk on September 11, having covered another 640 kilometres (400 mi) from Teslin Lake.

A small detachment of mounted police were already stationed at Fort Selkirk to monitor the river traffic, and the advance team of the force had been working with contractors to make good progress on the new garrison buildings. The combined force completed the work, creating a compound of eleven log buildings around a central parade ground.

== Duties in the Yukon ==
Although the headquarters of the force remained at Fort Selkirk, over the course of October and November 1898, 72 men and one of the Maxim guns were sent to Dawson City to support the mounted police. The Dawson detachment protected the gold held by the various banks in the town, guarded prisoners, helped to construct local hospitals, and took part in fighting fires – the town was built from wood and particularly vulnerable to conflagration. They also carried out some ceremonial duties. The Fort Selkirk garrison was considered to be quite isolated and men were moved between the two sites over the winter to reduce the boredom. During the warmer months of 1899, weekly military exercises were carried out by the force and a rifle range was constructed.

== Withdrawal ==
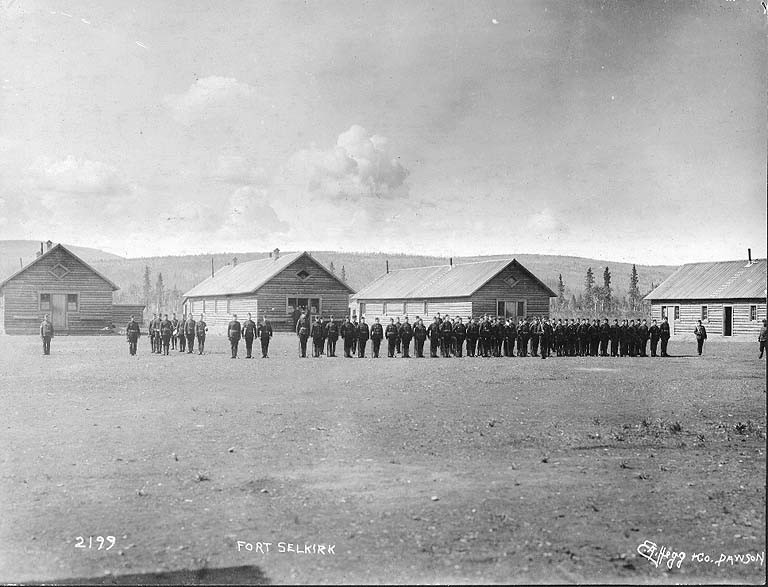
Military drills at Fort Selkirk, 1898

By 1899, the risk of annexation had passed and General Edward Hutton, the new General Officer Commanding Canadian Militia, was unhappy with the role of the Yukon Field Force. He argued that it was inappropriately employed in support of civil tasks, and that having so many regular soldiers deployed there was harming the Permanent Force's ability to train the rest of the militia. As a result, half the force was withdrawn in July 1899 and returned to Canada, this time travelling via the faster route of White Pass and Skagway through United States' territory. In October, war broke out between Britain and the Boer Republics in South Africa; Canada raised a force to deploy in support of the British. Thomas Evans was withdrawn from the Yukon in November to join the effort, and was replaced as the force's commander by Major T. Hemming.

In May 1900, the force left Fort Selkirk and focused solely on Dawson. On June 25, the remainder of the force was withdrawn on the advice of the Minister of Militia, again returning via White Pass and Skagway. Their uniforms, rifles and Maxim guns remained behind and were later reused by the volunteer militia Dawson Rifle Company, formed the following year, while the artillery was given to the mounted police. The mounted police continued their presence at Fort Selkirk, making use of the force's former barracks until 1911.

== Legacy ==
Three buildings built by the force survive at Fort Selkirk: the officers' residence and the former guard room, which were moved to new locations on the site by a local man called Alex Coward in the 1920s and known today as "Coward Cabin" and "the Garage", and the orderly room, which remains in its original location. The Yukon Field Force cemetery, where three soldiers and some members of the local community are buried, is located nearby. The force's two 7-pounder guns are on display at the offices of the Royal Canadian Mounted Police in Dawson City.

== Notable Members ==
Four of the officers who served with the force later rose to the rank of Major-General during the First World War.

- Major T.D.R. Hemming, as Major-General (CMG), commanded Military District No. 3 from 1913 to 1918.
- The force's medical officer, Surgeon-Major G.L. Foster, became Major-General (CB, FRCS, LL.D) and was Director General of Medical Services, Overseas Military Forces of Canada, 1918–1919.
- Captain H.E. Burstall, RCA, later Major-General Sir Henry Burstall, KCB, KCMC, commanded the artillery of the Canadian Corps, 1915–1916, and from December 1916 to demobilization commanded the 2nd Canadian Division.
- Captain P.F. Thacker became Major-General (CB, CMG) and was Adjutant General, 1918–1919.

== Bibliography ==
- Allen, Douglas W. (2007). "Information Sharing During the Klondike Gold Rush". The Journal of Economic History. 67 (4): 1–24. doi:10.1017/S0022050707000459. ISSN 0022-0507. S2CID 154301382.
- Berton, Pierre (2001). Klondike: The Last Great Gold Rush 1896–1899. Toronto, Canada: Anchor Canada. ISBN 978-0-385-65844-7.
- Coates, Ken (1994). "Introduction". In Adney, Tappan (ed.). The Klondike Stampede. Vancouver, Canada: University of British Columbia Press. ISBN 978-0-7748-0489-9.
- Fetherling, George (1997). The Gold Crusades: A Social History of Gold Rushes, 1849–1929. Toronto, Canada: University of Toronto Press. ISBN 978-0-8020-8046-2.
- Gates, Michael (1997). Gold at Fortymile Creek: Early Days in the Yukon. Vancouver, Canada: University of British Columbia Press. ISBN 978-0-7748-0492-9.
- Greenhous, Brereton (1987). Guarding the Goldfields: The Story of the Yukon Field Force. Toronto, Canada: Dundurn Press. ISBN 978-1-55002-028-1.
- Horn, Bernd (2008). Establishing a Legacy: The History of the Royal Canadian Regiment, 1883–1953. Toronto, Canada and Oxford, UK: Dundurn Press. ISBN 978-1-55002-817-1.
- Macleod, R. C. (1976). The North-West Mounted Police and Law Enforcement, 1873–1905. Toronto, Canada and Buffalo, US: University of Toronto Press. ISBN 978-0-8020-5333-6.
- Morrison, William Robert (1974). "The North-West Mounted Police and the Klondike Gold Rush". Journal of Contemporary History. 9 (2): 93–105. doi:10.1177/002200947400900204. ISSN 0022-0094. S2CID 159897122.
- Morrison, William Robert (1985). Showing the Flag: The Mounted Police and Canadian Sovereignty in the North, 1894–1925. Vancouver, Canada: University of British Columbia Press. ISBN 978-0-7748-0245-1.
- Porsild, Charlene (1998). Gamblers and Dreamers: Women, Men, and Community in the Klondike. Vancouver, Canada: University of British Columbia Press. ISBN 978-0-7748-0651-0.
- Winslow, Kathryn (1952). Big Pan-Out: The Klondike Story. London, UK: Phoenix House. OCLC 465425340.
- Wright, Allen A. (1976). Prelude to Bonanza: The Discovery and Exploration of the Yukon. Sidney, Canada: Gray's Publishing. ISBN 978-0-88826-062-8.
- Zaslow, Morris (1971). The Opening of the Canadian North, 1870–1914. Toronto, Canada: McClelland and Steward. ISBN 978-0-7710-9072-1.
