= Pam Brown =

Australian poet (born 1948)

- Born: Pamela Jane Barclay Brown; 1948 (age 77–78); Seymour, Victoria, Australia
- Occupation: Poet
- Partner: Jane Zemiro

Pamela Jane Barclay Brown (born 1948) is an Australian poet.

== Career ==
Pam Brown was born in Seymour, Victoria. Most of her childhood was spent on military bases in Toowoomba and Brisbane. Since her early twenties, she has lived in Melbourne and Adelaide, and has travelled widely in the Pacific and Indian Ocean regions as well as Europe and the U.S., but mostly she has lived in Sydney, on the unceded land of the Eora Nation. She has made her living variously as a silkscreen printer, bookseller, postal worker and has taught writing, multi-media studies and film-making. Pam Brown worked from 1989 to 2006 as a librarian at University of Sydney.

From 1997 to 2002 Pam Brown was the poetry editor of Overland and from 2004 to 2011 she was the associate editor of Jacket magazine. She has been a guest at poetry festivals worldwide, taught at the University for Foreign Languages, Hanoi, and during 2003 had Australia Council writers residency in Rome. In 2013 she held the Distinguished Visitor Award at the University of Auckland, New Zealand.

== Awards and nominations ==
Nominations

- 1984 — NSW Premier's Literary Award for Poetry for New & Selected Poems 1971–1982
- 1999 — NSW Premier's Kenneth Slessor Award for Poetry for 50-50
- 2004 — The Age Book Of The Year Award — Poetry, VIC for True Thoughts
- 2010 — Adelaide Festival Award for Poetry, SA for True Thoughts
- 2010 — The Age Book Of The Year Award — Poetry, VIC for Authentic Local
- 2018 — Judith Wright Calanthe Award — Poetry, QLD for click here for what we do
- 2019 — Prime Minister's Literary Award for Poetry — for click here for what we do
- 2023 — NSW Premier's Kenneth Slessor Award for Poetry — for Stasis Shuffle

Awards

- 2004 — New South Wales Premier's Kenneth Slessor Prize for Poetry for Dear Deliria: New & Selected Poems
- 2018 — Adelaide Festival Awards for Literature - John Bray Award for Poetry, SA for Missing up
- 2019 — ALS Gold Medal for click here for what we do
- 2022 — Judith Wright Calanthe Award — Poetry, QLD for Stasis Shuffle

== Bibliography ==
=== Books published ===
- Sureblock, (Pat Woolley, Melbourne, 1972)
- Cocabola's Funny Picture Book, (Tomato Press, Sydney, 1973)
- Automatic Sad, (Tomato Press, Sydney, 1974)
- Cafe Sport, (Sea Cruise Books, Sydney, 1979)
- Correspondences, (Red Press, Sydney, 1979)
- Country & Eastern, (Never-Never Books, Sydney, 1980)
- Small Blue View, (E.A.F./Magic Sam, Adelaide, 1982)
- Selected Poems 1971–1982, (Redress/Wild & Woolley, Sydney, 1984)
- Keep It Quiet, (Sea Cruise Books, Sydney, 1987)
- New & Selected Poems, (Wild & Woolley, Sydney, 1990)
- This World. This Place. (University of Queensland Press, Brisbane, 1994)
- 50 – 50, (Little Esther Books, Adelaide, 1997)
- Text thing (Little Esther Books, Adelaide, 2002)
- Dear Deliria (New & Selected Poems), (Salt Publishing, UK/US/Aust, 2003)
- True Thoughts (Salt Publishing, U.K./U.S.A/Aust, 2008)
- Authentic Local (Soi 3 Modern Poets, papertiger media, Aust/Thailand, 2010 )
- Home by Dark (Shearsman Books, UK/US/Aust, 2013)
- Alibis (poems translated into French by Jane Zemiro) (Société Jamais-Jamais, Sydney, 2014)
- Missing up (Vagabond Press, Tokyo/Sydney, 2015)
- Click here for what we do (Vagabond Press, Tokyo/Sydney, 2018)
- Endings & Spacings (Never-Never Books, Sydney, 2021)
- Stasis Shuffle (Hunter Publishers, Saint Lucia, QLD 2021)
- Guess the Experience (Hunter Publishers, Saint Lucia, QLD, 2025)

=== Chapbooks ===
- Little Droppings (Never-Never Books, Sydney 1994)
- My Lightweight Intentions (Salt/Folio, U.K./Perth 1998)(2nd Edition Never-Never Books, Sydney 2006)
- Drifting Topoi (Vagabond Press, Sydney, 2000)
- eleven 747 poems (Wild Honey Press, Ireland, 2002)
- Let’s Get Lost (with Ken Bolton and Laurie Duggan)(Vagabond Press, Sydney 2005)
- Peel Me A Zibibbo (Never-Never Books, Sydney, 2006)
- farout_library_software (with Maged Zaher) (Tinfish Press, Hawai'i, USA 2007)
- Sentimental (Longhouse Books, USA 2010)
- In My Phone (Picaro Press, NSW 2011)
- Anyworld (flying island books, Macau, 2012)
- More than a feuilleton (Little Esther Books, Adelaide, 2012)
- Westernity (Stale Objects De Press, Sydney, 2016)
- A mockery (Otoliths, QLD, 2017)
- from Shimmy (with John Kinsella), (Shed Under the Mountain Press, W.A., 2019)
- (pressure's on) (Never-Never Books, Sydney, 2020)
- A love supreme (Now Orries Press, Melbourne, 2023)

=== In translation ===
- Alibis poems translated from English into French by Jane Zemiro (Société Jamais-Jamais, Sydney 2014)

=== Electronic books ===
- The Meh of Z Z Z Z (AhaDada Books, US/Japan 2010)
