= Gwen Fenton =

Australian Antarctic biologist

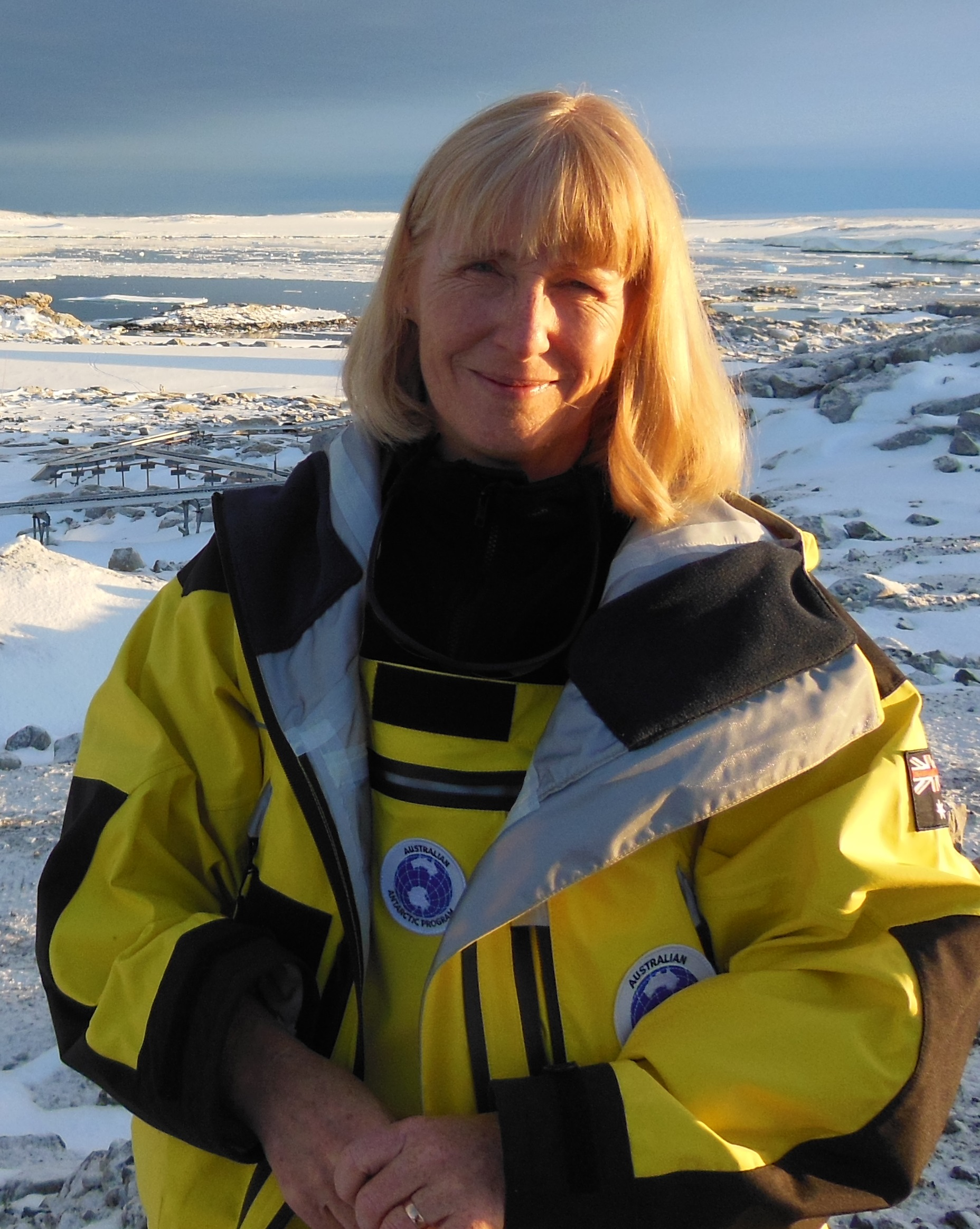
- Education: University of Tasmania
- Known for: First female Chief Scientist of the Australian Antarctic Division
- Scientific career
- Fields: Biology
- Workplaces: Australian Antarctic Division

Gwen Fenton was the Chief Scientist of the Australian Antarctic Division and is the first woman to hold this position. She discovered that the fish species Hoplostethus atlanticus can live to over 100 years old, leading to significant changes to the management of the species.

== Early life and education ==
Fenton grew up in Australia, the daughter of two scientists. Her mother was a zoologist and her father was a cosmic ray and aurora physicist who worked with the Australian Antarctic Division during the 1950s. She completed a science degree with Honours at the University of Tasmania on coastal krill from south-eastern Australia and southern New Zealand. She continued her work at the University of Tasmania as part of a PhD focused on mysid crustaceans, discovering three new genera and 12 new species, graduating in 1986 at the age of 24.

== Career and impact ==
Fenton's post-doctoral work at the University of Tasmania resulted in the development of a technique to age fish based on the radioactive decay of radium-226 to lead-210. This revolutionized the understanding of the age of the important fishery species, orange roughy. Her work revealed that this species is extremely slow-growing, not maturing until between 20 and 25 years of age, with significant implications for sustainable management of catch limits for the species.

Fenton joined the Tasmanian Government in marine environmental management and policy development in 1996. In her role she developed environmental monitoring programs for Tasmanian salmon farms, developed ballast water policy and provided advice on marine infrastructure developments. In 2003 she joined the Australian Antarctic Division as the Manager of Science Planning and Coordination.

In 2015 Fenton became the first female Chief Scientist of the Australian Antarctic Division. Her role includes reviewing the Antarctic Science Strategic Plan and strengthening collaborations with East Antarctic partners such as China, India, Japan and France. She will also be working to ensure that the science program is ready to take advantage of the expanded capability that will come with the launch of Australia's new icebreaker in 2020. Fenton resigned in November 2019. She was succeeded by Nicole Webster.
