= Faith Fenton =

Canadian school teacher and investigative journalist

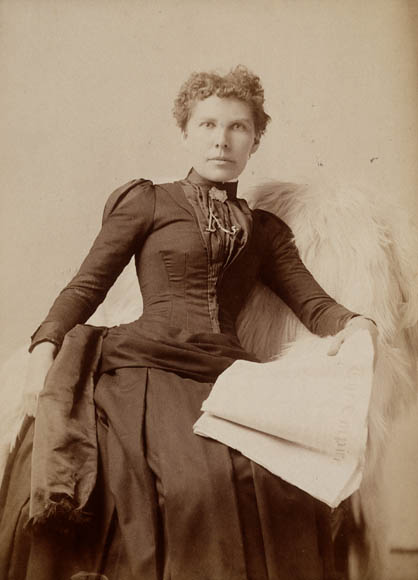
Faith Fenton in 1885

Alice Freeman (1857 - 1936) was a Canadian school teacher and investigative journalist. She became Canada's first female columnist while writing for the Toronto Empire newspaper. Freeman wrote under the pseudonym Faith Fenton to keep her job as a teacher, as journalism was seen as an unacceptably disreputable activity for a teacher to be involved in. With the low salary she earned at these jobs, she required both salaries to support herself.

== Childhood ==
Fenton was the third of twelve children, and was sent to live with a Bowmanville, Ontario minister and his wife when Fenton was age ten. Margaret Reike, her foster mother, ensured Fenton got an education beyond what her parents might have afforded.

== Journalism career ==
Fenton began her journalist career in 1886 as a Toronto correspondent for the Northern Advance, a daily newspaper in Barrie, Ontario. In 1888, she began writing a column for The Toronto Empire. The column, titled "Women's Empire", dealt with issues relevant to women of the day: sexual discrimination, sexual harassment, child abuse and the gender wage gap. Fenton wrote columns at night, travelled to work as a journalist during the summer, while remaining a teacher during the day. As a writer, she interviewed famous people of the day like Susan B. Anthony, Oliver Wendell Holmes, Catherine Parr Traill, Pauline Johnson and Emma Albani. She kept her double identity secret until 1893. She resigned her job as a schoolteacher in 1894 and became a full-time journalist.

When gold was discovered in the Yukon, Fenton accompanied the Yukon Field Force's nurses to the Yukon as a correspondent for The Globe. Fenton departed Toronto in the spring, arriving in the Yukon in August. In the Yukon, Fenton met and married Dr. John Brown. Fenton took up residence in Dawson City and began to send reports of the gold rush back to eastern Canada. She returned to Toronto in 1904.

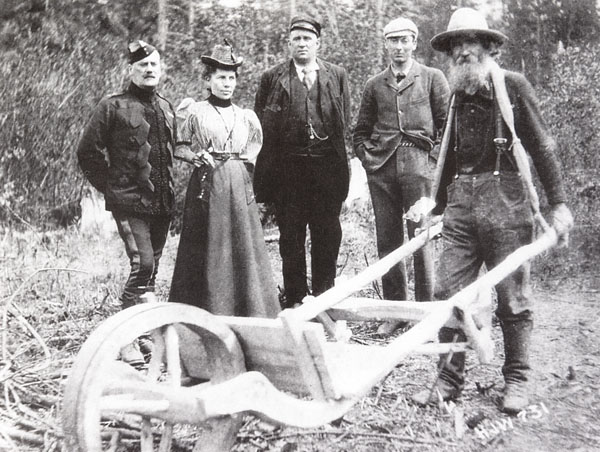
Faith Fenton on assignment in the Yukon
