= Frank Fenton =

Francis or Frank Fenton may refer to:

- Francis Dart Fenton (c.1824–1898), New Zealand magistrate, administrator and musician
- Frank Fenton (writer) (1903–1971), English-born American writer
- Frank Fenton (actor) (1906–1957), American stage, film and television actor
