= Mildred Adams Fenton =

American paleontologist

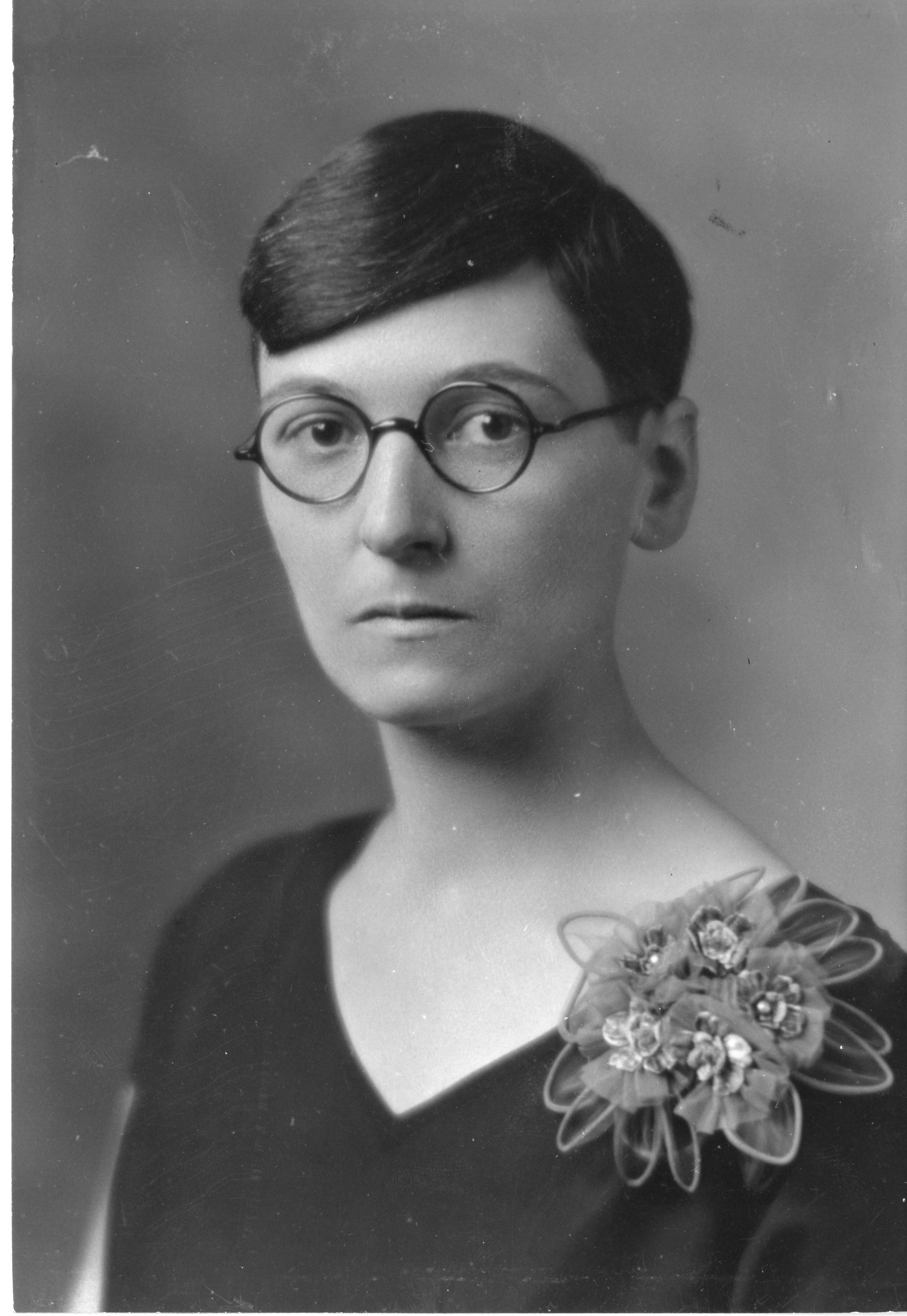
- Mildred Adams Fenton
- Born: 14 November 1899; Cedar County, Iowa
- Died: 7 December 1995 (aged 96); Iowa City, Iowa
- Scientific career
- Fields: paleontology geology
- Workplaces: University of Iowa
- Author abbrev. (botany): M.A.Fenton

Mildred Adams Fenton (November 14, 1899 – December 7, 1995) trained in paleontology and geology at the University of Iowa. She coauthored dozens of general science books with her husband, Carroll Lane Fenton, including Records of Evolution (1924), Land We Live On (1944), and Worlds in the Sky (1963).

== Early life and education ==
Mildred Adams was born near West Branch, Iowa, the daughter of Ollie M. Adams and Mary Ann Yetter Adams. She graduated from the University of Chicago, where she met her husband Carroll Lane Fenton while they were both undergraduates.

== Scientific work and field research ==
During the 1920s and 1930s, Fenton and Carroll Lane Fenton undertook field research on fossils and geological formations, with their summers devoted to studying both modern organisms and ancient rocks and fossils. Their research included work on Devonian fossils in Iowa and the Mississippi Valley, as well as studies of fossil traces and structures. The couple's first joint scientific publication, on Black River brachiopods from the Mississippi Valley, appeared in the Proceedings of the Iowa Academy of Science in 1922. Fenton also published scientific work under her own name, including studies of Lichenocrinus in 1929.

Fenton's research with her husband also contributed to the development of neoichnology, the study of the traces and activities of organisms preserved in the geological record. In a 1994 historical study of ichnology, George Pemberton and James MacEachern described the Fentons' work in the 1930s comparing traces made by living organisms with fossil traces as an early example of the actualistic approach later associated with neoichnology. Their work included investigations of fossil burrows, trails and other traces, linking observations of modern organisms with interpretations of the fossil record.

== Selected publications ==
In addition to their scholarly contributions, the couple wrote fifty books on general science topics, and her photographs were often used as illustrations. Unless otherwise indicated, Fenton was co-author on the following articles and books, with her husband Carroll Lane Fenton.

=== Scholarly works ===
- "Some Black River Brachiopods from the Mississippi Valley" (1922)
- "Nortonechinus, a Devonian Echinoid" (1923)
- The Stratigraphy and Fauna of the Hackberry Stage of the Upper Devonian (1925)
- "A New Species of Schizophoria from the Devonian of Iowa" (1928)
- "Notes on Several forms of Lichenocrinus from Black River Formations" (1929, solo author)
- "Some Snail Borings of Paleozoic Age" (1931)
- "Boring Sponges in the Devonian of Iowa" (1932)
- "Orientation and Injury in the Genus Atrypa" (1932)
- "Hail Prints and Mud-Cracks of Proterozoic Age" (1933)
- "Algal Reefs or Bioherms in the Belt Series of Montana" (1933)
- "Atrypae described by Clement L. Webster and related forms (Devonian, Iowa)" (1935)
- "Burrows and Trails from Pennsylvanian Rocks of Texas" (1937)
- "Belt Series of the North: Stratigraphy, Sedimentation, Paleontology" (1937)
- "Archaeonassa: Cambrian Snail Trails and Burrows" (1937)
- "Pre-Cambrian and Paleozoic Algae" (1939)

=== General science books ===
- Records of Evolution (1924)
- The World of Fossils (1933) LCCN 33-21909
- The Rock Book (1940) LCCN 40-307282003 Dover reprint. ISBN 0486422674. LCCN 2003265242.
- Land We Live On (1944) LCCN 44-5441; 1966 2nd edition. LCCN 66014864.
- Rocks and Their Stories (1951) LCCN 51-12152
- Riches from the Earth (1953)
- The Fossil Book: A Record of Prehistoric Life (1958)
- Worlds in the Sky (1963)
- Mountains (1969)

== Personal life ==
Mildred Adams and Carroll Lane Fenton married in 1921. The couple established a scholarship fund for Hopi students at Northern Arizona University. She was president of the New Jersey and Iowa chapters of the Daughters of Founders and Patriots of America. She traveled extensively in her later years, including several trips to Australia and a visit to Russia. Carroll died in 1969, and she died in 1995, at the age of 96, in Iowa City.
