= Fenton Keogh =

Australian chef

- Born: 21 December 1971 (age 54)
- Culinary career
- Previous restaurant: Fentons at the Ipswich Club
- Television show: Great BBQ Challenge

Fenton Brian Keogh (born 21 December 1971) is an Australian celebrity chef and winner of LifeStyle Food's Great BBQ Challenge in January 2007. He and his wife Lisa were the owners of Fentons at the Ipswich Club, located in Ipswich, Queensland and previously on Limestone Street, which opened in January 2000 and closed in May 2014

His signature dish, Aussie Pav with Boozy Summer Fruits, was featured on the Australia Day special on the Today Show 26.01.07 (Nine Network). Though not prepared the traditional way in an oven, the pavlova was all done on the BBQ in 10 minutes. It was shot totally live alongside Channel 9 personality Scott Cam.
