= Carroll Lane Fenton =

American paleontologist

- Born: February 12, 1900; Butler County, Iowa
- Died: November 16, 1969 (aged 69); New Brunswick, New Jersey
- Scientific career
- Fields: paleontology geology
- Workplaces: University of Iowa
- Author abbrev. (botany): C.L.Fenton

Carroll Lane Fenton (February 12, 1900, Butler County, Iowa – November 16, 1969, New Brunswick, New Jersey) was a geologist, paleontologist, neoichnologist, and historian of science.

== Biography ==
Fenton was the author and illustrator of numerous books on geology and paleontology for a general audience. He published extensively in the field of paleontology in both the professional literature and in popular journals. He was an associate editor of the American Midland Naturalist from 1923 to 1960, expanding the coverage of the journal into the arena of paleontology.

As an undergraduate in geology at the University of Chicago Fenton met and married fellow undergraduate, Mildred Adams. (Many of his later books were written with his wife, as Mildred Adams Fenton). He received his Bachelor of Science in 1921, then his Doctor of Philosophy in 1926.

Fenton was a critic of creationism and documented the evidence for evolution in a series of Little Blue Books in the early 1920s.

== Publications ==
- A History of Evolution (Little Blue Book No. 321) (1922)
- Darwin as a Naturalist (Little Blue Book No. 567) (1924)
- Darwin and the Theory of Evolution (Little Blue Book No. 568) (1924)
- Haeckel's Monistic Philosophy (Little Blue Book No. 599) (1924)
- The Evidence for Evolution (Little Blue Book No. 694) (1924)
- Embryology and its Evidence for Evolution. (Little blue book No. 695) (1924)
- The Fitness of Life (Little Blue Book No. 799) (1925)
- Life Among the Apes and Monkeys (Little Blue Book No. 827) (1925)
- The World of Fossils (1933)
- Holiday Shore (written by Edith M. Patch with illustrations by Fenton) (1935)
- Life Long Ago: The Story of Fossils (1937)
- Our Amazing Earth (1938)
- The Rock Book (with Mildred Adams Fenton) (1940; updated 2003, with new material by Thomas H. Rich and Patricia Vickers-Rich)
- Earth's Adventures: The Story of Geology for Young People (1942)
- Mountains (with Mildred Adams Fenton) (1942)
- Our Living World (1943)
- The Land We Live On (with Mildred Adams Fenton) (1944)
- The Story of the Great Geologists (with Mildred Adams Fenton) (1945)
- Wild Folk at the Pond (1948); juv
- Worlds in the Sky (with Mildred Adams Fenton) (1950)
- Rocks and Their Stories (with Mildred Adams Fenton) (1951)
- Giants of Geology (1952)
- Wild Folk in the Woods (1952); juv
- Riches from the Earth (with Mildred Adams Fenton) (1953); juv
- Our Changing Weather (1954)
- Prehistoric World (1954; 1957)
- Plants That Feed Us (with Herminie B. Kitchen) (1956)
- The Fossil Book (with Mildred Adams Fenton) (1958)
- Wild Folk in the Desert (1958); juv
- Prehistoric Zoo (1959); juv
- Wild Folk at the Seashore (1959); juv
- Reptiles and Their World (1961)
- In Prehistoric Seas (with Mildred Adams Fenton) (1962); juv
- Birds We Live With (with Mildred Adams Fenton) (1963); juv
- The Moon for Young Explorers (with Mildred Adams Fenton) (1963)
- Tales Told by Fossils (1966)
- Animals That Help Us: The Story of Domestic Animals (1973)
