= Suzanne Fenton =

American biologist

- Education: University of Wisconsin–Madison
- Scientific career
- Fields: Endocrinology, toxicology, reproductive physiology
- Workplaces: United States Environmental Protection Agency; National Institute of Environmental Health Sciences; North Carolina State University

Suzanne E. Fenton is an American biologist specializing in endocrinology and reproductive physiology. She has served as the director of the Center for Human Health and the Environment at North Carolina State University since 2023. Fenton previously a researcher at the United States Environmental Protection Agency and National Institute of Environmental Health Sciences.

== Life ==
Fenton received her B.S., M.S., and Ph.D., from the University of Wisconsin–Madison, in the areas of endocrinology and reproductive physiology, specifically training in the area of mammary gland and lactation biology. Her 1993 dissertation was titled, Modulation of Epidermal Growth Factor-Induced Cell Signaling in Mammary Epithelium by Prolactin. She completed her post-doctoral work at the UNC Lineberger Comprehensive Cancer Center in the area of cancer biology.

Fenton worked as a principal investigator at the U.S. Environmental Protection Agency's reproductive toxicology division from 1998 to 2009. She joined the National Institute of Environmental Health Sciences in September 2009 as a reproductive endocrinologist in the mechanistic toxicology branch. She researched how per- and polyfluoroalkyl substances and other environmental chemicals affect health across the lifespan — from fetal outcomes and mammary gland development to breast cancer risk and metabolic disease. In October 2023, Fenton was named director of the Center for Human Health and the Environment at North Carolina State University.
