= Julia Zemiro =

Australian television host and comedian

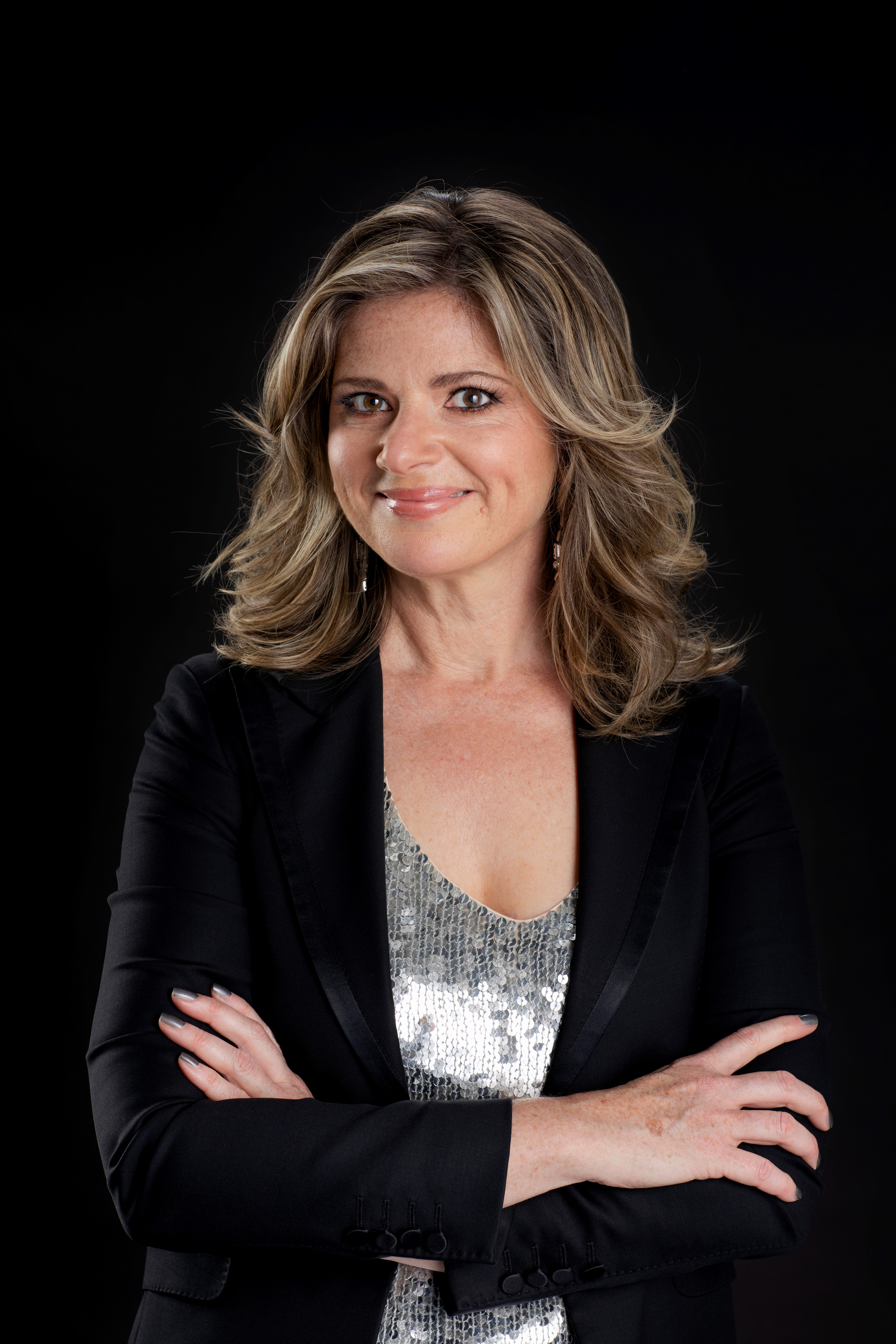
- Zemiro in 2019
- Born: 14 April 1967 (age 59); Aix-en-Provence, France
- Citizenship: Australia; France
- Education: University of Sydney (BA); University of Melbourne (BFA)
- Occupations: Television presenter; radio presenter; actress; singer; writer; comedian
- Years active: 1994–present
- Known for: RocKwiz
- Relatives: Jane Zemiro (mother)

Julia Zemiro (/zəmɪəroʊ/; born 14 April 1967) is an Australian television presenter, radio host, actress, singer, writer, and comedian. She is best known as the host of the music quiz and live performance show RocKwiz. Zemiro, who was born in France, is a fluent English and French speaker and has acted in French.

== Early life and education ==
Julia Zemiro was born in Aix-en-Provence, France on 14 April 1967. In 1970, when she was two and a half years old, her family moved to Australia. Her mother, Jane, is a retired teacher and education academic (University of Sydney) originally from Queensland. Her French father, Claude, was a retired restaurateur.

Zemiro attended Sydney Girls High School and the University of Sydney, where she studied for a Bachelor of Arts. She moved to Melbourne after being accepted into the Victorian College of the Arts, graduating in 1994 with a Diploma of Dramatic Arts (Acting).

== Acting ==
After graduation, Zemiro found work touring with the Bell Shakespeare Company. She featured in various short films, including The Extra and Muffled Love, winning the Tropfest Best Actress award twice, in 1999 (for The Extra) and in 2001 (for Muffled Love). She co-wrote, performed and directed Backpackers for the 2000 Melbourne International Comedy Festival.

Zemiro appeared as Bronya in Eurovision, the Musical (2003), Euromax 7 The Musical (2004) and Eürobeat: Almost Eurovision (2006).

A long-time Theatresports veteran, Zemiro played at the Belvoir St Theatre, Sydney, for many years before her move to Melbourne. She performed with Impro Melbourne, starring in their annual season of Celebrity Theatresports, and regularly appeared in their Melbourne International Comedy Festival hit, "Late Nite Impro". She was a core cast member of the improvised stage show Spontaneous Broadway.

In 2014, Zemiro played Roxane's duenna in Edmond Rostand's 1897 play Cyrano de Bergerac opposite Richard Roxburgh's Cyrano with the Sydney Theatre Company.

== Television ==
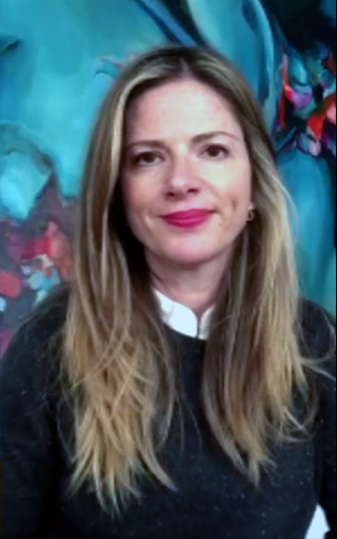
Zemiro in 2016

Zemiro first appeared as a television presenter as the host of World Telly 2, an international co-production. She previously appeared in the original World Telly as part of an improvised comedy group. The World Telly programmes were broadcast by ABC's Australia Television, the ABC's original but now defunct venture into international satellite broadcasting.

Zemiro became a regular panellist and debater for Good News Week, as well as a writer and performer for two seasons on Totally Full Frontal, in which she played over 30 characters.

From 2005, she hosted RocKwiz, a music quiz show originally produced for SBS recorded at The Espy up until 2016. The show was rebooted in 2023 by Foxtel, filmed in a studio for a limited run of 8 episodes. Following its television success the show was adapted into a touring format and continues to tour yearly since 2016. The show has had over 200 shows both on TV and national touring.

Zemiro has enjoyed a variety of performances on television. She appeared in an episode of CNNNN as the host of "Animal Farm". She was a judge on LifeStyle Food's Great BBQ Challenge in 2006 and 2007. In 2006, she appeared on the comedy show The Wedge as various characters.

In May/June 2006, Zemiro hosted the one-off SBS series Song for the Socceroos, a talent show in search of a theme song for the Australian Socceroos soccer team for the 2006 FIFA World Cup. The group Freedom of Thought won the competition with their song "Green and Gold (Song for the Socceroos)", which peaked at number 26 on the ARIA Charts.

In 2007, Zemiro appeared in and won Australia's Brainiest TV Star. The same year, she was a contestant on Channel Seven's It Takes Two, paired with Dave Gleeson.

Zemiro has appeared in television commercials, including as a satiric French fashion expert called Fifi La Croix for Target's breast cancer campaign. She appeared as a guest in the third episode of Top Gear Australia and in 2009 on ADbc. She appeared as a frequent participant on Thank God You're Here and Talkin' 'Bout Your Generation. In 2011, she appeared in the final episode of The Bazura Project's Guide To Sinema as a fake chat show host.

Together with 3RRR radio personality Sam Pang, Zemiro was a commentator for the SBS broadcast of the Eurovision Song Contests in 2009 in Moscow, Russia, in 2010 in Oslo, Norway, in 2011 in Düsseldorf, Germany, in 2012 in Baku, Azerbaijan, in 2013 in Malmö, Sweden, in 2014 in Copenhagen, Denmark, in 2015 in Vienna, Austria, and in 2016, in Stockholm, Sweden.

She appeared in Conspiracy 365 during 2012, a 12-part Australian drama series on FMC as Oriana De La Force.

Zemiro appeared on BBC's QI in November 2012, after appearing on stage with Stephen Fry and Alan Davies on QI Live (stage version of the QI show) in Melbourne in December 2011. She has subsequently appeared on QI in January 2013 and January 2016.

She took the French-speaking role of Isabelle in the 2013 ABC TV film An Accidental Soldier, a film directed by Rachel Ward and set in France during World War I. Her interview program, Julia Zemiro's Home Delivery, began on ABC1 on 18 September 2013. Over the span of 77 episodes, she initially focused on interviewing Australian comedians and then expanded to include a broader range of guests.

Zemiro hosted the 2014 New Year's Eve telecast from Sydney Harbour with Toby Truslove for ABC TV. In 2021 hosted the live television special Australia's Biggest Singalong! with Miranda Tapsell.

Since 2021, she has starred in hugely successful ABC comedy series Fisk alongside creator Kitty Flanagan and comedian Aaron Chen. The show has won multiple awards, including a Logie Award for Julia for Best Supporting Actress in 2025.

From August 2023, the new series Great Australian Walks, hosted by Zemiro and featuring a variety of famous guests, aired on SBS Television. Each of the 10 episodes is devoted to exploring walks around Australia that are both historically significant and scenic. Guests on the first series included actress Tasma Walton; former national rugby player, later politician, David Pocock; and musician Pete O'Doherty. The second series of 10 episodes launched in August 2024, co-hosted by Susie Youssef and Gina Chick owing to other commitments by Zemiro. Zemiro covers the Northern Territory and Western Australia, while Youssef takes on Victoria and South Australia, and Chick New South Wales and Tasmania.

From November 2025, Zemiro has hosted a new series called "Crime Night!" for ABC TV, a six-episode factual comedy series examining the science and psychology behind crimes.

== Political views and activities ==
Zemiro emceed the feminist March 4 Justice protest rally outside Parliament House, Canberra, in March 2021. In September 2021, Zemiro hosted the launch of the Independent climate activist Kylea Tink's campaign against sitting Liberal Member for North Sydney Trent Zimmerman.

On 3 September 2020, Zemiro posted in a tweet that former-Liberal Prime Minister Tony Abbott is "a dickhead that keeps on giving and why won’t he shut up." During the 2021 Delta Variant outbreak of COVID-19, Zemiro called for Liberal Premier Gladys Berejiklian to be replaced, because New South Wales experienced 390 cases of the contagious variant in a day. Following Berejiklian's resignation in October, Zemiro declared her opposition to Dominic Perrottet becoming premier; she also posted a petition which said white men who are "openly religious" should not hold leadership positions.

Zemiro's ABC program Julia Zemiro's Home Delivery covers contemporary political and cultural issues through personal interviews with celebrities, artists, politicians, and political commentators such as Derryn Hinch, Jacqui Lambie, Germaine Greer, Barrie Cassidy and Gillian Triggs. Zemiro praised human rights commissioner Gillian Triggs as a formidable "social justice advocate [whose] investigation into Australia's human rights record [won] her a legion of friends and some very powerful enemies". The program defended Triggs against criticism of political bias.

In February 2022, a New Year's Eve Tweet by Zemiro was queried in a Senate Estimates hearing in relation to the ABC's social media guidelines on impartiality and balance. Zemiro tweeted: "On this final day of 2021 I pledge to do whatever I can to vote this NSW state and Federal govt out I'm not sure what the alternatives will be But I WILL NOT reward @ScottMorrisonMP @Dom_Perrottet and their ilk with another 'go' at it." ABC Managing Director David Anderson said "Ms Zemiro is not a journalist, so she's not reporting on politics at any particular point in time. She has a factual entertainment program and is espousing her own views."

In May 2026, as a French citizen, Julia ran on the NSW ticket for the French consular elections on the Elan Citoyen ticket, a centrist political group.
