= Jane Zemiro =

Australian academic and author (born 1939)

- Born: 4 October 1939 (age 87); Miles, Queensland, Australia
- Education: University of Queensland
- Occupations: Teacher, author
- Employer: University of Sydney (retired)
- Spouse: Claude (divorced)
- Partner: Pam Brown
- Children: Julia Zemiro
- Awards: Ordre des Palmes Académiques

Elizabeth Jane Zemiro (born 4 October 1939) is an Australian academic and author. She was awarded the Ordre des Palmes Académiques by the French Government in 2000. Zemiro is the mother of actor and television presenter Julia Zemiro.

== Biography ==
Zemiro was born in Miles, Queensland in 1939 and she grew up in Maryborough, Queensland. She studied at the University of Queensland and was awarded a Bachelor of Arts degree.

In the mid-1960s, Zemiro travelled to France by ship. On board, she met French-Algerian waiter Claude Zemiro, whom she subsequently married. In France, Zemiro studied at the University of Aix-en-Provence where she gained a licence dès lettres. In 1967, Jane and Claude had a daughter, Julia. After returning from France, the family lived in Zemiro's home town of Maryborough before settling in Sydney in 1970.

Zemiro taught French in high schools and her husband opened two restaurants, Home Cooking and Crab Apple. Zemiro was subsequently appointed Senior Lecturer in Teaching Studies LOTE at the University of Sydney, where she also obtained a Master of Arts degree. As a lecturer she noted that while students might gain basic language competency in primary school, without follow-up in high school they would not become proficient in a foreign language.

Zemiro co-wrote the book series Tapis Volant and Mini Vol, and Révisions. She also translated poems in the online magazine Ekleksographia: wave two. In 2012, Jane Zemiro co-wrote an article on translating poetry, "An Act of Rash Bravado".

Zemiro is the partner of poet Pam Brown.

== Awards and honours ==
In 2000, Zemiro was awarded the Ordre des Palmes Académiques by the French Government.
