= Jesus Christ in Richmond Park =

British viral video

- Starring: Max Findlay
- Cinematography: Jake Goodyear
- Release date: 20 November 2011
- Running time: 47 seconds
- Country: United Kingdom
- Language: English

Jesus Christ in Richmond Park is a viral YouTube video depicting journalist Max Findlay running after a black Labrador Retriever, Fenton, itself chasing a herd of around 40 stampeding deer over a road in London's Richmond Park. Findlay was recorded repeatedly shouting "Fenton", and "Jesus Christ!" The video was filmed and uploaded on 13 November 2011 by 13-year-old Jake Goodyear, who was visiting the park with his father Ali.

The video went viral by 22 November, particularly on Twitter, where it was a trending topic. It reached 1 million views on 24 November, and prompted a number of parody videos in which Findlay's shouts were set to movie scenes and wildlife footage. Some users falsely believed the dog was named Benton. Findlay was not identified until 13 December and chose to stay largely private. The popularity of the video resulted in the release of a puzzle book titled Find Fenton! and an EE advertisement that remade the footage of the original video.

== Background ==
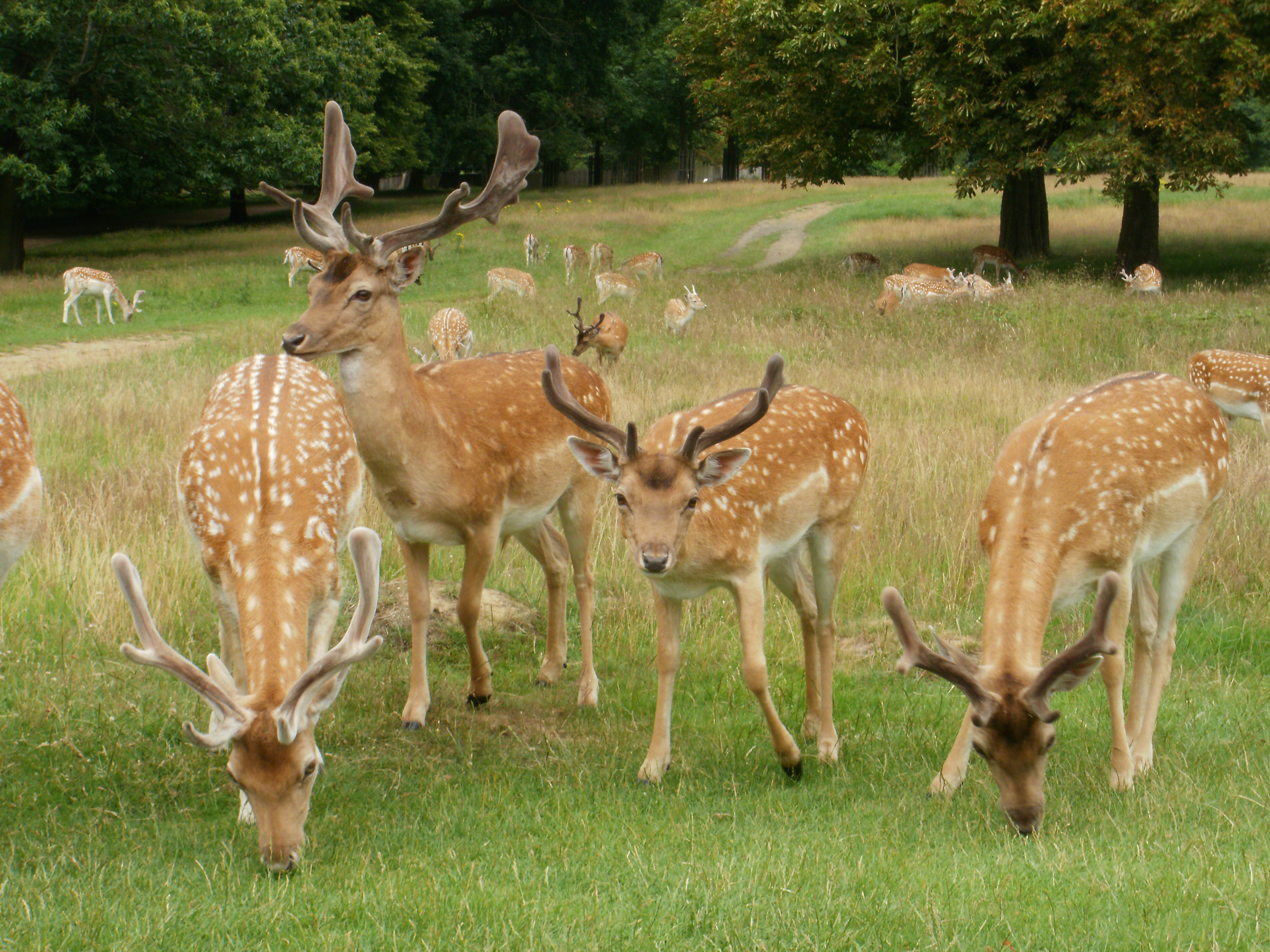
Deer in Richmond Park in 2011

Richmond Park, located in south-west London, is known for its free-roaming red and fallow deer. The charity Friends of Richmond Park estimated that uncontrolled dogs killed about 6 deer, usually the young, in the park each year. That September, a dog owner had accepted a £650 fine after failing to stop her dog from mauling one of the park's deer.

Fenton was a black Labrador Retriever, thought to be a former guide dog, owned by Max Findlay. Findlay is a former barrister, legal journalist and leader writer for the Observer and Financial Times who lived close to Richmond Park at the time. He spent his early career writing for broadsheets and various legal journals before setting up Max Findlay Associates in 1988. He had worked with government departments, accountants, universities and multinational companies. Findlay, aged 60, was a married father of two.

== Incident and video ==
The video was filmed on a mobile phone on Sunday 13 November 2011 by 13-year-old Jake Goodyear from Holloway in north London. Jake was visiting Richmond Park in south-west London with his father Ali, a 37-year-old gardener.

The 47 second video begins with a shot of a herd of deer, of which there are around 40. A man, Max Findlay, repeatedly shouts "Fenton!" The deer begin to move, appearing perturbed. The camera then pans to capture Fenton chasing the deer and causing them to stampede into the distance. Findlay also runs across the park after the dog while repeatedly shouting its name, and the words "Oh, Jesus Christ." They cross a busy road that cuts through the park, forcing cars to stop.

After Jake stopped recording, Ali said that the deer scattered and Fenton disappeared into the woods, with the dog's owner 500 metres behind. He said he was unaware if the video had a happy ending as they ran into the distance. Finding it "very funny", Jake later posted the video on YouTube, also on 13 November, to the channel JAGGL113.

== Responses ==
Initially, several viewers falsely heard the owner shouting "Benton", sparking debate over the name online. However, Ali Goodyear made it clear that the dog's name was Fenton. On 22 November, discussion of the video became the highest trending topic on Twitter in the UK; "Fenton", "Benton", "Richmond Park" and "Jesus Christ" all trended on the website. BBC Radio 2 presenter Jeremy Vine posted about the video to his followers. Dog owners in Richmond Park were interviewed about the incident and were divided on whether the owner should have had better control of Fenton, or whether he should be afforded sympathy. Ali Goodyear stated that he received communications from CBS, CNN, Good Morning America, and German newspapers about the incident.

On 22 November The Daily Telegraph reported that the clip had over 161,500 views. By 23 November, this increased to over 503,000 views, and this increased to over 1 million views by 24 November. Ali agreed to a revenue-sharing deal with YouTube and earned £500 in 24 hours.

A number of parody and remix videos were created from the clip by 23 November, including those superimposing Findlay's shouting over movies such as Ghostbusters, An American Werewolf in London, Jurassic Park, Chariots of Fire, The Lion King and King Kong. The clip was also dubbed into wildlife footage of geese, bison, and wildebeest. It also led to the release of a ringtone by SpaceRace and a t-shirt by Luke Forsythe which retained the name Benton for the dog. The Hoxtons remixed the video, creating a song named "Benton! Jesus Christ!"

Findlay was initially not identified, and at first chose to remain private about the incident. On 28 November, Fenton and the owner were spotted by a journalist for The Sun on Wimbledon Common. Fenton's owner gave his name as Max, though did not speak further. On 13 December, the Daily Mail identified Fenton's owner as Max Findlay. Findlay stated in the article that he didn't "want to add anything to the zillions of words already out there", and would "rather just leave the story where it is and move on." He had not been seen in the park since the incident, and was reportedly considering renaming his dog. Royal Parks police said there was no formal investigation into the incident, but that "the circumstances surrounding the incident are currently being reviewed to ascertain whether park regulations have been breached," stating that they would speak to Findlay.

Viral Spiral, which at the time also represented the rights holders of Charlie Bit My Finger, began managing the rights to the video, selling Fenton mugs and t-shirts. In September 2012, Find Fenton!, a Where's Wally? style puzzle book by author Stuart Cooper and illustrator Martin Berry, in which readers are tasked with finding the dog amongst London landmarks such as the House of Commons and the Royal Albert Hall, was to be published by Headline Books. By this point, the video had been viewed over 6.9 million times. Viral Spiral was also in talks to license an ad campaign, and this resulted in a recreation of the original video in high definition in an advertisement for mobile phone network company EE's 4G service, created by ad agency Poke and production company Passion Pictures. The ad included other animals as well as a dinosaur in the stampede.

The video was also parodied by Jeremy Clarkson on Series 18, Episode 4 of the TV series Top Gear.
