= Steve Fenton (footballer) =

English footballer

Personal information
- Full name: Stephen James Fenton
- Date of birth: 25 February 1951 (age 75)
- Place of birth: Hartlepool, England
- Positions: Full back; midfielder

Senior career*
Years	Team	Apps	(Gls)
	Middlesbrough	0	(0)
1972–1973	Bradford City	10	(1)
- Bradford Park Avenue
- * Club domestic league appearances and goals

Stephen James Fenton (born 25 February 1951) is an English former professional footballer who played as a full back and midfielder.

== Career ==
Born in Hartlepool, Fenton played for Middlesbrough, Bradford City and Bradford Park Avenue.

For Bradford City he made 10 appearances in the Football League, scoring 1 goal. He also scored 1 goal in 3 appearances in the Football League Cup.

== Sources ==
- Frost, Terry (1988). Bradford City A Complete Record 1903-1988. Breedon Books Sport. ISBN 0-907969-38-0.
