= Antarctic Science =

- Discipline: Multidisciplinary
- Language: English
- Edited by: Peter Convey

Publication details
- Former name: British Antarctic Survey Bulletin
- History: 1963–present
- Publisher: Cambridge University Press
- Frequency: Monthly
- Impact factor: 1.417 (2013)

Standard abbreviations
- ISO 4: Antarct. Sci.

Indexing
- Antarctic Science
- CODEN: ANTSE8
- ISSN: 0954-1020 (print); 1365-2079 (web)
- LCCN: 89646613
- OCLC no.: 52032817
- British Antarctic Survey Bulletin
- ISSN: 0007-0262

Links
- Journal homepage

Antarctic Science is a monthly peer-reviewed scientific journal published by Cambridge University Press, focusing on all aspects of scientific research in the Antarctic. The editor-in-chief is Peter Convey (British Antarctic Survey). Previous editors-in-chief include David W. H. Walton (British Antarctic Survey), Walker O. Smith (Virginia Institute of Marine Sciences), Laurie Padman (Earth & Space Research), Alan Rodger (University of Aberystwyth), and John Smellie (University of Leicester).

This journal is a continuation of the "British Antarctic Survey Bulletin" published from 1963 to 1988. Under this former title the journal was indexed in Biological abstracts, Chemical abstracts, and GeoRef. This journal's name was changed to "Antarctic Science" in 1989.

An annual bursary is awarded by the journal to fund research.

== Abstracting and indexing ==
This journal is indexed by the following services:

- Science Citation Index
- Current Contents/ Agriculture, Biology & Environmental Sciences
- Current Contents/ Physical, Chemical & Earth Sciences
- Zoological Record
- BIOSIS Previews
