= 1990 in Australian literature =

This article presents a list of the historical events and publications of Australian literature during 1990.

== Events ==
- Tom Flood won the Miles Franklin Award for Oceana Fine

== Major publications ==
=== Novels ===
- Glenda Adams — Longleg
- Thea Astley — Reaching Tin River
- Lily Brett — Things Could Be Worse
- Sumner Locke Elliott — Fairyland
- Sonya Hartnett — The Glass House
- Susan Johnson – Flying Lessons
- Elizabeth Jolley — Cabin Fever
- Nigel Krauth – JF Was Here
- David Malouf — The Great World
- Colleen McCullough — The First Man in Rome
- Mandy Sayer — Mood Indigo
- Sam Watson – The Kadaitcha Sung
- Morris West — Lazarus

=== Crime and mystery ===
- Jon Cleary — Murder Song
- Peter Corris — O'Fear
- Kerry Greenwood — Flying Too High
- Alex Juniper — A Very Proper Death
- Jennifer Maiden — Play with Knives
- Finola Moorhead — Still Murder
- Kel Richards — The Case of the Vanishing Corpse

=== Science fiction and fantasy ===
- A. Bertram Chandler — From Sea to Shining Star
- Greg Egan
  - "Axiomatic"
  - "Eugene"
  - "Learning to Be Me"
  - "The Moral Virologist"
  - "The Safe-Deposit Box"
- Lucy Sussex — "Red Ochre"
- George Turner — A Pursuit of Miracles: Eight Stories

=== Children's and young adult fiction ===
- Isobelle Carmody — The Farseekers
- Gary Crew — Strange Objects
- Garth Nix — The Ragwitch
- Emily Rodda — Finders Keepers
- Tim Winton — Lockie Leonard, Human Torpedo

=== Poetry ===
- Lee Cataldi — Women Who Live on the Ground: Poems, 1978-1988
- Jean Kent — Verandahs
- Jennifer Maiden — The Winter Baby
- Les Murray — Dog Fox Field
- Jan Owen — Fingerprints on Light

=== Drama ===
- Hannie Rayson — Hotel Sorrento
- David Williamson — Siren

=== Non-fiction ===
- Beverley Farmer — A Body of Water
- Gwen Harwood — Blessed City: The Letters of Gwen Harwood to Thomas Riddell, January to September 1943
- Dorothy Hewett — Wild Card

== Awards and honours ==
- Yasmine Gooneratne AO, for "service to literature and to education"
- Harry Payne Heseltine AO, for "service to education, particularly in the field of Australian literature"
- Rodney Hall (writer) AM, for "service to the arts, particularly in the field of Australian literature"
- Andrew Taylor (poet) AM, for "service to the arts, particularly in the field of Australian literature"
- Elyne Mitchell OAM, for "service to children's literature"

=== Lifetime achievement ===
Award	Author
Christopher Brennan Award	Not awarded
Patrick White Award	Robert Gray

=== Literary ===
Award	Author	Title	Publisher
The Age Book of the Year Award	Gwen Harwood	Blessed City	Angus and Robertson
ALS Gold Medal	Peter Porter	Possible Worlds	Oxford University Press
Colin Roderick Award	Roland Griffiths-Marsh	The Sixpenny Soldier	Angus and Robertson

=== Fiction ===
==== International ====
Award	Category	Author	Title	Publisher
Commonwealth Writers' Prize	Best Novel, SE Asia and South Pacific region	Robert Drewe	The Bay of Contented Men	Picador

==== National ====
Award	Author	Title	Publisher
Adelaide Festival Awards for Literature	Peter Carey	Oscar and Lucinda	University of Queensland Press
The Age Book of the Year Award	Glenda Adams	Longleg	Angus & Robertson
The Australian/Vogel Literary Award	Gillian Mears	The Mint Law	Allen and Unwin
The Australian/Vogel Literary Award	Michael Stephens	Sibling Mischief	Allen and Unwin
Miles Franklin Award	Tom Flood	Oceana Fine	Allen & Unwin
New South Wales Premier's Literary Awards	Thea Astley	Reaching Tin River	William Heinemann Australia
Victorian Premier's Literary Awards	Tom Flood	Oceana Fine	Allen & Unwin
Western Australian Premier's Book Awards	Vasso Kalamaras	The Same Light	Fremantle Arts Centre Press

=== Poetry ===
Award	Author	Title	Publisher
Adelaide Festival Awards for Literature	Gwen Harwood	Bone Scan	Angus & Robertson
Anne Elder Award	Jean Kent	Vernadahs	Hale & Iremonger
Anne Elder Award	Barry Hill	Raft: Poems 1983-1990	Penguin
Grace Leven Prize for Poetry	Not awarded		
Mary Gilmore Award	Kristopher Rassemussen	In the Name of the Father	False Frontiers
New South Wales Premier's Literary Awards	Robert Adamson	The Clean Dark	Paper Bark Press
Victorian Premier's Literary Awards	Robert Adamson	The Clean Dark	Paper Bark Press

=== Children and Young Adult ===
Award	Category	Author	Title	Publisher
Adelaide Festival Awards for Literature	Children's	Gillian Rubinstein	Beyond the Labyrinth	Hyland House
Children's Book of the Year Award	Older Readers	Robin Klein	Came Back to Show You I Could Fly	Viking Books
Children's Book of the Year Award	Picture Book	Margaret Wild & Julie Vivas	The Very Best of Friends	Margaret Hamilton
New South Wales Premier's Literary Awards	Young People's Literature	Katherine Scholes	The Blue Chameleon	Hill of Content
Victorian Premier's Prize for Young Adult Fiction		Diana Kidd	Onion Tears	Collins

=== Science fiction and fantasy ===
Award	Category	Author	Title	Publisher
Australian SF Achievement Award	Best Australian Long Fiction	Wynne Whiteford	Lake of the Sun	Ace
Australian SF Achievement Award	Best Australian Short Fiction	Terry Dowling	"The Quiet Redemption of Andy the House"	Australian Short Stories #26

=== Drama ===
Award	Category	Author	Title
New South Wales Premier's Literary Awards	FilmScript	Jane Campion and Gerard Lee	Sweetie
New South Wales Premier's Literary Awards	FilmScript	Laura Jones	An Angel at My Table
New South Wales Premier's Literary Awards	Play	Not awarded	
Victorian Premier's Literary Awards	Drama	Sam Sejavka	The Hive

=== Non-fiction ===
Award	Author	Title	Publisher
Adelaide Festival Awards for Literature	John Bray	Satura	Wakefield Press
The Age Book of the Year Award	Gwen Harwood	Blessed City	Angus and Robertson
New South Wales Premier's Literary Awards	Siobhan McHugh	The Snowy	William Heinemann Australia
Victorian Premier's Literary Awards	Oskar Spate	The Sixpenny Soldier	Angus and Robertson

== Births ==
A list, ordered by date of birth (and, if the date is either unspecified or repeated, ordered alphabetically by surname) of births in 1990 of Australian literary figures, authors of written works or literature-related individuals follows, including year of death.

Unknown date

- Ellen van Neerven, Indigenous Australian writer and poet

== Deaths ==
A list, ordered by date of death (and, if the date is either unspecified or repeated, ordered alphabetically by surname) of deaths in 1990 of Australian literary figures, authors of written works or literature-related individuals follows, including year of birth.

- 8 March — Jack Lindsay, novelist, biographer, historian and literary critic (born 1900)
- 15 April — William Hart-Smith, poet (born 1911)
- 21 June — Martin Johnston, poet and novelist (born 1947)
- 30 September — Patrick White, novelist, playwright and short story writer (born 1912)

== See also ==
- 1990 in Australia
- 1990 in literature
- 1990 in poetry
- List of years in literature
- List of years in Australian literature
