= Obernewtyn (novel) =

1987 novel by Isobelle Carmody

- 2007 edition cover
- Author: Isobelle Carmody
- Cover artist: Les Petersen
- Language: English
- Series: Obernewtyn Chronicles
- Genre: Fantasy, Science fiction, Post-apocalyptic
- Publisher: Penguin Books (AUS)
- Publication date: 1987
- Publication place: Australia
- Media type: Print (Paperback)
- Pages: 248
- ISBN: 978-0-14-032231-6
- OCLC: 27491110
- Followed by: The Farseekers

Obernewtyn is the first novel in the Obernewtyn Chronicles series by Australian author Isobelle Carmody. Carmody began writing it at the age of fourteen, and reworked the novel through high school and university. Much of the inspiration for the protagonist, Elspeth Gordie, comes from her own life experiences. It was published by Penguin Books in Australia in 1987 and shortlisted for the Book of the Year for Older Readers in the Children's Book Council of Australia Awards.

A science fiction-fantasy novel set in a post-apocalyptic world, the story follows Elspeth Gordie, an orphan with special mental abilities, who lives a life of fear and danger. When her abilities are brought to the attention of the ruling, totalitarian Council, she is banished to the remote mountain institution of Obernewtyn, where all "Misfits" are sent. The leaders of Obernewtyn are secretly searching for the old weapons that had sent the world to the brink of despair, and Elspeth finds herself embroiled in a plot that risks more than just her personal safety.

The book has been published in Australia, the United Kingdom, the United States of America, Germany and Portugal. The Library Journal stated it was a "thought-provoking tale of courage and sacrifice"; other reviews found it one-dimensional and difficult to follow. Adapted as a stage play by Caroline Heske, it was performed in Darwin, Australia in 2004 by the Corrugated Iron Youth Arts Theatre.

== Composition ==
Isobelle Carmody began writing the book when she was fourteen, in 1972. She rewrote and developed it throughout high school and university. After briefly working as a journalist, she left to write full-time. Penguin Books agreed to publish the book when Carmody submitted the manuscript in her early twenties and it was published in 1987. Carmody has said that the character and life experiences of Elspeth reflect her own:

As a girl, I felt myself to be a Misfit. I was the eldest of eight children and I grew up in this tough neighbourhood where there were kids that beat up odd kids like me who read and wrote stories. I longed not to fit in and be like the other kids, but to find people who were like me. And of course like probably every kid, though I did not know that then, I longed to have something important to do. I longed to be special. I think this is the natural result of the powerlessness of children in a world of adults that don’t always seem to be looking after the world all that well.

— Isobelle Carmody, 2008

The author named The Chronicles of Narnia, The Lord of the Rings, Doctor Dolittle and books about Pippi Longstocking as sources of influence.

== Synopsis ==
=== Context ===
Obernewtyn is set in a world recently ravaged by a nuclear holocaust, known to the survivors as "the Great White", later said by the Herders (leaders of the new religious order) to have been sent by Lud (God) to punish humanity. The surviving remote communities attempted to rebuild society, which over time developed into a totalitarian Council, and a religious order, the Herder Faction. Mutations of the mind also began to appear in some of the surviving generations; those discovered are either burnt alive along with the rebels or labelled as "Misfits" and outcasts. The resulting large group of children are placed in orphan homes and used for manual labour.

I dream of those other worlds and places where life is enchantingly complicated, more honourable, and where there is still room for noble deeds and great quests; a world in which even a Misfit might become a hero.

— Isobelle Carmody, Obernewtyn, Penguin Books 1994, back cover

=== Voice and setting ===
The story is told in the first-person through the protagonist, Elspeth Gordie, a teenage girl who has secret mental powers such as telepathy and the ability to communicate with animals. The story begins at Kinraide orphan home, where she and her brother Jes live, before moving briefly through Sutrium, the capital, and the countryside. However the majority of the narrative is set at Obernewtyn, which lies in the northern mountains of the Land, the fictional nation in which the Obernewtyn Chronicles is set.

=== Plot ===
Elspeth learns from her premonitions, and her cat Maruman's prophecies, that a keeper from Obernewtyn, a feared institution where Misfits are sent to work, will come to take her there. Soon, when delivering tea to visiting Head Keeper of Obernewtyn, Madam Vega, Elspeth accidentally reveals she is a Misfit, though not to what extent, and is soon dispatched to Obernewtyn. Her first few weeks at Obernewtyn are spent in the kitchen, where she is worked to the bone. The cook's daughter delights in tormenting her. The favoured Misfit, Ariel, and farm overseer, Rushton, immediately dislike her. Later reassigned to the farm, an encounter with a pair of Misfits named Matthew and Dameon reveals she is not alone in her particular abilities. She also befriends Cameo, a delicate, pretty Misfit of whom Matthew is very fond. Elspeth, plagued by nightmares, begins to feel there is a dark secret underneath their everyday tasks. While working, Elspeth decides to test the range of her telepathic ability, "farseeking", but beyond the boundaries of Obernewtyn, a strange machine, the Zebkrahn, traps her mind. She is only freed by combining her mental strength with another anonymous mind who offers assistance. Asked by Vega to look out for "special" Misfits, her interview reveals the Doctor is a defective simpleton; his "assistant", Alexi, has no interest in Elspeth in his quest to find the "right one" who will lead him to what he desires. Elspeth and Matthew later deduce that tortuous experiments on their kind are occurring, and they resolve to escape. Cameo begins disappearing from her bed at nighttime, and Elspeth fearfully suspects that Cameo is the subject of some of these experiments.

That night, Elspeth sneaks into the Doctor's office to retrieve a map and compass, but on finding forbidden books and maps from before the Great White, the "Beforetime", she realises they must be searching for something from long ago. She leaves empty-handed. Rosamunde, a fellow orphan from the Kinraide orphan home, arrives at Obernewtyn and coldly informs Elspeth that her brother Jes had discovered he also had mental abilities, but was killed by guards in an escape attempt. Rushton comforts the distraught Elspeth, and asks her why she plagues him. Fearful that someone will soon be after her as well, her group's escape plans begin in earnest. Elspeth returns a second time to the Doctor's office, but when Vega, Alexi and Ariel enter, she learns Ariel is part of the Obernewtyn family, and that they are searching for a Misfit to help them find the location of Beforetime weapons. Pre-warned that two Councilmen are coming to fetch her for questioning by the Herders, at nightfall she makes to escape but Rushton stops her. He reveals a secret network of drains which gets her safely to the farms. Once she is safely through the drains after a close shave with Ariel's pack of mad, wild wolves, she finds that the path to the farms has been obscured by a blizzard and gets lost. She nearly dies, but a Misfit named Domick finds her and locks her in the farmhouse to return later to Obernewtyn. Overhearing a conversation between her captors, she discovers they are Rushton's accomplices and were to secretly meet with a rebel group, but Rushton has gone missing. Convincing them that her powers can help find him, she makes her way on foot through the blizzard to the far mountains, with Maruman as her guide.

Inside the cave network she finds a dying Cameo, who tells her the Beforetime weapons Alexi and Vega are searching for caused the Great White, but they do not know this. She also reveals it is Elspeth's destiny, as the Seeker, to destroy them. After mourning her death, Elspeth overhears that Rushton, imprisoned in the next cavern, is the true heir of Obernewtyn. Suddenly, she is captured by Ariel, who ties her to a table next to the Zebkrahn machine. Elspeth is forced to hold the diaries of Marisa Seraphim, the wife of the founder of Obernewtyn and Alexi's stepmother, and use her abilities to discover what Marisa was thinking when she wrote them to determine the weapons' location. Still withstanding the torture, Elspeth mentally enters Rushton's mind and recognises the voice of her earlier rescuer from the Zebkrahn. Rushton gives his mental strength to her to endure the pain inflicted on her by the machine. In her despair at their threats to kill him, her resistance breaks and Marissa's thoughts reveal the map to be carved into the front doors of Obernewtyn. At this point, the Zebkrahn overheats and bursts into flames. Something in Elspeth's mind cracks and she uses this new power to kill Vega, who she saw standing over Rushton with a knife. She falls unconscious as Domick and Rushton's other friends rush in. Alexi is killed, but Ariel flees into the night and is believed to have died in the blizzard. Now known to be the legal master of Obernewtyn, Rushton plans to build it into a secret refuge for Misfits.

== Reception ==
=== Critical ===
On the whole, Obernewtyn has been positively received. A reviewer for Publishers Weekly called it "a promising new series" and stated that Carmody evades stereotyping by imbuing her characters with conflicting interests. The Library Journal stated that it is a "thought-provoking tale of courage and sacrifice".

Lloyd Alexander, an American fantasy author, commented that it is a fantastically imaginative novel. He cited intricate detail, in-depth character development, and skilled use of language as some of the strengths of the work. American Young Adult fantasy writer Tamora Pierce expressed that the novel is "a dream date for [her]", given the novel involves a courageous girl of many talents and animals with "minds of their own".

However some reviewers have criticised aspects of the book. A reviewer writing for Kirkus Reviews said that the novel is "pedestrian and one-dimensional". Victoria Strauss, of SF Site, felt the emotional detachment of Elspeth, despite her loss and grief, robs the novel of some of its impact. John Foster felt Obernewtyn is hard to follow due to the complexities of the language and plot.

=== Awards and nominations ===
Obernewtyn won the Marcus Clark Literary Award for Best Unpublished Manuscript, which subsequently saw Carmody receive an Australia Council of the Arts Writer's Grant.

In 1988, Obernewtyn was shortlisted for Book of the Year for Older Readers in the Children's Book Council of Australia Awards.

== Publication history ==
Single Book Publications:

Year	Country	Publisher	Media type	Cover Designer	Pages	ISBN
1987	AUS	Puffin Books	Paperback	Geoff Kelly; Cathy van Ee	248	0-14-032231-0
1993	AUS	Puffin Books	Paperback	Connel Lee; Ann Wojczuk	264	9780140178548
1994	UK	Point SF	Paperback	David Scutt	321	0-590-55494-8
1994	AUS	Penguin Books	Paperback	Miles Lowrey, Ellie Exarchos	248	0-140-34769-0
1999	US	Tor Books	Hardcover	Donato Giancola	253	0-312-86958-4
2000	US	Tor Books	Paperback	Donato Giancola	246	0-812-58422-8
2003	US	Starscape	Paperback	Tristan Elwell	246	0-765-34267-7
2007	AUS	Penguin Books	Paperback	Les Petersen	245	9780140178548
2008	US	Random House	Paperback	Les Petersen	244	9780375857676
2008	US	Random House	eBook	Les Petersen	256	9780375857676
2008	Portugal	Bertrand Editora	Paperback	-	276	9789722517478
2010	UK	Bloomsbury Publishing	Paperback	Les Petersen	256	9781408806975
2010	AUS	Penguin Books (Popular Penguins)	Paperback	Eric Gill; Jan Tschichold; Edward Young	264	9780143204787
2011	UK	Bloomsbury Children's Books (UK)	eBook	-	256	9781408811689
2011	Canada	ReadHowYouWant.com Ltd	Paperback (Large Print)	-	350	9781459620698
2014	AUS	Penguin Books (Pink Popular Penguins)	Paperback	-	264	9780734311214

Combined Volumes:

Year	Country	Title	Publisher	Media type	Cover Designer	Pages	ISBN
2000	US	Obernewtyn & The Farseekers	Science Fiction Book Club	Hardcover	Judy York	440	0-7394-1211-6
2002	AUS	The Obernewtyn Chronicles (Books 1–3)	Penguin Books	Paperback	Miles Lowrey	1078	9780734305022
2011	US	The Seeker (Book 1&2)	Bluefire	Paperback, eBook	Les Petersen	544	9780375871139, 9780307974341

=== Foreign language publications ===
Year	Publisher	Title	Media type	Language	Translator	Pages	ISBN
2008	Bertrand Editora	Elspeth–a Senhora do Pensamento ("Elspeth - Lady of Thought")	Paperback	Portuguese	Ana Neto	276	9789722517478
2015	Papierverzierer Verlag	Obernewtyn	Paperback	German	Judith C. Vogt	295	9783944544328

=== Audiobooks ===
Year	Publisher	Title	Narrator	Media type	ISBN/OCLC
1988	Louis Braille Productions	Obernewtyn	Diana Greentree	Cassette	9780732002015
1989	Royal Blind Society	Obernewtyn	Mary Haire	Cassette, Compact Disc	OCLC 220811098
2016	Bolinda Publishing Pty Ltd	The Obernewtyn Chronicles #1: Obernewtyn	Isobelle Carmody	Compact Disc, MP3	9781489342676, 9781489342683

== Adaptations ==
The Corrugated Iron Youth Arts Theatre in Darwin, Australia, produced Caroline Heske's stage play adaptation of Obernewtyn, directed by Jeremy Rice, at the Brown's Mart Theatre from 3 to 7 November 2004. Rice stated that the original novel has "that imaginative streak that suits theatre".
