= The Gathering (Carmody novel) =

Novel by Isobelle Carmody

- Cover
- Author: Isobelle Carmody
- Language: English
- Genre: Fantasy novel
- Publisher: Puffin Books
- Publication date: 1993
- Publication place: Australia
- Media type: Print (hardback & paperback) and audiobook (cassette)
- Pages: 266
- ISBN: 0-14-036059-X (hardcover)
- OCLC: 32150390
- LC Class: PZ7.C2176 Gat 1993

The Gathering is an allegorical 1993 Australian young adults' novel written by fantasy author Isobelle Carmody. The book was published by Puffin Books Australia in 1993, The Gathering has sold over 70 000 copies in Australia and New Zealand alone. The book was a joint recipient of the 1993 Children's Peace Literature Award and was also named Book of the Year in 1994 by the Children's Book Council of Australia. In 1994, the novel was also integrated into the literature curriculum for the junior years of Secondary Education in the Australian state of Victoria.

== Development ==
In 1987, Carmody began writing her epic fantasy series, the Obernewtyn Chronicles, set in a post-apocalyptic realm of social disarray. While her principal focus still remains on society, in many forms, The Gathering was the first of her novels to be set in a time and place that exist in reality (early '90s Australia), an approach that immediately gives it a stark realism. Another unusual technique used in the book is that of an author narrating their story from the perspective of a member of the opposite gender (see the Tomorrow series, by John Marsden). There were no wide criticisms of her choice to do so; the voice of Nathanial was not targeted as being inauthentic. These two basic writing techniques set The Gathering apart from almost any of Carmody's other work.

== Plot summary ==
The novel is narrated by Nathanial Delaney, a teenage boy with a self-confessed Hamlet complex and social ineptitude, which can be credited to his lack of a stable environment; he and his mother have been moving frequently since the divorce of his parents. Their most recent home is the seaside town of Cheshunt, an apparently quiet community that Nathanial immediately dislikes, citing the town's bitter wind and abattoir stench as the primary reasons. His resentment causes tension between him and his mother, and their relationship becomes more strained as the story goes on.

Many themes are portrayed in this novel including good vs evil, inner struggle, human nature, conformity vs individuality, friendship and cooperation.

Nathanial soon discovers that there is more to dislike about the town than the smell. The school, Three North High, is victimised by its brutish student patrol, which is under the orders of the vice principal. Mr Karle "invites" Nathanial to join the school's youth group, The Gathering. He believes strongly in cooperation, and hence does not encourage individualism. Nathanial declines to join The Gathering, which becomes an issue with the school patrol.

While walking his dog one night, Nathanial accidentally stumbles on a meeting of a group of three students from Three North: Danny Odin, Indian Mahoney and Nissa Jerome. A fourth member is not present, a school prefect, Seth Paul. The group are known as The Chain, and they tell Nathanial they have been brought together by the "forces of light" to fight a deep evil in Cheshunt, an evil headed by Mr Karle (whom they refer to as "The Kraken"). When Nathanial is caught and questioned by The Chain, they are all informed by the group's prophetic guide, Lallie, that Nathanial is the final of the chosen members of their clan and his arrival heralds the beginning of their battle.

Throughout the novel Nathanial overcomes his cynicism and begins seeing signs of The Dark everywhere, most centrally in the past; in studying the history of Cheshunt he uncovers many parallels between his situation and past events. Throughout the story, he also gradually learns that his fellow members have deep personal demons, and his role in The Chain and the Binding of the Dark becomes clear in the final chapters, where the grand showdown between The Dark and The Light takes place.

== Awards and nominations ==
- Joint winner – Children's Peace Literature Award: Best Book (1993)
- Won – CBCA Children's Book of the Year Award: Older Readers (1994)
- Shortlisted – NSW 3M Talking Book Award (1994)
- Second place – Western Australia Young Readers Book Award (1994)
- Shortlisted – Kids Own Australia Literature Award (1995)
- Shortlisted – Young Australian Best Book Award (1994)

== Film, TV or theatrical adaptations ==
Plans to adapt The Gathering to screen began circulating as far back as 1997, when Sullivan Entertainment picked up the idea. In 2001, the Variety website posted an article stating that the film adaptation of The Gathering, to be titled "New Haven", was to be part of a three-film production plan for the then newly created film division of Sullivan Entertainment. Despite speculation and rumours amongst fans, no news has been reported since, and the project status is unknown.

== Release details ==
- 1993, Australia, Puffin Books Aust. ISBN 0-14-036059-X, Pub date 1993, paperback (First edition)
- 1994, Australia, Puffin Books Aust. ISBN 0-14-036059-X, Pub date 15 April 1994, paperback
- 1994, Australia, Dial Books for Young Readers ISBN 0-8037-1716-4, Pub date ? June 1994, hardback
- 1999, USA, Bolinda Audio ISBN 1-74030-058-0, Pub date 31 December 1999, audio cassette (narrated by Peter Hardy )
- 2001, UK, Barn Owl Books ISBN 1-903015-09-X, Pub date 1 April 2001, paperback
