= Drones and Phantoms =

2014 poetry collection by Jennifer Maiden

- Author: Jennifer Maiden
- Language: English
- Genre: Poetry collection
- Publisher: Giramondo Publishing
- Publication date: October 2014
- Publication place: Australia
- Media type: Print
- Pages: 80 pp.
- Awards: 2015 ALS Gold Medal winner
- ISBN: 9781922146724
- Preceded by: The Violence of Waiting
- Followed by: The Fox Petition

Drones and Phantoms is a collection of poems by Jennifer Maiden, published by Giramondo Publishing in 2014.

The collection contains 31 poems, some of which are published here for the first time.

== Contents ==
- "Diary Poem: Uses of Live Odds"
- "Offshore"
- "Diary Poem : Uses of Cosiness"
- "The Day of Atonement"
- "Drones and Phantoms"
- "Diary Poem Uses of Ethiopia"
- "Digging for Hoffa"
- "Hilary and Eleanor 10: The Coppice"
- "'So That's Who Those Motorbikes Were'"
- "'I've done this wrongly before'"
- "The Reflection"
- "Victoria and Tony 1: A Useful Fan"
- "Victoria and Tony 2: The Backburn"
- "Victoria and Tony 3: Woods and Feathers"
- "Victoria and Tony 4 : The Minimal Monarch"
- "Diary Poem: Uses of Judith Wright"
- "The Sweet Shop Gone"
- "Diary Poem: Uses of Frank O'Hara"
- "Getting Anne Back"
- "George Jeffreys 15: The Fourth Terrace"
- "George Jeffreys 16: George Jeffreys Woke Up in South Iceland"
- "Tanya and Jane"
- "Diary Poem: Uses of the Politician's Wife"
- "White Cyclamen"
- "Economy"
- "The Live Grey Cell"
- "Diary Poem: Uses of Sparrows"
- "Diary Poem: Uses of Dismemberment"
- "Something Rotten"
- "Clare and Manus"
- "Maps in the Mind"
- "Diary Poem : Uses of Silence"
- "My Heart Has a Deep Water Harbour"
- "In Proportion"

== Critical reception ==
Writing in The Australian Book Review reviewer Toby Fitch noted: "Her umbrella themes – politics, power, evil, the public and private selves, war, and the role of art – are back. The title is a beautiful droning of her past work – 'But the problem of evil drums: rhythm / and the drug of immediacy' – and has a brutal currency, given US drones are coming and going from Middle Eastern airspace, silently yet violently, like phantoms...One of Maiden's primary objectives is to confront the reader's conventional expectations of his or her own ethics...While uncomfortable, Maiden's mode is also a 'relaxed comic mode', as Martin Duwell once wrote, in which she ventriloquises living and dead historical figures and politicians, pairing them off in conversations so as to present opposing attitudes and anxieties. In this way Maiden can play devil's advocate and empathiser, and tease out the complexities and ethical ambiguities of world events in private, fanciful reckonings."

In the Cordite Poetry review David McCooey stated: "Maiden's vigorous response to these poetic risks has been to programmatically, and often comically, confuse basic literary distinctions, especially those between poetry and journalism, realism and fantasy, and confession and fiction. The poems in Drones and Phantoms, as in her previous three collections with Giramondo Publishing, traverse all of these realms across classes of poems recognisable to readers of Maiden: 'Diary Poems', fantastic dialogues, and the discontinuous 'George Jeffreys' series...To write 'elegiac journalism' is to link the intimately personal with the impersonally public. Maiden’s project, it seems, is to insert intimacy into those distances (countries, detention centres, wars) to which the news draws attention, while denying intimacy with the human subjects to be found in those distant places. As Maiden’s poems show, those subjects also range across great social distances, from asylum seekers and the poor, to politicians and celebrities, and they share a strangely distant intimacy in the virtual space called the media."

== Publication history ==
After the collection's initial publication by Giramondo Publishing in 2014 it has not been reprinted.

== Awards ==
- 2015 ALS Gold Medal, winner

== See also ==
- 2014 in Australian literature
