= Alyzon Whitestarr =

2005 novel by Isobelle Carmody

- Alyzon Whitestarr first edition cover.
- Author: Isobelle Carmody
- Cover artist: Miles Lowry
- Language: English
- Genre: Young adult
- Publisher: Penguin Books
- Publication date: 26 September 2005
- Publication place: Australia
- Media type: Print (Paperback)
- Pages: 604 pp (first edition)
- ISBN: 0-14-300243-0

Alyzon Whitestarr is a 2005 young adult novel by Isobelle Carmody.

== Background ==
Alyzon Whitestarr was first published in Australia on 26 September 2005 by Penguin Books in trade paperback format. It was released by Random House in the United States in 2005. Alyzon Whitestarr won the 2005 Aurealis Award for best young-adult novel and the 2005 Golden Aurealis for best novel.

== Synopsis ==
Alyzon Whitestarr does not take after her musically talented father or her nocturnal, artistic mother. She considers herself to be the most normal member of a very eccentric family until an accident changes that.

When she wakes from a coma after an accident, colours are more vibrant. Her memory becomes greatly enhanced; but strangest of all is her sense of smell. She can smell people's feelings, view flashes of their lives and perceive their essences. With these new senses she discovers that some people's spirits have been infected by a sentient disease.

With Alyzon's extrasensory perception comes intrigue and danger, as she becomes aware of the dark secrets and hidden ambitions that threaten her family. In the end, being different might be less of a blessing than a curse.
