= Dog Fox Field =

1990 poetry collection by Les Murray

- Author: Les Murray
- Language: English
- Genre: Poetry collection
- Publisher: Angus and Robertson
- Publication date: 1990
- Publication place: Australia
- Media type: Print
- Pages: 103 pp.
- Awards: 1991 Grace Leven Prize for Poetry, winner
- ISBN: 0207168938

Dog Fox Field is a collection of poems by Australian poet Les Murray, published by Angus and Robertson in Australia in 1990.

The collection contains 70 poems from a variety of sources.

The collection won the 1991 Grace Leven Prize for Poetry.

== Contents ==
- "The Transposition of Clermont"
- "Feb"
- "March : Masculeene, Cried the Bulls"
- "April : the Idyll Wheel"
- "The Liberated Plague"
- "Two Rains"
- "To the Soviet Americans"
- "Low Down Sandcastle Blues"
- "Preface"
- "The Emerald Dove"
- "Cave Divers Near Mount Gambier"
- "The Tin Wash Dish"
- "The Inverse Transports"
- "The Billions"
- "The Narrabri Reservation"
- "The Up-to-Date Scarecrow (for Melissa Gordon)"
- "The Cows on Killing Day"
- "The Pole Barns"
- "The 1812 Overture at Topkapi Saray"
- "From the Other Hemisphere"
- "Glaze"
- "Farmer at Fifty"
- "The Tube (for Ann Moyal and Rob Crawford)"
- "Shale Country"
- "Barrenjoey"
- "The International Terminal"
- "Granite Country"
- "The Ocean Baths"
- "Three Last Stanzas"
- "Mirror-Glass Skyscrapers"
- "The Lieutenant of Horse Artillery"
- "Dog Fox Field"
- "Hastings River Cruise (I.M. Ruth and Harry Liston, D. Port Macquarie 1826)"
- "Gun-e-Darr"
- "Words of the Glassblowers"
- "High Sugar"
- "Spotted Native Cat"
- "Levities of the Short Giant"
- "On Removing Spiderweb"
- "The Assimilation of Background"
- "Araucaria Bidwilli"
- "Spring"
- "The Import of Adult Flavours"
- "Accordion [Accordeon] Music"
- "Experiential"
- "The Greenhouse Vanity"
- "An Australian History of the Practical Man"
- "Slip"
- "Aircraft Stressed-Skin Blowout Mid-Pacific (United Airlines Flight 811, 1989)"
- "In Murray's Dictionary"
- "Ariel"
- "Politics and Art"
- "Major Sparrfelt's Trajectory : Oland, Southern Baltic, 1 June 1676"
- "A Torturer's Apprenticeship"
- "The Ballad of the Barbed Wire Ocean"
- "Midnight Lake"
- "Spitfire Roundel"
- "Antarctica"
- "Distinguo"
- "The Past Ever Present"
- "Like the Joy at His First Lie"
- "The House of Worth"
- "Blue Roan"
- "The Road Toll"
- "An Era"
- "The Gaelic Long Tunes"
- "Wagtail"
- "Sandstone Country"
- "Manners of the Supranation"
- "High River (for the Marriage of Brian and Mary Davis)"

== Critical reception ==
In a review of the collection for Australian Book Review Julian Croft noted that with this work "you can see Murray drawing in the threads of the past few years, consolidating and expounding an idiosyncratic apologia for poetry and this poet’s life and lifestyle."

Judith Wright in The Sydney Morning Herald wrote that this collection "cries out for a wide readership. Murray fulfills the true role of a poet, capturing a moment, an echo, a movement in the most intense form known to literature."

== Awards ==
- 1990 Grace Leven Prize for Poetry, winner

== Notes ==
- Blake Morrision interviewed the poet about his collection, and other things, for The Age newspaper.

== See also ==
- 1990 in Australian literature
