= Mines (poetry collection) =

1999 poetry collection by Jennifer Maiden

- Author: Jennifer Maiden
- Language: English
- Genre: Poetry collection
- Publisher: Paper Bark Press
- Publication date: 1999
- Publication place: Australia
- Media type: Print
- Pages: 104 pp.
- Awards: 2000 NSW Premier's Prize for Poetry, winner
- ISBN: 9057040468

Mines is a collection of poems by Australian poet Jennifer Maiden, published by Paper Bark Press in 1999.

The collection contains 40 poems from a variety of sources, with some published here for the first time.

The collection won the 2000 NSW Premier's Prize for Poetry.

== Contents ==
- "Foreword: Night Drive"
- "Look, I'm standing on no-floor"
- "Fairy-Bread"
- "Trick Ending"
- "The Nubian Spoon"
- "Can We Drive Into the Monster, Jenny?"
- "The Orient Queen"
- "Moonstone"
- "Girlfight at the Penrith Show"
- "The Garnet in Rose Gold"
- "Pain Poe"
- "Sea of Nectar, Seething Bay, Sea of Moisture, Marsh of Decay, Sea of Ingenuity, Lake of Death, Sea of Crises, Bay of Dew, Sea of Tranquility, Serpent Sea, Sea of Fertility, Border Sea"
- "The Case of the Pharaoh's Penis"
- "And He's Got Daisy Mae"
- "Diane Beamer Poem"
- "Lapis"
- "For Its Own Sake"
- "Beast on Ice"
- "Dove on Ice"
- "The Lord of Shalott"
- "Should I Call It Small Ornaments"
- "Rose Moon"
- "Jagungal"
- "Estella"
- "White Christmas Tree"
- "The Potted Palm in the Al-Rashid Hotel Foyer"
- "Menopause as a Bee Freed from a Fairy Floss Machine"
- "The Squadron"
- "Lady's Chair"
- "Still Life: Jack-in-the-Box with Moonstones"
- "The Case of the Dalmatian Diamond"
- "Three Poems at the Thirteenth Pillar : The White Fiat (First Version)"
- "Three Poems at the Thirteenth Pillar : The White Fiat (Another Version)"
- "Three Poems at the Thirteenth Pillar : The Chauffeur (One Version)"
- "Afterword : Mines"
- "The Butler"
- "Evening Emerald : Desert Fox, December, 1998"
- "Madeleine Albright Wears Two Lapel Pins"
- "Madeleine Albright is Not in the Picture"
- "It Might Well Be a Bright Yellow Explosive, Might Well Be a Branch of Blossoms Or It Might Well Be Madeleine Albright"

== Critical reception ==
Pam Brown, reviewing this collection in The Age newspaper found many depths in the poems: "Precious jewels and humbler sequins shimmer alchemically in many poems, and a bee trapped and then set free from a fairy floss machine at Australia's Wonderland can be transformed into a liberating menopausal symbol in Maiden's complex world-view."

== See also ==
- 1999 in Australian literature

== Notes ==
- Dedication: To my daughter Katharine Margot, my husband David, my mother and the memory of my father.
- Ali Gripper interviewed the poet for The Sydney Morning Herald about the collection, and her other work

== Awards ==
- 2000 NSW Premier's Prize for Poetry.
