= The Winter Baby =

1990 poetry collection by Jennifer Maiden

- Author: Jennifer Maiden
- Language: English
- Genre: Poetry collection
- Publisher: Angus and Robertson
- Publication date: 1990
- Publication place: Australia
- Media type: Print
- Pages: 64 pp.
- Awards: 1991 Victorian Premier's Prize for Poetry, winner; 1991 NSW Premier's Prize for Poetry, winner
- ISBN: 0207165831

The Winter Baby is a collection of poems by Australian poet Jennifer Maiden, published by Angus and Robertson in 1990.

The collection contains 41 poems.

The collection won the 1991 Victorian Premier's Prize for Poetry, and the 1991 NSW Premier's Prize for Poetry.

== Contents ==
- "Overproof"
- "Safe"
- "Sherlock Holmes"
- "For Schools"
- "The Nun as Director"
- "The Lady at the Party"
- "The Window as an Epigram"
- "Poem on an AIDS Commercial"
- "Respiration"
- "Off the Cuff"
- "The Membrane"
- "Gladiolus"
- "Need"
- "Contemporary References"
- "A Summer Emotion"
- "The Ballroom"
- Psalms sequence
  - "Psalm"
  - "Second Psalm"
  - "Third Psalm"
  - "Fourth Psalm"
  - "Fifth Psalm"
  - "Sixth Psalm"
- "The Midwife"
- "The Winter Baby"
- "This Purring Room"
- "The Rocker"
- "Doing Beautifully"
- "Vulnerability"
- "Nature Program"
- "Nursery Rhymes"
- "Edges"
- "Food"
- "In the Caesura"
- "The Process"
- "First Birthday"
- "Observation"
- "Memo"
- "Nose"
- "First Tea Set"
- "Christmas Poem, 1987"
- "'Bye'"

== Critical reception ==
In the Australian Book Review Simon Patton noted Maiden's ability to give mundane subjects a degree of depth and complexity: "Most poems in this collection are extremely tentative in the sense that, for Maiden, poetry is not the polished expression of thought-out meanings but a process of discovery. She often begins with the mundane, breaking up familiar phrases and bringing in chance ideas, building up a magnetic momentum in which insights accumulate until something sparks and the poem flares with a significance that is both irresistibly powerful and beautifully complex."

== See also ==
- 1990 in Australian literature

== Notes ==
- Dedication: To my daughter Katharine Margot, my husband David, my mother and the memory of my father.

== Awards ==
- 1991 Victorian Premier's Prize for Poetry
- 1991 NSW Premier's Prize for Poetry
