= Liquid Nitrogen (poetry collection) =

2012 poetry collection by Jennifer Maiden

- Author: Jennifer Maiden
- Language: English
- Genre: Poetry collection
- Publisher: Giramondo Publishing
- Publication date: 2012
- Publication place: Australia
- Media type: Print
- Pages: 86 pp.
- Awards: 2014 Victorian Premier's Literary Awards – Victorian Prize for Literature, winner
- ISBN: 9781920882990

Liquid Nitrogen is a collection of poems by Australian poet Jennifer Maiden, published by Giramondo Publishing in 2012.

The collection contains 21 poems.

The collection won the 2014 Victorian Premier's Literary Awards – Victorian Prize for Poetry, and the Victorian Premier's Literary Awards – Victorian Prize for Literature. It was shortlisted for the Griffin International Poetry Prize

== Contents ==
- "The Year of the Ox"
- "Sphinx on Stilts"
- "Coal"
- "A Great Education"
- "Poor Petal"
- "Liquid Nitrogen"
- "George Jeffreys 13 : George Jeffreys Woke up in Beijing"
- "George Jeffreys 14 : George Jeffreys Woke Up in Sharm el Sheikh"
- "Emerald-Cut"
- "Hillary and Eleanor 8 : The Audience"
- "Hillary and Eleanor 9 : The Pearl Roundabout"
- "In the International Pavilion"
- "Deep River"
- "Diary Poem: Uses of Liquid Nitrogen"
- "Diary Poem : Uses of the Civil War"
- "Diary Poem : Uses of Powerlessness"
- "Sydney Confidential"
- "Circling the High Notes"
- "Carina"
- "My Heart Has an Embassy"
- "Well Inside Fireground"

== Critical reception ==
Writing in Australian Book Review Kate Middleton noted that "Jennifer Maiden has for a long time been one of Australia's most politically engaged poets" and went on to comment that "Her political engagement results in poetry that feels necessary, as if it might just matter."

In Sydney Review of Books Gig Ryan also noted on the political aspect of the poems: "Liquid Nitrogen scans a media-embossed politics, unrolling theories amid dailiness, and preserves a mind ceaselessly in action, armed and complete with its 'machine of memories'."

== See also ==
- 2012 in Australian literature

== Notes ==
- Dedication: For Katharine Margot

== Awards ==
- 2014 Victorian Premier's Literary Awards – Victorian Prize for Poetry
- 2014 Victorian Premier's Literary Awards – Victorian Prize for Literature
- 2013 Prime Minister's Literary Awards – Poetry, shortlisted
- 2013 Griffin International Poetry Prize Shortlist
