= Darkfall (Carmody novel) =

1997 novel by Isobelle Carmody

- Second edition cover
- Author: Isobelle Carmody
- Cover artist: Janet Woolley
- Language: English
- Series: Legendsong Saga
- Genre: Fantasy, science fiction, parallel universe, high fantasy
- Publisher: Viking Australia
- Publication date: 1997
- Publication place: Australia
- Media type: Print (Paperback)
- Pages: 555
- ISBN: 9780670866489
- OCLC: 38415549
- Followed by: Darksong

Darkfall is the first novel in the Legendsong Saga series by Australian author Isobelle Carmody. Carmody wrote the first drafts for all three books in the trilogy concurrently whilst living in Prague. It was published by Viking Books in Australia in 1997 and shortlisted for 'Best Fantasy Novel' at the 1998 Aurealis Awards and for 'Australian Long Fiction' at the 1998 Ditmar Awards.

This parallel-universe, high-fantasy novel is set primarily in the world of Keltor.

The book has also been published in braille and in Chinese.

== Composition ==
Carmody wrote the first draft for Darkfall and its sequels Darksong and Darkbane at the same time. These were written whilst the author was living in Prague, Czech Republic. Carmody took a year to write the first draft of Darkfall and another four years to revise and rewrite the novel.

The author has commented that she writes the books as they come to her, without a particular target audience in mind. It was for her publisher to decide which market, children or adult, the books were best suited. Much of the novel's grappling with both the beauty and evil in the world come from her own reflections and experiences.

Carmody has also drawn from aspects of classical mythology in the work, including myrmidons, from the warriors of the same name who accompanied Achilles, and sylphs, whom she calls silfi.

== Plot summary ==
=== Legendsong ===
Underlining the plot of the book is the Legendsong of Keltor. This legend states that long ago, the Firstmade (Unykorn) of Keltor was captured by the Chaos spirit so that Lanalor could be with his first love, Shenavyre, who had committed suicide when the Unykorn was imprisoned. Lanalor prophesied that an Unraveller would come to rescue the Unykorn and free Keltor from the Chaos spirit, and told the signs by which the Unraveller would be recognised. It is this prophecy that Darkfall protects, and that which the Draaka cult seeks to prove untrue.

=== Main story ===
Glynn and Ember Flanders, fraternal twin sisters, are holidaying in Greece when Glynn is seemingly swept out to sea and drowned. Glynn finds herself transported to the world of Keltor and rescued from the sea by an Acanthan windwalker, Solen. Feigning amnesia, she gradually deciphers this new world where some can fly and others see prophetic visions. As she lives with Solen on Acantha and works in the mine, she learns the independent Isle of Darkfall and its once esteemed sisterhood of soulweavers are falling from favour with the rulers of Keltor, and that Solen is far more involved in the world’s politics than he tries to appear. Unfortunately, with her athletic build and independence, Glynn is often mistaken as a myrmidon, the Amazon-like women who are the sworn protectors of the soulweavers.

Unbeknownst to Glynn, Ember, who is dying of brain cancer and half blind, is also transported to Keltor in her attempt to save Glynn from drowning. She is rescued by a kiss from the manbeast Ronaall, seemingly in a vision. The Soulweaver Alene and her myrmidon protectors Feyt and Tareed find her, who privately suspect Ember is the long-awaited "Unraveller", given her strong physical similarity to Shenavyre and the prophecy. Ember, now amnesiac, very gradually begins to remember her past as she lives with them in the palace on Ramidan.

Meanwhile, Glynn is desperate to reach Darkfall to return home to her sister, particularly after the apparent death of Solen. To gain coin to pay for the ship fare, Glynn attempts to sell a rare stone to the leader of the anti-Darkfall cult run by the Draaka. Instead, Glynn is drugged and enslaved until a Draaka leader, Bayard, assigns her to academic work after her pet, the fienna, forms a special attachment to Glynn. Glynn is to ensure the fienna successfully gives birth to its rare offspring. Meanwhile, Glynn adopts the persona of a Fomikan who had worked on an aspi breeder’s farm, lest she be discovered as a stranger to Keltor.

Through a vision, Ember saves the Holder's (the King) life from an assassination attempt by Coralyn, his mother, who wants to put her other son, Kalide, on the throne. Bleyd, the son of an Isle leader, is framed and tortured. After a successful rescue attempt, Ember and Bleyd are smuggled onto a ship heading to Darkfall where Ember hopes to find healing from her worsening brain tumour. Alene gives her own a’luwtha (a stringed instrument) as a gift, which helps Embers unlock her memory.

Meanwhile, Glynn travels with the Draaka cult to the island of Ramidan. In a violent storm, Bayard falls overboard and drowns while Glynn helps the fienna give birth. Solen assists her, after revealing his existence to Glynn. The dying mother fienna gives Glynn special abilities to save its last offspring by creating a special connection between Glynn, the baby fienna and partially with Solen. Solen and Glynn also reveal their strong love for one another. As the ship pulls into the harbour, she is unknowingly watching Ember's ship departing.

=== Segue chapters ===
Throughout the novel, the plot is broken up by stories of people observed by the Watcher back in our world in the same relative time. All are connected with Glynn and Ember in some way, and somehow with Keltor. These include stories of Faye and Tabby; a male nurse who cares for a comatose man who also cared for Ember; a clarinet player and his comatose mother; a security guard; a policeman named Johnny; and a jogger who found Wind's suicide note.

== Voice and setting ==
The story is told in the third-person through the protagonists, Glynn and Ember Flanders. These Australian twin sisters are drawn separately through the portal from Earth to the world of Keltor and the plot follows their parallel journeys. The narrative alternates every few chapters between each sister's events and perspective.

The story begins briefly in Greece on Earth, where the sisters are holidaying. The majority of the narrative is set in Keltor, a small pre-development alternate world of seven islands.

== Themes ==
A significant part of the intricacy of the plot is Carmody's detailed consideration of religion, philosophy and politics.

You are born with the yearning arrow, my Glynna, though you are not yet fully aware of it. It is not a happy thing to possess, for nothing on earth — no goal, no person however beloved — will answer it. It points to the sky and to the heavens and the stars and when it cannot reach them, it must fall back to pierce your heart.

— Isobelle Carmody, Darkfall, Penguin Books 1998

Darkfall also contemplates the duality between the beauty (the Song) and evil (the Chaos Spirit) in the world. Carmody commented in an interview that she "lives in one of the most beautiful places on earth doing what [she] love[s] doing and getting paid for it and in the same world there are people who are getting shot, who are starving, who are suffering tragedies, kids dies because some brute bashes them. There is this terrible unease in me". She states she "is interested in the finer spark of human beings...[as] the thing that makes us at our best is almost always dark, difficult and painful". This duality is also matched with the symbiotic relationship between our world and Keltor, where events in one affect the other.

The novel also considers finding meaning and purpose in life. Even before the two protagonists are swept into Keltor, the sisters felt adrift. Ember is dying and believes she has lost the ability to feel emotion; Glynn, while attentive to her sister's needs, lacks her own sense of worth. Additionally, it is revealed that Glynn's boyfriend, Wind, committed suicide some years earlier after struggling with depression and feelings of emptiness.

== Reception ==
=== Critical ===
Darkfall has been well received by critics. Eidolon Magazine describes the work as “outstanding in its evocation and control of an invented world and society” and that “her narration presents with equal precision the menace and emotional isolation that threaten her typical victim-heroes”. The Age portray it as a "dramatic narrative [with] vivid characters on an enormous canvas”. InCite praises the work and calls it a "testament to Carmody’s depthless imagination”. She goes on to say that Carmody has avoided the “hackneyed clichés and absolutes common in fantasy novels" and that it "offers believable heroines in a landscape of moral ambiguity”. Magpies magazine says that the “huge cast of characters, events and the intricacies of religion, philosophy and politics keeps readers thinking and puzzling over each chapter”.

In the analysis of Foster, Finnis and Nimon, they describe the work as “high fantasy at one level, but on another... a work of social realism, a combination with a variety of different quests and unlikely... heroes”. They also point out the feminist cast of the work, given the protagonists and most of the antagonists are female.

However one common criticism is that the work is too confusing, given the intricacy and format of the plot. One reviewer calls for a character list at the beginning of the book to keep track of the “large array of characters and settings…deployed”. She also comments that the novel is unlikely to convert anyone to the fantasy genre as it is “discursive and sprawling, a travelogue”. Another reviewer calls the writing “often rotten” and the dialogue “wooden”. Others have criticised the book design itself; from its “brick-like” size to the fact the design of the first edition cover appears to display the author’s name as “Isobelle Darkfall Carmody”.

=== Awards and nominations ===
Darkfall was shortlisted in the 1998 Aurealis Awards for "Best Fantasy Novel" and in the 1998 Ditmar Awards for "Australian Long Fiction".

== Publication history ==
=== Main publications ===
Year	Title	Country	Publisher	Media type	Cover Artist	Pages	ISBN
1997	Darkfall	Australia	Viking Books Australia	Paperback	Janet Woolley	555	9780670866489
1998	Darkfall: Book One of the Legendsong	Australia	Penguin Books (AUS)	Paperback	Janet Woolley	598	9780140278484
1998	Darkfall: Book One of the Legendsong	Australia	Penguin eBooks	E-book	-	616	9781742283883

=== Special-needs publications ===
Year	Title	Country	Publisher	Narrator	Media type	Media format	Pages
1999	Darkfall	Australia	Louis Braille Audio	Caroline Lee	Audiobook	Cassette	-
2006	Darkfall	Australia	Vision Australia Information and Library Service	Caroline Lee	Audiobook	DAISY Digital Talking Book	-
2011	Darkfall	Australia	Vision Australia Information and Library Service	-	Print	Braille	-

=== Foreign-language publications ===
In 2008, a Chinese translation was published by Sichuan Literature and Art Publishing House Pub. D, entitled 沦落, Volume 1 (Lúnluò = Darkfall). It was translated by 邱望生.

== Trilogy ==
Darkfall was written as the first entry into the Legendsong Saga, a proposed trilogy of novels. The second novel, Darksong, was published by Viking books in 2002, and Penguin in 2003. A third entry in the series, Darkbane, is planned and in April 2025 Carmody wrote in her blog that she hoped to have a full draft completed by the year's end. Allen and Unwin is to publish the third entry alongside republished editions of the first two novels.

== Notes ==
1.The cover illustration is a detail from a painting by American artist Janet Woolley entitled Last Supper. Carmody has commented that she hopes the second half of the painting will be the cover of the forthcoming third and final novel, Darkbane.
