= Ashling =

1995 novel by Isobelle Carmody

- Second Edition Penguin Cover
- Author: Isobelle Carmody
- Language: English
- Series: Obernewtyn Chronicles
- Genre: Fantasy, Science fiction, Post-apocalyptic fiction
- Publisher: Penguin Books
- Publication date: February 1995
- Publication place: Australia
- Media type: Print (paperback)
- Pages: 521
- ISBN: 978-0-670-85357-1
- Preceded by: The Farseekers
- Followed by: The Keeping Place

Ashling is the third book in the Obernewtyn series by Isobelle Carmody.

== Synopsis ==
The powerful Misfit Elspeth is sent to Sutrium, the seat of the ruling totalitarian Council, to seal an alliance between the secret community at Obernewtyn and the rebel forces. Yet her journey takes her far beyond the borders of the Land, across the sea into the heart of the mysterious desert region, Sador. There she seeks help to destroy the weaponmachines but before her dark quest can begin, she must learn the truth of her dream: why the Beforetimers destroyed their world...

== Reception ==
=== Awards and nominations ===
In 1996, Ashling was shortlisted for "Young Adult Novel" in the Aurealis Award.

== Publication history ==
Single Book Publications:

Year	Country	Publisher	Media type	Cover Designer	Pages	ISBN
1995	AUS	Viking Books	Paperback	Connell Lee	521	9780670853571
1996	UK	Puffin Books	Paperback	Connell Lee	521	9780140368246
1997	AUS	Penguin Books	Paperback	Miles Lowrey, Ellie Exarchos	522	0-14-027151-1
2001	US	Tor Books	Hardcover	Donato Giancola	428	0-312-86956-8
2002	US	Tor Books	Paperback	Donato Giancola	467	0-812-58424-4
2003	US	Starscape	Paperback	Tristan Elwell	467	0-765-34622-2
2007	AUS	Penguin Books	Paperback	Les Petersen	524	9780140271515
2008	US	Random House	Paperback	Les Petersen	496	9780375857690
2011	UK	Bloomsbury Publishing	Paperback	Les Petersen	544	9781408806968

Combined Volumes:

Year	Country	Title	Publisher	Media type	Cover Designer	Pages	ISBN
2002	AUS	The Obernewtyn Chronicles (Books 1-3)	Penguin Books	Paperback	Miles Lowrey	1078	9780734305022
2012	US	The Dreamtrails (Book 3&4)	Bluefire	Paperback	Les Petersen	928	9780307932198
