= The Stone Key =

2008 novel by Isobelle Carmody

- The Stone Key first edition cover.
- Author: Isobelle Carmody
- Cover artist: Les Petersen, Getty Images
- Language: English
- Series: Obernewtyn Chronicles
- Genre: Fantasy, science fiction, young adult
- Publisher: Viking Children's Books
- Publication date: 4 February 2008
- Publication place: Australia
- Pages: 1000
- ISBN: 978-0-670-07134-0
- OCLC: 225756476
- LC Class: PZ7.C2176 St 2008
- Preceded by: The Keeping Place
- Followed by: The Sending

The Stone Key is a 2008 science fiction novel by Isobelle Carmody, set in a post apocalyptic world. It is the fifth book in the Obernewtyn Chronicles.

== Background ==
Wavesong cover

The Stone Key was first published in Australia on 4 February 2008 by Viking Children's Books in trade paperback format. In the United States it has been separated into two books, entitled Wavesong and The Stone Key respectively.

The Stone Key was a short-list nominee for the 2008 Aurealis Award for best young-adult novel but lost to Finnikin of the Rock by Melina Marchetta.

== Synopsis ==
When Elspeth sets out from Obernewtyn to Sutrium to testify at the trial of a rebel traitor, she quickly learns not everyone has welcomed the changes caused by the rebellion. Confronted with an invasion, Elsepth finds herself on what she considers her strangest and most dangerous journey yet. Drawn into the heart of the Herder Faction, she learns of the terrible plot to destroy the west coast. To stop it, Elspeth takes copious risks, since if she dies, she will never be able to complete her quest to destroy the weapon machines which wiped out the Beforetime; but if she succeeds, it might just bring her to the final clue needed to find them...

== Reception ==
A reviewer for the Canberra Times noted: "Freedom, Carmody suggests, is messy and in some ways harder to live with than totalitarian rule...Her heroes and heroines are utterly implacable in their refusal to compromise their morals: they are filled with a profound respect for all life, treating animals as their intellectual equals and steadfastly refusing to participate in any activity that will cause harm to another living creature." They concluded: "The Stone Key appeals to the type of teenager who reads literature for consolation, to enter a world where people are better, where their actions matter, where the adolescent search for identity and a place in the world can be tied up with a quest to save humanity...Despite this, they remain utterly human, inspiring empathy and driving a compelling plot."

== Awards and nominations ==
In 2008, The Stone Key was shortlisted for "Young Adult Novel" in the Aurealis Awards.

== Publication history ==
Single Book Publications:

Year	Country	Publisher	Media type	Cover Designer	Pages	ISBN
2008	AUS	Penguin Books	Paperback	Les Petersen	1000	9780670071340

Split Books:

Year	Country	Title	Publisher	Media type	Cover Designer	Pages	ISBN
2008	US	Wavesong	Random House	Paperback	Les Petersen	467	9780375857713
2011	UK	Wavesong	Bloomsbury Publishing	Paperback	Les Petersen	480	9781408806944
2008	US	The Stone Key	Random House	Paperback	Les Petersen	483	9780375857720
2011	UK	The Stone Key	Bloomsbury Publishing	Paperback	Les Petersen	576	9781408806951
