= The Keeping Place =

1999 novel by Isobelle Carmody

- Second Edition Penguin Cover
- Author: Isobelle Carmody
- Language: English
- Series: Obernewtyn Chronicles
- Genre: Fantasy, science fiction, post-apocalyptic fiction
- Publisher: Viking Press Australia
- Publication date: 1999
- Publication place: Australia
- Media type: Print (paperback)
- Pages: 754
- ISBN: 0-14-029579-8
- OCLC: 48607283
- Preceded by: Ashling
- Followed by: The Stone Key

The Keeping Place is a science fiction novel by Australian writer Isobelle Carmody, set in a post-apocalyptic world. It is the fourth book in the Obernewtyn Chronicles.

== Synopsis ==
After a kidnapping, the Misfit community at Obernewtyn is forced to join the rebellion against the totalitarian Council, using their extraordinary mental abilities. Yet Elspeth must also seek out clues left by a long-dead seer, Kasanda, necessary to her quest to destroy the Beforetime weapon machines. When one is hidden in the past, Elspeth must travel the Dreamtrails, stalked by a terrifying beast, with Maruman, her cat, as guide and protector. Only now can she learn more about the Beforetime Misfits and their enemy, Govamen, and realise her quest is intimately linked with the Misfit's Obernewtyn - its past and its future.

== Plot ==
The Misfits at Obernewtyn are all experiencing dreams and nightmares in which they are terrorized by a dragon, Dragon's form on the Dreamtrails. Dragon herself remains in a comatose state and is unable to be reached mentally by the healers. Her strong aura causes all around her in Obernewtyn to experience nightmares.

Rushton, Master of Obernewtyn and Elspeth's betrothed, is kidnapped while returning from a meeting with the rebels in Sutrium. The Misfits receive a letter disclosing that Rushton will lose his life if the Misfits do not join the rebellion. They immediately believe that a rebel has kidnapped their Master as Rushton had refused letting the Misfits join the rebellion.

With Rushton missing, and under Elspeth's command, the Misfits join the rebellion, offering limited aid. However, they are betrayed by the Misfit-hating rebel, Malik in a decoy scheme involving soldierguards, leading to significant loss of life for beasts, Misfits and soldierguards alike. This bloodshed would have been greater if it weren't for Swallow, a pureblood gypsy recently appointed as D'rekta, 'King' of the Twentyfamily gypsies.

On the east coast of the land, the rebellion is successful without trouble from the Landfolk. The west coast, however, remains occupied by the Council after a traitor spreads news of the rebellion to the Herder Faction. The Misfits had not been able to identify the traitor, most likely because he or she wore a demon band, a tainted band made by the Herders to ward off evil that also blocks Misfits' mental probes.

While freeing prisoners in one of the abandoned Herder cloisters in Sutrium, the Misfits find Rushton. While not physically harmed, he is heavily drugged and suffering from delirium and convulsions.

After returning to Obernewtyn with the unconscious Rushton, Elspeth travels to the City under Tor to witness for herself the discovery of a glass monument made by Cassy, a Beforetimer, who Elspeth had encountered in multiple dreams. The glass monument is of Elspeth herself, who believes that Cassy must have had futuretelling abilities.

Elspeth later returns to Obernewtyn to find herself summoned onto the Dreamtrails by the oldOnes. Elspeth enters Dragon's mind, with Maruman, having been told by the latter that they would find Rushton there. Elspeth learns about Dragon's fateful past, and realizes that the cause of her delirium lies in the loss of her beloved Mother, the Red Queen. Inside Dragon's mind, Elspeth encounters and saves Rushton, who is in the form of a wounded bear.

After she leaves Dragon's mind, Dragon is awakened from her coma but has no recollection of her life at Obernewtyn. Rushton recovers from his soul-less state, buy his recovery will be lengthy. Elspeth now knows that she must continue her quest for the five signs left for her by the Beforetimer, Kasanda.

== Publication history ==
Single Book Publications:

Year	Country	Publisher	Media type	Cover Designer	Pages	ISBN
1999	AUS	Penguin Books	Paperback	Miles Lowrey, Ellie Exarchos	754	0-14-029579-8
2007	AUS	Penguin Books	Paperback	Les Petersen	754	9780140295795
2008	US	Random House	Paperback	Les Petersen	553	9780375857706
2011	UK	Bloomsbury Publishing	Paperback	Les Petersen	768	9781408806999

Combined Volumes:

Year	Country	Title	Publisher	Media type	Cover Designer	Pages	ISBN
2012	US	The Dreamtrails (Book 3&4)	Bluefire	Paperback	Les Petersen	928	9780307932198
