= The Sending =

2011 novel by Isobelle Carmody

- Australian Edition Cover
- Author: Isobelle Carmody
- Language: English
- Series: Obernewtyn Chronicles
- Genre: Fantasy, Science fiction novel, Post-apocalyptic novel
- Publisher: Penguin Books (AUS) Random House (US) Bloomsbury Publishing (UK)
- Publication date: 31 October 2011
- Publication place: Australia
- Media type: Print (paperback)
- Pages: 768
- ISBN: 978-0-670-85359-5
- Preceded by: The Stone Key
- Followed by: The Red Queen

The Sending is the seventh novel in the Obernewtyn Chronicles by Australian author Isobelle Carmody, and is the penultimate book in the series. It was originally intended to be the final book, but this was changed to allow Carmody to elaborate plot strands without it becoming too long. The book follows the journey of Elspeth as she is finally called to set out on her fated quest to destroy the computermachines before they unleash a second apocalypse. The book was published in Australia and the United States on 31 October 2011, and was released in the United Kingdom in July 2012.

== Composition ==
Originally the book was intended to be the last book in the series, with American publisher Random House to publish it in two volumes, the other being called The Red Queen. However it was announced in December 2010 that it would become the penultimate novel, with The Red Queen to be the final book. Carmody stated that the reason behind this decision was that the one volume was far too long, and such a split allowed her to elaborate on plot strands she had had to cut down.

Carmody announced on 27 March 2011 that the book was officially finished. The book was released on 31 October 2011 in Australia.

== Synopsis ==
In a world where happiness and love are rare, Elspeth Gordie has found both. But in the midst of planning a trip to the Red Land, Elspeth at last receives her summons to leave the Land on her quest to stop the computermachine Sentinel from unleashing a second apocalypse. Though she has prepared for this day for years, nothing is as she imagined. She will go far from her destination to those she thought lost forever. To toxic Blacklands to find a pack of mutant human-hating wolves, for only they can lead her to the forgotten Beforetime city which haunts her dreams. Accepting her mission will cost her dearly, but to refuse, or to fail, is to condemn the world to annihilation.

== Publicity Tour ==
In promotion of the book, Carmody held book signings, and lectures at schools, through November 2011, at various points across Australia.

== Publication history ==
Single Book Publications:

Year	Country	Publisher	Media type	Cover Designer	Pages	ISBN
2011	AUS	Penguin Books	Paperback	Les Petersen	755	9780670853595
2013	AUS	Penguin Books	Ebook	Les Petersen	704	9781742534213
2013	AUS	Penguin Books	"A Format" Paperback	Les Petersen	768	9780143567479

Split Books:

Year	Country	Title	Publisher	Media type	Cover Designer	Pages	ISBN
2013 (forthcoming)	US	The Sending	Random House	Paperback	Les Petersen	480	9780375857737
forthcoming	UK	The Sending	Bloomsbury Publishing	Paperback	Les Petersen		9781408817308
forthcoming	US	The Red Queen	Random House	Paperback	Les Petersen		
forthcoming	UK	The Red Queen	Bloomsbury Publishing	Paperback	Les Petersen		
