= The Farseekers =

1990 novel by Isobelle Carmody

- 2007 edition cover
- Author: Isobelle Carmody
- Language: English
- Series: Obernewtyn Chronicles
- Genre: Fantasy, Science fiction novel
- Publisher: Viking Books
- Publication date: 1990
- Publication place: Australia
- Media type: Print (Paperback)
- Pages: 326
- ISBN: 0-670-83768-7
- OCLC: 59898380
- Preceded by: Obernewtyn
- Followed by: Ashling

The Farseekers is the second novel in the Obernewtyn Chronicles series by Isobelle Carmody. It was first published by Penguin Books in Australia in 1990. In 1991, it was selected as an Honour Book for "Book of the Year for Older Readers" in the Children's Book Council of Australia Awards.

Two years on from the conclusion of Obernewtyn, the story follows the now thriving secret community of misfits at Obernewtyn. An expedition sets out to both rescue a powerful Misfit in a distant part of the Land and a lost library, but only Elspeth, its leader, knows how much is at stake. A dangerous journey, the group much succeed and return to Obernewtyn before the pass closes. In the midst of all this, Elspeth learns of her destiny to find and destroy the weaponmachines which caused the Great White.

Internationally published, in the United Kingdom, the United States of America, and Portugal, the novel has received positive reviews. The Library Journal stated that it "blends graceful storytelling with appealing characters" and Publishers Weekly indicates it is "better than its predecessor"; criticisms include its lack of intricate character development and its complexity.

== Summary ==
=== Context ===
Two years on from where Obernewtyn ended, Obernewtyn is thriving as a secret community for Misfits. Rushton is now the legal owner of the site, spreading the rumour Obernewtyn had been destroyed in a firestorm (deadly storm of flames). The community is separated into six guilds: Healing, Futuretelling (those who can see the future), Coercing (those who can force others to think or act differently), Beasting (those who can communicate with animals), Farseeking (those with the ability to send out a mental probe) and Teknoguild (study of the time before the Great White, particularly machines). Each guild has a guildmaster/mistress, a guilden (2IC), and warden (3IC). Elspeth is guildmistress of the Farseekers. The front doors which contained the map of the weaponmachines have been destroyed.

=== Voice and setting ===
The novel is written in the first-person and is based around a journey made to the lower lands. Beginning at Obernewtyn, they travel through the White Valley to the Druid's Camp, then through Tor mountain to Rangorn. They then travel on to the major city of Aborium, and then on to the Beforetime ruin. Returning home, they go back to Rangorn and through the secret pass over Tor. Elspeth is flown to the Agyllian eyrie before travelling through the mountains back to Obernewtyn.

=== Plot ===
Rushton returns from a journey around the highlands and immediately calls a meeting of all the leaders of the guilds (guildmerge). At the meeting, Elspeth and Pavo propose a joint expedition of their guilds to the West Coast, in order to recover an untouched Beforetime (time before Great White) book cache, as well as rescue a person with very strong mental abilities. Rushton proposes a safe house be set up in the capital, Sutrium, so they can be informed of the Council's movements, with the person to do this joining their expedition. This expedition is unanimously approved. Suddenly the cat Maruman falls into a fitful coma and Elspeth enters his mind to help bring him back. Inside his mind, a voice of an Agyllian reminds Elspeth of her promise to destroy the weaponmachines, a journey she must make alone. Later, Zarak bumps into an unknown Misfit mind while farseeking, who is a novice Herder in Darthnor cloister. Elspeth contacts the novice, named Jik, who initially believes she is a demon sent to test his faith. After subsequent conversations, she reveals she too is a Misfit and offers him a home at Obernewtyn. A small group of Farseekers rescue him, making it look as if he had drowned. Meanwhile, Elspeth, in response to the horses’ refusal to be ridden, strikes a bargain with their leader, Gahltha, that the upcoming expedition be treated as a test as to whether they can work as equals. He agrees on the condition that only Elspeth rides him, as both parties should risk their leaders. Just before the expedition sets off, a prophecy reveals Jik must join them and they must be back before the pass closes in winter, or Obernewtyn will fall.

Disguised as a gypsy troop, they attempt to find a secret pass through the lower mountains, but are taken captive by armsmen of Henry Druid (infamous rebel leader). Inside the well-established camp, their mental abilities are suddenly constrained and the group are separated. After being questioned by Druid about Obernewtyn, Kella and Elspeth are invited to dinner with the men in order to arrange bonding (marriage) of them to some armsmen. The head armsmen, Gilbert, takes a liking to her and speaks at length of his life and the camp. Later, Elspeth finds a secret group of Misfits led by Druid's secret deaf daughter and learns the block on their abilities is caused by a Misfit baby. Elspeth and Kella, intended to be bonded that night, escape with the rest of the group during a large storm. Dominic, who had eluded capture, built large rafts at Elspeth's earlier request, on which the group escape their pursuers into the mountain rapids. Halfway down, they come across a ruined Beforetime city in a large cavern. After exiting the mountain via a large waterfall, they are nursed back to health by a rebel couple. In return, the group agree to go to Aborium to see if their son, Brydda, is fine. Domick leaves them to travel to Sutrium to set up the safe house. In Aborium, Elspeth asks for him at the specified inn but is taken prisoner instead. Rescued by one of Brydda's friends, she is taken to see him. Meanwhile, Kella, Jik and Pavo are taken captive by the Herders and are held in the local cloister. Realising Jik is an escaped novice, the Herders intend to send him to Herder Isle (island containing core of order) that night for interrogation. Elspeth breaks in and frees the other two, but she is too late to free Jik. With Brydda's help they are able to cause enough commotion on the wharf to rescue him.

Outside the city, they, with Brydda, travel north to their destination, the ruins containing the library. The ruins are deserted as they are believed to be haunted. The group find a wild girl, capable of causing horrific visions with her mind, and discover that she is the Misfit they seek. After being coaxed with food, the girl, dubbed ‘Dragon’, eventually follows them back and joins their group. They also take back many books from the Beforetime library. After returning to Brydda's parents house, Domick rushes in to warn them of the approaching soldierguards, and tells them that Ariel is alive. Fleeing, Brydda reveals the secret pass through the mountains, which the group safely traverse with Jik's dog's directions. However, on emerging from the other side, a firestorm bears down on them. Although Elspeth is dragged to safety by Daffyd, someone she met many years earlier, Jik perishes in the flames. Elspeth convinces Daffyd to take the others back to Obernewtyn before the pass closes, as the mental barrier blocking the pain in her badly injured feet caused by the Zebrakhen had collapsed. Alone and dying, Elspeth is taken by Guannette birds (Agyllians) to the highest mountain where they teach her body to heal itself. The leader, Atthis, who spoke to her earlier in Maruman's mind, reminds her of her quest, and the existence of the Destroyer who is destined to try and use the weaponmachines. After taking months to heal, Elspeth is returned to the wintery highlands where Gahltha awaits her to take her back to Obernewtyn. There Elspeth sees a ruin, destroyed by a firestorm, and a soldierguard camp set up nearby with Rushton and others captive inside. She meets Daffyd, who reveals that the ruins are a vision caused by Dragon to fool soldierguards, who soon flee in fear of catching a deadly disease. The others, who had presumed her dead, are mystified and overjoyed at her arrival, particularly Rushton.

== Reception ==
=== Critical ===
Overall, The Farseekers has been very positively received. The Library Journal states that it "blends graceful storytelling with appealing characters", and Publishers Weekly indicates that there are "engaging characters, pacing and plots" and that it is "better than its predecessor". Liz Manning of the Youth Services Book Review feels "the plot is exciting, filled with twists and turns and unexpected pitfalls". Kirkus Reviews describes it as "competently wrought but earnest and familiar" as a young-adult novel.

Review Stream states the book is "darker than the last" and "a cautionary tale to encourage [environmental] awareness".

Marie Soriano of the National Center for the Study of Children's Literature feels it is a "well-written page turner" but that is misses the intricate character development present in Obernewtyn which had emotionally endeared the character to the reader. Some state that the wash of new information is sometimes overwhelming.

=== Awards and nominations ===
In 1991, The Farseekers was an Honour Book for "Book of the Year for Older Readers" in the Children's Book Council of Australia Awards.

== Publication history ==
Single Book Publications:

Year	Country	Publisher	Media type	Cover designer	Pages	ISBN
1990	AUS	Viking Books	Paperback	Connell Lee	326	0-670-83768-7
1993	AUS	Puffin Books	Paperback	Connell Lee	326	0-14-034770-4
1994	UK	Point SF	Paperback	David Scutt	407	0-590-55495-6
1994	AUS	Penguin Books	Paperback	Miles Lowrey, Ellie Exarchos	324	9780140134056
2000	US	Tor Books	Hardcover	Donato Giancola	316	0-312-86957-6
2001	US	Tor Books	Paperback	Donato Giancola	316	0-812-58423-6
2003	US	Starscape	Paperback	Tristan Elwell	316	0-765-34271-5
2007	AUS	Penguin Books	Paperback	Les Petersen	312	9780140134056
2008	US	Random House	Paperback	Les Petersen	309	9780375857683
2008	US	Random House Books for Young Readers	Hardcover	Les Petersen	320	9780375957680
2008	US	Random House	E-book	Les Petersen	320	9780375857683
2009	Portugal	Bertrand Editora	Paperback	-	336	9789722518246
2010	UK	Bloomsbury Publishing	Paperback	Les Petersen	320	9781408806982

Combined Volumes:

Year	Country	Title	Publisher	Media type	Cover designer	Pages	ISBN
2000	US	Obernewtyn & The Farseekers	Science Fiction Book Club	Hardcover	Judy York	440	0-7394-1211-6
2002	AUS	The Obernewtyn Chronicles (Books 1-3)	Penguin Books	Paperback	Miles Lowrey	1078	9780734305022
2011	US	The Seeker (Book 1&2)	Bluefire	Paperback	Les Petersen	544	9780375871139

=== Foreign language publications ===
In 2009, a Portuguese edition was published in Portugal by Bertrand Editora entitled ' Elspeth - Os Libertadores do Pensamento ' (translated by Ana Neto). This roughly translate to 'Elspeth - The Liberators of Thought'.

=== Audiobooks ===
In 1991, the Royal Blind Society (NSW) produced an audio recording of The Farseekers on cassette, narrated by Christine Jeffery.
