= Isobelle Carmody =

Australian writer

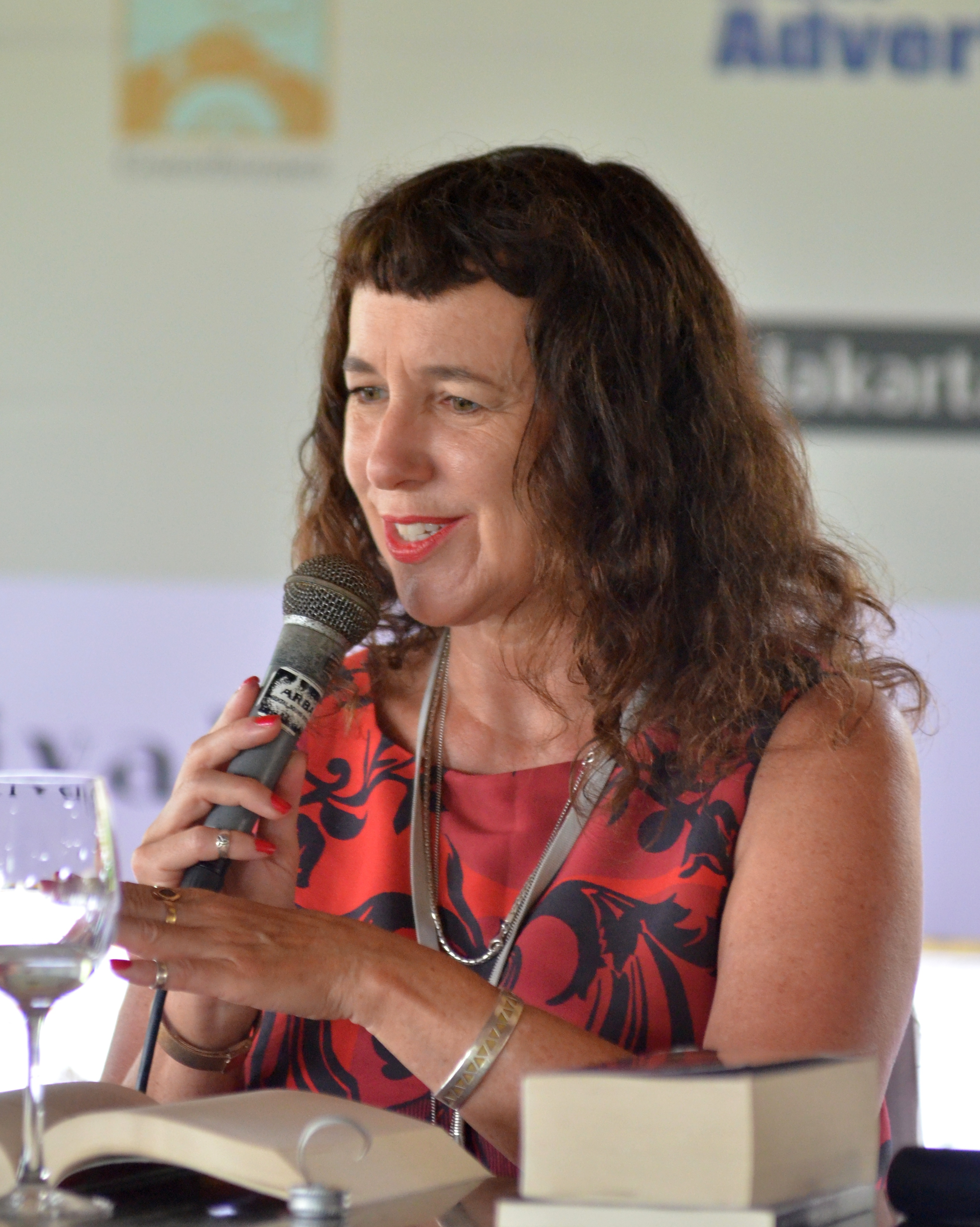
- Carmody at a writing event in 2012
- Born: Isobelle Jane Carmody; 16 June 1958 (age 68); Wangaratta, Victoria, Australia
- Occupation: Novelist
- Writing career
- Genres: Fantasy; Science fiction Young adult literature
- Notable work: Obernewtyn Chronicles
- Website: isobellecarmody.net.au

Isobelle Jane Carmody (born 16 June 1958) is an Australian writer of science fiction, fantasy, children's literature, and young adult literature. She is recipient of the Aurealis Award for best children's fiction.

== Biography ==
Isobelle Carmody was born in Wangaratta on 16 June 1958, the eldest of eight children. She began work on Obernewtyn Chronicles at the age of fourteen. This was soon after the death of her father in a traffic accident. She continued to work on them while completing a Bachelor of Arts, majoring in literature and philosophy; she worked in public relations and journalism.

Obernewtyn, her first novel and the first book in the Obernewtyn series, was published in 1987.

She was Guest of Honour at the 2007 Australian National Science Fiction Convention, Convergence 2, held in Melbourne in June 2007.

== Personal ==
Her partner is Jan Stolba, a Czech musician and poet. She currently divides her time between her home on the Great Ocean Road in Victoria, and her travels abroad with her partner and daughter, spending a year each in her two residences.

== Books ==
| Date first published | Title | Publisher information | Series | Notes |
|---|---|---|---|---|
| 1987 | Obernewtyn | Penguin Books, paperback, ISBN 978-0-14-032231-6 | Obernewtyn Chronicles – Book 1 | Shortlisted for 1988 Children's Book of the Year for Older Readers |
| 1990 | The Farseekers | Penguin Books, paperback, ISBN 0-670-83768-7 | Obernewtyn Chronicles – Book 2 | Honour book for 1991 Children's Book of the Year for Older Readers |
| 1991 | Scatterlings | ISBN 978-0-59-055905-8 | none | |
| 1 June 1993 | The Gathering | Puffin Books, paperback, ISBN 978-0-14-036059-2 | none | |
| February 1995 | Ashling | Penguin Books, paperback, ISBN 978-0-670-85357-1 | Obernewtyn Chronicles – Book 3 | Shortlisted for 1996 Aurealis Award for Best Young-Adult Novel |
| 1996 | Green Monkey Dreams | | none | Short story collection (see below) |
| 1 September 1997 | Greylands | Puffin Books, paperback, ISBN 0-14-038749-8 | none | Won the 1998 Aurealis Award for best young-adult novel |
| 1997 | Darkfall | Penguin Books, paperback, ISBN 978-0-670-86648-9 | Legendsong Saga – Book 1 | Shortlisted 1998 Aurealis Award for Best Fantasy, shortlisted Ditmar Award for Best Long Fiction |
| 1998 | This Way Out: Five Plays | | none | With Steve Taylor |
| 1999 | The Keeping Place | Penguin Books, paperback, ISBN 0-14-029579-8 | Obernewtyn Chronicles – Book 4 | |
| 2000 | Billy Thunder and the Night Gate | Penguin Books, paperback, ISBN 978-0-14-130098-6 | Gateway Trilogy – Book 1 | Also published as Night Gate |
| 2002 | Darksong | Penguin Books, paperback, ISBN 978-0-14-300162-1 | Legendsong Saga – Book 2 | |
| 29 September 2003 | The Winter Door | Penguin Books, paperback, ISBN 978-0-14-130096-2 | Gateway Trilogy – Book 2 | Also published as Winter Door |
| 2004 | Angel Fever | Lothian Books, paperback, ISBN 978-0-73-440689-7 | Quentaris Chronicles | |
| 2005 | The Cat Dreamer | Lothian Books, paperback, ISBN 978-0-73-440762-7 | Quentaris Chronicles | |
| 26 September 2005 | Alyzon Whitestarr | Penguin Books, paperback, ISBN 0-14-300243-0 | none | Won the 2005 Aurealis Award for best young-adult novel and the 2005 Golden Aurealis for best novel |
| 2005 | Little Fur | Puffin Books, paperback, ISBN 978-0-14-330072-4 | The Legend of Little Fur – Book 1 | |
| 2006 | A Fox Called Sorrow | Puffin Books, paperback, ISBN 978-0-14-330073-1 | The Legend of Little Fur – Book 2 | |
| 2007 | A Mystery of Wolves | Puffin Books, paperback, ISBN 978-0-14-330075-5 | The Legend of Little Fur – Book 3 | |
| 4 February 2008 | The Stone Key | Penguin Books, paperback, ISBN 978-0-14-300943-6 | Obernewtyn Chronicles – Book 5 | Published as two books, Wavesong & The Stone Key, in UK, Canada and US |
| 1 November 2008 | A Riddle of Green | Puffin Books, paperback, ISBN 978-0-14-350493-1 | The Legend of Little Fur – Book 4 | |
| 2010 | The Red Wind | Puffin Books, paperback, ISBN 978-0-14-330686-3 | The Kingdom of the Lost – Book 1 | |
| 31 October 2011 | The Sending | Penguin Books, paperback, ISBN 978-0-67-085359-5 | Obernewtyn Chronicles – Book 6 | |
| 24 April 2013 | The Cloud Road | Puffin Books, paperback, ISBN 978-0-67-007518-8 | The Kingdom of the Lost – Book 2 | |
| 12 November 2015 | The Red Queen | Penguin Books, paperback, ISBN 978-0-67-007640-6 | Obernewtyn Chronicles – Book 7 | |
| 3 July 2017 | The Ice Maze | Viking, hardback, ISBN 978-0-67-007791-5 | The Kingdom of the Lost – Book 3 | |
| 29 October 2024 | Comes the Night | A&U Children's, paperback, ISBN 978-1-76-029476-2 | none | Shortlisted CBCA Book of the Year, Older Readers, 2025. Shortlisted John Marsden Book of the Year for Older Children, Australian Book Industry Awards, 2025. Shortlisted Indie Young Adult Book Awards, 2025 |
| Forthcoming | Darkbane | | Legendsong Saga – Book 3 | |
| Forthcoming | Firecat's Dream | | Gateway Trilogy – Book 3 | |
| Forthcoming | The Velvet City | | The Kingdom of the Lost – Book 4 | |

Short stories
| Collection | Title | Date first published | Notes |
|---|---|---|---|
| After Dark | The Red Shoes | 1996 | pub. 2000 |
| After Dark | The Landlord | 2000 | pub. 2000 |
| Dark House | A Splinter of Darkness | 1995 | ed. Gary Crew |
| Dream Weavers | The Keystone | 1996 | ed. Paul Collins |
| Dreaming Again | Perchance to Dream | 2008 | ed. Jack Dann |
| Dreaming Down-Under | The Man Who Lost His Shadow | 1998 | ed. Jack Dann, Janeen Webb |
| Exotic Gothic | The Stranger | 2009 | ed. Danel Olson |
| Exotic Gothic | Metro Winds | 2012 | ed. Danel Olson |
| Gathering the Bones | The Dove Game | 2003 | ed. Ramsey Campbell, Jack Dann, Dennis Etchison |
| Green Monkey Dreams | Corfu | 1985 | pub. 1996 |
| Green Monkey Dreams | The Witch Seed | 1992 | pub. 1996 |
| Green Monkey Dreams | Seek No More | 1992 | pub. 1996 |
| Green Monkey Dreams | The Pumpkin Eater | 1994 | pub. 1996 |
| Green Monkey Dreams | The Monster Game | 1994 | pub. 1996 |
| Green Monkey Dreams | Green Monkey Dreams | 1995 | pub. 1996 |
| Green Monkey Dreams | The Phoenix | 1996 | pub. 1996 |
| Green Monkey Dreams | The Glory Days | 1996 | pub. 1996 |
| Green Monkey Dreams | The Beast | 1996 | pub. 1996 |
| Green Monkey Dreams | The Lemming Factor | 1996 | pub. 1996 |
| Green Monkey Dreams | The Red Shoes | 1996 | pub. 1996 |
| Into the Future | Roaches | 1991 | ed. Toss Gascoigne, Jo Goodman, Margot Tyrrell |
| Kids' Night in 2 | Santorini | 2005 | ed. Jessica Adams et al. |
| Legends of Australian Fantasy | The Dark Road: An Obernewtyn Story | | ed. Jack Dann, Jonathan Strahan |
| The Lottery: Nine Science Fiction Stories | Long Live the Giant! | 1994 | ed. Lucy Sussex |
| The Road to Camelot | Guinevere, or the Sleeping of Beauty | 2002 | ed. Sophie Masson |
| Trust Me Too | The Journey | 2012 | |
| Under My Hat | The Stone Witch | 2012 | |

=== Picture books ===
- Journey From the Centre of the Earth (2003), illustrated by Marc McBride
- Wildheart (2002), illustrated by Steven Woolman
- Dreamwalker (2000), a story in graphic novel form, illustrated by Steven Woolman
- The Wrong Thing (2006), illustrated by Declan Lee (rewritten for the US/Canada and published as Magic Night)
- Night School (2010), illustrated by Anne Spudvilas
- Evermore (2015), illustrated by Daniel Reed

== Awards ==
2025 - Children's Book Council of Australia Awards

- Older Readers Book of the Year: shortlisted for Comes the Night

2011 – Children's Book Council of Australia Awards

- Younger Readers Book of the Year: winner for The Red Wind

2008 – Aurealis Awards

- Young Adult Novel: Shortlisted for The Stone Key

2007 – Aurealis Awards

- Children's Novel: shortlisted for A Fox Called Sorrow

2006 – ABPA Book Design Awards

- Fiction: winner for Little Fur: the Legend of Little Fur

2006 – Aurealis Awards

- Golden Aurealis novel: winner for Alyzon Whitestarr
- Young Adult Novel: winner for Alyzon Whitestarr
- Children's Long Fiction: winner for Little Fur: The Legend of Little Fur

2002 – Aurealis Awards

- Young Adult Short Story Award: winner for Dreamwalker

1998 – Aurealis Awards

- Young Adult Novel: winner for Greylands
- Fantasy Novel: shortlisted for "Darkfall: Book One of the Legendsong"

1998 – Ditmar Awards

- Australian Long Fiction: shortlisted for Darkfall

1997 – Aurealis Awards

- Young Adult Short Story: winner for Green Monkey Dreams

1997 – Fantasy, Sci-Fi, Horror, Stories

- Young Adult Division: winner for Greylands

1996 – Aurealis Awards

- Young Adult Novel: shortlisted for Ashling

1994 – The Children's Book Council of Australia Awards

- Book of the Year for Older Readers: joint winner for The Gathering

1994 – W.A. Young Readers Book Award (WAYRA)

- Second for The Gathering

1993 – Children's Peace Literature Award (PEACE)

- Best Book: joint winner for The Gathering

1992 – 3M Talking Book Award – (NSW)

- Talking Book: Winner for Scatterlings

1991 – The Children's Book Council of Australia Awards

- Book of the Year for Older Readers – Honour Book for The Farseekers: the Obernewtyn Chronicles

1988 – The Children's Book Council of Australia Awards

- Book of the Year for Older Readers: shortlisted for Obernewtyn: The Obernewtyn Chronicles

A more complete list of Isobelle Carmody's nominations and awards can be found on the author profile at Penguin Books
