= Jennifer Maiden =

Australian poet (born 1949)

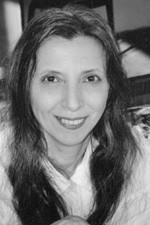
- Born: 1949 (age 76–77); Penrith, New South Wales
- Education: BA
- Alma mater: Macquarie University
- Writing career
- Language: English
- Years active: 1966-
- Notable awards: ALS Gold Medal, 2015. Victorian Prize for Literature, 2014. The FAW Christopher Brennan Award. Three Kenneth Slessor Prizes for Poetry. Two C. J. Dennis Prizes for Poetry. The Melbourne Age Book of the Year. Two The Melbourne Age Poetry Book of the Year awards. The Harri Jones Memorial Prize. The H.M. Butterly-F.Earle Hooper Award(University of Sydney). The Grenfell Henry Lawson Festival Prize. Shortlisted for the Griffin International Poetry Prize.

Jennifer Maiden (born 1949) is an Australian poet. She was born in Penrith, New South Wales, and has had 39 books published: 30 poetry collections, 6 novels and 3 nonfiction works. Her current publishers are Quemar Press in Australia and Bloodaxe Books in the UK. She began writing professionally in the late 1960s and has been active in Sydney's literary scene since then. She took a BA at Macquarie University in the early 1970s. Aside from writing, Jennifer Maiden runs writers workshops with a variety of literary, community and educational organizations and has devised and co-written (with Margaret Cunningham Bennett, who was then the director of the New South Wales Torture and Trauma Rehabilitation Service) a manual of questions to facilitate writing by Torture and Trauma Victims. Later, Maiden and Bennett used the questions they had created as a basis for a clinically planned workbook.

== Career and works ==
Among Maiden's awards are three Kenneth Slessor Prizes for Poetry, two C. J. Dennis Prize for Poetry, the overall Victorian Prize for Literature, the Harri Jones Memorial Prize, the H.M. Butterly-F.Earle Hooper Award(University of Sydney), the Grenfell Henry Lawson Festival Prize, the FAW Christopher Brennan Award for lifetime achievement in poetry, two The Melbourne Age Poetry Book of the Year awards, the overall Melbourne Age Book of the Year and the ALS Gold Medal. She has had residencies at the Australian National University, the University of Western Sydney, Springwood High School and the New South Wales Torture and Trauma Rehabilitation Service. She has been awarded several Fellowships by the Australia Council.

Her second novel Play With Knives has been translated into German as Ein Messer im Haus (dtv, 1994).

Her collection, Pirate Rain, won The Melbourne Age Poetry Book of the Year in 2010 and the N.S.W. Premier's Kenneth Slessor Prize for Poetry in 2011. She is the first writer to have won the Kenneth Slessor Prize three times.

In October 2011, the Australian magazine of politics, society and culture, The Monthly, listed her poetry collection, Friendly Fire (2005), as the poetry book in their selection of 20 Australian Masterpieces since 2000, when they asked 20 Australian art critics to identify "the most significant work of art in their field since 2000".

Her first UK collection, Intimate Geography, which is a selection from four of her Australian collections (Acoustic Shadow, Mines, Friendly Fire and Pirate Rain), was published by Bloodaxe Books in March, 2012.

Her collection, Liquid Nitrogen, was published by Giramondo in November, 2012, won the C. J. Dennis Prize for Poetry and the overall Victorian Prize for Literature, and was shortlisted for the Griffin International Poetry Prize, the Australian Prime Minister's Awards, and the Judith Wright Calanthe Award. A chapbook of some of her new poems, The Violence of Waiting, was published by Vagabond Press in November, 2013. Her collection, Drones and Phantoms, was published by Giramondo in 2014, and won the 2015 ALS Gold Medal. Her collection, The Fox Petition, was published by Giramondo in November, 2015.

A new, revised edition of her novel Play With Knives was published online as a free download by Quemar Press in 2016, followed by its previously unpublished sequel, Play With Knives: Two: Complicity.

Maiden's collection, The Metronome, deals partly with the 2016 U.S. elections and includes their result in its epilogue. Because of topical relevance, Quemar Press uploaded its electronic edition on 9 November 2016. Giramondo published a print edition of The Metronome in March 2017.

Her fourth novel, Play With Knives: Three: George and Clare and the Grey Hat Hacker, was published online in December, 2016, as an exclusive from Quemar Press. It is a prose/verse sequel to Play With Knives, Play With Knives: Two: Complicity, and those of her poems which feature her characters George Jeffreys and Clare Collins.

Aside from writing, her artwork has appeared on several of her book covers, including The Winter Baby, Acoustic Shadow, The Trust, and some of her books published by Quemar Press. She also created three collages of photographs for Quemar Press' collection of Montaigne's ideas, Truth in Discourse: Observations by Montaigne.

Her collection, Appalachian Fall: Poems About Poverty in Power, was released by Quemar Press in 2018.

In January 2018, her novel, Play With Knives, was combined with its sequel, Play With Knives: Two: Complicity, in a paperback published by Quemar Press. This was the first time Play With Knives: Two: Complicity was published in print form.

A Selected Poems 1967-2018 by Jennifer Maiden was published from Quemar Press in February 2018.

Jennifer Maiden's recent novels in poetry and prose, Play With Knives: Three and Play With Knives: Four were published in single paperback book from Quemar Press in 2018.

The final novel in the Play With Knives Quintet, Play With Knives: Five: George and Clare, the Malachite and the Diamonds, an experimental novel in poetry and prose, was released by Quemar Press in September 2018.

Her new collection of poems, brookings: the noun, was released in early 2019 by Quemar Press.

Following her work as Writer in Residence at the NSW Service for the Treatment and Rehabilitation of Torture and Trauma Survivors, Jennifer Maiden and the torture and trauma clinician, academic and researcher, Margaret Bennett collaborated, in 2019, on a workbook to assist torture or trauma survivors to write of their experiences, entitled Workbook Questions: Writing of Torture, Trauma Experience.

Maiden's poetry collection The Espionage Act, was published at the beginning of 2020. In December 2019, an advance copy was included in Fairfax Media's list of most appreciated books in 2019'

In 2020, another non-fiction work by Jennifer Maiden was released, entitled The Cuckold and the Vampires: an essay on some aspects of conservative political manipulation of art and literature, including the experimental, and the conservatives' creation of conflict.

Biological Necessity: New Poems was released in 2021.

Ox in Metal: New Poems was released in 2022.

Another poetry collection by Jennifer Maiden Golden Bridge was published in January, 2023.

Her non-fiction book The Laps of the Gods: Power, Sexuality, Publishing and Literature: an exploratory essay was also published in 2023.

The China Shelf: New Poems was released in 2024.

In 2025, her collection WW III: New Poems was published.

Her collection, Mandatory Sentence: New Poems was released in 2026.

== Literary awards ==
Year	Work	Award	Category	Result	Ref
1976	The Problem of Evil	Harri Jones Memorial Prize for Poetry	—	Won	
1991	The Winter Baby	Kenneth Slessor Prize for Poetry	—	Won	
1991	The Winter Baby	Victorian Premier's Literary Awards	C.J. Dennis Prize	Won	
1993	Acoustic Shadow	The Age Book of the Year Awards	Poetry	Shortlisted	
1993	Acoustic Shadow	Kenneth Slessor Prize for Poetry	—	Shortlisted	
1998	—	Christopher Brennan Award	—	Won	
2000	Mines	Kenneth Slessor Prize for Poetry	—	Won	
2006	Friendly Fire	The Age Book of the Year Awards	Book of the Year	Won	
2006	Friendly Fire	The Age Book of the Year Awards	Poetry	Won	
2010	Pirate Rain	The Age Book of the Year Awards	Poetry	Won	
2011	Pirate Rain	Kenneth Slessor Prize for Poetry	—	Won	
2013	Liquid Nitrogen	Griffin Poetry Prize	International	Shortlisted	
2013	Liquid Nitrogen	Prime Minister's Literary Awards	Poetry	Shortlisted	
2013	Liquid Nitrogen	Victorian Premier's Literary Awards	Poetry	Won	
2013	Liquid Nitrogen	Victorian Premier's Literary Awards	Victorian Prize for Literature	Won	
2015	Drones and Phantoms	ALS Gold Medal	—	Won	
2016	The Fox Petition	Western Australian Premier's Book Awards	Poetry	Shortlisted	
2018	The Metronome	Victorian Premier's Literary Awards	Poetry	Shortlisted	
2024	Golden Bridge: New Poems	Prime Minister's Literary Award	Poetry	Shortlisted	

== Bibliography ==
=== Poetry ===
==== Collections ====
- Maiden, Jennifer (1974). Tactics. St Lucia, Qld.: UQP.
- The Problem of Evil. (Prism, 1975)
- The Occupying Forces. (Gargoyle, 1975)
- Mortal Details. (Rigmarole, 1977)
- Birthstones. (Angus & Robertson, 1978)
- The Border Loss. (Angus & Robertson, 1979)
- For The Left Hand. (South Head, 1981)
- The Trust. (Black Lightning, 1988)
- Bastille Day. (NLA, 1990)
- Selected Poems of Jennifer Maiden (Penguin, 1990)
- The Winter Baby (Angus & Robertson, 1990)
- Acoustic Shadow (Penguin, 1993)
- Mines (Paper Bark, 1999) ISBN 90-5704-046-8
- Friendly Fire (Giramondo, 2005) ISBN 1-920882-12-X
- Pirate Rain (Giramondo, 2009) ISBN 978-1-920882-59-4
- Intimate Geography: Selected Poems 1991-2010 (Bloodaxe Books, 2012) ISBN 978-1-85224-926-7
- Liquid Nitrogen (Giramondo, 2012) ISBN 978-1-920882-99-0
- The Violence of Waiting (Vagabond Press, 2013)
- Drones and Phantoms (Giramondo, 2014) ISBN 978-1-922146-72-4
- The Fox Petition (Giramondo, 2015) ISBN 978-1-922146-94-6
- The Metronome (Electronic Edition: Quemar Press, 2016) ISBN 978-0-9954181-0-3, (Print Edition: Giramondo, 2017) ISBN 978-1-925336-21-4 (pbk.)
- Appalachian Fall: Poems About Poverty in Power (Quemar Press, 2018) Print Edition ISBN 978-0-9954181-7-2, Electronic Edition ISBN 978-0-9954181-8-9
- Selected Poems 1967-2018 (Quemar Press, 2018) Print Edition ISBN 978-0-6482342-0-3, Electronic Edition ISBN 978-0-6482342-1-0
- brookings: the noun (Quemar Press, 2019) Print Edition ISBN 978-0-6482342-7-2, Electronic Edition ISBN 978-0-6482342-8-9
- The Espionage Act (Quemar Press, 2020) Print Edition ISBN 978-0-6485552-2-3, Electronic Edition ISBN 978-0-6485552-3-0
- Biological Necessity: New Poems (Quemar Press, 2021) Print Edition ISBN 978-0-6485552-8-5, Electronic Edition ISBN 978-0-6485552-9-2
- Ox in Metal: New Poems (Quemar Press, 2022) Print Edition ISBN 978-0-6451720-4-1, Electronic Edition ISBN 978-0-6451720-5-8
- Golden Bridge: New Poems (Quemar Press, 2023) Print Edition ISBN 978-0-6451720-8-9, Electronic Edition ISBN 978-0-6451720-9-6
- The China Shelf: New Poems (Quemar Press, 2024) Print Edition ISBN 978-0-6457126-5-0, Electronic Edition ISBN 978-0-6457126-6-7
- WW III: New Poems (Quemar Press, 2025) Print Edition ISBN 978-0-6457126-8-1, Electronic Edition ISBN 978-0-6457126-9-8
- Mandatory Sentence: New Poems (Quemar Press, 2026) Print Edition ISBN 978-1-7642845-1-6, Electronic Edition ISBN 978-1-7642845-2-3

=== Novels ===
- The Terms. (Hale & Iremonger, 1982)
- Play With Knives. (Allen & Unwin, 1990. New Revised Electronic Edition: Quemar Press, 2016)
- Play With Knives: Two: Complicity. (Quemar Press, 2016)
- Play With Knives: Three: George and Clare and the Grey Hat Hacker. (Quemar Press, 2016) ISBN 978-0-9954181-2-7
- Play With Knives: Four: George and Clare, the Baby and the Bikies. (Quemar Press, 2017) ISBN 978-0-9954181-5-8
- Play With Knives & Play With Knives: Two: Complicity. (Quemar Press, 2018) ISBN 978-0-9954181-9-6 (Paperback)
- Play With Knives: Three: George and Clare and the Grey Hat Hacker & Play With Knives: Four: George and Clare, the Baby and the Bikies. (Quemar Press, 2018) ISBN 978-0-6482342-2-7
- Play With Knives: Five: George and Clare, the Malachite and the Diamonds. (Quemar Press, 2018) Print Edition ISBN 978-0-6482342-5-8, Electronic Edition ISBN 978-0-6482342-6-5

=== Non-Fiction ===
- Workbook Questions: Writing of Torture, Trauma Experience (Written in collaboration with Margaret Bennett). (Quemar Press, 2019) Print Edition ISBN 978-0-6485552-1-6
- The Cuckold and the Vampires: an essay on some aspects of conservative political manipulation of art and literature, including the experimental, and the conservatives' creation of conflict. (Quemar Press, 2020) Print Edition ISBN 978-0-6485552-7-8, Electronic Edition ISBN 978-0-6485552-5-4
- The Laps of the Gods: Power, Sexuality, Publishing and Literature: an exploratory essay (Quemar Press, 2023) Electronic Edition ISBN 978-0-6457126-1-2

== See also ==
- 1974 in poetry
- 1975 in poetry
- 1977 in poetry
- 1978 in poetry
- 1979 in poetry
- 1981 in poetry
- 1988 in poetry
- 1990 in poetry
- 1993 in poetry
- 1999 in poetry
- 2005 in poetry
- 2010 in poetry
- 2012 in poetry
- 2013 in poetry
- 2014 in poetry
- 1982 in literature
- 1990 in literature
