= Play with Knives =

The paperback covers of the books in Jennifer Maiden's Play With Knives Quintet, and a photograph of the author

Play With Knives is a novel by the Australian author Jennifer Maiden. Maiden wrote the original manuscript in the early 1980s, and it was published in an abridged form by Allen & Unwin in 1990. It was translated into German by dtv Verlagsgesellschaft as Ein Messer im Haus in 1994. Quemar Press published the novel digitally in an updated edition in 2016, and published it in a paperback edition in 2018, combining it with its unpublished sequel, Play With Knives: Two: Complicity. Play With Knives is the first book in Maiden's Play With Knives Quintet of novels.

== Plot ==
Play With Knives takes place in Sydney's Western Suburbs and focuses on Clare Collins, a young woman released from prison, after murdering her siblings at the age of nine. The narrator is George Jeffreys, her probation officer. As a serial killer begins targeting women, a complex relationship of survival develops between Clare and George.

== Critical and Cultural Response ==
Play With Knives and its sequels have been a subject of Academic and cultural study and review. Play With Knives has been described as an "impressive psycho-thriller" by The Oxford Companion to Australian Literature. Recently, it was depicted in the Sydney Morning Herald as 'One of the most chilling but underrated Australian novels of the early 1990s' by critic Peter Pierce. John Hanrahan, the Australian critic and author, wrote in Australian Book Review that its sequel, Play With Knives: Two: Complicity, 'explored power, manipulation, control, violence as sexual foreplay, and yet... [is] a novel that has the strength of insight, acceptance, optimism and gentleness. This is a novel about darkness, it walks in darkness, trembles in darkness. But the images of light and of sunshine are also appropriate because they come not from Dracula special effects but from a confident awareness of the aspirations, at once grubby and soaring, of that workhorse muscle, the human heart'. Compulsive Reader analysed the series' structure, stating 'the novels explore guilt and innocence, good and evil, and the individual versus the state or government, using changing tense and viewpoints... the characters swap positions, power matrices, emotional landscapes, and unravel the structures in which they work’. The Literary editor of The Age newspaper, Jason Steger announced Quemar Press' publication of the updated edition of Play With Knives in his Literary news column, Booksmarks. In the Sydney Morning Herald, the critic Geoff Page also announced the release of the third novel in the series, Play With Knives: Three: George and Clare and the Grey Hat Hacker. Books from the Play With Knives series have been studied and analysed in journal articles and books, including Australian Literary Studies, The Country of Lost Children : An Australian Anxiety, Out West : Perceptions of Sydney's Western Suburbs, Australian Book Review, Australian Women's Book Review.

== Sequels and later use of characters ==
Play With Knives became the first book in Maiden's Play With Knives Quintet, continuing her story of the characters Clare and George. The first two books in the series are from the first-person perspective of the narrator George Jeffreys, while the final three books are written in juxtaposed poetry and prose and from juxtaposed first person and third person perspectives. The characters Clare and George are also amongst those featured in Maiden's later poetry collections, from 2005 onwards.

== Titles in the Play With Knives Series ==
- Play With Knives. (Allen & Unwin, 1990. New Revised Electronic Edition: Quemar Press, 2016)
- Play With Knives: Two: Complicity. (Quemar Press, 2016)
- Play With Knives: Three: George and Clare and the Grey Hat Hacker. (Quemar Press, 2016) ISBN 978-0-9954181-2-7
- Play With Knives: Four: George and Clare, the Baby and the Bikies. (Quemar Press, 2017) ISBN 978-0-9954181-5-8
- Play With Knives & Play With Knives: Two: Complicity. (Quemar Press, 2018) ISBN 978-0-9954181-9-6 (Paperback)
- Play With Knives: Three: George and Clare and the Grey Hat Hacker & Play With Knives: Four: George and Clare, the Baby and the Bikies. (Quemar Press, 2018) ISBN 978-0-6482342-2-7 (Paperback)
- Play With Knives: Five: George and Clare, the Malachite and the Diamonds. (Quemar Press, 2018) Print Edition ISBN 978-0-6482342-5-8, Electronic Edition ISBN 978-0-6482342-6-5
