= Tom Flood =

Australian novelist, editor, manuscript assessor, songwriter and musician

- Born: 17 March 1955 (age 71); Sydney, New South Wales Australia
- Occupation: author
- Writing career
- Language: English
- Years active: 1988 -
- Notable work: Oceana Fine
- Notable awards: Miles Franklin Award
- Website: www.manuscripts.com.au

Tom Flood (born 17 March 1955) is an Australian novelist, playwright, and writer of short stories. His is best known for authoring the novel Oceana Fine for which he won several of Australia's top literary prizes; among them the Australian/Vogel Literary Award, the Miles Franklin Award, and the Victorian Premier's Literary Award.

== Life and career ==
Tom Flood was born in Sydney in New South Wales, and grew up in Western Australia. He is the son of Dorothy Hewett and Les Flood. He is the brother of Joe Flood, Michael Flood, Kate Lilley and Rozanna Lilley. In his early years he worked variously as a paper boy, a tuna fisherman, a bus conductor and a rock musician.

Flood's first novel Oceana Fine won the 1988 Australian/Vogel Literary Award, the 1990 Miles Franklin Award and the 1990 Victorian Premier's Literary Award Vance Palmer Prize for Fiction. He has had a handful of short stories published in newspapers and journals, both Australian and international.

In 2001 he won the Banjo Paterson Writing Award in the prose category for his short story "The Old Trails".

== Works ==
=== Novels ===
- Oceana Fine (1989, Allen and Unwin)

=== Plays ===
- Model Citizen (1993)

=== Short stories ===
- "Devegetation" (1986, published in Australian Short Stories)
- "A Taste of Writing : Word of Mouth" (1990, published in The Independent Monthly)
- "Tattoo" (1991, published in Millennium : Time-Pieces by Australian Writers)
- "Birdland" (1993, published in The Book of Poets on the Heath)
- "Apostrophe" (1996, published in Risks)
- "The Old Trails" (2001)
- "Countercharacter No. 3" (2001, published in Southerly)
- "Countercharacter No. 4" (2007, published in Salt Magazine)
- "In the Skin" (2022, published in Phase Change)

=== Other ===
- "Snapshots and Memory's Alchemy" (1989, published in The Australian Magazine), criticism
- "Deluge of Memory" (1991, published in Editions), review of Fineflour by Gillian Mears
- "First Light, First Light, Touch a Star and Catch as Might" from a Work-in-Progress (1993, published in Picador New Writing 1993), extract
- "Saying Father" (1994, published in Family Pictures), biography
