= Obernewtyn Chronicles =

Novel series by Isobelle Carmody

The Obernewtyn Chronicles
- Obernewtyn; The Farseekers; Ashling; The Keeping Place; The Stone Key; The Sending; The Red Queen
- Author: Isobelle Carmody
- Country: Australia
- Language: English
- Genre: Fantasy, Science fiction novel, Post Apocalyptic
- Publisher: Penguin Group
- Published: 1987–2015
- Media type: Print (Paperback & Hardback)

The Obernewtyn Chronicles is a series of science fiction and fantasy novels by Australian author Isobelle Carmody. The series has a post apocalyptic setting and depicts a world long after its destruction by a global nuclear holocaust.

The series' protagonist, Elspeth Gordie, is a young girl with mental powers condemned by the series' main antagonists, the governing body, known as the council, and the religious authority, the Herder Faction. The novels deal with themes of responsibility, duty, prejudice, discrimination, tolerance, and human and animal rights.

== Books of the series ==
The series consists of seven novels published by Penguin Books.

1. Obernewtyn (1987)
2. The Farseekers (1990)
3. Ashling (1995)
4. The Keeping Place (1999)
5. Wavesong (2008)
6. The Stone Key (2008)
7. The Sending (2011)
8. The Red Queen (2015)

In the United States and Canada, the books are published by Random House. Random House split The Stone Key into two books: The Stone Key and Wavesong. The United States and Canada have also split The Sending into two books: The Sending and The Waking Dragon.

Though initially intended to be the final installment, The Sending was the penultimate book. The final book, The Red Queen, was released in November 2015.

== Setting ==
The series is set many years into the future, where the world has been ravaged by a great nuclear holocaust known as the Great White. The few people left have formed a new way of living, led by a body called the Council.

The Council realised that they had not escaped the effects of the Great White completely unscathed, and began burning any humans or animals born with deformities. The Council appointed a fledgling religious order called the Herder Faction to oversee these rituals. The Herders believed that Lud, their name for God, sent the Great White as punishment for a materialistic society. As a result, they destroyed all artifacts of the old world known as the Beforetime.

Those who spoke out against the Herders, or researched the period before the nuclear holocaust or its technology, were declared Seditioners (from the word sedition) and were burnt alive. Council law and the Herder Faction gradually fused, and came to depend on each other. If the two governing bodies did not burn the dissidents, they sent them to work on Councilfarms. Orphan homes were set up to house those children of Seditioners not claimed by relatives.

It later became clear that mutations of the mind could develop which were not visible at birth. The Council and Herder Faction decided that those few people affected by mental mutations, called Misfits, would be sent to the Councilfarms. They sent the more afflicted Misfits to the remote mountain estate of Obernewtyn to be treated, and to be isolated from normal people.

== Plot ==
Elspeth Gordie and her brother Jes grow up in an orphanage after their parents are burned as Seditioners. Elspeth has enhanced mental abilities and must conceal them in order to avoid being discovered as a Misfit. At the beginning of the first book in the series, Obernewtyn, Elspeth is named a Misfit and is sent to Obernewtyn, a place run by people who claim to investigate the Misfits and look for a cure to their abilities.

At Obernewtyn, Elspeth discovers what is really happening to all the Misfits that Madam Vega, the co-owner of Obernewtyn, claims she is curing. Together the Misfits form an uprising and take over Obernewtyn, turning it into a secret refuge for both Misfits and animals.

Elspeth is not just a Misfit; she is what the animals call the Innle, or Seeker in English, and she must find and destroy the weaponmachines around the world. The weaponmachines are what caused the Great White, and Elspeth has to seek them out to destroy them before the world is plunged into another Great White.

However, the Misfits can't hide forever and must find a place in The Land as it enters a period of turmoil, as rebels begin to revolt against the Council and the Herder Faction. The elusive Twentyfamilies' Gypsies, and half-blooded gypsies, also play an important role in the political and social struggles of The Land.

== Powers of the mind ==
Powers of the mind play a significant part in the series, and may manifest themselves in a variety of ways and as a variety of abilities. Minor, weak powers, such as the ability to true dream, or the possession of a knack for guessing correctly, seem to be rather widespread, although mostly these abilities exist only in the unconscious levels of the brain. As such, many individuals with these powers are not aware of their abilities and cannot control them.

Sentient powers are called Talents, and may be used at will by their possessor. The seven most common Talents, as defined and named by the Misfits of Obernewtyn, are farseeking, coercion, empathy, healing, futuretelling, beastspeaking, and teknopathing. A Talented Misfit may possess one or more of these Talents, although one particular power will usually manifest itself more strongly than the others. Some combinations of Talents, such as farseeking and beastspeaking, are quite common, while others, such as coercion and empathy, are rare.

At Obernewtyn, each Misfit belongs to a group, or Guild, consisting of similarly Talented individuals. A Misfit is free to choose which guild he or she wishes to belong to, but usually the guild corresponding to their strongest Talent is chosen. Each guild is led by a leadership group consisting of a Guildmaster or Guildmistress (who is usually, but not necessarily, Obernewtyn's strongest possessor of that Talent), a Guilden, and one or more Wards. Guilds are responsible for nurturing their members' abilities, and also for contributing something to Obernewtyn as a whole; the Farseeker Guild, for example, is responsible for scrying out Talented Misfits. Guild leaders meet to discuss the affairs of Obernewtyn in meetings called Guildmerge.

An outline of the seven Talents, examples of powerful possessors, and each guild's master are as follows.

Powers of the mind
Talent	Description	Known Misfit Members	Guildmaster / Mistress
Farseeking	Essentially telepathy; the ability to communicate with others mind-to-mind over distance. Possible range depends on the mental strength of the individuals involved. Also the ability to read the minds of others without this power.	Elspeth, Matthew, Ceirwan, Jik, Wila, Zarak, Kader (a secondary ability)	Elspeth
Coercion	Mind-control; the ability to manipulate others' minds without them knowing. One of the three Talents that uses the ability to deep probe.	Elspeth, Gevan, Harwood, Kally, Linnet, Merret, Miryum, Domick, Taril, Dragon, Ariel	Gevan
Empathy	The ability to receive emotions at greater strengths than others can, and, in some Misfits, the ability to transmit emotions to others.	Dameon, Miky, Angina, Freya, Dragon, Ariel, Jik, Blyss, Kader, Kally (a secondary ability), Kella (a slight talent)	Dameon
Healing	The ability to heal others' bodies through the use of a finely tuned mental deep probe.	Roland, Kella, Kador	Roland
Futuretelling	Seeing the future; performed by sending a deep probe dangerously close to the mindstream, the deepest subconscious of all sentient beings where all individual minds' past, present and future merge and form one. A probe will hover above the mindstream detecting bubbles which reveal the past or future.	Maryon, Dell, Christa, Ariel	Maryon
Beastspeaking	Farseeking between humans and animals; not all Farseekers are Beastspeakers, nor vice versa.	Elspeth, Alad, Khuria, Merret, Zarak, Lina	Alad
Teknoguilding	A deep affinity with machines and a love for study, especially of technology (and therefore of the Beforetime). Possibly entails some ability to manipulate machines mentally.	Garth, Pavo, Fian, Jak,	Garth

Outside of these seven Talents, other powers have emerged or have been expressed in different ways in the series.

Elspeth possesses a mysterious power known as the killing power, related to her coercion Talent, something she has described as a "dark snake" coiled at the base of her mind. It has the power to kill individuals as shown in the novel Obernewtyn, when she used this power to kill Madam Vega. The killing power can also be used to augment her other powers to increased levels, as shown in Ashling when Elspeth uses it to break through Dragon's mental defences, and in The Keeping Place in order to break through the demonband static.

Other powers to have emerged include Dragon's illusion-generating abilities, which have been described as the result of a critical mass of coercion mental power (other coercers display this power but not to the same degree). Freya's empathy also displays abilities outside of the normal range. Her power is described as "enhancing"; allowing people under its effect to perform better than they otherwise would. Ariel's rare empathy and coercion combination allows him to feed his victims ghastly visions of torture while using empathy to make the victim think they're enjoying the experience. He is described by Domick, a victim of this torture, as an "empath turned inside out".

Two children described in the series, Lidgebaby (first seen in The Farseekers) and Gavyn (The Keeping Place), also have strange abilities. Lidgebaby's coercion powers allowed her to link other Talents to her, effectively binding them to her to the effect that they were compelled to protect and love her above all else. A side-effect of this never before seen merging was the generation of mental static that cancelled out all other powers, as experienced by Elspeth in The Farseekers and later in The Red Queen. Gavyn is described as "adantar", beastspeak for "link". He has an unusual amount of control and effect over animals even though he isn't a beastspeaker. Elspeth and the beasts believed he is some sort of enthraller, whose powers only affect beasts.

In addition, the animals of Obernewtyn have formed the Beast Guild. Their leader is the mare Avra. The Beast guild have equal rights to participate in Guildmerge. It seems that most, if not all, beasts can communicate with each other mentally. Most species of beast are also able to communicate with any human beastspeaker, although some, such as cats, dogs and horses, are more able to do so than others, such as cows and wolves. As humans cannot beastspeak birds (besides the Agyllians), it is not known if birds can beastspeak each other, or if other animals can beastspeak with birds.

== Beast language ==
The animals of the Obernewtyn world are described as sentient beings capable of speech. However their form of communication is not oral but mental in nature. This form of mental communication has been described as a blending of word and mental images, with empathised emotions. The beast language also uses different words, such as funaga (human), equine (horse), barud (home), gehdra (the invisible ones), jahran (the cold ones), vlar-rei (children of the waves/dolphins), coldwhite (snow), galta (nothing), shortsleep (sleep), longsleep (death), Innle (seeker), and H'rayka (bringer of death). The beast language also runs words together to form a single word, examples include freerunning, strongminded, gladshield, moonwatcher, daywatcher, and fireheart.

== Characters ==
The Obernewtyn Chronicles are populated by a large cast of characters. Only the most important of these are listed here.

=== Misfits ===
- Elspeth Gordie: Elspeth is the main character in the Obernewtyn Chronicles. Her parents were burned for the crime of sedition when she was young, and was sent to live at Kinraide Orphanage with her older brother, Jes, who nicknamed her Elf). She was condemned to Obernewtyn after Madame Vega came to evaluate the orphans to discover any "mutants" among them, and became suspicious of Elspeth. Elspeth is tall and slim, with brilliant green eyes. She was given the nickname "little sad-eyes" by Brydda Llewellyn, due to her serious demeanour. Her hair is long and black, and she has pale skin. Elspeth is the Seeker, or Innle in the beast-language. Despite much evidence proving her to be the Seeker, Elspeth constantly denies this. Also known as Elaria to the Gypsies, she's been dubbed a figure of legends, and is said to do a number of things. The most important of these are to find the five signs and beat the Destroyer to the computers controlling the weaponmachines in time to prevent a second Great White, and to free the beasts from human dominance. Elspeth possesses many talents, which sets her apart from other Talented Misfits. She possesses the abilities of farseeking, coercing, beastspeaking, and possibly teknoguilding. Some futuretelling or truedreaming ability is also apparent, although this is vague and uncontrolled. She has the power to heal her own body, bestowed upon her by Nerat the Agyllian in The Farseekers. She also has a separate Talent of killing with her mind that she is too scared to uncover properly, however this ability can also be used to increase the strength of her other Talents. The only Talent she does not seem to have is empathy. In fact Elspeth struggles with emotions although she is trying harder to be understanding. Elspeth becomes betrothed to Rushton Seraphim at the end of Ashling, having realised that what she had felt for Rushton had been love, but she had been too scared to face it. The two of them are estranged for a time but reconcile in the Stone Key. Elspeth's friend Dameon is also in love with her but she fails to see it.
- Rushton Seraphim: Rushton is the eldest son of the former Master of Obenewtyn, Michael Seraphim. His half-brother is Stephen Seraphim. He is a Misfit with latent powers. He is approximately nineteen years-old at the beginning of the series, and is tall, with jade green eyes and dark hair. He is originally the heir to Obernewtyn, and as of The Farseekers, Master of Obernewtyn. Rushton is first known to Elspeth as the farm overseer at Obernewtyn, a post he holds while he plots to claim his birthright to Obernewtyn from his defective younger half-brother's evil minders. As Master of Obernewtyn, Rushton transformed Obernewtyn into a haven for Misfits and beasts alike. Rushton is a Misfit with latent Talent, which he only begins to use at the end of Ashling when Freya, an "empath-enhancer", tries to enhance his abilities. At the end of Ashling he becomes betrothed to Elspeth. She enhances his abilities further than anyone else could. In The Keeping Place Rushton is kidnapped by Ariel, and tortured into insanity. While Elspeth is able to cure him, in The Stone Key it is revealed that his trauma has left him hollow and devoid of the capacity for love. This is displayed towards Elspeth initially with apathy, which slowly transforms into hatred and loathing, and finally causes him to relapse into a mad, animalistic state which Elspeth eventually cures once again, this time permanently through use of intense deep probing. All of this, apart from Elspeth's final triumph, was foreseen and orchestrated by Ariel.
- Ariel: Ariel is a Misfit with a defective mind and a rare empathy-coercion combination of talents. He is the principal antagonist throughout the series, appearing time and again in positions of power and influence. Intelligent, manipulative, sadistic, ambitious, and highly attractive, Ariel was, before Rushton's coup, favoured by the keepers of Obernewtyn and assisted them in their failed quest to find the Beforetime weaponmachines. In The Farseekers, it is believed that Ariel has run away from Obernewtyn, and is presumed dead. However he has instead ingratiated himself with Henry Druid, the Herder Faction, the council, and Salamander. Ariel is megalomaniacal, with every new book in the series slowly unfolding his wide-stretching and subtle plan. While it is clear he intends to purposefully reawaken the weaponmachines, and has attempted to seduce Elspeth to his cause, it is unclear if he is aware of how dire the consequences of these actions would be. His motives are often shrouded in mystery, and his apparent ability as a futureteller means that he is always one step ahead of Elspeth and the Misfits. Identified by Gahltha as H'Rayka—or "one who brings destruction"—Elspeth assumes Ariel is the Destroyer of which Atthis warned her. In fact, as suggested by the literal interpretation of his title, rather than being the Destroyer, he will be responsible for leading another individual—the true Destroyer—to their unwitting fate.
- Dameon: Dameon is a powerful blind empath, and, with Matthew, one of Elspeth's first friends at Obernewtyn. He is an older misfit who is tall, blind, has an "angular" body, light to white eyes, a slightly large nose, and many freckles. Dameon is a very talented empath and Guildmaster of the Empath Guild. He first appears in the first book of the series, Obernewtyn, and has been regarded as one of Elspeth's most loyal friends. Dameon was the son of a Councilman. He was to inherit all the vast properties of his father after his death, however, upon the death of his father, Dameon's cousin pronounced him a Misfit in order to send him away and gain the land for himself. Ironically, even though to his cousin did not really believe he was a Misfit, he actually is one. Dameon was sent to Obernewtyn where he met Matthew, and later, Elspeth. In The Stone Key it is mentioned that he intends to sue his cousin to regain his lands, and establish a cooperative farm there. It has been interpreted by many that Dameon is secretly in love with Elspeth. There are many implications of this throughout the series, but a popular indicator occurs in the third book Ashling. When Elspeth and Rushton become betrothed, Dameon chooses not to return to Obernewtyn. Rushton says he knows the reason that he must stay behind, and Elspeth is surprised that Dameon blushes at this comment. Dameon then creates a "block", so that Elspeth cannot read his thoughts and he cannot read her feelings as they say goodbye. Series author Carmody has stated that she did in fact intend Dameon to be in love with Elspeth. This is made clear in The Red Queen.
- Matthew: Matthew is a farseeker, and, with Dameon, one of Elspeth's first friends at Obernewtyn. Matthew is the first human with whom Elspeth communicates mentally, and the first Talented human, other than herself, whom she encounters. He is later made farseeker ward, a post he holds until he is captured by slavers and taken to the Land of the Red Queen where he serves slave labour. Matthew is slightly older than Elspeth, and is described as tall, thin, and "sharp eyed". Matthew is a farseeker's guilden, and was the first to introduce Elspeth to Dameon.
- Dragon: Dragon is a young, but wild girl, and powerful empath-coercer. She was discovered and rescued on a farseeker expedition to the West Coast. She acted as the protector of the ruins in Aborium, and used her abilities to project images into people's minds of things of which they were thinking. Her name was unknown, so Elspeth called her Dragon, not just for her flame-red hair and fiery temperament, but for the image she projected into all their minds on their first encounter in her attempt to scare them away. In The Keeping Place, Dragon falls into a comatose due to Elspeth's harsh mental probe and begins attacking Elspeth in her dreams due to her longing for her and supposed 'abandonment' but is eventually cured. Dragon is the daughter of the Red Queen from the distant and mysterious Land of the Red Queen, and as such she holds important clues to Elspeth's personal quests in the deep subconscious levels of her mind.
- Domick: Domick is one of Rushton's allies early in the series, and later a coercer guilden. Domick is sent to establish a safe house for Obernewtyn in Sutrium, the capital of The Land. There he infiltrates the council as Obernewtyn's spy, creating the alter-ego Mika for this purpose, and his espionage work sends him almost insane. He later renounces his ties to Obernewtyn. He was captured, along with Rushton, by Ariel and taken to Herder Island where he was physically and mentally tortured. He was brainwashed by Ariel, and was infected with disease so as to spread a plague throughout the land.
- Kella: Kella is a healer guilden, Elspeth's main female friend, and Domick's bondmate. She accompanies Domick to Sutrium, although his work at the Council cause the two to become estranged.
- Daffyd: Daffyd is an armsman for the Herder renegade Henry Druid, and a Misfit. Daffyd is sympathetic to Obernewtyn's cause and is friends with Elspeth and Rushton, and is required to search for his Misfits friends, who disappeared after the Druid's camp was destroyed by a firestorm.
- Pavo: Pavo is a tecknoguilder who died from the rotting sickness while trying to help Elspeth and the other Misfits when they went to Sutrium.

=== Beasts ===
- Maruman: Maruman is a fey, battered cat, and the first being with whom Elspeth communicates mentally. Maruman endures frequent bouts of madness, and even at his most sane he is prone to making cryptic predictions about Elspeth's fate. It is from Maruman that Elspeth learns most about her roles as the Seeker and Innle. According to prophecy, Maruman is the Moonwatcher, one of Elspeth's guardians in her quest. Maruman first appears in the first book, Obernewtyn, where he encountered Elspeth at the Kinraide Orphan Home after she alerted a bird to his presence. This was also Elspeth's first experience with her mind powers; after she realised she could hear Maruman cursing, he is the first being she communicates with mentally. As the Moonwatcher, Maruman travels with Elspeth on most of her dreamtrail wanderings and adventures, protecting and guarding her from unknown forces, and serving as a foil to Gahltha, the horse also known as the Daywatcher. He is known as Yelloweyes to his fellow beasts, and is held in high regard by them. The Agyllians, or flamebirds, are in constant communication with Maruman, resulting in schizophrenic tendencies. It is from Maruman that Elspeth learns most about her roles as the Seeker and Innle, the Innle being destined to free the animals from their human oppressors. Maruman is a contrary being, and his temperament can shift, without warning, from wise to sullen and difficult. His age is never specified, it is only known that he is ancient, and possibly Beforetime in his origin, which would make him over a century old. As of The Keeping Place, he is left with only one eye, due to his solitary adventures in the radioactive Blacklands. The last appearance of Maruman is his return to Obernewtyn with Elspeth and Gahltha at the end of The Stone Key. However he is depicted cradled by Elspeth on the cover for the yet-unreleased sixth book, The Sending, where they are shown alone and walking the deathroad.
- Gahltha: Gahltha is a noble, black horse, originally mad and spiteful due to mistreatment by his former human owners, however he becomes wise, calm and understanding due to Atthis and the Agyllians when he decided he wanted to die but they promised him a purpose, to look after Elspeth. Gahltha is Elspeth's mount on all her travels, and is the Daywatcher, the second of Elspeth's fated guardians.
- Atthis: Atthis is the leader of the Agyllians, or Guanette birds, a powerful, wise and ancient species of bird. Atthis is also one of Elspeth's main sources of information regarding her quest. Atthis often communicates with Elspeth through Maruman. Agyllians in real life are probably most related to phoenixes, upon which they are based.
- Nerat: Nerat is a healer among the Agyllians. In The Farseekers, after Elspeth is found in a cave by three Agyllians and taken to him, Nerat taught her body to heal itself, as she had blocked her pain behind a mental barrier, and if she was not healed she would die.
- Darga: Darga is a small dog belonging to young farseeker Jik. Darga proved extremely adept at navigating safe pathways through contaminated land. He was lost and presumed dead in the firestorm that destroyed Henry Druid's camp, although Maruman subsequently said that Darga's return will be important.
- Avra: Avra is Gahltha's mate, and was originally a wild horse but was taken into the farms at Obernewtyn to work while Alexi and Madam Vega were there. Avra gave birth to a young foal in the Keeping Place.
- Sharna: Sharna was a young dog that worked at the farms in Obernewtyn. He died to protect Elspeth from Ariel's wolves.
- Faraf: Faraf is a young mare that was found at the start of the novel Ashling, where she was being beaten by a young boy who was her owner. Elspeth told Faraf how to get to Obernewtyn, but in the process of getting there Faraf was captured by Sadorians and was taken to be used in the battle games. Faraf was then gifted to Mirium, the coercer guilden for a bonding present. At the start of The Keeping Place, Faraf was escorted to Obernewtyn to live there. Elspeth calls Faraf "little sister mind", and they become very close.

=== Rebels ===
- Brydda Llewellyn: Brydda is a Seditioner and rebel leader. Brydda befriends Elspeth, and is sympathetic to the Misfits' cause. He invites Obernewtyn to join the rebellion against the council, although this proposal faces stern opposition from many of the other rebel leaders. Brydda was the chief organiser of the rebel alliance in its early stages, although control has increasingly been wrested from him by others, most notably Malik and his allies.
- Idris : One of Brydda's most trusted companions. Idris is killed in Ashling by Salamander.
- Malik: Malik is a power hungry rebel leader who is strongly opposed to having the Misfits join the rebellion. Unlike Brydda he has no sympathy for mutants, and regards them as monsters pretending to be human.
- Bodera: Bodera is the rebel leader of Sutrium, father of Dardelan, and Brydda's mentor.
- Dardelan: Dardelan is Bodera's son. He ends up looking after Bodera, and falls in love with Jakoby's daughter, Bruna, with whom he is going to be bonded.

=== Gypsies ===
- Swallow: Swallow is a Twentyfamilies gypsy, son and heir of the D'rekta (the leader of the Twentyfamilies), who later accedes to the D'rektorship himself. Elspeth and Swallow first met when he saved her from an amount of whip lashings from the community in the market. After he saved her he kissed her, but his love for her has never been found, nor Elspeth's love to him, if it ever did occur. He is connected to Elspeth and her quest, possibly as the fated "one of Kasanda blood" who will accompany Elspeth on the final stages of her quest. Swallow has saved Elspeth's life twice, saying he has heard a voice in his head telling him to help her when she is in need. Swallow is a code name; his real name is unknown.
- Iriny: Iriny is a half-sister to Swallow who is rescued by Elspeth in Ashling and brought to Sutrium for healing. It is through her that Elspeth was able to gain contact with Swallow.
- Darius: Darius is a Twentyfamilies gypsy who has the ability to heal beasts, as well as skills to heal humans.
- Maire: Maire is a Twentyfamilies gypsy healer, and is the grandmother of Swallow and Iriny.

=== Beforetimers ===
- Kasanda: Kasanda is a mysterious beforetime seer, also known as Cassandra Duprey, or Cassy. She lived through the Great White and into the first years and decades following it, when the world was in turmoil. Kasanda was the first gypsy D'rekta, and the sister-in-law of the first Red Queen. Before the Great White, she foresaw Elspeth's quest, and following the holocaust, she left scattered clues that will aid Elspeth in fulfilling it.
- Jacob Obernewtyn: Jacob Obernewtyn is the wealthy partner of Hannah Seraphim, owner of the Reichler clinic. Obernewtyn was named after his work on Misfits in the Reichler Clinic.

=== Sadorians ===
- Jakoby: Jakoby is the Sadorian tribal leader, mother to Bruna, and ally of Brydda Llewellyn.
- Bruna: Bruna is Jakoby's arrogant daughter, and the lover of Dardelan.
- Straaka: Straaka was a Sadorian tribesman, who believed he was betrothed to Miryum, and died defending her.
- Seresh: Seresh is Jakoby's twin sister, born with a deformed jaw and mouth, who was sent to the Earthtemple, where Jakoby was not allowed to see her. Seresh ran away from the Earthtemple. Guardians believed she had drowned herself, but later Jakoby was told Seresh had not died, but had stolen money and escaped on a ship. Seresh is the most likely candidate for Salamander.

== Places ==
- Sutrium: Sutrium is the largest city of the Land, located in the lowlands, and often thought of as the capital. It was formerly the seat of the council, and became the seat of the governing of the Land by the citizens and rebels. The Misfits make many trips to Sutrium as it is a very important centre in the Land. The Suggredoon River flows through the western part of the city.
- Aborium: Aborium is a large city on the West Coast. It was the main Herder centre of the Land, and the way to access Herder Isle. Aborium is a bayside city and is where Elspeth initially met Brydda.
- Murmroth: Murmroth is a large city on the West Coast, and the hardest to access city from Obernewtyn. Murmroth is quite isolated from other cities, apart from those on the West Coast, due to the Blacklands.
- Saithwold: Saithwold is a small city with a beach very near to Sutrium, and is often thought of as a suburb of Sutrium, which experiences many troubles. Saithwold is the sister city of Sawlney.
- Sawlney: Sawlney is northeast of Sutrium city. Sawlney is often described as a "humble city", though it has become increasingly dangerous for the Misfits. Sawlney is the sister city of Saithwold.
- Kinraide: Kinraide is a city north of Sutrium in the lowlands in a forested region. It is near to the town of Berrioc, and contains the orphan home where Elspeth grew up.
- Morganna: Morganna is a city on the West Coast.
- Herder Isle: Herder Isle is where the Herders go when they want to leave the cities, and is the home of "The One".
- Sador: Sador is where the battlegames were held to judge if whether the Misfits were the best allies. It is also the place where the Misfits went when they broke the curse on Rushton's mind that separated him from Elspeth.
