= Oceana Fine =

1990 novel by Tom Flood

- First edition
- Author: Tom Flood
- Language: English
- Publisher: Allen & Unwin, Australia
- Publication date: 1989
- Publication place: Australia
- Media type: Paperback
- Pages: 261 pp
- ISBN: 0-04-910111-0
- OCLC: 21834255
- Dewey Decimal: 823 20
- LC Class: PR9619.3.F535 O27 1989

Oceana Fine is a 1990 Miles Franklin Award-winning novel by Australian author Tom Flood.

== Synopsis ==
Finlay Torrent is a university student who goes to work on a Western Australian wheat silo during his summer holidays. Beneath the land lie unused mine shafts, and above, the wheat silos. This novel is part mystery, part psychological thriller and part fantasy as it follows the rises and falls of a farming family.

== Awards ==
- Australian/Vogel Literary Award, 1988
- Victorian Premier's Literary Award for Fiction, 1990
- Miles Franklin Literary Award, 1990

== Critical reception ==
Marian Eldridge in The Canberra Times notes that the novel "takes on the soaring characteristics of magic realism as Flood seeks to create myth through evocation of landscape, family histories, legend ("wheat babies", what a lovely addition to our folklore), and through memory. There is a youthful sexual encounter that, upon its retelling - or reliving - or beginning afresh - has subtly changed as the narrator has changed. Time rolls forward, then, like a change of wind across a wheat field, rolls back again."
