= Judith C. Vogt =

German science fiction writer

- Born: 1981 (age 44–45); Aachen, West Germany
- Occupations: writer, journalist, translator, bookseller
- Writing career
- Language: German
- Website: www.jcvogt.de

Judith C. Vogt, born 1981 in Langenbroich, Düren, is a German author of fantasy, feminist and queer science fiction, young adult literature and historical novels. She is also a role-playing game developer.

== Biography ==
After graduating from secondary school, Judith C. Vogt completed an apprenticeship as a bookseller and then worked as a bookseller for several years.

Her first novel, Im Schatten der Essen, was published in 2011 as part of the Aventurien-Romane series. Other books set in the world of the fictional continent of Aventurien have been published by Fantasy Productions and Ulisses Spiele. Her trilogy of children's books Die Geister des Landes was published in 2012.

With her husband, the physicist Christian Vogt, she has written the steampunk novel Die zerbrochene Puppe published by Feder & Schwert, the sequel Die verlorene Puppe, the two-part historical novel Eburonenlied about the Gallic War, the fantasy trilogy Die 13 Gezeichneten published by Bastei Lübbe and the science fiction novels Wasteland und Ace in Space, which are part of the successful role-playing game Aces in Space.

A game developer, she first wrote adventures and source code for The Dark Eye. Eis & Dampf, Scherbenland and Aces in Space are independent role-playing settings for Fate (role-playing game system). Scherbenland received the German Roleplaying Game Award 2018.

Die zerbrochene Puppe was awarded the 2013 Deutscher Phantastik Preis in the main category Best German-language novel. Coinciding with the novel's nomination, the first German anthology of short stories to be crowdfunded, Eis und Dampf, was produced in collaboration with Feder & Schwert and 10 other authors. Vogt has also taken over the publication of an anthology on the 1200th anniversary of the death of Charlemagne. She was publisher and editor of Roll Inclusive - Diversity und Repräsentation im Pen&Paper-Rollenspiel.

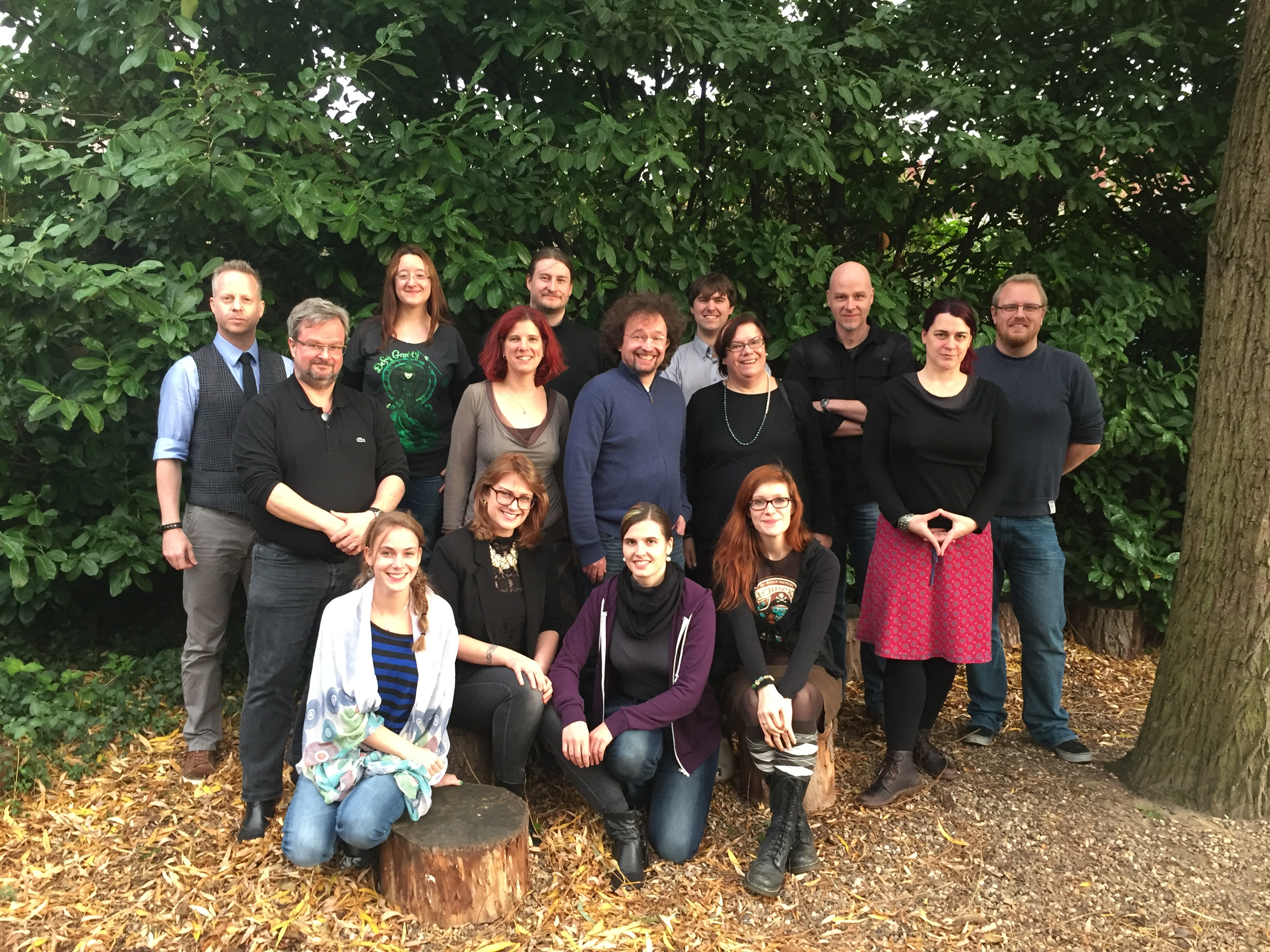
Founders of the Phantastik-Autoren-Netzwerk (PAN).

Together with her husband, Judith C. Vogt is one of the 13 founding members of the Phantastik-Autoren-Netzwerk (PAN). In February 2020, the two announced their departure from the network to denounce its racism.

She lives in Aachen and also works as a translator and journalist. Together with Lena Richter, she runs the nerd culture and role-playing podcast Genderswapped. Together with Lena Richter and Kathrin Dodenhoeft [de], she publishes the quarterly queer and feminist fantasy magazine Queer*Welten.

== Analysis of her works ==
Her novels are part of a progressive literature: she features heroines who can be black or trans women, and the heroes always have, alongside their superpowers, burdens linked to a traumatic past.

Her writing is also part of what has been described as hopepunk, as opposed to the dark, pessimistic dystopian genre known as grimdark. Judith C. Vogt and Christian Vogt probably published the first hopepunk novel, Wasteland, which describes the lives of people living in a market surrounded by violent gangs, the market constituting a Utopian world in a dystopian environment.

== Awards and nominations ==
- 2013: Deutscher Phantastik Preis for Die zerbrochene Puppe (with Christian Vogt).
- 2014: Deutscher Phantastik Preis for Eis und Dampf (with Christian Vogt).
- 2015: Nominated for the Hombuch-Preis for Eis und Dampf (avec Christian Vogt).
- 2015: Literaturpreis HOME for Anthologie Karl – Geschichten eines Großen.
- 2016: Nominated for the Phantastik-Literaturpreis Seraph for Die verlorene Puppe(avec Christian Vogt).
- 2018: Jury award during the Role Play Convention in the accessories category for Phoenix & Monkey,
- 2019: Shortlisted for le Phantastik-Literaturpreis Seraph for Roma Nova
- 2019: Nominated for the Kurd-Laßwitz Award for Roma Nova (5th place)
- 2020: Nominated for the Phantastik Literaturpreis for Wasteland (with Christian Vogt).

== Works (selection) ==
=== Role-playing novels ===
The Dark Eye (DSA)

- Im Schatten der Esse ein Roman in der Welt von Das schwarze Auge (in German). 2011. ISBN 978-3-89064-125-6. OCLC 724570256.
- Im Feuer der Esse ein Roman in der Welt von Das schwarze Auge (in German). 2012. ISBN 978-3-86889-221-5. OCLC 854919408.
- Herrin des Schwarms ein Roman in der Welt von Das Schwarze Auge Roman (in German). 2012. ISBN 978-3-86889-210-9. OCLC 816050605.
- Herr der Legionen ein Roman in der Welt von Das Schwarze Auge (in German). 2012. ISBN 978-3-86889-197-3. OCLC 797180674.
- Brennen soll Bosparan ein Roman in der Welt von Das schwarze Auge (in German). 2017. ISBN 978-3-95752-652-6. OCLC 992438919.

Eis und Dampf (with Christian Vogt)

- Die zerbrochene Puppe (in German). 2012. ISBN 978-3-86762-156-4. OCLC 828193472.
- Die verlorene Puppe (in German). 2016. ISBN 978-3-86762-275-2. OCLC 956514064.

Splittermond

- Phönix und Affe ein Splittermond-Roman (in German). 2018. ISBN 978-3-86762-293-6. OCLC 1008601047.

=== Historical novels ===
- Eburonenlied 1. Schwertbrüder (in German). 2013. ISBN 978-3-9815774-2-6. OCLC 1184496384.
- Eburonenlied 2. Verbranntes Land (in German). 2014. ISBN 978-3-9815774-7-1. OCLC 1184724784.
- Vogt, Judith C; Schmitz, Dieter Hermann (2014). Die Pestflamme (in German). Meyer & Meyer. ISBN 978-3-8403-3544-0. OCLC 903442032.

=== Fantasy novels ===
Die 13 Gezeichneten (with Christian Vogt)

- Die 13 Gezeichneten Roman (in German). 2018. ISBN 978-3-404-20892-0. OCLC 1188936129.
- Die dreizehn Gezeichneten (Band 2) - Die verkehrte Stadt : Roman (in German). Bastei Lübbe AG. 2019. ISBN 978-3-404-20934-7. OCLC 1037888763.
- Die 13 Gezeichneten Roman (in German). 2018. ISBN 978-3-404-20892-0. OCLC 1188936129.

Die Geister des Landes

- Die Geister des Landes Teil 1. Das Erwachen (in German). 2012. ISBN 978-3-9812285-4-0. OCLC 794525392.
- Die Geister des Landes Teil 2. Gesichtslos : phantastischer Roman; [inkl. Mythenführer] (in German). 2013. ISBN 978-3-9815774-3-3. OCLC 864526381.
- Die Geister des Landes Teil 3. Aus der Tiefe : phantastischer Roman; [inkl. Mythenführer] (in German). 2015. ISBN 978-3-945025-05-5. OCLC 879491846.

=== Science fiction novels ===
Standalone novels

- Roma Nova Roman (in German). 2018. ISBN 978-3-404-20914-9. OCLC 1012130845.
- Vogt, Judith C.; Vogt, Christian (2019). Wasteland Roman (in German). Knaur. ISBN 978-3-426-52391-9. OCLC 1096292418.
- Ace in Space (in German). 2020. ISBN 978-3-947720-47-7. OCLC 1235995497.
- Anarchie Déco Roman (in German). 2021. ISBN 978-3-596-00221-4. OCLC 1248719567.
- Schildmaid Das Lied der Skaldin (in German). Piper Verlag. 2022. ISBN 978-3-492-70598-1. OCLC 1275379529.

=== Role plays ===
- Eis & Dampf Mitwirkende : das Steampunk-Setting für Fate (in German). 2015. ISBN 978-3-95867-019-8. OCLC 909793299.
- "Scherbenland Fate" (in German).
- Aces in space (in German). 2020. ISBN 978-3-948691-00-4. OCLC 1245375148.

=== Collaborations ===
- Spohr, Alex; Bade, Martin; Vogt, Judith C (2012). Legenden aus Dunklen Zeiten sechs Kurzabenteuer aus den Dunklen Zeiten (in German). ISBN 978-3-86889-182-9. OCLC 800582370.
- Vogt, Christian; Vogt, Judith C.; Demirtel, Eevie; Exter, Torsten (2013). Feder & Schwert präsentiert: Eis und Dampf eine Steampunk-Anthologie (in German). ISBN 978-3-86762-200-4. OCLC 876163870.
- Karschnick, Ann-Kathrin; Exter, Torsten (2013). Krieger (in German). ISBN 978-3-940036-21-6. OCLC 854922461.
- Vogt, Judith C.; Lange, Christian; Vogt, Christian; Grevener, Anja (2014). Karl - Geschichten eines Großen (in German). BoD – Books on Demand. ISBN 978-3-9815774-6-4. OCLC 864601430.
- Vogt, Judith C.; Reiss, Frank (2019). Roll inclusive : Diversity und Repräsentation im Rollenspiel (in German). Feder & Schwert GmbH. ISBN 978-3-86762-405-3. OCLC 1164651416.
- Judith C., Vogt; Richter, Lena; Dodenhoeft, Kathrin; Nicolaisen, Jasper (2020). Queer*Welten Band 1 (in German). Ach je Verlag. ISBN 978-3-947720-51-4. OCLC 1155614886.
