= The Moral Virologist =

Short story by Greg Egan

- Short story by Greg Egan
- Genre: Science fiction

Publication
- Publisher: Pulphouse Magazine
- Publication date: 1990

"The Moral Virologist" is a science fiction short story by Greg Egan. It was first published in September 1990 in Pulphouse Magazine, and subsequently republished in 1991's The Best of Pulphouse, in the Summer 1993 issue of Eidolon magazine, and in Egan's 1995 collection Axiomatic. An Italian-language version, "Il Virologo Morale", was published in 2003.

== Synopsis ==
John Shawcross is a fundamentalist Christian who is disappointed that safe sex has limited the spread of HIV/AIDS, which he considers to be God's punishment for sexual immorality. Consequently, he becomes a virologist, so that he may create a new and more lethal virus. His new virus evolves in four steps by encoding the RNA of the person infected into its own, thereby rendering universal vaccination impossible. The host is killed, if their virus detects a new sexual partner or one of the same sex. Only homosexual incest between identical twins stays unpunished. John Shawcross spreads the virus and returns home, where he tries to save a prosititute by telling her the truth. She asks him what happens to babies being wrongly detected by the virus. John Shawcross first laughs because having considered this, but then realizes that breastfeeding one month after birth is still a loophole. Caught by a wave of faith, he leaves to convert the sinning mothers.

== Reception ==
Rich Horton, writing at the SF Site, calls "Virologist" "particularly memorable", while Jonathan Strahan describes it as a "standout".

Karen Burnham, writing in the New York Review of Science Fiction, however, considers Shawcross to be "cartoonish", and in her 2014 biography of Egan says that it is a "heavy-handed critique" and "obviously contrived", with "the author's thumb on the scales."

== Origin ==
Egan has described the story as "a fairly direct response to religious fundamentalists blathering on about AIDS being God's instrument".
