= 2000 in Australian literature =

This article presents a list of the historical events and publications of Australian literature during 2000.

== Events ==
- Drylands by Thea Astley and Benang by Kim Scott were joint winners of the Miles Franklin Award

== Major publications ==
=== Literary fiction ===
- Peter Carey — True History of the Kelly Gang
- Arabella Edge — The Company: The Story of a Murderer
- Rodney Hall — The Day We Had Hitler Home
- Rosalie Ham — The Dressmaker
- Thomas Keneally
  - An Angel in Australia
  - Bettany's Book
- Colleen McCullough — Morgan's Run
- Alex Miller — Conditions of Faith
- Frank Moorhouse — Dark Palace
- Morris West — The Last Confession

=== Crime and mystery ===
- Jon Cleary — Bear Pit
- Catherine Jinks — The Notary
- Dorothy Johnston — The Trojan Dog
- Andrew McGahan — Last Drinks
- Barry Maitland — Silvermeadow
- Shane Maloney — The Big Ask
- Andrew Masterson — The Second Coming
- Caroline Shaw — Eye to Eye
- Peter Temple — Dead Point
- Meredith Webber — Trust Me

=== Science fiction and fantasy ===
- Sara Douglass — The Nameless Day
- Michel Faber — Under the Skin
- Jennifer Fallon — Medalon
- Kate Forsyth — The Forbidden Land
- Ian Irvine — The Last Albatross
- Juliet Marillier — Son of the Shadows
- Sean McMullen — The Miocene Arrow
- Garth Nix
  - Castle
  - The Fall
- Emily Rodda — The Forests of Silence
- Kim Wilkins — The Resurrectionists
- Sean Williams and Shane Dix — The Dying Light

=== Children's and young adult fiction ===
- Jaclyn Moriarty — Feeling Sorry for Celia
- Sonya Hartnett — Thursday's Child
- James Moloney — Touch Me
- John Marsden — Winter
- Shaun Tan — The Lost Thing
- Markus Zusak — Fighting Ruben Wolfe

=== Short story anthologies ===
- Carmel Bird (editor) — The Penguin Century of Australian Stories

=== Poetry ===
- Rosemary Dobson – Untold Lives & Later Poems
- Brook Emery — and dug my fingers in the sand
- Dorothy Hewett and John Kinsela — Wheatlands
- John Mateer – Barefoot Speech
- Mark Reid – Parochial
- Arthur M. Spyrou – The Garden of Delights

=== Plays ===
- Hannie Rayson — Life After George
- David Williamson
  - Face to Face
  - The Great Man

=== Non-fiction ===
- Bill Bryson — Down Under
- Brian Matthews — A Fine and Private Place
- Wendy McCarthy — Don't Fence Me In
- Margaret Scott — Changing Countries: On moving from one island to another

== Awards and honours ==
- Ray Parkin, AM, "for service to Australian war literature through autobiographical works, and to historical research as author of HM Bark Endeavour

=== Lifetime achievement ===
Award	Author
Christopher Brennan Award	J. S. Harry
Patrick White Award	Thomas Shapcott

=== Literary ===
Award	Author	Title	Publisher
The Age Book of the Year Award	Amy Witting	Isobel on the Way to the Corner Shop	Penguin
ALS Gold Medal	Drusilla Modjeska	Stravinsky's Lunch	Picador
Colin Roderick Award	Peter Carey	True History of the Kelly Gang	University of Queensland Press
Nita Kibble Literary Award	Drusilla Modjeska	Stravinsky's Lunch	Picador

=== Fiction ===
==== International ====
Award	Category	Author	Title	Publisher
Commonwealth Writers' Prize	Best Novel, SE Asia and South Pacific region	Lily Brett	Too Many Men	Picador

==== National ====
Award	Author	Title	Publisher
Adelaide Festival Awards for Literature	Roger McDonald	Mr Darwin's Shooter	Vintage Books
The Age Book of the Year Award	Amy Witting	Isobel on the Way to the Corner Shop	Penguin Books
The Australian/Vogel Literary Award	Stephen Gray	The Artist is a Thief	Allen and Unwin
Kathleen Mitchell Award	Julia Leigh	The Hunter	Penguin Australia
Miles Franklin Award	Thea Astley	Drylands	Penguin Books
Miles Franklin Award	Kim Scott	Benang	Fremantle Press
New South Wales Premier's Literary Awards	Michael Meehan	The Salt of Broken Tears	Vintage Books
Queensland Premier's Literary Awards	Thea Astley	Drylands	Penguin Books
Victorian Premier's Literary Awards	Christopher Koch	Out of Ireland	Doubleday
Western Australian Premier's Book Awards	Simone Lazaroo	The Australian Fiancé	Pan Macmillan

=== Crime and Mystery ===
==== National ====
Award	Category	Author	Title	Publisher
Ned Kelly Award
Ned Kelly Award	Novel	Peter Temple	Shooting Star	Bantam Books
Ned Kelly Award	First novel	Marshall Browne	The Wooden Leg of Inspector Anders	Duffy & Snellgrove
Ned Kelly Award	True crime	John Dale	Huckstepp: A Dangerous Life	Allen & Unwin
Ned Kelly Award	True crime	Andrew Rule & John Silvester	Underbelly 3	Floradale Productions & Sly Ink
Ned Kelly Award	Lifetime Achievement	Not awarded		

=== Children and Young Adult ===
Award	Category	Author	Title	Publisher
Children's Book of the Year Award	Older Readers	Nick Earls	48 Shades of Brown	Penguin Books
Children's Book of the Year Award	Picture Book	Margaret Wild & Anne Spudvilas	Jenny Angel	Viking Books
New South Wales Premier's Literary Awards	Children's Literature	Steven Herrick	The Spangled Drongo	University of Queensland Press
New South Wales Premier's Literary Awards	Young People's Literature	Meme McDonald and Boori Monty Pryor	The Binna-Binna Man	Allen & Unwin
Victorian Premier's Prize for Young Adult Fiction		Helen Barnes	Killing Aurora	Penguin

=== Poetry ===
Award	Author	Title	Publisher
Adelaide Festival Awards for Literature	Dimitris Tsaloumas	The Harbour	University of Queensland Press
The Age Book of the Year	Peter Minter	Empty Texas	Paper Bark Press
Anne Elder Award	Arthur M. Spyrou	The Garden of Delights	Monogene
Grace Leven Prize for Poetry	Not awarded		
Mary Gilmore Award	Lucy Dougan	Memory Shell	Five Islands Press
New South Wales Premier's Literary Awards	Jennifer Maiden	Mines	Paper Bark Press
Victorian Premier's Literary Awards	John Millett	Iceman	Five Islands Press
Western Australian Premier's Book Awards	Mark Reid	Parochial	Fremantle Arts Centre Press

=== Drama ===
Award	Category	Author	Title
New South Wales Premier's Literary Awards	FilmScript	Melina Marchetta	Looking for Alibrandi
New South Wales Premier's Literary Awards	Play	Daniel Keene	Scissors, Paper, Rock
Victorian Premier's Literary Awards	Drama	Hannie Rayson	Life After George
Patrick White Playwrights' Award		Ben Ellis	Who Are You, Mr James?
Patrick White Playwrights' Award		Bette Guy	Three Men - Three Chairs
Patrick White Playwrights' Award		Ailsa Piper	Small Mercies

=== Non-fiction ===
Award	Category	Author	Title	Publisher
Adelaide Festival Awards for Literature	Non-Fiction	Tim Flannery	Throw'im Way Leg: An Adventure	Text Publishing
The Age Book of the Year	Non-Fiction	Kim Mahood	Craft for a Dry Lake	Anchor
National Biography Award	Biography	Peter Robb	M, a biography of European painter Caravaggio	Duffy and Snellgrove
National Biography Award	Biography	Mandy Sayer	Dreamtime Alice: A Memoir	Random House
Victorian Premier's Literary Awards	Non-Fiction	Adrian Caesar	The White	Picador

== Deaths ==
A list, ordered by date of death (and, if the date is either unspecified or repeated, ordered alphabetically by surname) of deaths in 2000 of Australian literary figures, authors of written works or literature-related individuals follows, including year of birth.

- 5 March – Michael Noonan, novelist and radio scriptwriter (born 1921 in New Zealand)
- 11 March – Gerald Glaskin, writer (born 1923)
- 17 March – Jack Davis, playwright, poet and Indigenous rights campaigner (born 1917)
- 6 May – Elizabeth O'Conner, novelist (born 1913)
- 25 May – Elizabeth Durack, artist and writer (born 1915)
- 16 June — Colin Roderick, editor and critic (born 1911)
- 25 June – Judith Wright, poet, environmentalist and campaigner for Aboriginal land rights (born 1915)
- 3 July – Nancy Cato, historical novelist, biographer and poet (born 1917)
- 13 July – A. D. Hope, poet and essayist (born 1907)
- August – John Joseph Jones, poet, folk singer, musician, playwright and theatre director (born in London, 1930)
- 10 August – Clement Semmler, author, literary critic, broadcaster and radio and television executive (born 1914)
- 17 August – Leslie Rees, children's writer and dramatist (born 1905)
- 1 November – Ian Moffitt, journalist and novelist (born 1926)

== See also ==
- 2000 in Australia
- 2000 in literature
- 2000 in poetry
- List of years in literature
- List of years in Australian literature
