= The Age Book of the Year Awards =

Australian literary award

The Age Book of the Year Awards were annual literary awards presented by Melbourne's The Age newspaper. The awards were first presented in 1974. After 1998, they were presented as part of the Melbourne Writers Festival. Initially, two awards were given, one for fiction (or imaginative writing), the other for non-fiction work, but in 1993, a poetry award in honour of Dinny O'Hearn was added. The criteria were that the works be "of outstanding literary merit and express Australian identity or character," and be published in the year before the award was made. One of the award-winners was chosen as The Age Book of the Year. The awards were discontinued in 2013.

In 2021 The Age Book of the Year was revived as a fiction prize, with the winner announced at the Melbourne Writers Festival. A non-fiction prize was added the following year.

== The Age Book of the Year (from 2021) ==
=== Fiction ===
The Age Book of the Year Awards winners
Year	Author	Title	Result	Ref.
2021	Robbie Arnott	The Rain Heron	Won	
2021	Steven Conte	The Tolstoy Estate	Shortlisted	
2021	Richard Flanagan	The Living Sea of Waking Dreams	Shortlisted	
2021	Kate Grenville	A Room Made of Leaves	Shortlisted	
2021	Amanda Lohrey	The Labyrinth	Shortlisted	
2021	Nardi Simpson	Song of the Crocodile	Shortlisted	
2021	Adam Thompson	Born into This	Shortlisted	
2022	Miles Allinson	In Moonland	Won	
2022	Jessica Au	Cold Enough for Snow	Shortlisted	
2022	Larissa Behrendt	After Story	Shortlisted	
2022	Brendan Colley	The Signal Line	Shortlisted	
2022	Jennifer Down	Bodies of Light	Shortlisted	
2022	Diana Reid	Love & Virtue	Shortlisted	
2023	Robbie Arnott	Limberlost	Won	
2023	Grace Chan	Every Version of You	Shortlisted	
2023	Paul Dalgarno	A Country of Eternal Light	Shortlisted	
2023	Shirley Le	Funny Ethnics	Shortlisted	
2023	Fiona McFarlane	The Sun Walks Down	Shortlisted	
2023	Alice Nelson	Faithless	Shortlisted	
2024	Tony Birch	Women & Children	Won	
2024	Stephanie Bishop	Anniversary	Shortlisted	
2024	Elise Hearst	One Day We're All Going to Die	Shortlisted	
2024	Nicholas Jose	The Idealist	Shortlisted	
2024	Charlotte Wood	Stone Yard Devotional	Shortlisted	
2024	Jessica Zhan Mei Yu	But the Girl	Shortlisted	
2025	Rodney Hall	Vortex	Won	
2025	Melanie Cheng	The Burrow	Shortlisted	
2025	David Dyer	This Kingdom of Dust	Shortlisted	
2025	Kirsty Iltners	Depth of Field	Shortlisted	
2025	Siang Lu	Ghost Cities	Shortlisted	
2025	Fiona McFarlane	Highway 13	Shortlisted	
2026	Moreno Giovannoni	The Immigrants	Won	
2026	Jennifer Mills	Salvage	Shortlisted	
2026	Omar Musa	Fierceland	Shortlisted	
2026	Leonie Norrington, Djawundil Maymuru, Merrkiyawuy Ganambarr-Stubbs and Djawa Burarrwanga	A Piece of Red Cloth	Shortlisted	
2026	Gretchen Shirm	Out of the Woods	Shortlisted	
2026	Sean Wilson	You Must Remember This	Shortlisted	

=== Non-Fiction ===
The Age Book of the Year Awards winners
Year	Author	Title	Result	Ref.
2022	Bernadette Brennan	Leaping into Waterfalls	Won	
2022	Ed Ayres	Whole Notes: Life Lessons Through Music	Shortlisted	
2022	Jonathan Butler	The Boy in the Dress	Shortlisted	
2022	Kylie Moore-Gilbert	The Uncaged Sky: My 804 Days in an Iranian Prison	Shortlisted	
2022	Karlie Noon and Krystal De Napoli	Astronomy: Sky Country	Shortlisted	
2022	Sian Prior	Childless: A Story of Freedom and Longing	Shortlisted	
2023	Kim Mahood	Wandering with Intent	Won	
2023	Cadance Bell	The All of It	Shortlisted	
2023	Shannon Burns	Childhood	Shortlisted	
2023	Peter Doyle	Suburban Noir	Shortlisted	
2023	Jess Ho	Raised by Wolves	Shortlisted	
2023	Mandy Sayer	Those Dashing McDonagh Sisters	Shortlisted	
2024	Ross McMullin	Life So Full of Promise	Won	
2024	Kate Fullagar	Bennelong & Phillip: A History Unravelled	Shortlisted	
2024	Helen Hayward	Home Work: Essays on Love and Housekeeping	Shortlisted	
2024	Matthew Lamb	Frank Moorhouse: Strange Paths	Shortlisted	
2024	Ellen van Neerven	Personal Score	Shortlisted	
2024	Rachelle Unreich	A Brilliant Life	Shortlisted	
2025	Lech Blaine	Australian Gospel	Won	
2025	Mark Raphael Baker	A Season of Death	Shortlisted	
2025	Anne Manne	Crimes of the Cross	Shortlisted	
2025	Qin Qin	Model Minority Gone Rogue	Shortlisted	
2025	Samah Sabawi	Cactus Pear for My Beloved	Shortlisted	
2025	Clare Wright	The Bark Petitions	Shortlisted	
2026	Kate Wild	The Red House	Won	
2026	Grantlee Kieza	Mr and Mrs Gould	Shortlist	
2026	Tom McIlroy	Blue Poles	Shortlist	
2026	Mark McKenna	The Shortest History of Australia	Shortlist	
2026	Josie McSkimming	Gutsy Girls	Shortlist	
2026	Drusilla Modjeska	A Woman's Eye, Her Art	Shortlist	

== The Age Book of the Year (from 1974–2012) ==
The Age Book of the Year Awards winners
Year	Author	Title	Ref.
1974	David Foster	The Pure Land	
1975	Thea Astley	A Kindness Cup	
1976	A. D. Hope	A Late Picking: Poems 1965–1974	
1976	Hugh Stretton	Capitalism, Socialism and the Environment	
1977	Not awarded		
1978	Christopher Koch	The Year of Living Dangerously	
1979	Roger McDonald	1915: A Novel of Gallipoli	
1980	David Ireland	A Woman of the Future	
1980	Murray Bail	Homesickness	
1981	Eric Charles Rolls	A Million Wild Acres	
1982	David Malouf	Fly Away Peter	
1983	Elizabeth Jolley	Mr Scobie's Riddle	
1984	Nicholas Hasluck	The Bellarmine Jug	
1985	Peter Carey	Illywhacker	
1986	Joan London	Sister Ships and Other Stories	
1987	Jessica Anderson	Stories from the Warm Zone	
1988	Frank Moorhouse	Forty-Seventeen	
1989	Marsden Hordern	Mariners are Warned: John Lort Stokes and HMA Beagle	
1990	Gwen Harwood	Blessed City	
1991	David Marr	Patrick White : A Life	
1992	Marion Halligan	Lovers' Knots	
1993	Elizabeth Jolley	The Georges' Wife	
1994	Peter Carey	The Unusual Life of Tristan Smith	
1995	Chris Wallace-Crabbe	Selected Poems : 1956–1994	
1996	Thea Astley	The Multiple Effects of Rainshadow	
1997	Peter Carey	Jack Maggs	
1998	Elliot Perlman	Three Dollars	
1999	K.S. Inglis	Sacred Places: War Memorials in the Australian Landscape	
2000	Amy Witting	Isobel on the Way to the Corner Shop	
2001	Rosemary Dobson	Untold Lives & Later Poems	
2002	Don Watson	Recollections of a Bleeding Heart: Paul Keating PM	
2003	Sonya Hartnett	Of a Boy	
2004	Luke Davies	Totem	
2005	Gay Bilson	Plenty: Digressions on Food	
2006	Jennifer Maiden	Friendly Fire	
2007	Peter Cochrane	Colonial Ambition: Foundations of Australian Democracy	
2008	Don Watson	American Journeys	
2009	Steven Amsterdam	Things We Didn't See Coming	
2010	Alex Miller	Lovesong	
2011	Fiona Kelly McGregor	Indelible Ink	
2012	James Boyce	1835: The Founding of Melbourne & the Conquest of Australia	

== Fiction (or Imaginative Writing) Award ==
=== 1974–1979 ===
Fiction (or Imaginative Writing) Award winners
Year	Author	Title	Result
1974	David Foster	The Pure Land	Winner
1975	Thea Astley	A Kindness Cup	Winner
1976	A. D. Hope	A Late Picking: Poems 1965–1974	Winner
1977	No award		
1978	Christopher Koch	The Year of Living Dangerously	Winner
1979	Roger McDonald	1915: A Novel of Gallipoli	Winner

=== 1980–1989 ===
Fiction (or Imaginative Writing) Award winners
Year	Author	Title	Result
1980	David Ireland	A Woman of the Future	Winner
1980	Murray Bail	Homesickness	Winner
1981	Blanche d'Alpuget	Turtle Beach	Winner
1982	David Malouf	Fly Away Peter	Winner
1982	Thea Astley	An Item from the Late News	Shortlist
1982	Jean Bedford	Sister Kate	Shortlist
1982	Rodney Hall	Just Relations	Shortlist
1982	David Malouf	Child's Play	Shortlist
1982	Gerald Murnane	The Plains	Shortlist
1983	Elizabeth Jolley	Mr Scobie's Riddle	Winner
1983	Robert Drewe	The Bodysurfers	Shortlist
1983	Colin Johnson	Doctor Wooreddy's Prescription for Enduring the Ending of the World	Shortlist
1983	Peter Kocan	The Cure	Shortlist
1983	Les Murray	The People's Otherworld : Poems	Shortlist
1984	Nicholas Hasluck	The Bellarmine Jug	Winner
1984	Alan Gould	The Man Who Stayed Below	Shortlist
1984	T. A. G. Hungerford	Stories From Suburban Road	Shortlist
1984	David Malouf	Harland's Half Acre	Shortlist
1984	Olga Masters	Loving Daughters	Shortlist
1984	Roger Milliss	Serpent's Tooth	Shortlist
1984	Tim Winton	Shallows	Shortlist
1985	Peter Carey	Illywhacker	Winner
1985	Beverley Farmer	Home Time	Shortlist
1985	David Foster	Dog Rock	Shortlist
1985	Helen Garner	The Children's Bach	Shortlist
1985	Robert Gray	Selected Poems 1963-1983	Shortlist
1985	Thomas Keneally	A Family Madness	Shortlist
1985	C. J. Koch	The Doubleman	Shortlist
1985	Geoff Page	Benton's Conviction	Shortlist
1986	Joan London	Sister Ships and Other Stories	Winner
1986	Lily Brett	The Auschwitz Poems	Shortlist
1986	John Clanchy	Lie of the Land	Shortlist
1986	Helen Garner	Postcards from Surfers	Shortlist
1986	Archie Weller	Going Home	Shortlist
1987	Jessica Anderson	Stories from the Warm Zone	Winner
1988	Frank Moorhouse	Forty-Seventeen	Winner
1989	Elizabeth Jolley	My Father's Moon	Winner

=== 1990–1999 ===
Fiction (or Imaginative Writing) Award winners
Year	Author	Title	Result
1990	Glenda Adams	Longleg	Winner
1991	Brian Castro	Double-Wolf	Winner
1992	Marion Halligan	Lovers' Knots	Winner
1993	Elizabeth Jolley	The Georges' Wife	Winner
1993	Liam Davison	Soundings	Shortlist
1993	Fotini Epanomitis	The Mule's Foal	Shortlist
1993	Dorothy Hewett	The Toucher	Shortlist
1994	Peter Carey	The Unusual Life of Tristan Smith	Winner
1994	Thea Astley	Coda	Shortlist
1994	Liam Davison	The White Woman	Shortlist
1994	Adib Khan	Seasonal Adjustments	Shortlist
1995	Rod Jones	Billy Sunday	Winner
1995	Carmel Bird	The White Garden	Shortlist
1995	Richard Flanagan	Death of a River Guide	Shortlist
1995	Gillian Mears	The Grass Sister	Shortlist
1995	Alex Miller	The Sitters	Shortlist
1996	Thea Astley	The Multiple Effects of Rainshadow	Winner
1996	Robert Dessaix	Night Letters	Shortlist
1996	Robert Drewe	The Drowner	Shortlist
1996	David Foster	The Glade Within the Grove	Shortlist
1996	Rodney Hall	The Island in the Mind	Shortlist
1996	David Malouf	The Conversations at Curlow Creek	Shortlist
1997	Peter Carey	Jack Maggs	Winner
1997	David Ireland	The Chosen	Shortlist
1997	Brian Castro	Stepper	Shortlist
1997	Delia Falconer	The Service of Clouds	Shortlist
1998	Elliot Perlman	Three Dollars	Winner
1998	Roger McDonald	Mr. Darwin's Shooter	Shortlist
1998	Alan Gould	The Tazyrik Year	Shortlist
1998	Marion Halligan	The Golden Dress	Shortlist
1998	Murray Bail	Eucalyptus	Shortlist
1999	James Bradley	The Deep Field	Winner

=== 2000–2009 ===
Fiction (or Imaginative Writing) Award winners
Year	Author	Title	Result
2000	Amy Witting	Isobel on the Way to the Corner Shop	Winner
2001	Peter Carey	True History of the Kelly Gang	Winner
2002	Joan London	Gilgamesh	Winner
2003	Sonya Hartnett	Of a Boy	Winner
2004	Andrew McGahan	The White Earth	Winner
2005	Gail Jones	Sixty Lights	Winner
2006	Christos Tsiolkas	Dead Europe	Winner
2007	David Malouf	Every Move You Make	Winner
2008	Tim Winton	Breath	Winner
2008	J. M. Coetzee	Diary of a Bad Year	Shortlist
2008	Mireille Juchau	Burning In	Shortlist
2008	Sara Knox	The Orphan Gunner	Shortlist
2008	Joan London	The Good Parents	Shortlist
2009	Steven Amsterdam	Things We Didn't See Coming	Winner

=== 2010–2012 ===
Fiction (or Imaginative Writing) Award winners
Year	Author	Title	Result
2010	Alex Miller	Lovesong	Winner
2010	Peter Carey	Parrot and Olivier in America	Shortlist
2010	J. M. Coetzee	Summertime	Shortlist
2010	Cate Kennedy	The World Beneath	Shortlist
2010	G. L. Osborne	Clouds of Magellan	Shortlist
2011	Fiona Kelly McGregor	Indelible Ink	Winner
2012	Gillian Mears	Foal's Bread	Winner
2012	Steven Amsterdam	What the Family Needed	Shortlist
2012	Mark Dapin	Spirit House	Shortlist
2012	Deborah Forster	The Meaning of Grace	Shortlist
2012	Janette Turner Hospital	Forecast : Turbulence	Shortlist

== Non-fiction Award ==
=== 1974–1979 ===
Non-fiction Award winners
Year	Author	Title	Result
1974	Manning Clark	A History of Australia (Vol. 3)	Winner
1975	Not awarded		
1976	Hugh Stretton	Capitalism, Socialism and the Environment	Winner
1977	Not awarded		
1978	Patsy Adam-Smith	The Anzacs	Winner
1979	Not awarded		

=== 1980–1989 ===
Non-fiction Award winners
Year	Author	Title	Result
1980	Not awarded		
1981	Eric Charles Rolls	A Million Wild Acres	Winner
1982	Geoffrey Serle	John Monash: A Biography	Winner
1982	Blanche d'Alpuget	Robert J. Hawke	Shortlist
1982	Bruce Grant	Gods and Politicians	Shortlist
1982	Harold Love	The Golden Age of Australian Opera	Shortlist
1982	Leslie Marchant	France Australe	Shortlist
1983	Lloyd Robson	A History of Tasmania	Winner
1983	Mary Albertus Bain	Full Fathom Five	Shortlist
1983	Leonard Bickel	Shackleton's Forgotten Argonauts	Shortlist
1983	Vincent Buckley	Cutting Green Hay	Shortlist
1983	Mary Durack	Sons in the Saddle	Shortlist
1983	A. F. Howells	Against the Stream	Shortlist
1983	Ken Inglis	This is the ABC	Shortlist
1984	John Rickard	HB Higgins: The Rebel and Judge	Winner
1984	Margaret Hazzard	Punishment Short of Death	Shortlist
1984	Janet McCalman	Struggletown	Shortlist
1984	Ross McMullin	Will Dyson	Shortlist
1984	Craig Munro	Wild Man of Letters	Shortlist
1984	Bernard Smith	The Boy Adeodatus	Shortlist
1984	Francis West	Gilbert Murray	Shortlist
1985	Chester Eagle	Mapping the Paddocks	Winner
1985	Hugh Lunn	Vietnam: A Reporter's War	Winner
1985	Vincent Buckley	Memory Ireland	Shortlist
1985	T. A. G. Hungerford	A Knockabout with a Slouch Hat	Shortlist
1985	Jim Marwood	Valley People	Shortlist
1985	Desmond O'Grady	Raffaelo! Raffaelo!	Shortlist
1985	E. M. Webster	The Moon Man	Shortlist
1986	Garry Kinnane	George Johnston: A Biography	Winner
1986	Terry Burstall	The Soldiers' Story	Shortlist
1986	E. E. Dunlop	The War Diaries of Weary Dunlop	Shortlist
1986	Mungo MacCallum	Plankton's Luck	Shortlist
1986	John Pilger	Heroes	Shortlist
1987	Robert Hughes	The Fatal Shore	Winner
1988	Robin Gerster	Big-Noting: The Heroic Theme in Australian War Writing	Winner
1989	Marsden Hordern	Mariners are Warned!: John Lort Stokes and HMS Beagle in Australia 1837–1843	Winner

=== 1990–1999 ===
Non-fiction Award winners
Year	Author	Title	Result
1990	Gwen Harwood	Blessed City	Winner
1991	David Marr	Patrick White : A Life	Winner
1992	Ruth Park	A Fence Around the Cuckoo	Winner
1993	Janet McCalman	Journeyings	Winner
1993	John Foster	Take Me to Paris, Johnny	Shortlist
1993	Hazel Rowley	Christina Stead	Shortlist
1994	Jim Davidson	Lyrebird Rising	Winner
1994	Judith Allen	Rose Scott	Shortlist
1994	Brenda Niall	Georgiana	Shortlist
1994	Bernard Smith	Noel Counihan : Artist and Revolutionary	Shortlist
1995	Tim Flannery	The Future Eaters	Winner
1995	Robyn Annear	Bearbrass	Shortlist
1995	Helen Garner	The First Stone	Shortlist
1995	Gideon Haigh	One Summer, Every Summer	Shortlist
1995	Mark Peel	Good Times, Hard Times	Shortlist
1996	Geoffrey Serle	Robin Boyd: A Life	Winner
1997	Roberta Sykes	Snake Cradle	Winner
1997	Alan Atkinson	The Europeans in Australia	Shortlist
1997	Mark Baker	The Fiftieth Gate	Shortlist
1998	Stuart MacIntyre	The Reds	Winner
1998	Anna Rosner Blay	Sister, Sister	Shortlist
1998	Veronica Brady	South of My Days	Shortlist
1998	Raimond Gaita	Romulus My Father	Shortlist
1999	K.S. Inglis	Sacred Places: War Memorials in the Australian Landscape	Winner

=== 2000–2009 ===
Non-fiction Award winners
Year	Author	Title	Result
2000	Kim Mahood	Craft for a Dry Lake	Winner
2001	Nadia Wheatley	The Life and Myth of Charmian Clift	Winner
2002	Don Watson	Recollections of a Bleeding Heart: Paul Keating Prime Minister	Winner
2003	Ann Galbally	Charles Condor: The Last Bohemian	Winner
2004	Peter Robb	A Death in Brazil	Winner
2005	Gay Bilson	Plenty: Digressions on Food	Winner
2006	Mandy Sayer	Velocity	Winner
2007	Peter Cochrane	Colonial Ambition: Foundations of Australian Democracy	Winner
2008	Don Watson	American Journeys	Winner
2009	Guy Rundle	Down to the Crossroads	Winner

=== 2010–2012 ===
Non-fiction Award winners
Year	Author	Title	Result
2010	Kate Howarth	Ten Hail Marys	Winner
2010	Sandy Jeffs	Flying with Paper Wings	Shortlist
2010	Ros Moriarty	Listening to Country	Shortlist
2010	Anne Summers	The Lost Mother	Shortlist
2010	Maria Tumarkin	Otherland	Shortlist
2011	Jim Davidson	A Three-Cornered Life	Winner
2012	James Boyce	1835: The Founding of Melbourne & the Conquest of Australia	Winner
2012	Jane Gleeson-White	Double Entry	Shortlist
2012	Paul Ham	Hiroshima Nagasaki	Shortlist
2012	Adrian Hyland	Kinglake-350	Shortlist
2012	Tony Taylor	Fishing the River of Time	Shortlist

== Dinny O'Hearn Poetry Prize ==
=== 1993–1999 ===
Dinny O'Hearn Poetry Prize winners
Year	Author	Title	Result
1993	John Tranter	At the Florida	Winner
1993	Barry Hill	Ghosting William Buckley	Shortlist
1993	Rhyll McMaster	On My Empty Feet	Shortlist
1993	Peter Rose	The Catullan Rag	Shortlist
1994	Dorothy Porter	The Monkey's Mask	Winner
1994	Philip Hodgins	Dispossessed	Shortlist
1994	Jennifer Maiden	Acoustic Shadow	Shortlist
1994	Kathleen Stewart	Snow	Shortlist
1995	Chris Wallace-Crabbe	Selected Poems : 1956–1994	Winner
1995	Robert Gray	New and Selected Poems	Shortlist
1995	Kevin Hart	New and Selected Poems	Shortlist
1995	Rhyll McMaster	Flying the Coop: New and Selected Poems 1972–1974	Shortlist
1995	Les Murray	Collected Poems	Shortlist
1995	Peter Porter	Millennial Fables	Shortlist
1995	Vivian Smith	New Selected Poems	Shortlist
1996	Eric Beach	Weeping for Lost Babylon	Winner
1996	Judith Beveridge	Accidental Grace	Shortlist
1996	Grant Caldwell	You Know What I Mean	Shortlist
1996	Anthony Lawrence	The Viewfinder	Shortlist
1997	Emma Lew	The Wild Reply	Winner
1997	Peter Porter	Dragons in Their Pleasant Palaces	Winner
1998	John Kinsella	The Hunt and Other Poems	Winner
1998	Merlinda Bobis	Summer Was a Fast Train Without Terminals	Shortlist
1998	Diane Fahey	Listening to a Far Sea	Shortlist
1998	Anthony Lawrence	New and Selected Poems	Shortlist
1998	Andrew Sant	Album of Domestic Exiles	Shortlist
1999	R. A. Simpson	The Impossible, and Other Poems	Winner

=== 2000–2009 ===
Dinny O'Hearn Poetry Prize winners
Year	Author	Title	Result
2000	Peter Minter	Empty Texas	Winner
2001	Rosemary Dobson	Untold Lives & Later Poems	Winner
2002	Robert Gray	Afterimages	Winner
2003	Laurie Duggan	Mangroves	Winner
2004	Luke Davies	Totem	Winner
2005	Dipti Saravanamuttu	The Colosseum	Winner
2006	Jennifer Maiden	Friendly Fire	Winner
2007	Robert Adamson	The Goldfinches of Baghdad	Winner
2008	J. S. Harry	Not Finding Wittgenstein	Winner
2008	John Kinsella	Shades of the Sublime and the Beautiful	Shortlist
2008	Anthony Lawrence	Bark	Shortlist
2008	David Malouf	Typewriter Music	Shortlist
2008	Tracy Ryan	Scar Revision	Shortlist
2009	Peter Porter	Better Than God	Winner

=== 2010–2012 ===
Dinny O'Hearn Poetry Prize winners
Year	Author	Title	Result
2010	Jennifer Maiden	Pirate Rain	Winner
2010	Ken Bolton	A Whistled Bit of Bop	Shortlist
2010	Pam Brown	Authentic Local	Shortlist
2010	Les Murray	Taller When Prone	Shortlist
2010	Homer Rieth	Wimmera	Shortlist
2011	John Tranter	Starlight: 150 Poems	Winner
2012	Mal McKimmie	The Brokenness Sonnets I-III And Other Poems	Winner
2012	Kate Fagan	First Light	Shortlist
2012	Anthony Lawrence	The Welfare of My Enemy	Shortlist
2012	Rhyll McMaster	Late Night Shopping	Shortlist
2012	Jaya Savige	Surface to Air	Shortlist

== First Book ==
- 2005: The Unknown Zone by Phil Smith
