= Sydney Writers' Festival =

Annual literary festival held in Sydney, Australia

- Genre: Literary festival
- Begins: May
- Frequency: Annual
- Locations: Sydney, New South Wales, Australia
- Years active: 29
- Inaugurated: 1997
- Participants: 300
- Attendance: 100,000
- Website: www.swf.org.au

The Sydney Writers' Festival (SWF) is an annual literary festival held in Sydney in May, with the inaugural festival taking place in 1997. The 2020 event was cancelled due to the COVID-19 pandemic in Australia.

== History ==
The festival began in January 1997, with most events initially held at the State Library of New South Wales. The first independent Sydney Writers' Festival ran from 12 to 17 May 1998, with 169 participants appearing in venues in, and around, the centre of Sydney.

Since then, the Festival has rapidly expanded. Events have also been held at venues stretching across Sydney, including Roslyn Packer Theatre, Sydney Town Hall, City Recital Hall, and Sydney Opera House. Events are also regularly held in regional and suburban locations including Parramatta, Ashfield, Auburn, Blacktown, Bankstown, Campbelltown, Hornsby, Penrith, Blue Mountains and Wollongong.

The Festival moved from Walsh Bay to Carriageworks in May 2018 (as Walsh Bay was undergoing a major refurbishment).

The 2020 event was cancelled due to the COVID-19 pandemic in Australia.

== Event ==
Now held mid-to-late May each year, the Festival involves over 400 participants and presents over 300 events. Approximately one-third of all Sydney Writers' Festival events are free of charge. Festival attendances have reached over 90,000 each year since 2007.

Russ the Story Bus is managed by the Sydney Writers Festival, and is part of the event every year.

== Committee ==
=== Chairs of SWF ===
Past and present chairs of the festival include:

- 1997–2000: Geraldine Doogue
- Late 2000–Dec 2011: Sandra Yates AO
- Jan 2012–Jan 2018: Deena Shiff
- Feb 2018– : Mark Scott

=== Artistic directors ===
Artistic directors for festival years include:

- 1998: John Nieuwenhuizen, with Meredith Curnow the Program Director. Meredith Curnow became Festival Director for the period *1999–2002: Meredith Curnow
- 2003–2006: Caro Llewellyn (AD & CEO)
- 2007-2009: Wendy Were (AD & CEO)
- 2010–2012: Chip Rolley
- 2013–2016: Jemma Birrell
- 2017–2020: Michaela McGuire (appointed November 2016)
- 2021–2022 : Michael Williams, interim director (since August 2020)
- 2022–2026 : Ann Mossop
- 2026– : Tamara Zimet

=== Executive directors ===
- 2009–2014: Ben Strout
- 2015: Jo Dyer ED from 2015; promoted to CEO in November 2016, when she also joined the Festival board of directors.
- 2018–2021: Chrissy Sharp, CEO
- 2021– Brooke Webb

== Past international guests ==
Past guests have included:

- 1999 – Alan Duff, and Peter Porter
- 2002 – Jodi Picoult, Lloyd Jones, Giles Milton and Neil Hanson
- 2003 – Antony Beevor, Jonathan Franzen, Catherine Millet, Janette Turner Hospital, Nicholas Shakespeare, and CK Stead
- 2004 – Alan Bennett, Alain de Botton, Hilary Mantel, Tim Krabbe, Susanna Moore, Jane Campion, Louis de Bernières, Salam Pax, John W. Dean, Harvey Pekar, Alexei Sayle, ZZ Packer, and David Sedaris
- 2005 – Lewis Lapham, Alan Hollinghurst, Deirdre Bair, Professor Harold Bloom, Tariq Ali, David Suzuki, Jared Diamond, Suad Amiry, Michael Winter, Colin McAdam and Miriam Toews
- 2006 – Naomi Wolf, Anna Politkovskaya, Michael Burleigh, Andy Borowitz, Susan Orlean, Aleksandar Hemon, Hendrik Hertzberg, Mark Danner, Haifa Zangana, John Banville, Edmund White, and Maya Angelou
- 2007 – Andrew O'Hagan, Ayaan Hirsi Ali, Bei Dao, Will Hutton, Antony Beevor, William Dalyrmple, Lionel Shriver, Richard Ford, Andrei Makine, Rachel Seiffert, Mohsin Hamid and Steven Hall
- 2008 – Jon Lee Anderson, Andrew J. Bacevich, Michael Pollan, John Gray, and Jeanette Winterson
- 2009 – Chimamanda Ngozi Adichie, Alex Ross, and Kazuo Ishiguro
- 2010 – John Carey, Colm Tóibín, Lionel Shriver, Yiyun Li, John Ralston Saul, Bill McKibben, and Raj Patel
- 2011 – Ingrid Betancourt, Howard Jacobson, A. A. Gill, Anthony Bourdain, Téa Obreht, Izzeldin Abuelaish, Kei Miller, Kader Abdolah, Michael Cunningham, David Mitchell, AC Grayling, Michael Connelly, Gail Dines, and Daniel Altman
- 2012 – Hisham Matar, Jeffrey Eugenides, Dava Sobel
- 2013 – Molly Ringwald, Ruby Wax, Claire Messud
- 2014 – Irvine Welsh, Vince Gilligan, Alice Walker
- 2015 – Michael Connelly, Anthony Horowitz, Douglas Coupland, Norman Doidge, Alan Cumming, Atul Gawande, David Walliams, Michael Frayn, James Patterson (out of season event)
- 2016 – Gloria Steinem, Jonathan Franzen, Marlon James, Julian Barnes, William Boyd, Jeanette Winterson, Kae Tempest, Yanis Varoufakis, Hanya Yanagihara, Paul Muldoon, Yeonmi Park
- 2017 – Anne Enright, Henry Marsh, Ian Rankin, George Saunders, A. N. Wilson
- 2018 – André Aciman, Min Jin Lee, Alexis Okeowo, Masha Gessen, Jennifer Egan, Tayari Jones
- 2019 – Fatima Bhutto, Rachel Kushner, Susan Orlean, George Saunders, Nana Kwame Adjei-Brenyah, Meg Wolitzer, Akala, Andrew Sean Greer, Alexander Chee

== Past local guests ==
- 1997 – Robert Dessaix, Andrew McGahan, Matthew Condon, Bernard Cohen, Christos Tsiolkas, Gillian Mears
- 2001 – Lee Tulloch
- 2002 – Geoffrey Atherden, Bernard Cohen
- 2003 – Sonya Hartnett, David Malouf, Danny Katz, Louis Nowra
- 2005 – Bob Carr and John Kinsella
- 2006 – Alex Miller, Robert Drewe, Kate Grenville, Les Murray, Tegan Bennett Daylight, Peter Singer, Tim Flannery, Gail Jones
- 2007 – Raimond Gaita
- 2008 – Mem Fox, Peter van Onselen, Michelle de Kretser, Gail Jones, Drusilla Modjeska
- 2009 – Elizabeth Farrelly
- 2010 – Peter Carey, Les Murray, Alex Miller, Ross Garnaut, Clive Hamilton
- 2011 – Suelette Dreyfus, Annette Shun Wah, David Hicks
- 2012 – Kathy Lette
- 2013 – Brendan Cowell, Elizabeth Farrelly, Claudia Karvan,
- 2014 – Christos Tsiolkas, Michelle de Kretser, Robert Dessaix
- 2015 – Richard Flanagan, Annabel Crabb, Leigh Sales, Helen Garner, David Malouf, Les Murray, Andy Griffiths, Julia Gillard
- 2016 – Elizabeth Harrower, Anna Funder, Magda Szubanski, Stan Grant, Kerry O'Brien, Bob Brown, Charlotte Wood
- 2017 – Julia Baird, Jimmy Barnes, Peter Corris, Clementine Ford, Liane Moriarty
- 2018 – Michelle de Kretser, Jane Harper, Helen Garner, Christos Tsiolkas, Julia Gillard
- 2019
- 2021- Melissa Lucashenko, Tara June Winch, Evelyn Araluen (Opening Night)
- 2022
- 2023 - Alexis Wright, Patrick Abboud, Thomas Hedley, Kate McClymont, Ghassan Hage

== Closing address ==
- 2011 James Gleick 'Perish the thought'
- 2012 Dava Sobel
- 2013 Claire Messud
- 2014 Emma Donoghue
- 2015 Helen Macdonald
- 2016 Hanya Yanagihara
- 2017 Susan Faludi
- 2018 Jennifer Egan
- 2019 Fatima Bhutto
- 2020
- 2021
- 2022
- 2023 Richard Flanagan

== Organisational structure ==
The festival is led by CEO Brooke Webb and programmed by the Artistic Director, Ann Mossop. Sydney Writers' Festival Limited is a not-for-profit company with an independent board of directors.

== See also ==
- List of festivals in Australia
- New South Wales Premier's Literary Awards
- Man Booker International Prize – 2011
- Sydney Writers Walk
