= Melbourne Writers Festival =

Annual literary festival held in Melbourne, Australia

Coordinates: 37.817798°S 144.968714°E

Melbourne Writers Festival (MWF) is an annual literary festival held in the Australian city of Melbourne, a UNESCO City of Literature. The Festival runs during early September each year. Melbourne Writers Festival is part of the Word Alliance, a partnership of eight international literary festivals which support and showcase the work of writers.

In 2020, MWF was impacted by the COVID-19 pandemic and subsequently ran an entirely digital program, curated by Associate Director, Gene Smith. In September 2020, the Melbourne Writers Festival appointed Michaela McGuire to the role of Artistic Director, replacing Marieke Hardy who created the 2018 and 2019 festivals.

== History ==
MWF was founded in 1986 as a joint initiative between the Melbourne International Festival of the Arts and the City of Melbourne. It was organised as a sister festival to the Spoleto Festival, and was known in the first year as Spoleto Melbourne Festival of Three Worlds. It was held at the Athenaeum Theatre. The Victorian Premier's Literary Awards were presented as part of the festival for the first time.

In 1990, the Festival was no longer known under the Spoleto name, and became a part of the Melbourne International Arts Festival. It also moved venues from the Athenaeum and Kino Cinemas to the Malthouse Theatre. By 1992 the festival had over 10,000 attendees, and expanded its program to include events in Ballarat. Simon Clews was appointed the new Festival Director, a post he held until 2005. The inaugural Keynote Address was given by Clive James in 1996 to coincide with the festival's 10th anniversary celebrations.

In 1998 the Festival was held autonomously from the Melbourne International Arts Festival, taking place in August rather than October. The Age newspaper became the Festival's principal sponsor, taking the name 'The Age Melbourne Writers Festival'. The Age Book of the Year Awards replaced the Premier's Literary Awards which stayed with the International Arts festival.

By 2001 the Festival had instituted Internet broadcasts and transcripts of some sessions, Auslan at others, and was attracting an estimated 25,000 in attendances. over the 10 days of the festival. In 2002, 'The Last Word' was introduced as a counterpoint to the Keynote address that opens the Festival. That year, a parody of the Festival program appeared that mocked the festival's programming as being elitist, conservative, and closely aligned with the sales-driven imperatives of publishers. In 2004 the Festival venues expanded to include the Heide Museum of Modern Art and the State Library of Victoria. 2005 saw the 20th anniversary celebrations of the Festival, and a collaboration with the Australian Centre for the Moving Image that continues today.

Rosemary Cameron replaced Simon Clews as Festival Director in late 2005. There was a 60% growth in the number of events held, which expanded to include workshops and master classes. Events were held at Federation Square for the first time, and the Festival commissioned the Playworks Theatre Company to produce four one-act plays to be performed during the Festival. An 'Empty Chair' was instituted to represent those writers unable to attend due to persecution. It became a precursor to the political nature of the Festival in 2006, with the Last Word debate over the Aboriginal Stolen Generation producing much controversy. In 2007, the Festival was carbon neutral and continued to show a growth in program and audiences, with the schools program reaching more than 7,000 students. This was also the last year for the Festival at the CUB Malthouse Theatre.

In 2008, MWF was moved to Federation Square. Using the BMW Edge and the two ACMI cinemas, the Festival also set up its own box office, and increased audiences by 12.5% to 45,000, with income increasing by 40%. With a bigger program, 20% of the program was free. The partnership with The Age was reworked and the Festival removed The Age from its designation. In 2009, visits increased to 50,000. Bernhard Schlink was the keynote speaker, and the Big Ideas at the RMIT Capitol Theatre hosted such guests as Christine Nixon, Tony Abbott, Paul Kelly, Bob Stein, Bill Kelty and Antony Beevor. The schools program grew from 10,700 to 12,000 students, and a songwriters stream took place at Toff in Town. In 2009 Steve Grimwade became the Festival's Director through until his last MWF in 2012.
2014 saw MWF host about 400 writers and count over 54,000 attendances. Festival Director, Lisa Dempster shifted the Festival's focus to 'democratising literature'.

I am all about – hopefully not sounding too grandiose – the democratisation of literature. Capital 'L' literature is very important and it's long been fostered by MWF but people read in all different kinds of ways in this day and age, so I really want to make sure our festival program reaches a wide variety of people. Even people who don't necessarily consider themselves to be bookish. Dempster said to the Sydney Morning Herald.

The Festival began a new initiative in 2015, 'Audience Advocates' which saw twelve members of the public selected from an open call-out to help shape the 2015 program. 2015 saw the 30th anniversary of the Festival with a massive program of over 580 events across more than 70 venues, attracting an audience of more than 60,000. The Festival also ran a special 30 Under 30 program to celebrate young writers.

The 2016 Festival explored the theme of identity, with a particular focus on Australian identity and writing. Local writer Maxine Beneba Clarke opened the Festival to a standing ovation, and was followed by the presentation of the Miles Franklin Literary Award. The Festival also expanded outside the city centre, with special events held in Footscray and Dandenong, and through a Local Libraries program reaching across 16 suburbs.

In 2018, Marieke Hardy was appointed Artistic Director for a three-year term. Hardy's approach to programming was to turn the traditional book festival on its head, presenting storytelling through theatre, songwriting and performance. Hardy's first year saw MWF's largest box office results in its history.

In 2019, MWF signed a partnership with the State Library of Victoria to create a new home and literary precinct around the Swanston Street area of the Library.

== Program ==
Over the years, MWF has included many different programming streams. Below is a selection of these:

Keynotes High-profile writers and intellectuals from across the world come to Melbourne to share thought-provoking insights. Previous speakers have included Richard Flanagan, Germaine Greer, Robert Dessaix and Simon Callow.

Art and Design MWF features numerous artists, including book illustrators such as Shaun Tan, and cartoonists such as New Yorker Roz Chast. Each day of the Festival, an artist in residence can be observed working in Federation Square.

Big Ideas A series that brings together public intellectuals to discuss challenging contemporary ideas. Previous speakers include Michael Kirby, Marcia Langton and Kwame Anthony Appiah.

Literature Fiction and non-fiction writers, biographers and poets, graphic novelists and journalists discuss their influences and writing experiences, launch new books and present readings. Guests include Anna Funder, Jonathan Franzen, and Joss Whedon.

Music and Performance The Festival hosts performances from spoken-word poets and musicians. PJ Harvey, Libbi Gorr, Angie Hart and Collider have all performed at the Festival.

Families and Children Activities Readings and workshops for kids and families are run each weekend of the Festival. The 2016 Festival also included a special Roald Dahl Day of events and activities celebrating the 100th anniversary of the storyteller's birth.

Schools' Program A special program of student-targeted events runs for four days during the Festival. Children and Young Adult authors and illustrators such as Rainbow Rowell, David Levithan, Paul Jennings, and Andy Griffiths have appeared at Schools' Program events.

Professional Development The Festival runs numerous seminars and masterclasses for writers, speakers and artists. Workshop and seminar guests have included John Freeman, Alice Pung, Carrie Tiffany, The Moth, and Morris Gleitzman.

== Past international guests ==
Past International guests have included Isabel Allende, John Ashbery, Margaret Atwood, Louis de Bernières, Alain de Botton, Melvyn Bragg, André Brink, Bill Bryson, A. S. Byatt, Angela Carter, Paulo Coelho, J. M. Coetzee, Douglas Coupland, Molly Crabapple, Justin Cronin, Andrew Davies, Roddy Doyle, Dave Eggers, Ophira Eisenberg, Angela Flournoy, Richard Ford, Tavi Gevinson, A. C. Grayling, Lev Grossman, Luke Harding, PJ Harvey, Seamus Heaney, Steve Hely, Oscar Hijuelos, Joshua Ip, Elizabeth Jolley, Terry Jones, Robert Jordan, Elizabeth Kolbert, David Levithan, Yann Martel, Frank McCourt, Robert Muchamore, Edna O'Brien, Ben Okri, Maria Popova, Annie Proulx, Rainbow Rowell, Ian Rankin, Ruth Rendell, Salman Rushdie, Louis Sachar, Alexei Sayle, Will Self, Vikram Seth, Lionel Shriver, Zadie Smith, Tracy K. Smith, Graham Swift, Joanna Trollope and Xue Xinran.

== Past local guests ==
Past local guests have included Yassmin Abdel-Mageid, Thea Astley, Peter Carey, Maxine Beneba Clarke, Robert Drewe, Nick Earls, Richard Flanagan, Tim Flannery, Helen Garner, Morris Gleitzman, Germaine Greer, Kate Grenville, Andy Griffiths, Marion Halligan, Clive James, Danny Katz, Thomas Keneally, Hannah Kent, Mark Latham, Kathy Lette, Joan London, Shane Maloney, David Malouf, Robert Manne, Melina Marchetta, Drusilla Modjeska, Les Murray, Dorothy Porter, Henry Reynolds, Anne Summers, Peter Temple and Tim Winton.

== Keynote addresses ==
1996 Clive James 'The Idea of a National Culture'
1997 Germaine Greer 'Sex, Angst and the Millennium'
1998 Paul Davies 'Aliens: Are They Really Out there?'
1999 Geoffrey Robertson
2000 Patrick Dodson
2001 Bill Bryson 'Notes From all Over'
2002 Oliver Sacks 'Stinks and Bangs: A Chemical Boyhood'
2003 Tariq Ali 'War, Empire, Resistance: Welcome to the 21st Century
2004 José Ramos-Horta 'War and Peace, The Middle East and Iraq Cauldrons, Fundamentalism, Terrorism – Is there Hope?'
2005 John Ralston Saul CC 'Collapse of Globalism'
2006 Tim Flannery on Global Warming
2007 Clive James 'Our inextinguishable fortune'
2008 Germaine Greer 'On Rage'
2009 Bernhard Schlink 'Guilt about the Past'
2010 Joss Whedon 'From Buffy to Dr Horrible, Infinity and Beyond'
2011 Jonathan Franzen 'On Autobiographical Fiction', Shaun Tan 'The Arrival'
2012 Simon Callow 'Charles Dickens and the Great Theatre of the World'
2013 Boris Johnson 'An Audience with Boris Johnson'
2014 Helen Garner 'This House of Grief' and Salman Rushdie 'Freedom to Write'
2015 Louis de Bernières 'The Dust That Falls From Dreams'
2016 Maxine Beneba Clarke

== Closing addresses ==
2002 Germaine Greer 'Sex, lies and Secret Women's Business'
2003 Annie Proulx 'Conversations with Annie Proulx'
2004 Irshad Manji 'Confessions of a Muslim Reformer: Why I Fight for Women, Jews and Pluralism'
2005 Julian Burnside, Geoffrey Robertson, Brendan Kilty SC 'Whatever happened to Human Rights?'
2006 Debates. Robert Manne vs Andrew Bolt, John Hirst Moderator 'Stolen generation or hijacked history?' and Steve Pratt vs John Martinkus, Max Gillies Moderator 'Dealing with the Devil'
2007 Debates David Marr and Rob Watts v Graham Freudenberg, Sally Warhaft and Tom Bentley 'Policy is the Craft of Liars'
2008 Emily Maguire, Monica Dux, Catharine Lumby and Susan Maushart 'From Friedan to Feminists'
2009 Tony Abbott and Paul Kelly 'The Forging of Modern Australia'
2010 Jan Schaffer 'The New News'
2011 Richard Flanagan 'The Decline of Love and the Rise of Non-Freedom'
2012 Robert Dessaix 'The Time of Our Lives'
2013 Marina Warner 'Stranger Magic'
2014 Dave Eggers
2015 Will Self
2016 Lionel Shriver

== Patrons and board of directors ==
Founding patron

The Hon. John Button

Patrons

The Hart Line Fund
Maria & Allan J Myers AO QC

Board

Chair: John Jerome Myers
Deputy Chair: Jayne Dullard
Treasurer: Fahim Ahad
Secretary: Jill Campbell
Committee: Jamila Rizvi, Karen Monaghan, Phillip Benedetti

Past board directors include Michael Webster, Mark Rubbo, Helen Garner, Bernard Marin and Claire Dobbin.

== See also ==
- List of festivals in Australia
- Victorian Premier's Literary Award
- The Age Book of the Year
