= 1915 (disambiguation) =

1915 was a common year starting on Friday of the Gregorian calendar.

1915 may also refer to:

- 1915 (film), a 2015 American psychological thriller film
- 1915 (miniseries), an Australian historical drama television miniseries
- 1915: A Novel of Gallipoli, a novel by Roger McDonald
