= The Ballad of Desmond Kale =

2005 novel by Roger McDonald

- First edition
- Author: Roger McDonald
- Language: English
- Genre: Novel
- Publisher: Vintage, Australia
- Publication date: 2005
- Publication place: Australia
- Media type: Print (Paperback)
- Pages: 638
- ISBN: 1-74166-114-5
- OCLC: 225200464
- Preceded by: Mr Darwin's Shooter
- Followed by: When Colts Ran

The Ballad of Desmond Kale is a Miles Franklin Award-winning novel by Australian author Roger McDonald.

== Dedication ==
For Lorna McDonald
with love and thanks
for gifts of conversation, friendship, and example
over a lifetime

== Synopsis ==
Desmond Kale escapes from his detention at Botany Bay and heads into the bush to look after a flock of Merino sheep. Meanwhile the wardens at the prison seek his re-arrest.

== Critical reception ==
Luise Toma on "MC Reviews" noted:

McDonald tells his epic with opulence and a humour so understated you may find yourself laughing pages after you have read a joke because a regular brain is unable to process the author's quick wit at appropriate speed. Capturing the lingo of the times and circumstances, in a way that makes me wonder whether the man might have a time machine stowed away in his estate's stable, McDonald evokes a rich cast of foul-mouthed convicts and stiff officials, bumbling beaurocrats [sic] and long-suffering mothers, missionaries, indigenous folk, idiots and bush-philosophers. All of them come to life so easily and in such a convincing manner, the novel reads almost like a giant story board for something of the likes of Nick Cave's The Proposition.

== Awards ==
- Miles Franklin Award, winner 2006
- International IMPAC Dublin Literary Award, longlisted 2007
- Festival Awards for Literature (SA) Adelaide Festival Awards for Literature — Award for Fiction, winner 2008

== See also ==
- 2005 in Australian literature
