= The Golden Age (London novel) =

Book by Joan London

- First edition
- Author: Joan London
- Language: English
- Genre: Novel
- Publisher: Vintage Books, Australia
- Publication date: 2014
- Publication place: Australia
- Media type: Print (Paperback)
- Pages: 242
- ISBN: 9781741666441
- Preceded by: The Good Parents

The Golden Age (2014) is a novel by Australian author Joan London.

== Plot summary ==
Frank and Elsa meet at a rehabilitation clinic in suburban Perth in the early 1950s. Both have been stricken with polio, and Frank is a refugee from Hungary. The novel follows the relationship between Frank and Elsa across the years.

== Reviews ==
- The Monthly
- Sydney Review of Books

== Awards ==
Awards for The Golden Age
Year	Award	Result	Ref.
2015	ALS Gold Medal	Shortlist	
2015	Australian Book Industry Awards: Australian Literary Fiction Book of the Year	Shortlist	
2015	Miles Franklin Award	Shortlist	
2015	Nita B. Kibble Literary Award	Shortlist	
2015	Stella Prize	Shortlist	
