= Friendly Fire (poetry collection) =

2005 poetry collection by Jennifer Maiden

- Author: Jennifer Maiden
- Language: English
- Genre: Poetry collection
- Publisher: Giramondo Publishing
- Publication date: 2005
- Publication place: Australia
- Media type: Print
- Pages: 100 pp
- ISBN: 192088212X
- Preceded by: Mines
- Followed by: Pirate Rain

Friendly Fire is a poetry collection by Australian poet Jennifer Maiden, published by Giramondo Publishing, in 2005.

The first edition contains 35 poems, some of which had been published previously in various literary magazines, and one piece of prose.

== Dedication ==
- Dedication: "To Katharine Margot and to my late parents."

== Contents ==
Contents:

- "Noise"
- "Scotch Blue"
- "Old Europe Stared at Her Breakfast"
- "Missing Elvis and Two Naked Women at the Luddenham Show"
- "Missing Elvis: All-Ways Winds: Christmas, 2001"
- "The Death of England"
- "Cave"
- "Thunderbolt's Way"
- "Children's Workshop at Lewers Gallery"
- "'Guard With Your Life the Chinese Lady'"
- "Dracula on the Monaro"
- "Close as Velvet"
- "Foxfall 1"
- "Foxfall 2"
- "Foxfall 3"
- "Abdullah the Afghan Babe"
- "The Japanese Garden 1"
- "The Japanese Garden 2"
- "The Japanese Garden 3"
- "At Cabramurra"
- "Reflected Hearth at Bowen Mountain"
- "Costume Jewellery"
- "George Jeffreys: Introduction" (prose)
- "George Jeffreys Woke Up in Kabul"
- "George Jeffreys Woke Up in Kandahar"
- "George Jeffreys Woke Up in London"
- "George Jeffreys Woke Up in Berlin"
- "George Jeffreys Woke Up in the White House"
- "George Jeffreys Six : George Jeffreys Woke Up in Baghdad"
- "Together We Will a Cheese Achieve"
- "Intimate Geography ('Operation Iraqi Freedom')"
- "Download"
- "Day Release"
- "Channel Surf"
- "Slave Gold"
- "Lily"

== Critical reception ==
Reviewing the collection in the Australian Book Review Lisa Gorton noted: "Reading the poetry, you might doubt whether 'important' is the word Maiden would choose for what she has achieved. Her poems jump from large public events to small happenings: from George W. Bush to the sight of clouds in the Monaro. In this way, they suggest how what we habitually call important finds its place alongside the haphazard, provisional, small...There is something of John Donne in Maiden’s style of deliberate incongruity; her way of juxtaposing facts and ideas from customarily distinct realms of experience."

== Publication history ==
After the initial publication of the collection by Giramondo Publishing in 2005, it has not been reprinted.

== Awards ==
- The Age Book of the Year - Dinny O'Hearn Poetry Prize 2006, winner
- The Age Book of the Year - Book of the Year 2006, winner

== See also ==
- 2005 in Australian literature

== Notes ==
Literary editor of The Age, Jason Steger, interviewed Maiden about the poetry collection in 2006.
