= Recollections of a Bleeding Heart =

Memoir by Don Watson about the prime ministership of Paul Keating

Recollections of a Bleeding Heart: A Portrait of Paul Keating PM
- Author: Don Watson
- Language: English
- Genre: Biography
- Publisher: Random House Australia
- Publication date: May 1, 2002
- Media type: Hardcover
- Pages: 756 pp
- ISBN: 0091835178

Recollections of a Bleeding Heart: A Portrait of Paul Keating PM is a non-fiction political book, by Don Watson. It was first published by Random House Australia in 2002. It won The Age Book of the Year.

The book is the author's account of the prime ministership of Australia of Paul Keating, who served as the 24th prime minister of Australia from 1991 to 1996.

== Reviews ==
- "Review of Don Watson, Recollections of a Bleeding Heart: A Portrait of Paul Keating PM.", Australian Journal of Political Science, September 2002
- "Keating the Fascinator". Australian Book Review. June–July 2002. Archived from the original on 4 October 2011.
- Robert Manne (13 May 2002). "Keating, the 'fanatic heart' PM". The Age. Melbourne.

== Bibliography ==
- Recollections of a bleeding heart: a portrait of Paul Keating PM, Knopf, 2002, ISBN 978-0-09-183517-0; Random House Australia, 2008, ISBN 978-1-74166-827-8
