= Untold Lives & Later Poems =

2000 Australian poetry collection by Rosemary Dobson

- Author: Rosemary Dobson
- Language: English
- Genre: Poetry collection
- Publisher: Brandl and Schlesinger
- Publication date: 2000
- Publication place: Australia
- Media type: Print
- Pages: 73 pp
- Awards: 2001 The Age Book of the Year Book of the Year and Poetry Awards
- ISBN: 0330362895

Untold Lives & Later Poems is a collection of poems by Australian poet Rosemary Dobson, published by Brandl and Schlesinger in 2000.

The collection contains 47 poems from a variety of sources, with some being published here for the first time.

The book won both The Age Book of the Year Book of the Year and Poetry Awards in 2001.

== Contents ==
The poems in this collection are published in three sections:

1. Untold Lives, pp. 13-44
2. The News and Weather, pp. 45-68
3. Poems of a Marriage, pp. 69-73

- "The Major-General"
- "The Daughters of the Historian"
- "Sometime Academic"
- "Remembering Kitty"
- "Private Soldier"
- "The Widow"
- "Autobiographical"
- "Who?"
- "Growing Up"
- "Collects for the Days"
- "The Green Years"
- "The Sister in the Photograph"
- "The Apparition"
- "The 'Aunts'"
- "Elena"
- "The Young Companion"
- "Executive"
- "Photographer"
- "Her Story"
- "Memsahib's Memories"
- "The Householder"
- "Breakaway"
- "The Anthropologist"
- "The Pacifist"
- "Clergyman"
- "The News and Weather"
- "Down Here by the River"
- "The Artist, Lecturing"
- "A Thought from George Herbert"
- "A Thought from Isaak Walton"
- "Readings"
- "Cycladic Aquariums"
- "As It Happens"
- "A Letter From Another Country"
- "Innocence, Lost"
- Showgirls sequence
  - "Early Morning"
  - "Flowers in the Foyer"
- Four poems from Ambae
  - "The Women of Ambae"
  - "The Community of the Unborn"
  - "A Letter from Ambae"
  - "The Buyers of Language"
- "The Birdwatchers, Norfolk"
- "The House in Summer"
- "Empty Spaces"
- "Reading Aloud"
- "About Goodness"

== Critical reception ==
In his review of the collection for The Canberra Times Geoff Page noted that "book has all the qualities which readers have come to expect from Dobson since her first book, In a Convex Mirror (1944), but it has them even more intensely." He also noted that the poems show "a quiet wit, a leisurely pace and an unforced capacity for compassion."

== Awards ==
- 2001 The Age Book of the Year Awards Dinny O'Hearn Poetry Prize, winner
- 2001 The Age Book of the Year Book of the Year Award, winner
- 2001 Victorian Premier's Prize for Poetry, shortlisted

== Author's notes ==
In her preface to this collection Dobson noted that the poems in the section "Untold Lives" had been previously published in a volume with that title in 1992. She also noted that in the 1992 publication she had written:

The poems in this series are each intended to encapsulate a life, or to present a life at one of its dramatic moments...They are "untold" in the sense that they are mostly about unnamed people whom I have known and who are not likely to have been "told" before.

== Notes ==
- Dedication: For Alec Bolton, Printer 1926–1996

== See also ==
- 2000 in Australian literature
