= Fiona Kelly McGregor =

Australian writer and performance artist

- Born: Sydney, New South Wales
- Occupations: Novelist, essayist and art writer. Ex-performance artist
- Writing career
- Language: English
- Years active: 1992 – present
- Notable work: Indelible Ink (2010) ‘’ Iris ‘’ (2022)
- Notable awards: Steele Rudd Award (1995); The Age Book of the Year Award (2011); Woollahra Digital Literary Award (2019)

Fiona Kelly McGregor is an Australian writer, performance artist, and art critic whose third novel, Indelible Ink, won the 2011 The Age Book of the Year Award.

== Early life and education ==
McGregor was born in Sydney, New South Wales.

== Career ==
McGregor has written for a variety of publications including The Sydney Morning Herald, HEAT, Sydney Review of Books, Meanjin, The Times Literary Supplement, Art Monthly, The Monthly, The Saturday Paper and RealTime. In 2020 they began publishing under their full name, Fiona Kelly McGregor.

Following the publication of their first two books in 1993 and 1994, McGregor was named one of the inaugural Sydney Morning Herald Best Young Australian Novelists in 1997. Since then, McGregor has won and been shortlisted for multiple awards for short stories, novels and essays.

As a performance artist McGregor toured with You Have the Body, a meditation on unlawful detention, in 2008–09, and she screened her 4-hour video Vertigo at the MOP gallery in Sydney in February 2011. In November 2011, she presented a solo show at Artspace Visual Arts Centre, Sydney, entitled Water Series. McGregor's fourth book, Strange Museums, is a travel memoir about a performance art tour McGregor undertook through Poland in 2006.

== Awards and nominations ==
- 1992 winner — John Morrison VFAW short story prize — "Dirt"
- 1992 shortlisted The Australian/Vogel Literary Award (for an unpublished manuscript) — Au Pair
- 1995 winner Steele Rudd Award — Suck My Toes
- 1997 named one of the Best Young Australian Novelists by The Sydney Morning Herald
- 2003 shortlisted New South Wales Premier's Literary Awards — Christina Stead Prize for Fiction — Chemical Palace
- 2010 shortlisted Western Australian Premier's Book Awards — Fiction — Indelible Ink
- 2011 shortlisted Indie Awards — Fiction — Indelible Ink
- 2011 shortlisted Barbara Jefferis Award — Indelible Ink
- 2011 winner The Age Book of the Year Award — Book of the Year — Indelible Ink
- 2011 winner The Age Book of the Year Award — Fiction Prize — Indelible Ink
- 2019 winner Woollahra Digital Literary Award — non-fiction — The Hot Desk
- 2022 shortlisted Victorian Premier's Prize for Nonfiction — Buried Not Dead
- 2022 shortlisted Woollahra Digital Literary Award — non-fiction — Acts of Avoidance
- 2023 longlisted Stella Prize — novel — Iris
- 2023 longlisted ABDA Awards — novel — Iris
- 2023 longlisted BookPeople Award — novel — Iris
- 2023 shortlisted New South Wales Premier's Literary Awards — Christina Stead Prize for Fiction — Iris
- 2023 shortlisted ALS Gold Medal — Iris
- 2023 shortlisted Miles Franklin Award — Iris
- 2023 shortlisted ARA Historical Novel Award
- 2023 shortlisted Voss Literary Prize
- 2026 winner, Alex Buzo Shortlist Prize and shortlisted, Mark and Evette Moran Nib Award for Literature for The Trap

== Selected works ==
=== Novels ===
- Au Pair (1993)
- Chemical Palace (2002)
- Indelible Ink (2010)
- Iris (2022)
- The Trap (2026)

=== Short story collections ===
- Suck My Toes (1994)

=== Non-fiction ===
- Strange Museums: A Journey Through Poland (2008) (travel memoir, performance art critique)
- A Novel Idea (2019) (photoessay)
- Buried Not Dead (2021) (essay collection)
