= Water Man (novel) =

Book by Roger McDonald

- First edition
- Author: Roger McDonald
- Language: English
- Publisher: Picador, Australia
- Publication date: 1993
- Publication place: Australia
- Media type: Print (Paperback)
- Pages: 315
- ISBN: 0330273981
- Preceded by: Flynn
- Followed by: The Slap

Water Man is a 1993 novel by Australian novelist Roger McDonald.

== Plot summary ==
The "water man" of the book's title is a water diviner—or rather two water diviners: one working on an Australian station in 1939 and the other working the same property 50 years later. Events surrounding the first divining echo down the years to the second, when tensions left unresolved re-emerge and engulf a new set of characters.

== Notes ==
- Dedication: When bright things tarnish he will be truly gone. Then you will know him.

== Reviews ==
Reviewing the novel in The Canberra Times Alan Gould noted: "Perhaps the most persistent theme in McDonald's work is that of the personality unfamiliar with itself; able to scrutinise nature and fellow human beings with great, and often lyrical particularity, but never quite at ease with either, never quite self-possessed. With its gentle use of fable, with its unobtrusive underpinnings in Jungian psychology, Water Man provides an intriguing, readable, progress to that theme."

== Awards and nominations ==
- 1994 shortlisted Miles Franklin Literary Award
