= Benang: From the Heart =

1999 novel by Indigenous Australian author Kim Scott

Benang
- First edition cover
- Author: Kim Scott
- Language: English
- Genre: Novel
- Publisher: Fremantle Press, Australia
- Publication date: 1999
- Publication place: Australia
- Media type: Print (Paperback)
- Pages: 497 pp
- ISBN: 978-1-86368-240-4
- OCLC: 41877548
- Dewey Decimal: 823/.914 21
- LC Class: PR9619.3.S373 B46 1999
- Preceded by: True Country
- Followed by: Lost

Benang: From the Heart is a 1999 novel by Indigenous Australian author Kim Scott. It shared the 2000 Miles Franklin Award with Drylands by Thea Astley.

== Context of Novel ==
One of the main contexts in the novel deals with the process of "breeding out the colour". This was a process in which children were forcibly removed from their homes and assimilated into the white Australian society. These children were forced to "breed" with white Australians in order to lessen the appearance of the Aboriginal in them. It was believed that through this continuous process that eventually there would be no trace of Aboriginal in the future generations. Chief Protector of Aborigines in Western Australia, A. O. Neville, was a key player in this process and he believed that it would work. This process occurred due to the government's inability to classify mixed children for the government system, as well as their fear of what mixing would do for the society.

It was originally claimed that Australia was uninhabited. The Stolen Generations are the mixed (Australian Aboriginal and white Australian) children who were forcibly removed from their homes and families. According to the Stolen Generations website, "The notion that the absorption or assimilation of some Aboriginal people into the European population is a form of genocide had gone around academic and leftist political circles long before Wilson's enquiry but gained enormous impetus from it",

== Plot summary ==
Benang is about forced cultural assimilation, and finding how one can return to their own culture. The novel presents how difficult it is to form a working history of a population who had been historically uprooted from their past. Benang follows Harley, a young man who has gone through the process of "breeding out the colour", as he pieces together his family history through documentation, such as photograph and his grandfather's notes, as well as memories and experiences. Harley and his family have undergone a process of colonial scientific experimentation called "breeding of the colour" which separated individuals from their Indigenous Australian families and origins.

== Characters ==
- Ernest Soloman Scat - Harley's paternal grandfather and scientist. His Experiments include the focus of "breeding out the color" from mixed children to form "first white man".
- Harley Scat - The main character of the novel
- Auber Neville - Ernest's Cousin
- Kathleen Chatalong - Jack's sister
- Harriette Coolman - Harley's maternal great-grandmother
- Daniel Coolman - Twin #1 who is Harley's maternal great-grandfather and cousin to the

Chatalongs (Irishman)

- Will Coolman - Daniel's son
- Patrick Coolman - Twin #2
- Jack Chatalong - Kathleen's Brother
- Constable (Sergeant) Hall - Father figure to Kathleen
- Sandy One Mason - White great-great-grandfather
- Fanny - Nyoogar great-great-grandmother

== Passages, Quotes and Themes ==
- As reluctant as I am to face it, I may be the successful end of a long line of failures. Or is it the other way round?

So... So, by way of introduction, here I come:
The first white man born. (Page 10/12)

- And it was in the subsequent search for the biological family of one of my girlfriends that so much trouble began, and led me to reconsider who I am.

Raised to carry on one heritage, and ignore another, I find myself wishing to reverse that upbringing, not only for the sake of my children, but also for my ancestors, and for their children in turn. And therefore, inevitably, most especially, for myself. (Page 19/21)

- Various people, all classifiable as Aboriginal. There were portraits arranged in pairs; one a snapshot labeled As I found them, the other a studio photograph captioned Identical with above child. There were families grouped according to skin colour. And, sudden enough to startle me, my own image. (Page 25-26/27-28)
- Captions to the photographs; full-blood, half-caste (first cross), quadroon, octoroon. There was a page of various fractions, possible permutations growing more and more convoluted. Of course, in the language of such mathematics it is simple; from the whole to the partial and back again. This much was clear; I was a fraction of what I might have been.
- Breeding Up. In the third or fourth generation no sign of native origin is apparent. The repetition of the boarding school process and careful breeding ... after two or three generations the advance should be so great that families should be living like the rest of the community. (Page 26/28)
- There were a couple of family trees inscribed on the flyleaf. Trees? Father, they were sharply roll diagrams. My name is finished eat one. On another page there was a third, fourth. All leading to me. ? Routed in the margins of those diagrams, and I was sowing my own. Books everywhere, with strips of paper protruding from them like dry and shriveled tongues. The need for both biological and social absorption. Dilute the strain.
- 'Well, old man, f*** me white.' (Page 27/29)
- I understood that much effort had gone into arriving at me. At someone like me. I was intended as a product of a long and considered process which my grandfather had brought to a conclusion. (Page 28/30)
- It appeared that in the little family history my grandfather had bequeathed options had disappeared. It seems an inexorable process, this one of we becoming I. (Page 31/33)
- Whatever the confusions of my genealogy, there seems little doubt my grandfather intended to be my creator. (Page 32/34)
- Perhaps, perhaps it is not so much a question of the colour of the skin as the colour of the mind... (Page 48/50)
- Following branches of my family tree, I discovered a series of white men who—because they married Nyoongar woman and claimed their children—were exceptional. But their children grew in a climate of denial and shame that made it difficult for even a strong spirit to express itself. And there were other children those same fathers did not claim.
- Searching the archives I have come across photographs of ancestors which have been withdrawn from collections, presumably because evidence of a too-dark baby has embarrassed some descendant or other. (Page 97/99)
- Benang? Consider the spelling of hard-of-hearing and ignorant scribes: Benang, Pinyan; Winnery, Wyonin. The same people. We are of the same people. (Page 103/105)
- The birth of even an unsuccessfully first-white-man-born-in-family-line has required a lot of death, a lot of space, a lot of emptiness. All of which I have had in abundance.

Sandy One was no white man. Just as I am no white man, despite the look of me...(Page 494/496)

- Yes, I am something of a curiosity—even for my own people.
- I offer these words, especially, to those of you I embarrass, and who turn away from the shame of seeing me; or perhaps it is because your eyes smart as the wind blows the smoke a little toward you, and you hear something like a million million many-sized hearts beating, and whispering of the waves, leaves, grasses... We are still here, Benang. (Page 495/497)

== Reviews ==
Reviewing the novel for The Hindu, K. Kunhikrishnan wrote:

"For writing his second novel Benang Kim Scott conducted research for five years, tracing his family history through welfare files and from a diversity of sources. He confirmed that the novel was "inspired by research into his family and my growing awareness of the context of that family history". The novel is hence an imaginative blend of fact and fiction and archival documentation to explore in historical and emotional terms the shameful history of the White treatment of Australian aboriginal people without didacticism and bitterness or moral propaganda. It makes compelling reading, as it is a moving depiction of cultural oppression and the resilience of the Nyoongar people from the time of first contact with the White colonial power."

Reading Benang, one could see that the narration could be seen as unreliable. Narration and writing style used are similar to that of stream of consciousness, factual information, history and memories. All of these help compose the complex and sometimes confusing narration of Benang. Writing styles can be compared to the novel Beloved by Toni Morrison, in the way the narrator speaks through his memories or stream of memories and facts. It is difficult to find what the narrator is going for but upon further reading all the memories, thoughts and emotions presenting in this novel finally come together.

== Awards ==
- The Kate Challis RAKA Award, Creative Prose, 2001: winner
- Miles Franklin Literary Award, 2000: joint winner
- Western Australian Premier's Book Awards, Fiction Award, 1999: winner

== See also ==
- 2000 in Australian literature
- Cultural genocide
- Declaration on the Rights of Indigenous Peoples
- Genocide
- History of Australia
- History wars
- Moseley Royal Commission
- Our Generation (film)
- Stolen Generations
- White Australia policy
- White Stolen Generations
