= 1915 (miniseries) =

1982 television miniseries by Peter Yeldham

- Based on: 1915: A Novel of Gallipoli by Roger McDonald
- Written by: Peter Yeldham
- Directed by: Chris Thomson; Di Drew
- Starring: Scott McGregor; Scott Burgess; Sigrid Thornton; Jackie Woodburne; Ilona Rodgers; Richard Moir; Serge Lazareff; Damon Sanders; Andrew McFarlane
- Composer: Bruce Smeaton
- Country of origin: Australia
- Original language: English
- No. of episodes: 7

Production
- Executive producer: Geoffrey Daniels
- Producer: Ray Alchin
- Cinematography: Peter Hendry
- Editors: Neil Thumpston; Tony Kavanagh; Lynn Solly
- Running time: 50 minutes

Original release
- Network: ABC TV
- Release: 27 June – 8 August 1982

1915 is an Australian historical drama television miniseries written by Peter Yeldham, based on Roger McDonald's 1979 novel 1915: A Novel of Gallipoli, that premiered on ABC TV on 27 June 1982, and concluded on 8 August 1982.

== Plot ==
1915 details the friendship between two young friends during the outbreak of World War I, as they are sent to fight for their country in the trenches of Gallipoli in 1915.

== Cast ==
- Scott Burgess as Billy Mackenzie
- Scott McGregor as Walter Gilchrist
- Lorraine Bayly as Helen Gilchrist
- Gary Holmes as Douggie Gilchrist
- Bill Hunter as Alan Gilchrist
- Jackie Woodburne as Dianna Bendetto
- Arna-Maria Winchester as Brigid Scott
- Sigrid Thornton as Frances Reilly
- Anne Haddy as Mrs. Gillen
- Andrew McFarlane as Robert Gillen
- Gerard Kennedy as Dent
- Serge Lazareff as Blackly Reid
- Richard Moir as Reverend Fox
- Maurie Fields as Mayor
- Ilona Rodgers as Mrs. Reilly
- Martin Vaughan as Hugh Mackenzie
- Vince Martin as Frank Barton
- Adrian Wright as Oliver Melrose
- Ric Herbert as Pig Nolan
- Mervyn Drake as Lt. Fagan
- Alan David Lee as Corporal
- Ned Manning as Captain Ashworth
- Noel Hodda as Captain Barnes

== Reception ==
John Voorhees of the Seattle Times wries "But while the characters are compelling enough to hold our interest through all seven episodes, the real reason for watching 1915 is because it captures the feeling of time and place so expertly, exhibiting a sense of history that goes beyond old cars and period clothes. And it is that historical ambience that sets 1915 apart from many TV miniseries." Daniel Ruth of the Chicago Sun-Times gave it 2 1/2 stars, criticising the pacing: "This mini-series takes too long to establish itself, as McGregor and Burgess spend the first four hours of "1915" swooning over Thornton and Woodburne and calling each other "mate". Enough already.", but praising other aspects: "Two virtues of "1915" are its terrific production values and period costuming."

== Awards and nominations ==
Year	Association	Category	Recipient/nominee	Result	Ref.
1983	Logie Awards	Best Single Drama or Miniseries	1915	Won	
1983	Logie Awards	Best Support Actor in a Single Drama or Miniseries	Adrian Wright	Won	
1983	Logie Awards	Best Lead Actor in a Single Drama or Miniseries	Scott McGregor	Nominated	
1983	Logie Awards	Best Lead Actress in a Single Drama or Miniseries	Sigrid Thornton	Nominated	
1983	Logie Awards	Best Support Actress in a Single Drama or Miniseries	Jackie Woodburne	Nominated	
