= The Glade Within the Grove =

1996 novel by David Foster

The Glade within the Grove
- Author: David Foster
- Language: English
- Genre: Novel
- Publisher: Fourth Estate, U.K.
- Publication date: 1996
- Publication place: Australia
- Media type: Print Hardback & Paperback
- Pages: 431
- ISBN: 1-85702-452-4
- OCLC: 60307757
- Dewey Decimal: 823/.914 21
- LC Class: PR9619.3.F6 I5 1999
- Preceded by: Mates of Mars
- Followed by: In the New Country

The Glade within the Grove is a 1996 novel by Australian author David Foster.

It won the 1997 Miles Franklin Award.

== Synopsis ==
Retired postman D’Arcy D’Oliveres, of Dog Rock finds an undelivered package at the bottom of an old mail bag. In the package is the manuscript of an epic poem called the Ballad of Erinungarah written by a young man named Timothy Papadirnitriou.

== Critical reception ==
Geoffrey Dutton in The Australian Book Review stated: "The Glade Within the Grove asks the deepest questions, of love and life and where the gods have gone. It is a novel of great importance, by any standards...[it] is the work of a master craftsman with a prodigious imagination."

== Awards ==
Awards for The Glade Within the Grove
Year	Award	Result	Ref.
1998	International Dublin Literary Award	Shortlist	
1997	Miles Franklin Literary Award	Winner	
1996	James Joyce Foundation Suspended Sentence Award	Winner	
1996	The Age Book of the Year Award for Fiction	Shortlist	
1996	NBC Banjo Award for Fiction	Shortlist	

== Publication history ==
After the novel's initial publication in 1996 by Random House in Australia and Fourth Estate in the UK, it was republished by Vintage in Australia in 1997.

== See also ==
- 1996 in Australian literature
- Middlemiss.org
