= When Colts Ran =

2010 novel by Roger McDonald

- First edition
- Author: Roger McDonald
- Language: English
- Publisher: Vintage, Australia
- Publication date: 2010
- Publication place: Australia
- Media type: Print (Paperback)
- Pages: 346
- ISBN: 9781864710410
- Preceded by: The Ballad of Desmond Kale
- Followed by: The Following

When Colts Ran is a 2010 novel by Australian novelist Roger McDonald.

== Plot summary ==
The "Colts" of the title is the principal character, Kingsley Colts, an orphan being raised by World War I veteran Dunc Buckler and his wife Veronica. The novel follows the arc of Colts's life, from station hand to World War II in New Guinea to livestock agent, broken, forlorn and alcoholic.

== Notes ==
Epigraph:

Peaseblossom.........Ready.
Cobweb.......................... And I.
Moth ......................................And I
Mustardseed....................................And I.
All..........................................................Where shall we go?

- A Midsummer Night's Dream, Act III, Scene I

== Reviews ==
Reviewing the novel for The Sydney Morning Herald James Ley noted that the author has brought "polish to a cliched genre." He went on to explain that "for McDonald the challenge in tackling subjects that evoke certain nationalistic stereotypes is to render them with the kind of complexity and literary sophistication they are often denied".

Lisa Hill, on her ANZ LitLovers LitBlog, concluded of the novel: "This is a fine book that has important things to say about gender identity in Australia, not just in the bush but in society in general. It debunks myth-making about rural life with a sobering picture of a sense of disarray. It reminds Australians that we need to re-evaluate and support rural life for it to thrive…"

== Awards and nominations ==
- 2011 shortlisted Indie Awards — Fiction
- 2011 shortlisted Miles Franklin Literary Award
- 2011 shortlisted Prime Minister's Literary Awards — Fiction
- 2011 shortlisted Victorian Premier's Literary Awards — The Vance Palmer Prize for Fiction
- 2012 longlisted International Dublin Literary Award
