= Sister Ships and Other Stories =

Short story collection by Joan London

- Author: Joan London
- Language: English
- Genre: Fiction
- Publisher: Fremantle Press
- Publication date: 1986
- Publication place: Australia
- Media type: Print
- Pages: 118 pp
- ISBN: 0949206113
- Preceded by: -
- Followed by: Letter to Constantine

Sister Ships and Other Stories (1986) is a collection of short stories by Australian writer Joan London. It was published by Fremantle Press in 1986. It was the author's first short story collection.

The collection includes 8 original stories by the author.

== Contents ==
- "Sister Ships"
- "First Night"
- "New Year"
- "The Girls Love Each Other"
- "Enough Rope"
- "Travelling"
- "Lilies"
- "Burning Off"

== Dedication ==
- "To Beau and George"

== Critical reception ==
Writing in The Australian Book Review critic Anne Diamond noted: "Fiction which is well-choreographed is difficult to resist. Joan London’s first collection of short stories, Sister Ships, is a dancerly go at mimesis; poised, unerring, it keeps its promises. And to run the tautological line between ‘literature’ and life, as all writing must, reminds us of the possibility for faux pas as well as the pas de deux; in one instance, an amnesia as to what has already been said, and in the other, stories which are so gracefully designed that they can say the same thing twice, or more, and we remember and witness such repetitions with pleasure...London's stories are guarded by nostalgia and nabbed by 1980's feminism. Despite an exciting plurality, this current ethos is essentially marked by a vigorous retrospection; Farmer, Garner, Burke, for example; it validates the long look back."

A reviewer for Publishers Weekly stated that the "stories show a dazzling range of locations and situations, from sexual tension between two young couples sharing a house in the author's native Australia to several aimless hippie wanderers in '60s-era Laos. This is some of the best new fiction from Australia."

== Publication history ==
After the collection's original publication by Fremantle Press in 1986, it was reprinted by Penguin in the US in 1988.

== Awards ==
The collection won The Age Book of the Year Award for Fiction (or Imaginative Writing) in 1986

== See also ==
- 1986 in Australian literature
