= Don Watson =

Australian author and public speaker

- Born: 1949 (age 76–77); Korumburra, Victoria, Australia
- Occupations: Author, screenwriter, speech writer
- Writing career
- Notable awards: 2002 The Age Book of the Year Award, winner; 2003 National Biography Award, joint winner; 2008 The Age Book of the Year, winner; 2015 New South Wales Premier's Literary Awards — Douglas Stewart Prize for Non-Fiction, winner

Don Watson (born 1949) is an Australian author, screenwriter, former political adviser, and speechwriter.

== Early life ==
Watson was born in 1949 at Warragul in the Gippsland region of Victoria, and grew up on a farm in nearby Korumburra.

== Academia and early career ==
Watson studied for his undergraduate degree at La Trobe University and latterly completed PhD at Monash University before spending ten years working as an academic historian. He wrote three books on Australian history before turning his hand to TV and the stage. For several years he combined writing political satire for the actor Max Gillies with political speeches for the then Premier of Victoria, John Cain. In 1992, he became Prime Minister of Australia Paul Keating's speech-writer and adviser.

== Screenwriting ==
In addition to regular books, articles and essays, in recent years he has also written feature films, including The Man Who Sued God, starring Billy Connolly and Judy Davis, and Passion, a film about Percy Grainger starring Richard Roxburgh.

== Prizes and recognition ==
Watson's historical work in exposing the role of pioneer pastoralist Angus McMillan as a leader of several massacres of Gunai Kurnai people in Gippsland, Victoria, has often been quoted in articles about the man and the massacres.

In 2014 The Bush: Travels in the Heart of Australia was published to critical acclaim for its content and for the beauty and effectiveness of Watson's writing. It won Book of the Year in the New South Wales Premier's Literary Awards in 2015.

American Journeys was awarded both The Age Book of the Year non-fiction and Book of the Year awards in 2008. It also won the 2008 Walkley Book Award.

Death Sentence, his book about the decay of public language, won the Australian Booksellers Association Book of the Year in 2008.

Recollections of a Bleeding Heart: A Portrait of Paul Keating PM published in 2002 was awarded both The Age Book of the Year and non-fiction Prizes, the Courier-Mail Book of the Year, the National Biography Award and the Australian Literary Studies Association's Book of the Year.

Watson's 2001 Quarterly Essay Rabbit Syndrome: Australia and America won the inaugural Alfred Deakin Prize in the Victorian Premier's Literary Awards.

Watson, together with Rachel Perkins, Jacob Hickey and Darren Dale, won the 2023 Digital History Prize, New South Wales Premier's History Awards for The Australian Wars, Episode 1.

== Redfern Park Speech ==
In Recollections of a Bleeding Heart, Watson described his writing of the Redfern Park Speech in 1992, which, he claims, by way of praising Keating for his courage, the Prime Minister delivered without changing a single word. Keating has disputed Watson's authorship, saying the speech developed out of dozens of conversations between them.

== Personal life ==
Watson is divorced from the publisher Hilary McPhee. He has an adult daughter from an earlier marriage, and two young children with the writer Chloe Hooper.

== Bibliography ==
- —— (1978). Brian Fitzpatrick: A Radical Life. Hale & Iremonger. ISBN 0908094175.
- —— (1984). Caledonia Australis. William Collins. ISBN 0002173220.
- —— (1984). Story of Australia. McPhee Gribble.
- —— (2002). Recollections of a Bleeding Heart: A Portrait of Paul Keating PM. Random House Australia. ISBN 9781741668278.
- —— (2003). Death Sentence: The Decay of Public Language. ISBN 9781740512787.
- —— (2004). Watson's Dictionary of Weasel Words: Contemporary Cliches, Cant and Management Jargon. Random House Australia. ISBN 9781740513661.
- —— (2008). American Journeys. Vintage Books. ISBN 9781741666212.
- —— (2008). On Indignation. Melbourne University Press. ISBN 9780522855357.
- —— (2009). Bendable Learnings. The Wisdom of Modern Management. Knopf. ISBN 9781741669046.
- —— (2015). Worst Words: A Compendium of Contemporary Cant, Gibberish and Jargon. Vintage Australia. ISBN 9780857983442.
- —— (2014). The Bush: Travels in the Heart of Australia. Hamish Hamilton an imprint of Penguin Books. ISBN 9781926428215.
- —— (2016). A Single Tree. Penguin Australia. ISBN 9781926428819.
- —— (2018). There It Is Again: Collected Writings. Vintage.
- —— (2022). The Passion of Private White. Scribner.
- —— (18 November 2025). The Shortest History of the United States of America. Black Inc. ISBN 9781760643942.
