= The Company: The Story of a Murderer =

2000 novel by Australian writer Ararbella Edge

- Author: Arabella Edge
- Language: English
- Genre: Fiction
- Publisher: Picador
- Publication date: 2000
- Publication place: Australia
- Media type: Print
- Pages: 371 pp.
- Awards: Commonwealth Writers' Prize — South East Asia and South Pacific Region — Best First Book Award winner 2001
- ISBN: 0330362208
- Preceded by: -
- Followed by: The God of Spring

The Company: The Story of a Murderer (2000) is the debut novel by Australian writer Arabella Edge. It was originally published by Picador in Australia in 2000.

== Synopsis ==
The novel is based on the 1629 voyage of the Batavia, a flagship of the Dutch East India Company. One of the passengers on board, Jeronimus Cornelisz, incites a mutiny and the ship is wrecked on a chain of small islands off the western coast of Australia.

== Publishing history ==
After its initial publication in Australia by Picador in 2000, the novel was reprinted by Picador in 2001 and then published as follows:

- Simon & Schuster, Australia, 2001 and again in 2003
- Picador, UK, 2002
- Picador, USA, 2003

The novel was also translated into Dutch in 2001, German in 2003, French in 2005, and Serbia in 2008.

== Critical reception ==
Writing for the Historical Novel Society John R. Vallely noted: "This is a dark and chilling view of the inner workings of a psychotic mind...Based on a true story, The Company is most assuredly not for the faint of heart. Those who can digest Cornelisz will be struck by Arabella Edge’s undoubted capabilities as a master of nuance and descriptive powers. It is a good, even compelling, story. One just has to be able to see the world through Cornelisz’s eyes to be able to enjoy it."

== Awards ==
- Commonwealth Writers' Prize — South East Asia and South Pacific Region — Best First Book Award winner 2001
- Miles Franklin Award shortlisted 2001

== See also ==
- 2000 in Australian literature
