= Indelible Ink =

2010 novel by Fiona Kelly McGregor

- Author: Fiona Kelly McGregor
- Language: English
- Genre: novel
- Publisher: Scribe Publishing, Australia
- Publication date: 2010
- Publication place: Australia
- Media type: Print Paperback
- Pages: 452
- ISBN: 9781921215964

Indelible Ink (2010) is a novel by Australian author Fiona Kelly McGregor. It won the Fiction Prize and Book of the Year Award at The Age Book of the Year awards in 2011.

== Plot summary ==
Marie King is a middle-aged Sydney divorcee. Prone to drinking and estranged from her scheming children she slowly develops a liking for tattoos and a particular tattoo artist.

== Reviews ==
Geordie Williamson in The Monthly found the novel to be evocative of its setting: "Beyond the domestic drama of Indelible Ink – its tough, yet tender, appreciation of family dynamics, its revelation of character as an endless war of contradictory impulses fought within a single, human frame – McGregor has set out to exhaustively catalogue Sydney in all its guises. It is an enterprise anthropological in reach, drawing on everything from history and the built environment to gay subculture and the economics of real estate. Even the melt and drift at its close feels like a nod to the city’s endless droning summers."

== Awards and nominations ==
- 2010 shortlisted Western Australian Premier's Book Awards – Fiction
- 2011 shortlisted Indie Awards – Fiction
- 2011 shortlisted Barbara Jefferis Award
- 2011 winner The Age Book of the Year Award – Fiction Prize
- 2011 winner The Age Book of the Year Award – Book of the Year
