= The Pure Land =

1974 novel by David Foster

- First edition cover
- Author: David Foster
- Language: English
- Genre: Novel
- Publisher: Macmillan
- Publication date: 1974
- Publication place: Australia
- Media type: Print
- Pages: 235 pp.
- Awards: 1974 Age Book of the Year, winner
- ISBN: 0333139909

The Pure Land is the 1974 debut novel written by David Foster.

It was the winner of the first The Age Book of the Year award.

== Synopsis ==
The novel is divided into four parts. Part One is set in 1930s Katoomba, New South Wales where the middle-aged landscape photographer Albert Manwaring travels to America with his daughter. Part Two, during the 1960s, focuses on Manwaring's daughter, Jean (or Janet) living in America and discusses originality of art, especially Australian, European and American art. In Part Three, in 1970, Janet's son, Danny, becomes a scientist and intellectual, Albert Manwaring's antithesis. In Part Four Danny intends to move to Australia, where his family is originally from, and ends up in Katoomba.

== Publication history ==
Following the novel's initial publication by Macmillan in 1974, it was reprinted as follows:

- Penguin Books, Australia, 1985
- Vintage Books, Australia, 1996

== Notes ==
- Shaw, Narelle. "The Pure Land". The Literary Encyclopedia. 27 July 2004. Accessed 5 July 2008.
- The Journal of Commonwealth Literature, Vol. 26, No. 2, 13-43 (1991)
- Lever, Susan. (2 Feb 2006) "Ratbag Writers and Cranky Critics: In Their Praise" Journal of the Association for the Study of Australian Literature Online. Accessed 5 July 2008.
