= Russ the Story Bus =

Mobile library

Russ the Story Bus is a mobile library that visits primary schools in New South Wales outside of central and eastern Sydney with guest authors and illustrators. It is managed by the Sydney Writer's Festival.

== Tours ==
Russ began as a way for Australian children's authors and illustrators to give talks at schools they might not typically visit. These areas include primary schools in Western Sydney (such as Bankstown, Blacktown, Cabramatta, Liverpool, Parramatta, and Penrith), regional New South Wales, and the Australian Capital Territory.

During visits, children can pick a book to take home for free and are encouraged to swap a preloved book for a new one. Russ has headphones for children to listen to audiobooks.

Guest speakers on Russ have included Jeff Kinney, Andy Griffiths James Roy, Richard Roxburgh, Jules Faber and Damon Young, Tony Wilson, Kate Forsyth, and Katrina Nannestad.

== Design ==
Russ was originally a school bus, and was remodelled into a mobile library in 2014.

In 2016, Russ featured art on its outside by author and artist Shaun Tan. As of 2024, the exterior outwork features art by Cheryl Orsini. The interior of the bus was designed by the Laboratory for Visionary Architecture (LAVA) and built by Mark Swartz using 580 pieces of curved plywood. It was shortlisted for a 2017 NSW Architecture Awards in the Small Project category.

Russ is over 35 years old and has experienced wear over time, meaning that the physical bus will need to be replaced by 2026.
