= David Foster (novelist) =

Australian novelist

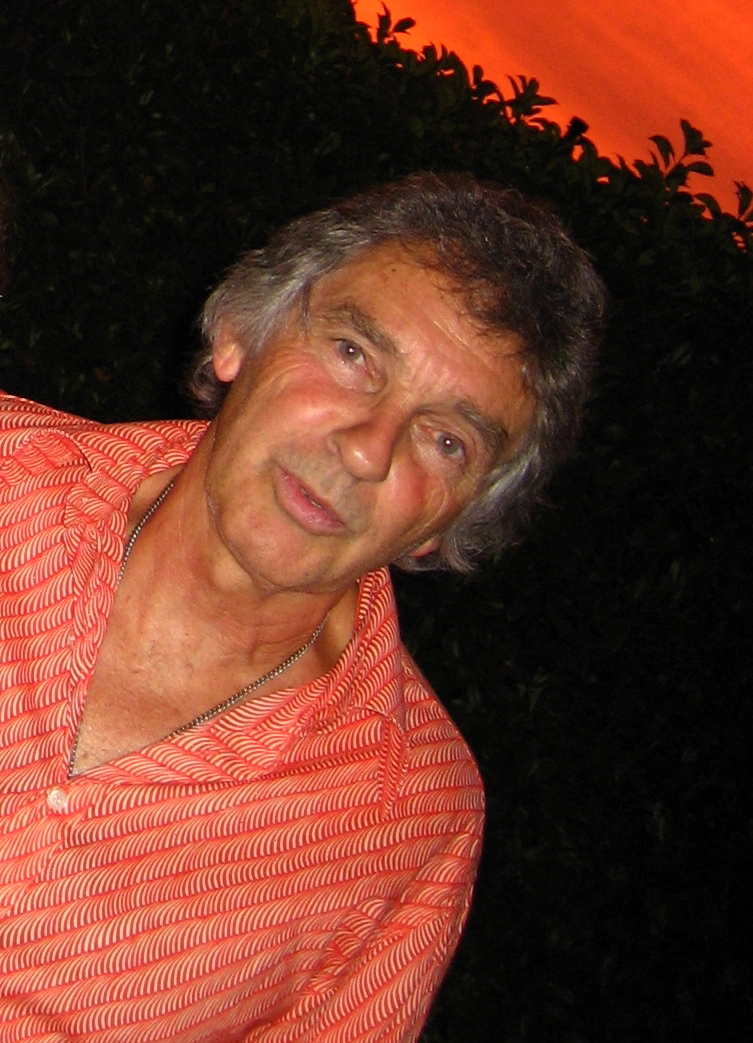
- A photograph of David Foster by daughter Zöe Foster.
- Born: David Manning Foster; 1944 (age 81–82); Blue Mountains, New South Wales, Australia
- Education: University of Sydney
- Occupations: Novelist, scientist
- Spouses: Robin Bowers (m. 1964; div. 1974) Gerda Busch (m. 1974)
- Children: 6

David Manning Foster (born 1944) is an Australian novelist and scientist. He has written a range of satires on the theme of the decline of Western civilization and produced short stories, poetry, essays, and several radio plays.

== Early life and education ==
David Manning Foster was born in the Blue Mountains in New South Wales, Australia, to George and Hazel (née Manning) Foster, vaudeville and radio performers who had separated before his birth. He spent his early years in Katoomba, raised by his mother and maternal grandparents.

In 1950, Foster spent six months in Katoomba Hospital recovering from poliomyelitis, a disease that left him with a slight limp. His mother married a bank officer, and Foster attended high schools in Sydney (Fort Street High School), Armidale (Armidale High School), and Orange (Orange High School) as the family moved from city to country towns. At Orange High, Foster began playing drums professionally in a jazz dance band.

In 1961, Foster commenced Bachelor of Arts at the University of Sydney in Sydney, but he left studies after a year to work and travel. A year later, in 1963, he returned to the university to study chemistry at the University of Sydney School of Chemistry.

Foster worked part-time as a musician and as an engineer at Marrickville Council while he completed his Bachelor of Science in Chemistry. He was awarded the University Medal for Inorganic Chemistry in 1967 and moved to Canberra for a PhD in Biological Inorganic Chemistry at the Australian National University, from which he graduated in 1970.

== Career ==
=== Scientific and early literary career ===
At the end of this degree, he went to Philadelphia, Pennsylvania, in the United States, to pursue postdoctoral studies at the Institute for Cancer Research at the University of Pennsylvania.

He began to write his first novellas, later published in North South West (1973). Back in Sydney in 1972, he worked as a research officer in the Department of Medicine at the University of Sydney before abandoning science for a career as a novelist. Since then, he has supported himself and his family through various jobs as a pool attendant, musician, postman, truck driver, martial arts instructor, and trawler fisherman. After the publication of North, South, West by Macmillan, Foster was awarded an Australia Council for the Arts Fellowship.

=== Literary career ===
Foster's first collection of novellas was well-received, and his first novel, The Pure Land (1974), won the inaugural The Age Book of the Year prize. The story is intensely autobiographical, as it traces the experiences of the young scientist Danny Harris in America and Australia. At the novel's end, Danny has abandoned science and appears to be inventing the novel in which he is a character. His grandfather, Albert Manwaring, has left his life as a photographer in Katoomba to seek success and, finally, spiritual purity in America; Danny, born in America, reverses the journey to find a pure land in Australia. The novel depicts the materialism of America and the colonial history of Australia. Another collection of stories followed this novel, Escape to Reality (1977), which pursued Foster's interest in male irresponsibility and the paradoxes of science and art. With a fellow scientist at the Australian National University, called 'D.K. Lyall' (Des Kirk), Foster published The Empathy Experiment (1977), a strange exploration of paranoia in the context of scientific experiments in empathy.

A 1978 Marten Bequest Travelling Scholarship enabled Foster to travel to Scotland to research Moonlite (1981), his acclaimed satire on colonialism, which places the experiences of Scottish islanders during the clearances of the nineteenth century in paradoxical comparison with the colonising of Australia at the same time. Plumbum (1983) uses Foster's experience in jazz bands to satirise the contemporary Western adulation of rock musicians, contrasting this enthusiasm with the various religions of Bangkok and India. The Adventures of Christian Rosy Cross (1985) is a burlesque historical satire on the paradoxes of religious belief, following the picaresque adventures of Christians as they search for the philosopher's stone. Dog Rock: A Postal Pastoral (1985) offers a more benign comedy as Foster examines the trivia of an Australian country town like Bundanoon. A second Dog Rock novel, The Pale Blue Crochet Coathanger Cover (1988), continues this nostalgic view of a disappearing rural life with particular reference to the misuse of animals. In 2012, Foster published a third Dog Rock novel, Man of Letters. Testosterone (1987), inspired by a residence in Venice in 1984, uses the convention of the separated twins to satirise the cultural differences between Britain and Australia, with a third possibility represented by Italy. Among its many allusions and parodies, the novel invokes the traditions of Carnival and Carlo Goldoni's play, The Venetian Twins.

After the Australian Bicentennial celebrations of 1988, Foster published his satire of the state of contemporary Australia in Mates of Mars (1991). The novel follows martial arts enthusiasts travelling from Sydney to the Northern Territory and encountering spiritualism that challenges their beliefs and attitudes. The characters represent a multicultural Australia and demonstrate the novel's premise that 'Australians are not just members of the internal proletariat of...Western Christian Civilisation (a civilisation now decrepit that can never take Colonials seriously) but also, in certain key aspects, chiefly, but not exclusively, economic barbarian members of the external proletariat of the Sinic Mahayana Buddhist Civilisation, in its Westernised Japanese, Korean, and Colonial Chinese branch, on the southernmost march of that civilisation.

Foster used the support of an Australian government Creative Fellowship awarded in 1991 (a 'Keating' award) to research his monumental The Glade Within the Grove (1996). Narrated by the postman of Dog Rock, D’Arcy D’Oliveres, this novel examines the destruction of the native forests of Australia and the decline of Christianity in the context of pre-Christian religious beliefs. Set mainly in the 'revolutionary' year of 1968, the novel speculates about a group of hippies who set up a commune in the south-eastern forests of Australia. The novel's accompanying poem,The Ballad of Erinungerah, claims to be the work of a child of the commune and describes the visit of the goddess Brigid and her demand that the men castrate themselves. The novel celebrates the forests in lyrical descriptions, satirises the stupidity of the communards, and translates snatches of classic texts into Australian vernacular. It is celebratory, satirical, and elegiac. Later, Foster published under his own name an essay, 'On Castration, in Heat magazine that incorporated part of the novel and argued that male sexuality is a destructive force that needs to be controlled. This obsession is evident in all of Foster's work after Mates of Mars. His novel In the New Country offers a comic and despairing view of the decline of rural life in Australia, comparing it to the corresponding decline of spirituality in the Old Country of Ireland. The Land Where Stories End is a fairytale about a woodcutter in Ireland who goes on an impossible quest for spiritual purity.

In 2009, Foster published Sons of the Rumour, his most ambitious and original novel. Modelled on the One Thousand and One Nights structure, it changes the storyteller's role from Shahrazad to a group of men travelling through the 7th-century city of Merv. Richard Burton's Arabian Nights are transformed into Iranian days. Foster creates a comic structure for the stories with his rather Australian bickering couple, the Shah and Shahrazad. Still, the stories are imaginative adventures, sometimes puzzling, sometimes grotesque, and often wondrous. For example, 'The Mine in the Moon' imagines a world without women, where boys grow up without maternal comfort; 'The Tears of the Fish' describes an orgy and castration ritual; and 'The Gilt Felt Yurt' measures the loss of freedom in the creation of civilisation and settlement. In the stories, the Shah undergoes an education in spiritualism and sexual understanding. A final section of the novel moves to the present day, where a modern man undergoes a visionary experience in Ireland. Reviewing the novel for the Australian Book Review, James Ley concluded, 'There is simply no one remotely like him in contemporary Australian fiction. He is so far ahead of everyone else that it is not funny. Except that it is funny, very very funny. Citing The Contemptuary as one of his 2019 Books of the Year, Geordie Williamson described Foster as 'one of our most unheralded major writers'

== Personal life ==
In 1964, Foster married his Orange High School girlfriend, Robin Bowers, with whom he had three children: Samantha (b. 1968), Natalie (b. 1969), and Seth (b. 1973).

In 1974, he left his wife and family to live with Gerda Busch, the singer in the Canberra jazz band where he played drums. They moved to the country town of Bundanoon, where they married and had three children: Antigone (b. 1975), Levi (b. 1976), and Zoe Foster Blake (b. 1980). Foster worked as a postman at Bundanoon for many years, and his Dog Rock novels provide a comic version of the town.

== Awards ==
- 1974: The Age Book of the Year Book of the Year and Imaginative Writing Award for The Pure Land
- 1975: Barbara Ramsden Award for The Pure Land
- 1978 Marten Bequest For Prose
- 1981: National Book Council Book of the Year for Moonlite
- 1991: Australian Government Creative Fellowship (Keating)
- 1996 James Joyce Suspended Sentence Fellowship, UC Dublin
- 1997: Miles Franklin Award for The Glade Within the Grove
- 1999: Courier-Mail Book of the Year for In the New Country
- 1999: joint winner (with Bruce Pascoe) of the FAW Australian Literature Award for In the New Country
- 2008 Harold White Fellowship NLA
- 2010: Patrick White Award

== Selected works ==
Novels

- The Pure Land (Macmillan, 1974)
- The Empathy Experiment co-authored with D.K. Lyall (Wild & Woolley, 1977)
- Moonlite (Macmillan, 1981)
- Plumbum (Penguin, 1983)
- Dog Rock: A Postal Pastoral (Dog Rock #1; Penguin, 1985)
- The Adventures of Christian Rosy Cross (Penguin, 1986)
- Testostero: A Comic Novel (Penguin, 1987)
- The Pale Blue Crochet Coathanger Cover (Dog Rock #2; Penguin, 1988)
- Mates of Mars (Penguin, 1991)
- The Glade Within the Grove (Vintage, 1996)
- In the New Country (Fourth Estate, 1999)
- The Land Where Stories End (Duffy & Snellgrove, 2002)
- Sons of the Rumour (Picador, 2009)
- Man of Letters (Dog Rock #3; Puncher & Wattmann, 2012)
- The Contemptuary (Puncher & Wattmann, 2018)

Short Stories and Novellas

- North South West: Three Novellas (Macmillan, 1973)
- Escape to Reality (Macmillan, 1977) - short story collection
- Hitting the Wall: Two Novellas (Penguin, 1989)

Poetry

- The Fleeing Atalanta (Maximus, 1975)
- The Ballad of Erinungarah (Vintage, 1997)
- Sunset on Santorini (Puncher & Wattman, 2012)
- Virgin's Milk (Puncher & Wattman, 2025)

Non-fiction

- Studs and Nogs: Essays 1987–98 (Vintage, 1999)
- A Year of Slow Food with Gerda Foster (Duffy & Snellgrove, 2002)
- The Niquab and the Mumkin (Puncher & Wattman, 2014)
