= Gilgamesh (novel) =

2001 novel by Joan London

- First edition
- Author: Joan London
- Language: English
- Genre: Novel
- Publisher: Pan Macmillan (AUS); Grove Press (US)
- Publication date: 2001
- Publication place: Australia
- Media type: Print (Hardback & paperback)
- Pages: 272 pp
- ISBN: 0-8021-4121-8
- OCLC: 55686981
- Followed by: The Good Parents

Gilgamesh, published in 2001, is the first full-length novel written by Joan London. It is inspired by the Epic of Gilgamesh, the world's oldest known poem.

In 2002, the novel was shortlisted for the Miles Franklin Literary Award and was selected as The Age Book of the Year for Fiction. The book has been published with some success in Australia, the United Kingdom, and the United States of America. It has also been published in Europe.

== Awards and honors ==
- Western Australian Premier's Book Awards, Fiction, 2001: shortlisted
- New South Wales Premier's Literary Awards, Christina Stead Prize for Fiction, 2002: shortlisted
- The Age Book of the Year Award, Fiction Prize, 2002: winner
- Miles Franklin Literary Award, 2002: shortlisted

Gilgamesh was listed in The New York Times Book Review section as one of the Notable Books of 2003.
