= Stravinsky's Lunch =

1999 novel by Drusilla Modjeska

- First edition
- Author: Drusilla Modjeska
- Language: English
- Publisher: Picador, Sydney
- Publication date: 1999
- Publication place: Australia
- Media type: Print hardback & paperback, illustrated
- Pages: 364
- ISBN: 0330361864
- Preceded by: Inner Cities: Australian women's memory of place
- Followed by: Timepieces

Stravinsky's Lunch (1999) is a biography by Australian author Drusilla Modjeska. It won the ALS Gold Medal and the New South Wales Premier's Literary Awards for Non-Fiction, both in 2000.

== Outline ==
The book is a feminist reappraisal of the lives and work of Australian painters Stella Bowen and Grace Cossington Smith.

== Reviews ==
Ann Skea, in her review for Eclectica Magazine noted: "Questions of compromise lie behind all the lives in this book, including Modjeska's, but this does not make it a dry book of philosophy or polemic. On the contrary, it is a rich and engrossing book about the lives of two Australian women artists, Stella Bowen (1893-1947) and Grace Cossington Smith (1892-1984), whose lives and art were very different and who dealt with this problem in very different ways. It is also a book which is richly illustrated. And Modjeska has a superb ability to describe paintings in such a way that the viewer/reader sees them anew with her, noticing subtle details and sharing the empathy she has developed with the artist through exploring that artist's life."

The Kirkus Review commentary was less forgiving: "The author does a careful job of describing the painters’ lives and methods, but as she progresses she allows more and more of herself into their story, until Smith and Bowen seem in danger of becoming mere foils for what becomes a tiresome self-reference...That’s all to the good, but her subjects get lost in the glare of her reflections—all solid stuff for the postmodern set but not much fun for anyone else. Still, Modjeska capably defends her interest in Bowen and Smith not only as artists, but also as women who for the most part set their own terms in a time when few women could get away with that."

== Awards and nominations ==
- 1999 winner Booksellers Choice Award
- 2000 winner ALS Gold Medal
- 2000 winner New South Wales Premier's Literary Awards for Non-Fiction
