= Arabella Edge =

Australian novelist

- Born: London, England
- Writing career
- Language: English
- Years active: 1994 –
- Notable work: The Company
- Notable awards: Commonwealth Writers' Prize

Arabella Edge (born in London, England) is a writer and novelist whose first work, The Company, received a 2001 Commonwealth Writers Prize and was shortlisted for the Miles Franklin Award.

== Early life ==
Edge had a French mother and attended the Lycée Français Charles de Gaulle in South Kensington. Edge graduated with an English Literature degree from Bristol University.

She moved to Sydney, Australia in 1992 and worked as an editor for several consumer illustrated magazines. Her short tales appeared in the literary illustrated magazines Westerly and Ulitarra. In 2002 Edge relocated from Sydney to the small township of Bicheno, Tasmania to work on her second novel.

== Major works ==
Her first novel, The Company, was published in 2000 and was a work of historical fiction based around the wreck of the Batavia on its maiden voyage off the Western Australian coast. The book was shortlisted for the 2001 Miles Franklin Award, and won the 2001 Commonwealth Writers' Prize for Best First Book in the Southeast Asia/South Pacific region.

A second novel, The God of Spring was published in 2005. Also a work of historical fiction, the novel is set during the French Revolution and based on the life of artist Théodore Géricault as he researches and completes his controversial painting, The Raft of the Medusa.

Her third novel, also historical fiction, is called Fields of Ice and was published in 2011. It follows Lady Jane Franklin and her attempts to raise money to fund a rescue mission for her husband, Sir John Franklin, whose ships HMS Erebus and HMS Terror were lost while trying to find the North West Passage.

== Personal life ==
Edge is married and has one stepdaughter.

== Awards ==
- 2001 — shortlisted Miles Franklin Award for The Company
- 2001 — winner Commonwealth Writers' Prize South East Asia and South Pacific Region, Best First Book Award for The Company
- 2001 — winner Herodotus Awards for Historical Mystery, Best International Book Award for The Company

== Selected works ==
=== Novels ===
- The Company: The Story of a Murderer (2000)
- The God of Spring (2005) aka The Raft
- Fields of Ice (2011)
