= The Good Parents =

2008 novel by Joan London

- First edition (AUS)
- Author: Joan London
- Language: English
- Genre: Novel
- Publisher: Vintage Books (AUS); Grove Press (US); Atlantic Books (UK)
- Publication date: April 2008
- Publication place: Australia
- Media type: Print (paperback)
- ISBN: 1-74166-793-3
- OCLC: 213329704
- Preceded by: Gilgamesh
- Followed by: The Golden Age

The Good Parents is a 2008 novel by Joan London.

== Synopsis ==
The book concerns an eighteen-year-old girl, Maya de Jong, who moves to Melbourne and becomes involved in a relationship with her boss. When Maya's parents come to Melbourne to stay with her, they find that Maya has disappeared. London says of the role of parents with older children, "There's nothing much you can do, except wait and be there".

== Awards and nominations ==
- 2009 New South Wales Premier's Literary Awards, Christina Stead Prize for Fiction
