= 1915: A Novel of Gallipoli =

1979 novel by Roger McDonald

- First edition
- Author: Roger McDonald
- Language: English
- Genre: Historical
- Published: 1979 (University of Queensland Press)
- Publication place: Australia
- Media type: Print (hardback)
- Pages: 426 pp
- ISBN: 9780702213755
- OCLC: 807526445

1915: A Novel of Gallipoli is the debut novel by Roger McDonald, published in 1979.

== Plot summary ==
The book is about two friends, Walter and Billy, who join the AIF and go to fight at Gallipoli. The novel follows the story of the two men from their adolescence in the Australian bush to their coming of age on the battlefields of World War I.

== Reception ==
Kirkus Reviews wrote "A standard kit of ingredients goes into this Australian WW I novel about a pair of friends, their girls, their fates in war—but it develops with a dimensional quality provided by some very good writing. ... True, McDonald can sometimes get a little bogged down with miniature effects of perception—which still and sap his most bash-about scenes. But this is a small complaint against what otherwise is a strong, though tenuous, book about destructive innocence—how it leads to tragedies large and small." Roger Hillman, writing in the Australian Humanities Review refers to it as one of the "key texts from the reception history of the Australian (Gallipoli) legend."

Kunapipi called it "outstanding" and wrote "It's a poet's novel, beautifully written; perhaps slower and longer than it should be, but a remarkable achievement and one that promises much from his next novel nevertheless."

== Awards and nominations ==
- Miles Franklin Award – nominated
- 1979 The Age Book of the Year – won

== Television adaptation ==
Peter Yeldham wrote the teleplay for the miniseries 1915, which is based on the novel. It aired on ABC TV from 27 June to 8 August 1982, and won two Logie Awards.
