= Michaela McGuire =

Australian journalist

Michaela McGuire is an Australian journalist, author, and literary host based in Melbourne, Australia.

== Early life and education ==
McGuire grew up in Brisbane before moving to Melbourne in 2008.

McGuire studied creative writing and journalism at the Queensland University of Technology.

== Career ==
She is the author of the nonfiction books Apply Within: Stories of career sabotage and Last Bets: A true story of gambling, morality and the law.

She has also worked as a journalist, including writing a column for The Monthly on current affairs, and features and book reviews for Fairfax Media.

Along with Marieke Hardy, she co-curated and hosted the popular international monthly literary event 'Women of Letters.' At the events, female writers and performers read letters they have written on set monthly themes. Started in Melbourne in 2010, the event now includes "shows across the United States and Britain, along with new Men of Letters shows and People of Letters shows – plus shows in Sydney, Tasmania and Perth." Featured readers have included Martha Wainwright, Edie Falco and Moby.

In December 2016, McGuire moved to Sydney to take up her appointment as Artistic Director of the Sydney Writers' Festival. In July 2020, the Melbourne Writers Festival announced McGuire's appointment as their new Artistic Director, to begin after the completion of their digital program in August 2020.
