= Kim Mahood =

Australian writer and artist

- Born: 1953 (age 72–73)
- Writing career
- Notable work: Craft for a Dry Lake

Kim Mahood (born 1953) is an Australian writer and artist based in Wamboin, New South Wales. She spends several months each year in the Tanami and Great Sandy Desert regions where she grew up.

Mahood grew up on Mongrel Downs in the Northern Territory of Australia, which was subsequently known as Tanami Downs Station; this area is now owned by the Mangkururrpa Aboriginal Land Trust. Her early life there features heavily in her literary work, including in her two-part biography Craft for a Dry Lake (2000) and Position Doubtful: Mapping Landscapes and Memories (2016). She has maintained strong connections with the Warlpiri traditional owners of Mongrel Down and with the families of the Walmajarri stockmen who worked with her family.

== Biography ==
Mahood was born in 1953 to parents, Alexander (always known as Joe) and Marie Mahood, who had worked across the Northern Territory on various cattle stations and, when Mahood was born, her father was employed by the Department of Native Affairs on the newly established Hooker Creek Native Settlement (now known as Lajamanu) until they relocated due to Mahood's health deteriorating and they were relocated to Beswick in Arnhem Land.

However, due to a number of frustrations of the bureaucracy of working for the Department of Native Affairs, Mahood's father soon left to work for Colonel Rose in the animal industry branch (AIB) and this job meant that the family travelled throughout the Northern Territory on a regular basis and the family spent four years living in Finke as a part of her father's role.

When the family left Finke, now with four children, the family relocated to Alice Springs before where her father pursued work as a cartoonist and her mother taught French at the local high school.

The Mahood family took up the lease on Mongrel Downs Station in 1962 alongside Bill Wilson. There are many stories and disagreements about where this name came from with many Warlipiri people believing it is a distortion of the Warlpiri name for Lake Ruth, Monkarrurpa, while a former NT Administrator believed it was a personal dig at him. However, Mahood believes that it is in response to the popular perception that it was a "mongrel bit of country" and that they were crazy to try to establish a station there.

In 1971 the partnership between Joe Mahood and Bill Wilson dissolved and the Mahood family moved to Central Queensland, where they established Cattle Camp Station. Joe was killed helicopter mustering in 1990 and this sad event prompted Mahood to make her first trip back to Mongrel Downs in 1992.

Mahood's first biography, Craft for a Dry Lake (2000), which won the NSW Premier's Award for non-fiction and was named The Age Book of the Year for non-fiction, is the result of this journey and she says:

I went like a fugitive among my father's papers... I could feel myself disappear into a wilderness of spinifex and claypans and mulga. My father's voice reached out and took hold of me as it had always done. The place and its story seemed to blot out my life, as if nothing had happened to me before or since. And the irony was that so little of it was my story.

— Kim Mahood, Craft for a Dry Lake

Mahood won the 2013 Peter Blazey Fellowship for manuscript development.

Mahood's second biography, Position Doubtful: Mapping Landscapes and Memories (2016) tracks her itinerant life and work since her first and remains focused on Central Australia and exploring her "unusual position at the interface of cultures". This book was shortlisted for the 2017 Victorian Premier's Award for non-fiction, the Queensland Literary Awards, the ACT Book of the Year and the National Biography Award.

Wandering with Intent (2022) is Mahood's third major work and is a collection of essays, many of which had been published earlier in essay format, including "Blow-ins on the cold desert wind" (2007) and "Kartiya are like Toyotas: white workers on Australia's cultural frontier" (2012), both of which were originally published in the Griffith Review. Mahood says of these essays:

I write about what happens at the point of intersection, where traditional culture is still strong, where whites are in the minority but occupy most of the official positions, and where the unfolding narrative is complicated, nuanced, and evolving […] That I exercise cultural privilege when writing about the desert Aboriginal people is a given. The question is whether I exercise this privilege in a way that can be justified. I have been grappling with this conundrum since I began writing, and it never gets any easier.

— Kim Mahood, "Kim Mahood’s Wandering with Intent redefines the Australian frontier", via The Conversation

Wandering with Intent (2022) was the winner of the 2023 The Age Book of the Year Award for non-fiction.

Mahood is a regular contributor to the Griffith Review and The Monthly.

== Bibliography ==
=== Books ===
- Craft for a Dry Lake (2000)
- Position Doubtful: Mapping Landscapes and Memories (2016)
- Wandering with Intent: Essays (2022)

=== Other publications ===
A full list of Mahood's publications are available through AustLIT.

=== Book reviews ===
Year	Review article	Work(s) reviewed
2021	Mahood, Kim (January–February 2021). "Tjanima's story : a parable of redemption through family". Australian Book Review. 428: 20.	Ngaanyatjarra Pitjantjatjara Yunkunytjatjara Women's Council (2020). Tjanimaku Tjukurpa : how one man came good. Alice Springs: Ngaanyatjarra Pitjantjatjara Yunkunytjatjara Women's Council.
