= Drylands (novel) =

1999 novel by Thea Astley

- First edition
- Author: Thea Astley
- Language: English
- Publisher: Penguin Books, Australia
- Publication date: 1999
- Publication place: Australia
- Media type: Print (Hardback & Paperback)
- Pages: 293
- ISBN: 0-670-88619-X
- OCLC: 42402469
- Dewey Decimal: 823/.914 21
- LC Class: PR9619.3.A75 D79 1999
- Preceded by: The Multiple Effects of Rainshadow
- Followed by: -

Drylands (1999) (subtitled "A Book for the World's Last Reader") is a Miles Franklin Award-winning novel by Australian author Thea Astley. This novel shared the award with Benang by Kim Scott.

Drylands was Astley's final novel, and her fourth to win the Miles Franklin Award.

== Plot summary ==
The opening, closing and linking chapters of this novel describe introspections and observations by Janet Deakin. Janet lives in a small fictitious central Queensland town, "Drylands", and continues to run the local newsagency following the death of her farmer husband, Ted.

Drylands and surrounds - offset by the relative escape represented by the coastal Queensland city of Rockhampton, and by "the coast" - provides a dusty backdrop for the disheartening experiences of several local residents and town visitors.

Intermitting chapters narrate the lives and misfortunes of a refugee from bureaucracy, Franzi Massig, a consulting writer, Evie, an unsuccessful farmer, Jim Randler and his neighbour's teenage son Toff, an Aboriginal man, Benny Shoforth, an overwrought housewife, Lannie Cunneen, and a frightened barmaid, Joss. Their lives intersect with other central and lesser characters, culminating in a depressing, perhaps "dystopian" patchwork view of life in a relatively remote Australian town.

Most of the main characters end up having to leave Drylands and move to the coast, as life in the town becomes increasingly unsustainable.

== Themes ==
Astley focuses on issues such as Australian male violence, particularly directed against women (but also generally), with the theme of violence to women reiterated in several parts of the novel and portrayed as one of the main reasons why such towns may be very challenging to live in. She also engages with other social problems such as corruption in bureaucracies and communities, pub culture, increasing teenage violence, historic and contemporary mistreatment of Aboriginal people, the difficulty of farming and surviving in Australia's dry outback regions, and the nature of various kinds of work.

Furthermore, Astley is concerned with the importance of the written word to represent "reality" in a way that can be understood by readers, and the potential erosion of this type of understanding, and its facilitation of imagination, through the inroads of our screen-based society.

== Awards ==
- Miles Franklin Literary Award, 2000: joint winner, shared with indigenous author Kim Scott, for his novel Benang: From the Heart.
- Queensland Premier's Literary Awards, Best Fiction Book, 2000: winner.

== Reviews ==
- Goldsworthy, Kerryn (September 1999), "Undimmed Outrage, Fiction review", Australian Book Review, archived from the original on 29 September 2007
- Kerryn Goldsworthy: "Drylands is Astley's Waste Land, with a cast of exhausted and alienated characters wandering through it in the death-grip of entropy, pursued by fin-de-siècle furies and other personifications of failure and defeat. In the small town of Drylands there are no fragments shored against anybody's ruin (well, there are, but even the fragments get vandalized and tossed), and there is certainly none of the peace that passeth understanding."

== Notes ==
For a description of "drylands" see biomes.

== See also ==
- 1999 in Australian literature
- Middlemiss.org
