= Isobel on the Way to the Corner Shop =

1999 novel by Australian writer Amy Witting

- Author: Amy Witting
- Language: English
- Genre: Fiction
- Publisher: Penguin
- Publication date: 31 July 1999
- Publication place: Australia
- Media type: Print
- Pages: 352 pp.
- Awards: The Age Book of the Year Award - Fiction winner 2000
- ISBN: 0140286349
- Preceded by: Maria's War
- Followed by: After Cynthia

Isobel on the Way to the Corner Shop (1999) is a novel by Australian writer Amy Witting. It was originally published by Penguin in Australia in 1999.

This was the second novel by the author to feature her character Isobel Callaghan, following I is for Isobel (1989).

== Synopsis ==
Isobel Callaghan collapses on the way to her local corner shop and wakes to find herself in hospital. There she discovers that she is being moved to a sanatorium in the Blue Mountains.

== Publishing history ==
After its initial publication in Australia by Penguin in 1999, the novel was reprinted by Text Publishing in 2015.

== Awards ==
- The Age Book of the Year Award - Fiction winner 2000

== See also ==
- 1999 in Australian literature
