= Joan London (Australian author) =

Australian novelist and short story writer

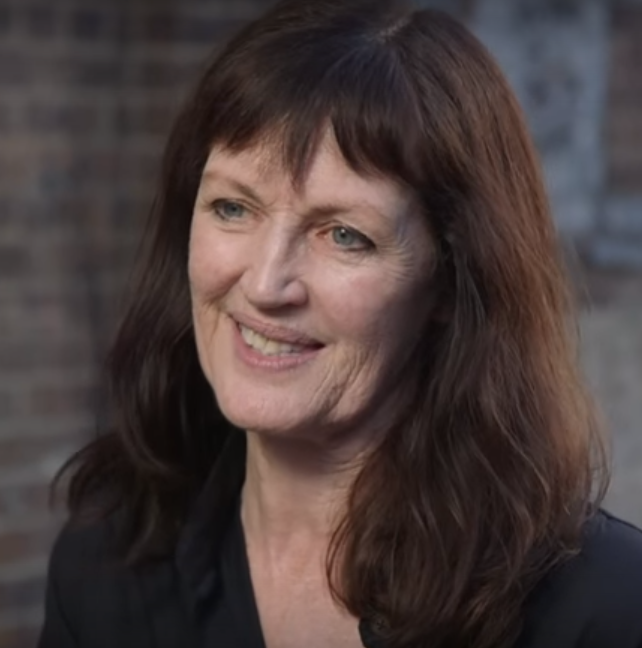
- London in 2015
- Born: Joan Elizabeth London; 1948 (age 77–78); Perth, Western Australia
- Education: University of Western Australia
- Writing career
- Language: English
- Notable works: Gilgamesh, The Good Parents
- Notable awards: Christina Stead Prize for Fiction, Age Book of the Year Fiction Award, Patrick White Award

Joan Elizabeth London (born 1948) is an Australian author of short stories, screenplays and novels.

== Biography ==
She graduated from the University of Western Australia, having studied English and French; she has taught English as a second language and is a bookseller. She lives in Fremantle, Western Australia.

London is the author of two collections of stories. The first, Sister Ships and Other Stories, won The Age Book of the Year (1986), and the second, Letter to Constantine, won the Steele Rudd Award and the Western Australian Premier's Book Award for Fiction (both in 1994). The two were published together as The New Dark Age. She has published three novels, Gilgamesh (2001), The Good Parents (2008) and The Golden Age (2014).

She was awarded the Patrick White Award and the Nita Kibble Literary Award in 2015.

== Awards and nominations ==
Year	Work	Award	Category	Result	Ref.
1986	Sister Ships	The Age Book of the Year Awards	Book of the Year	Won	
1986	Sister Ships	The Age Book of the Year Awards	Fiction Book of the Year	Won	
1986	Sister Ships	Western Australia Week Literary Award	—	Won	
1994	Letter to Constantine	Queensland Literary Awards	Steele Rudd Award	Won	
1994	Letter to Constantine	Western Australian Premier's Book Awards	Fiction	Won	
2001	Gilgamesh	Western Australian Premier's Book Awards	Fiction	Shortlisted	
2002	Gilgamesh	The Age Book of the Year Awards	Fiction Book of the Year	Won	
2002	Gilgamesh	Miles Franklin Award	—	Shortlisted	
2002	Gilgamesh	New South Wales Premier's Literary Awards	Fiction	Shortlisted	
2003	Gilgamesh	Tasmania Pacific Rim Region Prize	—	Shortlisted	
2004	Gilgamesh	Orange Prize for Fiction	—	Longlisted	
2009	The Good Parents	New South Wales Premier's Literary Awards	Christina Stead Prize for Fiction	Won	
2015	—	Patrick White Award	—	Won	
2015	The Golden Age	Miles Franklin Award	—	Shortlisted	
2015	The Golden Age	Nita Kibble Literary Award	Nita Kibble Literary Award	Won	
2015	The Golden Age	Prime Minister's Literary Award	—	Won	

== Bibliography ==
=== Short stories ===
- Sister Ships and Other Stories (1986)
- Letter to Constantine (1993)
- The New Dark Age (2004)

=== Novels ===
- Gilgamesh (2001)
- The Good Parents (2008)
- The Golden Age (2014)

== See also ==
- Wilde, W., Hooton, J. & Andrews, B (1994) The Oxford Companion of Australian Literature 2nd ed. South Melbourne, Oxford University Press
