= Roger McDonald =

Australian author (born 1941)

- Born: Hugh Roger McDonald; 23 June 1941 (age 85); Young, New South Wales
- Writing career
- Language: English
- Years active: 1962–
- Notable work: The Ballad of Desmond Kale
- Notable awards: Miles Franklin Award, 2006

Hugh Roger McDonald (born 23 June 1941 in Young, New South Wales) is an Australian author of several novels and a number of non-fiction works. He is also an accomplished poet and TV scriptwriter.

== Life and career ==
The middle son of a Presbyterian minister, Hugh Fraser McDonald (1909–81), and Central Queensland historian Lorna McDonald (1916–2017), his childhood was spent in the NSW country towns of Bribbaree, Temora, and Bourke, before the family moved to Sydney. He attended Scots College and the University of Sydney.

He was briefly a teacher, ABC producer, and publisher's editor in NSW, Tasmania, and Queensland, before moving to Canberra and taking up writing full-time in 1976, in order to complete his first novel, 1915. McDonald has since 1980 lived near Braidwood, NSW, apart from periods in Sydney and New Zealand.

1915 won The Age Book of the Year Award in 1979 and the South Australian Biennial Literature Prize in 1980. In 1982 it was made into a seven-part ABC-TV television series. (Scripting: Peter Yeldham)

Shearers' Motel won the 1993 Banjo National Book Council Banjo Award for non-fiction. It was filmed as Cross Turning Over for ABC-TV in 1996 (Director: Robert Klenner)

McDonald was nominated for the Miles Franklin Award in 1994 for Water Man, and in 1999 for Mr. Darwin's Shooter, which in that year won the New South Wales Premier's Literary Award, the Victorian Premier's Literary Award, the South Australian Premier's Awards, and the Adelaide Festival Book of the Year.

The Ballad of Desmond Kale won the Miles Franklin Award in 2006 and the Adelaide Festival Prize for Fiction in 2008. McDonald won the O. Henry Award in 2008 for "The Bullock Run" (USA). This story forms the basis of chapters 15 and 16 of When Colts Ran.

McDonald's eighth novel, When Colts Ran, 2010, was shortlisted for the 2011 Miles Franklin Award, the 2011 Victorian Premier's Prize for Fiction, and the 2011 Prime Minister's Literary Award for Fiction.

His ninth novel, The Following, was published in 2013. A fictionalised reimagining of the life of Australian Prime Minister Ben Chifley, the story centres on the rise to prominence and legacy of Marcus Friendly. Of the book, Sydney Morning Herald reviewer Daniel Herborn wrote: 'The Following is just as interested in the sweep of history as in those who are caught up in, and occasionally influence, the great social changes it surveys. Its themes of destiny, sectarianism and political patronage echo across generations as the influence of Friendly rises and wanes.'

His tenth novel, A Sea-Chase was published in October 2017. The book follows the fortunes of young teacher Judy Compton. After fleeing a rioting classroom one dismal Friday, she gets drunk and wakes up on a boat. Overnight her life changes; she is in love with being on the water and in love with Wes Bannister. But then events at sea challenge everything she holds dearest.

== Bibliography ==
=== Novels ===
- 1915 (1979)
- Slipstream (1982)
- Melba (1988) (film novelisation)
- Rough Wallaby (1988)
- Flynn (1992) (film novelisation)
- Water Man (1993)
- The Slap (1996)
- Mr. Darwin's Shooter (1998)
- The Ballad of Desmond Kale (2006)
- When Colts Ran (2010)
- The Following (2013)
- A Sea-Chase (2017)

=== Non-fiction ===
- Michael Willesee's Australians (1988)
- Shearers' Motel (1992)
- Australia's Flying Doctors (1994) (text for Richard Woldendorp photographs)
- Barry Humphries' Flashbacks (1999)
- The Tree in Changing Light (2001)
- Wool: The Australian Story (2003) (text for Richard Woldendorp photographs)
- Australia's Wild Places (2009)

=== Poetry ===
- Citizens of Mist (1969)
- Airship (1975)

=== Edited ===
- The First Paperback Poets Anthology (1974)
- Gone Bush (1990)

=== Television scripts ===
- Private John Simpson (1987)
- Melba (1988)
- Cross Turning Over (1995), part of the anthology series Naked: Stories of Men
