= Amy Witting =

Australian novelist and poet

- Born: Joan Austral Fraser; 26 January 1918; Sydney, Australia
- Died: 18 September 2001 (aged 83); Sydney, Australia
- Other names: De Guesclin, Joan Austral Levick
- Occupations: Novelist, poet and teacher
- Spouse: Les Levick
- Children: 1
- Website: Amy Witting website

Amy Witting (26 January 1918 – 18 September 2001) was the pen name of Australian novelist and poet Joan Austral Fraser, born Joan Austral Fraser. She has been described as one of Australia's "finest fiction writers, whose work was full of the atmosphere and colour of times past".

== Life ==
Amy Witting was born Joan Austral Fraser in the Sydney suburb of Annandale and was raised Catholic. She had "melancholy memories of a repressive family life" and remembered the nuns at her school, St Brendan's College, as being "obsessed with the torments of hell". She suffered from tuberculosis as a child.

She attended Fort Street Girls' High School. She studied languages at the University of Sydney, where she met figures including James McAuley, Harold Stewart, and Dorothy Auchterlonie Green. Subsequently, she earned a Diploma of Education at Teachers College and became a school teacher. Tuberculosis recurred in her early adulthood, leading to time spent in a sanatorium which "gave her, for a time, the peace and solitude she always craved".

On 28 July 1934, at age 16, one of her poems, written under the pseudonym De Guesclin, was published in The Sydney Morning Herald. Witting always wrote under a pseudonym. She adopted "Amy Witting" from a promise she made to herself "never to give up on consciousness", to "always remain 'witting'" rather than "unwitting".

Witting married Les Levick, a fellow high school teacher, in 1948; they had one son, Greg. She continued to write until her death from cancer in 2001, a few weeks after the publication of After Cynthia, her final novel.

== Career ==
For most of Witting's career, teaching English and French and earning a living took precedence, with writing done in her spare time. Established Australian writer Thea Astley, who taught with Witting at Cheltenham Girls High School, was impressed by one of her stories, Goodbye, Ady, Goodbye, Joe, and encouraged her to submit it for publication. It was published in The New Yorker in April 1965. The poet Kenneth Slessor reportedly told Thea Astley to "tell that woman I'll publish any word she writes".

In 1974, using the pseudonym Chris Willoughby, Witting wrote a lampoon for Tabloid Story prompted by her anger at "the sexism of the Frank Moorhouse/Michael Wilding tabloid Story tales of sex with an unconscious drugged girl at a party". Her story caused outrage among parents, politicians, and teachers; the Minister for Education accused her of corrupting children and stated in Parliament that "Amy Witting is a scribbler on lavatory walls". However, this controversy did not derail her career, and three years later she became mistress of modern languages at North Sydney Girls' High School.

Witting's significant literary success came late in life, particularly after retirement allowed her to devote more time to writing. Her first novel, The Visit, was published in 1977 by editor Beatrice Davis. However, Davis rejected Witting's second novel, I for Isobel, stating "No mother has ever behaved so badly", and McPhee Gribble also rejected it, commenting, "It's difficult to see what market you had in mind for it". Despite this, it was published by Penguin Books in 1990 and became an instant best seller. The publication of this book brought her talent wider recognition.

Critic Peter Craven suggests that while Witting's "poetry is the work of a writer who has mastery of any meaning she wishes to convey," her fiction "took some time to reach fruition, partly because the publishing climate which would be receptive to Witting's brand of realism had to wait the advent of such writers as Helen Garner." Craven writes that "Witting was a great master of realism, a naturalist who could render a nuance in a line that might take a lesser writer a page."

Witting's last three works – Isobel on the Way to the Corner Shop, Faces and Voices, and After Cynthia – were written under challenging circumstances, as her sight and hearing were failing, and she was battling cancer.

== Awards and nominations ==
- 1990: Shortlisted for the Miles Franklin Award for I for Isobel
- 1993: Patrick White Award
- 2000: Winner of The Age Book of the Year Fiction Prize for Faces and Voices
- 2000: Shortlisted for the Miles Franklin Award for Isobel on the Way to the Corner Shop
- 2002: Posthumously appointed Member of the Order of Australia (AM) for "service to Australian literature as a novelist, poet and short story writer, and as a mentor to younger writers".

== Bibliography ==
Novels

- The Visit (1977) ISBN 0-17-005184-6
- I for Isobel (1990) ISBN 0-14-012624-4
- A Change in the Lighting (1994) ISBN 0-14-024937-0
- Maria's War (1998) ISBN 1-86442-399-4
- Isobel on the Way to the Corner Shop (1999) ISBN 0-14-028634-9
- After Cynthia (2001) ISBN 0-14-029915-7

Short story collections

- Marriages (1990)
- In and Out the Window (1995)
- Faces and Voices (2000)
- Selected Stories (2017)

Poetry

- Travel Diary (1985) ISBN 0-94-955706-4
- Beauty is the Straw (1991) ISBN 0-20-717102-5
- Collected Poems (1998) ISBN 0-14-058903-1
