= Mr. Darwin's Shooter =

1998 novel by Roger McDonald

Mr Darwin's Shooter
- First edition
- Author: Roger McDonald
- Language: English
- Genre: Historical fiction
- Publisher: Random House Australia
- Publication date: 1998 (28 years ago)
- Publication place: Australia
- Media type: Print
- ISBN: 978-0-09-183670-2
- OCLC: 222251494

Mr Darwin's Shooter is a 1998 novel by Roger McDonald. It describes the life of Syms Covington, manservant to Charles Darwin during Darwin's voyage aboard HMS Beagle.

The book deals with three periods of Covington's life: childhood, adolescence while on HMS Beagle, and middle age, where Covington is struggling to deal with the conflict between his religious views and his role in the formulation of the theory of natural selection. Among the many animals Syms Covington shot and prepared for Charles Darwin were the Galápagos finches, which became crucial for his theory.

== Notes ==
- Dedication: To Elinor, Anna and Stella with love and to Susie with your spirit shining.

== Publication history ==
After the novel's initial publication by Random House Australia in 1998 it was republished as follows:

- 1998, Anchor, UK
- 1998, Atlantic Monthly Press, USA
- 1999, Vintage, Australia
- 1999, Grove Press, USA
- 2009, Vintage, Australia

The novel was also translated into Spanish, in 2001 and German in 2002.

== Awards and nominations ==
- 1999 NSW Premier's Literary Awards for Fiction, winner
- 1999 Victorian Premier's Literary Awards for Fiction, winner
- 2000 Adelaide Festival Awards for Literature, winner

== See also ==
- 1998 in Australian literature
