= Drusilla Modjeska =

Australian writer and editor

- Born: 1946 (age 79–80); London
- Occupations: Writer and editor

Drusilla Modjeska (born 1946) is a contemporary Australian writer and editor.

== Life ==
Modjeska was born in London and was raised in Hampshire. She spent several years in Papua New Guinea (where she was briefly a student at the University of Papua New Guinea) before arriving in Australia in 1971. She studied for an undergraduate degree at the Australian National University before completing a PhD in history at the University of New South Wales which was published as Exiles at Home: Australian Women Writers 1925–1945 (1981).

Modjeska's writing often explores the boundaries between fiction and non-fiction. The best known of her work are Poppy (1990), a fictionalised biography of her mother, and Stravinsky's Lunch (2001), a feminist reappraisal of the lives and work of Australian painters Stella Bowen and Grace Cossington Smith. She has also edited several volumes of stories, poems and essays, including the work of Lesbia Harford and a 'Focus on Papua New Guinea' issue for the literary magazine Meanjin.

In 2006, Modjeska was a senior research fellow at the University of Sydney, "investigating the interplay of race, gender and the arts in post-colonial Papua New Guinea".

== Awards ==
- 1983 – Walter McRae Russell Award for Exiles at Home
- 1991 – New South Wales Premier's Literary Awards, Douglas Stewart Prize for non-fiction for Poppy
- 1995 – New South Wales Premier's Literary Awards, Douglas Stewart Prize for non-fiction for The Orchard
- 2000 – New South Wales Premier's Literary Awards, Douglas Stewart Prize for non-fiction for Stravinsky's Lunch
- 2000 – ALS Gold Medal for Stravinsky's Lunch

== Bibliography ==
=== Novels ===
- —— (1990). Poppy. McPhee Gribble. ISBN 086914099X.
- —— (1994). The Orchard. Picador. ISBN 0330356550. Archived from the original on 29 September 2007.
- —— (2012). The Mountain. ISBN 9781741666502.

=== Non-fiction ===
- Women Writers: A Study in Australian Cultural History, 1920–1939 (1979) PhD. thesis
- —— (1981). Exiles at Home : Australian Women Writers 1925–1945. ISBN 0207146160.
- —— (1989). Inner Cities: Australian Women's Memory of Place. ISBN 0140106839.
- —— (1999). Stravinsky's Lunch. Picador. ISBN 0330361864.
- —— (2002). Timepieces. Sydney: Picador. ISBN 0330363727.
- —— (2015). Second Half First. ISBN 9780857989796.
- —— (2025). A Woman's Eye, Her Art. ISBN 9780143795711.

=== Edited ===
- Modjeska, Drusilla, ed. (1985). The Poems of Lesbia Harford. ISBN 0207151571.
- Modjeska, Drusilla, ed. (1995). Sisters. Sydney: Angus & Robertson. ISBN 0207190321.
- Modjeska, Drusilla, ed. (2006). The Best Australian Essays. Black Inc. ISBN 1863952780.

=== Selected book reviews ===
- Modjeska, Drusilla (March 2009). "Arise!". The Monthly. 43: 60–62. Review of Philip Roth, Indignation.
