= 1997 Australian Film Institute Awards =

Australian film and TV awards ceremony

39th Australian Film Institute Awards

Highlights
- Best Film: Kiss or Kill
- Most awards: Film: Kiss or Kill (5); TV: Frontline, Good Guys, Bad Guys, Simone de Beauvoir's Babies (2)
- Most nominations: Film: TV:

The 39th Australian Film Institute Awards (generally known as the AFI Awards) were held in 1997. Presented by the Australian Film Institute (AFI), the awards celebrated the best in Australian feature film, documentary, short film and television productions of 1997. Bill Bennett's Kiss or Kill won five awards for feature films, with Doing Time for Patsy Cline winning four. Producer Jan Chapman received the Raymond Longford Award for lifetime achievement.

== Winners and nominees ==
Winners are listed first and highlighted in boldface.

=== Feature film ===
Best Film	Best Achievement in Direction
**Kiss or Kill – Bill Bennett, Jennifer Bennett**; Blackrock – David Elfick; Doing Time for Patsy Cline – Chris Kennedy, John Winter; The Well – Sandra Levy	**Bill Bennett – Kiss or Kill**; Chris Kennedy – Doing Time for Patsy Cline; David Caesar – Idiot Box; Samantha Lang – The Well
Best Performance by an Actor in a Leading Role	Best Performance by an Actress in a Leading Role
**Richard Roxburgh – Doing Time for Patsy Cline**; Jeremy Sims – Idiot Box; Matt Day – Kiss or Kill; Michael Caton – The Castle	**Pamela Rabe – The Well**; Frances O'Connor – Kiss or Kill; Frances O'Connor – Thank God He Met Lizzie; Miranda Otto – The Well
Best Performance by an Actor in a Supporting Role	Best Performance by an Actress in a Supporting Role
**Andrew S. Gilbert – Kiss or Kill**; Simon Lyndon – Blackrock; Chris Haywood – Kiss Or Kill; Charles 'Bud' Tingwell – The Castle	**Cate Blanchett – Thank God He Met Lizzie**; Rebecca Smart – Blackrock; Annie Byron – Doing Time for Patsy Cline; Sophie Lee – The Castle
Best Original Screenplay	Best Screenplay Adapted from Another Source
**Santo Cilauro, Tom Gleisner, Jane Kennedy, Rob Sitch – The Castle**; Chris Kennedy – Doing Time for Patsy Cline; Bill Bennett – Kiss or Kill; Alison Tilson – Road to Nhill	**Laura Jones – The Well**; Nick Enright – Blackrock; Carl Schultz – Love in Ambush
Best Achievement in Cinematography	Best Achievement in Editing
**Andrew Lesnie – Doing Time for Patsy Cline**; Martin McGrath ACS – Blackrock; Malcolm McCulloch – Kiss or Kill; Mandy Walker – The Well	**Henry Dangar – Kiss or Kill**; Mark Perry – Idiot Box; Suresh Ayyar – Thank God He Met Lizzie; Dany Cooper – The Well
Best Achievement in Sound	Best Original Music Score
**Wayne Pashley, Toivo Lember, Gethin Creagh – Kiss or Kill**; John Dennison, Tony Vaccher, John Patterson, Craig Butters, Chris Alderton – Doing Time for Patsy Cline; Liam Egan, Phil Judd, David White, Alicia Slusarski – Idiot Box; Annie Breslin, Gethin Creagh, Bronwyn Murphy – The Well	**Peter Best – Doing Time for Patsy Cline**; Tim Rogers, Nick Launay – Idiot Box; Elizabeth Drake – Road to Nhill; Stephen Rae – The Well
Best Achievement in Production Design	Best Achievement in Costume Design
**Michael Philips – The Well**; Roger Ford – Doing Time for Patsy Cline; Kerith Holmes – Idiot Box; Clarissa Patterson – Thank God He Met Lizzie	**Louise Wakefield – Doing Time for Patsy Cline**; Ruth De la Lande – Kiss or Kill; Edie Kurzer – Thank God He Met Lizzie; Anna Borghesi – The Well

=== Non-feature film ===
Best Documentary	Best Short Fiction Film
**Mabo: Life of an Island Man – Trevor Graham (director)**; Colour Bars – Mahmoud Yekta (director); Exile in Sarajevo – Tahir Cambis, Alma Sahbaz (director); The Butler – Anna Kannava (director)	**The Beneficiary – Graeme Burfoot (director)**; Boy – Glenn Fraser (director); Flying Over Mother – Michael James Rowland (director); Revisionism – Rachel Landers (director)
Best Short Animation Film	Best Screenplay in a Short Film
**Uncle – Adam Elliot (director)**; Heartbreak Motel – Greg Holfeld (director); His Mother's Voice – Dennis Tupicoff (director); On A Full Moon – Lee Whitmore (director)	**Stuart McDonald – My Second Car**; Glenn Fraser, Chris Wheeler – Boy; Della Churchill – Little White Lies; Rachel Landers – Revisionism
Best Achievement in Cinematography in a Non-Feature Film	Best Achievement in Editing in a Non-Feature Film
**Ulrich Krafzik, Wade Fairley, Ian Pugsley – The Human Race**; Marcus Struzina – Franz and Kafka; Max Davis – House Taken Over; Rory McGuinness – The Art of Tracking	**Stewart Young – Year of the Dogs**; Martin Connor – Final Cut; Nash Edgerton – Prick; Jane Usher – S.O.S.
Best Achievement in Sound in a Non-Feature Film	Open Craft Award
**Linda Murdoch, Martin Oswin – At Sea**; Mark Tarpey, David Harrison – Hospital: An Unhealthy Business; Vladimir Divlijan – The Drip; Paul Healy, Andrew Lancaster, Tony Vaccher – Urban Fairytale	**Bruce Belsham, Victoria Pitt (for research & script) – Frontier: Worse Than Slavery Itself**; Sue Ford, Ben Ford (for innovation in form) – Faces 1976–1996; Anna Kannava (for direction) – The Butler; Leverne McDonnell (for performance) – Trunk

=== Additional awards ===
Raymond Longford Award	Byron Kennedy Award
**Jan Chapman**	**John Polson**
Young Actors Award	Best Foreign Film
**Jeffrey Walker – The Wayne Manifesto (ABC)**	**Secrets & Lies – Simon Channing-Williams**; Breaking the Waves – Vibeke Windelov, Peter Aalbaek Jensen; The English Patient – Saul Zaentz; William Shakespeare's Romeo and Juliet – Gabriella Martinelli, Baz Luhrmann

=== Television ===
Best Episode in a Television Drama Series	Best Television Mini-Series or Telefeature
**Frontline, Season 3 - Episode 13, 'Epitaph' (ABC) – Rob Sitch, Santo Cilauro, Jane Kennedy, Tom Gleisner**; Frontline, Season 3 - Episode 3, 'The Shadow We Cast' (ABC) – Rob Sitch, Santo Cilauro, Jane Kennedy, Tom Gleisner; Good Guys, Bad Guys, Series 1 - Episode 1, '1.8 Million Reasons To Change Your Name Part 1' (Nine Network) – Roger Le Mesurier, Roger Simpson, Ros Tatarka; Good Guys, Bad Guys, Series 1 - Episode 2, '1.8 Million Reasons To Change Your Name Part 2' (Nine Network) – Roger Le Mesurier, Roger Simpson, Ros Tatarka	**Good Guys, Bad Guys - Telemovie Pilot 'Only The Young Die Good' (Nine Network) – Roger Le Mesurier, Roger Simpson, Ros Tatarka**; Kangaroo Palace (Seven Network) – Ewan Burnett; Simone de Beauvoir's Babies (ABC) – Andrew Knight, Denise Patience, Deborah Cox; The Last of the Ryans (Nine Network) – Richard Brennan
Best Episode in a Television Drama Serial	Best Children's Television Drama
**Neighbours - Episode 2842 (Network Ten) – Peter Dodds**; Home and Away - 'The Earthquake' (Seven Network) – Russell Webb; Neighbours - Episode 2911 (Network Ten) – Peter Dodds	**The Wayne Manifesto - Episode 20, 'Amy Pastrami Day' (ABC) – Alan Hardy**; Return to Jupiter - Episode 1, 'Shipwreck' (ABC) – Terry Jennings; The Wayne Manifesto - Episode 11, 'Junk' (ABC) – Alan Hardy; The Wayne Manifesto - Episode 5, 'Pizza (ABC) – Alan Hardy
Best Performance by an Actor in a Leading Role in a Television Drama	Best Performance by an Actress in a Leading Role in a Television Drama
**David Wenham – Simone de Beauvoir's Babies (ABC)**; Geoff Morrell – Fallen Angels - Episode 15, 'Pig In Shit' (ABC); Marcus Graham – Good Guys, Bad Guys (Nine Network); Jeremy Sims – Kangaroo Palace (Seven Network)	**Anne Looby – Simone de Beauvoir's Babies - Episode 3 (ABC)**; Leah Purcell – Fallen Angels - Episode 14, 'Love Is In The Air' (ABC); Nadine Garner – Raw FM - Episode 2, 'Desperately Seeking Su Lin' (ABC); Sally Cooper – Simone De Beauvoir's Babies - Episode 4 (ABC)
Best Achievement in Direction in a Television Drama	Best Screenplay in a Television Drama
**Brendan Maher – Good Guys, Bad Guys, Series 1 - Episode 2, '1.8 Million Reasons To Change Your Name Part 2' (Nine Network)**; Brendan Maher – Good Guys, Bad Guys, Series 1 - Episode 1, '1.8 Million Reasons To Change Your Name Part 1' (Nine Network); Catherine Millar – Twisted Tales - Episode 11, 'Directly From My Heart To You' (Nine Network)	**Rob Sitch, Santo Cilauro, Jane Kennedy, Tom Gleisner – Frontline, Season 3 - Episode 7, 'The Simple Life' (ABC)**; Rob Sitch, Santo Cilauro, Jane Kennedy, Tom Gleisner – Frontline, Season 3 - Episode 13, 'Epitaph' (ABC); Graeme Koetsveld – Good Guys, Bad Guys, Series 1 - Episode 2, '1.8 Million Reasons To Change Your Name Part 2' (Nine Network); Deborah Cox – Simone De Beauvoir's Babies - Episode 3 (ABC)
Best Television Documentary
**Dhuway (SBS) – Lew Griffiths, Noel Pearson**; Night of the Bogongs (ABC) – Klaus Toft; The Last of the Nomads (SBS) – Peter du Cane, Samantha Kelley; You Always Hurt The Ones You Love (ABC) – David Flatman, Sue Flatman
