= 1983 in Australian literature =

This article presents a list of the historical events and publications of Australian literature during 1983.

== Events ==
- The judges of the 1983 Miles Franklin Award announced there was no book entered of sufficient merit to receive the award.

== Major publications ==
=== Novels ===
- Brian Castro — Birds of Passage
- Elizabeth Jolley
  - Miss Peabody's Inheritance
  - Mr Scobie's Riddle
- Peter Kocan — The Cure
- Mudrooroo Nyoongah – Doctor Wooreddy's Prescription for Enduring the Ending of the World
- Kylie Tennant — Tantavallon
- Morris West — The World Is Made of Glass

=== Crime and mystery ===
- Peter Corris — The Empty Beach
- Gabrielle Lord — Tooth and Claw
- Ian Moffitt — The Colour Man

=== Science fiction and fantasy ===
- A. Bertram Chandler — Kelly Country
- Greg Egan — An Unusual Angle
- Lee Harding — Waiting for the End of the World
- George Turner — Yesterday's Men

=== Short story collections ===
- Beverley Farmer — Milk
- Elizabeth Jolley — Woman in a Lampshade
- David Malouf — Antipodes

=== Children's and young adult fiction ===
- Pamela Allen — Bertie and the Bear
- Mem Fox — Possum Magic
- Patricia Wrightson — A Little Fear

=== Poetry ===
- Geoffrey Lehmann & Robert Gray – The Younger Australian Poets (edited)
- Les Murray
  - "Flowering Eucalypt in Autumn"
  - The People's Otherworld : Poems
  - "The Quality of Sprawl"

=== Drama ===
- Stephen Sewell — The Blind Giant is Dancing

=== Non-fiction ===
- Russell Braddon
  - Japan Against the World
  - The Other Hundred Years War
- Mary Durack — Sons in the Saddle
- Sylvia Lawson — The Archibald Paradox
- Megan McMurchy, Margot Oliver and Jeni Thornley — For Love or Money, a Pictorial History of Women and Work in Australia
- Lilith Norman — The brown and yellow: Sydney Girls' High School 1883–1983
- Cyril Pearl — The Dunera Scandal: Deported by Mistake
- Lloyd Robson — A History of Tasmania (Volume 1)
- Anne Summers — Gamble for Power: How Bob Hawke beat Malcolm Fraser: The 1983 federal election

== Awards and honours ==
=== Member of the Order of Australia (AM) ===
- Joyce Nicholson, for "service to literature and the book publishing industry"
- Lu Rees, for "service to children's literature and the community"

=== Lifetime achievement ===
Award	Author
Christopher Brennan Award	Bruce Dawe
Patrick White Award	Marjorie Barnard

=== Literary awards ===
Award	Author	Title	Publisher
The Age Book of the Year Award	Elizabeth Jolley	Mr Scobie's Riddle	Penguin
ALS Gold Medal	David Malouf	Child's Play; Fly Away Peter	Penguin
Colin Roderick Award	Dudley McCarthy	Gallipoli to the Somme — The Story of C.E.W. Bean	John Ferguson

=== Fiction ===
Award	Author	Title	Publisher
The Age Book of the Year Award	Elizabeth Jolley	Mr Scobie's Riddle	Penguin
The Australian/Vogel Literary Award	Jenny Summerville	Shields of Trell	Allen and Unwin
Miles Franklin Award	No award		
New South Wales Premier's Literary Awards	Peter Kocan	The Cure	Angus & Robertson
Western Australian Premier's Book Awards	Elizabeth Jolley	Mr Scobie's Riddle	Penguin Books

=== Children and Young Adult ===
Award	Category	Author	Title	Publisher
Children's Book of the Year Award	Older Readers	Victor Kelleher	Master of the Grove	Penguin Books
Children's Book of the Year Award	Picture Book	Pamela Allen	Who Sank the Boat?	Nelson Books
New South Wales Premier's Literary Awards	Children's Book Award	Pamela Allen	Who Sank the Boat?	Nelson Books
New South Wales Premier's Literary Awards	Special Children's Book Award	Nadia Wheatley	Five Times Dizzy	Oxford University Press

=== Science fiction and fantasy ===
Award	Category	Author	Title	Publisher
Australian SF Achievement Award	Best Australian Science Fiction	Terry Dowling	"The Man Who Walks Away Behind the Eyes"	Omega, May 1982

=== Poetry ===
Award	Author	Title	Publisher
Anne Elder Award	David Brooks	The Cold Front	Hale and Iremonger
Grace Leven Prize for Poetry	Peter Porter	Collected Poems	Oxford University Press
New South Wales Premier's Literary Awards	Vivian Smith	Tide Country	Angus & Robertson

=== Drama ===
Award	Author	Title	Publisher
New South Wales Premier's Literary Awards — Play	Nicholas Enright and Terence Clarke	Variations	Manuscript

=== Non-fiction ===
Award	Author	Title	Publisher
The Age Book of the Year Award	L. L. Robson	A History of Tasmania : Volume 1. : Van Dieman's Land from the Earliest Times to 1855	Oxford University Press
New South Wales Premier's Literary Awards	Blanche d'Alpuget	Robert J. Hawke	Schwartz Books

== Births ==
A list, ordered by date of birth (and, if the date is either unspecified or repeated, ordered alphabetically by surname) of births in 1983 of Australian literary figures, authors of written works or literature-related individuals follows, including year of death.

- 2 December — Tara June Winch, writer of Aboriginal and European descent

== Deaths ==
A list, ordered by date of death (and, if the date is either unspecified or repeated, ordered alphabetically by surname) of deaths in 1983 of Australian literary figures, authors of written works or literature-related individuals follows, including year of birth.

- 20 January — Maie Casey, Baroness Casey, pioneer aviator, poet, librettist, biographer, memoirist and artist (born 1891)
- 23 January — Lu Rees, bookseller, book collector and children's literature advocate (born 1901)
- 8 February – Colin Simpson, journalist and travel writer (born 1908)
- 31 March — Christina Stead, novelist and short-story writer (born 1902)
- 25 August — Donald Stuart, novelist whose works include stories with Aboriginal backgrounds and a series recounting his experience as a prisoner of war in Burma in World War II (born 1913)
- 29 September — Alan Moorehead, war correspondent and author of popular histories (born 1910)
- 5 December — Gavin Greenlees, poet (born 1930)

== See also ==
- 1983 in Australia
- 1983 in literature
- 1983 in poetry
- List of years in literature
- List of years in Australian literature
