= The Well (novel) =

1986 novel written by Elizabeth Jolley

- First edition
- Author: Elizabeth Jolley
- Language: English
- Genre: Novel
- Publisher: Viking Press, Australia
- Publication date: 1986
- Publication place: Australia, England
- Media type: Paperback
- Pages: 176
- ISBN: 0-670-81103-3
- OCLC: 14407342
- Dewey Decimal: 823 19
- LC Class: PR9619.3.J68 W45 1986
- Preceded by: Foxybaby
- Followed by: The Sugar Mother

The Well is a Miles Franklin Award-winning 1986 novel by Australian-English author Elizabeth Jolley.

== Synopsis ==
The novel tells the story of two women, Hester and her young ward Katherine, and their relationship with one another. Hester, who has lived alone on a farm with her father for many years, is possessive of the much younger Katherine. The relationship between the two women becomes strained after an incident where Katherine hits a mysterious creature with the roo bar on their four-wheel drive. It is left unclear whether the creature is an animal or an intruder who has stolen a large sum of money from the house. When Katherine begins to hear voices from the well and becomes racked with guilt, Hester goes to extreme measures to maintain her influence over her young ward.

== Awards ==
The novel won the Miles Franklin Literary Award and the FAW Barbara Ramsden Award for the Book of the Year in 1986.

== Critical reception ==
Drusilla Modjeska said in The Sydney Morning Herald, "Jolley's characteristic wit and humour is here but it doesn't dominate. It comes as flashes in a more sombre novel which shares the gothic undertones of her prize-winning Milk and Honey. It is her best yet."

The Times and Democrat said, "This novel demonstrates once again that Elizabeth Jolley is a writer of wit, high moral purpose and great conviction." The Edmonton Journal noted, "with wry humour, Jolley explores compassionately the effects of loneliness and isolation."

== HSC text ==
The Well was a Higher School Certificate text in New South Wales in the 90s. The Call to Australia Party sought to have it removed on the basis it "encourages occult activities, illicit activities, lesbian relationships, self-centred indulgence."

== Film adaptation ==
In 1997, a film of the same name was adapted from this novel. The film was directed by Samantha Lang, from a screenplay by Laura Jones and featured Pamela Rabe and Miranda Otto.

== See also ==
- "Sexual Gothic: Marian Engel's Bear and Elizabeth Jolley's The Well"
- 1986 in Australian literature
- Middlemiss.org
