= Mr Scobie's Riddle =

1983 novel by Australian writer Elizabeth Jolley

- Author: Elizabeth Jolley
- Language: English
- Genre: Fiction
- Publisher: Penguin Books
- Publication date: 1983
- Publication place: Australia
- Media type: Print
- Pages: 226 pp.
- ISBN: 014006656X
- Preceded by: Miss Peabody's Inheritance
- Followed by: Milk and Honey

Mr Scobie's Riddle (1983) is a novel by Australian writer Elizabeth Jolley. It was originally published by Penguin Books in Australia in 1983.

== Synopsis ==
Mr Scobie is admitted to a nursing home which is ruled over by the domineering Matron Hyacinth Price.

== Critical reception ==
Writing in The Canberra Times Lyn Frost noted that the novel "is a much looked-for new novel by one of Australia's most original authors. Once more she has turned her attention to the elderly...Wry, moving humour."

Lucy Frost reviewed the novel for The Australian Book Review and stated: "Jolley’s compassion for the people who ordinarily slide by without attention has always given her fiction a special kind of gentleness...It is the edge created by comedy when the distorted in life evokes laughter rather than tears. The cumulative effect of the laughter in situations which are not intrinsically funny is to create a sense of unease in the reader. The distortions are funny, but they are also distortions and as such threaten to become sinister."

== Publication history ==
After its original publication in 1983 in Australia by publisher Penguin Books the novel was later published as follows:

- Penguin Books, Australia, 1985 and 2010
- Persea Books, USA, 2012

The novel was also translated into Italian in 2014.

== Awards ==
The novel won the Age Book of the Year Imaginative Writing Prize in 1983.

== See also ==
- 1983 in Australian literature
