= Samantha Lang =

Australian film director

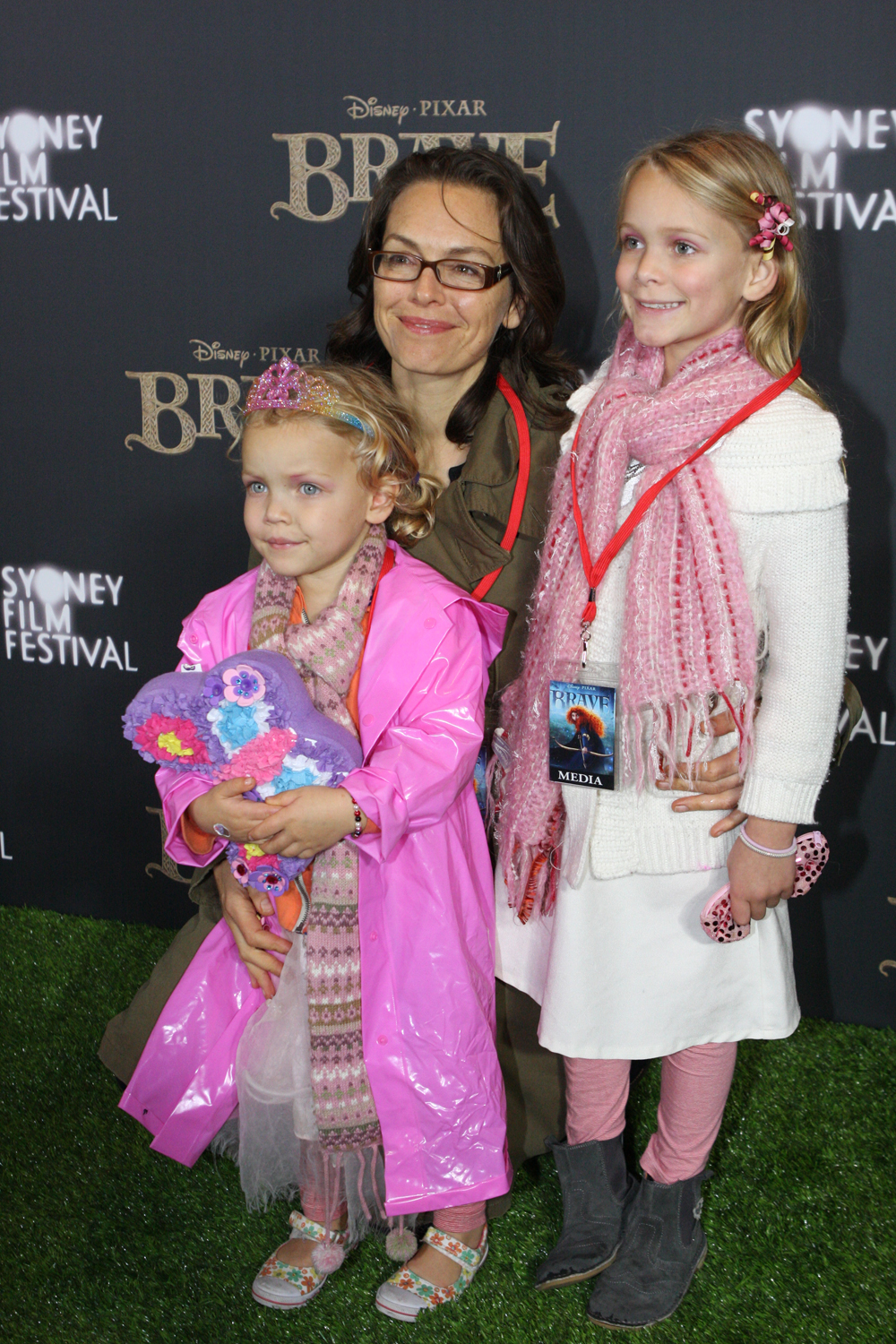
- Lang at the Australian premiere of Brave, 2012
- Born: London, England
- Education: North Sydney Girls' High School (1985); Universite de Grenoble, France (1986); Fachhochschule Wiesbaden, Germany (1989); FAMU, Prague; University of Technology Sydney (1990); AFTRS (1995); University of Technology Sydney (2022)
- Occupations: Film director Screenwriter
- Years active: 1993-present
- Notable work: The Well (1997); The Monkey's Mask (2000); Carlotta (2014)
- Spouse: Jeremy Sims (m.2004–div.2011)
- Children: 2

Samantha Lang is an Australian film director and screenwriter. Her production company is Handmaid Media.

== Early life and education ==
Samantha Lang was born in London, England, migrating to Australia with her family at the age of 14. She attended North Sydney Girls' High School, earning her HSC in 1985.

She grew up watching European films, and was very influenced by the film Hiroshima Mon Amour.

In 1986, she spent a year at Universite de Grenoble, at Grenoble in France, studying French literature and linguistics.

After beginning her university studies in 1987, in 1989 Lang was awarded a scholarship from Qantas to study at the Fachhochschule Wiesbaden in Germany for 10 months, where she focused on film and photography. She also attended FAMU, the Czech film school in Prague, which she said was a "life-changing experience" for her. The government had been overthrown, as Vaclev Havel was coming to power, and young people who had previously been barred from attending university because of their parents' political leanings had just entered film school. In 1990 she graduated with a Bachelor of Design (Hons) in Visual Communications from University of Technology Sydney.

Lang graduated, in directing, from the Australian Film, Television and Radio School (AFTRS) in 1995.

She is fluent in French and German.

== Career ==
Lang's graduate short film, Audacious (1995), earned her some recognition and won an award at the Sydney Film Festival. She directed an episode in Twisted Tales, a mystery drama TV series narrated by Bryan Brown, in 1996.

Early in her career, Lang worked for advertising firm Cherub Pictures, directing television commercials. In the 1990s she did some stills photography and made some short films.

Lang's first feature film The Well, an adaptation of the novel by Elizabeth Jolley written by Laura Jones, produced by Sandra Levy and starring Miranda Otto and Pamela Rabe, was selected for 30 film festivals, including Sundance Film Festival, and was entered into competition for the Palme d'Or in the 1997 Cannes Film Festival.

The Monkey's Mask, her second film, is an international co-production 2000 thriller. It stars Susie Porter, Abbie Cornish, and Kelly McGillis. Porter plays a lesbian private detective who falls in love with a suspect (McGillis) in the disappearance of a young woman. The film is based on the 1994 verse novel of the same name by Australian poet Dorothy Porter.

L'idole (2002) was a French-language film, which starred Leelee Sobieski and James Hong. It was screened at the Edinburgh Film Festival; World of Women (WOW) Film Festival in Sydney; Toronto International Film Festival and Montreal World Film Festival in Canada; and in France, the Locarno Film Festival, Bordeaux International Festival of Women in Cinema and the Antipodean Film Festival in Saint Tropez.

In 2017, Lang directed her first VR film, Prehistoric VR. that is installed at Australian Centre for Moving Image (ACMI)

Brown Lake (2021) is an artist moving image work of "eco-cinema", narrated by Mia Wasikowska, that has been exhibited at Asia Pacific Triennale (2002) at GOMA, ACMI (2021) and other galleries and screening events.

Lang has in development an adaptation of the stage comedy Kill The Messenger by Nakkiah Lui.

A six-part TV drama series, Night Games, based on the book by Anna Krien, is in development.

In April 2022, Screen Australia announced funding for Immersion, a science fiction drama TV series to be directed by Garth Davis (Lion), written by Matt Vesely (Aftertaste) and executive produced by Emile Sherman (The King's Speech) and Lang.

=== Production companies ===
Lang's production company is called Handmaid Media.

Since 2019 and as of 2022, Lang is collaborating with Garth Davis, Emile Sherman and Iain Canning in a new production company called I AM THAT, as an executive producer and head of development.

== Other roles and activities ==
Lang was Head of Directing at AFTRS from 2010 to 2016, where she has mentored, supervised and lectured postgraduate film students. She has also mentored emerging filmmakers through Screen NSW, the HIVE Fund at Adelaide Film Festival, and Screen Australia.

She was elected as President of the Australian Directors' Guild (ADG) in 2015, relinquishing the role in December 2021 after serving for 12 years on the board in total. Under her leadership, there was huge growth in the number and diversity of members, and during this time she was one of the founding members of Screen Australia's Gender Matters program. She was passionate about encouraging more diverse directors, wanting to "broaden and support directors across a greater breadth and depth, industrially, professionally and culturally".

As of 2022, Lang submitted her thesis for a Doctor of Philosophy (Communications) in Posthuman Screen Poetics at University of Technology Sydney.

== Filmography ==
=== Film ===
Year	Title	Role	Notes
1993	God's Bones	Director / Writer	Short film
1995	Out	Director	Short film
1995	Audacious	Director / Writer	Short film
1996	Floating Life	Director's assistant	Feature film
1997	The Well	Director	Feature film
2000	The Monkey's Mask	Director	Feature film
2002	L'idole	Director / Writer	Feature film
2014	Stuffed	Mentor	Short film
2016	Emo the Musical	Director's mentor	Feature film
2017	Prehistoric VR	Director	VR film
2018	Tip of My Tongue	Director's mentor	Short film
2019	It All Started with a Stale Sandwich	Director / Writer	Documentary film
2021	Brown Lake	Director	Eco-cinema

=== Television ===
Year	Title	Role	Notes
1996	Twisted Tales	Director	1 episode
2009	All Saints	Director	1 episode
2009–2011	My Place	Director	5 episodes
2013	Packed to the Rafters	Director	2 episodes
2014	The Killing Field	Director	TV movie
2014	Carlotta	Director	TV movie
TBA	Kill the Messenger		
TBA	Night Games		Miniseries (In development)
TBA	Immersion		TV series

== Awards ==
Lang's films have won many awards, including at the Australian Film Institute Awards and the Sydney Film Festival. Carlotta (2014) won three of the five AACTA Awards in the categories in which it was nominated.

== Personal life ==
Lang married Australian actor and director Jeremy Sims in 2004, with whom she had two daughters, Frederique and Evelyn. They were divorced in 2011.

== See also ==
- List of female film and television directors
- List of LGBT-related films directed by women
