= Laura Jones (screenwriter) =

Australian screenwriter (born 1951)

- Born: 1951 (age 74–75); Australia
- Occupation: Screenwriter

Laura Jones (born 1951) is an Australian screenwriter.

Jones started her career writing teleplays for the Australian Broadcasting Corporation. Her first feature film credit was the original screenplay for High Tide (1987), directed by Gillian Armstrong and starring Judy Davis. This was followed by her adaptation of the Janet Frame autobiography, An Angel at My Table (1990), which was directed by Jane Campion. She collaborated again with Campion, this time on The Portrait of a Lady (1996). The following years saw her team up with Armstrong on Oscar and Lucinda, adapted from the novel by Australian writer Peter Carey. She also worked on other literary adaptations for Hollywood.

Jones is a strong supporter of Australian filmmaking. During the 1990s she served on the Australian Film Commission.

She is the daughter of Australian author Jessica Anderson.

== Career ==
Laura Jones spent the beginning of her adult life doing odd jobs. During the mid- 70s she was living in Canberra with her husband and daughter, who took up most of her time. In her mid-twenties she bought her first TV and after watching many shows she thought that writing for TV “would be a way of making money without going to work”. Jones’ screenwriting career began after she sent a play to Australian screenwriter Tony Morphett. Morphett got Jones her first screenwriting job for the Australian Broadcasting Corporation’s Certain Women series in 1975. Jones continued to work in television for a time and she that: "you learn a great deal writing for soaps".

Jones' career in film began with her original screenplay for High Tide in 1987 that was directed by Gillian Armstrong and “garnered high praise”. Following her success, Jane Campion hired Jones for a television miniseries that turned into the film An Angel at My Table, an adaptation of Janet Frame's autobiography. After this, Jones' career turned into adaptation after adaptation. Her films are generally about women and feature strong female characters, and she is now considered one of the world’s best movie adapters.

Jones has never been interested in being a director, however in interviews Jones has stated how closely she likes to work with directors, and how strongly she believes in the importance of having the writer on the set. She sees the importance of working with directors who share her passion, for example she has a "strong commitment to collaborative working with female directors, notably Jane Campion and Gillian Armstrong". She was especially fortunate in her film High Tide, as Armstrong and Sandra Levy (the film's producer) continued to let her take part in the film during production. Jones states that Armstrong and Levy "regarded me as very much part of the process and when some minutes had to be cut out, I was asked about it".

In 1997 she wrote the screenplay for Samantha Lang's first feature film The Well, an adaptation of the novel by Elizabeth Jolley. Produced by Sandra Levy and starring Miranda Otto and Pamela Rabe, the film was selected for 30 film festivals, including Sundance Film Festival, and was entered into competition for the Palme d'Or in the 1997 Cannes Film Festival.

Jones served on the Australian Film Commission during the 1990s and has been "very active in encouraging women's (and alternative) women's cinema".

== Awards ==
Laura Jones has won the Australian Writer’s Guild Award three times, the New South Wales Premier’s Prize for Screen Writing twice, and the Australian Film Institute’s Byron Kennedy Award in 1997.

== Filmography ==
Year	Title	Role	Adapted
2007	Brick Lane	Screenplay	Yes
2002	Possession	Screenplay	Yes
1999	Angela's Ashes	Screenplay	Yes
1997	Oscar and Lucinda	Screenplay	Yes
1997	A Thousand Acres	Screenplay	Yes
1997	The Well	Screenplay	Yes
1996	The Portrait of a Lady	Screenplay	Yes
1990	An Angel at My Table	Screenplay	Yes
1987	High Tide	Writer	Original

== Television series ==
Year	Title	Role
1997	Say You Want Me	Writer
1981	The Bush Gang	Writer
1980	Spring and Fall	Writer
1979	Patrol Boat	Writer
1979	The Oracle	Writer
1978	Cass	Writer
1976	Clean Straw for Nothing	Writer
1973	Certain Women	Writer

== Plays ==
Year	Title	Role
1986	Every Man for Himself	Writer
1985	Cold Comfort	Writer
