= The Cure (Kocan novel) =

1983 novel by Australian writer Peter Kocan

- Author: Peter Kocan
- Language: English
- Genre: Fiction
- Publisher: Angus & Robertson
- Publication date: 1983
- Publication place: Australia
- Media type: Print
- Pages: 137 pp.
- ISBN: 020714589X
- Preceded by: The Treatment
- Followed by: Flies of a Summer

The Cure (1983) is a novel by Australian writer Peter Kocan. It was originally published by Angus and Robertson in Australia in 1983.

The novel is a direct sequel to the author's previous book The Treatment.

== Synopsis ==
Still in the same mental hospital as the author's previous novel, Len Tarbutt is given more freedom and occupational therapy. He uses his writing as a means of maintaining his sanity and finally wins a poetry prize.

== Critical reception ==
Peter Kay, writing in The Canberra Times, stated: "Peter Kocan's The Cure is a moving, chilling and distinctly memorable novel. While the themes he explores are profound, Kocan's prose is spare and direct. He is a skilful builder of tension and he handles his characters with superb sensitivity...Kocan's use of humour, to both temper and accentuate the horrors of mental hospital life, adds greatly to the impact of this impressive and disturbing book."

== Publication history ==
After its original publication in 1983 in Australia by publisher Angus and Robertson the novel was later collected with the author's previous novel, The Treatment, and republished as follows:

- Sirius Books, Australia, 1984
- Taplinger Publishing, USA, 1985
- Angus and Robertson, Australia, 1993 and 2004
- HarperCollins, Australia, 2002
- Europa Editions, USA, 2008

== Awards ==
- New South Wales Premier's Literary Awards – Christina Stead Prize, 1983, winner

== See also ==
- 1983 in Australian literature
