= Kelly Country =

1983 novel by Australian author A. Bertram Chandler

- Author: A. Bertram Chandler
- Language: English
- Genre: Alternative history novel
- Publisher: Penguin
- Publication date: 1983
- Publication place: Australia
- Media type: Print
- Pages: 341 pp.
- ISBN: 0140060049

Kelly Country is a 1983 alternative history novel by the Australian author A. Bertram Chandler.

== Synopsis ==
Australian bushranger and rebel Ned Kelly leads a successful revolution against British colonial rule. The result is that Australia becomes a world power, but the Australian Republic which Kelly founded degenerates into a hereditary dictatorship.

== Critical reception ==
Writing in Australian Book Review critic Yvonne Rousseau concluded: "Chandler has thoroughly researched the political and military possibilities of the period; he has dealt with misgivings as to whether Kelly had the drive to establish a dynasty of Hereditary Presidents, each one respectfully spoken of as 'the Kelly'; he has provided astonishing adventures, constant shifts of scene, and a final revelation which casts an ironic light on history–which highlights an uncertainty very few men can be immune to–and which paradoxically shows the final Kelly (the one who wiped out Hanoi with nuclear weapons) to be a greater-hearted man than the reader has believed."

Van Ikin, in Westerly found that "The novel cannot help but raise certain questions about Australian history and nationalism, yet these intellectual issues are not tackled with the same zest and imagination that the author applies to scenes of battIe or reconstructions of historical spectacle. This imbalance, however, is quite deliberate: it is clear that Chandler has set out to write a rollickingly readable yarn, peppered with suspense, excitement, and enthusiastic humour. Moreover it is to his credit that he ensures that certain key questions are at least asked (if not answered)."

== Publishing history ==
After the novel's initial publication in Australia by Penguin in 1983, it was reprinted as follows:

- DAW, USA, 1985
- Orion, UK, 2016

The novel was also translated into German in 1986, with the alternate title Die Australische Revolution.

== Awards ==
- Ditmar Award, 1984, shortlisted

== See also ==
- 1983 in Australian literature
