= Attempted assassination of Arthur Calwell =

Attempted Assassination of Arthur Calwell
- Location: Mosman Town Hall, Sydney, Australia
- Date: 21 June 1966
- Target: Arthur Calwell
- Attack type: assassination attempt
- Weapon: .22 rifle
- Victim: Arthur Calwell (survived)
- Perpetrator: Peter Kocan

On 21 June 1966, an assassination attempt was made on Arthur Calwell, then leader of the Australian Labor Party.

== Assassination attempt ==
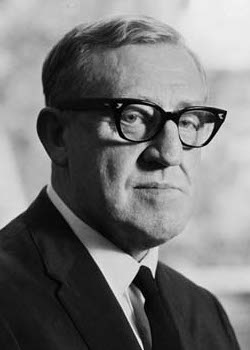
Arthur Calwell in 1966

On the evening of 21 June 1966, while campaigning for the 1966 federal election, Arthur Calwell addressed an anti-conscription rally at Mosman Town Hall in Sydney. Senator Douglas McClelland described the meeting as "quite a rowdy one", although Calwell himself stated it was "without incident".

Peter Kocan, a 19-year-old factory worker, stood waiting in the town hall's lobby. At some point he left to retrieve a sawn-off .22 calibre rifle that he had hidden on the grounds of a nearby Methodist church; he concealed it under his overcoat. He later told police that he had sawn off the barrel and stock the night before, as it was too big to fit under his coat. The meeting concluded at about 10:45 p.m., after which Calwell walked to the waiting Commonwealth car to be driven back to his hotel. He sat in the front passenger seat next to the driver Frederick Smith. Calwell usually travelled with his car window open, but it was closed when Kocan shot at him from point-blank range. According to Calwell, "there was an exploding sound coming from my left and the glass in the front nearside window shattered and I felt a stinging sensation to the front of my face in the vicinity of my chin". The bullet shattered the window before coming to rest in the left lapel of Calwell's coat. He received a number of wounds to his face from the shattered glass and bullet fragments, and his shirt was "badly blood-stained".

Calwell re-entered the town hall briefly to telephone his wife, and was then driven to Royal North Shore Hospital where he spent the night. He was released the following evening. Kocan attempted to flee, but was restrained by members of the crowd, including Bob Gould, Barry Robinson, and Wayne Haylen (son of Les Haylen).

The police said Kocan told them after his arrest:

Unless I did something out of the ordinary I realised I would remain a nobody all my life. I came to the conclusion that however hard it was I would have to do something that would set me apart from other nobodies. I would not have done anything so cruel as shoot someone if I had any alternative. That's why I shot Mr Calwell. I'm sorry I caused pain to Mr Calwell... I went there with that intention [to shoot him] and when I fired a shot I didn't care if I hit him or not. I just wanted to get it over with... When I read an advertisement in the paper last Saturday about the meeting... [The rifle was ...] too bulky. If I was going to assassinate anyone like Mr Kennedy from a window it would have been all right, but it was too bulky to conceal under any clothing... I stood in the lobby of the town hall. I just waited for Mr Calwell to come out, and he came out and talked to various people, and then he went towards his car talking to other people. He got into his car; time was running out. I had the gun in my belt under my coat. I drew the gun, walked up to the window and fired in the general direction of the window. I didn't expect to get away, and I did not intend to run, but when it happened, I decided to run away as a reflex action... I did not intend to shoot Mr Calwell at first. I wanted to assassinate some public figure. I did not agree with Mr Calwell's politics and that made it easier to choose him.

Kocan later reflected, "the shooting logic was in the air at the time", pointing to the assassinations of Ngô Đình Diệm, John F. Kennedy, Hendrik Verwoerd and Malcolm X. "Unfortunately, we are creatures who pick up on what's around", he said. "If it had been a different era, my actions may have been different... Insofar as I had any thoughts about what would happen after the shooting, I assumed I'd be cut down in a hail of bullets."

== Sentencing ==
Kocan was found guilty of attempted murder and sentenced to life imprisonment. The presiding judge Leslie Herron ruled that:

It is necessary for me to pass such a sentence to deter any other person from even considering an attempt upon the life and safety of our public men... You have pleaded guilty to one of the most serious crimes in the criminal calendar and the plain fact must be faced that on June 21 at Mosman Town Hall a bullet fired by you lodged in the lapel of Mr Calwell's coat and portion of it, with shattered glass, stuck in his chin. This public figure had a close call — his life I believe hung by a thread. Indeed, it seems that only by the intervention of Providence he is still alive... All these preparations and your intent was to kill a public figure who was innocent of any offence against you except that you differed from his political views. I regret to say your previous good character must be set aside on this occasion because it must be out weighed. I think, by the gravity of the offence. I am satisfied your motive was to acquire notoriety or as you thought, the fame perhaps of assassinating a public figure. In this you were, I am absolutely satisfied, influenced by the publicity attending the assassination of President Kennedy. But community in Australia does not want the introduction of such criminal acts here. Public men in Australia must be free to go about their important affairs of State without fear of danger to life or limb. I must see that the law protects them to its utmost.

The sentence was upheld on appeal.

Kocan was initially jailed at Sydney's Long Bay Gaol before being transferred to Morriset Psychiatric Hospital for the criminally insane, where he began to study literature, philosophy and history, and to write poetry. Kocan was released after ten years in August 1976.

Calwell visited Kocan at Morriset, and wrote a letter to Kocan forgiving him for the act. The attempted assassination was the third assassination attempt in Australian political history following Henry James O'Farrell's attempt on the life of Prince Alfred in 1868 and the assassination of NSW Legislative Assembly Member Percival Brookfield in South Australia in 1921, though Thomas Ley, who died while imprisoned at Broadmoor Asylum for murder, was suspected of killing four political opponents in the 1920s.

== Sources ==
- Kiernan, Colm (1978). Calwell: A Personal and Political Biography. Thomas Nelson. ISBN 0170051854.
