= The Well (1997 film) =

- DVD cover
- Directed by: Samantha Lang
- Written by: Elizabeth Jolley (novel); Laura Jones
- Starring: Pamela Rabe; Miranda Otto; Paul Chubb; Frank Wilson
- Cinematography: Mandy Walker
- Edited by: Dany Cooper
- Release date: 31 July 1997
- Running time: 101 minutes
- Country: Australia
- Language: English
- Budget: $3 million

The Well is a 1997 Australian film directed by Samantha Lang and starring Pamela Rabe, Miranda Otto, Paul Chubb, and Frank Wilson. It is based on the 1986 novel of the same name by Elizabeth Jolley.

== Synopsis ==
A young girl named Katherine and her older friend Hester live on an isolated farm run by Hester and her father Francis. Katherine works as a maid and wants to leave because there's too much work. Hester, however, becomes attracted to Katherine and holds her there, promising to give her less work in the future. When Francis dies, Hester decides to sell the farm for cash. They move to small cottage on the edge of the farm and plan to go to Europe. But a tragic accident and the theft of their money change their plans.

== Cast ==
- Pamela Rabe as Hester
- Miranda Otto as Katherine
- Paul Chubb as Harry Bird
- Frank Wilson as Francis Harper
- Steve Jacobs as Rod Bordern
- Geneviève Lemon as Jen Bordern
- Simon Lyndon as Abel
- Kati Edwards as Molly
- Luke Harrison as Bordern Child
- Daniel Harrison as Bordern Child
- Jennifer Kent as Marg Trinder
- Stephen Rae as Murray Trinder
- Cameron Shanahan as Bordern Child
- Miles Shanahan as Bordern Child
- Paul Caesar as Jock
- Annalise Lise as Lover
- Jamie McLeod as Hitchhiker

== Production ==
Sandra Levy bought the rights to the novel and hired Laura Jones to adapt. They worked on the project for around six years, and then Samantha Lang became involved as director.

== Awards ==
- In 1997, it won three AFI Awards presented by the Australian Film Institute: Best Achievement in Production Design - Michael Philips, Best Performance by an Actress in a Leading Role - Pamela Rabe and Best Screenplay Adapted from Another Source - Laura Jones.
- In 1997, it was nominated for eight AFI awards: Best Achievement in Cinematography - Mandy Walker, Best Achievement in Costume Design - Anna Borghesi, Best Achievement in Direction - Samantha Lang, Best Achievement in Editing - Dany Cooper, Best Achievement in Sound - Anne Breslin, Gethin Creagh, Bronwyn Murphy, Best Film - Sandra Levy, Best Original Music Score - Stephen Rae, Best Performance by an Actress in a Leading Role - Miranda Otto.
- In 1997, it was nominated for the Golden Palm award at the Cannes Film Festival
- In 1997, Pamela Rabe received best actress at the Stockholm International Film Festival.
- In 1998, it won the FCCA award presented by the Film Critics Circle of Australia Awards: Best Screenplay - Adapted - Laura Jones
- In 1998, it was nominated for three FCCA awards: Best Actor (Female) - Miranda Otto, Best Actor (Female) - Pamela Rabe and Best Cinematography - Mandy Walker

== Box office ==
The Well grossed $393,920 at the box office in Australia.

== Reception ==
On the review aggregator website Rotten Tomatoes, 56% of 9 critics' reviews are positive. Metacritic, which uses a weighted average, assigned the film a score of 67 out of 100, based on 4 critics, indicating "generally favorable" reviews.

Writer Bob Ellis later called it:

That glummest of hybrids a flawless abomination. Nothing in it is wrong, the acting is superb, and its Look — Ingmar Bergman 1967 I'd put it, portentous, exquisite, mesmeric, confronting and pointless as Piss Christ — is beyond all carping and cavil. But it wants to be a 28-minute student film (two characters, a single setting, a mystery, a punchline) and that’s what it should be. But it’s a big arrogant feature film instead, about forty-two hours long, a mountainside Piano bristling with dog-eared Freudian symbols and bereft of actual drama, blue-filtered throughout in honour, perhaps; of Blue Hills, which was also set in Cooma, and audiences are already hurling themselves out of aeroplanes over the Himalayas to be free of it; and I know by Christ how they feel.

== See also ==
- Cinema of Australia
