= High Tide (1987 film) =

- Movie poster
- Directed by: Gillian Armstrong
- Written by: Laura Jones
- Produced by: Sandra Levy
- Starring: Judy Davis; Jan Adele; Claudia Karvan; Colin Friels
- Cinematography: Russell Boyd
- Edited by: Nicholas Beauman
- Music by: Peter Best
- Production companies: Hemdale Film Corporation; FGH; SJL Productions
- Distributed by: Filmpac Holdings
- Release date: July 30, 1987
- Running time: 104 minutes
- Country: Australia
- Language: English
- Budget: A$3.75 million
- Box office: A$206,185

High Tide is a 1987 Australian drama film starring Judy Davis, from a script by Laura Jones, about the mother-daughter bond, directed by Gillian Armstrong. Armstrong reported that when she began work on High Tide she pinned a note above her desk: "Blood ties. Water. Running Away." Jan Adele plays Lilli's mother-in-law Bet, in her film debut.

== Plot ==
Lilli is one of three backing singers for a touring Elvis impersonator until she is fired. Then, sacked at the beginning of winter she is stranded due to a defective car in a ramshackle beach town on the windswept coast of New South Wales. This remote working class tourist town has a pervasive sense of rootlessness. The people have seasonal jobs and work hard in small businesses.

Here, stuck in the Mermaid Caravan Park, she encounters her teenage daughter Ally. When Lilli's young surfer husband died, she felt lost; she gave up her baby to her mother-in-law, Bet. Lilli has been drifting ever since, and getting wasted. Bet is a rowdy, belligerent woman, devoted to Ally—she has taken care of her for 13 years but has no idea how unhappy the girl is.

Lilli has an immediate rapport with the lonely Ally even before she knows that she is her daughter, and after she knows, cannot take her eyes off her. They belong together, but Lilli's terrified of taking on the responsibilities of motherhood, and Bet tells her she is riff-raff. When Ally is first seen, she is in the water; surfing is "her refuge from the noisy junkiness of life with Bet. Bet isn't a monster, she's simply the wrong person to be raising the pensive Ally, who is an introvert, like her mother. The drama is in our feeling that Lilli must not leave her daughter in the embrace of this raucous old trouper."

== Cast ==
- Judy Davis as Lilli
- Jan Adele as Bet
- Claudia Karvan as Ally
- Frankie J. Holden as Lester
- John Clayton as Col
- Colin Friels as Mick
- Toni Scanlan as Mary
- Monica Trapaga as Tracey
- Mark Hembrow as Mechanic
- Barry Rugless as Club manager
- Bob Purtell as Joe
- Rob Carlton as Pinball boy

== Production ==
The story was developed by Armstong, Sandra Levy and writer Laura Jones. They wanted to make something contemporary that had a small cast and would be relatively cheap to make.

The script was originally written and financed to be about a man who had abandoned his daughter. But then Armstrong went to see Wrong World at the cinema, which was about a male drifter, and the more she thought about the more she felt there had been plenty of films about a man being reunited with their child such as Paper Moon and Paris Texas. Her husband suggested she change the character to a woman, which would not only be different but give the film a harder edge. Armstrong was reluctant as she did not want to make another film about a woman, but eventually changed her mind. Jones and Levy agreed with the choice.

Judy Davis was approached even before the film was rewritten and she was involved in further drafts.

In 2021, Claudia Karvan recalled,

I was 14 when I got cast in the film High Tide, which starred Judy Davis as my mother. I was just a normal teenager who was, sadly, not watching a lot of Australian productions; I hadn’t seen My Brilliant Career, so I was completely ignorant to who Judy [Davis] was and what sort of reputation she came with. I just took her at face value.

During the entire filming process, I was so enthralled by her I found it painful to be away from her. I just relished her company so much: her stories, her sense of humour. She would confide in me, and she’s really quite addictive to be around. All day on set was just utter pleasure for me, but it was work for her. I remember a moment when they called “Wrap!” and she yelled, “Woo hoo!” and went dancing across the paddock, skipping off set. I just looked at her, horrified, and thought, “How can she be so happy to leave?!” I couldn’t fathom it because I felt so miserable any time I had to part ways with her.

It’s funny, it’s almost like the relationship gets preserved; when I’m around Judy now, more than 30 years later, suddenly I’m that teenager again. I can’t present her a fully formed, mature woman because I just revert to that 14-year-old who’s totally in awe of her.

Karvan also recalled, "Gillian Armstrong was such a unique voice, and to be working with such extraordinary women, and to have Judy Davis play my mum, it was an absolute one off. She was so smart, so available, so funny, so engaging and she set the bar incredibly high."

== Awards ==
In 1987 the film was nominated for seven AFI Awards (Best Film, Best Director, Best Original Screenplay, Best Actress, Best Supporting Actress x 2, Best Sound) and won in the Best Actress in a Lead Role (Judy Davis) and Best Actress in a Supporting Role (Jan Adele) categories. In 1989 Judy Davis won the NSFC Best Actress award for her role.

== Box office ==
High Tide grossed $206,185 at the box office in Australia, which is equivalent to $414,432 in 2009 dollars.

== Reception ==
Writing for The New Yorker, Pauline Kael called the movie a "woman's picture in a new way" in the sense that it "has the technique and the assurance to put a woman's fluid, not fully articulated emotions right onto the screen." She goes on to say that "a great many young women are likely to feel that this is the movie they've wanted to make" and that "the acute and well-written script acknowledges the basic ineffableness of some experiences."

== See also ==
- Cinema of Australia
