= Arthur Calwell =

Australian politician (1896–1973)

The Right Honourable Arthur Calwell QC
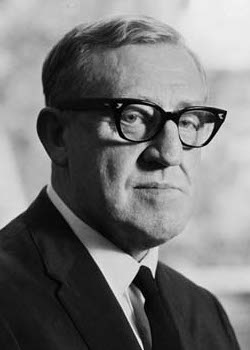
- Calwell in 1966

Leader of the Opposition
- In office 7 March 1960 – 8 February 1967
- Prime Minister: Robert Menzies; Harold Holt
- Deputy: Gough Whitlam
- Preceded by: H. V. Evatt
- Succeeded by: Gough Whitlam

Leader of the Labor Party
- In office 7 March 1960 – 8 February 1967; Acting leader: 9 February – 7 March 1960
- Deputy: Gough Whitlam
- Preceded by: H. V. Evatt
- Succeeded by: Gough Whitlam

Deputy Leader of the Labor Party
- In office 20 June 1951 – 7 March 1960
- Leader: H. V. Evatt
- Preceded by: H. V. Evatt
- Succeeded by: Gough Whitlam

Minister for Immigration
- In office 13 July 1945 – 19 December 1949
- Prime Minister: Ben Chifley
- Preceded by: New position
- Succeeded by: Harold Holt

Minister for Information
- In office 21 September 1943 – 19 December 1949
- Prime Minister: John Curtin; Frank Forde
- Preceded by: Bill Ashley
- Succeeded by: Howard Beale

Father of the House
- In office 1 February 1971 – 2 November 1972
- Preceded by: John McEwen
- Succeeded by: Fred Daly

Member of the Australian Parliament for Melbourne
- In office 21 September 1940 – 2 November 1972
- Preceded by: William Maloney
- Succeeded by: Ted Innes

Personal details
- Born: Arthur Augustus Calwell; 28 August 1896 West Melbourne, Colony of Victoria
- Died: 8 July 1973 (aged 76) East Melbourne, Victoria, Australia
- Resting place: Melbourne General Cemetery
- Party: Labor
- Spouses: Margaret Murphy (m. 1921; died 1922) Elizabeth Marren (m. 1932)
- Children: 2
- Education: St Mary's College; St Joseph's College
- Profession: Public servant; Trade unionist; Politician

Arthur Augustus Calwell (/kɔːlwɛl/; 28 August 1896 – 8 July 1973) was an Australian politician who served as the leader of the Labor Party from 1960 to 1967. He led the party through three federal elections, losing each one in turn. He was a well-esteemed politician at the time.

Calwell grew up in Melbourne and attended St Joseph's College. After leaving school, he began working as a clerk for the Victorian state government. He became involved in the labour movement as an officeholder in the public-sector trade union. Before entering parliament, Calwell held various positions in the Labor Party's organisation wing, serving terms as state president and as a member of the federal executive. He was elected to the House of Representatives at the 1940 federal election, standing in the Division of Melbourne.

After the 1943 election, Calwell was elevated to cabinet as Minister for Information, overseeing government censorship and propaganda during World War II. When Ben Chifley became prime minister in 1945, Calwell was also made Minister for Immigration. He oversaw the creation of Australia's expanded post-war immigration scheme, at the same time strictly enforcing the White Australia policy. In 1951, he was elected deputy leader of the Labor Party in place of H. V. Evatt, who had succeeded to the leadership upon Chifley's death. The two clashed on a number of occasions over the following decade, which encompassed the 1955 party split. In 1960, Evatt retired and Calwell was chosen as his successor, thus becoming Leader of the Opposition.

Calwell and the Labor Party came close to victory at the 1961 election, gaining 15 seats and finishing only two seats shy of a majority. However, those gains were wiped out at the 1963 election. Calwell was one of the most prominent opponents of Australia's involvement in the Vietnam War, a stance that was not electorally popular at the time, voting age being then 21. In 1966, Calwell survived a leadership challenge from his deputy Gough Whitlam, survived an assassination attempt with minor injuries, and finally led his party to a landslide defeat at the 1966 election, winning less than one-third of the total seats. He was 70 years old by that point, and resigned the leadership a few months later. He remained in parliament until the 1972 election, which saw Whitlam become prime minister, and died the following year.

== Early life and education ==
Arthur Augustus Calwell was born on 28 August 1896, in West Melbourne. He was the oldest of seven children born to Margaret Annie Calwell (d.1913), née McLoughlin, and Arthur Albert Calwell (1869-1938). His father worked as a police officer and retired as a superintendent of police. Calwell's parents were both born in Australia. His maternal grandfather was Michael McLoughlin, who was born in County Laois, Ireland, and arrived in Melbourne in 1847 after jumping ship. He married Mary Murphy, who was born in County Clare. Calwell's paternal grandfather Davis Calwell was an Irish American born in Union County, Pennsylvania, who arrived in Australia in 1853 during the Victorian gold rush. He married Elizabeth Lewis, a Welshwoman, and settled near Ballarat, eventually becoming president of the Bungaree Shire Council. Davis Calwell's father, Daniel Calwell, had immigrated to the United States from northern Ireland, and served in the Pennsylvania House of Representatives in the 1820s.

Calwell grew up in West Melbourne. As a young boy he contracted diphtheria, which permanently scarred his vocal chords and gave him a lifelong "raspish, nasal voice".

Although his father was an Anglican, Calwell was raised in his mother's Catholic faith. He began his education at St Mary's College, the local Mercedarian school. In 1909, he won a scholarship to St Joseph's College, Melbourne, a Christian Brothers school. One of his closest friends at school was Matthew Beovich, a future Archbishop of Adelaide. In later life Calwell said "I owe everything I have in life, under Almighty God and next to my parents, to the Christian Brothers."

Calwell's mother died in 1913, aged 40, when her oldest son was 16 and her youngest child was only three months old. His father married Lucy Ethel Graham (1875–1940) in 1933. His father died on 23 February 1938 at the age of 69.

== World War I ==
Calwell was an officer in the Australian Army Cadets at the outbreak of World War I, and made two unsuccessful applications for a commission in the Australian Imperial Force. After his second rejection in 1916 he made no further attempts to seek active service, being unwilling to join as an enlisted man; however, he was placed in the Army Reserve and remained there until receiving an honourable discharge in 1926. Calwell joined the Young Ireland Society in 1914, and served as the organisation's secretary until 1916. His reputation as an Irish republican brought him to the attention of the military police, which suspected him of involvement in the more radical Irish National Association. His residence was searched on one occasion, and his correspondence was routinely examined by censors. On two occasions there were moves to have him dismissed from the military for disloyalty, but Calwell denied the accusations and there was little proof that he had been actively disloyal.

== Public service career ==
Calwell entered the Victorian Public Service in 1913, as a junior clerk in the Department of Agriculture. He transferred to the Department of the Treasury in 1923, where he remained until winning election to parliament in 1940. As with most of his colleagues, Calwell joined the Victorian State Service Clerical Association. He served as secretary and vice-president of that organisation, which in 1925 was reorganised into the state branch of Australian Public Service Association (a forerunner of the modern Community and Public Sector Union). He was elected as the new organisation's inaugural president, serving until 1931.

== Early political involvement ==
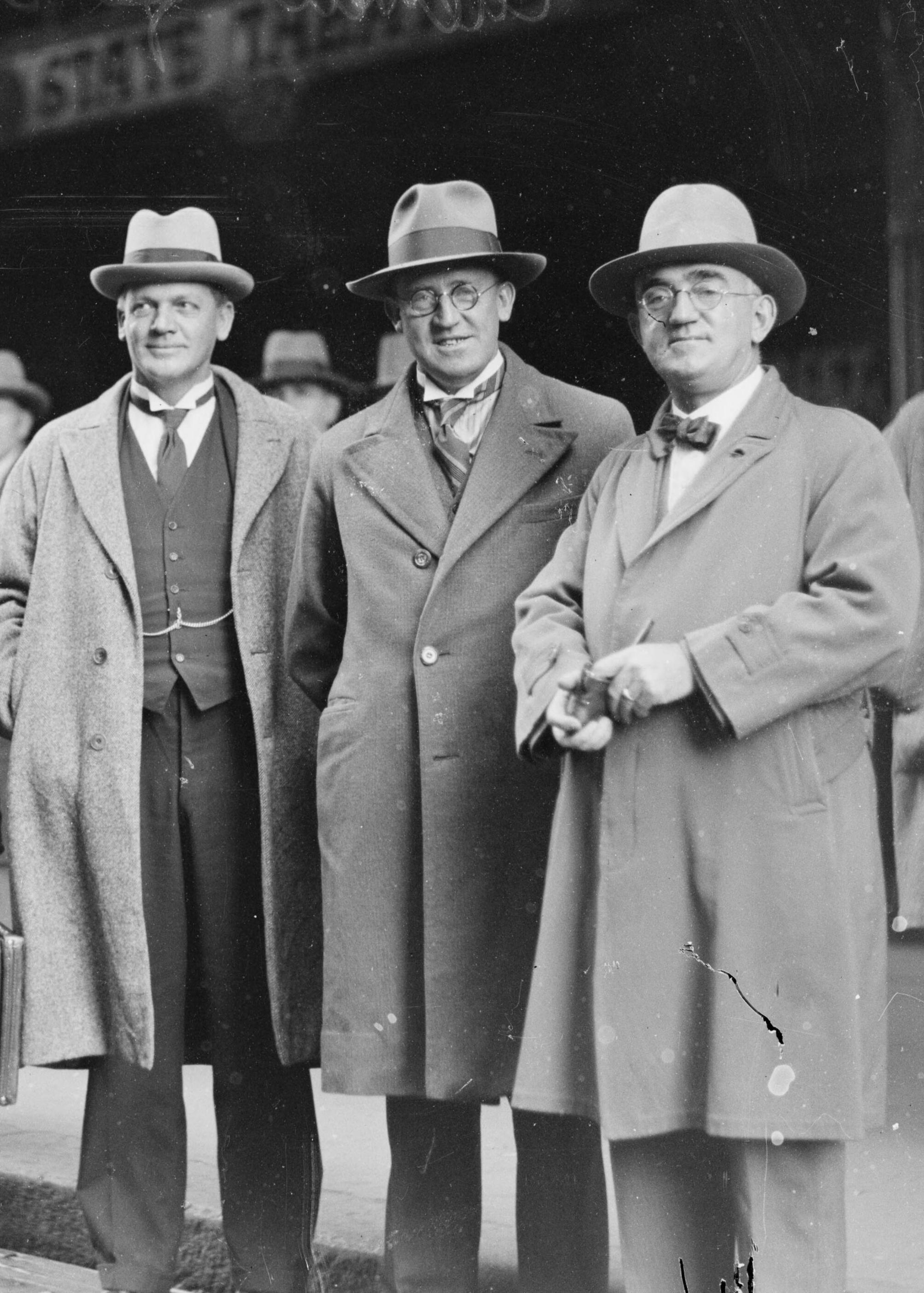
Calwell (centre) at the 1933 ALP Federal Conference in Sydney, along with Gordon Brown (left) and William Forgan Smith

Calwell joined the Labor Party at about the age of 18. He was elected secretary of the Melbourne branch in 1916, and from 1917 served as one of the Clerical Association's delegates to the state conference. He was elected to the state executive in the same year, and was state president of the party from 1930 to 1931 – at the time, the youngest person to have held the position. Calwell unsuccessfully sought Labor preselection for the Victorian Legislative Assembly and the Senate on a number of occasions, and was elected to the party's federal executive in 1926. He was an assistant secretary to state MP Tom Tunnecliffe for a period, and from 1926 served as secretary to William Maloney, the long-serving Labor member for the federal Division of Melbourne. Maloney would remain in parliament until his death at the age of 85, and Calwell made no effort to force an early retirement, despite being widely seen as the heir apparent to the seat.

== Curtin and Chifley governments (1941–1949) ==
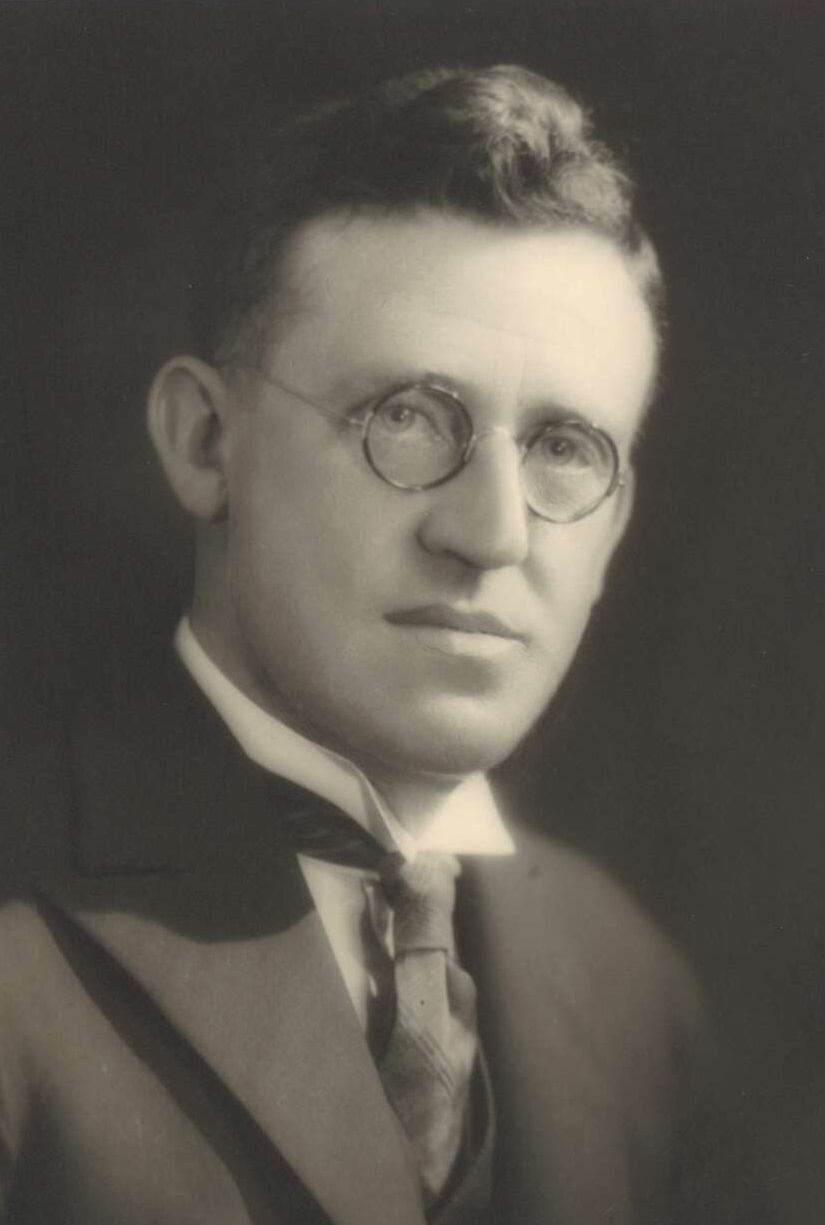
Calwell in 1940

Maloney announced he would not run for another term at the 1940 federal election. He died a month before polling day; as a result, no by-election was held in the Division of Melbourne. At the general election, Calwell easily retained the seat for the Labor Party. Due to his tenure as Victorian state president of the party and his long service as Maloney's secretary, he was already well known in federal parliament.

During World War II, Calwell was appointed as Minister for Information in the Second Curtin Ministry following the 1943 election, and became well known for his tough attitude towards the Australian press and his strict enforcement of wartime censorship. This earned him the enmity of large sections of the Australian press, and he was dubbed "Cocky" Calwell by his political foes, cartoonists of the period depicting him as an obstinate Australian cockatoo.

In economic policy, Calwell was not a great advocate of nationalisation. Gough Whitlam attributed this to Calwell's brand of socialism which was "an emotion rather than an ideology, a memory of the social deprivation he observed in Melbourne during the Depression years."

=== Immigration ===
When Ben Chifley succeeded Curtin as Prime Minister in 1945, Calwell – credited with coining the label "New Australian" – became the inaugural Minister for Immigration in the post-war Chifley government. As the chief architect of Australia's post-war immigration scheme, he became famous for his relentless promotion of mass migration at a time when many European refugees sought relocation from their war-torn homelands. Calwell overcame widespread resistance within the labour movement under the slogan "populate or perish", emphasising that Australia urgently required population growth to strengthen its national defence and industrial capacity following the Second World War. In July 1947, he signed an agreement with the International Refugee Organization (IRO) to accept displaced persons from war-torn Europe, ultimately bringing over 170,000 migrants to the country.

Calwell took a rigid approach to enforcing the mandatory two-year employment undertakings signed by displaced persons. Under the scheme, migrants were directed by the Commonwealth Employment Service to essential industries, heavy construction work such as the Snowy Mountains Scheme, regional infrastructure, and forestry. Those who abandoned their assigned placements faced immediate arrest and potential deportation. This strict enforcement policy attracted public controversy in May 1949 following press reports on the four-month detention in Long Bay Gaol of two Polish ex-servicemen, Tadeusz Storek and Franciszek Fruzynski, who had refused directed assignments following disputes over working conditions and medical fitness. Calwell defended his unyielding stance against recalcitrant workers, warning that he would not tolerate a "truculent few" undermining the integrity and discipline of the national migration programme.

Calwell's enthusiasm and drive in launching the migration programme was a notable feature of the second term of the Chifley government, and has been named by many historians as his greatest achievement (especially given the labour movement's hostility to earlier migration programs).

=== White Australia ===
Calwell was a staunch advocate of the White Australia policy. While Europeans were welcomed to Australia, Calwell attempted to deport many Malayan, Indochinese and Chinese wartime refugees, some of whom had married Australian citizens and started families in Australia. The main instrument of deportation was the War-time Refugees Removal Act 1949, which succeeded previous acts that allowed non-whites to stay in certain circumstances. Calwell's refusal to grant entry to Lorenzo Gamboa – a Filipino man who had fought with the U.S. Army and had an Australian wife and children – caused an international incident with the Philippines. President Elpidio Quirino expressed his disappointment "that our neighbour, to whom we looked for friendship, should exclude us because of our colour", and the Philippine House of Representatives passed a bill that would have excluded Australians from the country. Calwell remained unmoved, and told a rally prior to the 1949 election that "I am sure we don't want half-castes running over our country" and "if we let in any U.S. citizen, we will have to admit U.S. negroes. I don't think any mothers and fathers want to see that".

== Opposition (1949–1960) ==
Calwell left ministerial office from the 1949 election when the Chifley government was defeated by the Liberal Party, led by Robert Menzies. The following period in opposition was one of great frustration. Like many Labor parliamentarians and union officials at the time, Calwell was a Roman Catholic. The Australian Catholic Church was in this period fiercely anti-communist and had in the 1940s encouraged Catholic trade unionists to oppose communists within their trade unions. The organisations that co-ordinated Catholic efforts were called Industrial Groups. Calwell had originally supported the Industrial Groups in Victoria and continued to do so until the early 1950s. After Chifley's death in 1951, H. V. Evatt became the Labor leader, and Calwell became his Deputy. Under Evatt, Labor's attitude towards the Industrial Groups began to change, as Evatt suspected that one of their aims was to promote the Catholic element within the Labor Party.

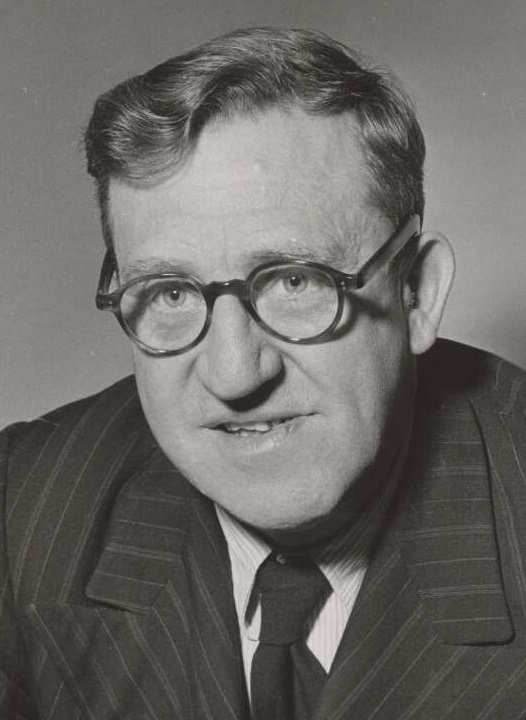
Calwell in 1951

Calwell's friendship with many of the leaders of the Industrial Groups (known collectively as "Groupers") led Evatt to privately question his loyalty. The two men thus had an increasingly difficult working relationship. This culminated in Evatt drafting and delivering the Labor Platform for the 1954 federal election without consulting Calwell. Labor was narrowly defeated at the polls, which deepened the rift between the two men.

Evatt's subsequent public attack on the "Groupers" and his insistence on their expulsion from the party placed Calwell in a difficult position. He was made to choose between the Evatt-led official Labor Party and the "Groupers" (who were mainly Catholic and Victorian). During a specially convened Labor Conference in Hobart in May 1955, the "Groupers" were expelled from the Labor Party and Calwell chose to stay within the party. Calwell's loyalty to the party was to cause him much personal and political anguish: he lost many of its oldest friends at this time, including the Archbishop of Melbourne, Daniel Mannix, and was, for a time, denied Communion at his parish church.

Ironically, this loyalty to the party did not prevent him from being deeply distrusted by the left wing of the ALP, especially in his home state of Victoria. For many years, he had a stormy relationship with the state Labor Party. He never favoured the communist philosophy and was eloquent in his attacks on communists, whom he once called, "Pathological exhibits... human scum... paranoiacs, degenerates, morons, bludgers... pack of dingoes... industrial outlaws and political lepers... ratbags. If these people went to Russia, Stalin wouldn't even use them for manure."

== Leader of the Opposition (1960–1967) ==
Evatt retired in 1960, and Calwell was acting leader before he succeeded him as Leader of the Australian Labor Party and Leader of the Opposition, with Gough Whitlam as his deputy. Calwell very nearly defeated Menzies at the 1961 federal election, owing to widespread discontent at Menzies' deflationary economic policies, as well as the unprecedented (and temporary) endorsement of the ALP by the usually pro-Liberal Sydney Morning Herald. It is generally accepted that unfavourable Democratic Labor preferences were the primary reason why Labor came up two seats short of toppling the Coalition despite winning an 18-seat swing and a majority of the two-party vote. Ultimately, a narrow loss in Bruce, located in the DLP's heartland of Melbourne, ended any realistic chance of a Labor win, but the Coalition was not assured of another term in government until the Brisbane-area seat of Moreton was called for the Liberals hours later. Labor actually won 62 seats, the same as the Coalition. However, two of those seats were in the Australian Capital Territory and Northern Territory, and members from the territories then did not count for purposes of forming a government.

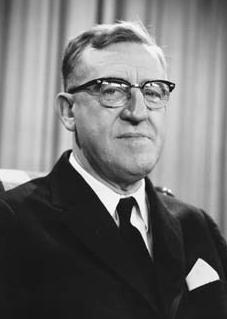
Calwell as Leader of the Opposition

After this, however, Menzies was able to exploit divisions in the ALP over foreign policy and state aid for Catholic schools to recover his position. Calwell opposed the use of Australian troops in Malaya and the establishment of American military communications bases in Australia. He also upheld the traditional Labor policy of denying state aid to private schools.

One of the Yirrkala bark petitions, signed by members of the Yolgnu people of Arnhem Land to protest the advance of bauxite mining on their traditional lands, was addressed to Calwell, which he presented to Parliament on 28 August 1963. An earlier one had been presented by Jock Nelson on the 14th. These petitions were the first traditional documents prepared by Indigenous Australians recognised by the Australian Parliament, and are the first documentary recognition of Indigenous people in Australian law. Parliament appointed a committee to investigate the Yolngus' grievances as a result of the petitions.

At the November 1963 election, Calwell hoped to build on his gains from two years earlier, but was severely damaged by a picture in The Daily Telegraph that showed him and Whitlam outside a Canberra hotel, waiting for word from Labor's Federal Conference as to the policies upon which they should fight the election.

In an accompanying story, Alan Reid of the Telegraph wrote that Labor was ruled by "36 faceless men". The Liberals seized on it, issuing a leaflet accusing Calwell of taking direction from "36 unknown men, not elected to Parliament nor responsible to the people." At the election, Labor suffered a 10-seat swing. Many thought that Calwell should retire, but he was determined to stay and fight.

Calwell made his strongest stand with his vehement opposition to Australia's military involvement in the Vietnam War and the introduction of conscription to provide troops for the war, publicly saying that "a vote for Menzies was a blood vote". Unfortunately for Calwell, the war was initially very popular in Australia and continued to be so after Menzies retired in 1966. Menzies' successor, Harold Holt, seized on this and fought the 1966 election on the Vietnam issue. Labor suffered a major defeat, losing nine seats while the Coalition won the largest majority government in Australian history at the time.

By 1966, Calwell's steadfast loyalty to the platform of the last Labor Government made him sound dated. He was still campaigning about socialism and nationalisation, and continued to defend the White Australia policy. An old-fashioned stump orator whose career was forged in the days of the raucous public meeting, Calwell always came across poorly on television; he turned 70 earlier in the year, but looked and sounded far older.

It was clear by this time that Calwell's image was struggling to keep up with his Deputy Leader, Whitlam. In particular, Whitlam's use of media gave him a notable advantage over Calwell. Whitlam had challenged Calwell's leadership in April; while Calwell survived by a 2-to-1 margin, he promised to resign if Labor lost the next election. True to his word, Calwell resigned as Labor leader two months after the election, in January 1967; Whitlam succeeded him.

=== Assassination attempt ===
Calwell was only the second victim of an attempted political assassination in Australia (the first being Prince Alfred in 1868). On 21 June 1966, Calwell addressed an anti-conscription rally at Mosman Town Hall in Sydney. As he was leaving the meeting, and just as his car was about to drive off, a 19-year-old student named Peter Kocan approached the passenger side of the vehicle and fired a sawn-off rifle at Calwell at point-blank range. However, the closed window deflected the bullet, which lodged harmlessly in his coat lapel, and he sustained only minor facial injuries from broken glass. Reflecting his Catholic values, Calwell later forgave and visited Kocan in the mental hospital (where he was confined for ten years), and through a regular correspondence encouraged his eventual rehabilitation.

== Later life and death ==
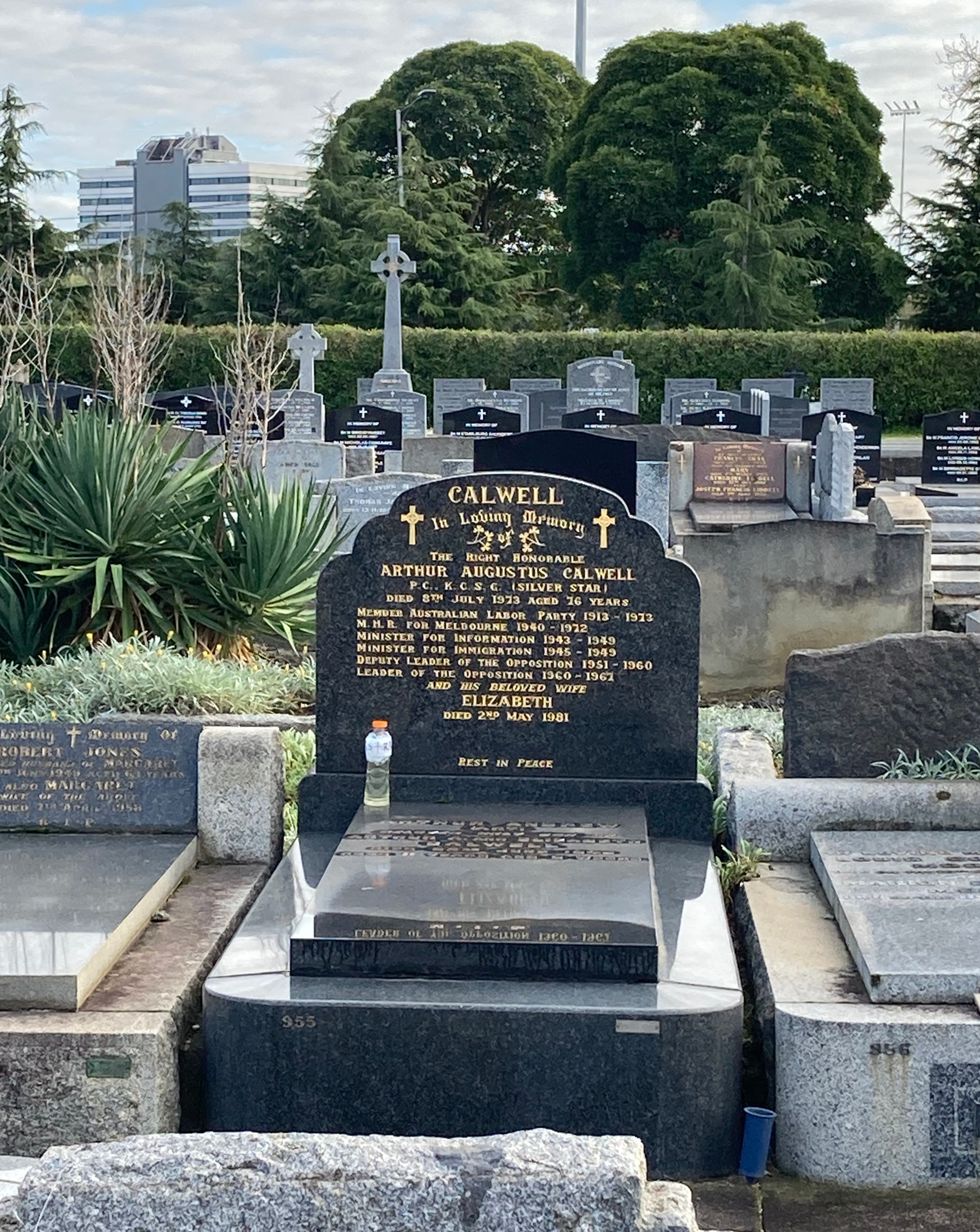
Calwell's grave at Melbourne General Cemetery

By the time Calwell's political career ended he was the Father of the House of Representatives, having served as an MP for 32 years. He was frequently critical of Whitlam, especially since he knew that Whitlam intended abandoning the White Australia policy.

At the 1972 election which brought Whitlam to the prime ministership, Calwell retired from Parliament. After a period of slow deterioration in his health, and a nearly four week stint in hospital, Calwell died on 8 July 1973. He was given a state funeral at St Patrick's Cathedral, Melbourne, and was buried at Melbourne General Cemetery. He was survived by his wife Elizabeth and his daughter Mary Elizabeth.

Notwithstanding Calwell's poor relations with the conservative press in Australia and his public battles against right-wing Catholics like Archbishop Mannix and B. A. Santamaria, he maintained a cordial relationship with Menzies. Menzies, for his part, never lost his respect and outright personal liking for Calwell. He attended Calwell's funeral, but (according to his biographer Allan W. Martin) became so overwhelmed by grief after arriving at the cathedral that he was unable to compose himself and leave his car.

== Personal life ==
Calwell's first marriage was to Margaret Mary Murphy (1893-1922) on 10 September 1921. She died five months later, on 23 February 1922.

He married Elizabeth (Bessie) Marren (1893-1981) ten years later, on 29 August 1932. She was a strong-willed, intelligent and well-read Irishwoman, from Derrylin, Fermanagh, Ireland who was social editor (as "Cecilia") of the Catholic weekly newspaper, the Tribune. In 1933 they launched the Irish Review as the official organ of the Victorian Irish Association. Calwell had met Elizabeth at Irish language classes run by the Gaelic League in Melbourne, and retained an interest in and fluency in the language. Calwell and his second wife had two children: Mary Elizabeth (b. 1 December 1934), and Arthur Andrew (b. 1 June 1937). His son, known as Art, died of leukaemia in June 1948 at the age of eleven. Calwell was profoundly affected by his son's death, and subsequently wore only black neckties. His wife later recalled it as "the cruellest blow Arthur has ever suffered. In fact, he has never been the same since that dreadful day". Calwell's daughter was described by The Canberra Times in 1995 as his "most passionate defender and admirer". In 2013, she published a sympathetic biography of her father titled I Am Bound to Be True, hoping to "correct what she believes is the maligning of his legacy".

Outside of the political arena, Calwell was a devotee of the North Melbourne Football Club and was the first life member of the club. He was always devoted to the Roman Catholic Church despite his many conflicts with church leaders. He was made a Knight Commander with Star of the Order of St Gregory the Great (KC*SG) by Pope Paul VI for his lifelong service to the church. This was despite much of the local hostility to Calwell by some Catholic bishops, who supported the splinter Democratic Labor Party.

== Racial views ==
Calwell's remark in parliament in 1947 that "two Wongs don't make a White" was widely reported at the time, both in Australia and overseas. This statement is widely quoted as evidence of Calwell's racism. The remark referenced to a Chinese resident called Wong who was wrongly threatened with deportation, and a Liberal MP, Thomas White, the Member for Balaclava, in addition to being a wordplay on the saying "two wrongs don't make a right". According to Hansard, Calwell said "there are many Wongs in the Chinese community, but I have to say — and I am sure that the honorable Member for Balaclava will not mind doing so — that 'two Wongs do not make a White'".

In his autobiography, Calwell said it was intended as a "jocose remark", and that it had been "so often misrepresented it has become tiresome". He attributed this to the press, stating that "because of some anti-Australian Asian journalist or perhaps because some Australian pressman with a chip on his shoulder, a Labor Party hater, the name of White was deliberately altered into a definition of colour".

In his final year in parliament, Calwell made several statements regarding non-white immigration to Australia. In March 1972 he publicly endorsed British Conservative MP Enoch Powell's views on race, later describing the United Kingdom as having experienced a "black tragedy". In May 1972, in response to comments from customs minister Don Chipp supporting a multi-racial society, Calwell released a statement strongly opposing non-white migration to Australia, stating that he was "appalled" at the thought and was "opposed to the creation of a chocolate-coloured Australia". In a subsequent interview with The Canberra Times, he stated that non-white migrants would lower community living standards as they "live on the smell of an oily rag and breed like flies".

Calwell believed himself to be free of personal prejudice against people of other races while believing that they should exist in separation. This is reflected by Calwell's comments in his 1972 memoirs Be Just and Fear Not in which he maintained his view that non-European people should not be allowed to settle in Australia. He wrote:

I am proud of my white skin, just as a Chinese is proud of his yellow skin, a Japanese of his brown skin, and the Indians of their various hues from black to coffee-coloured. Anybody who is not proud of his race is not a man at all. And any man who tries to stigmatise the Australian community as racist because they want to preserve this country for the white race is doing our nation great harm... I reject, in conscience, the idea that Australia should or ever can become a multi-racial society and survive.

Speaking regarding the incident involving Lorenzo Gamboa, when a questioner brought up his U.S. citizenship for consideration, Calwell responded "If we let in any U.S. citizen we will have to admit U.S. negroes. I don't think any mothers and fathers want to see that."

Between 1945 and 1952, an Australian brigade served as part of the British Commonwealth Occupation Force in Japan. In 1948, Calwell announced that no Japanese war brides would be allowed to settle in Australia, stating "it would be the grossest act of public indecency to permit any Japanese of either sex to pollute Australia" while relatives of deceased Australian soldiers were alive.

Of Indigenous Australians, Calwell wrote: "If any people are homeless in Australia today, it is the Aboriginals. They are the only non-European descended people to whom we owe any debt. Some day, I hope, we will do justice to them."

== Legacy ==
The federal division of Calwell in the northern suburbs of Melbourne, and initially western suburbs of Melbourne, is named after Calwell. The division was created and first contested at the 1984 federal election.

Parliament of Australia
| Preceded by William Maloney | Member for Melbourne; 1940–1972 | Succeeded by Ted Innes |
| Preceded by John McEwen | Father of the House of Representatives; 1971–1972 | Succeeded by Fred Daly |
| Preceded by John McEwen | Father of the Parliament; 1971–1972 | Succeeded by Fred Daly |
Political offices
| Preceded by Bill Ashley | Minister for Information; 1943–1949 | Succeeded by Howard Beale |
| New office | Minister for Immigration; 1945–1949 | Succeeded by Harold Holt |
| Preceded by H. V. Evatt | Deputy Leader of the Opposition of Australia; 1951–1960 | Succeeded by Gough Whitlam |
| Preceded by H. V. Evatt | Leader of the Opposition of Australia; 1960–1967 | Succeeded by Gough Whitlam |
Party political offices
| Preceded by H. V. Evatt | Deputy Leader of the Australian Labor Party; 1951–1960 | Succeeded by Gough Whitlam |
| Preceded by H. V. Evatt | Leader of the Australian Labor Party; 1960–1967 | Succeeded by Gough Whitlam |
