= 1966 Australian Labor Party leadership spill =

1966 Australian Labor Party Leadership spill
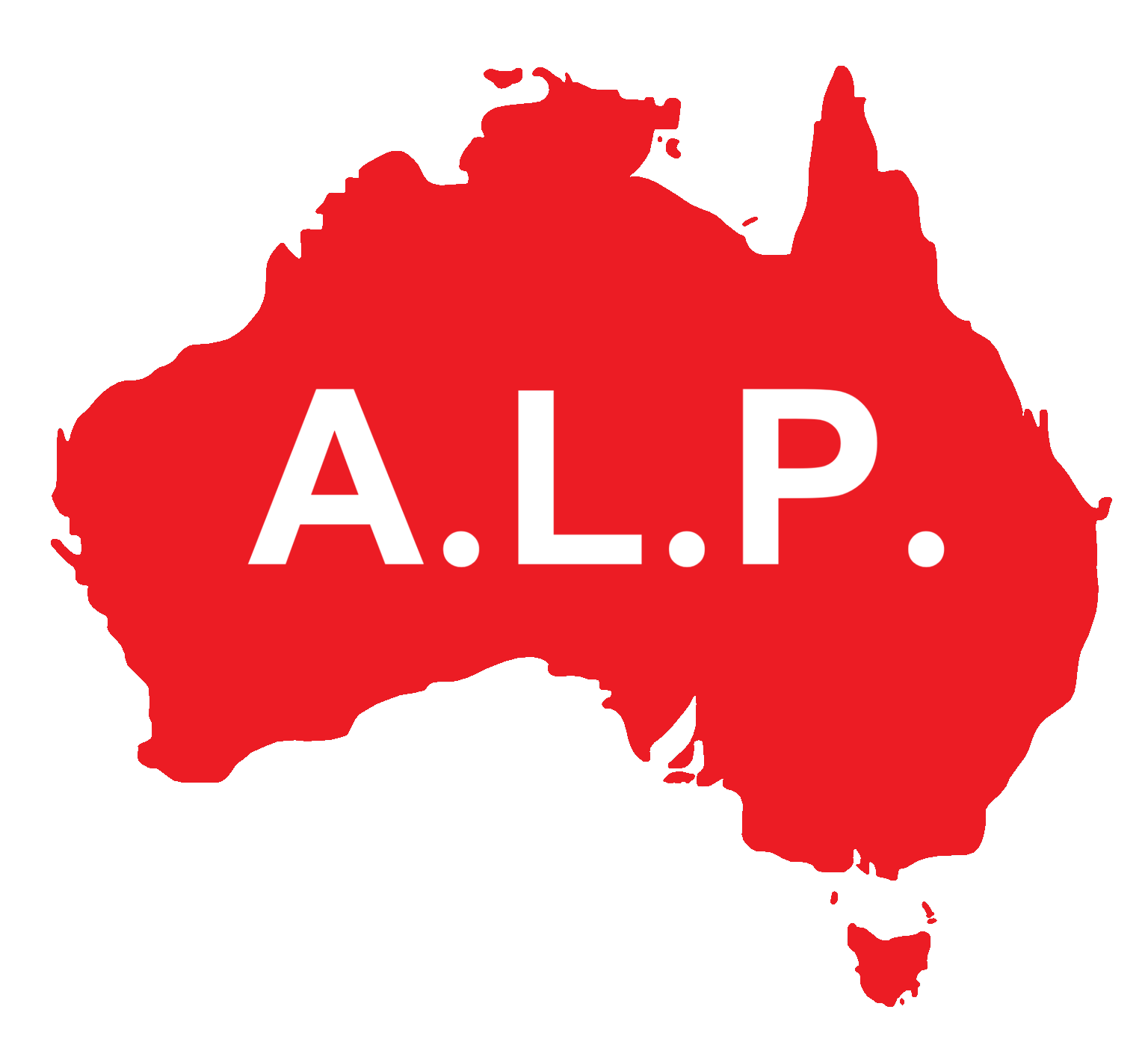
- 27 April 1966
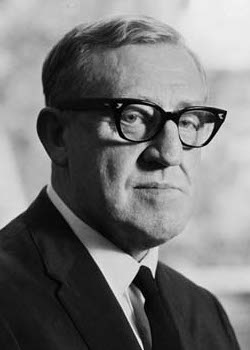

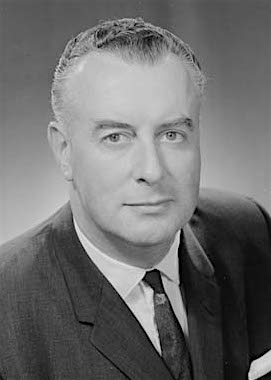
Candidate	Arthur Calwell	Gough Whitlam
Caucus vote	49 (66.2%)	25 (33.8%)
Leader before election
Arthur Calwell
Elected Leader
Arthur Calwell

A leadership spill in the Australian Labor Party, the party of opposition in the Parliament of Australia, was held on 27 April 1966. It followed a challenge by party deputy-leader Gough Whitlam against incumbent leader Arthur Calwell. Calwell received 49 votes to Whitlam's 25 in a caucus ballot. After claiming victory Calwell then announced that if Labor was defeated at the impending 1966 federal election, he would not stand for the leadership again.

== Results ==
The following table gives the ballot results:

Name	Votes	Percentage
Arthur Calwell	49	66.21
Gough Whitlam	25	33.79
