= Woman in a Lampshade =

Short story collection by Elizabeth Jolley

Woman in a Lamp Shade
- First edition (publ. Penguin Books)
- Author: Elizabeth Jolley
- Language: English
- Publication date: 1983

Woman in a Lamp Shade is a 1983 collection of short stories by Australian writer Elizabeth Jolley. The collection contains the following stories:

- "Pear Tree Dance"
- "Adam's Bride" (formerly titled "The Bench") from Meanjin, 1979
- "Hilda's Wedding" from Looselicks, 1976
- "Two Men Running" from The Bulletin, 1981
- "Uncle Bernard's Proposal" from Landfall, 1973
- "Paper Children"
- "The Play Reading"from Australian Good Housekeeping, 1981
- "The Libation"
- "One Christmas Knitting" from Memories of Childhood edited by Lee White, 1978
- "Butter Butter Butter for a Boat"
- "Woman in a Lampshade" from Westerly, 1979
- "Wednesdays and Fridays" from Quadrant, 1981
- "Dingle the Fool" from Quadrant, 1972
- "The Representative"
- "Clever and Pretty"
- "The Shed" from New Country edited by Bruce Bennett, 1976
- "The Last Crop"
