= Milk and Honey (Jolley novel) =

1984 novel by Australian writer Elizabeth Jolley

- Author: Elizabeth Jolley
- Language: English
- Genre: Fiction
- Publisher: Fremantle Press
- Publication date: 1984
- Publication place: Australia
- Media type: Print
- Pages: 185 pp.
- ISBN: 1863680179
- Preceded by: Mr Scobie's Riddle
- Followed by: Foxybaby

Milk and Honey (1984) is a novel by Australian writer Elizabeth Jolley. It was originally published by Fremantle Press in Australia in 1984.

== Synopsis ==
Jacob is a gifted cello player who comes to live as a boarder with an old European family in Perth so that he can further his musical education. But there he is married off to the family's daughter Louise while secretly longing for Madge who is a member of his orchestra, but who is 10 years his senior.

== Critical reception ==
Writing in The Canberra Times Marion Halligan noted: "Jolley is a most seductive writer. Her prose can be superb. But in this novel I could not believe sufficiently in her characters or her messages. I felt manipulated. I doubted that life is so doomful, simple or bizarre as she presents it."

A reviewer for Publishers Weekly stated: "While Jacob's equivocating romantic interests and the unraveling of the family's dark secrets are not completely satisfying, the melancholy elegance of Jolley's prose serves to compensate."

== Publication history ==
After its original publication in 1984 in Australia by publisher Fremantle Press the novel was later published as follows:

- Persea Books, USA, 1986
- Viking, UK, 1987
- Fremantle Press, Australia, 1992 and 1996

The novel was also translated into French in 1987, and German in 1990.

== Awards ==
The novel won the New South Wales Premier's Literary Award for Best Novel in 1985.

== See also ==
- 1984 in Australian literature
