= Stephen Rae (composer) =

Australian composer

- Born: 8 November 1961 (age 64); Sydney, Australia
- Other name: Douglas Stephen Rae
- Occupations: Composer, Musician, Actor
- Website: http://stephenraemusic.com

Douglas Stephen Rae is an Australian AFI award-winning composer, musician and actor who has composed music for a varied roster of television, film, theatre and advertising.

He has created scores for several iconic Australian television series, including Love My Way, Puberty Blues, Gallipoli and Safe Harbour, for which he won the 2018 FIPA (Federation Internationale de production Audiovisuale) Gold Prize for his music.

Stephen has won the Australian Film Institute (AACTA), the Film Critics Circle of Australia (FCC) and the Australian Guild of Screen Composers (AGSC) awards for Best Screen Music. He has also won a CLIO (New York) for his work in advertising.

He has composed music for theatre productions at Belvoir St Theatre and the Sydney Theatre Company. He has also worked as an actor in many productions with directors including Geoffrey Rush and Jim Sharman.

== Film and television ==
Composition credits include:

- El Metido
- Gallipoli
- Power Games
- The Turning
- My Mistress
- Howzat
- Puberty Blues
- Beaconsfield
- Paper Giants: The Birth of Cleo
- Love My Way
- Rush
- Dead Heart
- The Well
- Traps
- Secret Men's Business
- Fireflies
- Naked
- The Alice
- Mary
- Safe Harbour
- A Difficult Woman
- Outriders
- Big Sky

== Theatre ==
Rae has composed music for theatre productions at Belvoir St Theatre and the Sydney Theatre Company. He has also worked as an actor in many productions with directors including Geoffrey Rush and Jim Sharman.

== Album ==
His debut solo album, Feet Lift Off The Ground, blends music of different eras using Renaissance music for melodic inspiration. It also features Geoffrey Rush on several tracks reading poems that Rae has set to music.

== Awards ==
Rae has won the Australian Film Institute (AFI), the Australian Performing Rights Association (APRA), the Film Critics Circle of Australia (FCC) and the Australian Guild of Screen Composers (AGSC) awards. He has also won a CLIO (New York) for his work in advertising. Most recently, Rae won the 2018 FIPA (Federation Internationale de production Audiovisuale) Gold prize for his music for the Television Series "Safe Harbour".
