= Peter Kocan =

Australian author and poet

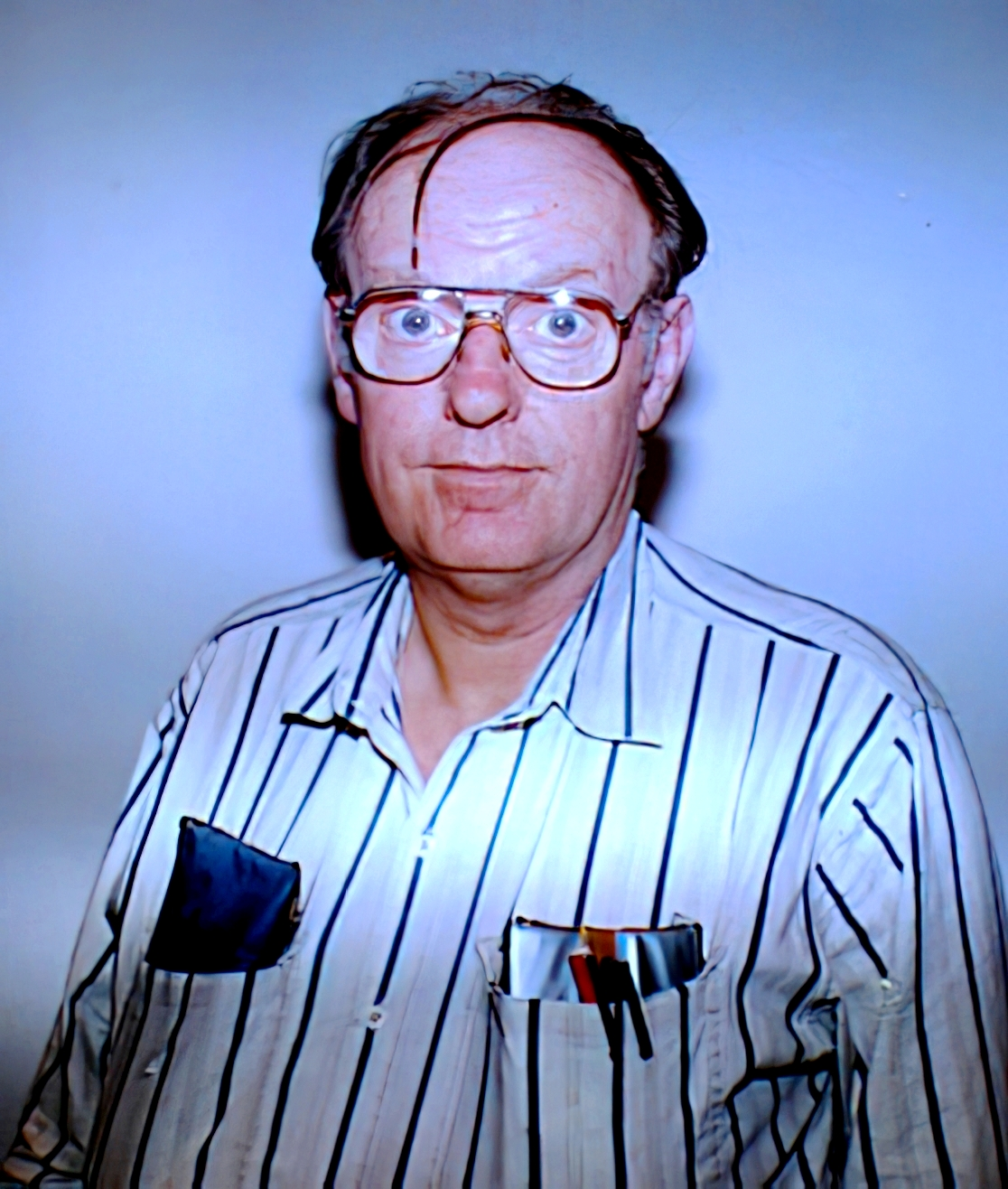
- Peter Kocan in 1999.
- Born: Peter Raymond Douglas; 4 May 1947 (age 79); Newcastle, New South Wales
- Occupations: Author, poet
- Years active: 1967-present
- Known for: Attempted assassination of Arthur Calwell and his work in literature

Peter Raymond Kocan (born Peter Raymond Douglas, 4 May 1947) is an Australian author and poet who attempted to assassinate Australian Opposition Leader Arthur Calwell on 21 June 1966. He fired a shot at point-blank range through a car window, but Calwell escaped with only minor facial injuries from broken glass. Kocan, 19 years old at the time, was sentenced to life imprisonment. He was transferred to the Morisset Mental Hospital and released in 1976.

He began writing in prison and has published several volumes of poetry. After his release from prison he continued to write poetry and novels.

== Early life ==
Kocan was born Peter Raymond Douglas on 4 May 1947 in Newcastle, New South Wales. His father, an engineer, was killed in a car accident three months before his birth. When he was five years old, his mother married Ludowit Kocan and the family moved to Melbourne. The marriage did not last and they moved on to Sydney, but Peter retained his step-father's surname. His mother later stated that his step-father had rejected him and that he had "never known the affection of a father".

Kocan left school at the age of 14, and according to his mother gave up sport and spent most of his time reading. During his teenage years he worked as a labourer and station-hand in the country, before later returning to Sydney. He wrote a letter to the headquarters of the Australian National Socialist Party in which he stated that he "admired Hitler because he had killed himself at the right time". According to Sydney Rowe, a psychiatrist who examined him, Kocan became fixated on death and suicide, and had fantasies about imitating Lee Harvey Oswald. When asked about his motive, Kocan told police "I had to do something to set me aside from all the other nobodies".

== Assassination attempt on Calwell ==
On the evening of 21 June 1966, while campaigning for the 1966 federal election, Arthur Calwell addressed an anti-conscription rally at Mosman Town Hall in Sydney. After Calwell left the meeting, just as his car was about to drive off, Kocan approached the passenger side of the vehicle, aimed a sawn-off rifle at Calwell's head and fired at point-blank range. The closed window deflected the bullet, which lodged harmlessly in Calwell's coat lapel. Calwell sustained only minor facial injuries from broken glass.

Kocan was tried and found guilty of attempted murder. He was sentenced to life imprisonment and was detained first at Long Bay jail in Sydney. In late December 1966, Kocan was transferred to Ward 21 for the Criminally Insane in Morisset Mental Hospital, at Morisset, south of Newcastle. Calwell visited Kocan there, and forgave him for the incident.

== Writing career ==
During his years in prison and hospital, Kocan immersed himself in history, literature and poetry after a chance remark by another inmate led him to discover the writing of Rupert Brooke. Between 1967 and 1969, the poet Michael Dransfield corresponded and exchanged poems with Kocan. These letters, which comprise drafts of poems by Dransfield, quotes of poems by other poets, and recommendations for books Kocan should read, are now held in the collection of the Academy Library of the University of New South Wales.

Kocan began to write poetry in 1967. Two selected works of poetry, Ceremonies for the Lost (1974) and The Other Side of the Fence (1975), were published while he was at Morisset. He was released on licence from Morisset in August 1976, and began to write about his experiences. Two autobiographical novellas, The Treatment (1980) and The Cure (1983), told of his life in the asylum. The Cure won the 1983 NSW Premier's Literary Award for Fiction. His other works include the poetry volumes Freedom to Breathe (1985), Standing with Friends (1992) and Fighting in the Shade (2000), the joint collection Primary Loyalties (1999), and the science-fiction novel Flies of a Summer (1988). The novel Fresh Fields (2004), is a fictionalised account of his youth. His most recent novel, The Fable of All Our Lives (2010), is based on his life after his release from Morisset.

Kocan lived for many years at Tuggerawong on the Central Coast of New South Wales, teaching and writing one act plays, poetry and fiction. He acted in twenty plays, and directed four for the Wyong Drama Group from 1981 to 2002. He gained public recognition for his work, receiving regular support from the Literary Board of the Australia Council, and has won various literary prizes. He graduated from the University of Newcastle in 1998 with a Bachelor of Arts (Honours), and obtained a master's degree. He moved to Brisbane in 2003.

== Awards and nominations ==
- 1977: Commonwealth Institute of London Prize for The Other Side of the Fence (poetry collection)
- 1982: Mattara Poetry Prize for From the private poems of Governor Caulfield
- 1983: New South Wales Premier's Literary Awards, Christina Stead Prize for fiction for The Cure
- 2005: New South Wales Premier's Literary Awards, shortlisted for Christina Stead Prize for fiction Fresh Fields (semi-autobiographical novel)
- 2005: Queensland Premier's Literary Awards, shortlisted for Best Fiction Prize for Fresh Fields
- 2010: Australia Council Writer's Emeritus Award

== Bibliography ==
=== Poetry ===
==== Collections ====
- Ceremonies for the Lost (1974)
- The Other Side of the Fence (1975)
- Twelve Poems (1975)
- Armistice (1980)
- The Treatment; and, The Cure (1984)
- Freedom to Breathe (1985)
- Standing with Friends (1992)
- Primary Loyalties (1999)
- Fighting in the Shade (2000)

==== Selected list of poems ====
Title	Year	First published	Reprinted/collected
The Victorian Age	1995	Kocan, Peter (December 1995). "The Victorian Age". Quadrant. 39 (12): 47.	
The statue	1995	Kocan, Peter (December 1995). "The statue". Quadrant. 39 (12): 47.	
Homer	1996	Kocan, Peter (July–August 1996). "Homer". Quadrant. 40 (7–8 [328]): 39.	
Send me Jenny Agutter	2009	Kocan, Peter (January–February 2009). "Send me Jenny Agutter". Quadrant. 53 (1–2): 31.	
The two horsemen	2009	Kocan, Peter (January–February 2009). "The two horsemen". Quadrant. 53 (1–2): 63.	
Reversal	2009	Kocan, Peter (January–February 2009). "Reversal". Quadrant. 53 (1–2): 92.	

=== Fiction ===
- The Treatment (1980)
- The Cure (1983)
- Flies of a Summer (1988)
- Fresh Fields (2004)
- The Fable of All Our Lives (2010)

=== One-act plays ===
- The Card Players (1981)
- Who Do You Think You Are? (1981)
- The Walking Stick of the Desert (1981)
- Home Fires Burning (1983)
- The Plot Sickens (1986)
- Lady Chatterly's Bunyip (1988)
- The Mummy's Comb (1993)
- Sold to the Gypsies (1995)

(all unpublished, dates given are the dates of their first performance)
