= Pamela Rabe =

Canadian and Australian actress (born 1959)

Pamela Rabe AM
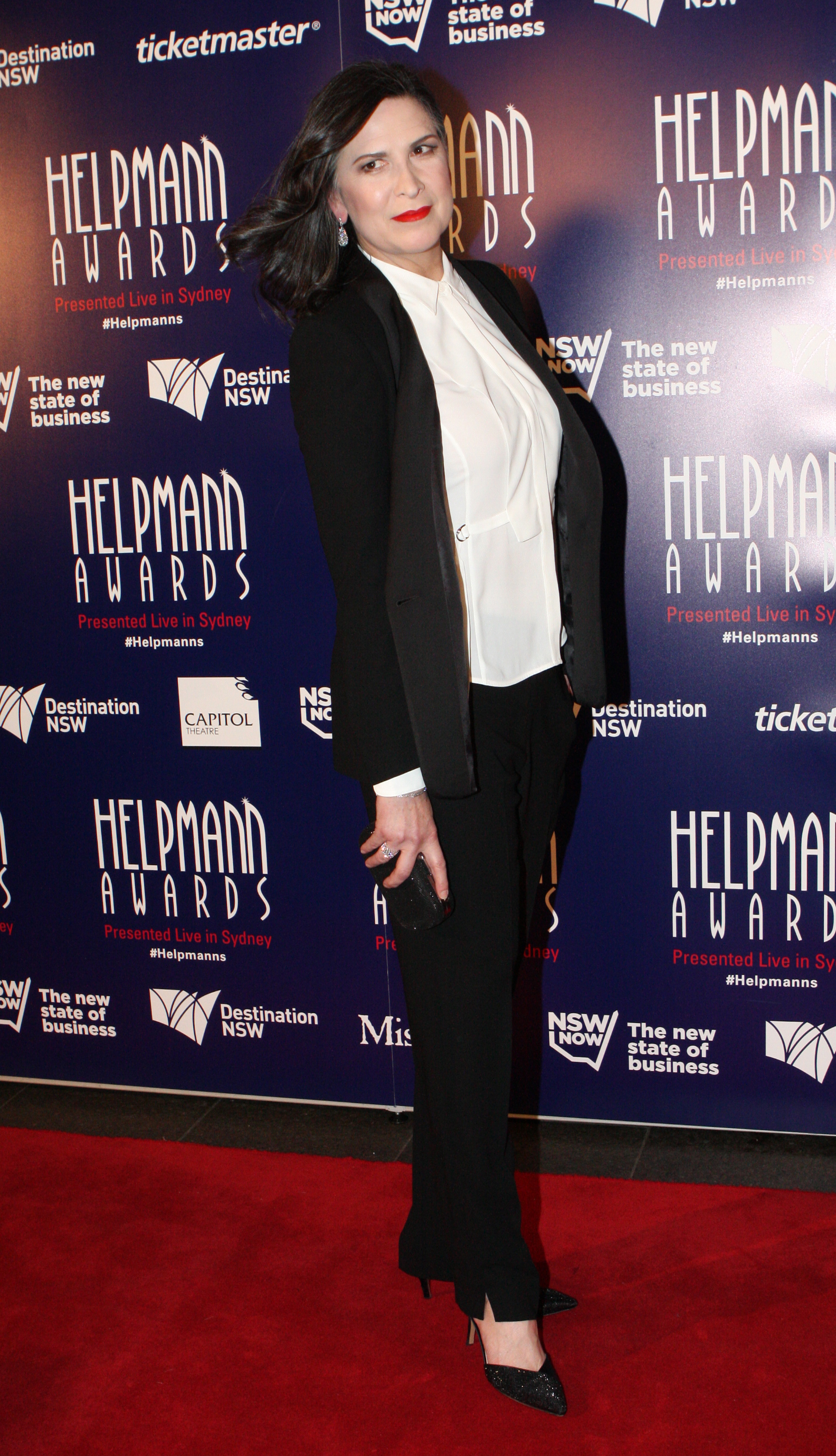
- Rabe in 2015
- Born: Pamela June Koropatnick; 30 April 1959 (age 67); Oakville, Ontario, Canada
- Occupations: Actress, director
- Years active: 1978–present (film, theatre & television)
- Notable work: Sirens (1994); Così (1996); Paradise Road (1997); The Well (1997); Wentworth (TV 2014-21)
- Spouse: Roger Hodgman (m. 1984)
- Awards: AACTA Award — The Well; AACTA Award — Wentworth; See all awards

Pamela Rabe AM (born Pamela June Koropatnick; 30 April 1959) is a Canadian and Australian actress and theatre director. A graduate of the Playhouse Acting School in Vancouver, Rabe is best known for her appearances in the Australian films Sirens, Cosi and Paradise Road, and for starring as Joan Ferguson in the television drama series Wentworth.

== Early life ==
Rabe was born in Oakville, Ontario, Canada in 1959. The seventh of eight children, she graduated from the Playhouse Acting School in Vancouver. Rabe relocated to Australia in 1983 with Australian director, Roger Hodgman. They were married in 1984.

== Career ==
=== Theatre ===
Rabe is a prolific contributor to theatrical life in her adopted country in acting and directing, across a wide range of genres - musicals, comedy and drama. She is a long-standing collaborator with the Sydney Theatre Company and the Melbourne Theatre Company. Rabe was once described by Melbourne theatre critic Alison Croggon as having the sort of presence that "makes shy people swallow hard and lesser mortals involuntarily bow".

Some of her other high-profile acting roles include Amanda Wingfield in Tennessee Williams's The Glass Menagerie at Belvoir, for which she won a Helpmann Award, Nora Boyle in Patrick White's The Season at Sarsaparilla, for which she won a Green Room Award for Best Actress, Richard III in the Sydney Theatre Company production of The War Of The Roses, which co-starred Cate Blanchett as Richard II. and Marquise Isabelle de Merteuil in Les Liaisons Dangereuses alongside Hugo Weaving.

In 2005, she performed an experimental play called Woman-Bomb, in which she inhabited the body and mind of a suicide bomber.

In 2010, she starred in the Melbourne stage production of David Mamet's play Boston Marriage.

In 2012, Rabe received a Helpmann Award for Best Female Actor in a Musical for her performance in Grey Gardens for The Production Company. In July 2015, she won a second Helpmann Award, this time for Best Female Actor in a Play, for her performance in The Glass Menagerie.

In late 2017, Rabe played the roles of Helene Alving in Henrik Ibsen’s Ghosts for Sydney's Belvoir St Theatre, Mrs. Higgins in the Julie Andrews-directed revival of My Fair Lady (replacing Robyn Nevin), and the role of Mary in Colm Tóibín's The Testament of Mary, at the Malthouse Theatre, Melbourne. In 2018, she starred in Lucy Kirkwood's The Children at the Melbourne Theatre Company.

Rabe turned her hand to theatre directing in 2009, and has directed several high-profile plays for Australian theatre companies, including the Australian premiere of In the Next Room (or The Vibrator Play), and Elling for the Melbourne Theatre Company. Rabe was nominated for a Green Room Award for best direction on both occasions. In 2012, Rabe was invited to be a member of the guest triumvirate who programmed the Melbourne Theatre Company season for that year.

Rabe would have returned to theatre in 2020 for the play Monster, but the performances were put on hold due to COVID-19 pandemic restrictions; it was finally announced that Monster would go ahead in 2022 but Rabe would withdraw from the play and the role went to Alison Whyte.

Rabe also performed a vocal performance of Shakespeare works in 2021 with the Melbourne Symphony Orchestra.

In 2023 Rabe joined the international tour of The Confessions.

On 11 September 2024, Rabe was announced as part of the Melbourne Theatre Co season to appear in Rebecca directed by Anne-Louise Sarks. On 1 November 2024, it was announced that Rabe would join Bert La Bonté for the 2025 Black Swan Theatre Company production of August: Osage County. On 20 January 2025, it was announced that Rabe and Tamsin Carroll won the award for Best Performance in a Leading Role for August: Osage County.

In 2025, Rabe co-directed and starred in the Sydney Theatre Co production of Samuel Beckett's Happy Days.

=== Film ===
In 1989, Rabe made her film debut with a minor role in Against the Innocent. Her second role came in 1993 when she was cast in John Duigan's romantic comedy Sirens (with Hugh Grant and Sam Neill). Rabe's first leading role was in the 1995 film Vacant Possession. Following this, she appeared in 1996's Cosi (with Ben Mendelsohn, Barry Otto, and Toni Collette), Lust and Revenge (directed by Paul Cox).

In 1997, she appeared in Paradise Road (starring Glenn Close and set during World War II) as well as playing Hester in The Well (an adaptation of Elizabeth Jolley's novel of the same name), for which she received an Australian Film Institute Award for Best Actress. More recently, she appeared in the Jasmila Žbanić film For Those Who Can Tell No Tales, and narrated the film Symphony of the Wild.

=== Television ===
Rabe's Australian television credits include an early guest role on the soap opera A Country Practice, recurring roles on the family series Ocean Girl and The Secret Life of Us, and a lead role in the short lived series Mercury.

In September 2013, it was announced that Rabe would join the cast of the Australian prison drama series Wentworth, a reimagining of the classic Network Ten soap opera Prisoner. She joined Wentworth in Season Two as sadistic prison governor Joan "The Freak" Ferguson, a role originally played by Maggie Kirkpatrick in Prisoner. Her character was initially killed off at the end of the fifth season, when she is buried alive by Will Jackson (Robbie Magasiva), and she made her then final appearances in two episodes of the sixth season as a figment of Will's imagination. The seventh season of Wentworth was intended to be the last, however, it was once again renewed and the ending of season seven was rewritten to include Joan, who is revealed to be alive. Rabe reprised her role for the 20-episode eighth and final season, which aired its first part in 2020, while the final part was aired in 2021. Rabe has been nominated for multiple awards for her performance, winning the 2015 AACTA Award for Best Lead Actress in a Television Drama and the 2018 Logie Award for Most Outstanding Actress.

In 2017, Rabe played the role of Maude in the six-part TV series Fucking Adelaide, which premiered at the Adelaide Film Festival in October 2017.

In 2018 Rabe would guest appear in Wentworth in Series 6, film mini series The Hunting and continue performing in theatre.

In 2022 Rabe joined the cast of Amazon comedy series Deadloch. Rabe would also join the first series of ABC drama Bay of Fires.

On 6 October 2026, Rabe was announced as part of the guest cast for the final season of The Artful Dodger.

=== Other work ===
Rabe served on the board of the Australian Film Institute from 1999–2002 and is a former member of the Board of Directors of the National Institute of Dramatic Art. Rabe serves on the board of the Malthouse Theatre in Melbourne.

== Filmography ==
=== Film ===
Year	Title	Role	Notes
1989	Against the Innocent	American Woman	
1993	Sirens	Rose Lindsay	
1995	Vacant Possession	Tessa	
1996	Così	Ruth	
1996	Lust and Revenge	Obnoxious Woman	
1997	Paradise Road	Mrs. Tippler	
1997	The Well	Hester	
2004	The Boy Who Feeds Cats	Narrator	Voice; short film
2013	For Those Who Can Tell No Tales	Mum	
2015	Symphony of the Wild	Narrator	Voice

=== Television ===
Year	Title	Role	Notes
1985	A Single Life	Margaret Bennett	Television film
1987	Nancy Wake	Madeleine	Miniseries
1990	A Country Practice	Marnie Rose	Season 10 - "My Sister's Keeper" (Parts 1 & 2)
1993	Seven Deadly Sins	Greed	Miniseries
1995	Ocean Girl	Commander Byrne	Recurring role; season 2 - 10 episodes
1996	Mercury	Claire Bannister	Leading role; season 1 - 13 episodes
1996	The Bite	Samira Nazib	Miniseries
1997	Frontier	Rosa Campbell Praed	Miniseries
2001	Stingers	Eve Reisner	Episode: "True Colours"
2003	The Secret Life of Us	Luciana	Recurring role; season 3 - 9 episodes
2003	CrashBurn	Andy	Episode: "Seven Letters or Less"
2005	Holly's Heroes	Mrs. Rocacelli	3 episodes
2014–2021	Wentworth	Joan Ferguson	Leading role Seasons 2–5, 8 Special guest role Season 6−7
2017	Fucking Adelaide	Maude	All 6 episodes
2019	The Hunting	Principal De Rossi	Miniseries
2021	Rosehaven	Margaret	Season 5
2023	Deadloch	Margaret Carruthers	6 episodes
2023–25	Bay of Fires	Magda	ABC TV series: 14 episodes
2027	The Artful Dodger	Guest Role	TV series

=== Presenting ===
Year	Title	Role	Notes	Ref.
2021	Wentworth Unlocked	Self-host	TV special	

== Stage (selected credits) ==
Year	Title	Role	Notes	Ref.
1978	The Bacchae	Theban Woman		
1979	All's Well That Ends Well	Helen		
1980	The Red Devil Battery Sign	Helena		
1980-81	The Man Who Came To Dinner	Mrs Dexter		
1981	The Notebook of Trigorin	Cook	Understudy	
1981	Wings	Nurse		
1982	See How They Run	Lady Montague		
1982	A Midsummer Night's Dream	Helena		
1982	See How They Run	Ida		
1981-82	The Hunchback of Notre Dame	Fleur-de-lys		
1983	The Winter's Tale	Emillia		
1983-84	84 Charing Cross Road	Margot		
1983	The Maid's Target	Aspatia		
2007	The Art of War	Crystal	Sydney Theatre Company	
2007	A Midsummer Night's Dream		Sydney Theatre Company	
2008	Gallipoli		Sydney Theatre Company	
2008	The Serpent's Teeth	Catherine Pavic	Sydney Theatre Company	
2009	The War of the Roses	Richard III	Sydney Theatre Company	
2009	God of Carnage	Veronique Vallon	Melbourne Theatre Company	
2010	Boston Marriage	Anna	Melbourne Theatre Company	
2010	Do Not Go Gentle	Bowers	FortyFive Downstairs	
2011	Hamlet	Gertrude	Melbourne Theatre Company	
2011	Grey Gardens	Little Edie	The Production Company	
2012	Les Liaisons Dangereuses	Marquise de Merteuil	Sydney Theatre Company	
2013	The Cherry Orchard	Ranevskaya	Melbourne Theatre Company	
2014	The Glass Menagerie	Amanda	Belvoir	
2015	Footfalls	May	State Theatre of South Australia	
2016	The Glass Menagerie	Amanda	Belvoir/Malthouse	
2017	Ghosts	Helene Alving	Belvoir	
2017	My Fair Lady	Mrs Higgins	Gordon Frost Organization	
2017	Testament of Mary	Mary	Malthouse Theatre	
2018	The Children	Hazel	Melbourne Theatre Company	
2018	Dance of Death	Alice	Belvoir	
2019	Cat on a Hot Tin Roof	Big Mama	Sydney Theatre Company	
2021	The Last Season	Summer	Force Majeure	
2021	The Cherry Orchard	Ranevskaya	Belvoir	
2023	The Confessions	Peg	International Tour	
2024	Seventeen	Jess	Melbourne Theatre Company	
2024	Ride the Cyclone	The Amazing Karnak (voice)	Hayes Theatre Co	
2024-2025	August: Osage County	Violet Weston	Belvoir & Black Swan Theatre Co (co production)	
2025	Happy Days	Winnie	Sydney Theatre Company (also director)	
2025	Rebecca	Mrs Danvers	Melbourne Theatre Company	
2026	Drive Your Plow Over The Bones of the Dead	Mrs Duszejko	Belvoir	
2026	Doubt: A Parable	Sister Aloysius	Sydney Theatre Company	

== Honours ==
Rabe was appointed a Member of the Order of Australia in the 2023 King's Birthday Honours for "significant service to the performing arts as a performer and director".

== Awards and nominations ==
Year	Format	Association	Category	Nominated work	Result	Ref.
1988	Theatre	Green Room Award	Female Actor in a Leading Role (Drama)	Gertrude Stein and a Companion	Won	
1991	Theatre	Green Room Award	Female Actor in a Featured Role (Music Theatre)	The Wizard of Oz	Won	
1993	Theatre	Green Room Award	Female Actor in a Leading Role (Drama)	Lost in Yonkers	Won	
1997	Theatre	Green Room Award	Female Actor in a Featured Role (Music Theatre)	A Little Night Music	Nominated	
1997	Film	AACTA Awards	Best Performance by an Actress in a Leading Role	The Well	Won	
1997	Film	Stockholm International Film Festival	Best Actress	The Well	Won	
1998	Film	Film Critics Circle of Australia Awards	Best Actor - Female	The Well	Nominated	
1998	Theatre	Mo Awards	Supering Musical Theatre Performer of the Year	herself	Won	
2002	Theatre	Helpmann Award	Best Female Actor in a Musical	The Wizard of Oz	Nominated	
2002	Theatre	Green Room Award	Female Actor in a Featured Role (Music Theatre)	The Wizard of Oz	Nominated	
2005	Theatre	Helpmann Award	Best Female Actor in a Play	Dinner	Nominated	
2007	Theatre	Helpmann Award	Best Female Actor in a Play	Mother Courage and Her Children	Nominated	
2008	Theatre	Green Room Award	Female Performer - Theatre (Companies)	The Season At Sarsaparilla	Won	
2009	Theatre	Helpmann Award	Best Female Actor in a Play	War of the Roses	Nominated	
2011	Theatre	Green Room Award	Director - Theatre (Companies)	In the Next Room (or The Vibrator Play)	Nominated	
2011	Theatre	Green Room Award	Female Actor in a Leading Role (Music Theatre)	Grey Gardens	Won	
2012	Theatre	Helpmann Award	Best Female Actor in a Musical	Grey Gardens	Won	
2012	Theatre	Green Room Award	Director - Theatre (Companies)	Elling	Nominated	
2015	Theatre	Helpmann Award	Best Female Actor in a Play	The Glass Menagerie	Won	
2015	Theatre	Helpmann Award	Best Female Actor in a Supporting Role in a Play	Beckett Triptych Footfalls	Nominated	
2015	Television	ASTRA Awards	Most Outstanding Performance by an Actor - Female	Wentworth (season 2)	Nominated	
2015	Television	AACTA Awards	Best Lead Actress in a Television Drama	Wentworth (season 3)	Won	
2016	Television	Logie Awards	Most Outstanding Actress	Wentworth (season 3)	Nominated	
2016	Television	AACTA Awards	Best Lead Actress in a Television Drama	Wentworth (season 4)	Nominated	
2017	Television	AACTA Awards	Best Lead Actress in a Television Drama	Wentworth (season 5)	Nominated	
2018	Television	Logie Awards	Most Outstanding Actress	Wentworth (season 5)	Won	
2018	Theatre	Helpmann Award	Best Female Actor in a Play	The Children	Won	
2020	Television	AACTA Awards	Best Lead Actress in a Television Drama	Wentworth (season 8 – P1)	Nominated	
2021	Television	AACTA Awards	Best Lead Actress in a Television Drama	Wentworth (season 8 – P2)	Nominated	
2022	Television	TV Tonight Awards	Favourite Female	Wentworth (season 8 – P2)	Nominated	
2025	Theatre	Sydney Theatre Awards	Best Performance in a Leading Role	August: Osage County	Won	
