= Sandra Levy (producer) =

Australian film and television producer

Sandra Levy AO
- Born: Sydney, New South Wales, Australia
- Occupations: Television and film producer
- Notable credit(s): High Tide; Police Rescue; The Well

Sandra Levy AO is an Australian film and television producer who has worked in both public and commercial television.

== Early life and family ==
Levy was born in Sydney. Her parents were Jewish communists from whom she inherited a love of the arts and a capacity for intellectual jousting. She married her second husband Australian television director Michael Carson in the 1970s. They had one son together, Simon, but the couple later divorced.

== Career ==
Levy was born in Sydney, New South Wales. She graduated from the University of Sydney with a BA majoring in English literature. While at university she was a fringe member of the Sydney Push.

After a short period as a school teacher, Levy joined the ABC as a trainee. In 1987 she was promoted to head of drama at ABC TV. From 1989 to 1998 she was head of drama at Southern Star Endemol. Levy returned to the ABC as director of television from 2001 to 2005. During her stewardship, the audience increased 24 per cent, due to the production of programs including Kath and Kim, Spicks and Specks, Enough Rope and The Chaser. In 2006 she joined Channel 9 as head of drama and a year later took over from Malcolm Long as CEO of the Australian Film, Television and Radio School for two four-year terms, stepping down on 24 June 2015.

== Filmography (selected) ==
=== Film ===
- High Tide (film) (1987)
- The Well (1997 film)

=== Television ===
- Palace of Dreams (miniseries) (1985)
- The Alien Years (miniseries) (1988)
- True Believers (miniseries) (1988)
- Police Rescue (series) 1989–1996)
- Children of the Dragon (miniseries) 1992

== Honours and recognition ==
In 2010 Levy was awarded a Doctor of Letters honoris causa by Macquarie University in recognition of her thirty years' work in film and television.

Levy was made an Officer of the Order of Australia in the 2014 Queen's Birthday Honours for "distinguished service to the arts as a film and television director and producer, and through strategic leadership and educational roles".
