= Elizabeth Jolley =

Australian writer

- Professor Elizabeth Jolley
- Born: Monica Elizabeth Knight; 4 June 1923; Birmingham, England
- Died: 13 February 2007 (aged 83); Perth, Western Australia, Australia
- Occupations: Novelist, professor of creative writing
- Spouse: Leonard Jolley
- Children: 3

Monica Elizabeth Jolley AO (4 June 1923 – 13 February 2007) was an English-born Australian writer who settled in Western Australia in the late 1950s and forged an illustrious literary career there. She was 53 when her first book was published, and she went on to publish fifteen novels (including an autobiographical trilogy), four short story collections and three non-fiction books, publishing well into her 70s and achieving significant critical acclaim. She was also a pioneer of creative writing teaching in Australia, counting many well-known writers such as Tim Winton among her students at Curtin University.

Her novels explore "alienated characters and the nature of loneliness and entrapment."

== Life ==
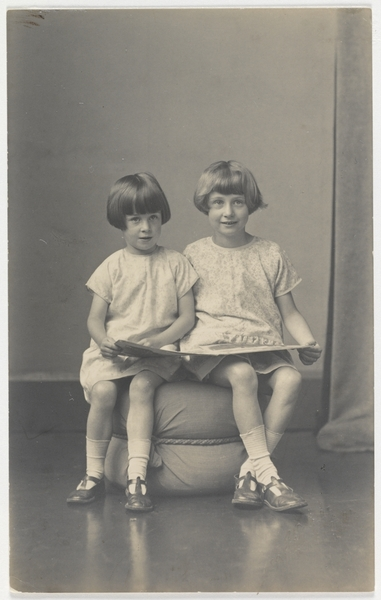
Elizabeth Jolley and (younger) sister Madelaine Winifred reading, c. 1927

Jolley was born in Birmingham, England as Monica Elizabeth Knight, to an English father and Austrian-born mother who was the daughter of a high ranking Railways official. She grew up in the Black Country in the English industrial Midlands. She was educated privately until age 11, when she was sent to Sibford School, a Quaker boarding school near Banbury in Oxfordshire which she attended from 1934 to 1940.

At 17 she began training as an orthopaedic nurse in London and later in Surrey. She began an affair with one of her patients, Leonard Jolley (1914–1994), and subsequently became pregnant. Leonard Jolley was already married to Joyce Jolley, who was also pregnant. Elizabeth moved in with the Jolleys, and her daughter Sarah was born five weeks before the birth of Susan Jolley, the child of Leonard and Joyce.

Elizabeth and Leonard subsequently emigrated to Australia in 1959 after they had married. They eventually had three children and Leonard was appointed chief librarian at the Reid Library at the University of Western Australia, a job he held from 1960 to 1979. Leonard told his family in England that it was Joyce and Susan with whom he had moved to Australia. For several years, Elizabeth wrote letters purportedly from Joyce and Susan to Leonard's British relatives. Leonard eventually asked his former wife to tell their daughter Susan that he had died.

Elizabeth and Leonard lived in the riverside Perth suburb of Claremont. In 1970 they also bought a small orchard in Wooroloo, a town in the Darling Ranges approximately 60 kilometres inland from Perth.

Elizabeth Jolley worked at a variety of jobs including nursing, cleaning, door-to-door sales and running a small poultry farm, and throughout this time she also wrote works of fiction including short stories, plays and novels. Her first book was published in 1976, when she was 53.

From the late 1970s, she taught writing at the Western Australian Institute of Technology, later Curtin University, and one of her students was another Australian novelist, Tim Winton. Her students have won many prizes including "several Australian/Vogel Awards (for a first novel), several different Premier's Awards, the Commonwealth Poetry Prize and the Miles Franklin Award".

She developed dementia in 2000, and died in a nursing home in Perth in 2007. Her death prompted many tributes in newspapers across Australia, and in The Guardian in the United Kingdom. Her diaries, stored at the Mitchell Library in Sydney, will be closed until after the deaths of her children or 25 years after her death.

Andrew Riemer, the Sydney Morning Herald's chief book reviewer, wrote in his obituary for her, "Jolley could assume any one of several personas – the little old lady, the Central European intellectual, the nurse, the orchardist, the humble wife, the university teacher, the door-to-door salesperson – at the drop of a hat, usually choosing one that would disconcert her listeners, but hold them in fascination as well".

On 16 November 2007, the performance of Johannes Brahms's A German Requiem by the West Australian Symphony Orchestra, chorus and soloists, under conductor Lothar Zagrosek, was dedicated to Jolley, for whom the Requiem had been a great source of joy and inspiration.

== Literary career ==
Jolley began writing early in her twenties, but was not recognised until much later. She had many rejections by publishers, 39 in one year alone. Delys Bird suggests that it was the post-modern features of her writing – "motifs repeated within and between novels and short stories, self-reflexivity and open-endedness" – that made it hard for them to be published at that time. She suggests that her eventual success owes a little to "the 1980s awareness of 'women's writing'", which had been catapulted to the mainstream after the success of other Australian female writers such as Helen Garner and Germaine Greer.

In the 1960s some of her stories were accepted by the BBC World Service and Australian journals, but her first book Five Acre Virgin was not published until 1976. Soon following were Woman in a Lampshade and Palomino, but it would not be until much later that these books would receive either positive reviews or high circulation.

She lapsed in her writing, discouraged by earlier failures, and was only to be published again in 1983 with Miss Peabody's Inheritance and Mr Scobie's Riddle. The latter won The Age Book of the Year and high acclaim, especially in Australia and the United States. A year later, Milk and Honey was awarded Christina Stead Prize for fiction in the New South Wales Premier's Literary Awards. In 1986, The Well won the top Australian literary prize – the Miles Franklin Award. The Sugar Mother was, as Riemer writes, "her characteristically idiosyncratic way of fulfilling a commission to write a novel commemorating the bicentenary of 1988".

Later in her career she wrote an autobiographical fiction trilogy, My Father's Moon (1989), Cabin Fever (1990) and The Georges' Wife (1993). In an article in The Age newspaper, 20 February 2007, written after her death, literary critic Peter Craven, was reported as saying, "She was a master of black comedy and she went on to write a wholly different form of autobiographical fiction that was lucid, luminous and calm".

Lovesong, her third last novel, is, Riemer suggests, "the riskiest book she wrote". It deals with the subject of paedophilia and demonstrates "an admirable refusal to be deflected from what she must have seen as the demands of her art and vocation".

In 1993, a diary she kept before her novels were published which recorded the experience of buying a hobby farm was published as Diary of a Weekend Farmer. A partly autobiographical collection of pieces, Central Mischief, appeared in 1992. She also wrote numerous radio plays broadcast by the Australian Broadcasting Corporation, and several of her poetic works were published in journals and anthologies during the 1980s and 1990s.

Jolley was made a professor of Creative Writing at Curtin University in 1998.

On 8 February 2008, Curtin University Library launched the online Elizabeth Jolley Research Collection, a virtual research centre for scholars interested in studying her and her work.

== Awards and nominations ==
- 1983: The Age Book of the Year Award for Mr Scobie's Riddle
- 1983: Western Australian Premier's Book Awards for Mr Scobie's Riddle
- 1985: New South Wales Premier's Literary Awards, Christina Stead Prize for Fiction for Milk and Honey
- 1986: Miles Franklin Award for The Well
- 1987: Western Australia Citizen of the Year
- 1988: Officer of the Order of Australia (AO) for services to literature
- 1988: Western Australian Institute of Technology Honorary Doctorate
- 1989: The Age Book of the Year Award, winner for My Father's Moon
- 1989: Canada/Australia Literary Award
- 1993: The Age Book of the Year Award, winner for The Georges' Wife
- 1993: Western Australian Premier's Book Awards, Premier's prize for Central Mischief
- 1994: National Book Council Award, Banjo for The Georges' Wife
- 1995: Macquarie University Honorary Doctorate
- 1996: Western Australian Writers Hall of Fame
- 1997: Australian Living Treasure
- 1997: University of Queensland Honorary Doctorate
- 1998: Miles Franklin Award shortlist for Lovesong

== Literary works ==
=== Novels ===
- Palomino (1980)
- The Newspaper of Claremont Street (1981)
- Miss Peabody's Inheritance (1983)
- Mr Scobie's Riddle (1983)
- Milk and Honey (1984)
- Foxybaby (1985)
- The Well (1986)
- The Sugar Mother (1988)
- My Father's Moon (1989)
- Cabin Fever (1990)
- The Georges' Wife (1993)
- The Orchard Thieves (1995)
- Lovesong (1997)
- An Accommodating Spouse (1999)
- An Innocent Gentleman (2001)

=== Short stories and plays ===
- Five Acre Virgin and Other Stories (1976)
- The Well-Bred Thief (1977)
- The Travelling Entertainer and Other Stories (1979)
- Woman in a Lampshade (1983)
- Off the Air: Nine Plays for Radio (1995)
- Fellow Passengers: Collected Stories of Elizabeth Jolley (1997)

=== Non-fiction ===
- Central Mischief: Elizabeth Jolley on Writing, Her Past and Herself (1992)
- Diary of a Weekend Farmer (1993)
- Learning to Dance: Elizabeth Jolley: Her Life and Work (2006)
