= 1993 in Australian literature =

This article presents a list of the historical events and publications of Australian literature during 1993.

== Events ==
- Alex Miller (writer) won the Miles Franklin Award for The Ancestor Game

== Major publications ==
=== Novels ===
- Liam Davison – Soundings
- Fotini Epanomitis – The Mule's Foal
- Rodney Hall — The Grisly Wife
- Dorothy Hewett — The Toucher
- Elizabeth Jolley — The Georges' Wife
- Thomas Keneally – Jacko
- David Malouf — Remembering Babylon
- Roger McDonald — Water Man
- Frank Moorhouse — Grand Days
- John A. Scott – What I Have Written
- Madeleine St John — The Women in Black
- Morris West — The Lovers

=== Short stories ===
- Sumner Locke Elliott – Radio Days

=== Crime and mystery ===
- Jon Cleary – Bleak Spring
- Peter Corris
  - Browning Battles On
  - Burn, and Other Stories
  - Cross Off
  - Matrimonial Causes
- Garry Disher – Deathdeal
- Jennifer Rowe – Stranglehold
- Kerry Greenwood – The Green Mill Murder

=== Science fiction and fantasy ===
- Terry Dowling – Twilight Beach
- Terry Dowling and Van Ikin – Mortal Fire: Best Australian Science Fiction (editors)
- Greg Egan – "Chaff"
- Rosaleen Love – Evolution Annie: And Other Stories
- George Turner – The Destiny Makers

=== Children's and young adult fiction ===
- Isobelle Carmody — The Gathering
- Carmel Charles — Winin: Why the Emu Cannot Fly
- Morris Gleitzman — Sticky Beak
- John Marsden — Tomorrow, When the War Began
- James Moloney – Dougy
- Dorothy Porter — The Witch Number
- Emily Rodda – Roan of Rin
- Tim Winton – Lockie Leonard, Scumbuster

=== Poetry ===
- Robert Gray — Certain Things
- J. S. Harry — "Mousepoem"
- Barry Hill — Ghosting William Buckley
- Philip Hodgins — The End of the Season
- Jill Jones — Flagging Down Time
- Jennifer Maiden — Acoustic Shadow
- Jan Owen — Blackberry Season
- John Tranter — At the Florida

=== Drama ===
- Louis Nowra — Radiance

=== Non-fiction ===
- Verity Burgmann — Power and Protest: Movements for Change in Australian Society
- Hazel Rowley — Christina Stead: A Biography
- Peter Singer — How Are We to Live?
- Bryce Courtenay — April Fool's Day

== Awards and honours ==
=== Lifetime achievement ===
Award	Author
Christopher Brennan Award	Geoffrey Dutton
Patrick White Award	Amy Witting

=== Literary ===
Award	Author	Title	Publisher
The Age Book of the Year Award	Elizabeth Jolley	The Georges' Wife	Viking
ALS Gold Medal	Elizabeth Riddell	Selected Poems	Angus and Robertson
Colin Roderick Award	Cassandra Pybus	Gross Moral Turpitude: The Orr Case Reconsidered	Heinemann
New South Wales Premier's Literary Awards – Book of the Year	Gracie Green, Lucille Gill and Joe Tramacchi	Tjarany Roughtail	Magabala Books

=== Fiction ===
==== International ====
Award	Category	Author	Title	Publisher
Commonwealth Writers' Prize	Best Novel, SE Asia and South Pacific region	Alex Miller	The Ancestor Game	Penguin Books
Commonwealth Writers' Prize	Best First Novel, SE Asia and South Pacific region	Andrew McGahan	Praise	Allen & Unwin
Commonwealth Writers' Prize	Best Overall Novel	Alex Miller	The Ancestor Game	Penguin Books

==== National ====
Award	Author	Title	Publisher
Adelaide Festival Awards for Literature	Not awarded		
The Age Book of the Year Award	Elizabeth Jolley	The Georges' Wife	Viking
The Australian/Vogel Literary Award	Helen Demidenko	The Hand That Signed the Paper	Allen and Unwin
Miles Franklin Award	Alex Miller	The Ancestor Game	Penguin Books
New South Wales Premier's Literary Awards	David Malouf	Remembering Babylon	Random House Australia
Victorian Premier's Literary Awards	Brian Castro	After China	Allen & Unwin
Western Australian Premier's Book Awards	Gail Jones	The House of Breathing	Fremantle Arts Centre Press

=== Poetry ===
Award	Author	Title	Publisher
Adelaide Festival Awards for Literature	Not awarded		
The Age Book of the Year Award	John Tranter	At the Florida	University of Queensland Press
Anne Elder Award	Terry Whitebeach	Bird Dream	in Four New Poets Penguin
Grace Leven Prize for Poetry	Philip Hodgins	The End of the Season : Pastoral Poems	Brindabella Press
Mary Gilmore Award	Jill Jones	The Mask and Jagged Star	Hazard Press
New South Wales Premier's Literary Awards	Les Murray	Translations from the Natural World	Isabella Press
Victorian Premier's Literary Awards	Les Murray	Translations from the Natural World	Isabella Press

=== Children and Young Adult ===
Award	Category	Author	Title	Publisher
Adelaide Festival Awards for Literature	Children's	Not awarded		
Children's Book of the Year Award	Older Readers	Melina Marchetta	Looking for Alibrandi	Puffin Books
Children's Book of the Year Award	Picture Book	Bob Graham	Rose Meets Mr Wintergarten	Penguin Books
New South Wales Premier's Literary Awards	Young People's Literature	Gracie Greene, Lucille Gill and Joe Tramacchi	Tjarany Roughtail	Magabala Books
Victorian Premier's Prize for Young Adult Fiction		Anna Fienberg	Ariel, Zed and the Secret of Life	Allen and Unwin

=== Science fiction and fantasy ===
Award	Category	Author	Title	Publisher
Australian SF Achievement Award	Best Australian Long Fiction	Greg Egan	Quarantine	Legend
Australian SF Achievement Award	Best Australian Short Fiction	Greg Egan	"Closer"	Eidolon #9 Winter 1992

=== Drama ===
Award	Category	Author	Title
New South Wales Premier's Literary Awards	FilmScript	Baz Luhrmann and Craig Pearce	Strictly Ballroom
New South Wales Premier's Literary Awards	Play	Nicholas Parsons	Dead Heart
Victorian Premier's Literary Awards	Drama	Michael Gurr	Sex Diary of an Infidel

=== Non-fiction ===
Award	Author	Title	Publisher
Adelaide Festival Awards for Literature	Not awarded		
The Age Book of the Year Award	Janet McCalman	Journeyings: the Biography of a Middle-Class Generation 1920-1990	Melbourne University Press
New South Wales Premier's Literary Awards	Judith Brett	Robert Menzies Forgotten People	Pan Macmillan Australia
New South Wales Premier's Literary Awards	Meme McDonald	Put Your Whole Self In	Penguin Books Australia
Victorian Premier's Literary Awards	Greg Dening	Mr Bligh's Bad Language	Cambridge University Press

== Deaths ==
A list, ordered by date of death (and, if the date is either unspecified or repeated, ordered alphabetically by surname) of deaths in 1993 of Australian literary figures, authors of written works or literature-related individuals follows, including year of birth.

- 9 January — Paul Hasluck, statesman, poet, biographer and writer on politics (born 1905)
- 19 January — Nancy Keesing, poet, writer, editor and promoter of Australian literature (born 1923)
- 4 February — Leonard Frank Meares, writer of western fiction (born 1921)
- 1 March — Ronald McCuaig, poet, journalist, literary critic, humourist and children's author (born 1908)
- 23 March — Robert Harris, poet (born 1951)
- 1 April — Kevin Gilbert, author, activist, artist, poet, playwright and printmaker (born 1933)
- 12 April — Alexander Turner, poet, playwright, and theatre and radio producer (born 1907)
- 22 April — Margaret Diesendorf, linguist, poet, editor, translator and educationist (born 1912 Vienna, Austria)
- 18 June — Alexandra Hasluck, historian (born 1908)
- 1 July – Eric Irvin, historian and poet (born 1908)
- 25 August — Florence James, author and literary agent (born 1902)
- 16 September — Oodgeroo Noonuccal, poet, political activist, artist and educator (born 1920)

== See also ==
- 1993 in Australia
- 1993 in literature
- 1993 in poetry
- List of years in literature
- List of years in Australian literature
