= 1991 in Australian literature =

This article presents a list of the historical events and publications of Australian literature during 1991.

== Events ==
- David Malouf won the Miles Franklin Award for The Great World

== Major publications ==
=== Novels ===
- Peter Carey — The Tax Inspector
- Brian Castro — Double-Wolf
- Bryce Courtenay — Tandia
- Robert Drewe — Our Sunshine
- David Foster — Mates of Mars
- Alan Gould — To the Burning City
- Rodney Hall — The Second Bridegroom
- Thomas Keneally
  - Chief of Staff (as by "William Coyle")
  - Flying Hero Class
- Simon Leys — The Death of Napoleon
- Colleen McCullough — The Grass Crown
- Gillian Mears — The Mint Lawn
- Morris West — The Ringmaster
- Tim Winton — Cloudstreet

=== Short stories ===
- Lily Brett – What God Wants
- Suzanne Edgar — Counting Backwards and Other Stories

=== Crime and mystery ===
- Jon Cleary — Pride's Harvest
- Peter Corris
  - Aftershock
  - Wet Graves
- Garry Disher — Kickback
- Kerry Greenwood — Murder on the Ballarat Train
- Brenda Walker — Crush

=== Science fiction and fantasy ===
- Greg Egan – "Appropriate Love"
- Keith Taylor – Felimid's Homecoming
- George Turner – Brain Child

=== Children's and young adult fiction ===
- Margaret Barbalet — The Wolf
- Anna Fienberg — The Magnificent Nose and Other Marvels
- Jackie French — Rain Stones (for children)
- Robin Klein — Came Back to Show You I Could Fly
- John Marsden — Letters from the Inside

=== Poetry ===
- Alison Croggon — This is the Stone
- Robert Gray and Geoffrey Lehmann — Australian Poetry in the Twentieth Century
- Kevin Hart – Peniel
- A. D. Hope — Orpheus
- Jean Kent — Practising Breathing
- G. A. Wilkes – A Treasury of Bush Verse (edited)

=== Drama ===
- Michael Gow — Furious

=== Non-fiction ===
- Bruce Bennett — Spirit in Exile, Peter Porter and His Poetry
- Barry Hill — Sitting In
- Julie Lewis — Olga Masters, A Lot of Living
- David Marr — Patrick White : A Life

== Awards and honours ==
- Robert Hughes AO, for "service to art and to the promotion of Australian culture"
- Bruce Beaver AM, for "service to literature, particularly in the field of poetry"
- David Rowbotham AM, for "service to literature"
- Patricia Scott AM, for "service to children's literature"

=== Lifetime achievement ===
Award	Author
Christopher Brennan Award	Elizabeth Riddell
Patrick White Award	David Martin

=== Literary ===
Award	Author	Title	Publisher
The Age Book of the Year Award	David Marr	Patrick White : A Life	Jonathan Cape
ALS Gold Medal	Elizabeth Jolley	Cabin Fever	Viking
Colin Roderick Award	Joan Dugdale	Struggle of Memory	University of Queensland Press

=== Fiction ===
==== International ====
Award	Category	Author	Title	Publisher
Commonwealth Writers' Prize	Best Novel, SE Asia and South Pacific region	David Malouf	The Great World	Chatto & Windus
Commonwealth Writers' Prize	Best Overall Novel	David Malouf	The Great World	Chatto & Windus

==== National ====
Award	Author	Title	Publisher
Adelaide Festival Awards for Literature	Not awarded		
The Age Book of the Year Award	Brian Castro	Double-Wolf	Allen & Unwin
The Australian/Vogel Literary Award	Andrew McGahan	Praise	Allen and Unwin
Miles Franklin Award	David Malouf	The Great World	Chatto & Windus
New South Wales Premier's Literary Awards	Nigel Krauth	JF Was Here	Allen and Unwin
Victorian Premier's Literary Awards	Finola Moorhead	Still Murder	Penguin
Western Australian Premier's Book Awards	Nicholas Hasluck	The Country Without Music	Penguin Books
Western Australian Premier's Book Awards	Tim Winton	Cloudstreet	McPhee Gribble

=== Poetry ===
Award	Author	Title	Publisher
Adelaide Festival Awards for Literature	Not awarded		
Anne Elder Award	Alison Croggon	This is the Stone	Penguin
Grace Leven Prize for Poetry	Les Murray	Dog Fox Field	Angus & Robertson
Mary Gilmore Award	Jean Kent	Vernadahs	Hale & Iremonger
New South Wales Premier's Literary Awards	Jennifer Maiden	The Winter Baby	Angus & Robertson
Victorian Premier's Literary Awards	Jennifer Maiden	The Winter Baby	Angus & Robertson

=== Children and Young Adult ===
Award	Category	Author	Title	Publisher
Adelaide Festival Awards for Literature	Children's	Not awarded		
Children's Book of the Year Award	Older Readers	Gary Crew	Strange Objects	Heinemann
Children's Book of the Year Award	Picture Book	Bob Graham	Greetings from Sandy Beach	Lothian
New South Wales Premier's Literary Awards	Young People's Literature	Gary Crew	Strange Objects	Heinemann
Victorian Premier's Prize for Young Adult Fiction		Gary Crew	Strange Objects	Heinemann

=== Science fiction and fantasy ===
Award	Category	Author	Title	Publisher
Australian SF Achievement Award	Best Australian Long Fiction	Terry Dowling	Rynosseros	Aphelion
Australian SF Achievement Award	Best Australian Short Fiction	Sean McMullen	"While the Gate is Open"	The Magazine of Fantasy & Science Fiction March 1990

=== Drama ===
Award	Category	Author	Title
New South Wales Premier's Literary Awards	FilmScript	Not awarded	
New South Wales Premier's Literary Awards	Play	Hannie Rayson	Hotel Sorrento
Victorian Premier's Literary Awards	Drama	Katherine Thomson	Diving for Pearls

=== Non-fiction ===
Award	Author	Title	Publisher
Adelaide Festival Awards for Literature	Not awarded		
The Age Book of the Year Award	David Marr	Patrick White : A Life	Jonathan Cape
New South Wales Premier's Literary Awards	Barry Hill	Sitting In	William Heinemann Australia
New South Wales Premier's Literary Awards	Drusilla Modjeska	Poppy	McPhee Gribble
Victorian Premier's Literary Awards	Dorothy Hewett	Wild Card	McPhee Gribble

== Deaths ==
A list, ordered by date of death (and, if the date is either unspecified or repeated, ordered alphabetically by surname) of deaths in 1991 of Australian literary figures, authors of written works or literature-related individuals follows, including year of birth.

- 21 February — Dorothy Auchterlonie Green, academic, literary critic and poet (born 1915)
- 30 March — Joan Colebrook, journalist and writer (born 1910)
- 3 April — Coral Lansbury, writer and academic (born 1929)
- 7 April — Bob Brissenden, poet, novelist, critic and academic (born 1928)
- 2 May — Ronald McKie, novelist (born 1909)
- 23 May — Manning Clark, historian (born 1915)
- 24 June — Sumner Locke Elliott, novelist and playwright (born 1917)
- 17 November — Pixie O'Harris, children's book author and illustrator (born 1903)
- 1 December — Barbara Hanrahan, novelist and artist (born 1939)

== See also ==
- 1991 in Australia
- 1991 in literature
- 1991 in poetry
- List of years in literature
- List of years in Australian literature
