= List of fictional private investigators =

This is a partial list of fictional private investigators — also known as private eyes or PIs — who have appeared in various works of literature, film, television, and games.

Detective	Creator	Debut
Karen Andersen	Louise Burfitt-Dons	The Missing Activist (2018)
Angel	Joss Whedon	Angel (TV) (1999)
Harry Angel	William Hjortsberg	Falling Angel (1978)
Lew Archer	Ross Macdonald	The Moving Target (1949)
Bilqees "Bobby" Ahmed	Samar Shaikh	Bobby Jasoos (2014)
Jagga Bagchi	Anurag Basu	Jagga Jasoos (2017)
Byomkesh Bakshi	Sharadindu Bandyopadhyay	Satyanweshi (1934)
Goenda Baradacharan	Shirshendu Mukhopadhyay	Monojder Advut Bari
Parashor Barma	Premendra Mitra	Nagchampa (1968)
Benoit Blanc	Rian Johnson	Knives Out (2019)
Kate Brannigan	Val McDermid	Dead Beat (1992)
Nestor Burma	Léo Malet	120, rue de la Gare (1943)
Joe Caneili	Hayford Peirce	Trouble in Tahiti: P.I. Joe Caneili, Discrétion Assurée (2000)
Frank Cannon	Edward Hume	Cannon (TV) (1971)
Carlotta Carlyle	Linda Barnes	A Trouble of Fools (1987)
Rex Carver	Victor Canning	The Whip Hand (1965)
Dipak Chatterjee	Swapan Kumar	Adrishya Sanket (1953)
Detective Chimp	John Broome and Carmine Infantino	Adventures of Rex the Wonder Dog #4 (July–August 1952)
Emerson Cod	Bryan Fuller	Pushing Daisies (TV) (2007)
Elvis Cole	Robert Crais	The Monkey's Raincoat (1987)
The Continental Op	Dashiell Hammett	The Tenth Clew (1924)
Alexa Crowe	Claire Tonkin	My Life Is Murder (TV) (2019)
Clifford Dee	J. Denison Reed	Cliffords War: The Bluegrass Battleground (2021) Cliffords War: Without End (2022)
Frankie Drake	Carol Hay and Michelle Ricci	Frankie Drake Mysteries (TV) (2018)
Harry Dresden	Jim Butcher	Storm Front (2000); The Dresden Files (TV) (2007)
Nancy Drew	Carolyn Keene	The Secret of the Old Clock (1930)
Feluda, or Prodosh Chandra Mitra	Satyajit Ray	Feludar Goendagiri (1965)
Phryne Fisher	Kerry Greenwood	Cocaine Blues (1989)
Jessica Fletcher	Peter S. Fischer, Richard Levinson and William Link	Murder, She Wrote (TV) (1984)
Dan Fortune	Michael Collins	Act of Fear (1967)
Josephine Fuller	Lynne Murray	Larger Than Death (1997)
Ganesh	Sujatha	Nylon Kayiru (1968)
Dirk Gently	Douglas Adams	Dirk Gently's Holistic Detective Agency (1987)
J.J. 'Jake' Gittes	Robert Towne	Chinatown (Film) (1974)
Lindsay Gordon	Val McDermid	Report for Murder (1987)
Bernhard "Bernie" Gunther	Philip Kerr	March Violets (1989)
Mike Hammer	Mickey Spillane	I, the Jury (1947)
Cliff Hardy	Peter Corris	The Dying Trade (1980)
Frank and Joe Hardy	Franklin Dixon	The Tower Treasure (1930)
Sherlock Holmes	Sir Arthur Conan Doyle	A Study in Scarlet (1887)
Jack Irish	Peter Temple	Bad Debts (1996)
Jessica Jones	Brian Michael Bendis and Michael Gaydos	Alias (Comic Book) (2001); Jessica Jones (TV) (2015)
Kemal Kayankaya	Jakob Arjouni	Happy Birthday, Türke! (1985); English translation: Happy Birthday, Turk! (1994)
Patrick Kenzie	Dennis Lehane	A Drink Before the War (1994)
Arthur Lemming	Monty Python	Monty Python's Flying Circus - "Owl Stretching Time" (TV) (1969)
Miss Madelyn Mack	Hugh C. Weir	"The Problem of the Eliminated Bridegroom" (1909)
Trent Malloy; Carlos Sandoval	Albert S. Ruddy & Leslie Greif and Paul Haggis and Christopher Canaan	Walker, Texas Ranger (TV) (1997)
Thomas Magnum	Donald P. Bellisario and Glen A. Larson	Magnum, P.I. (TV) (1980)
Joe Mannix	Richard Levinson and William Link	Mannix (TV) (1967)
Frank Marker	Roger Marshall and Anthony Marriott	Public Eye (TV) (1965)
Philip Marlowe	Raymond Chandler	The Big Sleep (1939); Murder, My Sweet (Film) (1944)
Miss Jane Marple	Agatha Christie	"The Tuesday Night Club" (1927)
Hemlock Marreau	Robert Farrow	Marreau and the Chocolate Policeman (1991)
Veronica Mars; Keith Mars	Rob Thomas	Veronica Mars (TV) (2004)
Mitin Masi	Suchitra Bhattacharya	Pālābāra Patha Nē'i
Travis McGee	John D. MacDonald	The Deep Blue Good-by (1964)
Kinsey Millhone	Sue Grafton	"A" Is for Alibi (1982)
Tess Monaghan	Laura Lippman	Baltimore Blues (1997)
Adrian Monk	Andy Breckman	Monk (TV) (2002)
Bhaduri Moshai	Nirendranath Chakravarty	
Tex Murphy	Chris Jones	Mean Streets (Video Game) (2004)
Mr. Nadgett	Charles Dickens	Martin Chuzzlewit. He was the first fictional private investigator
Nameless Detective	Bill Pronzini	The Snatch (1971)
Harry Orwell	Howard Rodman	Harry O (TV) (1974)
Hercule Poirot	Agatha Christie	The Mysterious Affair at Styles (1920)
Ellery Queen	Frederic Dannay and Manfred Bennington Lee	The Roman Hat Mystery (1929)
Agatha Raisin	M.C. Beaton	Agatha Raisin and the Quiche of Death (1992)
Precious Ramotswe	Alexander McCall Smith	The No. 1 Ladies' Detective Agency (1998)
Jeff Randall	Dennis Spooner	Randall and Hopkirk (Deceased) (TV) (1969)
Sunny Randall	Robert B. Parker	Family Honor (1999)
Ezekiel "Easy" Rawlins	Walter Mosley	Devil in a Blue Dress (1990)
Jim Rockford	Richard T. Heffron	The Rockford Files (TV) (1974)
Kiriti Roy	Nihar Ranjan Gupta	Kalo Bhramar (1930s)
Matthew Scudder	Lawrence Block	The Sins of the Fathers (1976)
John Shaft	Ernest Tidyman	Shaft (1970)
Eddie Shoestring	Robert Banks Stewart and Richard Harris	Shoestring (TV) (1979)
Sam Spade	Dashiell Hammett	The Maltese Falcon (1930); The Maltese Falcon (Film) (1931)
Shawn Spencer	Steve Franks and Andy Berman	Psych (TV) (2006)
Spenser	Robert B. Parker	The Godwulf Manuscript (1973)
Larry "Doc" Sportello	Thomas Pynchon	Inherent Vice (2009)
Johnny Staccato	Everett Chambers, producer	Johnny Staccato (TV) (1959)
Juno Steel	Harley Takagi Kaner and Kevin Vibert	The Penumbra Podcast (2016)
Cormoran Strike	Robert Galbraith	"The Cuckoo's Calling" (2013) "Strike" (TV) (2017)
Three Investigators	Robert Arthur Jr.	The Secret of Terror Castle (1964)
Tommy and Tuppence	Agatha Christie	The Secret Adversary (1922)
Amos Walker	Loren D. Estleman	Motor City Blue (1980)
V. I. Warshawski	Sara Paretsky	Indemnity Only (1982)
Nero Wolfe	Rex Stout	Fer-de-Lance (1934)
