= Torn Apart =

Torn Apart can refer to:

- "Torn Apart" (Enter Shikari song), a 2015 single by British band Enter Shikari
- "Torn Apart" (Bastille song), a 2014 single by British band Bastille featuring GRADES
- "Torn Apart" (Snoop Lion song), a 2013 promotional single by American singer Snoop Lion featuring Rita Ora
- Torn Apart (novel), 2010 crime novel by Australian author Peter Corris
- "Torn Apart", a 1998 song by Stabbing Westward from Darkest Days
- Torn Apart (album), a 2005 album by Australian band Area-7
- Torn Apart (film), a 1996 machinima film
- Torn Apart: The Life of Ian Curtis, a 2006 biography of Ian Curtis of Joy Division by Mick Middles and Lindsay Reade
- Torn Apart: The Internment Diary of Mary Kobayashi, Vancouver, British Columbia, 1941, a 2012 novel in the Dear Canada series
- The Walking Dead: Torn Apart, a 2011 web series based on the TV series The Walking Dead
