= 1915 in Australian literature =

This article presents a list of the historical events and publications of Australian literature during 1915.

== Novels ==
- Arthur H. Adams – Grocer Greatheart: A Tropical Romance
- Mary Grant Bruce — From Billabong to London
- James Francis Dwyer
  - Breath of the Jungle
  - The Green Half-Moon
- Sumner Locke – Skeeter Farm Takes a Spell
- Rosa Praed – Lady Bridget in the Never-Never Land: A Story of Australian Life
- Katharine Susannah Prichard – The Pioneers
- Ethel Turner – The Cub: Six Months in His Life: A Story in War-Time
- Lilian Turner – War's Heart Throbs

== Short stories ==
- Vance Palmer – The World of Men
- Arthur Wright – A Sport from Hollowlog Flat

== Poetry ==
- Zora Cross – "A Song of Mother Love"
- C. J. Dennis
  - "Ginger Mick"
  - The Songs of a Sentimental Bloke
  - "The Stones of Gosh"
- Mabel Forrest
  - The Green Harper
  - "Wounded Soldiers"
- Henry Lawson
  - My Army, O, My Army! and Other Songs
  - "Song of the Dardanelles"
- Hugh McCrae – "Colombine"
- John Shaw Neilson – "The Loving Tree"
- Will H. Ogilvie – "The Australian"
- A. B. Paterson – "The Mountain Squatter"
- Vance Palmer – "Homecoming"
- Bertram Stevens – A Book of Australian Verse for Boys and Girls ed.

== Births ==
A list, ordered by date of birth (and, if the date is either unspecified or repeated, ordered alphabetically by surname) of births in 1915 of Australian literary figures, authors of written works or literature-related individuals follows, including year of death.

- 3 March – Manning Clark, historian (died 1991)
- 21 April – John Manifold, poet (died 1985)
- 5 May – T. A. G. Hungerford, poet and novelist (died 2011)
- 28 May – Dorothy Auchterlonie Green, academic, literary critic and poet (born in England)(died 1991)
- 30 May – Michael Thwaites, poet and intelligence officer (died 2005)
- 31 May – Judith Wright, poet (died 2000)
- 6 July – Elizabeth Durack, artist and writer (died 2000)
- 16 July – David Campbell, poet (died 1979)
- 6 September – Don Charlwood, writer (died 2012)
- 22 October – Mona Brand, playwright and poet (died 2007)
- 22 December – David Martin, poet (born in Hungary) (died 1997)
- 23 December – Wynne Whiteford, sf writer (died 2002)

== Deaths ==
A list, ordered by date of death (and, if the date is either unspecified or repeated, ordered alphabetically by surname) of deaths in 1915 of Australian literary figures, authors of written works or literature-related individuals follows, including year of birth.

- 11 March – Rolf Boldrewood, novelist (born 1826 in England)
- 11 October – Menie Parkes, poet and short story writer (born 1839)
- 14 November – Cornelius Moynihan, poet and librarian (born 1862 in Ireland)

== See also ==
- 1915 in Australia
- 1915 in literature
- 1915 in poetry
- List of years in Australian literature
- List of years in literature
