= Torn Apart (novel) =

2010 crime novel by Australian writer Peter Corris

- Author: Peter Corris
- Language: English
- Series: Cliff Hardy
- Genre: Crime fiction
- Publisher: Allen and Unwin
- Publication date: 1 January 2010
- Publication place: Australia
- Media type: Print
- Pages: 252
- ISBN: 9781742375366
- Preceded by: Deep Water
- Followed by: Follow the Money

Torn Apart is 2010 Australian crime novel by Peter Corris.

It was the twenty-eighth novel, and thirty-fifth book, featuring the author's continuing character Cliff Hardy.

== Synopsis ==
Hardy meets his cousin, Patrick Molloy, for the first time, noting the uncanny resemblance between the two. Molloy convinces Hardy to join him on a tour of Ireland, but on their return, Molloy is murdered in Hardy's apartment and no-one is sure which cousin was the actual target.

== Critical reception ==
Publishers Weekly called the novel "unimpressive", noting that "the stale plot isn't redeemed by either compelling prose or gripping characters."

In a contrary view Sue Turnbull, in The Sydney Morning Herald, found the plot is, "as usual, elegantly executed and aesthetically satisfying. Whatever else may have changed, Torn Apart confirms that Hardy is still, and always, a class act."

== See also ==
- 2010 in Australian literature
