= Beware of the Dog (disambiguation) =

Beware of the dog refers to a warning sign indicating that a dangerous dog is within.

Beware of the dog or beware of dog may also refer to:

== Literature ==
- Beware of the Dog (novel), a 1992 crime fiction novel by Peter Corris
- "Beware of the Dog" (short story), a short story by Roald Dahl

== Music ==
- Beware of Dog (album), an album by Lil Bow Wow
- Beware of the Dogs, 2019 album by Stella Donnelly
- Beware of The Dogs (The Dogs album), 1991
- Beware of the Dog!, an album by Hound Dog Taylor
- "Beware of the Dog" (song), a song by Jamelia
- "Beware of the Dog", the B-side to "The Ballad of Bonnie and Clyde" by Georgie Fame

== TV and entertainment ==
- "Beware of the Dog" (Millennium), a season two episode of Millennium
- Beware of Dog (TV series), an American sitcom
- In Your House 8: Beware of Dog, a WWE pay-per-view event
- Beware of Dogs, a 2014 Indian film
