= Cliff Hardy (character) =

Cliff Hardy is a fictional Australian private eye created by Peter Corris. He was first introduced in the 1980 novel The Dying Trade and featured in over 40 novels and short story collections. He was played by Bryan Brown in the 1983 film The Empty Beach.

Corris later recalled:

It was really just to imitate Raymond Chandler and Ross Macdonald and see if I could. I’d tried a historical novel based on my PHD thesis and about 18 different publishers rejected it. So I had this idea. I’d been reading Chandler and MacDonald recreationally for years, and I thought, well, I’d try this. I felt like I really knew how they worked and what the formula was like and what changes you could make. I thought, Sydney, San Francisco, LA, I felt like there was a symbiosis there and figured, have a go at what you know you can write. Imitation was the stimulus. But after a few books, I felt I had an individual voice and the confidence to play around with the formula, say what I wanted to say, shit on people I wanted to shit on, things like that, so it took off creatively after a very imitative start, you might say.

Corris felt the character became more unique around the time of The Empty Beach.

== Background ==
Introduced in The Dying Trade, Hardy had served during the Malayan Emergency, studied and university and worked as an insurance investigator.

He grew up in Maroubra and his mother was an alcoholic. Hardy has a house in Glebe and his tenant is a university student Hilde.

Corris said "I don’t do a lot of documentary or physical research. The ideas come from my own life, my imagination and what’s around, what’s in the newspaper, what I hear on the radio or see on TV, what friends tell me, you know, just the basics of the life around you."

== Screen Depictions ==
Hardy has been played by the following actors:

- Robert Menzies in a 1993 documentary about Corris
- Bryan Brown in the 1985 film The Empty Beach
- John Sheerin who voiced Hardy in a 1983 radio adaptation of The Empty Beach.

When asked about other actors who could play Hardy, Corris felt Simon Westaway, who played Peter Faithful in Phoenix, "would have been a very good Hardy. Hardy is a big, dark guy, bit of a hooked nose, hard look to him, but funny." Corris says Paul Hogan was once suggested, "and I thought, well, if you were going to go funny and quirky, well, not my first choice but I wouldn’t have set my mind against it if the money was right." However in 2013 he stated "if I had a choice, Russell Crowe. Right age, looks right, looking a bit knocked about, bloody good actor, and all he needs to do is just look… doesn’t need to say very much."

== Appearances ==
- The Dying Trade (McGraw-Hill, 1980); ISBN 0-070-7292-8X
- White Meat (Sydney, Pan Books, 1981); ISBN 0-330-27018-4
- The Marvellous Boy (Sydney, Pan Books, 1982); ISBN 0-330-27019-2
- The Empty Beach (Sydney, Allen & Unwin, 1983); ISBN 0-86861-229-4
- Heroin Annie and Other Cliff Hardy Stories (Sydney, Allen & Unwin, 1984); ISBN 0-86861-399-1 (short stories)
- Make Me Rich (Sydney, Allen & Unwin, 1985); ISBN 0-86861-660-5
- The Big Drop, and Other Cliff Hardy Stories (Sydney, Allen & Unwin, 1985); ISBN 0-86861-767-9 (short stories)
- The Greenwich Apartments (Sydney, Allen & Unwin, 1986); ISBN 0-04-820030-1
- Deal Me Out (Sydney, Allen & Unwin, 1986); ISBN 0-86861-978-7
- The January Zone (Sydney, Allen & Unwin, 1987); ISBN 0-04-200050-5
- Man in the Shadows : A Short Novel and Six Stories (Sydney, Allen & Unwin, 1988); ISBN 0-04-320226-8 (short stories)
- O'Fear (Sydney, Bantam, 1990); ISBN 0-947189-73-4
- Wet Graves (Sydney, Bantam, 1991); ISBN 1-86359-025-0
- Aftershock (Sydney, Bantam, 1991); ISBN 1-86359-028-5
- Beware of the Dog (Sydney, Bantam, 1992); ISBN 1-86359-054-4
- Burn, and Other Stories (Sydney, Bantam, 1993); ISBN 1-86359-069-2 (short stories)
- Matrimonial Causes (Sydney, Bantam, 1993); ISBN 1-86359-077-3
- Casino (Sydney, Bantam, 1994); ISBN 1-86359-113-3
- The Washington Club (Sydney, Bantam, 1997); ISBN 0-7338-0031-9
- Forget Me If You Can: Cliff Hardy Stories (Sydney, Bantam, 1997); ISBN 0-7338-0066-1 (short stories)
- The Reward (Sydney, Bantam, 1997); ISBN 0-7338-0070-X
- The Black Prince (Sydney, Bantam, 1998); ISBN 1-86325-132-4
- The Other Side of Sorrow (Sydney, Bantam, 1999); ISBN 1-86325-185-5
- Lugarno (Sydney, Bantam, 2001); ISBN 1-86325-298-3
- Salt and Blood (Sydney, Bantam, 2002); ISBN 1-86325-374-2
- Master's Mates (Sydney, Allen & Unwin, 2003); ISBN 1-74114-136-2
- The Coast Road (Sydney, Allen & Unwin, 2004); ISBN 1-74114-384-5
- Taking Care of Business: Cliff Hardy Cases (Sydney, Allen & Unwin, 2004); ISBN 1-74114-419-1 (short stories)
- Saving Billie (Sydney, Allen & Unwin, 2005); ISBN 1-74115-621-1
- The Undertow (Sydney, Allen & Unwin, 2006); ISBN 978-1-74114-748-3
- Appeal Denied (Sydney, Allen & Unwin, 2007); ISBN 978-1-74175-096-6
- The Big Score: Cliff Hardy Cases (Sydney, Allen & Unwin, 2007); ISBN 978-1-74175-223-6 (short stories)
- Open File (Sydney, Allen & Unwin, 2008); ISBN 978-1-74175-417-9
- Deep Water (Sydney, Allen & Unwin, 2009); ISBN 978-1-74175-677-7
- Torn Apart (Sydney, Allen & Unwin, 2010); ISBN 978-1-74237-536-6
- Follow the Money (Sydney, Allen & Unwin, 2011); ISBN 978-1-74237-379-9
- Comeback (Sydney, Allen & Unwin, 2012); ISBN 978-1-74237-724-7
- The Dunbar Case (Sydney, Allen & Unwin, 2013); ISBN 978-1-74331-022-9
- Silent Kill (Sydney, Allen & Unwin, 2014); ISBN 978-1-74331-637-5
- Gun Control (Sydney, Allen & Unwin, 2015); ISBN 978-1-76011-206-6
- That Empty Feeling (Sydney, Allen & Unwin, 2016); ISBN 978-1-76011-207-3
- Win, Lose or Draw (Sydney, Allen & Unwin, 2017); ISBN 978-1-76029-478-6

=== Films ===
- The Empty Beach (1985)
