= Win, Lose or Draw (novel) =

2017 crime novel by Australian writer Peter Corris

- First edition (publ. Allen & Unwin)
- Author: Peter Corris
- Language: English
- Series: Cliff Hardy
- Genre: Crime fiction
- Publisher: Allen and Unwin
- Publication date: 3 January 2017
- Publication place: Australia
- Media type: Print
- Pages: 256
- ISBN: 9781952535840
- Preceded by: That Empty Feeling
- Followed by: -

Win, Lose or Draw is a 2017 crime fiction novel by Australian writer Peter Corris.

It was the thirty-seventh novel, and the forty-second and last book, featuring the author's continuing character Cliff Hardy.

== Synopsis ==
Hardy is engaged to look for a rich businessman's daughter who has gone missing. His search will take him to Norfolk Island, Coolangatta and Byron Bay and into a world of drugs, yachts and the sex trade.

== Critical reception ==
Sue Turnbull, in The Sydney Morning Herald noted some similaties between this book and Corris's first in the series, The Dying Trade. She concluded: 'Slipping into the pages of Win, Lose or Draw feels like a kind of homecoming, touched with the sadness of knowing the beloved occupants are about to move on. But then there's the knowledge that there are 41 books to revisit, offering a fascinating account of where we have been. Vale Cliff Hardy and thanks for the ride."

Writing in The Newtown Review of Books reviewer Tom Patterson noted "It's a tough decision, when to retire. Go too early and good work is missed. Too late and there is the awful spectacle of a writer dying twice. That there is a small decline in Win, Lose or Draw doesn't detract from what has come before it. If anything, it just throws into relief how good the others are and how difficult it is to make something so hard look effortless."
