= The Georges' Wife =

1993 novel by Australian writer Elizabeth Jolley

- Author: Elizabeth Jolley
- Language: English
- Series: Vera Wright
- Genre: Fiction
- Publisher: Viking
- Publication date: 1993
- Publication place: Australia
- Media type: Print
- Pages: 182 pp.
- ISBN: 0670852651
- Preceded by: Cabin Fever
- Followed by: The Orchard Thieves

The Georges' Wife (1993) is a novel by Australian writer Elizabeth Jolley. It was originally published by Viking in Australia in 1993.

The novel was the third in the author's Vera Wright trilogy, along with My Father's Moon (1989) and Cabin Fever (1990).

== Synopsis ==
With one child in tow Vera Wright goes to live with Eleanor and Oliver George, becoming maid to one and mistress to the other.

== Critical reception ==
Writing in The Canberra Times Moira Najdecki noted: "The Georges' Wife, from the opening chapter to the last lines, is a wonderful treat. Elizabeth Jolley, in her inimitable fashion, insinuates her readers into the continuing life and liaisons of the gauche and trusting Vera, whose early experiences have been recounted in My Father's Moon and its sequel, Cabin Fever...The Georges' Wife is ineffably sad but also very funny. Ultimately, Vera survives. Her uncomplicated and pragmatic nature means that she can rise above hurt and disappointment and appreciate life's smorgasbord of experiences."

In LiNQ, the literature journal of the University of North Queensland, Lettie Hopkins writes: "Elizabeth Jolley here explores life in the margins, and within this, the nature of families, their reconstruction and their dislocations; the nature of mothering; the power of the father; the nature of cultural reproduction and the breaking of taboos; the innocence of uninhibited passions versus the adherence to social conventions; the role of the imagination in recreating memory and in creating identity; the relationship between the real and the imagined, and further, the multiplicity of realities; the power of the word and the power of the sign, and the oscillation and fluctuation between the two; the value and dissolution of boundaries."

== Publication history ==
After its original publication in 1993 in Australia by publisher Viking the novel was later reprinted as follows:

- Penguin, Australia, 1994 and 2008

== Awards ==
The novel won the Age Book of the Year Award for Fiction (or Imaginative Writing) in 1993.

== See also ==
- 1993 in Australian literature
