= The Best Australian Poetry 2007 =

- Editor: John Tranter
- Language: English
- Series: The Best Australian Poetry
- Genre: Anthology
- Published: 2007 (University of Queensland Press)
- Publication place: Australia
- Media type: Print paperback
- Pages: 156 pp
- ISBN: 978-0-7022-3607-5

The Best Australian Poetry 2007 is an anthology of poetry published by UQP in 2007. The series editors are Bronwyn Lea and Martin Duwell; the guest editor for the 2007 anthology was John Tranter.

The selected poems were drawn from the following Australian literary magazines: The Australian Book Review, Blast magazine, Blue Dog, Famous Reporter, Going Down Swinging, Heat, Hecate, Meanjin, Southerly, Space: New Writing, and the Weekend Australian.

The 40 contributors are:

- Robert Adamson
- Judith Bishop
- Pam Brown
- Joanne Burns
- Grant Caldwell
- Chris Edwards
- Michael Farrell
- Barbara Fisher
- Dennis Foley
- Alison Gerber
- Jennifer Harrison
- Dominique Hecq
- Matt Hetherington
- Charles Higham
- Clive James
- Mary Jenkins
- Jill Jones
- S. K. Kelen
- Cath Kenneally
- John Kinsella
- Cameron Lowe
- David McCooey
- Jennifer Maiden
- Graeme Miles
- John Millett
- Pooja Mittal
- Reg Mombassa
- Les Murray
- Louise Nicholas
- Ouyang Yu
- Geoff Page
- Megan Petrie
- Craig Powell
- Michael Riley
- Peter Rose
- Brendan Ryan
- Tracy Ryan
- Michael Sharkey
- Chris Wallace-Crabbe
- Dennis Wild

== Reception ==
The poet Barry Hill wrote, "The format of the UQP book is excellent for anyone interested in how poets work and think. A note from the poet accompanies each poem, which is intrinsically interesting as well as a contribution to our literary history." The Sydney Morning Herald critic Richard King stated, "Prose poems, whimsical lineation and other experiments in form abound, as do references to the act of writing and, of course, to language itself."

Lyn McCredden penned a positive review, writing, "The collection is indeed far more interesting than that spectral polarity might indicate, for Tranter manages an almost erotic weaving between the artiness and textual play of poetry, and poetry's claim to transcend mere aesthetics, to speak from the very centre(s) of human experience. Hence, this anthology's multitude of voices shuttle and probe between the claims of content and form, life lived and life turned into art." Antipodes's G. Burns Cooper praised the book, stating, "Overall, this slim volume, while uneven, is well worth reading, whether for a sense of the state of the poetic art Down Under, or simply for the pleasure of words."

== See also ==
- 2007 in poetry
- Best American Poetry series
- Best New Zealand Poems series
