= The Empty Beach =

- Directed by: Chris Thomson
- Written by: Keith Dewhurst
- Based on: The Empty Beach by Peter Corris
- Produced by: John Edwards; Tim Read
- Starring: Bryan Brown; John Wood
- Cinematography: John Seale
- Edited by: Lindsay Frazer
- Music by: Martin Armiger; Red Symons
- Production company: Jethro Films Pty Ltd
- Distributed by: Hoyts
- Release date: 12 September 1985 (Australia)
- Running time: 89 minutes
- Country: Australia
- Language: English
- Budget: A$1.8 million
- Box office: AU $34,341 (Australia)

The Empty Beach is a 1985 Australian thriller film based on the 1983 novel of the same name by Peter Corris, starring Bryan Brown as private investigator Cliff Hardy.

== Premise ==
Cliff Hardy inquires into the disappearance of a beautiful woman's wealthy husband from Bondi Beach.

== Cast ==
- Bryan Brown as Cliff Hardy
- Anna Maria Monticelli as Anne Winter
- Belinda Giblin as Marion Singer
- Ray Barrett as McLean
- John Wood as Parker
- Peter Collingwood as Ward
- Nick Tate as Brian Henneberry
- Kerry Mack as Hildegard
- Joss McWilliam as Tal
- Sally Cooper as Sandy Modesto
- Rhys McConnochie as Garth Green
- Steve Rackman as Rex
- Robert Alexander as Bob
- Bob Barrett as Johnno
- Christopher Lewis as Aldo
- Steve J. Spears as Manny
- Kerry Dwyer as Mary Mahoud
- Dean Nottle as Mercer
- Robert Noble as Pinball Manager
- Simone Taylor as Sharon
- Harry Lawrence as Leon
- Alexander Hay as Edgar Montefiore
- Philomena Loneragan as Peggy
- Peggy Wallach as Rose
- Brian Anderson as Clyde
- Deborah Kennedy as Newspaper Librarian
- Robert Shannon as Detective
- John Godden as Detective's Victim
- Rebecca Smart as Little Girl
- Aaron Smart as Little Boy
- Kelly Dingwall as Head Punk
- Barry Leane as John Singer
- Phillip Ross as Bill Winter

== Development ==
The original novel was the fourth in the Cliff Hardy series. It was very successful for an Australian book, selling out its initial run of 7,000 copies with another 5,000 issued. (Hardy books typically wound up selling 10,000 copies and The Empty Beach would sell 30,000.)

The novel was adapted for radio on the ABC in 1983.

In the early 1980s Bryan Brown was attached to star as Cliff Hardy in an adaptation of an earlier Corris novel, White Meat. This was to be adapted by Corris, directed by Stephen Wallace and produced by Richard Mason. However no film eventuated. Corris wrote a draft and they applied for funding. According to Corris, "one of the assessors said something like, 'This is the nastiest script I’ve ever read'. The result: no funding."

Several years later producers Tim Read and John Edwards bought an option to The Empty Beach and wanted to make a film starring Bryan Brown as Cliffy Hardy. Bob Weis was attached as executive producer. Weis said "The film was a stepping stone towards trying to make a genre picture work in Australia without being dominated by the history of that kind of movie, a history that's so strongly American."

"It seemed a perfect fit," wrote Corris. "I was contracted to write a script with the producers having an opt-out clause if unsatisfied. I wrote a script which they deemed 'too soft'; I wrote another which they said was 'too hard'. Sandra Levy was then brought in and we wrote a script together. John Edwards said, 'Peter, this is almost there!’ The next I heard, they’d exercised the clause and brought in a new scriptwriter. This was Keith Dewhurst who'd written scripts for the British TV series Z Cars. Good choice, I thought and went overseas, adopting the Hemingway philosophy – take the money and run."

Corris told David Stratton, "I wasn't too upset" by Dewhurst being hired. "I knew I was inexperienced and that the script wasn't right. I thought putting a pro on the job was a good idea and I'd have been happy with a joint credit." Bob Weis says he and director Chris Thomson worked on Keith Dewhurst's final draft.

Corris later said "I believe the script missed the point of the book." He said "I thought it was silly... I hated the water death, the car chase, and Bondi Pavilion shoot out scenes." He also disliked the emphasis on missing tapes. "The story is about deceit. Marion Singer's deceiving of Hardy, her deception of the crimes, their deception of each other and maybe John Singer's deceiving of Marion. Deception is more interesting than tapes." Corris said his book was about deception but the filmmakers wanted "tapes, and corruption and investigations – and they got their way".

Corris added, "there should have been voiceover, if there’d been some voiceover from him to give you an idea what he was thinking instead of that very stoic look he had, I think it might have even redeemed the bad script. Otherwise, no, I think I got shitty and went overseas. I wasn’t present for the shooting."

Director Chris Thomson said Hardy "is inuitive, impulsive and with a healthy old fashioned morality of right and wrong. He usually leads with his chin and walks deliberately into trouble."

== Production ==
Filming started 8 October 1984 at Elizabeth Bay and mostly took place around Bondi. John Seale made the film after Witness.

According to Corris, "Bryan Brown was good, perhaps too good. I heard later that some of the cast were so overawed by him they gave lame performances. The director, Chris Thompson, and Brown were said to have been at odds. The female lead, supposed to be whippet-thin and feisty, was so when cast but was pregnant by the time of shooting and wore enveloping garments."

According to David Stratton, Thomson also clashed with cinematographer John Seale throughout the shoot.

However, when Corris saw a rough cut of 94 minutes he "impressed. I still dislikled a lot of it but I thought Bryan was good and I liked John Wood." Corris says when he saw the final film, reduced to 89 minutes, "dismay was back. I liked the opening song but the wink at the nuns now looked cliched and dumb. All the effects striven for were old hat, done often before stuff. I still hated the 'stand out' scenes (water ski murder, car chase, shoot out) and the tapes. I still liked Bryan...[but] I thought it was a mess."

== Music ==
To coincide with the film release the film's title song was released as a single that summer of 1985 by Marc Hunter (of Dragon) with backing vocals featured from Canadian-Australian based singer Wendy Matthews. Music video of the single also had some moderate TV airplay which features both Marc Hunter and Wendy Matthews.

== Release ==
The film performed poorly at the box office in Australia, Jonathan Chissick of Hoyts calling it "an absolute disaster". Corris said "Cruelly, but accurately, a young person I knew declared that its title should have been The Empty Cinema." He stated "the film was a failure, a terrible flop" but added "the movie played in the cinemas for a while, it played on TV, it was a video in the shops for quite a long time and it helped to stimulate the book, which went through three or four editions so the whole thing did give me a kick along... I got a bounce out of the movie."

Bob Weis said "the film was seen all over the world. It had a known film star in the lead so it travelled very easily."

There were plans for Brown to appear in further Hardy adventures but this did not eventuate. While Corris hoped Bryan Brown would come back as Hardy he wanted a less craggy portrayal of Hardy. "I'd like to warm him up more."

Ten network first screened the feature film at 8.30pm in early October 1986 on a Wednesday night with a repeat screening again in early 1990s at a much later time-slot and has not screened commercially since.

=== Critical reception ===
Filmnews wrote "Peter Corris' modest narrative line in the original novel has been literally blown out by Keith Dewhurst's screenplay, and the result is an incomprehensible farrago of plots, subplots, and characters, linked by private detective Cliff Hardy's mood riffs – this consists of Bryan Brown looking, by turns, quizzical, worldweary or pissed off – and punctuated by set piece confrontations with big city corruption, monumental in symbolism but cryptic in significance."

The Canberra Times called it "a breath of fresh air to blow away the dust that has settled on the private-eye genre during too many decades of too many bland, inane TV pot-boilers."

David Stratton felt the 94 minute version was more successful than the final 89 minute version which "speeds by at a pace which is occasionally too fast to take in" though he felt Brown "is the perfect Cliff Hardy: cynical, witty, tough and resourceful."

There have been a number of attempts over the years to revive the character, including a television series, and a film starring Paul Hogan, but as of 2012 no other Cliff Hardy story had been dramatised for screen.

== Legacy ==
In 2013, Corris said about the film: "Ratshit movie. Terrible film. But the money enabled me to put a deposit on a house. My stand-up comedy line is that I much preferred the house to the film."
