= Deal Me Out (novel) =

1986 crime novel by Australian writer Peter Corris

- Author: Peter Corris
- Language: English
- Series: Cliff Hardy
- Genre: Crime fiction
- Publisher: Allen and Unwin
- Publication date: 1986
- Publication place: Australia
- Media type: Print
- Pages: 191
- ISBN: 0868619787
- Preceded by: The Greenwich Apartments
- Followed by: The January Zone

Deal Me Out is a 1986 Australian novel by Peter Corris.

It was the seventh novel, and ninth book, featuring the author's continuing character Cliff Hardy.

== Synopsis ==
Cliff Hardy is hired by a friend to investigate a gang of car thieves. This leads him to looking for William Mountain, someone Hardy has never liked due to his boozy violent ways.

== Critical reception ==
Stephen Knight, in The Sydney Morning Herald called the novel "a very accomplished crime story." He continued: "In this, Corris recapitulates with new force the form of previous novels. But he adds a deeper register by refracting the whole criminal plot though the ideas and obsessions of a largely offstage central character, a brilliant but wayward writer. This subtle and highly effective idea is technically quite complex, but it's handled with complete assurance. Craft and analytical confidence seem to be deepening together."

The Canberra Times wrote "Corris keeps on improving. This story is as tight and tough as any he has written. Experience drafting short stories has honed Corris's talent in writing sharp, punchy chapters."

== Publishing history ==
After the novel's initial publication in 1986, it was reprinted as follows:

- Ballantine Books, USA, 1988

The novel was also translated into Swedish in 1988 and French in 2010.

== See also ==
- 1986 in Australian literature
