= Make Me Rich =

1985 crime novel by Australian writer Peter Corris

- First edition (publ. Allen & Unwin)
- Author: Peter Corris
- Language: English
- Series: Cliff Hardy
- Genre: Crime fiction
- Publisher: Allen and Unwin
- Publication date: 1985
- Publication place: Australia
- Media type: Print
- Pages: 186
- ISBN: 0868616605
- Preceded by: Heroin Annie and Other Cliff Hardy Stories
- Followed by: The Big Drop, and Other Cliff Hardy Stories

Make Me Rich is a 1985 crime fiction novel by Australian writer Peter Corris.

It was the fifth novel, and the sixth book, featuring the author's continuing character Cliff Hardy.

== Synopsis ==
When he is engaged to look after security at a swanky Vaucluse party Hardy meets Paul Guthrie who wants him to look for his stepson Ray. Hardy's search will centre on Kings Cross, on criminals with strong political protection and vicious killers and ex-cops.

== Critical reception ==
Reviewing the novel for The Sydney Morning Herald L. V. Kepert concluded that "Peter Corris is a master of his chosen subject. The style is careful, the settings exact and the scenes of violence and suspense skilfully built up. The touch of crime as big business is just enough to reassure Sydney readers that they are on home ground."

== Publishing history ==
After the novel's initial publication in Australia in 1985 it was reprinted as follows:

- Ballantine Books, USA, 1987
- Allen and Unwin, Australia, 2014

It was also translated into French in 1992.

== Notes ==
- Shortly after the publication of the novel Peter Corris was interviewed by Peter Fuller for The Canberra Times.
