= The Marvellous Boy (novel) =

1982 crime novel by Australian writer Peter Corris

- Author: Peter Corris
- Language: English
- Series: Cliff Hardy
- Genre: Crime fiction
- Publisher: Allen and Unwin
- Publication date: 1982
- Publication place: Australia
- Media type: Print
- Pages: 176
- ISBN: 0330270192
- Preceded by: White Meat
- Followed by: The Empty Beach

The Marvellous Boy is a 1982 Australian crime novel by Peter Corris.

It was the third novel featuring the author's continuing character Cliff Hardy.

== Plot synopsis ==
Cliff Hardy is hired by the matriarch of a wealthy family to track down a long-lost heir.

== Critical reception ==
"Marvellous for the boys who like tough guy fiction," wrote the Sydney Morning Herald.

"Corris keeps tension high" wrote The Age.

The Canberra Times wrote "there is hope that when Hardy stops being a reasonable facsimile of police roundsmen I have known and gets more into his detective role he'll be a good one."

== Publication history ==
After the novel's initial publication by Allen and Unwin in Australia in 1982, it was reprinted as follows:

- Ballantine Books, USA, 1986 (with title The Marvelous Boy)
- Allen and Unwin, Australia, 2014

The novel was also translated into French in 1989, and German in 1991 and 1995.

== See also ==
- 1982 in Australian literature
