= Matrimonial Causes =

1993 crime novel by Australian writer Peter Corris

- Author: Peter Corris
- Language: English
- Series: Cliff Hardy
- Genre: Crime fiction
- Publisher: Allen and Unwin
- Publication date: 1993
- Publication place: Australia
- Media type: Print
- Pages: 196
- ISBN: 1863590773
- Preceded by: Burn, and Other Stories
- Followed by: Casino

Matrimonial Causes is 1993 Australian crime novel by Peter Corris.

It was the thirteenth novel, and seventeenth book, featuring the author's continuing character Cliff Hardy.

== Synopsis ==
While on vacation with his latest girlfiend Hardy tells her about his very first case back in the 1970s. It seemed like a simple divorce case. Hardy was working for a solicitor representing the wife, and his job was to dig the dirt on the husband. But when the husband is shot leaving a building with his new "girlfriend" Hardy finds himself in a fight for his own survival.

== Critical reception ==
Susan Gleason, in a short review of the novel in The Sydney Morning Herald, noted it had "Lots of Sydney colour, clean lines, good plot."

== Publication history ==
After the novel's initial publication in 1993, it was reprinted as follows:

- Dell Books, USA, 1988
- Allen & Unwin, Australia, 2014

== See also ==
- 1993 in Australian literature
