= O'Fear =

1990 crime novel by Australian writer Peter Corris

- Author: Peter Corris
- Language: English
- Series: Cliff Hardy
- Genre: Crime fiction
- Publisher: Allen and Unwin
- Publication date: 1990
- Publication place: Australia
- Media type: Print
- Pages: 218
- ISBN: 0947189734
- Preceded by: Man in the Shadows : A Short Novel and Six Stories
- Followed by: Wet Graves

O'Fear is 1990 Australian crime novel by Peter Corris.

It was the ninth novel, and twelfth book, featuring the author's continuing character Cliff Hardy.

It was the first Hardy novel after a break of a few years.

The novel was read out on ABC radio in 1990 with John Derum as Hardy and Linda Cropper as Felicia Todd.

== Synopsis ==
An old drinking buddy of Cliff's, Todd Barnes, is killed in a car accident, or so it seems. After the death Hardy discovers he has been left $10,000 by Barnes to find his killer.

== Critical reception ==
Bill Turner, in The Sydney Morning Herald, called it "a very good, solid murder thriller." He also noted that "Cliff investigates a number of avenues, closes a number of dead-ends and is left with the truism of the genre – it's what the players don't tell you that counts."

The Chicago Tribune wrote "the writing is lively and professional but the result is a mildly engaging tale that could have happened anywhere."

== See also ==
- 1990 in Australian literature
