= Gun Control (novel) =

2015 crime novel by Australian writer Peter Corris

- Author: Peter Corris
- Language: English
- Series: Cliff Hardy
- Genre: Crime fiction
- Publisher: Allen and Unwin
- Publication date: February 2015
- Publication place: Australia
- Media type: Print
- Pages: 264
- ISBN: 9781760112066
- Preceded by: Silent Kill
- Followed by: That Empty Feeling

Gun Control is 2015 Australian crime novel by Peter Corris.

It was the thirty-third novel, and fortieth book, featuring the author's continuing character Cliff Hardy.

== Synopsis ==
Hardy is engaged by a rich businessman to find the person who gave his son a gun, the gun with which he committed suicide.

== Critical reception ==
In The Sydney Morning Herald Jeff Popple called the novel "a professional and entertaining story that quickly gathers interest as Hardy tries to untangle the various strands of the conspiracy."

Sue Turnbull, in The Brisbane Times, finds that this case, like many before it, "leads Hardy on a journey through Sydney's affluent suburbs and seedier sidestreets with excursions into the regional hinterland."

== See also ==
- 2015 in Australian literature
