= Man in the Shadows : A Short Novel and Six Stories =

1988 crime story collection by Australian writer Peter Corris

- Author: Peter Corris
- Language: English
- Series: Cliff Hardy
- Genre: Crime fiction story collection
- Publisher: Allen and Unwin
- Publication date: 1988
- Publication place: Australia
- Media type: Print
- Pages: 195
- ISBN: 0043202268
- Preceded by: The January Zone
- Followed by: O'Fear

Man in the Shadows : A Short Novel and Six Stories is a 1988 Australian collection of crime stories by Peter Corris.

It was the eleventh book, and third story collection, featuring the author's continuing character Cliff Hardy.

== Contents ==
- "Man in the Shadows" - novella
- "Cloudburst" - short story
- "High Integrity" - short story
- "Box On!" - short story
- "The Deserter" - short story
- "Byron Kelly's Big Mistake" - short story
- "Norman Mailer's Christmas" - short story

== Critical reception ==
Writing in The Canberra Times reviewer Mark Thomas called it "a hard-boiled pot-boiler... The stories represent thin, flat padding, especially one in which we are asked to believe that the army engages in clandestine operations in New Caledonia. The novel is far more enticing, and turns out to be as brisk, witty and acute as earlier Cliff Hardy stories."

In The Sydney Morning Herald Stephen Knight noted the "rather grim and resolute ending."

Ray Davie in The Age called the novella "a readable, lively story, but lacks the rich texture of some earlier Hardy yarns" and thought "the short stories are deftly done."

== Publication history ==
After the collection's initial publication in 1988, it was reprinted as follows:

- Bantam Books, USA, 1991
- Allen and Unwin, Australia, 2014

== Notes ==
In the lead-up to the publication of the collection, Corris was interviewed for The Age newspaper by Candida Baker.

== See also ==
- 1988 in Australian literature
