= The Big Drop, and Other Cliff Hardy Stories =

1985 short story collection by Australian writer Peter Corris

- Author: Peter Corris
- Language: English
- Series: Cliff Hardy
- Genre: Crime fiction story collection
- Publisher: Allen and Unwin
- Publication date: 1985
- Publication place: Australia
- Media type: Print
- Pages: 214
- ISBN: 0868617679
- Preceded by: Make Me Rich
- Followed by: The Greenwich Apartments

The Big Drop, and Other Cliff Hardy Stories is a collection of short stories by Peter Corris first published in 1985.

It was the seventh book, and second story collection, featuring the author's continuing character Cliff Hardy.

The stories had been previously published in various Australian newspapers and magazines.

== Critical reception ==
Writing in The Sydney Morning Herald James Hall commented that all the "aspects of the Hardy persona and methodology turn up in the 10 stories in The Big Drop, most of them written for the magazine market, which form a stimulating introduction to the Hardy novels. For connoisseurs they wil also confirm a growing sense of place in Corris's work: he is particuarly good in depicting Sydney's inner suburbs and tacky club world."

== Contents ==
- "The Big Drop"
- "P.I. Blues"
- "The Arms of the Law"
- "Tearaway"
- "What Would You Do?"
- "The Mongol Scroll"
- "The Mae West Scam"
- "Rhythm Track"
- "The Big Pinch"
- "Maltese Falcon"

== Publication history ==
After the collection's initial publication in Australia in 1985, it was reprinted as follows:

- Ballantine Books, USA, 1988
- Allen and Unwin, UK, 2014

The collection was also translated into French in 2001.

== See also ==
- 1985 in Australian literature
