= Burn, and Other Stories =

1993 short story collection by Australian writer Peter Corris

- First edition (publ. Allen & Unwin)
- Author: Peter Corris
- Language: English
- Series: Cliff Hardy
- Genre: Crime fiction story collection
- Publisher: Allen and Unwin
- Publication date: 1993
- Publication place: Australia
- Media type: Print
- Pages: 197
- ISBN: 1863590692
- Preceded by: Beware of the Dog
- Followed by: Matrimonial Causes

Burn, and Other Stories is a 1992 crime fiction short story by Australian writer Peter Corris.

It was the fourth story collection, and the sixteenth book, featuring the author's continuing character Cliff Hardy.

== Critical reception ==
Stan Barney, in a short review in The Canberra Times, wrote the collection "shows that Peter Corris is equally at home with the short story as he is with the novel... Well-plotted so it is not easy to guess the twist in the tail, and well-written".

== Publishing history ==
After the collection's initial publication in Australia in 1993 it was reprinted by Allen and Unwin in 2014.

== See also ==
- 1993 in Australian literature
