= That Empty Feeling =

2016 crime novel by Australian writer Peter Corris

- First edition (publ. Allen & Unwin)
- Author: Peter Corris
- Language: English
- Series: Cliff Hardy
- Genre: Crime fiction
- Publisher: Allen and Unwin
- Publication date: 2016
- Publication place: Australia
- Media type: Print
- Pages: 264
- ISBN: 9781760112073
- Preceded by: Gun Control
- Followed by: Win, Lose or Draw

That Empty Feeling is a 2016 crime fiction novel by Australian writer Peter Corris.

It was the thirty-sixth novel, and forty-first book, featuring the author's continuing character Cliff Hardy.

== Synopsis ==
An obituary of an old friend in a local newspaper causes Hardy to reminisce about a case from the 1980s that continues to haunt him.

== Critical reception ==
Writing in The Sydney Morning Herald Jeff Popple called the novel "a professional and entertaining story that quickly gathers interest as Hardy tries to untangle the various strands of the conspiracy, and in the process meets some shady characters and ably handles several violent encounters."
