= Wet Graves =

1991 crime novel by Australian writer Peter Corris

- Author: Peter Corris
- Language: English
- Series: Cliff Hardy
- Genre: Crime fiction
- Publisher: Allen and Unwin
- Publication date: 1991
- Publication place: Australia
- Media type: Print
- Pages: 242
- ISBN: 1863590250
- Preceded by: O'Fear
- Followed by: Aftershock

Wet Graves is 1990 Australian crime novel by Peter Corris.

It was the tenth novel, and thirteenth book, featuring the author's continuing character Cliff Hardy.

== Synopsis ==
The body of a murdered elderly man under the Sydney Harbour Bridge leads Hardy to a mystery that will take him back to the bridge's construction, 50 years back.

== Critical reception ==
Stephen Knight, writing in The Sydney Morning Herald considered the novel "in the best tradition of hard pulp". He continued "Skilful, serious, entertaining in a thoughtful and humane way, Wet Graves is both dry and lively. It suggests a writer settled again, in both theme and style, for a long haul with those fables of vice and virtue in contemporary Australia."

== Publication history ==
After the novel's initial publication in 1991 it was reprinted by Allen and Unwin in 2014.

== See also ==
- 1991 in Australian literature
