= The Empty Beach (novel) =

1983 crime novel by Australian writer Peter Corris

- Author: Peter Corris
- Language: English
- Series: Cliff Hardy
- Genre: Crime fiction
- Publisher: Allen and Unwin
- Publication date: 1983
- Publication place: Australia
- Media type: Print
- Pages: 163 pp.
- ISBN: 0868612294
- Preceded by: The Marvellous Boy
- Followed by: Heroin Annie and Other Cliff Hardy Stories

The Empty Beach (1983) is a novel by Australian writer Peter Corris. It was originally published by Allen and Unwin in Australia in 1983.

The novel was the fourth to feature the author's recurring character, private investigator Cliff Hardy. Corris felt this novel was when the Cliff Hardy novels went from imitative to unique.

== Synopsis ==
When a man thought to have died two years previously is spotted on a Sydney street the widow asks Hardy to investigate.

== Critical reception ==
Writing in The Canberra Times Mark Thomas noted that "Corris now wears Cliff Hardy like an old coat. His hero is down at heel but full of character, with lots of intriguing odds and ends tucked in his pockets. Hardy's luck has improved this time around. His Falcon has new seats, he is off the smokes, and his terrace has been brightened up with a chaste Baltic lodger. Hardy, though, still ends up alone and palely loitering, battered over the head by a variety of blunt instruments handled by an equally odious variety of thugs...The Empty Beach again echoes Raymond Chandler; as Jimmy Carter used to ask, why not the best? Corris' story is clever, his asides wry, his language rough but whimsical. Once more Corris captures intonations of speech and nuances in gestures adeptly; that gift (and cunning similes) are the hallmarks of a thriller craftsman."

== Publication history ==
After its original publication in 1983 in Australia by publisher Allen and Unwin the novel was later published as follows:

- Fjord Press, USA, 1985
- Ballantine Books, USA, 1987
- Allen and Unwin, Australia, 1991 and 2003

The novel was also translated into French in 1988, and into Russian in 1990.

Hardy books typically wound up selling 10,000 copies and The Empty Beach would sell 30,000.

== Radio adaptation ==
The novel was adapted for radio on the ABC.

== Film adaptation ==
The novel was adapted for a feature film of the same name in 1985. The film featured Bryan Brown as Cliff Hardy, along with Anna Maria Monticelli and Belinda Giblin. The film was directed by Chris Thomson from a screenplay by Keith Dewhurst.

== See also ==
- 1983 in Australian literature
