= Craig Powell (poet) =

Australian poet and psychoanalyst (1940–2022)

Craig Powell (16 November 1940 – 29 August 2022) was an Australian poet.

== Life ==
Powell was born in Wollongong, New South Wales, Australia on 16 November 1940. He graduated in medicine from Sydney University and later specialised in Psychiatry.

From 1972 to 1982, he lived in Canada where he trained with the Toronto Institute of Psychoanalysis. He spent the remainder of his life in Sydney, Australia where he was a psychoanalyst in private practice and a visiting medical officer in Mental Health, at the Prince of Wales Hospital. In 2011, he fell, resulting in traumatic brain injury that forced him to retire from psychoanalysis and poetry, though his existing work is sometimes included in collections.

He won the 1983 Mattara Newcastle Poetry Prize and was a co-winner of the 45th International Poetry Competition (1989) organized by the Quarterly Review of Literature, Princeton, New Jersey. He has published eight poetry collections and individual poems were included in The Best Australian Poetry 2007 and in New Oxford Book of Australian Verse. More recently he published chapbooks The Poem As A Place (September 2004), Poems For A Marriage (July 2008) and A Mind Knowing Us (2013) through Picaro Press.

Powell died at Ryde, New South Wales, Australia on 29 August 2022.

== Work (poetry collections) ==
- A Different Kind of Breathing: Poems. Sydney: South Head Press 1966
- I Learn by Going: Poems. Five Dock, NSW: South Head Press 1968
- A Country Without Exiles: Poems. Five Dock, NSW: South Head Press 1972
- Rehearsal for Dancers: Poems. Winnipeg, Canada: Turnstone Press 1978
- Selected Poems 1963–1977. London, Canada: Killaly Press 1978
- A Face in Your Hands. Berrima, NSW: South Head Press 1984 (Poetry Australia No. 97)
- The Ocean Remembers It Is Visible. Princeton New Jersey, Quarterly Review of Literature 1989
- Minga Street: New and Selected Poems. Sydney: Hale and Iremonger 1993
- Music and Women's Bodies. Wollongong, NSW: Five Islands Press 2002
- The Poem as a Place: and other poems. Warners Bay, NSW: Picaro Press 2004
- Poems for a Marriage. Warners Bay, NSW: Picaro Press 2008
- A Mind Knowing Us. Warners Bay, NSW: Picaro Press 2013

== Books ==
- A Country Without Exiles (1972)
- Music and Women's Bodies (Five Islands Press, 2002)
- "A Mind Knowing Us" (Picaro Press, 2013)
