= The Greenwich Apartments =

1986 crime novel by Australian writer Peter Corris

- Author: Peter Corris
- Language: English
- Series: Cliff Hardy
- Genre: Crime fiction
- Publisher: Allen and Unwin
- Publication date: 1986
- Publication place: Australia
- Media type: Print
- Pages: 173
- ISBN: 0048200301
- Preceded by: The Big Drop, and Other Cliff Hardy Stories
- Followed by: Deal Me Out

The Greenwich Apartments is 1986 Australian crime novel by Peter Corris.

It was the sixth novel, and eighth book, featuring the author's continuing character Cliff Hardy.

== Synopsis ==
Hardy is called in to investigate the murder of a young film-maker whose body was found near the Greenwich Apartments in Sydney's King's Cross.

== Critical reception ==
Reviewing the novel in The Age newspaper critic Peter Pierce commented that "Corris's remarkable sensitivity to urban and suburban locations in Sydney is just not a matter of accurate and evocative description, but a responsiveness towards human uses and misuses of place." Pierce went on to note that, as a result, the author "finds himself relating the same kind of story in each Hardy novel. One consequence of that is careless plotting in detail."

In a brief note in The Sydney Morning Herald a reviewer stated that "Corris's strength continues to be his exploration of Sydney's floating world, and his evocative urban backdrops."

== Publication history ==
After the novel's initial publication in 1986, it was reprinted as follows:

- Ballantine Books, USA, 1988

== See also ==
- 1986 in Australian literature
