= Heroin Annie and Other Cliff Hardy Stories =

1984 short story collection by Australian writer Peter Corris

- Author: Peter Corris
- Language: English
- Series: Cliff Hardy
- Genre: Crime fiction story collection
- Publisher: Allen and Unwin
- Publication date: 1984
- Publication place: Australia
- Media type: Print
- Pages: 266
- ISBN: 0868613991
- Preceded by: The Empty Beach
- Followed by: Make Me Rich

Heroin Annie and Other Cliff Hardy Stories is a collection of short stories by Peter Corris first published in 1984.

It was the fifth book, and first story collection, featuring the author's continuing character Cliff Hardy.

Several of the stories had been previously published in The National Times newspaper, with the rest being published here for the first time.

== Contents ==
- "Heroin Annie"
- "The Luck of Clem Carter"
- "Silverman"
- "Stockyards at Jerilderie"
- "Blood is thicker"
- "Mother's boy"
- "Man's best friend"
- "Escort to an easy death"
- "California dreamland"

== Critical reception ==
In The Canberra Times reviewer Mark Thomas wrote: "Short stories suit Corris's talents admirably, for they give him a chance to relax with his detective creation. With short stories the author is under less pressure to sustain a mood or a plot. Corris has now refined a laconic, wry, sardonic style, one which is so distinctively Australian that we are left wondering how Raymond Chandler picked up the same technique. Perhaps he was lucky to be looking at the same, ocean; Sydney and California may not be too far apart in their sensibilities."

The book became a best seller.

== Publication history ==
After the collection's initial publication in Australia in 1984, it was reprinted as follows:

- Allen and Unwin, UK, 1985
- Ballantine Books, USA, 1987

The collection was also translated into French in 1991.

== See also ==
- 1984 in Australian literature
