= At the Florida =

1993 Australian poetry collection by John Tranter

- Author: John Tranter
- Language: English
- Genre: Poetry collection
- Publisher: University of Queensland Press
- Publication date: 1993
- Publication place: Australia
- Media type: Print
- Pages: 99 pp
- Awards: 1993 The Age Book of the Year – Poetry Prize, winner
- ISBN: 0702225533

At the Florida is a collection of poems by Australian poet John Tranter, published by University of Queensland Press in 1993.

The collection contains 54 poems from a number of newspapers and literary publications, such as The Bulletin, both in Australia and overseas.

It was the winner of the 1993 The Age Book of the Year – Poetry Prize.

== Contents ==
- "Storm Over Sydney"
- "The Romans (for Dr Grahame Caisley)"
- "A Marriage"
- "Journey"
- "Ariadne on Lesbos"
- "Leaving the Sixties"
- "Days in the Capital"
- "God on a Bicycle"
- "The Painted Veil (for Philip Mead)"
- "Anyone Home?"
- "Australia Day"
- "The Moths (for August Kleinzahler)"
- "Opus Dei"
- "Gravity"
- "Decalcomania"
- "Dark Harvest (for Dana Gioia)"
- "Stony River"
- "At the Florida"
- "Falling"
- "Hot Nights"
- "A Man and a Woman"
- "North Woods (for John Ashbery)"
- "The Other Side of the Bay (for Pamala Karol)"
- "Curriculum Vitae"
- "Con's Cafe"
- "Another Country"
- "Cellar"
- "Cubans"
- "Oblivion"
- "Dizzy"
- "The Narcolept"
- "Smoke"
- "Two Views of Lake Placid (for Susan Wyndham)"
- "Prose Poem: At Naxos"
- "Snap"
- "Percentage Macedonian (for John A. Scott)"
- "Tantrum Gang (for Kenward Elmslie)"
- "Old Europe"
- "Exiles"
- "Snip"
- "Family Scent"
- "Acid Rain"
- "Mahogany"
- "Gasoline"
- "Box Contaminant"
- "A Plume of Ash"
- "Chicken Shack"
- "Cable Chimp"
- "Bachelor Pad"
- "Bells Under Water"
- "April Surprise"
- "Adler, Honda and Co"
- "Quaker Clambake"
- "Haibun : Aurora"

== Critical reception ==
In The Sydney Morning Herald reviewer Heather Cam called the collection "a sophisticated cocktail" that "leaves a moody aftertaste and is apt to induce intellectual morning-after befuddlement."

In a survey of the finalists for the 1993 The Age Book of the Year – Poetry Prize in The Age newspaper, this collection was described as "Brooding, nostalgic, but at times disarmingly tender."

== Notes ==
- Dedication: This book is dedicated to the memory of my mother Anne Katherine Tranter nee Brown 1906-1989

== See also ==
- 1993 in Australian literature
