= The January Zone =

1987 crime novel by Australian writer Peter Corris

- Author: Peter Corris
- Language: English
- Series: Cliff Hardy
- Genre: Crime fiction
- Publisher: Allen and Unwin
- Publication date: 1987
- Publication place: Australia
- Media type: Print
- Pages: 205
- ISBN: 0042000505
- Preceded by: Deal Me Out
- Followed by: Man in the Shadows : A Short Novel and Six Stories

The January Zone is 1987 Australian crime novel by Peter Corris.

It was the eighth novel, and tenth book, featuring the author's continuing character Cliff Hardy.

== Synopsis ==
Cliff Hardy is hired to act as a bodyguard for politician Peter January. Hardy follows him to Washington DC, where January is to appear before a Congressional Committee.

== Critical reception ==
In The Canberra Times reviewer Mark Thomas said the novel was "not the best in the Hardy series." Meanwhile, Rod White, in his review for the Victor Harbour Times, wrote that "Corris has returned with a vengeance" after his previous book, Greenwich Apartments.

== Publication history ==
After the novel's initial publication in 1987, it was reprinted as follows:

- Ballantine Books, USA, 1987

== See also ==
- 1987 in Australian literature
