= Ghosting William Buckley =

1993 Australian poetry collection by Barry Hill

- Author: Barry Hill
- Language: English
- Genre: Verse novel
- Publisher: Heinemann
- Publication date: 1993
- Publication place: Australia
- Media type: Print
- Pages: 151 pp
- Awards: 1994 New South Wales Premier's Prize for Poetry, winner
- ISBN: 0855615184

Ghosting William Buckley is a verse novel, consisting of a collection of poems by Australian poet Barry Hill, published by Heinemann in 1993.

The novel follows the life of William Buckley, a convict who escaped from a Victorian settlement in 1803 and was discovered by the Indigenous Wallarranga tribe of the Wathaurong nation with whom he lived for 32 years.

The collection contains 8 poems. Three of the poems were previously published, in a different form, in Overland.

It was the winner of the 1994 New South Wales Premier's Prize for Poetry.

== Contents ==
- "Iron Kettle"
- "The Big Ear"
- "Totem"
- "Swan"
- "Heart"
- "The Blind Boy"
- "Sites"
- "Cannibal"

== Background ==
In his acknowledgements author Barry Hill stated: "Craig Robertson's excellent Buckley's Hope (Scribe 1980) has been invaluable since it became a bed-side book about ten years ago. To it I am indebted for the Aboriginal terms used here, as well as some dramatic episodes in Buckley's life. Behind the scholarship that informs Robertson's fiction, is the problematic journalism of John Morgan's The Life and Adventures of William Buckley (1852), a book that I moved through to make the poem."

Author Hill originally wrote his story of Buckley as a radio production which was broadcast on Melbourne radio 3AR on 17 April 1988.

== Critical reception ==
Reviewing the volume for The Age newspaper Peter Porter found some problems with it: "Hill has clearly been haunted by Buckley's experience, but the poem he has made from its extant record has too little unfocused imagination and too much historical detail."

In his review of the book for Island magazine, poet and critic Geoff Page called this book of poetry "a clever one". He went on to comment that this is "perhaps the kind of potential the Jindyworabaks were looking for in the 1940s but which is not easily achieved. Even in this book it is a lyrical high point, not often reached."

== Awards ==
- 1993 The Age Book of the Year Poetry Award, shortlisted
- 1994 New South Wales Premier's Prize for Poetry, winner

== See also ==
- 1993 in Australian literature
