= The Dunbar Case =

2013 crime novel by Australian writer Peter Corris

- Author: Peter Corris
- Language: English
- Series: Cliff Hardy
- Genre: Crime fiction
- Publisher: Allen and Unwin
- Publication date: January 2013
- Publication place: Australia
- Media type: Print
- Pages: 247
- ISBN: 1743310226
- Preceded by: Comeback
- Followed by: Silent Kill

The Dunbar Case is 2013 Australian crime novel by Peter Corris.

It was the thirty-first novel, and thirty-eighth book, featuring the author's continuing character Cliff Hardy.

== Synopsis ==
Cliff Hardy is contacted by Henry Wakefield, a history professor, and tasked with visiting John Twizell in prison. Twizell is possibly related to the last living survivor of the wreck of the Dunbar. There is also the possibility of a missing treasure was taken off the ship. But Hardy is waylaid by a criminal gang that want access to both Twizell and the treasure.

== Critical reception ==
In The Sydney Morning Herald Sue Turnbull wrote: "Family feuds, career criminals, missing diamonds, buried treasure, attractive (older) women: there's never, ever a dull moment and Corris keeps it moving in his lively, economical prose. Like the crime meister that he is, Corris makes it all appear so easy."

Reviewing the novel for Australian Book Review Laurie Steed noted that "Corris is clearly at home within the boundaries of crime fiction. The Dunbar Case is easy to read, well plotted, and suggests that, at the age of seventy, Corris can still hold his own in an increasingly crowded genre."

== See also ==
- 2013 in Australian literature
