= Silent Kill (novel) =

2014 crime novel by Australian writer Peter Corris

- Author: Peter Corris
- Language: English
- Series: Cliff Hardy
- Genre: Crime fiction
- Publisher: Allen and Unwin
- Publication date: 1 January 2014
- Publication place: Australia
- Media type: Print
- Pages: 264
- ISBN: 9781743316375
- Preceded by: The Dunbar Case
- Followed by: Gun Control

Silent Kill is 2014 Australian crime novel by Peter Corris.

It was the thirty-second novel, and thirty-ninth book, featuring the author's continuing character Cliff Hardy.

== Synopsis ==
Rory O'Hara is an ex-student agitator, an ex-independent MP, and is now trying to drum up support for a new political party. But he has enemies and was recently run down in a car accident, though maybe it wasn't such an accident, and he now needs some protection. So Cliff Hardy is engaged by an old friend to join O'Hara's entourage to Wollongong. Things go off the rails rather quickly and the political campaign comes to grief when O'Hara's girlfriend is kidnapped and his nurse is murdered. Hardy seems at a loose end until the nurse's brother engages him to find her killer, a search that will take him all over the country.

== Critical reception ==
Sue Turnbull, in The Age newspaper commented: "Peter Corris has always had his finger on the political pulse, but never more so than in this Hardy outing that manages to resonate both with the political impulses of a whistleblower in the Julian Assange mode, and the more recent ICAC inquiry into government corruption in NSW. This is the best kind of crime fiction, holding a mirror up to the muddled times in which we live to reveal a not altogether flattering reflection."

In The Weekly Times Glenn Mulcaster was impressed with the work: "Hardy remains at heart a relentless womanising former prize-fighter always trying to turn a buck to pay the bills but now revels in grandparenthood and confesses to a changed outlook on life after undergoing open heart surgery in California on a previous assignment...This book, as with most Corris crime thrillers is a one-session read, and is difficult to put down."

== Notes ==
- Dedication: For Tom and Linda
- Epigraph: If there's any milk been spilt, I trust you to get it back into the bottle...Tidy him up. – John le Carré, Smiley's People

== See also ==
- 2014 in Australian literature
