= John Tranter =

Australian writer (1943–2023)

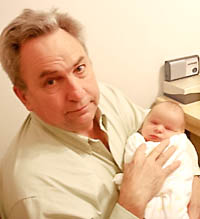
- Tranter with his grandson in 2005
- Born: 29 April 1943; Cooma, New South Wales, Australia
- Died: 21 April 2023 (aged 79); Sydney, Australia
- Occupations: Poet, publisher, editor
- Known for: Poetry

John Ernest Tranter (29 April 1943 – 21 April 2023) was an Australian poet, publisher and editor. He published more than twenty books of poetry; devising, with Jan Garrett, the long running ABC radio program Books and Writing; and founding in 1997 the internet quarterly literary magazine Jacket which he published and edited until 2010, when he gave it to the University of Pennsylvania.

The Australia Council awarded him a Creative Arts Fellowship in 1990; some Australian poets "acknowledge his role as innovator and experimentalist".

== Life ==
Tranter was born in Cooma, New South Wales and attended country schools, then took his BA in 1970 after attending university sporadically. He worked mainly in publishing, teaching and radio production, and has travelled widely, making more than twenty reading tours to venues in the United States, in Britain and Europe since the mid-1980s. He lived in Sydney, Melbourne and Brisbane in Australia, and overseas in London, Cambridge, Singapore, Florida, and San Francisco. He spent most of his life in Sydney, where he was a company director (with his wife Lyn) of Australian Literary Management, a leading literary agency. He was married to Lyn, with adult children Kirsten and Leon, and in 2009 completed a Doctorate of Creative Arts University of Wollongong.

Tranter died on 21 April 2023, at the age of 79.

== Literary career ==
In 1975, Tranter co-designed the first Books & Writing radio program for the Australian Broadcasting Corporation, a program format which was still going strong thirty years later. During 1987 and 1988, he was the executive producer in charge of the ABC Radio National weekly two-hour arts program Radio Helicon, and from 1990 to 1993 he was the poetry editor of The Bulletin, the venerable Australian weekly magazine of politics, business, and the arts.

Tranter received many fellowships and other grants, and had been a visiting scholar at various institutions, from visiting fellow in the Faculty of Arts at the Australian National University to writer-in-residence at Rollins College in Winter Park, Florida and at Cambridge University in England. He published over twenty volumes of poetry, including Urban Myths: 210 Poems: New and Selected (University of Queensland Press, St Lucia, 2006) and Starlight: 150 Poems (University of Queensland Press, St Lucia, 2010).

His Starlight: 150 Poems, published by the University of Queensland Press, won the Queensland State Literary Award for poetry and the Age Book of the Year award for poetry in 2011, and Urban Myths: 210 Poems: New and Selected, published by the University of Queensland Press, won the Victorian Premier's Prize for poetry in 2006, the New South Wales Premier's Literary Awards Kenneth Slessor Prize in 2007, the South Australian Premier's Awards John Bray prize for poetry in 2008 and the South Australian Premier's Awards Premier's Prize for the best book overall (2006 and 2007) in 2008. His Under Berlin, published by the University of Queensland Press, won the Kenneth Slessor Prize for Poetry (the New South Wales State Literary Award for Poetry) in 1989, and At The Florida won the Melbourne Age 'Book of the Year' award for poetry in 1993. Other recent books are The Floor of Heaven (HarperCollins, 1992), a book-length sequence of four verse narratives, the poetry collections Late Night Radio (Polygon, Edinburgh, UK, 1998), Heart Print (Salt, Cambridge, UK, 2001), Different Hands (Folio/ Fremantle Arts Centre Press, Cambridge and Western Australia, 1998), a collection of seven experimental computer-assisted prose pieces, Borrowed Voices (Shoestring Press, Nottingham, 2002), a dozen reinterpretations of poems by other poets, Studio Moon and Trio (both Salt Publishing publications, UK, 2003).

Tranter compiled and edited The Penguin Book of Modern Australian Poetry with Philip Mead in 1991. Earlier anthologies include the controversial The New Australian Poetry (Makar, Brisbane, 1979), and a selection of ninety-four poems from the Australian bicentennial poetry competition in 1988, published by ABC Books as The Tin Wash Dish.

In 2004 he built a free prototype internet site that presented biographical and bibliographical information about over seventy Australian poets as well as poems, book reviews and interviews. In 2005 he handed the project over to a consortium consisting of the University of Sydney English Department, the University of Sydney Library and the Copyright Agency Limited. In 2006 the consortium was granted half a million dollars by the Australian Research Council to further extend the work as a research project as the Australian Poetry Library with an internet site hosted by the University of Sydney Library. The project was launched at State Government House, Sydney, on 25 May 2011, by which time it featured over 42,000 poems by Australian poets from 1800 to the present.

In 2014 John Tranter founded the Journal of Poetics Research with three other Managing Editors: Dr Kate Lilley, University of Sydney; Dr Ann Vickery, Deakin University; and Professor Philip Mead, University of Western Australia; and some thirty other (mostly international) editors. The first (free) issue was published at the end of September 2014, and two issues per year, in March and September, were planned at that time.

== Awards ==
- 2011: Arts Queensland Judith Wright Calanthe Award for a poetry collection for Starlight: 150 Poems
- 2011: The Age Book of the Year Award for Poetry for Starlight: 150 Poems
- 2009: Civitella Ranieri Foundation Fellowship (six-week residency in Umbria)
- 2008: South Australian Premier's Awards Premier's Prize for the best book overall 2006 and 2007 for Urban Myths: 210 Poems: New and Selected
- 2008: South Australian Premier's Awards John Bray prize for poetry for Urban Myths: 210 Poems: New and Selected
- 2007: New South Wales Premier's Literary Awards Kenneth Slessor Prize for Urban Myths: 210 Poems: New and Selected
- 2006: Victorian Premier's Literary Award C. J. Dennis Prize for Poetry Prize for Urban Myths: 210 Poems: New and Selected
- 1993: The Age Book of the Year Award for Poetry for At the Florida
- 1993: Wesley Michel Wright Prize for Poetry for The Floor of Heaven
- 1989: New South Wales Premier's Literary Awards Kenneth Slessor Prize for Under Berlin
- 1988: Grace Leven Prize for Poetry for Under Berlin

== Selected bibliography ==
- 1970: Parallax, South Head Press
- 1973: Red Movie and other poems, Angus & Robertson
- 1973: The Blast Area Gargoyle Poets number 13), Makar Press
- 1976: The Alphabet Murders (notes from a work in progress), Angus & Robertson
- 1977: Crying in Early Infancy: 100 Sonnets, Makar Press
- 1979: Dazed in the Ladies Lounge, Island Press (Australia)
- 1983: Selected Poems, Hale & Iremonger
- 1988: Under Berlin, University of Queensland Press
- 1991: The Floor of Heaven, HarperCollins/Angus & Robertson
- 1993: At the Florida, University of Queensland Press
- 1997: Gasoline Kisses, Equipage, Cambridge, UK
- 1998: Late Night Radio, Polygon Press
- 1998: Different Hands, Folio/Fremantle Arts Centre Press
- 2000: Blackout, Vagabond Press
- 2001: Ultra: 25 poems, Brandl & Schlesinger
- 2001: Heart Print, Salt Publishing
- 2003: Trio, Salt Publishing
- 2003: Studio Moon, Salt Publishing
- 2006: Urban Myths: 210 Poems: New and Selected, University of Queensland Press
- 2010: Starlight: 150 Poems, University of Queensland Press
- 2015: Heart Starter, Puncher and Wattmann

=== As editor ===
- 1979: The New Australian Poetry, Makar Press, Qld
- 1989: The Tin Wash Dish, ABC Enterprises, NSW
- 1991: The Penguin Book of Modern Australian Poetry, John Tranter and Philip Mead, Penguin Books, Melbourne
- 2007: The Best Australian Poetry 2007, guest editor, University of Queensland Press
- 2011: The Best Australian Poems 2011, editor, Black Inc, Melbourne
- 2012: The Best Australian Poems 2012, editor, Black Inc, Melbourne
