= Cornelius Moynihan =

Australian librarian and poet (1862–1915)

- Born: Cornelius Moynihan; 10 June, 1862; Kerry, Ireland
- Died: 14 November, 1915 (aged 53); Sandgate, Brisbane, Queensland, Australia
- Occupations: Librarian and author
- Known for: Poetry
- Notable work: Miscellaneous Poems

Cornelius Moynihan (10 June, 1862 - 14 November, 1915) was an Irish-born Australian librarian and poet.

== Biography ==
He was born on 10 June 1862 in County Kerry, Ireland as the second child and elder son of Denis Moynihan and Margaret Moynihan. The entire Moynihan family migrated from Ireland to Brisbane in 1869 and occupied two acres of land in an area known as The Dip in North Brisbane, Australia and built a house.

The entire Moynihan family stayed in that house for several generations. Although he never got married, it is believed that he may have fathered an illegitimate son from an affair with Sarah Bennett.

He died in Brisbane on 14 November 1915 and was buried in the Nudgee cemetery of Brisbane.

== Career ==
=== Poet ===
In 1880, he published a slim poetry volume called as Miscellaneous Poems — mainly love songs and epigrams under the pen-name 'Vivian'.

=== Librarian ===
He was appointed as assistant librarian to the Queensland parliament in 1884.

== Bibliography ==
His notable works of poetry are:

- The Bunyip of Wendouree and Other Poems
- Eureka (manuscript, 1904)
- The German Armageddon (Brisbane, 1915)
- The Feast of the Bunya, an 'Aboriginal ballad' , published in 1901
