= White Meat =

1981 crime novel by Australian writer Peter Corris

- Author: Peter Corris
- Language: English
- Series: Cliff Hardy
- Genre: Crime fiction
- Publisher: Pan Books
- Publication date: 1981
- Publication place: Australia
- Media type: Print
- Pages: 205
- ISBN: 0330270184
- Preceded by: The Dying Trade
- Followed by: The Marvellous Boy

White Meat is a 1981 Australian crime novel by Peter Corris.

It was the second novel featuring the author's continuing character Cliff Hardy.

== Plot synopsis ==
Hardy is engaged by bookmaker Ted Tarleton to find his missing daughter, Noni, who seems to have gone off the rails.

== Critical reception ==
In The Canberra Times reviewer Mark Thomas called the novel "the best kind of thriller, focussed only on telling a good story, gleefully mixing up suspense with satire, drama with wit."

== Publication history ==
After the novel's initial publication by Allen and Unwin in Australia in 1981, it was reprinted as follows:

- Ballantine Books, USA, 1986
- Allen and Unwin, Australia, 2014

The novel was also translated into French in 1989.

== See also ==
- 1981 in Australian literature
