= Translations from the Natural World =

1992 Australian poetry collection by Les Murray

- Author: Les Murray
- Language: English
- Genre: Poetry collection
- Publisher: Isabella Press
- Publication date: 1992
- Publication place: Australia
- Media type: Print
- Pages: 67 pp.
- Awards: 1993 New South Wales Premier's Literary Awards winner; and 1993 Victorian Premier's Literary Awards winner

Translations from the Natural World is a collection of poems by Australian poet Les Murray, published by Isabella Press in 1982.

The collection contains 48 poems from a variety of sources.

== Contents ==
- "Kimberley Brief"
- "Equinoctial Gales at Hawthornden Castle, Midlothian"
- "Ultima Ratio"
- "North Country Suite"
- "Eagle Pair"
- "Layers of Pregnancy"
- "Strangler Fig"
- "Insect Mating Flight"
- "Two Dogs"
- "Cockspur Bush"
- "Lyre Bird"
- "Shoal"
- "Prehistory of Air"
- "The Gods"
- "Cattle Ancestor"
- "Mollusc"
- "Cattle Egret"
- "The Snake's Heat Organ"
- "Great Bole"
- "Echidna"
- "Yard Horse"
- "The Octave of Elephants"
- "The Masses"
- "That Evolution Proceeds by Charity and Faith"
- "Queen Butterfly"
- "Pigs"
- "Mother Sea Lion"
- "MeMeMe"
- "Puss"
- "Shellback Tick"
- "Cell DNA"
- "Sunflowers"
- "Goose to Donkey"
- "Spermaceti"
- "Honey Cycle"
- "The Dragon"
- "Animal Nativity"
- "Stone Fruit"
- "Deer on the Wet Hills"
- "Raven, Sotto Voce"
- "Cuttlefish"
- "Migratory"
- "From Where We Live on Presence"
- "Possum's Nocturnal Day"
- "Home Suite"
- "The Fellow Human"
- "The Wedding at Berrico"
- "Crankshaft"

== Critical reception ==
Writing in The Age newspaper reviewer Kevin Hart noted that this poet's "idiom is utterly distinctive; it enables him to write poems, often quite long ones, that are sustained only by that idiom. Yet his very fluency encourages him to confuse poetic material with finished poems." He then went on to comment that "it is refreshing to find him, in a series of verbal games, trying to let the natural world speak."

In The Guardian Michael Husle called this collection "an enjoyable read", noting that the "zest that went into the writing is plain in his technical versatility."

== Awards ==
- 1993 New South Wales Premier's Literary Awards winner
- 1993 Victorian Premier's Literary Awards winner

== See also ==
- 1992 in Australian literature
