= Marreau =

Hemlock Montrachet Etienne Boniface Marreau
- First appearance: Marreau and the Chocolate Policeman (1991)
- Created by: Robert Houghton Farrow

In-universe information
- Gender: Male
- Occupation: Private Detective
- Nationality: Disputed but Francophone

Hemlock Marreau is a fictional Francophone detective created by Robert Farrow. To date he has featured in eleven "detective comedy" plays. Marreau speaks with a French accent but seems unsure of his true country of birth. His arch rival Professor Maurice Hearty accuses him of in fact being English – and of being his half brother. Marreau is regularly assisted by his able assistant Gwendolyn Smith (née Bayne) and hindered by his affable, wealthy but rather dim friend Simon Simpson.

== List of Plays ==
The eleven plays are listed below along with the years of their first performance.

1. Marreau and the Chocolate Policeman (1991)
2. Marreau and the African Moon (1992)
3. Marreau and the Curse of Cardiff (1993)
4. Marreau and the Bloody Carpet (1994)
5. Marreau and the Sword of Carthage (1995)
6. Marreau and the Clouds of Death (1996)
7. Requiem for Marreau (2001)
8. Marreau and the Tregalleon Inheritance (2002)
9. Marreau and the Terror of Tring (2004)
10. Marreau and the Grey Dagger (2010)
11. Marreau and the Killer Rabbit (original title: Marreau and the Trilobite of Rheims) (2014)

All the plays have premièred in the Tring area, being produced by Frayed Knot Theatre Company. The first three plays were performed originally in village halls in the area, while all subsequent ones have been staged at The Court Theatre, Pendley, Tring. The latest play in the sequence, Marreau and the Killer Rabbit, was performed there in April/May 2014.

== Sources ==
- Marreau website
- Frayed Knot website
- The Court Theatre, Pendley, Tring
