= Deep Water (Corris novel) =

2009 novel by Peter Corris

- Author: Peter Corris
- Series: Cliff Hardy
- Genre: Crime fiction
- Publisher: Allen & Unwin
- Publication date: 2009
- Media type: Print
- Pages: 214
- ISBN: 978-1-74175-677-7
- Preceded by: Open File
- Followed by: Torn Apart

Deep Water is a 2009 crime novel by Australian author Peter Corris.

It was the twenty-seventh novel, and thirty-fourth book, featuring the author's continuing character Cliff Hardy.

In April 2009, The Independent Weekly called Deep Water "a web of intrigue". Deep Water is the thirty fourth novel in the series, whose protagonist has been called "Sydney’s best-known private investigator" In 2009, Corris won the Ned Kelly Award for Deep Water in the fiction category.

The Cliff Hardy series had been thought to end with the previous novel, Open File. Corris stated Open File was last in the series and its release would conclude 28 years of work on the series. However, Deep Water begins with Hardy in recovery after having open-heart surgery. This is reflective of the series, which was itself recovering from a premature retirement.
