= Aftershock (novel) =

1991 crime novel by Australian writer Peter Corris

- First edition (publ. Allen & Unwin)
- Author: Peter Corris
- Language: English
- Series: Cliff Hardy
- Genre: Crime fiction
- Publisher: Allen and Unwin
- Publication date: 1991
- Publication place: Australia
- Media type: Print
- Pages: 227
- ISBN: 1863590285
- Preceded by: Wet Graves
- Followed by: Beware of the Dog

Aftershock is a 1991 crime fiction novel by Australian writer Peter Corris.

It was the eleventh novel, and the fourteenth book, featuring the author's continuing character Cliff Hardy.

== Synopsis ==
The body of Oscar Bach has been identified after being found in the rubble of a building collapsed by the 1989 Newcastle earthquake. So why was he seen alive five minutes later by his only friend Horrie Jacobs? Cliff Hardy is engaged to find out which leads him towards corrupt polcie and a serial killer.

== Critical reception ==
In The Age newspaper Laurie Clancy noted that Hardy "lacks the wit of Philip Marlowe and Aftershock is short on snappy one-liners, but like most of Corris's protagonists Hardy is deeply nationalistic under a veneer of cynicism."

== Publishing history ==
After the novel's initial publication in Australia in 1991 it was reprinted by Allen and Unwin in 2014.
