= Beware of the Dog (novel) =

1992 crime novel by Peter Corris

- First edition (publ. Allen & Unwin)
- Author: Peter Corris
- Language: English
- Series: Cliff Hardy
- Genre: Crime fiction
- Publisher: Allen and Unwin
- Publication date: 1992
- Publication place: Australia
- Media type: Print
- Pages: 191
- ISBN: 1863590544
- Preceded by: Aftershock
- Followed by: Burn, and Other Stories

Beware of the Dog is a 1992 crime fiction novel by Australian writer Peter Corris.

It was the twelfth novel, and the fifteenth book, featuring the author's continuing character Cliff Hardy.

== Synopsis ==
Hardy's new love, Senior Sergeant Glenys, has arranged for him to deliver a lecture to police about the work of a private investigator. There he meets Paula Wilberforce. His instincts tell him that she is bad news, and that he should avoid her. He takes no notice and soon finds himself embroiled in her large family of trouble-makers, his gun is stolen and he's then investigated in relation to a shooting.

== Critical reception ==
Jeff Popple, in The Canberra Times, commented "Once again Corris has produced a very polished piece of crime fiction that entertains from beginning to end."

In a short review in The Age newspaper Ray Davie finds that "Hardy is still tough, impecunious, the great observer and born survivor."

== Publishing history ==
After the novel's initial publication in Australia in 1992 it was reprinted as follows:

- Dell Books, USA, 1995
- Allen and Unwin, Australia, 2014

== See also ==
- 1992 in Australian literature
