= Cabin Fever (novel) =

1990 novel by Australian writer Elizabeth Jolley

- Author: Elizabeth Jolley
- Language: English
- Genre: Fiction
- Publisher: Viking
- Publication date: 1990
- Publication place: Australia
- Media type: Print
- Pages: 237 pp.
- ISBN: 0670831557
- Preceded by: My Father's Moon
- Followed by: The Georges' Wife

Cabin Fever (1990) is a novel by Australian writer Elizabeth Jolley. It was originally published by Viking in Australia in 1990.

The novel was the second in the author's Vera Wright trilogy, along with My Father's Moon (1989) and The Georges' Wife (1993).

== Synopsis ==
Vera Wright, now in her sixties, arrives in New York to deliver a paper at a medical conference but finds herself unable to leave her hotel room, struck down with "cabin fever".

== Critical reception ==
Writing in The Canberra Times Marian Eldridge stated: "Elizabeth Jolley's admirers will not be dis appointed with Cabin Fever, which is a kind of sequel to that splendid novel My Father's Moon...Cabin Fever is an intricately woven book that manages the dips and sweeps of memory without seeming forced or artificial...It is Jolley's use of fractured time to present her material, her counterpointing of her facts, that make Cabin Fever such an imaginative feat."

A reviewer at Publishers Weekly noted: "Narrated in a series of short, intense flashbacks by the adult Vera, who has come to a medical conference in New York City only to find herself emotionally incapable of leaving her hotel room, the novel conveys the claustrophobic grip of unbearably poignant memories, the essence of bereavement, and the resiliency of the human spirit. Psychologically acute and penetrating, this is Jolley writing with masterful power."

== Publication history ==
After its original publication in 1990 in Australia by publisher Viking the novel was later reprinted as follows:

- Sinclair Stevenson, USA, 1991
- Penguin, Australia, 1991 and 2008
- Harper, USA, 1991

== Awards ==
The novel won the ALS Gold Medal in 1991.

== See also ==
- 1990 in Australian literature
