= The Dying Trade =

1980 crime novel by Australian writer Peter Corris

- Author: Peter Corris
- Language: English
- Series: Cliff Hardy
- Genre: Fiction
- Publisher: McGraw-Hill
- Publication date: 1980
- Publication place: Australia
- Media type: Print
- Pages: 229 pp.
- ISBN: 007072928X
- Preceded by: -
- Followed by: White Meat

The Dying Trade (1980) is a crime novel by Australian writer Peter Corris. It was originally published by McGraw-Hill in Australia in 1980.

This novel was the first of the author's long-running series of novels featuring the recurring character private investigator Cliff Hardy. Corris said it took five years to get published by which time he had already written the second Hardy novel and started on the third. He said the publisher resistance came about because "They said that Australian crime readers wanted books about New York, LA or London. They weren’t interested in local crime apart from, as you say, the pulp stuff, Carter Brown, Larry Kent, which was really sort of faux-American. It really wasn’t set anywhere. But those publishers were wrong." Corris said the book was "a success, very well reviewed."

The Sydney Review of Books wrote "it might be argued that where Cliff Hardy was concerned, his entry in The Dying Trade (1980) was his finest moment, no matter that more than forty appearances were to come. The private detective was imagined with a brilliant economy. The Hardy business and the accompanying literary style seem fully formed from the start."

== Synopsis ==
When private investigator Cliff Hardy is summonsed to the home of wealthy property owner of Bryn Gutteridge at Vaucluse, an exclusive Sydney suburb, he is asked to investigate who is threatening Gutteridge's sister Susan. This all sounds rather simple but the case gets complicated when Gutteridge's family disputes start to take over, Hardy is fired and then re-hired by Gutteridge's stepmother after someone tries to kill her.

== Critical reception ==
Mark Thomas, writing in The Canberra Times noted: "Corris' work may appear derivative and stylised, but that is the nature of the thriller. The reader wants to live off the sniff of a nuance, by determining how well the author can recount yet again the misadventures of a detective's encounters with high society...Corris succeeds in finding new angles and loopholes. The Dying Trade is genuinely full of suspense, packed with violence, paced fast and well, and maintains at least some vestiges of plausibility in the story."

Reviewing the book on the "AustCrime" website Karen Chisholm stated: "Early 1980's Sydney is a world away from current day Sydney and yet in many ways it's not, and the Hardy series is a testament to the similarities and changes. Hardy is a product of this place, and he inhabits a world that Peter Corris seemed to love, understand and despair of. The descriptive elements of the novels are beautifully done, crisp, pointed, short, sharp, Corris was a master at the art of the precise and the pithy."

In 1986 Corris said:

I can't read the first book now. I think it was mannered and overwritten and pastiche and derivative, and so on. The first book's got the whole Chandler thing — clinic, mad doctor, incest, the disturbances of the moneyed class — it's just a straight Chandler pinch. The ones I'm doing now I think are a bit more original in terms of what dislocations of life there are in Australia — you know, there's dirty money and dirty cops and drugs. And we have a city that you can live in very comfortably, having a terrific time — but you know that just around the corner the most dreadful things are going on, and the most vile things are being done to people. I think I'm writing more about Australia as she is — but as a heightened fiction writer's imagination sees it.

== Publication history ==
After its original publication in 1980 in Australia by publisher Macmillan the novel was later published as follows:

- Pan Books, Australia, 1982
- Text Publishing, Australia, 2012

== See also ==
- 1980 in Australian literature
