= Barry Hill (Australian writer) =

Australian historian, poet, journalist and academic

- Born: 1943 (age 82–83); Melbourne, Victoria
- Occupation: Poet
- Writing career
- Language: English
- Years active: 1966-
- Notable awards: 1990 Anne Elder Award; 1991 New South Wales Premier's Literary Award - Non-Fiction; 1994 New South Wales Premier's Literary Award - Poetry; 2004 National Biography Award

Barry Hill (born 1943) is an Australian historian, writer, and academic.

He has written poetry, fiction, non-fiction, and libretti. He is known for his biography of anthropologist Ted Strehlow, called Broken Song: T G H Strehlow and Aboriginal Possession, published in 2002.

== Early life and education ==
Hill was born in Melbourne.

He studied at the University of Melbourne, gaining his Bachelor of Arts (BA), Bachelor of Education (BEd) and a Doctor of Philosophy (PhD) and from there went to London, where he gained his Master of Arts (MA) degree from the University of London.

== Writing career ==
Hill has worked in both Melbourne and London. In London he worked for the Times Literary Supplement.

In 1975 Hill became a full-time writer. Between 1998 and 2008 he was poetry editor of The Australian newspaper.

== Stage ==
Hill was part of the cast in the first public performance of Kenneth G. Ross's important Australian play Breaker Morant: A Play in Two Acts, presented by the Melbourne Theatre Company at the Melbourne Athenaeum on 2 February 1978.

== Performance works ==
Hill has produced performance works for radio, including Desert Canticles, that premiered on ABC Radio on 5 February 2001. Hill is quoted as saying the piece was inspired by the following:

"Desert Canticles arises out of a marriage, a decade of travelling, and some years writing the literary biography of T.G.H. Strehlow out of Central Australia. I was writing my own poems out of love and the landscape, while trying to fathom Strehlow's great achievement in Songs of Central Australia. So the notion of translation as a metaphor for relationship – with place, with others, and with songs of different cultures (Hebraic, Buddhist, and Aboriginal) became a natural one upon which to thread a radio work."

== Awards ==
- 1991 New South Wales Premier's Literary Awards Douglas Stewart Prize for Non-Fiction, for Sitting In
- 1994 New South Wales Premier's Literary Awards Kenneth Slessor Prize for Poetry for Ghosting William Buckley
- 2003 Victorian Premier's Literary Award Non-Fiction award for Broken Song: T G H Strehlow and Aboriginal Possession
- 2004 New South Wales Premier's Literary Awards NSW Premier's Biennial Prize for Literary Scholarship for Broken Song: T.G.H. Strehlow and Aboriginal Possession
- 2004 Victorian Premier's Literary Award, the Alfred Deakin Prize for an Essay Advancing Public Debate for The Mood We're In: circa Australia Day 2004
- 2004 National Biography Award for Broken Song: T G H Strehlow and Aboriginal Possession
- 2004 Tasmania Pacific Bicentenary History Award for Broken Song: T G H Strehlow and Aboriginal Possession
- 2005 Victorian Community History Awards for Best Print/Publication, with and the Borough of Queenscliffe, for The Enduring Rip: A History of Queenscliffe
- 2012 Shortlisted for 2012 Forward Prize for Naked Clay

== Personal life ==
Hill is married to Rose Bygrave, a member of the band Goanna, and lives in Queenscliffe, Victoria.

== Bibliography ==
Poetry

- Raft: Poems 1983–1990 (Penguin, 1990) ISBN 0140423729
- Ghosting William Buckley (Heinemann, 1993)
- The Inland Sea (Salt Publishing, 2001) ISBN 1876857277
- The War Sonnets (Picaro Press, 2006) ISBN 1920957251
- Necessity: Poems 1996–2006 (soi3 modern poets, 2007) ISBN 9780957941168
- As We Draw Ourselves (Five Islands Press, 2008) ISBN 9780734038890
- Four Lines East (Whitmore Press, 2009) ISBN 9780975776254
- Lines for Birds (UWA, 2011) ISBN 9781921401534
- Naked Clay (Shearsman, 2012) ISBN 9781848611870
- Grass Hut Work (Shearsman, 2016) ISBN 9781848614758
- Eagerly We Burn (Shearsman, 2019) ISBN 9781848616080
- Kind Fire (Arcadia, 2020) ISBN 9781925984804
- Cold Mountain and the Sea (Arcadia, 2021) ISBN 9781922669254
- Lamb (Re.Press, 2024) ISBN 9780648728276

Short stories

- A Rim of Blue (McPhee Gribble, 1978) ISBN 0869140086
- Headlocks & Other Stories (McPhee Gribble, 1983) ISBN 0869140272

Novels

- The Schools (Penguin, 1977) ISBN 0140219862
- Near the Refinery (McPhee Gribble, 1980) ISBN 0869140116
- The Best Picture (McPhee Gribble, 1988) ISBN 0869140507

Non-fiction

- Sitting In (Heinemann, 1991) ISBN 0855614153
- The Rock: Travelling to Uluru (Allen & Unwin, 1994) ISBN 1863737782
- The Enduring Rip: A History of Queenscliffe (MUP, 2004) ISBN 0522851193

Selected essays

- The Mood We're In: circa Australia Day 2004. Overland 77.

Biography

- Broken Song: T G H Strehlow and Aboriginal Possession (Knopf-Random House 2002) ISBN 1740510658

Libretti

- The Dark (Southern Cross University – University Library Lismore collection, 1999)
- Desert Canticles, Veronica Dobson (performer), Elena Kats-Chernin (composer) (Australian Music Centre, 2001)
- Song of Songs, music by Andrew Schultz (Australian Music Centre)
- Love Strong as Death: a New Song of Songs, composer Andrew Schultz, performed at 'The Studio', The Sydney Opera House, May 2004

Political philosophy

- Peacemongers 2014
