= Peter Corris =

Australian writer (1942–2018)

- Born: Peter Robert Corris; 8 May 1942; Stawell, Victoria, Australia
- Died: 30 August 2018 (aged 76); Sydney, New South Wales, Australia
- Occupation: Writer
- Years active: 1973-2017

Peter Robert Corris (8 May 1942 – 30 August 2018) was an Australian academic, historian, journalist and a novelist of historical and crime fiction. As crime fiction writer, he was described as "the Godfather of contemporary Australian crime-writing", particularly for his Cliff Hardy novels.

== Biography ==
Corris' secondary school education was at Melbourne High School. He was a Bachelor level student at the University of Melbourne, then gained a Master of Arts in history at Monash University. He studied at the Australian National University where he was awarded a PhD in history on the topic of the South Seas Islander slave trade (Kanakas). He continued these studies as a university lecturer, but later became a journalist, being a literary editor of the National Times. He recalled, "I got sick of the literary editor shit. I got fucking sick of new books, beautiful new hardbacks flowing in every week in their dust covers, filling the cupboard up. For the first year or so I thought, 'This is heaven.'... It was a dream job for 18 months but it got to the stage where I hated the look of a new book."

The first Cliff Hardy book was The Dying Trade. Corris later recalled "I'd already finished the second one because I enjoyed doing the first one so much, and had started a third one, and well, the ball just got rolling, even though it took about 5 years for the first one to get published."

He was married to writer Jean Bedford.

Peter Corris wrote a book, Sweet & Sour: A Diabetic Life (2000), that provided deep insights into his life living with type-1 diabetes. Some of his novels have diabetic subplots. In January 2017, Corris announced that he would no longer be writing novels owing to 'creeping blindness' because of his diabetes.

== Awards and achievements ==
- Ned Kelly Awards for Crime Writing, Lifetime Achievement, 1999: winner
- Ned Kelly Awards for Crime Writing, Best Fiction, 2004: nominated for Master's Mates
- Ned Kelly Awards for Crime Writing, Best Fiction, 2006: shortlisted for Saving Billie
- Ned Kelly Awards for Crime Writing, Best Fiction, 2007: shortlisted for The Undertow
- Ned Kelly Awards for Crime Writing, Best Fiction, 2008: nominated for Appeal Denied
- Ned Kelly Awards for Crime Writing, Best Fiction, 2008: nominated for Open File
- Ned Kelly Awards for Crime Writing, Best Fiction, 2009: winner for Deep Water

== Partial list of books ==
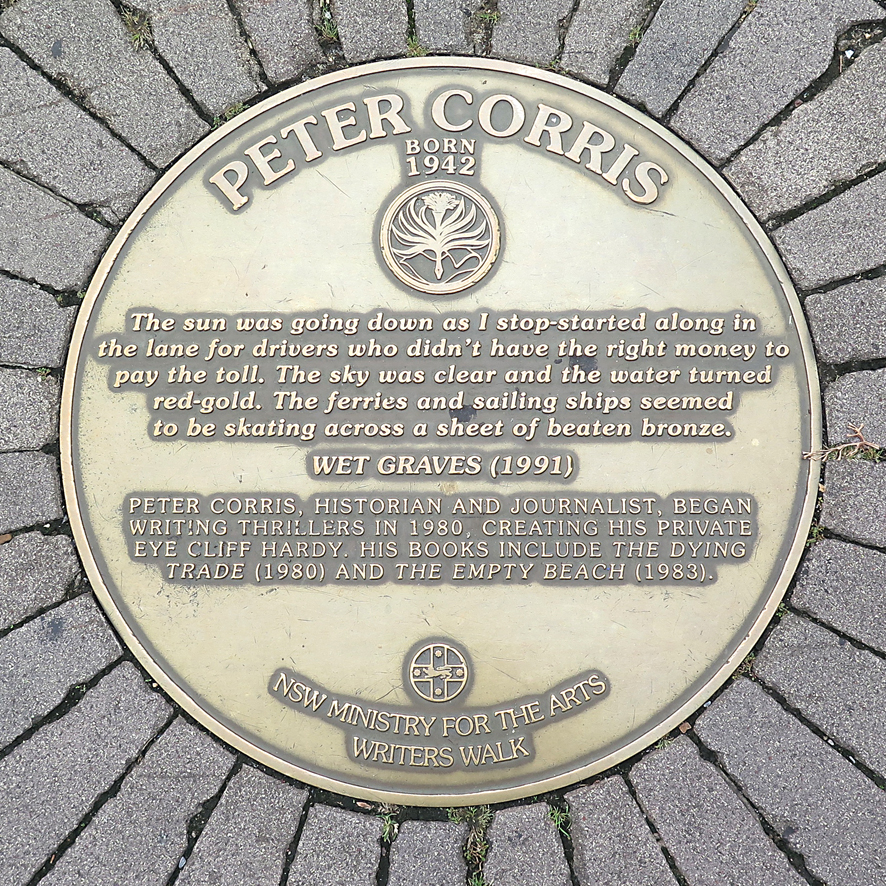
Corris' plaque on the Sydney Writers Walk

=== Cliff Hardy novels ===
- The Dying Trade (McGraw-Hill, 1980); ISBN 0-070-7292-8X
- White Meat (Sydney, Pan Books, 1981); ISBN 0-330-27018-4
- The Marvellous Boy (Sydney, Pan Books, 1982); ISBN 0-330-27019-2
- The Empty Beach (Sydney, Allen & Unwin, 1983); ISBN 0-86861-229-4
- Heroin Annie and Other Cliff Hardy Stories (Sydney, Allen & Unwin, 1984); ISBN 0-86861-399-1
- Make Me Rich (Sydney, Allen & Unwin, 1985); ISBN 0-86861-660-5
- The Big Drop, and Other Cliff Hardy Stories (Sydney, Allen & Unwin, 1985); ISBN 0-86861-767-9
- The Greenwich Apartments (Sydney, Allen & Unwin, 1986); ISBN 0-04-820030-1
- Deal Me Out (Sydney, Allen & Unwin, 1986); ISBN 0-86861-978-7
- The January Zone (Sydney, Allen & Unwin, 1987); ISBN 0-04-200050-5
- Man in the Shadows : A Short Novel and Six Stories (Sydney, Allen & Unwin, 1988); ISBN 0-04-320226-8
- O'Fear (Sydney, Bantam, 1990); ISBN 0-947189-73-4
- Wet Graves (Sydney, Bantam, 1991); ISBN 1-86359-025-0
- Aftershock (Sydney, Bantam, 1991); ISBN 1-86359-028-5
- Beware of the Dog (Sydney, Bantam, 1992); ISBN 1-86359-054-4
- Burn and Other Stories (Sydney, Bantam, 1993); ISBN 1-86359-069-2
- Matrimonial Causes (Sydney, Bantam, 1993); ISBN 1-86359-077-3
- Casino (Sydney, Bantam, 1994); ISBN 1-86359-113-3
- The Washington Club (Sydney, Bantam, 1997); ISBN 0-7338-0031-9
- Forget Me If You Can: Cliff Hardy Stories (Sydney, Bantam, 1997); ISBN 0-7338-0066-1
- The Reward (Sydney, Bantam, 1997); ISBN 0-7338-0070-X
- The Black Prince (Sydney, Bantam, 1998); ISBN 1-86325-132-4
- The Other Side of Sorrow (Sydney, Bantam, 1999); ISBN 1-86325-185-5
- Lugarno (Sydney, Bantam, 2001); ISBN 1-86325-298-3
- Salt and Blood (Sydney, Bantam, 2002); ISBN 1-86325-374-2
- Master's Mates (Sydney, Allen & Unwin, 2003); ISBN 1-74114-136-2
- The Coast Road (Sydney, Allen & Unwin, 2004); ISBN 1-74114-384-5
- Taking Care of Business: Cliff Hardy Cases (Sydney, Allen & Unwin, 2004); ISBN 1-74114-419-1
- Saving Billie (Sydney, Allen & Unwin, 2005); ISBN 1-74115-621-1
- The Undertow (Sydney, Allen & Unwin, 2006); ISBN 978-1-74114-748-3
- Appeal Denied (Sydney, Allen & Unwin, 2007); ISBN 978-1-74175-096-6
- The Big Score: Cliff Hardy Cases (Sydney, Allen & Unwin, 2007); ISBN 978-1-74175-223-6
- Open File (Sydney, Allen & Unwin, 2008); ISBN 978-1-74175-417-9
- Deep Water (Sydney, Allen & Unwin, 2009); ISBN 978-1-74175-677-7
- Torn Apart (Sydney, Allen & Unwin, 2010); ISBN 978-1-74237-536-6
- Follow the Money (Sydney, Allen & Unwin, 2011); ISBN 978-1-74237-379-9
- Comeback (Sydney, Allen & Unwin, 2012); ISBN 978-1-74237-724-7
- The Dunbar Case (Sydney, Allen & Unwin, 2013); ISBN 978-1-74331-022-9
- Silent Kill (Sydney, Allen & Unwin, 2014); ISBN 978-1-74331-637-5
- Gun Control (Sydney, Allen & Unwin, 2015); ISBN 978-1-76011-206-6
- That Empty Feeling (Sydney, Allen & Unwin, 2016); ISBN 978-1-76011-207-3
- Win, Lose or Draw (Sydney, Allen & Unwin, 2017); ISBN 978-1-76029-478-6

=== Ray Crawley novels ===
- Pokerface (Melbourne, Penguin, 1985); ISBN 0-14-008587-4
- The Baltic Business (Melbourne, Penguin, 1988); ISBN 0-14-010842-4
- The Kimberly Killing (Melbourne, Penguin, 1988); ISBN 0-14-011506-4
- The Cargo Club (Melbourne, Penguin, 1990); ISBN 0-14-012803-4
- The Azanian Action (Sydney, Angus & Robertson, 1991); ISBN 0-207-17213-7
- The Japanese Job (Sydney, Angus & Robertson, 1992); ISBN 0-207-17528-4
- The Time Trap (Sydney, HarperCollins, 1994); ISBN 0-7322-5016-1
- The Vietnam Volunteer (Lismore, NSW, Southern Cross University Press, 2000); ISBN 1-875855-45-9

=== Richard Browning novels ===
- Box Office Browning (Melbourne, Viking, 1987); ISBN 0-670-81696-5
- Beverly Hills Browning (Melbourne, Penguin, 1987); ISBN 0-14-010739-8
- Browning Takes Off (Melbourne, Penguin, 1989); ISBN 0-14-012159-5
- Browning in Buckskin (Melbourne, Penguin, 1991); ISBN 0-14-014699-7
- Browning P.I. (Sydney, Angus & Robertson, 1992); ISBN 0-207-17415-6
- Browning Battles On (Sydney, Angus & Robertson, 1993); ISBN 0-207-17613-2
- Browning Sahib (Sydney, HarperCollins, 1994); ISBN 0-7322-5043-9
- Browning Without a Cause (Sydney, ETT Imprint, 1995); ISBN 1-875892-22-2

=== Luke Dunlop novels ===
- Set Up (Sydney, Pan Macmillan, 1992); ISBN 0-330-27342-6
- Cross Off (Sydney, Pan Macmillan, 1993); ISBN 0-330-27385-X
- Get Even (Sydney, Pan Macmillan, 1994); ISBN 0-330-27478-3

== Other works ==
- Passage, Port and Plantation: A History of Solomon Islands Labour Migration, 1870-1914 (Melbourne, Melbourne University Press, 1973); ISBN 0-522-84050-7
- Lords of the Ring (Sydney, Cassell Australia, 1980); ISBN 0-7269-1406-1
- Lightning Meets the West Wind: The Malaita Massacre, by Roger M. Keesing & Peter Corris (Melbourne, Oxford University Press, 1980); ISBN 0-19-554223-1
- The National Times Australian Book of Quizzes, by Jean Bedford & Peter Corris (Sydney, Allen & Unwin, 1983); ISBN 0-86861-094-1
- The Winning Side (Sydney, Allen & Unwin, 1984); ISBN 0-86861-785-7
- The Australian Family Quiz Book (Sydney, Angus & Robertson, 1985); ISBN 0-207-15060-5
- The Gulliver Fortune (Sydney, Bantam Books, 1989); ISBN 0-947189-81-5
- Naismith's Dominion (Sydney, Bantam Books, 1990); ISBN 1-86359-017-X
- Fred Hollows: An Autobiography, by Fred Hollows with Peter Corris (Melbourne, John Kerr, 1991); ISBN 0-9588004-6-4
- The Brothers Craft (Sydney, Bantam Books, 1992); ISBN 1-86359-053-6
- Fighting for Fraser Island: A Man and an Island, by John Sinclair with Peter Corris (Sydney, Kerr Publishing, 1994); ISBN 1-875703-16-0
- Wimmera Gold (Sydney, Bantam Books, 1994); ISBN 1-86359-258-X
- A Round of Golf: 18 Holes with Peter Corris (Sydney, Allen & Unwin, 1998); ISBN 1-86448-853-0
- Petro-Pirates: The Hijacking of the Petro Ranger, by Ken Blyth with Peter Corris (Sydney, Allen & Unwin, 2000); ISBN 1-86508-368-2
- Sweet & Sour: A Diabetic Life (Lismore, NSW, Southern Cross University Press, 2000); ISBN 1-875855-46-7
- The Journal of Fletcher Christian: Together with the History of Henry Corkill (Sydney, Random House Australia, 2005); ISBN 1-74051-351-7
- Blood Brothers (Sydney, Lothian Books, 2007; ISBN 978-0-734-41006-1
- Wishart's Quest (Melbourne, Arcadia, 2009); ISBN 978-1-921-50954-4
- The Colonial Queen (Melbourne, Arcadia, 2011); ISBN 978-1-921-87531-1
- Mad Dog: William Cyril Moxley and the Moorebank Killings (Sydney, University of New South Wales Press, 2011); ISBN 978-1-742-23286-7
- Standing in the Shadow: Three Novellas (Melbourne, Arcadia, 2013); ISBN 978-1-921-87532-8
- Damned If I Do, by Philip Nitschke with Peter Corris (Melbourne, Melbourne University Press, 2013); ISBN 978-0-522-86141-9

== Edited ==
- The Picador Book of Golf, edited by Peter Corris & Jamie Grant (Sydney, Picador, 1995); ISBN 0-330-35692-5
- Ringside: A Knockout Collection of Fights & Fighters: The Winners, the Losers, the Legends, edited by Peter Corris & Barry Parish (Sydney, Random House Australia, 1996); ISBN 0-09-183333-7
- Menace in the Mulga (Brisbane, Crime Writers Queensland, 2000); ISBN 0-9585413-2-9
- Heart Matters: Personal Stories About That Heart-Stopping Moment, edited by Peter Corris & Michael Wilding (Melbourne, Viking, 2010); ISBN 978-0-670-07385-6
- Best on Ground: Great Writers on the Greatest Game, edited by Peter Corris & John Dale (Melbourne, Viking, 2010); ISBN 978-0-670-07460-0

== See also ==
- William R. Bell
- Malaita massacre
- List of fictional private investigators
- Jimmy Sharman
- Jim Sharman
