= Adelaide Writers' Week boycott =

2026 boycott of literary festival in Australia

The 2026 edition of Adelaide Writers' Week (AWW), an annual event in Australia held under the auspices of the wider Adelaide Festival (AF) but organised by a separate committee, was affected by a mass boycott of writers which precipitated its complete cancellation. The writers boycotted the event, due to be held from 28 February to 5 March 2026, after the Adelaide Festival board announced on 8 January that they had cancelled the scheduled appearance of Australian author Randa Abdel-Fattah, saying that it would "not be culturally sensitive" to do so following the 2025 Bondi Beach shooting.

By 13 January, around 180 participants had withdrawn from Writers' Week. All members of the Adelaide Festival board except one had also resigned following the backlash. Louise Adler, director of Adelaide Writers' Week, who had disagreed with the board, also announced her resignation on 13 January, saying that she could not be party to silencing writers. On the same day, the entire event was cancelled. Four members of a new board were announced, to be led by former AF chair Judy Potter. On 15 January, the Adelaide Festival issued an apology to Abdel-Fattah and invited her to speak at Adelaide Writers' Week 2027.

== Background ==
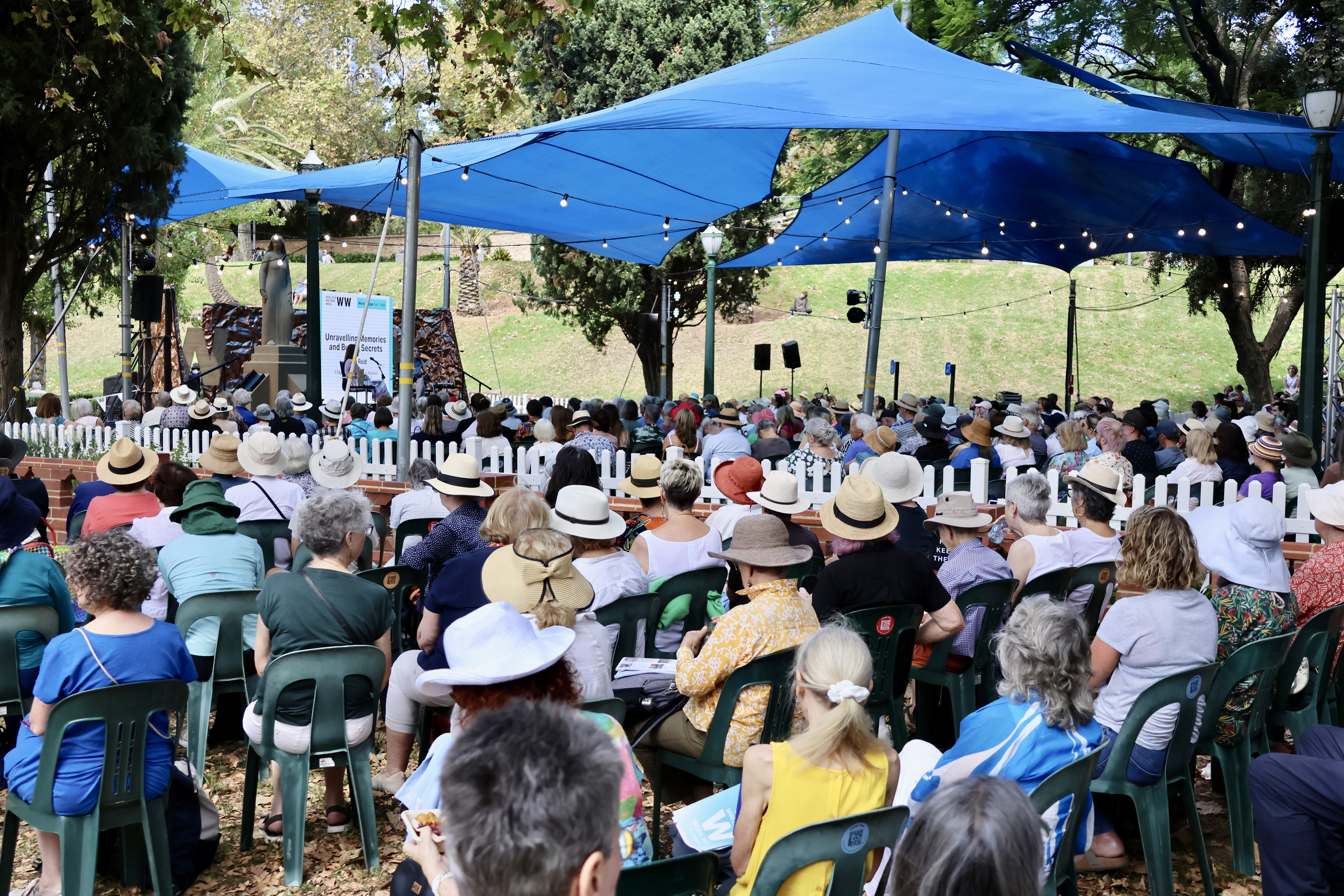
Adelaide Writers' Week 2025

With 160,000 attendees in 2025, Adelaide Writers' Week is the largest free literary festival in Australia. It is held under the auspices of the wider Adelaide Festival (AF) but organised by a separate committee. The director of AWW was Jewish Australian literary executive Louise Adler until her resignation in January 2026, during the boycott. The program comprises a curated selection of writers who are brought together to present six days of panel sessions held outdoors in the Pioneer Women's Memorial Garden in Adelaide, South Australia. It also includes ticketed events held elsewhere, and the talks are made available via podcast.

=== Previous protests ===
In 2023, there were protests against the inclusion of Palestinian American writer Susan Abulhawa and Palestinian writer and poet Mohammed el-Kurd in the AWW program. The Premier of South Australia, Peter Malinauskas, said on the opening night that he had come under pressure to defund the program, but that "leads us into the territory of Putin's Russia". Louise Adler, the Jewish director of AWW, defended the selections, reminding the media that authors were invited based on their writing, not their social media comments, and that criticising Israel does not equate to antisemitism. One long-term sponsor, MinterEllison, withdrew their funding for the event.

In February 2024, author Randa Abdel-Fattah, who is of Palestinian and Egyptian heritage, along with nine other academics, sent a letter to AF board chair Tracey Whiting, AWW director Louise Adler and AF CEO Kath Mainland, asking them to rescind an invitation to the New York Times columnist Thomas L. Friedman, who is Jewish, due to controversial comments he had made in a column which they alleged were racist towards Palestinians. According to former AWW director Jo Dyer, it was common to receive requests to exclude people from the event, but these were generally not acted upon. On that occasion, the board said that they supported Friedman's ongoing participation, but said that Friedman decided to withdraw owing to his own scheduling clash. However, Friedman disputed this, saying in 2026 that he had been disinvited by the organisers, who had explained to him that "the timing would not work out". According to former board member Tony Berg, Adler had lobbied for Friedman's removal from the program and that Berg had consequently resigned from the board in protest. Adler later said that Berg had breached confidentiality. Whiting wrote to the 10 signatories on the letter saying that "[a]sking the Adelaide Festival and Adelaide Writers' Week to cancel an artist or writer is an extremely serious request" and that "[w]e have an international reputation for supporting artistic freedom of expression".

=== Randa Abdel-Fattah ===
Abdel-Fattah has been an outspoken supporter of the Palestinian cause. Her research has covered topics such as Islamophobia, race and Palestine as well as youth and social movement activism. Her latest book, Discipline, explores the experience of Muslim Australians, some of Palestinian descent, during the Gaza war.

In a 2024 tweet, Abdel-Fattah stated that "The goal is decolonisation and the end of this murderous Zionist colony", the existence of which, she said, depends on violence against Palestinians. In February 2024 she reshared leaked details of over 600 Australian Jews in the 2024 J.E.W.I.S.H creatives and academics doxxing incident.

== 2026 event ==
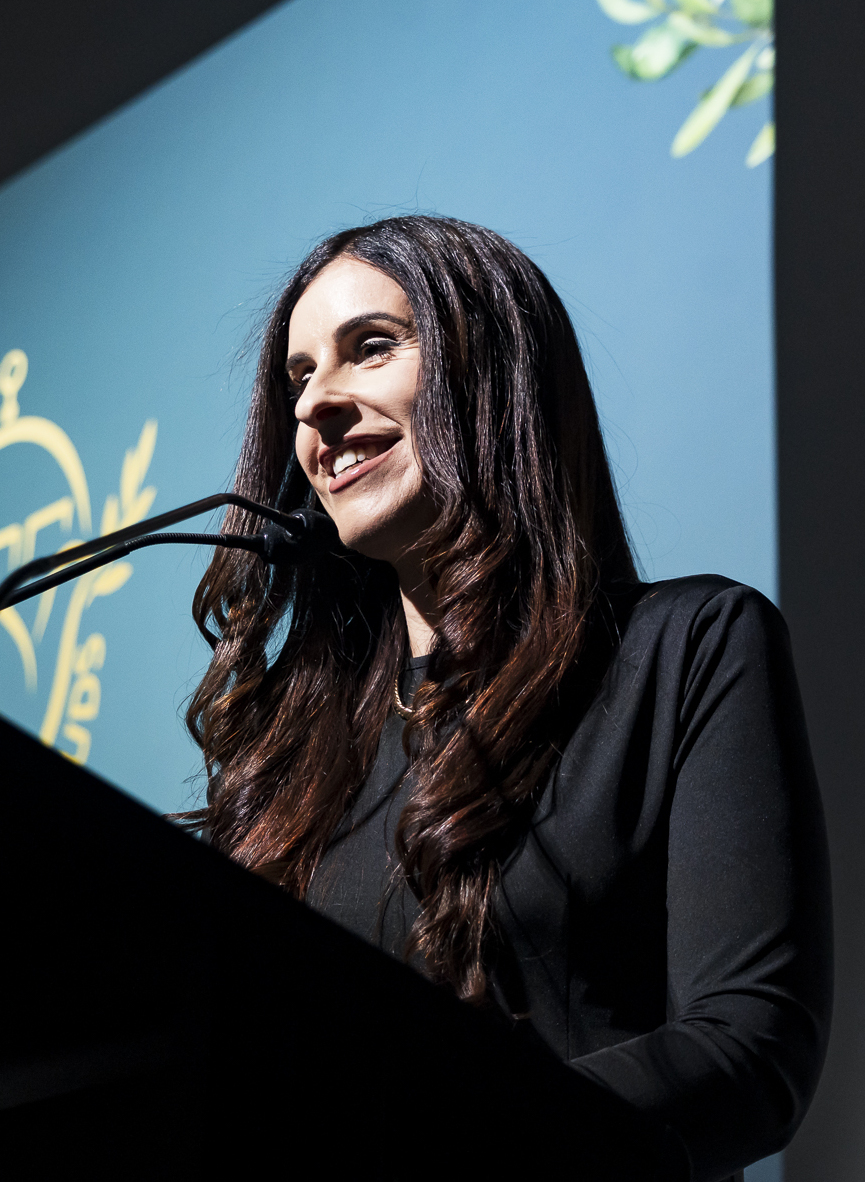
Randa Abdel-Fattah in 2026

The 2026 edition of Adelaide Writers' Week was due to be held from 28 February to 5 March 2026. Author Randa Abdel-Fattah, an Australian author of Egyptian and Palestinian descent, was due to appear at the event to talk about her latest novel, Discipline.

On 2 January, the South Australian premier, Peter Malinauskas, wrote to the board stating that Abdel-Fattah's appearance was "not in the public interest" and would be "contrary to current community expectations of unity, healing and inclusion" after the Bondi attack. Intense meetings between the AF board and the executive team took place, in which AF artistic director, Matthew Lutton, along with his CEO Julian Hobba, advised against excluding Abdel-Fattah. On 8 January 2026, the Adelaide Festival board, headed at the time by marketing executive Tracey Whiting, announced that Abdel-Fattah's scheduled appearance had been cancelled following a request from the Jewish Community Council of South Australia (JCCSA). The board's statement said that "given her past statements, we have formed the view that it would not be culturally sensitive to continue to program her at this unprecedented time so soon after Bondi" (referring to the 2025 Bondi Beach shooting). JCCSA's public and government liaison, Norman Schueler, said that the council had sent a letter to the Adelaide Festival board a few days earlier requesting that Abdel-Fattah be removed from the program. The board said in its statement that it did "not suggest in any way that Dr Randa Abdel-Fattah's or her writings have any connection with the tragedy at Bondi".

The board's decision was supported by the South Australian premier, Peter Malinauskas, who said that he was prevented by law from directing the Adelaide Festival's board but was happy to clarify that the state government was not in support of Abdel-Fattah's inclusion in the AWW program. It later emerged that the board took this action because it was afraid of government action on funding, with its 5 January meeting minutes noting "that government involvement materially changes the risk profile and that failure to act could jeopardise current and future funding, and the Festival's broader viability". On 7 January, AF executive director Julian Hobba wrote to the board asking for it to reverse its decision, after being assured by the Premier that funding would not be withdrawn.

Opposition leader Ashton Hurn also publicly supported the government's position, as did Federal cabinet minister Madeleine King. The federal arts minister, Tony Burke, declined to comment on the decision, saying it was a matter for the festival organisers.

The board's decision was opposed by City of Adelaide councillors Keiran Snape and Janet Giles, publishing house Pink Shorts Press and a number of Adelaide bookstores such as Imprints Booksellers.

== Backlash and boycott ==
There was immediate and strong backlash from writers and the public to this decision.

By the following day, dozens of prominent Australian and international authors had announced their intention to boycott the event. Writers to pull out included Trent Dalton, Peter FitzSimons, Hannah Kent, Helen Garner, Jennifer Mills, Michelle de Kretser, Melissa Lucashenko, Peter Greste, former Greek finance minister Yanis Varoufakis, Evelyn Araluen, Amy McQuire, Clare Wright, Chelsea Watego, Zadie Smith, M. Gessen, Jane Caro, Percival Everett and Sarah Krasnostein. Robbie Arnott and Bri Lee indicated that they would not participate unless Abdel-Fattah was reinstated. Susie Anderson, Karen Wyld, Dominic Guerrera, Vanessa Turnbull-Roberts, Tasma Walton and Gary Longsbrough were among First Nations authors boycotting the Writers' Week event. ArtsHub Australia reported that around 90 participants, including significant Australian and international guests, had withdrawn from the event, using numbers from the Australian Readers and Writers Against Genocide. On 11 January, The Guardian independently reported more than 70 withdrawals. Former New Zealand prime minister Jacinda Ardern, who was due to speak about her 2025 memoir, A Different Kind of Power, withdrew in the days following.

Foreign correspondent Peter Greste, who was imprisoned in Egypt in 2013 after he was falsely accused of having an association with the Muslim Brotherhood, said that his withdrawal from AWW was "a protest at the festival's decision to cancel someone for comments that they made before Bondi". Writers SA, the state's peak writing and literature organisation, also withdrew from the event. The Australia Institute announced it was withdrawing its sponsorship from the 2026 event, stating that it had "valued being part of discussions at the event, which in the past have promoted bravery, freedom of expression and the exchange of ideas. Censoring or cancelling authors is not in the spirit of an open and free exchange of ideas".

The Jewish Council of Australia criticised the removal of Abdel-Fattah, posting on social media: "The fact that yet another institution has caved to a relentless campaign waged against Dr. Abdel-Fattah and supporters of Palestinians should be deeply concerning to all who value a plural and open society".

As of 13 January 2026, 180 participants had withdrawn; all members of the AF board had resigned except for a representative from Adelaide City Council (whose term expires in February); and AWW director Louise Adler had resigned in protest at the board's decision.

The wider Adelaide Festival has also been affected, with DJ Haram announcing her withdrawal from an experimental music program. The British band Pulp, headed by Jarvis Cocker, who are scheduled to play at the free opening night concert of AF, had considered boycotting the event, but after the new board had apologised to Abdel-Fattah, agreed to go ahead with the engagement.

== Responses ==
=== Response by Abdel-Fattah ===
Abdel-Fattah said that the rescinding of her invitation was "a blatant and shameless act of anti-Palestinian racism and censorship and a despicable attempt to associate me with the Bondi massacre ... What makes this so egregiously racist is that the Adelaide Writers' Festival board has stripped me of my humanity and agency, reducing me to an object onto which others can project their racist fears and smears."

It was reported on 11 January that her lawyers had written to board chair Tracey Whiting asking her to identify specifically what led to their decision, requesting a response by 14 January, which should include "all documents in [the board members'] possession (including emails, text messages and content on disappearing messaging apps)" that relate to withdrawal.

After the board's dissolution and issue of an apology to Abdel-Fattah on 13 January, she responded to the board's statement by calling the apology "disingenuous" as it related only to how the message was sent to her, not the actual decision. She stated that this implies she was linked to a terror attack with which she was not involved, "nor any other Palestinian". (Note: She also wrote "Because I have too much respect for myself and for my people, for those who have suffered irreparable harm by the board's conduct, for the brilliant Louise Adler who was forced on principle to resign, I refuse and reject the board's apology. ... Once again, the board citing the 'national discourse' for an action that specifically targets me, a Palestinian-Australian Muslim woman, is explicitly articulating that I cannot be part of the national discourse, which is insulting and racist in the extreme".)

Can you imagine if a far-right Zionist walked into a Sydney mosque and murdered 15 people? Can you imagine that as the premier of this state, I would actively support a far-right Zionist going to writers' week and speaking hateful rhetoric towards Islamic people? Of course I wouldn't, but the reverse has happened in this instance. And I think that's a reasonable position for me to take, it's a view that I believe.

— Peter Malinauskas, 13 January 2026, speaking to his views on Abdel-Fattah's disinvitation

On 14 January, she sent a "show cause" legal notice to premier Malinauskas threatening legal action for defamation. She said that he had made many public statements about her, without ever meeting her, including suggesting that she was a terrorist sympathiser by linking her to the Bondi atrocity.

On 19 January, Abdel-Fattah sent a second concerns notice to Malinauskas for defamation, regarding statements he had made on 5AA radio on 14 January.

=== Open letter calling for reinstatement ===
On 10 January 2026, eleven former Adelaide Festival leaders submitted a strongly-worded open letter to the board and the South Australian Government, calling on them to reinstate Abdel-Fattah and calling the decision to cancel her "a grave mistake which brings the Festival and Writers' Week into disrepute and which may have far-reaching consequences for both the Festival and Writers' Week well into the future".

We call upon the Board to reinstate Dr Abdel-Fattah's invitation to the 2026 Adelaide Writers' Week immediately. An about-face may be embarrassing but it is both the right thing to do and will cauterise the growing damage to this much loved and internationally significant South Australian cultural institution.

The letter also referred to the board acting wisely in the lead-up to the 2023 festival, when director Louise Adler (herself Jewish) defended the inclusion of several Palestinian speakers, in particular two who had been criticised for comments made before the festival. (Note: In addition, noting that no board members had any experience in the arts, the open letter went on:"Whilst we acknowledge the Board has ultimate oversight of all facets of the Festival and Writers' Week operations, its first impulse should be to allow the Artistic Director and the Director of Adelaide Writers' Week to do their work without heeding the views of thought-police, media moguls or brilliantly co-ordinated lobbies. This decision appears as a humiliating rebuke to someone who has led Adelaide Writers' Week with immense distinction and courage in the face of unjustified hatred.")

Among those who signed the letter are: (Note: The other signatories were: Nicholas Heyward: AF chief executive officer 1997–2001; Kath M Mainland: AF chief executive 2022–2025; Ian Scobie: AF administrator 1990–1994; general manager 1994–1996; David Sefton: AF artistic director 2013–2016 festivals; Mary Vallentine: AF administrator 1978–1982; opera and music advisor 2018–2021 festivals)

- Neil Armfield: AF artistic director 2017–2022 festivals; participating artist many times from 1982 to 2023
- Rob Brookman: AF administrator 1983–1988; several other positions from 1990 to 2023
- Jo Dyer: AWW director 2019–2022
- Peter Goldsworthy: AWW chair 2012–2016; "serial participating writer"
- Jim Sharman: AF artistic director 1982; participating AF artist 1972, 1980, 1986, 1992, 2006; board member 1997–2002
- Anthony Steel: AF artistic director 1974, 1976, 1978, 1984, 1986; board member 1999–2002

=== Response by the organisers and government ===
After the announcements of writers boycotting AWW, Adelaide Festival removed the program from its website on 9 January 2026 owing to the boycott, with the statement:

In respect of the wishes of the writers who have recently indicated their withdrawal from the Writers' Week 2026 program we have temporarily unpublished the list of participants and events while we work through changes to the website.

On 11 January 2026, three AF board members, Daniela Ritorto, Donny Walford and Nicholas Linke, resigned their positions on the board, and later that same day AF board chair Tracey Whiting also resigned.

After more artists and sponsors had pulled out of the Adelaide Festival (which in 2025 was estimated to have generated $62.6 million in gross expenditure for the state and had 160,000 attendances at AWW over six days), Malinauskas said that he was concerned about the reputational and economic damage caused by the controversy. He said that he had been advised that the board was still functional on 12 January despite no longer having a gender composition of two men and two women as mandated by the Adelaide Festival Corporation Act 1998. Malinauskas was having meetings and continued to monitor the situation through the day.

On the morning of 13 January, Louise Adler, the director of Writers' Week, resigned from her position, saying that she could not be "party to silencing writers". She said that the AF board proceeded with rescinding Abdel-Fattah's invitation despite her strong opposition to the move and likened the present climate to one of McCarthyism. She explained her decision and her views on the matter in an article in The Guardian and later on ABC Television on 7.30.

On 13 January, the event was completely cancelled. The board, calling the decision a "regrettable outcome", published a statement including the words:

We recognise and deeply regret the distress this decision has caused to our audience, artists and writers, donors, corporate partners, the government and our own staff and people. We also apologise to Dr Randa Abdel-Fattah for how the decision was represented and reiterate this is not about identity or dissent but rather a continuing rapid shift in the national discourse around the breadth of freedom of expression in our nation following Australia's worst terror attack in history.

In an interview on 6 February 2026, the Adelaide Festival director Julian Hobba, who had only been appointed in September 2025, said that he had advised against withdrawing Abdel-Fattah's invitation to AWW, stating "I thought there were a number of recent examples that we could point to where wading into cancellation of individual artists had caused damage to a festival or a company or an institution. I also felt that we needed to trust the judgement of the director of Writers' Week". He had considered resigning along with the rest of the board, but decided against it, and he had had assurance that the festival would henceforth maintain its independence from the government. Artistic director Matthew Lutton, who had been overseas planning the 2027 programme when the announcement by the board was made, also criticised the decision in an interview in February 2026, saying that his team had "provided significant advice on what we would anticipate the results of that decision to be".

Further information came to light about events leading up to the decision, as well as the fallout among festival staff as it unfolded, after a series of internal emails were obtained by under FOI by the ABC. They included comments by CFO Karishma Reynolds that the decision had caused a "cultural crisis... unfolding hour by hour", as staff became the target of threats.

== Reactions to the boycott ==
The Jewish Community Council of South Australia public and government liaison, Norman Schueler, stated that he was "very, very surprised it appears a large cohort of people have decided to support" Abdel-Fattah, He later said "Unfortunately the public has not been made aware of the fact that she was cancelled for a reason, that she imbued hatred into the Australian community". He also said that he was saddened by the decision and (after her resignation) very sorry that Adler had resigned.

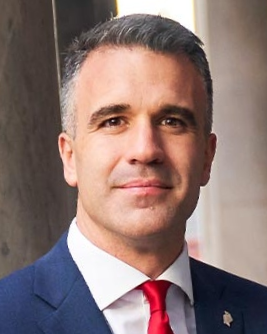
Premier of South Australia, Peter Malinauskas, who wrote to the AF board expressing his opposition to the appearance of Randa Abdel-Fattah at Writers' Week

South Australian premier Peter Malinauskas stated he did not support "writers who have actively advocated against the cultural safety of others and have doxxed other artists". Several commenters have pointed out that in 2023, facing calls to remove a different writer, he had said "if I was to unilaterally defund Writers' Week ... It's a path to a future where politicians decide what is culturally appropriate ... at worst, it leads us to a future in which politicians can directly stifle events that are themselves predicated on freedom of speech".

The Australia/Israel and Jewish Affairs Council's director of special projects, Bren Carlill, said on 12 January "I think this is really the first meaningful test post-Bondi of something really important ... I think they should stay the course".

Louise Adler, a member of the advisory committee of the Jewish Council of Australia, resigned as Writers' Week director on 13 January. In an opinion piece, she wrote "one doesn't have to be a student of history to know that art in the service of 'social cohesion' is propaganda". In an interview on 7.30 that night, she criticised politicians and lobby groups for imposing censorship on the arts and referred to Creative Australia's withdrawal of the artist Khaled Sabsabi from the Venice Biennale in 2025.

The J.E.W.I.S.H creatives and academics WhatsApp group condemned the boycott, pointing out Abdel-Fattah had participated in the 2024 doxxing of members of the group, which had previously campaigned for the sacking of journalist Antoinette Lattouf from the ABC for criticism of Israel.

== New board ==
On the afternoon of 13 January 2026, state arts minister Andrea Michaels announced that a new Adelaide Festival board had been appointed to be chaired by former AF chair (2016–2023) Judy Potter. Potter said in a press conference that she was focused on "steadying the ship" and that the well-being of festival staff was her top priority.

Other board members include:

- Rob Brookman (former executive director of AF), also programming director, producer, and artistic director of the Adelaide Festival Centre, and a signatory of the open letter protesting the previous board's action
- Jane Doyle, television news presenter for 7NEWS, member of the State Opera of South Australia board
- John Irving, a financial services businessman, former chair of the State Opera of South Australia and State Theatre Company South Australia

On 15 January, the new festival board issued a statement apologising unreservedly to Abdel-Fattah and issuing an invitation for her to speak at the 2027 Adelaide Writers Week. Abdel-Fattah accepted the apology and said she would consider the invitation "at the appropriate time but would be there in a heartbeat if Louise Adler was the director again".

== Media coverage ==
Media coverage of the boycott and subsequent cancellation of AWW has been widespread. Events were covered as they unfolded on a daily basis on Australian media from the time that the board announced the revocation of Abdel-Fattah's invitation. Coverage spread to international media, including the BBC, The Times, Deutsche Welle, The Independent, The New York Times, The Hollywood Reporter and CNN, as well as major outlets in Israel.

It was also reported on the Jewish Voice for Liberation website, a UK-based organisation formerly known as Jewish Voice for Labour, and the US-based Jewish News Syndicate.

== Impact ==
The operators of the book tent at AWW, Dillon's Bookshop on The Parade in Norwood, said that the cancellation of the event would mean a loss of hundreds of thousands of dollars' worth of books not being sold, which would impact authors and also casual staff suffering a loss of income. Hotel occupancy was likely to be affected as well, after forward bookings for the week had shown an increase on the previous year. According to Premier Malinauskas, "because the Adelaide Writers' Week is a free event, it is not a ticketed event, it generates zero revenue".

As of 16 January, the publishers of Discipline, University of Queensland Press, have noted on their website that "Due to an influx in orders, please note that there are currently extended wait times of 3+ weeks for orders of Discipline."

The incident has damaged the political reputation of the popular and formerly "Teflon" premier Malinauskas, due to his now-infamous "Bondi analogy", with a legal battle looming with Abdel-Fattah. Kelly Burke, writing in The Guardian, called the boycott "global literary mutiny", and wrote: "a frantic, six-day war of words had culminated in the end of the 2026 Adelaide writers' week and total institutional collapse".

== "Constellations: Not Writers' Week" ==
South Australian independent publisher Pink Shorts Press said that it was investigating the possibility of organising a "guerilla festival or protest event". Adelaide City councillor Keiran Snape called a special council meeting for 19 January at which he planned to move for the council to provide funding to Writers SA to help host such an event. At the meeting, the council voted down suggested funding of $250,000, but voted to enter discussions with Writers SA immediately to assist with organising a new festival. The council offered to have some of their buildings and/or the parklands used as venues, and there was great interest from writers and other stakeholders. On 28 January it was announced that one-off festival titled "Constellations" was being organised by Writers SA, Pink Shorts Press, and other community groups. One of the organisers was Adelaide author Jennifer Mills, chair of the Australian Society of Authors, who was scheduled to appear at AWW.

The event was officially titled "Constellations: Not Writers' Week", and took place between 28 February and 5 March 2026. It was described as an "umbrella festival... organised by a broad range of local representatives, including booksellers, publishers and authors, with not-for-profit industry body Writers SA acting as a central point of communication and logistics". Many sponsors and individuals gave donations to the festival, so that authors could be properly paid. The final program included over 100 authors and 50 events, with new authors joining some of those who had been scheduled for AWW. Venues extended to Port Augusta and the Adelaide Hills. Many South Australian writers appeared with international authors, and Constellations' focus on genre fiction, children's literature, poetry, and First Nations writers was greater than at AWW. An event called "Rivers of Reason" featured talks between Aboriginal and Arab writers. Francesca Albanese, UN Special Rapporteur on the occupied Palestinian territories, was beamed in for a panel discussion about settler colonialism. There was a panel discussion entitled "When We Refuse: Cultural boycotts, artist strikes and creative solidarity".

Randa Abdel-Fattah appeared at an "in conversation" event with former Writers' Week director Louise Adler, which was sold out. Other guests included Yankunytjatjara poet Ali Cobby Eckermann; journalist and human rights advocate Peter Greste Other guests included Greek Finance Minister Yanis Varoufakis, former Greens leader Bob Brown, Cheek Media CEO and author Hannah Ferguson, Ngarrindjeri/Kaurna poet Dominic Guerrera, former ABC reporter Noah Schultz-Byard, Moroccan-American author and academic Laila Lalami, British biographer Francesca Wade, Iraqi and Australian author Lur Alghurabi, and Australian authors Pip Williams, Maxine Beneba Clarke, Natalie Harkin, and K. A. Ren Wyld. It also includes a panel discussion entitled "When We Refuse: Cultural boycotts, artist strikes and creative solidarity". Many of the events were sold out.

== See also ==
- Bendigo Writers Festival boycott
- State Library Victoria Teen Writing Bootcamp controversy
