= BISG =

BISG could refer to:

- Book Industry Strategy Group, Australian governmental initiative
- Book Industry Study Group, American publishing trade organization
- Belt-Driven Integrated Starter Generator or Belt Mounted Integrated Starter Generator, alternate terms for a BAS hybrid
