= Susan Mitchell (disambiguation) =

Susan Mitchell is an American poet

Susan Mitchell may also refer to:

- Susan Langstaff Mitchell, Irish writer and poet
- Susan Mitchell (Australian author)
