= Smethurst v Commissioner of Police =

Judgement of the High Court of Australia

- Court: High Court of Australia
- Full case name: Smethurst v Commissioner of Police
- Decided: 15 April 2020
- Citation: [2020] HCA 14

Court membership
- Judges sitting: Kiefel CJ, Bell, Gageler, Keane, Nettle, Gordon & Edelman JJ

Case opinions
- 4:3 where an unlawful search by police results in the seizure of government proprietary information, there does not exist a juridical basis (legally-protected right or interest) sufficient to ground an injunction compelling the return of that information(per Kiefel CJ, Bell, Keane, Nettle JJ)
- Dissent: an equitable injunction ought be granted to ameliorate the consequences of a completed trespass. Damages could not address the fact police continued to hold Smethurst's private information, and the injunction could be framed so as to not unduly infringe upon the interests of police (per Edelman J) the original invasion of the plaintiff’s basic common law rights in land and goods through the unlawful search, provided the juridical basis for granting an injunction to reverse the ongoing consequences of those wrongs, namely the continued police retention of the phone data (per Gageler J) the juridical basis for granting the injunction was the original public law illegality perpetrated by the police, in conducting a search on the basis of invalid warrants (per Gordon J)

Smethurst v Commissioner of Police was a decision of the High Court of Australia. The court refused to grant an injunction to journalist Annika Smethurst, of The Sunday Telegraph, against the Australian Federal Police.

== Factual Background ==
Smethurst was a journalist who worked for Nationwide News Pty Ltd, publisher of The Sunday Telegraph. She had written in the newspaper to inform readers of proposed changes to Australian Government powers of surveillance in relation to the Australian Signals Directorate. The story included images of documents marked "secret" and "top secret". The Australian Federal Police executed a search warrant at Smethurst's residential premises. Police downloaded material from her phone onto a USB stick and seized it.

The case was brought under the original jurisdiction of the High Court, through the s75(v) provision for the court's hearing of injunctions sought against officers of the Commonwealth.

== Decision ==
The High Court found unanimously that the search warrants were unlawful for breach of statute. Smethurst did not seek damages in remedy of that breach, instead pleading for injunctive relief that would facilitate the return to her of the seized information.

Under the Australian common law there are three stages of analysis required before an injunction may be granted:

1. There must be a Juridical basis for the injunction (i.e. the plaintiff must show that a legally protected right or interest has been, or will be, breached by the defendant's acts.)
2. Damages must be an inadequate remedy
3. There must be no discretionary bar to injunctive relief

The court split primarily on the basis of whether a juridical basis existed for the injunction. The majority found that because the information possessed by Smethurst did not belong to her, the possession by the government of that information did not mean that the government was committing an ongoing tort. Therefore, no juridical basis existed and an injunction was refused.

Additionally, the majority found that even if a judicial basis had existed, relief would have been denied due it being contrary to the public interest. The particular public interest relied upon being the ability to investigate and prosecute crimes. It was sufficient in the majority's view that the information possessed by police might be used in a future prosecution.

== Aftermath ==
One month after the decision the AFP announced no charges would be laid against Ms Smethurst for her stories relying upon classified documents. The police have said all data has been destroyed.
