= Louise Adler =

Australian publisher (born 1954)

Louise Adler AM
- Born: 3 March 1954 (age 72); Melbourne, Victoria, Australia
- Education: University of Reading (BA); Columbia University (MA, MPhil)
- Occupations: Publisher, arts administrator
- Known for: Chief executive of Melbourne University Publishing (2003–2019); Director of Adelaide Writers' Week (2023–2026)
- Spouse: Max Gillies (m. 1981)
- Children: 2

Louise Adler AM (born 3 March 1954) is an Australian publisher and arts administrator. She is best known for being chief executive and publisher of Melbourne University Publishing (MUP) from 2003 to 2019, and as director of Adelaide Writers' Week from 2023 until her resignation in January 2026. Over a career spanning academia, journalism, radio and book publishing, she became one of the most prominent, and at times most divisive, figures in Australian literary life. Her career has been marked by recurring public controversy, including disputes over her commercial reshaping of MUP and, at Adelaide Writers' Week, repeated rows over the programming of writers in the debate over Israel and Palestine. As of 2026, she is 72 years old.

== Early life and family ==
Adler was born in Melbourne on 3 March 1954 to Jacques and Ruth Adler, Jewish immigrants from Paris, France, who arrived in Australia in 1949. The family history was shaped by the Holocaust. Her father Jacques joined the French Resistance during the Second World War after his own father, Simon Adlersztejn, was rounded up and deported to Beaune-la-Rolande, later dying at Auschwitz. Her mother Ruth had been taken to France as a seven-year-old by parents fleeing Nazi Germany; most of her extended family were murdered during the Holocaust. In Melbourne, Ruth worked as a schoolteacher, and Jacques was a research fellow in the history department of the University of Melbourne. Adler has frequently identified herself publicly as the daughter of Holocaust survivors, a background she has said informs her views on free expression.

Adler grew up in Melbourne's Jewish community during the 1950s and 1960s, the child of a migrant, Holocaust-marked household in the postwar city. She attended Elwood Primary School, the Elsternwick campus of Methodist Ladies' College, and Mount Scopus Memorial College. After matriculation, she first studied in Israel before moving to the United Kingdom. She graduated with a Bachelor of Arts from the University of Reading, and completed a Master of Arts and a Master of Philosophy at Columbia University in New York, studying under the Palestinian American literary theorist Edward Said in the late 1970s. Said, who was then developing the arguments of his landmark study Orientalism (1978), was a formative influence on her intellectual outlook and, by her own account, on her long engagement with the question of Palestine. He appointed her his teaching assistant for three years, and she later recalled him as a generous mentor and "charisma incarnate".

== Academic and media career ==
In 1980, after returning to Melbourne from New York City, Adler became a literature tutor at the University of Melbourne. From 1988 to 1989, she was editor of the Australian Book Review, and from 1989 to 1994, publishing director of Reed Books Australia. She then became arts and entertainment editor for The Age, a period marked by public friction with colleagues, including theatre critic Len Radic, over a review she had written. From 1996, she worked for ABC Radio, presenting the program Arts Today, before becoming the inaugural Deputy Director (Academic and Research) at the Victorian College of the Arts in 1999.

From around 1999 she served as a council member of Monash University, and was the university's Deputy Chancellor from 2010 to 2013. In 2021, she was appointed a Vice-Chancellor's Professorial Fellow at Monash, a leadership role carrying the title of professor; the appointment concluded on 17 March 2023.

== Melbourne University Publishing ==
Adler became chief executive and publisher of Melbourne University Publishing in 2003. Under the tagline "Books with Spine", she moved the century-old press well beyond a traditional scholarly remit toward a commercial model built on current-affairs and political non-fiction, publishing roughly two trade books—memoirs, biographies and works by politicians, journalists and public figures—for every academic monograph. Its list came to include the literary magazine Meanjin, political titles by figures such as former prime ministers Gough Whitlam and Tony Abbott, and, under the Victory Books imprint, the 2009 autobiography of Melbourne underworld figure Mick Gatto; the press recorded record profits in 2017. Supporters credited Adler with bringing scholarship into public debate; critics argued the commercial turn strayed from the mission of a university press.

In May 2017, MUP published ABC journalist Louise Milligan's Cardinal: The Rise and Fall of George Pell, an investigation into child sexual abuse allegations against Cardinal George Pell. The book won a Walkley Award and sold strongly, but in June 2017 MUP withdrew it from sale in Victoria after Victoria Police charged Pell with historical sexual offences; it returned to Victorian shops in February 2019. The University of Melbourne subsequently ordered a review of MUP. The university's chancellor, Allan Myers, had been Pell's counsel at the royal commission into institutional child sexual abuse and was reported to have privately criticised the decision to publish the book, although the university said its plans for MUP were unrelated to the Pell title.

In December 2018 the university resolved to return MUP to being a "high quality scholarly press", and in January 2019 Adler resigned after fifteen years, together with the chair and five independent directors—among them former New South Wales premier Bob Carr and former Human Rights Commission president Gillian Triggs—who said editorial independence would be at risk under the new direction. Commentators differed over the cause: some pointed to the Pell book as a catalyst, while the university framed the change as a return to core scholarly business. Milligan called Adler's departure "terrible news for Australian writers".

== Hachette and Adelaide Writers' Week ==
In September 2019 Adler was appointed publisher-at-large at Hachette Australia. In December 2021 she was named director of Adelaide Writers' Week, the largest free literary festival in Australia, succeeding Jo Dyer on a three-year appointment covering the 2023 to 2025 events. She stepped away from Hachette to take up the role and curated her first program around the theme of truth, featuring writers such as J. M. Coetzee, playwright David Hare and filmmaker Terence Davies.

=== 2023 festival ===
Adler's tenure was marked by disputes over the inclusion of writers critical of Israel. Ahead of the 2023 festival, her programming of Palestinian American author Susan Abulhawa and Palestinian poet Mohammed el-Kurd drew objections: el-Kurd had likened Israel to the Nazi regime, and Abulhawa had tweeted "DeNazify Ukraine", an argument Russia had used to justify its invasion of Ukraine. Three Ukrainian writers withdrew from the festival, the law firm MinterEllison ended its sponsorship, and Morry Schwartz said Adler had platformed hate speech and called for her to resign. Adler declined to disinvite the writers, saying "I'm not running a political festival here, I'm running a literary festival", and stated that authors were chosen for their writing rather than their social-media posts and that criticism of Israel is not antisemitism. South Australian Premier Peter Malinauskas said he had come under pressure to defund the program but declined, warning that doing so would move the state toward censorship.

=== 2024: Thomas Friedman ===
A further dispute concerned the Jewish American columnist Thomas Friedman, who had been programmed to appear at the 2024 festival by video link. In February 2024 Randa Abdel-Fattah and nine other academics wrote to the festival asking that his invitation be withdrawn over a New York Times column in which he compared some Middle Eastern groups to insect vermin requiring eradication. The board publicly affirmed its support for Friedman's participation, and its chair, Tracey Whiting, said he did not appear because of a scheduling conflict. Friedman later said that he had been told the timing would not work out. In January 2026, former board member Tony Berg, a former governor of the Australia–Israel Chamber of Commerce, alleged that Adler, together with festival director Ruth Mackenzie and chief executive Kath Mainland, had given the board an "ultimatum" to disinvite Friedman or they would resign. Berg said the episode was evidence that Adler's defence of free expression was selective. Adler rejected the accusation and said that objecting to Friedman's appearance was not a denial of his free speech since he was "a New York Times columnist, a figure at the heart of the journalism establishment", while Abdel-Fattah was "a Palestinian academic and author who despite being at the centre of the saga and despite being a respected scholar and award-winning writer, she’s unable to get an opinion piece published in a mainstream media outlet".

=== 2026 resignation and festival cancellation ===
Adler was again director, and initially chair, of the 2026 edition of the festival. On 8 January 2026 the Adelaide Festival board announced it had cancelled the scheduled appearance of Palestinian-Australian author and academic Randa Abdel-Fattah, stating that including her would "not be culturally sensitive" so soon after the 2025 Bondi Beach shooting, citing unspecified "past statements". The decision, which appeared to override Adler's own position, triggered one of the largest boycotts in the festival's history: by mid-January around 180 writers, commentators and academics had withdrawn—among them former New Zealand prime minister Jacinda Ardern, novelists Zadie Smith and Percival Everett, and Australian author Helen Garner—and all but one member of the Adelaide Festival board had resigned. Adler said about 70 per cent of the program's speakers had pulled out.

On 13 January 2026 Adler announced her resignation in an opinion piece for Guardian Australia, writing that she could not be "party to silencing writers" and describing the board's decision as a threat to free speech. The entire 2026 Writers' Week was cancelled the same day; a reconstituted board led by former festival chair Judy Potter was announced, and on 15 January the Adelaide Festival apologised to Abdel-Fattah and invited her to appear at Adelaide Writers' Week in 2027.

== Board and public roles ==
Adler has held numerous governance and advisory positions in Australian cultural and educational life. She served on the boards of the Melbourne International Arts Festival, the Australian Centre for Contemporary Art and the Monash University Museum of Art. From 2010 to 2013 she was deputy chair of the Book Industry Strategy Group and the Book Industry Collaborative Council. In 2015 she was president of the Australian Publishers Association and was appointed by Tony Abbott to chair the fiction and poetry judging of the Prime Minister's Literary Awards, an appointment itself criticised as politically motivated.

As chairperson of the board of her former school, Methodist Ladies' College, Adler was at the centre of a high-profile dispute in 2012 when the board terminated the employment of principal Rosa Storelli over historic salary sacrifice arrangements, following an audit suggesting Storelli had been overpaid more than A$700,000 across ten years. The dismissal angered many parents, prompting a public meeting that called for the board's resignation and Storelli's reinstatement, and received extensive media coverage. Adler's final year on the board was 2015.

== Views on Israel and Palestine ==
A Jewish critic of Israeli government policy, Adler has been a prominent voice in Australian debates over Israel and Palestine, a perspective she has partly traced to her studies under Edward Said. She has signed public letters critical of Israel, including one calling for targeted sanctions against supporters of what it termed an "apartheid regime", and in 2021 was associated with the publication of journalist John Lyons's Dateline Jerusalem: Journalism's Toughest Assignment in a Monash University Publishing series. As of January 2026, she is a member of the advisory committee of the Jewish Council of Australia, an organisation representing non-Zionist Australian Jews that advocates human rights for Palestinians.

Adler's positions strained some longstanding relationships within the Australian Jewish community. Michael Gawenda, former editor-in-chief of The Age and a friend of several decades, made the end of their friendship the opening of his 2023 memoir My Life as a Jew. He dated the rupture to October 2021, writing that he had told Adler he felt betrayed after she commissioned the Lyons book; an edited extract appeared in The Sydney Morning Herald under the headline "The day my friendship with Louise Adler ended".

== Honours and recognition ==
In the 2008 Australia Day Honours, Adler was appointed a Member of the Order of Australia for "service to literature as a publisher, through support for and the promotion of emerging authors, to tertiary education, and to the community". In 2015 she received an honorary doctorate from Monash University in recognition of her contribution to Australian publishing, emerging authors, education and the community.

== Personal life ==
Adler married the actor and comedian Max Gillies in 1981. The couple have two adult children.
