= K. A. Ren Wyld =

Aboriginal Australian writer

- Born: Karen Wyld; South Australia
- Education: University of Technology Sydney (MA)
- Occupation: Writer
- Known for: Where the Fruit Falls (2020); Heroes, Rebels and Innovators : Inspiring Aboriginal and Torres Strait Islander People from History (2021)

K. A. Ren Wyld, also known as Ren Wyld, and formerly Karen Wyld, is an Aboriginal Australian writer of fiction, non-fiction, and poetry. They are known for their 2020 novel, Where the Fruit Falls, and their 2021 non-fiction picture book for children, Heroes, Rebels and Innovators: Inspiring Aboriginal and Torres Strait Islander People from History.

== Early life and education ==
Wyld was born in South Australia, of Martu descent. Their grandmother's Country lies in the Pilbara, Western Australia.

Wyld earned a Master of Arts by research from University of Technology Sydney for their 2024 thesis "In Search of Blak Magic: Magic Realism ~ Aboriginal Novels".

== Career ==
=== Writing ===
Wyld writes fiction and non-fiction, some of which examines aspects of colonisation, displacement, the Stolen Generations, and Indigenous rights in Australia. Their first published novel was When Rosa Came Home in December 2013. Since then, they have published essays, book reviews, short stories, poetry, and a second novel.

In June 2019, Wyld's review of four novels, including Tony Birch's The White Girl and Melissa Lucashenko's Too Much Lip, was published in Meanjin.

Wyld's 2020 novel, Where the Fruit Falls, is set in South Australia and was published by UWA Publishing. Where the Fruit Falls won the Dorothy Hewett Award for an Unpublished Manuscript.

In 2021, Wyld's non-fiction picture book for children, Heroes, Rebels and Innovators: Inspiring Aboriginal and Torres Strait Islander People from History, illustrated by Mununjali and Fijian illustrator Jaelyn Biumaiwai, was published. The book tells the stories of seven Aboriginal and Torres Strait Islander people during the years of early first contact with colonists. Among these are Dharug woman Patyegarang, who taught her language to the colonists at Sydney Cove in 1791, and the heroes of Gundagai, Yarri and Jacky Jacky, two Wiradjuri men who saved up to 70 settlers from drowning in a disastrous flood in 1852.

In 2024, an anthology of poetry and prose called The Rocks Remain: Blak Poetry and Story was published by Wakefield Press, co-edited by Wyld and Dominic Guerrera.

In 2025, Wyld co-edited an issue of Southerly with Roanna Gonsalves.

=== Appearances and other roles ===
In 2023, Wyld joined Palestinian American writer Susan Abulhawa and Wiradjuri and Gamilaroi writer and broadcaster Lorna Munro on a panel at Adelaide Writers' Week.

They appeared at Adelaide Writers' Week again in March 2025.

After Adelaide Writers' Week was cancelled in 2026 owing to a boycott by authors following the disinvitation of Palestinian Australian author Randa Abdel-Fattah, an event was organised by local community groups in its wake, called "Constellations: Not Writers' Week". Wyld programmed an afternoon of discussions titled "Rivers of Reason: Blak & Arab Writers in Conversation", and also appeared on another panel, titled "When We Refuse: Cultural boycotts, artist strikes and creative solidarity".

=== Rescindment of award ===
Wyld made national headlines in May 2025 when, just hours before the ceremony in Brisbane on 20 May at which they were to receive one of two black&write! writing fellowships from the State Library of Queensland (SLQ), the award was rescinded on the instruction of Queensland arts minister John-Paul Langbroek. The decision was based on a 2024 tweet by Wyld about the killing of Hamas leader Yahya Sinwar by Israel, in which they called him a "martyr" and praised him for "resisting colonisation". They later said that they were not fully aware who Sinwar was at the time, and thought that they had deleted the tweet afterwards. The fellowship had been awarded for Wyld's unpublished manuscript for a novel entitled Whichway Shimmering Dust, written to highlight that the "Bringing Them Home" report on the Stolen Generations was published nearly 28 years earlier, but only 6 per cent of the recommendations had so far been actioned.

Following the announcement, several panel judges for the Queensland Literary Awards resigned, including Jeanine Leane and writer and critic Nigel Featherstone. The Australian Society of Authors issued a statement condemning the action of the government. An open letter addressed to SLQ and the arts minister, signed by many notable First Nations writers as well as non-Indigenous allies, demanded "an immediate apology be offered to Ren Wyld and to the black&write! team, and for the fellowship to be reinstated in full".

== Personal life ==
Wyld uses the pronouns they/their. Formerly known as Karen Wyld, they use the name K.A. Ren Wyld professionally. Their X handle is Ren Wyld and they are also referred to by others by this name.

Wyld lives on the south coast of South Australia.

== Recognition and awards ==
=== For works ===
- Where the Fruit Falls
  - 2017: Shortlisted, Richell Prize for Emerging Writers
  - 2020: Dorothy Hewett Award for an Unpublished Manuscript
  - 2021: Longlisted, Australian Book Industry Awards (ABIA) — Small Publishers' Adult Book of the Year
  - 2021: Shortlisted, Victorian Premier's Literary Award for Indigenous Writing, in the Victorian Premier's Literary Awards
- Heroes, Rebels and Innovators: Inspiring Aboriginal and Torres Strait Islander People from History (2021)
  - 2022: Shortlisted, Speech Pathology Australia Book of the Year Awards — 8-10 Years
  - 2022: Shortlisted, Speech Pathology Australia Book of the Year Awards — Indigenous Children
  - 2022: Shortlisted, Booksellers' Choice Award — Children's Book of the Year
  - 2022: Honour book, CBCA Book of the Year Awards — Eve Pownall Award for Information Books
  - 2022: Longlisted, ABIA — Australian Book of the Year for Younger Children

=== Other awards ===
- 2020: Inaugural winner, First Nations Writing Award
- 2022: Adelaide Festival Awards for Literature, South Australian Literary Awards — Tangkanungku Pintyanthi Fellowship for "Lovely's Valley"
- 2022: Australia Council Grants, Awards and Fellowships
- 2023: Neilma Sidney Literary Travel Fund, "for travel to Western Australia to research archives and exhibitions, experience immersive site visits and a self-hosted writer’s retreat, as well as travel to Philadelphia, USA, to attend "Palestine Writes" and participate in mentoring with Palestinian novelist Susan Abulhawa"
- 2024: SA Literary Fellowship (First Nations)
- 2025: Shortlisted, black&write! Indigenous Writing Fellowship, for Whichway Shimmering Dust (won but rescinded, see above)
