= Bendigo Writers Festival boycott =

2025 boycott in Australia

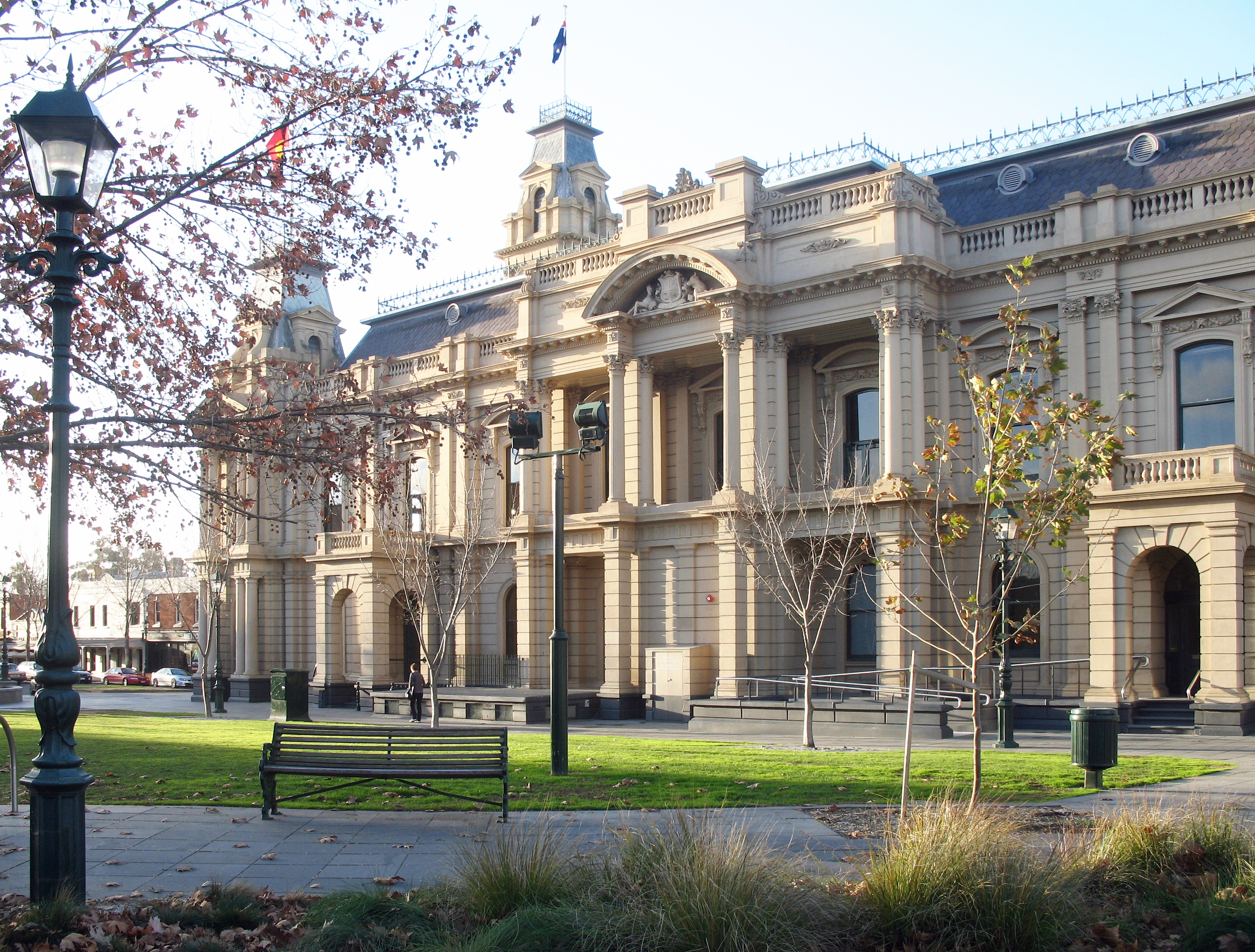
Bendigo Town Hall. The writers' festival, which had a third of scheduled sessions cancelled, was held in the city of Bendigo.

The Bendigo Writers Festival boycott occurred in August 2025 over a code of conduct adopted by the festival held in Bendigo, Australia, and operated by the City of Greater Bendigo. The code mandated that speakers at the Bendigo Writers Festival avoid divisive topics and that those speaking at events hosted by La Trobe University comply with the university's anti-racism plan, which had adopted a broad definition of antisemitism construed to include anti-Zionist criticism of Israel. More than 50 writers and academics withdrew from the festival, including Randa Abdel-Fattah, an Australian academic of Palestinian descent, and Evelyn Araluen, a First Nations poet, stating that the code of conduct would stifle their freedom of expression. When the festival was held from 15 to 17 August 2025, around a third of events in the scheduled program were cancelled due to the boycott.

In the aftermath of the boycott, the decision to adopt the code of conduct was criticised by a number of groups and individuals, including the Australian Society of Authors and the festival's founder and inaugural director, Rosemary Sorensen. A review of the event resulted in the Greater Bendigo City Council passing a motion to place the festival on a one-year hiatus and express "sincere regret" for the impacts of the code of conduct.

== Background ==
The Bendigo Writers Festival was first held in 2012. It is now owned and operated by the City of Greater Bendigo. Since it began, the festival had been held yearly, aside from 2020 when the festival was cancelled due to the COVID-19 pandemic. Rosemary Sorensen was the director of the festival from 2012 until 2023. Following Sorensen's resignation, no dedicated festival director was appointed, with events at the festival being organised by a number of people, including Clare Wright, a professor at La Trobe University who acted as the co-curator for "La Trobe Presents" events at the festival.

== Boycott ==
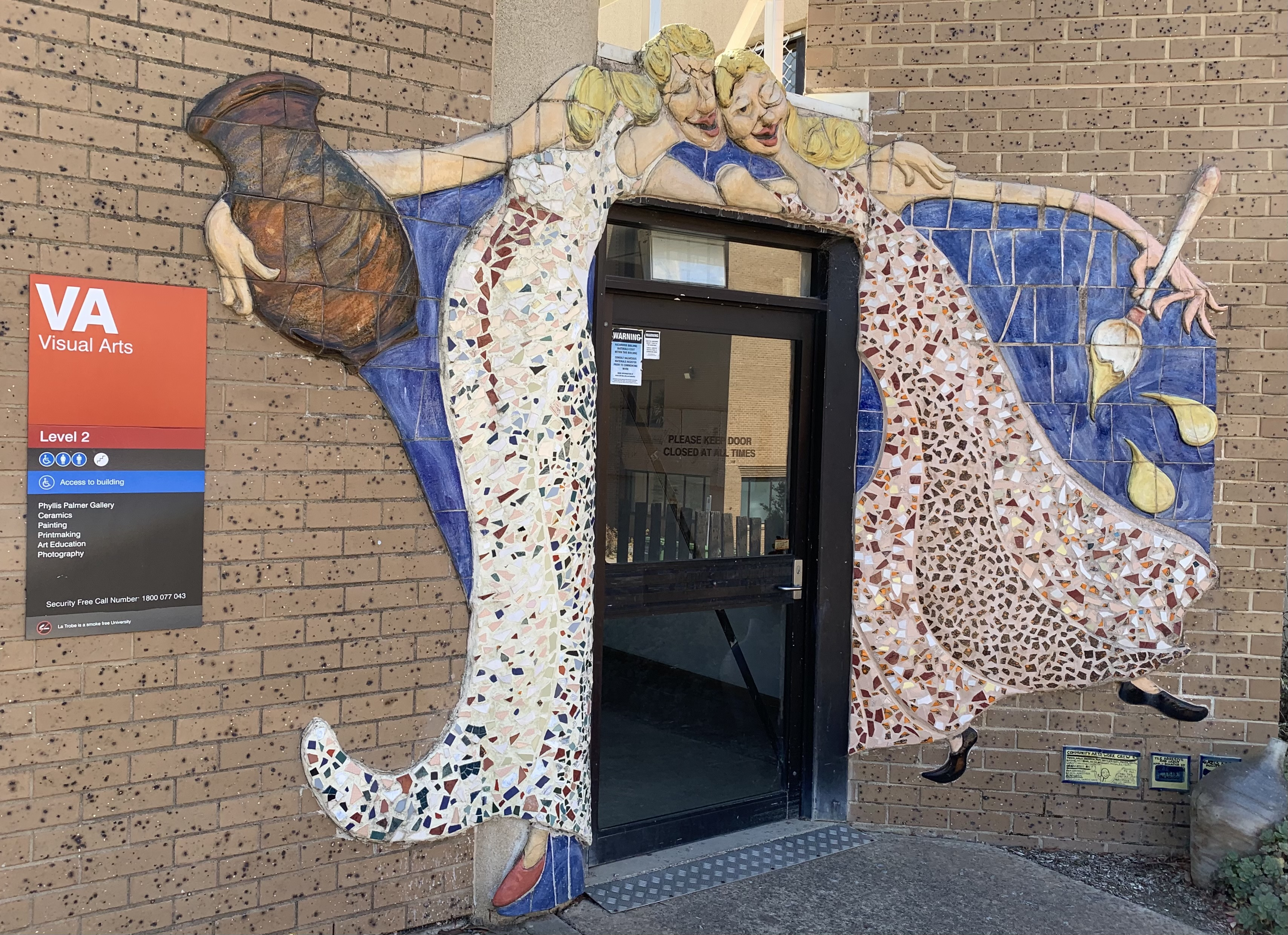
A building at the La Trobe University campus in Bendigo. The university hosted a number of panels at the festival.

A code of conduct was distributed to a number of planned speakers at the Bendigo Writers Festival on 13 August 2025, two days before the festival was set to begin. The code of conduct required participants to avoid discussing "language or topics that could be considered inflammatory, divisive, or disrespectful". Additionally, for speakers involved in La Trobe Presents panels, compliance with the university's anti-racism plan was mandated. La Trobe University abides by the Universities Australia definition of antisemitism, which declares that Zionism is a core part of Jewish identity for "most, but not all Jewish Australians" and also that using the word "Zionist" in place of "Jew" does not preclude antisemitic speech. This led to many writers and academics who had planned to appear at the festival deciding to boycott the event, including Randa Abdel-Fattah, Evelyn Araluen, Jeanine Leane, Kate Mildenhall, Jess Hill, Thomas Mayo and Claire G. Coleman. Wright also withdrew from the festival for "personal and professional reasons" which involved the introduction of the code of conduct. In total, more than 50 speakers withdrew from the festival. Bookish, a Bendigo-based bookstore which had sold books at three previous editions of the festival, also withdrew from the event due to concerns over the perceived censorship effects of the code of conduct. Prior to her withdrawal, Abdel-Fattah was set to appear on a panel titled "On Reckonings", speaking about her novel Discipline. According to Dee Jefferson of The Guardian, Discipline "reflects on the silencing of Palestinians in academia and the media".

Abdel-Fattah cited her Palestinian identity as a key reason for boycotting the festival, stating that she would be required to "engage in complete self-censorship". Araluen stated that she had a responsibility to speak out against Israeli campaigns of genocide against Palestinians, which she described as "ongoing" and "UN-defined". She added that the definition of antisemitism went against her freedom of speech and "cultural duty as a First Nations woman". Following approaches from speakers at the festival, the Human Rights Law Centre wrote to the Bendigo Writers Festival expressing concerns over the code of conduct.

For the festival, held from 15 to 17 August, the boycott resulted in the cancellation of a large number of events, including its opening night gala. On the festival's opening day, 21 sessions were cancelled and refunded by event organisers as a result of writers withdrawing. A 16 August statement from the Greater Bendigo City Council said that "more than half" of the festival's program would be held by its conclusion. Ultimately, the boycott contributed to the withdrawal of 53 participants from the festival, with 22 sessions being cancelled, totalling a third of the planned program.

== Reactions and aftermath ==
The organisers of the Bendigo Writers Festival issued a statement emphasising their commitment to open and respectful debate and discussion, stating that the code of conduct was typical of other writers' festivals and necessary for the safety and wellbeing of panelists and attendees. A representative of La Trobe University stated that the university wanted to make the event "safe, inclusive and equitable for all members of our community".

The Australian Society of Authors condemned the code of conduct, saying that writers' festivals should not be in the business of policing the speech of authors, with deputy chair Jennifer Mills stating that the code at the Bendigo Writers Festival was created to make writers "fearful and nervous". Sorensen, the former organiser of the festival, was critical of the decision to introduce a code of conduct, describing it as unnecessary and a "authoritarian abuse of power". A number of other writers' festival organisers concurred with the criticisms expressed by the boycotters, with representatives of the Sydney and Queenscliffe festivals praising the authors for advocating in favour of freedom of expression. Speaking to The Australian newspaper, author and journalist Michael Gawenda described the code of conduct as "ludicrous", stating that limitations should not be placed on the speech of writers.

It was reported on 18 August that the Australian Academic Alliance Against Antisemitism sent a letter to the Bendigo Writers Festival organisers on 21 July 2025 expressing concerns over the invitation of Randa Abdel-Fattah, describing her as "a direct threat to the Jewish community in Australia" due to her anti-Zionist views. The letter was published in full by news organisation Deepcut. Abdel-Fattah responded by stating that the festival and university had entertained defamatory smears against her and described the authors of the letter as a "pro-Israel lobby group".

The boycott resulted in financial losses for a number of businesses in Bendigo, some of which had ordered extra stock for the festival. Foot traffic in the city was lower than expected during the weekend of the festival.

Abdel-Fattah lodged a complaint with the Victorian Civil and Administrative Tribunal against Greater Bendigo City Council and La Trobe University in July 2026, alleging that she had been discriminated against on the basis of political belief or activity.

=== Review ===
Andrew Cooney, CEO of the City of Greater Bendigo, announced on 19 August at a council meeting that there would be a review of the 2025 writers' festival. At a Greater Bendigo City Council meeting on 15 September, Victorian Socialists councillor Owen Cosgriff called for greater transparency from the council on the circumstances that led to the boycott, saying that decisions of the council in advance of the code of conduct release had not been fully revealed. Cosgriff added that the code of conduct and resultant boycott had caused great damage to Bendigo's reputation. The review began in October 2025, with a public survey released to solicit feedback from attendees, writers and local stakeholders. On behalf of the City of Greater Bendigo, Cooney stated that "the 2025 festival was not the festival we wanted to hold".

The review, released in December 2025, recommended a one-year hiatus for the festival. Citing public feedback, the report stated there was a desire from residents to see the festival continue, but determined that delivering the festival in 2026 without operational changes would "only exacerbate the reputational damage incurred in 2025". On 15 December 2025, Greater Bendigo City Council voted for a resolution which confirmed the festival would return in 2027, and which expressed "sincere regret" for the impact the code of conduct had on writers such as Abdel-Fattah, as well as local businesses and other participants in the festival.

== See also ==
- Adelaide Writers' Week boycott
- List of boycotts
- State Library Victoria Teen Writing Bootcamp controversy
