= The Blue Between Sky and Water =

2015 book by Susan Abulhawa

- Author: Susan Abulhawa
- Language: English
- Genre: Historical fiction
- Publication date: September 1, 2015
- Media type: Print (Hardback)
- Pages: 293 pages
- ISBN: 978-1-632-86221-1

The Blue Between Sky and Water is a book written by Palestinian author Susan Abulhawa. The book is Abulhawa's second novel and was sold in 19 languages before its release and was published in English in 2015. The book navigates the experience of three generations of Palestinian women after the Nakba.

== Content ==
=== Nazmiyeh ===
The story begins in the village of Bayt Daras with the onset of the Nakba. Nazmiyeh's family home is stormed while she is alone with her younger sister. She is raped by Jewish guerilla forces who then proceed to kill her sister in front of her. Eventually the family flees to Gaza, where Nazmiyeh marries her childhood lover, within a few months, though she never reveals to anyone about the instance of the rape. Her first-born child, a boy, has blue eyes. The boy grows into a resistance fighter who is imprisoned in Israel.

=== Nur ===
Nazmiyeh's brother moves to America seeking better opportunities. He and his American wife have one son, Michael, who has completely lost his connection to his Palestinian identity. Michael has a daughter, Nur, who spends the most time with her grandpa, following her dad's death in a car accident. Following her grandpa's death from illness, Nur is taken back in by her American mother who ends up marrying another man, who subsequently abuses Nur.

Nur decides to go back to Gaza where she is able to find Nazmiyeh and reconnects with her homeland. The novel ends with Nur celebrating with Nazmiyeh as Israel announces a prisoner release and there is hope that Nazmiyeh's son might be among those released.

== Reception ==
Dorothy Reno, writing for the Washington Independent Review of Books, states that the book's readers are "charmed by Abulhawa’s glittering language". Imogen Edge-Partington, writing for The Student, attributes the novel's success to "its many dimensions and its intricate complexity".

Atef Abu Saif, reviewing the novel for The Guardian, described it as "not only a story about displacement. It takes in love, hatred, sex, rape, survival, death, loss and belonging. It is full of celebratory dances, partying on the beach, mourning, fear, mysteries, dirty jokes and national heroism."

Margie Orford, writing for The Independent, describes the author's voice in the book as "a voice that returns to the world the stories of Palestine that we ignore at our peril".
