= Jennifer Mills =

Australian writer

- Born: 1977 (age 48–49)
- Occupations: Novelist, short story writer, poet

Jennifer Mills (born 1977), also published as jenjen, is an Australian novelist, short story writer, and poet. She is based in Adelaide, South Australia.

== Early life ==
Jennifer Mills was born in 1977.

== Career ==
=== Writing ===
Mills' fifth novel, Salvage, was published in 2025. The Guardian described it as a "beautifully structured novel, complex but never messy". Australian Book Review described it as a masterful example of dystopian fiction.

Her work has appeared in Meanjin, Island Magazine, Overland, HEAT, the Griffith Review, and The Lifted Brow, as well as anthologies such as Best Australian Stories, and New Australian Stories.

Mills has written zines and comics under the name of "jenjen".

=== Other roles ===
Mills has served as the fiction editor at Overland and a board firector for the Australian Society of Authors.

In 2025, she became chair of the Australian Society of Authors.

Mills was scheduled to appear at 2026 Adelaide Writers' Week, which was cancelled after a boycott by most authors, following the rescindment of Randa Abdel-Fattah's invitation to the event by the Adelaide Festival Board. She is one of the organisers of a one-off festival called Constellations, under the auspices of Writers SA and independent publishers Pink Shorts.

== Recognition and awards ==
Mills was the winner of the 2008 Marian Eldridge Award for Young Emerging Women Writers, the Pacific Region of the 2008-9 Commonwealth Short Story Competition, and the 2008 Northern Territory Literary Awards: Best Short Story. She was shortlisted for the 2009 Manchester Fiction Prize.

Her novel The Diamond Anchor was highly commended for the Dobbie Award, and she has won both the Marian Eldridge Award and the Barbara Hanrahan Fellowship.

In 2012, Mills was named one of The Sydney Morning Herald's Best Young Australian Novelists. Her essay, Swimming with Aliens, was shortlisted for the 2017 Horne Prize.

Her 2018 novel, Dyschronia, was shortlisted for the 2019 Miles Franklin Award and the 2019 Adelaide Festival Awards for Literature – Fiction.

Her 2025 novel, Salvage, was shortlisted for the fiction category of The Age Book of the Year Awardsin 2026.

== Personal life ==
Mills previously lived in Alice Springs, Northern Territory, before moving to Adelaide, South Australia.

== Bibliography ==
=== Novels ===
- The Diamond Anchor (University of Queensland Press, 2009)
- Gone (University of Queensland Press, 2011)
- Dyschronia (Picador Australia, 2018)
- The Airways (Picador Australia, 2021)
- Salvage (Picador, 2025)

=== Short fiction ===
Collections

- The Rest is Weight (University of Queensland Press, 2012, ISBN 9780702249402)

Individual stories

- "Extra time", Overland, Volume 194, Autumn 2009

=== Poetry ===
Chapbooks

- Treading Earth (Press Press, 2009)

=== Selected non-fiction ===
- "Spanners and mirages", pp. 107–118, in: Destroying the joint, edited by Jane Caro, Read How You Want (2015, ISBN 9781459687295).
- "A distant leviathan : Robbie Arnott's realist new novel", Australian Book Review, volume 447, 2022
