= Mornings in Jenin =

2010 novel by Susan Abulhawa

Mornings In Jenin
- First edition (original title)
- Author: Susan Abulhawa
- Original title: The Scar of David
- Language: English and other languages
- Genre: Novel
- Publisher: Journey Publications (2006); Bloomsbury Feb 1, 2010
- Publication place: United States
- Media type: Paperback
- Pages: 331 pp
- ISBN: 978-1-60819-046-1

Mornings in Jenin (2010, U.S.; originally published as The Scar of David, 2006, U.S.; and Les Matins de Jénine, France) is a novel by author Susan Abulhawa.

== Background ==
Mornings in Jenin was originally published in the United States in 2006 as The Scar of David. The novel was translated into French and published as Les Matins de Jenin. It was then translated into 27 languages. Bloomsbury Publishing reissued the novel in the United States as Mornings in Jenin (February, 2010) after slight editing.

Mornings in Jenin is the first mainstream novel in English to explore life in post-1948 Palestine. The novel was partially inspired by the Ghassan Kanafani novel Return to Haifa.

Filmworks Dubai bought the film rights to Mornings in Jenin, planning to begin production in late 2013. Anna Soler-Pont, head of the Pontas agency, which sold the film rights to the novel, said: "This is going to be a special project. There aren't any epic films on Palestine yet." However, the producer died shortly after and the rights reverted to her.

== Critical reception ==
=== Reviews ===
Anjali Joseph of The Independent writes that "Susan Abulhawa's novel, first published in the US in 2006 but since reworked, follows the Abulheja family, Yehya and Basima and their two sons, in Ein Hod, a village in Palestine. The pastoral opening crams into 40 pages a cross-faith friendship, a love story (both brothers fall for Dalia, who marries the elder son, Hasan), a death, the Zionist invasion of the village, and the theft of one of Hasan and Dalia's sons, the infant Ismael, by an Israeli soldier. He gives the child to his wife, a Polish Holocaust survivor. Usefully for narrative purposes, the baby, renamed David, has a scar on his face "that would eventually lead him to his truth". From these beginnings, which promise a Middle Eastern Catherine Cookson's story, a fine novel emerges."

Abdullah Khan of The Hindu comments that what struck him most is "the honesty of the author’s voice. Despite being born to Palestinian refugees of the Six Day War of 1967, she has tried hard not to let her personal feelings fill the text. All individual Jewish characters are portrayed in sympathetic light. Nowhere in the story has she lost the touch of humanity. Another bright aspect of Susan’s writing is her ornamental use of language in the tradition of contemporary Arabic writing."

Robin Yassin-Kassab of The Sunday Times suggests that at "times you want to criticise Abulhawa for laying the tragedy on too thick, but her raw material is historical fact and her blend of fiction and documentary is one of the book’s strengths. What rescues Mornings in Jenin from polemic is its refusal to wallow or to stoop to tribalism. One of its many achievements is that, for such a necessarily political work, no character becomes a mere cipher for suffering or victimhood. Although the novel is written according to Anglo-American conventions, it echoes the poetic prose that is a feature of contemporary Arabic writing. Abulhawa effectively communicates her bubbling joy in what she calls 'the dance' of Arabic, pondering the language’s intricate courtesies and imagistic flair."

=== Controversy ===
In 2007, a live reading of The Scar of David was later reduced to only a book signing by the Barnes & Noble store in Bayside, New York. Barnes & Noble stated that the change was made for the safety of the author, also noting a need for “sensitivity” to the Jewish community.

The French author and philosopher Bernard-Henri Lévy called Mornings in Jenin "a concentration of anti-Israeli and anti-Jewish clichés masquerading as fiction". Abulhawa responded by dismissing Levy as a "French pop star of philosophy and intellectual elitism" and accusing him of "name-calling", adding:

He simply slaps on the word “antisemitism” to discredit any negative portrayal of Israel. This word — with its profound gravity of marginalization, humiliation, dispossession, oppression, and ultimately, genocide of human beings for no other reason but their religion — is so irresponsibly used by the likes of Levy that it truly besmirches the memory of those who were murdered in death camps solely for being Jewish...Mr. Levy accuses us of “demonizing Israel”, when in fact, all we do is pull back the curtain, however slightly, to show a dark truth he wishes to keep hidden. I suspect that Mr Levy feels, as most Jewish supporters of Israel do, that he is more entitled to my grandfather’s farms than I am. After all, that is really the foundation of Israel, isn’t it? The question that should be asked is “why?” and “how?” Why should Jews from all over the world be entitled to enjoy dual citizenship, both in their own homeland and in mine, while we, the natives of Palestine, languish in refugee camps, a diaspora, or patrolled ghettos and bantustans?

Lawrence Davidson discussed the controversy and defended Abulhawa and praised her book, saying: "It is a stark tragedy that, as of the moment, power is the deciding factor in the Israeli-Palestinian conflict. For, as history teaches us, power has little regard for fairness, justice, morality, and decent futures. If you want insight into these sort of things you best consult the work of Susan Abulhawa, for you will not find them in the words of her critics."
