= Adelaide Writers' Week =

Australian writers' festival

Adelaide Writers' Week (AWW), known locally as Writers' Week or WW, is a large and mostly free literary festival held annually in Adelaide, the capital of South Australia in February and March. It forms part of the Adelaide Festival of Arts and comes under its governance. Writers' Week is held outdoors in the Pioneer Women's Memorial Garden, where attendees meet, listen, and discuss literature with Australian and international writers in "Meet the Author" sessions, readings, and lectures.

Each Adelaide Writers' Week includes six days of free panel-sessions presented live in the gardens, later made available online via podcast. Selected sessions are shown live via videolink in some libraries. There are also free events for children and young adults, at which children's authors present their work for a range of ages, and other activities take place. The programme also features a series of ticketed special events, both at Adelaide Festival time and throughout the year.

== History ==
The first Adelaide Writers' Week was held in 1960 as part of the Adelaide Festival of Arts, biennially in March. It is the longest-running dedicated writers' festival in Australia. The first event was organised by a committee headed by state librarian Hedley Brideson, in collaboration with the Fellowship of Australian Writers (SA). Initially intended as a forum for writers, the event soon became popular with the public, in particular when guests included famous writers such as Russian poet Yevgeni Yevtushenko in 1966, followed in the early 1970s by Anthony Burgess, Edna O'Brien, John Updike, and Allen Ginsberg. In those years it was held at the State Library and University of Adelaide, which proved too small to accommodate audiences, so in 1976 was moved to the Pioneer Women's Memorial Garden, alongside King William Road next to the Torrens Parade Ground. At this time, the event took place under one tent.

The event soon grew, and publishers were drawn by the commercial opportunities. In 1986 a second tent was added to allow two sessions to run contemporaneously. From 2012, along with the Festival, Writers' Week became an annual event, based on an election promise by Premier Mike Rann.

In some years, WW has been dedicated to a writer; these have included Colin Thiele, Thomas Shapcott, Margo Lanagan, Christopher Koch, Judith Wright, Jessica Anderson, A. D. Hope, and Alexis Wright.

It has grown bigger year by year. In 2014, graphic novels and comics, represented by their authors and illustrators, were showcased in a dedicated one-day program.

Palestinian-American author Susan Abulhawa, a participant of the 2023 Adelaide Writers' Week, had previously shared a tweet from Russian president Vladimir Putin stating "DeNazify Ukraine", and was critical of Ukraine president Volodymyr Zelenskyy, labelling him a "depraved Zionist" and "more dangerous than Putin". Maria Tumarkin, a Ukrainian-born Australian historian and writer, along with Ukrainian writers Olesya Khromeychuk and Kateryna Babkina, withdrew from the event in protest at Abulhawa's inclusion. The South Australian Government under Peter Malinauskas and the Association of Ukrainians in South Australia condemned Abulhawa's comments, and sponsor MinterEllison withdrew its support for the festival. Festival director Louise Adler responded, "Adelaide Writers' Week is not in the business of cancelling people whose opinions may be objectionable to other groups or individuals".

In its 40th edition in 2025, Writers' Week was attended by around 160,000 over the six days, breaking previous records.

=== 2026 boycott ===
On 8 January 2026, the Adelaide Festival Board announced that Palestinian Australian author Randa Abdel-Fattah's scheduled appearance at AWW had been cancelled, following a request from the Jewish Community Council of South Australia, due to concerns over "cultural sensitivity", following the December 2025 Bondi Beach shooting. The board's decision was supported by state premier Peter Malinauskas. There was immediate and strong backlash from writers and the public to this decision. After 180 participants, 6 of 7 board members, and the festival director had withdrawn or resigned, the event was completely cancelled on 13 January, with a new AF board announced later that day, led by former chair Judy Potter. AWW director Louise Adler resigned, and the whole event was cancelled.

A one-off festival titled titled "Constellations: Not Writers' Week", took place between 28 February and 5 March 2026, organised by Writers SA, Pink Shorts Press, along with other community groups and individuals. It included an "in conversation" event with Randa Abdel-Fattah and Louise Adler, which was sold out. Constellations also included a panel discussion entitled "When We Refuse: Cultural boycotts, artist strikes and creative solidarity".

== Description ==
Writers' Week is a mostly free daytime week-long literary festival held mostly outdoors in the shady Pioneer Women's Memorial Garden, north of Adelaide CBD. A few sessions have been held indoors in the evening, usually themed events with a panel of authors on stage. It is considered one of the world's pre-eminent literary events, described by literary magazine Kill Your Darlings (founded by writers Hannah Kent and Rebecca Starford) as "Arguably Australia’s most exciting and influential writers' festival". In 2022, 180 writers presented sessions: 119 in-person and 25 virtually.

A major event, it is a part of the Adelaide Festival and run by a dedicated Writers' Week director. Each Adelaide Writers' Week includes six days of free panel sessions presented live in the gardens. After each presentation, audience members are encouraged to ask questions, and lively debate sometimes ensues.

Each day starts with "Breakfast with Papers" in the West Tent, at 8am, sponsored by The Advertiser and hosted by journalists from Guardian Australia and the ABC. In 2024 this was hosted by Tory Shepherd of The Guardian and Jonathan Green of ABC Radio National. The programme also features a series of ticketed special events, both at festival time and throughout the year, and there is a free "Kids' Weekend", at which children's authors present their work for a range of ages and other activities are held. In recent years (to 2021), Saturday sessions in the Torrens Tent have been for younger children, while Sundays present books and authors for young adults. "Twilight Talks" are presented at 6:30 on some days for people who cannot get to the festival.

For those who are unable to attend the event, all East Stage sessions are livestreamed in some libraries, community centres, schools, aged care communities, and retirement villages. In 2022, 111 locations were covered. From 2021, the "Curated Dozen" – 13 sessions – were made available to be livestreamed at home on a pay-what-you-can basis. In addition, since 2021, most of the presentations have later been made available online via podcast.

In conjunction with Writers, Week, Writers SA hosts workshops for Adelaide writers, with visiting authors as special guests to help provide guidance.

Media coverage and advertising of the event is widespread across major media outlets as well as social media, and was estimated to reach a cumulative audience of more than 116 million people in 2022.

As well as being good entertainment for patrons, the festival has become an increasingly important marketing venue for publishers as well as authors. Representatives from major publishers around the world attend the event. Authors sign their books at scheduled times outside the Book Tent, where books by all attending authors are on sale. In 2024 there are three stages: East, West, and North Stages (with shade cover for presenters and audience), as well as the Book Tent and the Torrens Tent. Beverages and food are on sale in a separate tent, and there is a block of many portaloos. Plastic chairs are provided for the audiences, and events are run at all stages throughout each day of the festival. The programme is published in hardcopy and online before the event

Sponsorship of the event has varied through the years. In 1990, the major sponsors were the Literature Board of the Australia Council and SGIC; in 2024, major partners were the Government of South Australia, Adelaide Economic Development Agency, City of Adelaide, 9News, University of Adelaide, ECH, and The Advertiser, with additional sponsorship by a number of commercial sponsors and cultural institutions.

== Awards ==
=== MUD Literary Prize ===
The MUD Literary Prize has been awarded to an emerging talent for a debut novel at Writers' Week each year since 2018, and the MUD Literary Club, a philanthropic organisation dedicated to Australian literature, also sponsors an established author as well as an emerging author at the event each year.

=== Adelaide Festival Awards for Literature ===
The biennial Adelaide Festival Awards for Literature were created by the Government of South Australia in 1986, and awarded during Writers' Week. The State Library of South Australia (SLSA) took over administration of the awards from Arts South Australia in 2020, and ran the event for two years, during which they were run at 4pm on the last day of Writers' Week. Library director Geoff Strempel felt that the awards should be uncoupled from the event in order to give them greater prominence, in line with interstate equivalents, and so rebranded the awards the South Australian Literaray Awards, with the inaugural event taking place in October 2024.

== Directors ==
In the early years, the role of director of Writers' Week had various titles: in 1990, Angela Dawes was "Writers' Week Coordinator" and in 2008 Rose Wight was "executive producer".

Directors of Writers' Week have included:

- Angela Dawes (1980s)
- Rose Wight OAM (1992-2010) (Note: Rose Wight worked on every Adelaide Festival from 1982 until 2010. She died in August 2025. Tributes came from Louise Adler, Phillip Adams, and Greg Mackie.)
- Laura Kroetsch (2012–2018)
- Jo Dyer (2019–2022)
- Louise Adler (2023–2026)
- Rosemarie Milsom (May 2026–present) (Note: Formerly journalist, broadcaster, and founding director of the Newcastle Writers' Festival.)

== Featured writers by year ==
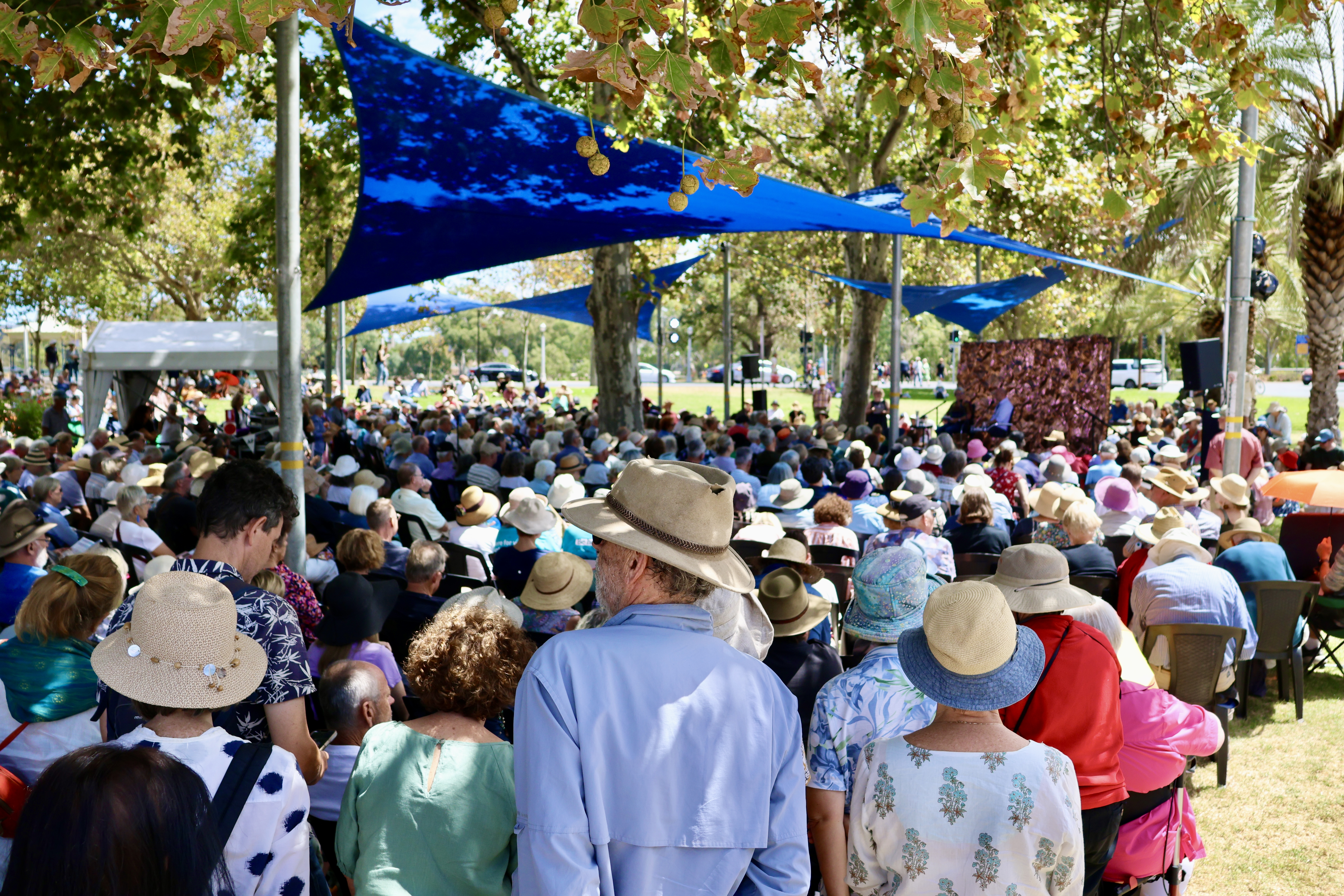
2025 Adelaide Writers' Week

=== 2026 ===
Most featured writers boycotted the festival owing to the rescindment of the invitation to Palestinian Australian writer Randa Abdel-Fattah. See above in History.

=== 2024 ===
The 2024 event took place from 2-7 March. Featured writers included Julia Baird, Alexis Wright, Christos Tsiolkas, Patrick deWitt, Robyn Davidson, Yanis Varoufakis, Nam Le, Bob Carr, Thomas Keneally, Trent Dalton, Richard Flanagan, Evelyn Araluen, Ali Cobby Eckermann, Ellen van Neerven, and many others.

=== 2020 ===
The 2020 event took place from 29 February to 5 March. It featured Chigozie Obioma, Sanam Maher, Tara June Winch, Christos Tsiolkas, John Boyne, Blanche d'Alpuget, Archie Roach, Jokha Alharthi, Anna Goldsworthy, Charlotte Wood, John Marsden, Megan Davis, Thomas Mayor, Ali Cobby Eckermann, Tim Costello, Tim Flannery, and many others.

=== 2019 ===
The event took place from 2–7 March. Australian authors included Trent Dalton (winner of the MUD Literary Prize), Natasha Stott Despoja, Chloe Hooper, David Stratton, Melissa Lucashenko, Ben Quilty, Eddie Woo, David Marr, David Malouf, Ceridwen Dovey, Sue Blacklock, Lyndall Ryan and Jane Harper. International authors included Ben Okri, Kassem Eid, Oyinkan Braithwaite, Carl Zimmer, Mohammed Hanif, Nazanin Sahamizadeh, Ndaba Mandela and Marlene van Niekerk. J. M. Coetzee chaired the session with Van Niekerk.

=== 2018 ===
Adelaide Writers' Week in 2018 featured Mem Fox, Clive Hamilton, Barbara Kingsolver, Eva Hornung, Amal Awad and Jackie French.

=== 2016 ===
Featured international and Australian authors at the 2016 Adelaide Writers' Week included Richard Dawkins, Fiona McFarlane, Drusilla Modjeska, Simon Winchester and Charlotte Wood.

=== 2015 ===
The 2015 Adelaide Writers' Week featured international and Australian authors including James Bradley, Helen Garner, Sofie Laguna, Kate Llewellyn, Susan Mitchell and Nicholas Shakespeare.

=== 2014 ===
Adelaide Writers' Week in 2014 featured international best-sellers and emerging writers, including Alexis Wright, Andy Griffiths, Margaret Drabble, Elizabeth Gilbert, Alexander McCall Smith, and Marcus Chown.

=== 2013 ===
2013 was the first annual Adelaide Writers' Week. The most pronounced theme was that of war stories, and featured visiting artists that included Tom Holland, Kevin Powers, Tatjana Soli, and Madeleine Thien.

=== 2012 ===
Adelaide Writers' Week in 2012 took place 3–8 March, and saw a focus on younger readers, hosting the first Kid's Program, with children's laureate Boori Monty Pryor. The festival was dedicated to Margo Lanagan. An expanded non-fiction program was included, and writers included Javier Cercas, Kate Grenville, Les Murray, and Alan Hollinghurst.

=== 2010 ===
Adelaide Writers' Week in 2010 took place from 28 February to 5 March, and featured a collection of established overseas and Australian writers, including Richard Dawkins, Audrey Niffengger, William Dalrymple, and Robert Dessaix.

=== 2008 ===
2008's Writers' Week was held between 2 March and 7 March 2008 and was dedicated to Colin Thiele. It featured a number of prize-winning authors, including Ian McEwan, Peter Carey, Paul Auster, Geraldine Brooks, and Tim Parks. Other notable authors included Germaine Greer, British historian Richard Holmes, Sri Lanka native Roma Tearne, and author Siri Hustvedt. Australian authors included poet and novelist David Malouf, Robyn Davidson, Kate Llewellyn, Melina Marchetta, and actor and novelist William McInnes.

=== 2006 ===
2006's Writers' Week focused on Dutch and Indian writing and was held between 5 March and 10 March 2006. Notable visiting authors included Pulitzer Prize winning author Michael Cunningham, crime novelists Val McDermid, Andrew Taylor and Minette Walters and Indian author Vikram Seth. Australian authors included historian professor Geoffrey Blainey and Adelaidean Peter Goldsworthy.

=== 2005 ===
In 2005, visiting authors included Isabel Allende, Margaret Atwood, Ruth Rendell and Neal Stephenson.

=== 2004 ===
Authors included Ruth Rendell, Janette Turner Hospital, Clive James, Don Watson, Anne Enright, John Marsden and J. M. Coetzee.

=== 1996 ===
Writers' Week took place 3–8 March. Visiting authors included E. Annie Proulx, J. M. Coetzee, James Ellroy and Adrian Edmondson. Australian authors included Rodney Hall, Tim Flannery, Glenda Adams, Lily Brett, Kate Grenville, Marion Halligan, Gail Jones, singer Paul Kelly, and Tim Winton.

=== 1982 ===
Writers' Week took place 7–13 March. Featured writers included Neil Armfield, Thea Astley, Blanche d'Alpuget, Helen Garner, Peter Goldsworthy, David Hare, Jeri Kroll, Thomas Shapcott, Colin Thiele, Judith Wright and Fay Weldon.

== See also ==
- Bendigo Writers Festival boycott (2025)
- South Australian Living Artists Festival
- South Australian Literary Awards
