= Writers SA =

Writers' organisation in Adelaide, South Australia

- Writers SA
- Formation: 1985; 41 years ago
- Founders: Andrew Taylor, and others
- Type: Nonprofit
- Legal status: Charity
- Headquarters: State Library of South Australia (Institute Building)
- Location: Adelaide, Australia
- Region served: South Australia
- Products: Writers' resources
- Services: Information, advice
- Methods: Workshops, professional referral service
- Fields: Creative and other writing
- Director: Jessica Alice
- Chair: Amanda Grocock
- Deputy Chair: Jane Howard
- Publication: Southern Write
- Website: writerssa.org.au
- Formerly called: South Australian Writers' Centre

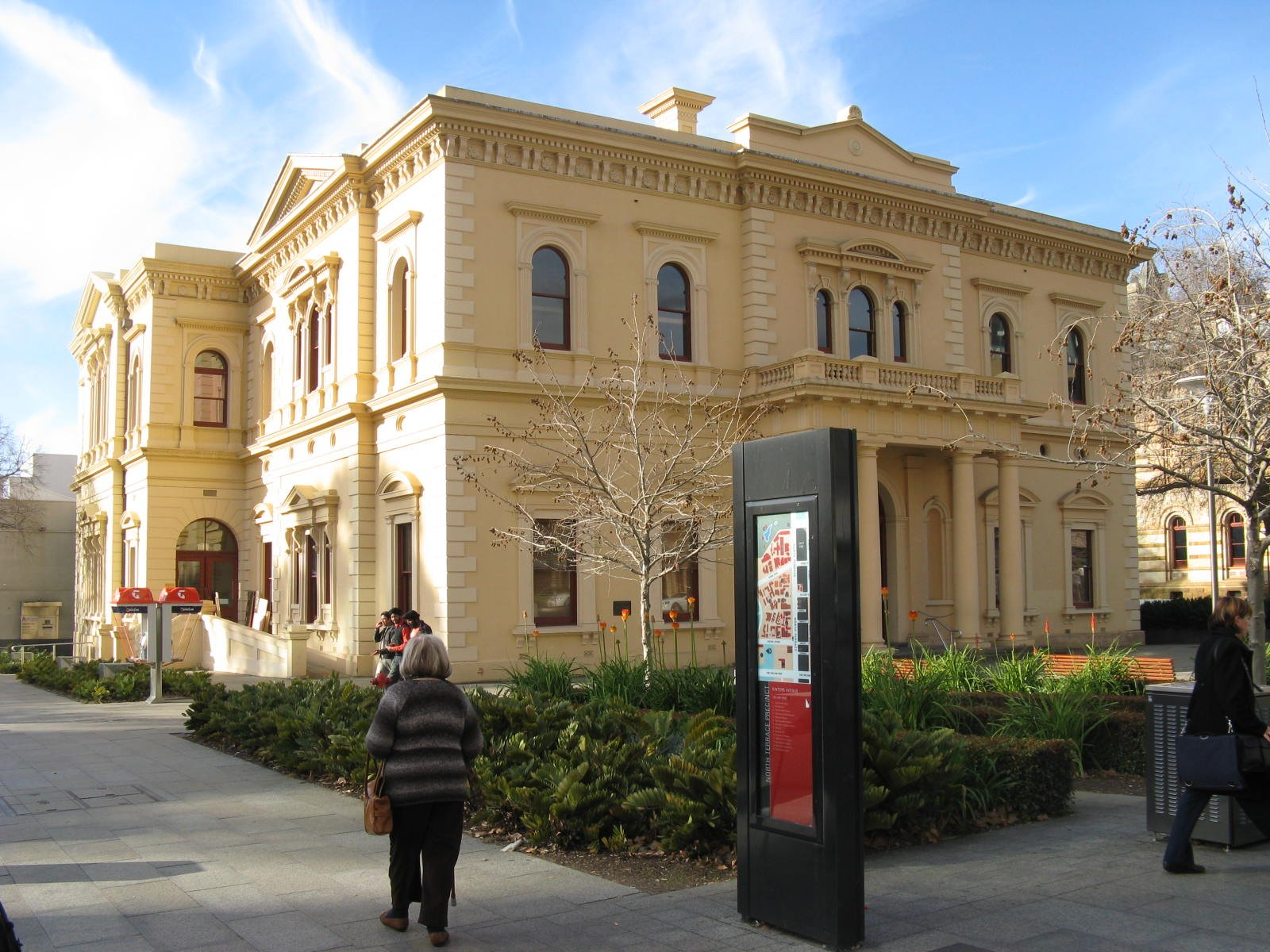
SLSA Institute building

Writers SA, registered as SA Writers' Centre Inc. and formerly known as the South Australian Writers' Centre (SAWC) and also known as the SA Writers Centre, is a resource centre for writers located in Adelaide, South Australia. Established in 1985, it was the first such centre in Australia. Its newsletter for members, produced from 1997 to 2014, was called Southern Write.

== History ==
The centre was established in 1985, the first and prototype of many subsequent writers' centres throughout Australia. One of its co-founders, and its first chair, was Andrew Taylor. It was situated at 187 Rundle Street.

From 1 December 2017 the Centre changed its name to Writers SA. With the rebranding came a move to the State Library of South Australia’s Institute Building, and plans to extend its reach, which would include "more free events, more writing workshops and three targeted year-long programs for writers at all stages of their careers".

== Description ==
The not-for-profit organisation exists to encourage and support writers of all ages and experience. It works with a range of other organisations to promote and encourage writers and literature in society. Members of the public can participate in many of their workshops, but membership of Writers SA gives access to additional services and discounts, including advice, information and support; opportunities for writing as a career, such as a professional referral service and a means for publication and promotion; access to other professionals of all kinds in the industry.

The organisation is a registered charitable organisation. It is funded by the Australian Government through the Australia Council, the Government of South Australia through Arts SA, both governments and other sponsors via Country Arts SA, corporate sponsors through advertising, and members' subscriptions and donations.

== People ==
In February 2024 Laura Kroetsch, who directed Adelaide Writers' Week from 2011 to 2018, was appointed CEO by the chair, Tanya Wilkins.

== Events and programmes ==
The South Australian Writers' Centre co-hosted the biennial South Australian Writers' Festival (2001–2011), renamed the South Australian Readers' and Writers' Festival (2013–2015) with the City of Onkaparinga.

The City of Salisbury, the SA Writers' Centre and the Salisbury Library Service have co-hosted the Salisbury Writers' Festival since 2005.

From May 2014 until December 2016, Writers SA ran a blog curated by an Australian writer, rotating every few months, known as the Writer in Residence.

In 2018, the Writers and Readers in Residence Project was launched "in which South Australian and international writers undertake an artistic residency in regional communities to activate reading as well as writing in the town". With funding assistance from the Australian Government through the Australia Council for the Arts, the programme was intended to take place from 2018 to 2020. Participating writers included Bernice Chauly, Jane Howard, Karen Wyld, and Manal Younus in 2018, and Alexis West, Whiti Hereaka, Royce Kurmelovs, and Jennifer Mills in 2019.

== Publications ==
- Southern Write, formerly S.A.W.C.: Newsletter of the South Australian Writers' Centre, or Writers' Centre Newsletter (February 1997-September 1997), was produced monthly from December 2003 until February 2012 and then quarterly until June 2014.

== See also ==
- Friendly Street Poets
