= State Library Victoria Teen Writing Bootcamp controversy =

2024 Australian political controversy

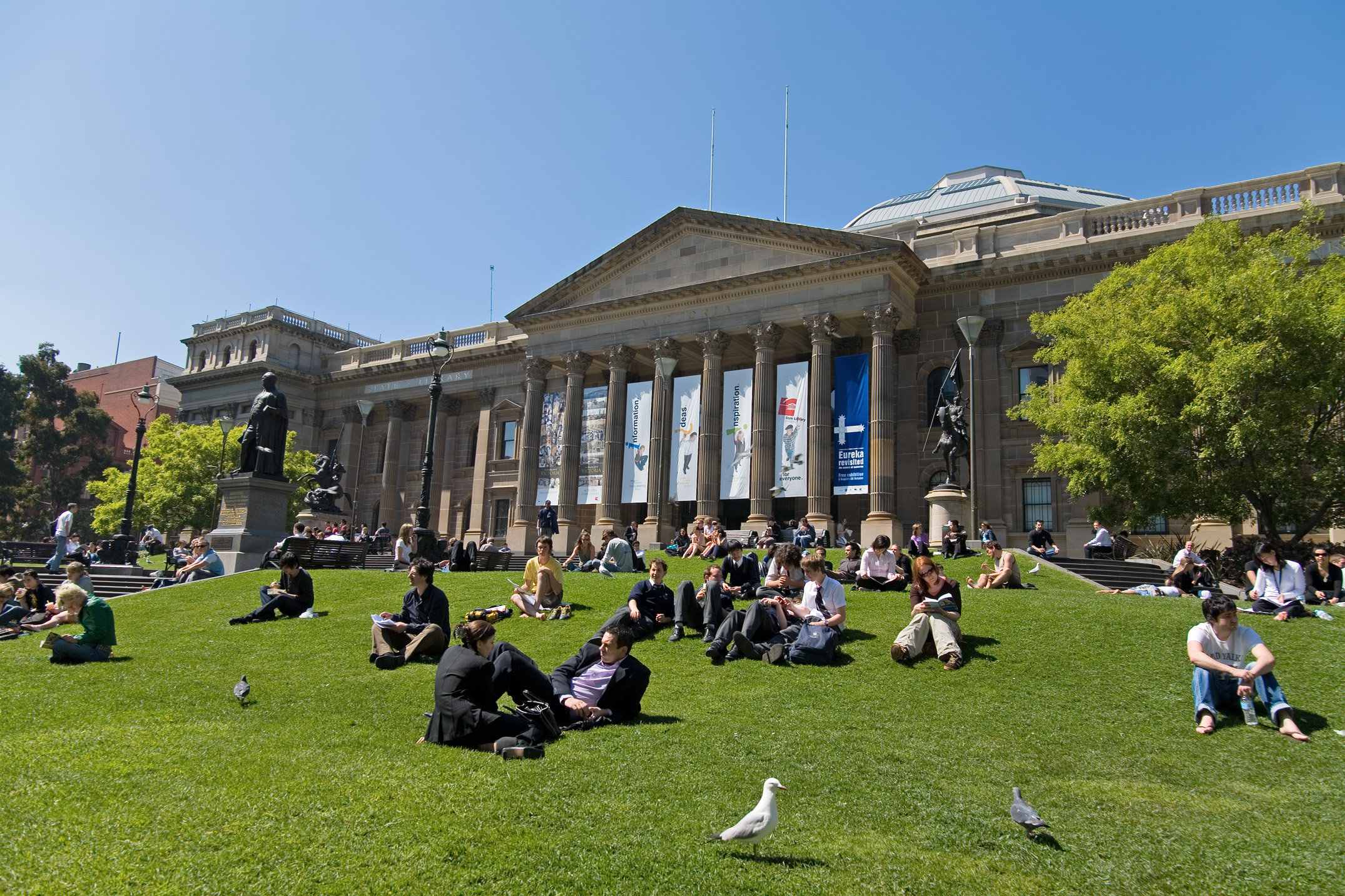
The State Library Victoria, pictured in 2005.

Six writers—Alison Evans, Amie Kaufman, Jinghua Qian, Ariel Slamet Ries, Morgan Rose and Omar Sakr—were scheduled to appear at a series of online Teen Writing Bootcamp events for young people run by the State Library Victoria in March 2024. On 28 February 2024, the entire program was cancelled and indefinitely postponed by the library who cited that a "child and cultural safety" review was necessary at a time of "heightened sensitivities".

Public speculation in the Australian media followed that the actual reason was four of the authors' public support of Palestine in the context of the Gaza war, and that the cancellation was an attempt at censorship. Accounts of numerous Library staff and internal Library emails obtained under the Freedom of Information Act have since confirmed that the writers' political views and religious backgrounds were scrutinised at length by Library staff in the leadup to the cancellation.

== Background ==
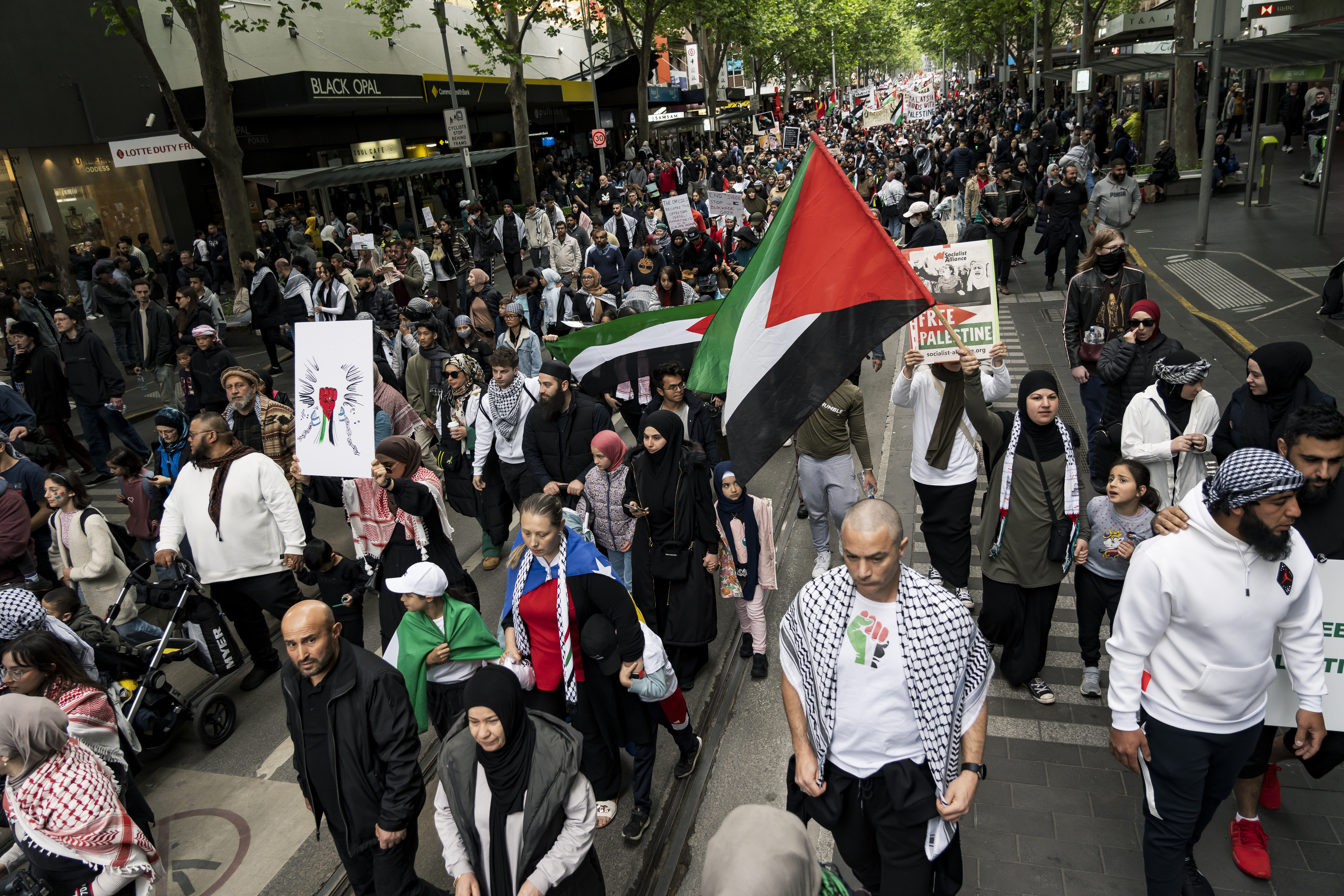
Protest opposing the Israeli offensive in the Gaza Strip.

On 15 September 2023, an official Library press release for International Democracy Day affirmed the institution's commitment to "taking a stand against increasing challenges to intellectual freedom faced by public libraries across Australia, in the form of demands for book challenges, book theft, intimidating protests and threats against public programs, including rainbow and drag queen story times". Then-CEO Paul Duldig was quoted as saying: "State Library Victoria, like all public libraries, collects without political, moral or religious bias. One group in the community doesn't get to decide what others can and can't access, or what is included in the State Collection... We are providing public library staff with the training, skills and information they need to deliver community programming while managing diverse perspectives."

The Gaza war began on 7 October 2023. Large protests supporting Palestine were widespread across Australia during 2023 and 2024, including a large rally that gathered outside the Library as a meeting place every Sunday.

In January 2024, it was publicly disclosed that the dismissal of pro-Palestinian journalist Antoinette Lattouf from the ABC had been coordinated by a WhatsApp chat named "Lawyers for Israel". Her dismissal was ultimately found to have been unlawful. In February 2024, the contents of another WhatsApp group supportive of Israel were publicly leaked by one of its members. Conversations in the group included numerous attempts to silence local artists who had spoken in favour of Palestine, including Clementine Ford. The resulting controversy led to the Federal Government proposing new legislation to legally define and forbid "doxxing".

Numerous Australian writers festivals were also the subject of controversy relating to various writers and academics and their support of either Israel or Palestine in early 2024.

== Cancellation of the workshops ==
The Teen Writing Bootcamps were originally scheduled to take place online in March 2024, with each of the authors given a specialised area of education such as poetry and young adult fiction. On 28 February 2024, the entire series of workshops was cancelled in an email that claimed a "child and cultural safety review" was necessary:

We have a duty of care to ensure the highest levels of child and cultural safety are in place for all participants, artists and facilitators in our programs, and we take this very seriously. At a time of heightened sensitivities, we believe it is important to conduct this review carefully and thoroughly and take the time needed to make sure that the design and implementation guidelines for programs remain appropriate.

The library publicly continues to insist that the program was postponed and not cancelled. However, they initially sent a "termination agreement" to Sakr and the other writers involved in the program. This claimed that they were being terminated "due to circumstances which were not apparent at the time of entering into the contract" and offered immediate full payment on condition that the writers agree they must not "make any claim or demand that the library must do something, or must not do something, in connection with the contract or the program". Neither Sakr, Evans, Ries or Qian have signed this agreement.

== Responses ==
=== Response from authors ===
When the cancellation was made public, speculation followed in The Age and The Guardian that public support of Palestine by Evans, Qian, Ries and Sakr was the actual reason for the "postponement", and that the Gaza war was the "heightened sensitivities" referred to.

Evans told The Guardian:

I think it’s very easy to speculate, but I just don’t know. It’s very unclear why they’ve made this decision. I can say that I don’t think the cancellations are due to child safety issues. It’s a program that’s been running at least three years.

Sakr told The Age:

Who was unsafe? What does it mean? You have to clearly articulate if you decided on your own that your processes are insufficient, that you are unsafe. You can say that out loud. But I won’t allow the inference to remain that we are unsafe... I’m more than willing to have a conversation around the safety of children with anyone. I would love, in fact, to see the safety of Palestinian children foregrounded in this country given our government’s role in what’s happening in Palestine and that they have cut funding to the principal aid organisation on the ground there as we are seeing Palestinian children starve to death.

In an interview with Jacobin, Qian stated:

(The cancellation) struck me as very odd, given that the library has been running this program since 2021 and there were already robust child safety protocols in place. My understanding now is that the library cancelled the program as an act of self-censorship, to preempt the backlash they expected for giving a platform to pro-Palestine writers. I only know this because of whistleblowers; the library continues to deny it. To this day management hasn’t said what prompted its decision... I think there has been a deliberate campaign to frame all criticism of Israel as antisemitic, to justify all Israeli aggression as self-defense, and to paint all scrutiny of Israel’s actions as aggression. It inverts and exploits the language of anti-racism to censor, silence, intimidate, and punish.

=== Official responses from the Library ===
Library president Christine Christian told The Australian that "the deferment was made to ensure the safety of its program participants (as) the unique community service carried with it a duty to provide a safe environment". Another SLV spokesperson told The Guardian that the workshop had been deferred "due to changes in the external environment (to ensure) the highest levels of child and cultural safety are in place", but would not give further details. Later, the Library further clarified that this had occurred solely "to protect children attending without a parent" and that they "don't comment on the interpretation of an individual's views or backgrounds. Their personal views are their own and the Library is apolitical."

=== Claims by Library staff ===
On 14 March 2024, The Age published claims attributed to anonymous Library employees that Duldig told a meeting attended by 30 staff that the writers' public support of Palestine was the actual reason for the "postponement". He was quoted as having said:

You call it profiling. I call it risk management.

113 of the library's 300 staff signed an internal letter in support of Sakr and the other writers that accused the library of "censorship and discrimination". It was also revealed that the library's former head of engagement, Angharad Wynne-Jones, had resigned in the aftermath of the scandal.

On 12 July 2024, The Age reported that the Library had begun forbidding its staff from wearing any items that "support or promote a particular political viewpoint”, including the watermelon symbol, the Palestinian flag and the Australian Aboriginal flag. In a statement, the library claimed that staff members are "encouraged to wear badges or pins on their lanyards that support diversity and inclusion, including badges with the Aboriginal flag” but did not explain why pro-Palestinian symbols were considered inappropriate.

=== Motion raised in Victorian Parliament ===
On 20 March 2024, Gabrielle de Vietri of the Victorian Greens introduced a motion in Victorian Parliament that acknowledged the Library had "terminated the contracts of four writers who have spoken in support of Palestine", and that as political censorship is "indefensible" and public institutions are expected to hold "high ethical and transparency standards", the Library should now fully account for its decision. The motion was not passed.

=== Boycott of the Library by other authors ===
On 29 April 2024, The Age reported that numerous well-known Australian authors, including Tony Birch, Michelle de Kretser and Grace Yee, were boycotting the Library indefinitely until the matter is resolved.

== Internal emails ==
=== Content of the emails ===
On 16 and 17 July 2024, The Age and The Guardian published numerous internal emails from the Library relating to the incident that had been obtained under the Freedom of Information Act. These emails, while heavily redacted, confirmed that the Library had indeed scrutinised the political and religious views of the authors on various topics and especially Palestine when making the decision to cancel the workshops. In one email, former Labor MP and then-Library board member Maxine McKew discussed a Substack article by Sakr about Palestine at length, adding:

Do we have a clear read on everything Omar Sakr has posted since then? If not, we should know and soon... It doesn’t mean we vet everyone for their social and political views, but it does mean on a subject such as Gaza/Israel we have a duty to be absolutely thorough and super careful about the way language is used by the people we engage. We need to be alert to what’s said and what’s not said.

This was followed by a request to do "a quick scan" of the social media of the other authors. A list was then prepared of posts they had made on various issues, including Qian's support of Lattouf and Yang Hengjun, Evans' posts about the war in Sudan and "First Nations solidarity around Change the Date", as well as "pro-Palestinian content" posted by Evans, Qian, Ries and Sakr. Creative Victoria were also consulted for advice.

Another email from an unnamed staff member raised concerns that a Muslim should not be paired with a Jew without "risk management":

I wanted to flag with you two authors who are paired together for one of the teen writing boot camp information sessions on 15 Feb. The reason I’m flagging it is because one is of Muslim heritage (Omar Sakr) and the other I believe is of Jewish heritage and it’s just clicked that this might need some additional risk management.

=== Official response from the Library ===
McKew told The Guardian that her decisions were informed by "the policy of political neutrality which covers all the major Victorian cultural institutions" that the library had been "entirely consistent" in applying. Duldig continued to insist that the Bootcamp sessions had not been "postponed" because of the political views of the authors: "Concerns were raised with the library about the blogs of one writer, Mr Sakr, and these blogs were found not to require further action. In reviewing those concerns, the library did however find that its policies and procedures were not sufficiently robust, and therefore decided to undertake a program-wide duty of care review." Another Library spokesperson stated that the emails affirm their position that a duty of care review was underway, and that "(upholding) the core value of respectful conduct... has come into sharp focus in the current geopolitical environment".

=== Response from authors ===
Sakr stated that the emails proved that the Library's "invocation of child safety as the reason for cancelling the program was disingenuous". Evans called them "shameful", adding that the way the Library had "continued to assert that our views had nothing to do with the cancellations (was) appalling". Qian called them proof of "a blatant act of censorship".

== Duty of care review ==
=== Consultation and the VPS Code of Conduct ===
In July, the Library consulted with various authors as part of their promised "duty of care review". One of those authors, Jess Walton, documented the experience in detail in a thread on X (Twitter). She reported that the Library repeatedly expressed an intention to request artists to sign the Victorian Public Servants Code of Conduct in future, which, Walton observed, would make it legally enforceable to fire them based on political commentary they have made on social media. Walton reported that the Library's Kath Green did not address these concerns directly, but reasserted that the review was based on "duty of care for everyone involved... the children who are the participants in the program, but also presenters, facilitators, the staff supporting those facilitators - we should have been better. We should have been on top of that."

=== Contents of the review ===
The Duty of Care Review, led by Helen Conway and Tony Grybowski and Associates, was released by the Library and published on their website on 7 August 2024. The report makes the following recommendations:

1. Finalise the Freedom of Expression and Respectful Conduct schedule as a legally enforceable requirement for inclusion in external contractor agreements.
2. Obtain (legal and/or governing state department) advice to clarify the status of contractors in relation to compliance with the Victorian Public Service Code of Conduct.
3. Ensure all relevant Library policies include specific reference to the wording of the Victorian Public Service Code of Conduct Making Public Comment policy.
4. Develop an Introduction resource guide to support staff understanding of the key requirements as public servants and working at the Library, the range of obligations of Duty of Care and with links to relevant detailed policies.
5. Undertake a review of policies with the objective to consolidate under content groupings, ensure consistency and reduce duplication, and in turn enhance their accessibility.
6. Collate and refine definitions into a glossary to enhance common understanding of Library policies and procedure.
7. Create policy management guidelines and provided to all responsible officers.
8. Develop a welcome and induction guide for contractors that outlines the expectations and requirements of working with and for the Library.
9. Make a curatorial statement available for external stakeholders to support engagement negotiations.
10. Review guidelines for parental consent and participant guidelines and ensure systems are able to facilitate obligations.

The Library have committed to "adopting all ten recommendations", adding that they are "committed to providing a welcoming, inclusive, and respectful place for cultural expression and engagement".

=== Subsequent Duldig ABC interview and retirement ===
On 20 August 2024, Duldig spoke about the matter to ABC Radio Melbourne's Raf Epstein. Duldig again insisted that the workshops were not cancelled, but rather postponed, and that the issue had been related to "duty of care" and the need to create "a safe and respectful place for everyone". He also added that the Library "had done the work as an institution to be resilient around the drag queen story time but (wasn't) ready to face the challenges of dealing with hate speech and other things that related to Gaza". Duldig denied that pressure from Library donors motivated the decision.

On 21 July 2025, the Library announced that Duldig would retire "at the conclusion of his current contract, to focus on family responsibilities interstate".

=== Subsequent Christine Christian interview ===
On 7 June 2025, Library board member Christine Christian discussed the matter in the Australian Financial Review. The Review's article reported - in the body of the article itself, without quoting Christian directly - that the Library made the decision because the authors were critical of Israel:

Last year, (the Library) took a controversial and much-scrutinised decision to postpone a series of teen writing workshops. It did this because several of the authors contracted to lead the workshops had posted dozens of times decrying Israel’s incursion into Gaza and its effects on the enclave’s civilians, to varying degrees of vehemence. In response, the library’s board decided to delay the workshops until it reviewed its contracts and procedures.

The article also quotes Christian as saying the decision was made because of "the possibility of unaccompanied minors being exposed to what could be considered hate speech... This was about minors and our duty of care – some participants [in the boot camp] were as young as seven."

== See also ==
- Adelaide Writers' Week boycott
- Bendigo Writers Festival boycott
