= Annika Smethurst =

Australian journalist

- Education: Monash University
- Occupation: Journalist
- Website: Annika Smethurst on X

Annika Smethurst is an Australian journalist. She is the state political editor for The Age newspaper in Melbourne.

== Early life and education ==
Smethurst graduated from Girton Grammar School in Bendigo, Victoria in 2005. She studied journalism and international studies at Monash University, beginning her degree in 2007 and completing her honours thesis in journalism in 2010. She spent a semester of her degree at Bishop's University in Quebec, Canada.

== Career ==
After graduating in 2010, Smethurst began a traineeship with News Corp Australia.

In 2012, while a reporter at the Bendigo Weekly, Smethurst played an important role covering the Jill Meagher missing person case and homicide investigation. Smethurst lived close to Meagher's house at the time and said that covering the story was difficult for her.

In June 2012, Smethurst joined the Herald Sun reporting team. In 2013, Smethurst and her colleagues, James Campbell, Matt Johnston, Michelle Ainsworth and Mitchell Toy, were nominated for a Walkley Award for their investigation into the back-room dealings of the office of the then Victorian premier Ted Baillieu, which exposed secret conversations between the premier's chief of staff and Tristan Weston, an adviser to the deputy premier Peter Ryan.

Smethurst joined the Herald Sun's Canberra team in 2015. In December 2015, she won the 2015 Walkley Award for All Media Scoop of the Year for her investigation of the "Choppergate" expenses scandal involving Bronwyn Bishop's inappropriate use of parliamentary travel entitlements. She also won two Melbourne Press Club Quill Awards for her work on Choppergate.

In 2017, Smethurst won her second Walkley Award, also in the Scoop of the Year category, for her story about taxpayer-funded trips to the Gold Coast made by Sussan Ley MP, to buy a flat. Ley was forced to resign as Health Minister as a result of the scandal.

In 2020, her book, On Secrets, was published by Hachette.

=== Espionage exclusive and AFP raid ===
On 4 June 2019, the Australian Federal Police raided Smethurst's home over a story she published in 2018. She had been reporting on "alleged plans to allow greater surveillance of Australian citizens", with agents searching her computer, phone, and home. At the time of the raid, she was the political editor of Sydney's The Sunday Telegraph. In her original report in April 2018, she "revealed top secret emails between Department of Home Affairs Secretary Mike Pezzullo and Department of Defence Secretary Greg Moriarty, discussing a plan to allow the cyber spy agency to snoop on Australian citizens". A "tepid" response to the raid, which included going through her cookbooks and underwear, from the prime minister resulted in criticism from the press and organisations such as the Australian Lawyers Alliance. News Corp called it a "dangerous act of intimidation". The AFP confirmed the raid was not only to uncover her source, but to potentially look into Smethurst and News Corp as targets for a criminal charge.

On 15 April 2020, the High Court of Australia ruled that the search warrant used in the raid was invalid.

On 27 May 2020 the AFP announced that Smethurst would not be charged over her stories that "...relied on classified intelligence documents".
