= Rosemary Sorensen =

Rosemary Sorensen (born 1954) is an Australian journalist, editor, and literary critic previously working for The Australian, then for the Bendigo Weekly. She founded the Bendigo Writers Festival which she directed for 11 years.

Sorensen graduated from Monash University with a PhD. Her thesis was titled "Tristan Corbiere: poetic posture and imposture".

Sorensen was formerly editor of the Australian Book Review, 1989 to 1994, and the books and arts editor for the Brisbane Courier-Mail.

In 2012, together with staff of the City of Greater Bendigo, she assisted in the creation of the Bendigo Writers Festival and served as its festival director from 2012 to 2023.
