= Book Industry Strategy Group =

Former Australian government program to examine impacts on the book market

The Australian Book Industry Strategy Group (BISG) was an initiative of the Australian government to examine the impact of the digital age on the country's book publishing industry.

== Background ==
Then Minister for Innovation, Industry, Science and Research, Senator Kim Carr, established the Australian Book Industry Strategy Group in 2010. The group conducted market analysis research, took public submissions and held Stakeholder Workshops in which over 200 industry representatives participated. The BISG delivered its final report to Carr in September 2011. Following a launch at Parliament House, Canberra, the report was released to the public on 9 November 2011. It contains both recommendations to the Australian government and proposed actions for the publishing industry.

== Membership of the BISG ==
The BISG was chaired by writer, lawyer, and former politician Barry Jones. The group's members were:

- Louise Adler, chief executive officer, Melbourne University Publishing
- Philip Andersen, chief executive officer, Printing Industries Association of Australia
- David Barnett, chief executive officer, Australia/NZ, Pearson Education Australia
- Lorraine Cassin, Printing Division secretary, Australian Manufacturing Workers Union
- Graeme Connelly, chief executive officer, Melbourne University Bookshop / Chair, Australian Campus Booksellers Association
- Tom Crago, chief executive officer, Tantalus Media
- Alan Fahy, chief executive officer, McPherson's Printing Group
- David Fenlon, group managing director, REDgroup Retail
- David Gaunt, co-owner, Gleebooks
- Ross Gibb, managing director, Macmillan Australia Group
- Alexander Grant, independent chair and director, Copyright Agency Limited
- Angelo Loukakis, executive director, Australian Society of Authors
- Emmett Stinson, president, Small Press Underground Network Community
- Christopher Warren, federal secretary, Media, Entertainment and Arts Alliance
