= Susan Mitchell (Australian author) =

Australian author and oral historian

- Born: 1945 (age 80–81); Adelaide, Australia
- Website: www.saxton.com.au/susan-mitchell/

Susan Mitchell (born 1945) is a writer, newspaper columnist, and public speaker.

Mitchell has authored 15 books, including Tall Poppies (1984). She hosted a morning talk show in Adelaide and Brisbane on ABC radio, and a television interview program entitled Susan Mitchell: In Conversation which aired twice weekly on ABC. Most of her books have focused on the lives of women in politics, business, sports, literature and public life, including the biography, Margaret and Gough: The Love Story That Shaped a Nation (2014), which chronicled the life of the former prime minister Gough Whitlam and the love he shared with his wife and partner Margaret. Mitchell also wrote opinion pieces about political and social issues for The Australian, as well as feature articles for various media in Australia and the U.S. She is an adjunct professor emeritus at Flinders University.

== Career ==
For her first book, Tall Poppies, published in 1984 Mitchell interviewed nine successful Australian women – Beatrice Faust, Elizabeth Riddell, Eve Mahlab, Mima Stojanovic, Robyn Nevin, Joy Baluch, Maggie Tabberer, Pat Lovell and Pat O'Shane.

Her 1997 book Icons, Saints and Divas: Intimate conversations with women who changed the world includes Gloria Steinem, Betty Friedan, Erica Jong and Germaine Greer.

Mitchell is a past Director of the Adelaide Writers’ Week and regular participant as both author and facilitator/interviewer.

Mitchell was appointed a Director of the South Australian Film Corporation in May 2013; and Director of TAFE SA, in 2015 Previously she was a director of the Literature Board of The Australia Council (1992–95), Film Australia (1995–98) and the South Australian Tourism Commission.

In April 2017 Mitchell was named the Ambassador for Mature Women for a joint South Australian government, Office for the Ageing and COTA SA project. She has been conducting interviews with women over 50 about their experiences of working and unemployment. A summary of her findings was released in November 2017, titled Mature Women Can!

== Published works ==
- Tall Poppies: Nine Successful Australian Women Talk to Susan Mitchell, (Penguin, 1984)
- Winning Women: Challenging the norms in Australian sport, with Ken Dyer (Penguin, 1985)
- The Matriarchs: Twelve Australian women talk about their lives to Susan Mitchell (Penguin, 1987)
- Hot Shots (Penguin, 1990)
- Tall Poppies Too: Eight successful Australian women talk candidly about their lives (Penguin, 1991)
- Public Lives, Private Passions: Nine women talk about their lives and partnerships with influential men (Simon & Schuster, 1994)
- The Scent of Power: Women in Australian politics (Angus & Robertson, 1996)
- Icons, Saints and Divas: Intimate conversations with women who changed the world (HarperCollins, 1997)
- Splitting the World Open: Taller Poppies and Me (Allen & Unwin, 2001)
- Be Bold! And discover the power of praise (Simon & Schuster, 2001, 2004)
- Kerryn & Jackie: The shared life of Kerryn Phelps and Jackie Stricker (Allen & Unwin, 2002)
- All Things Bright & Beautiful: Murder in the city of light (Pan Macmillan Australia, 2004)
- Margaret Whitlam: A biography (Random House Australia, 2006
- Stand by your Man: Sonia, Tamie & Janette (Random House Australia, 2007)
- Tony Abbott: A Man’s Man (Scribe Publications, 2011)
- Margaret & Gough (Hachette Australia, 2014)

== Archive ==
Two collections of Mitchell's oral history interviews have been acquired by the National Library of Australia. The first collection (acquired 1989) includes 41 cassettes of interviews conducted with prominent Australian women as research for her first three books (1981–87). A further collection of 85 cassettes recorded with Australian women and international feminists was acquired in 2005. The archive also includes manuscripts of her books, letters from readers, book reviews and other materials.
