= Jo Dyer =

Australian theatre and film producer

- Born: 1969 (age 56–57); Melbourne, Australia
- Citizenship: Australian (since birth); British (until 19 February 2022)
- Education: Presbyterian Girls' College; University of Adelaide
- Known for: Adelaide Writers' Week
- Notable work: Lucky Miles, Girl Asleep
- Political party: Independent (since 2022)
- Other political affiliations: Labor (until 2001)
- Partner: Tom Wright
- Children: One

Jo Dyer (born 1969) is an Australian theatre and film producer, and director of Adelaide Writers' Week from 2019 to 2022. She is known for the films Lucky Miles (2007) and Girl Asleep (2015).

In 2021 she was involved in a legal case relating to the rape allegations against former Attorney-general Christian Porter. A former Labor pre-selection candidate, she was unsuccessful as an independent candidate for Boothby at the 2022 federal election.

== Early life and education ==
Jo Dyer was born in Melbourne in 1969, the youngest of three daughters. Dyer's family moved to Adelaide, South Australia when she was a toddler with her parents and two older siblings. Her parents were both academics, who proudly displayed their left-wing leanings. They separated when she was a teenager. Dyer attended Presbyterian Girls' College (now Seymour College) on a scholarship, and became head of the SRC.

She then went to the University of Adelaide to study arts, at the same time as later politicians Natasha Stott Despoja, Penny Wong, Jay Weatherill, Christopher Pyne, Mark Butler and Pat Conlon, and political journalists Annabel Crabb and David Penberthy. She graduated with a law degree, although admits to not being a good student because she was having too much fun.

== Career ==
Dyer's first job was as receptionist for the State Theatre Company of South Australia, which diverted her from a career in insurance law. After a stint at the Australian Human Rights Commission, she took on the role of general manager of Bangarra Dance Theatre in 1996. Working with artistic director Stephen Page, she was credited with improving its financial standing, partly due to securing its first corporate partner.

In 1999 she returned to Adelaide, after being appointed general manager of the children’s festival Come Out (now DreamBIG), and two years later made a failed attempt to get pre-selection as a Labor candidate for the upcoming election.

Later in 2001 Dyer was appointed executive producer of Sydney Theatre Company, first under artistic director Robyn Nevin, then Cate Blanchett and Andrew Upton, remaining in this position for 11 years before becoming a freelance producer for a few years, and also in this time giving birth to her son. After this she became executive director (2015) and then CEO (2016) of Sydney Writers' Festival until 2018.

In March 2018 Dyer was appointed director of Adelaide Writers' Week, which takes place in March each year as part of the Adelaide Festival, starting with the 2019 event. After presiding over two events under challenging conditions brought about by the COVID-19 pandemic, restricting the movement of international and interstate authors, as well as some personal challenges, in August 2021 it was announced that Dyer would be stepping down after the March 2022 edition. She has been praised for lifting the profile of the event, gaining national media coverage as a result of showcasing a wide range of ideas and prominent people, who have included politicians (including Kevin Rudd and Malcolm Turnbull, who feature in the 2022 event.

Dyer has also been a member of the external advisory panel to the Assemblage Centre for Creative Arts at Flinders University, headed by Garry Stewart, along with Greg Mackie, Wesley Enoch, Rebecca Summerton, and others.

=== Films and accolades ===
Dyer is known for the films Lucky Miles (2007) and Girl Asleep (2015). Her films have been nominated twice for Best Film at the AACTA Awards, and she was given the Best Producer Award at the 2007 Asian First Film Awards at the 3rd Asian Festival of First Films in Singapore.

=== Companies ===
She established Soft Tread Enterprises in 2008, which produces independent projects in the performing arts. She also co-founded Rose Tinted Enterprises with magician James Galea, which produces magic and comedy shows on a variety of platforms.

== Christian Porter court case ==
In 2021, while she was running Writers' Week, Dyer became involved in a legal case relating to the rape allegations against Christian Porter. Dyer had been a friend of "Kate", the alleged victim, in the 1980s when she was told about the alleged rape by Christian Porter. The alleged victim committed suicide in 2020 by which time Porter had become the Attorney-General of Australia.

The ABC recorded an interview with Dyer, aired over two episodes of Four Corners and included in an article by reporter Louise Milligan, in which she said that she had believed her friend (known as "Kate" in media reporting of the case) because of the level of detail she described. The case against Porter was closed in March 2021 due to "insufficient admissible evidence". After Porter brought a defamation case against the ABC, Dyer brought litigation to prevent one of Porter's lawyers, Sue Chrysanthou, from representing him, believing that she had conflicting interests in the case, as she (Chrysanthou) had previously had access to confidential information about the victim and Porter involving Dyer relating to a separate incident. Porter joined the case as an active participant, and it became evident that the costs of the case would be significant to whoever lost.

Dyer was awarded A$550,000 in costs from Porter in June 2021, and in January 2022, Porter and Chrysanthou were ordered to pay costs of A$430,200 for the case brought by Dyer, although Porter was appealing the decision. In June 2023, the NSW Bar Council reprimanded Chrysanthou for acting for Porter, after Dyer had made a separate complaint to them about the matter.

== Politics ==
Dyer attempted to gain pre-selection for the 2001 federal election as a Labor candidate, but was unsuccessful due to factional manoeuvring.

She is the author of a book, Burning Down the House: Reconstructing Australian Politics, published by Monash University Press in February 2022, which is critical of both the Coalition and Labor and examines the reasons behind the new Community Independents movement.

Dyer was endorsed by Voices of Boothby to run as an independent candidate for Boothby at the 2022 federal election. Boothby is the second most marginal seat in the country, in which the Nick Xenophon Team gained 20% of the vote in 2016 against the incumbent, Nicolle Flint (Liberal). The Liberal Party was reported to be concerned about Independents such as Dyer, whose preferences may flow to Labor and cause them to lose the seat. Dyer states on her website that she will not be directing voters' preferences, only asking for their first (or second) preference votes for her.

Dyer ran Writers' Week at the same time as campaigning for the election until Writers' Week ended on 10 March. Her politics are based on personal conviction and her bid to run as an independent is an attempt to prosecute her convictions without getting "crushed" by factional politics.

Candidates for the Australian parliament must not be citizens of any other country. Dyer held British citizenship through her parents' birthplaces, so she applied to renounce her British citizenship in December 2021. She had not received confirmation that the process had been completed when nominations closed. A 2018 case involving Katy Gallagher determined that merely submitting the form was insufficient. She received confirmation late on 29 April that her UK citizenship had been revoked on 19 February. Hence, she was eligible to have nominated and to sit in parliament should she be elected. She stated that if elected she would seek amendment of Section 44 of the Constitution of Australia as she said that requiring candidates to renounce secondary citizenship is an inhibitor to attracting the widest range of people from diverse backgrounds.

Dyer received 6.54 percent of primary votes cast in Boothby, and was not elected.

== Personal life ==
Dyer has a son, Ezekiel, who went to school in Adelaide when she became director of AWW. Her partner Tom Wright is a notable Australian playwright.

The older of her two sisters, Lesley Dyer, is a film producer in Los Angeles.
