= Bendigo Weekly =

The Bendigo Weekly was a tabloid-size, full-colour newspaper published weekly throughout Bendigo, and country districts in central Victoria, including Woodend, Echuca, Wedderburn and Colbinabbin until 2019.

The paper has won many awards, including a Walkley Award by journalist Anthony Radford for Suburban and Regional Affairs. Radford also was the recipient of a Quill Award for Best Regional or Rural Affairs Report in 2007.

Victorian Country Press Awards for a paper with circulation greater than 10,000 include: Journalism 2006, 2007 and 2008; Local Reporting 2006, 2007 and 2008; Best Use of Colour 2007; Best Photographic Study 2008; Best News Photograph 2008; and Overall Newspaper Excellence 2008.

The awards won in 2006 relate specifically to the paper's coverage of the water crisis confronting Bendigo. At the time, a decade of drought had depleted the city's reservoirs to the point where supplies were likely to run out by year's end.

In 2009 the paper commenced a campaign to promote the building of a new Bendigo hospital.

In September 2019, it was announced the paper would cease publication as a separate entity and was absorbed by the Bendigo Advertiser, which aims to boost poor circulation figures of the latter masthead.
