= Susan Abulhawa =

Palestinian-American writer and activist (born 1970)

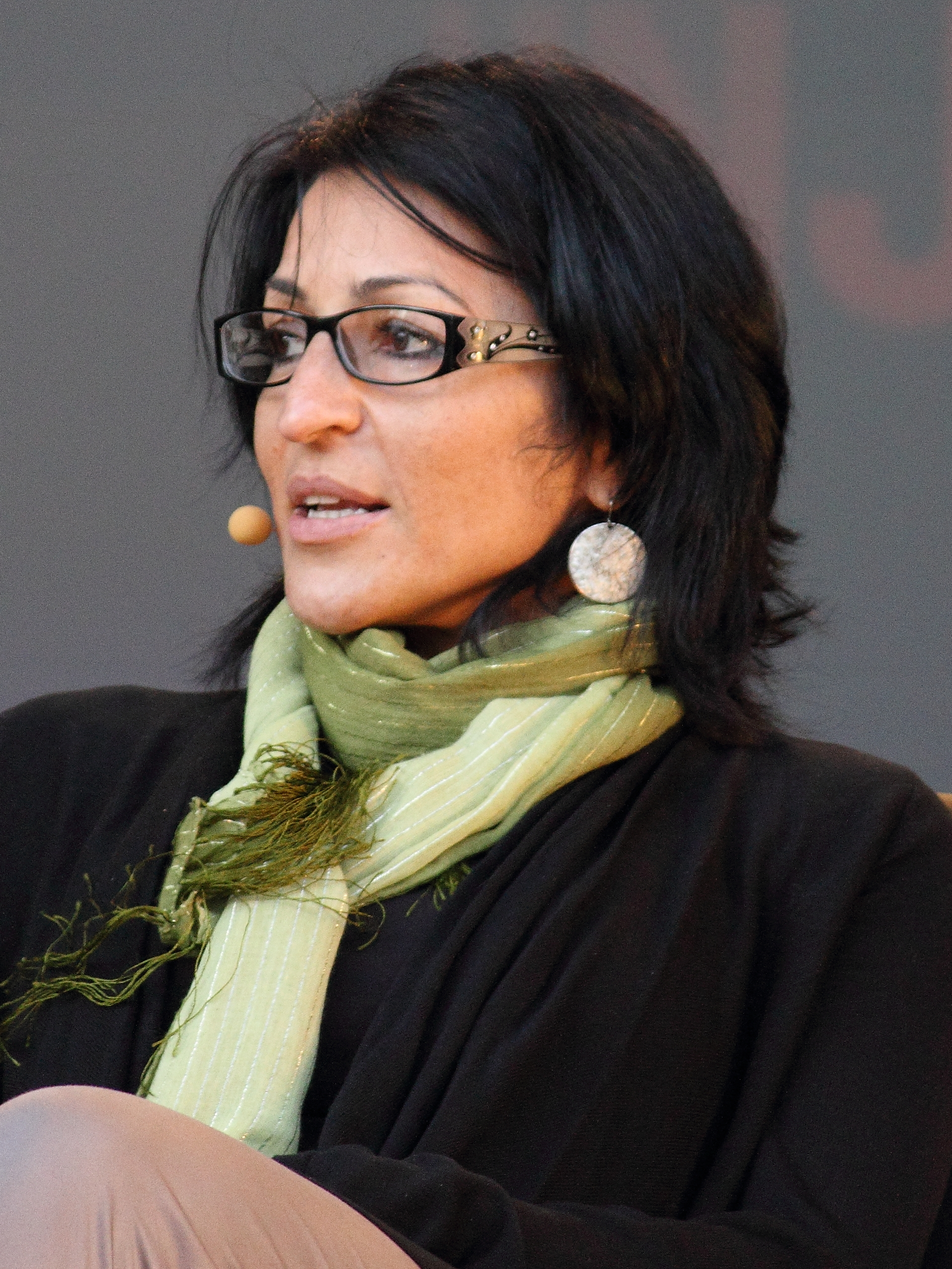
- Abulhawa in 2010
- Born: 1970 (age 55–56); Kuwait
- Occupations: Activist; writer
- Writing career
- Notable works: Mornings in Jenin; The Blue Between Sky and Water

Susan Abulhawa (Arabic: سوزان أبو الهوى; born 1970) is a Palestinian-American writer, and activist. She wrote the novels Mornings in Jenin, The Blue Between Sky and Water (2015), and Against the Loveless World (2020). She founded the children's organization Playgrounds for Palestine.

== Early life and education ==
Susan Abulhawa's parents, born in At-Tur, a neighborhood on the Mount of Olives east of the Old City of Jerusalem, were Palestinian refugees of the Six-Day War in 1967. Her father, according to one account, "was expelled at gunpoint; her mother, who was studying in Germany at the time, was unable to return and the couple reunited in Jordan before moving to Kuwait, where Abulhawa was born in 1970."

Her parents split shortly after her birth and Abulhawa's childhood was turbulent, moving between Kuwait, the United States, Jordan, and Palestine. She lived in the United States with an uncle until she was 5, then spent several years moving between relatives in Jordan and Kuwait. She lived in Dar al-Tifl al-Arabi, a Jerusalem orphanage, from the age of 10 to 13. At 13 she returned to the United States, where she lived with her father briefly before entering the foster care system.

Abulhawa studied biology at Pfeiffer University in North Carolina, and completed a masters in neuroscience (biomedical science) at the University of South Carolina School of Medicine.

After her studies, Abulhawa began a career in medical science. Prior to dedicating herself to writing full-time, she worked as a researcher for a large pharmaceutical company.

== Activism ==
In July 2001, Abulhawa founded Playgrounds for Palestine, a non-governmental organization dedicated to upholding The Right to Play for Palestinian children and build playgrounds in Palestine and UN refugee camps in Lebanon and Syria. The first playground was erected in early 2002. She is involved in the Boycott, Divestment and Sanctions (BDS) movement and as a speaker for Al Awda, a Palestinian right of return coalition. Abulhawa is signatory to the boycott campaign against Israel, including a cultural boycott. She gave the keynote address at one of the first campus BDS conferences at the University of Pennsylvania. Abulhawa has said the BDS movement was "one of the most effective ways to promote Palestinian rights and achieve justice against Israel's ongoing ethnic cleansing".

Abulhawa has compared Israel to apartheid South Africa. In 2013, Abulhawa declined an invitation from Al Jazeera Media Network to participate in a discussion about the Nakba with three or four Israelis, having been asked by the producer to participate as the only Palestinian as they needed her to "balance things out". In an explanatory letter, she criticized the premise of the discussion, comparing it to featuring descendants of Nazis on Holocaust Remembrance Day with a token Jewish participant.

In 2024, Abulhawa declared in light of the Gaza war that "Israel is committing the holocaust of our time, and it is doing it in full view of a seemingly indifferent world." On November 29, 2024, Abulhawa was invited by the Oxford Union to debate the motion "This House Believes Israel is an Apartheid State Responsible for Genocide". She spoke as a member of a team in favor of the proposition together with Miko Peled and Mohammed El-Kurd. The motion was carried with a majority of 278 to 59. The Oxford Union later deleted her original recording on YouTube and uploaded a censored version. The parts of Abulhawa's speech that were edited out by the Oxford Union included her mentions of the IDF's abuse of Palestinian and Lebanese civilians and the IDF's use of "booby trapped toys". Abulhawa responded that the Union seemed to have yielded to demands from Zionists "as Palestinians struggle to make our voices heard in the midst of a genocide". Abulhawa sued the Oxford Union and a settlement was reached under which the Oxford Union made Abulhawa's full speech available on its platforms.

== Writing ==
Abulhawa's political and romantic fiction is written in English. Her first language in which she learned to read and write was Arabic. Her writing career began with essays and political commentaries. Her work appeared in newspapers and magazines, including the New York Daily News, Chicago Tribune, The Philadelphia Inquirer, The Internationalist, The Christian Science Monitor, and more.

Abulhawa is a contributing author to two anthologies, Shattered Illusions (Amal Press, 2002) and Searching Jenin (Cune Press, 2003).

Her debut novel The Scar of David (2006), republished as Mornings in Jenin (2010), is a multigenerational family epic spanning five countries and more than sixty years, focusing on the effects on Palestinians of the Israeli occupation. It became an international bestseller translated into 32 languages.

In 2013 Abulhawa published a collection of poetry entitled My Voice Sought the Wind.

Her second novel, The Blue Between Sky and Water (2015), a novel of family, love and loss centered on Gaza City, garnered a global readership and critical acclaim. Her third novel, Against the Loveless World, was published in 2020, again to critical acclaim.

=== Novels ===
- Mornings in Jenin (Bloomsbury, 2010, ISBN 978-1608190461).
- The Blue Between Sky and Water (Bloomsbury, 2015, ISBN 978-1632862228).
- Against the Loveless World (Bloomsbury, 2020, ISBN 978-1526618801).

=== Other ===
- Abulhawa, Susan (2025). "Gaza is Humanity's Moment of Truth". In Davutoglu, Ahmet; Falk, Richard (eds.). Genocide in Gaza: Voices of Global Conscience. SCB Distributors.
- Will the Flower Slip Through the Asphalt: Writers Respond to Capitalist Climate Change, New Delhi: LeftWord Books, 2017.
- This Is Not A Border: Reportage & Reflections from the Palestine Festival of Literature, New York: Bloomsbury, 2017.
- Shattered Illusions, anthology (Amal Press, 2002)
- Searching Jenin, anthology (Cune Press, 2003)
- "Memories of an un-Palestinian story, in a can of tuna" in an anthology: Penny Johnson; Raja Shehadeh (eds.) (2012). Seeking Palestine: New Palestinian Writing on Exile and Home.
- My Voice Sought The Wind, poetry collection (Charlottesville: Just World Books, November 2013)

== Awards ==
- Arab American Book Award Winner
- The Leeway Foundation Edna Andrade 2003 award for fiction and creative non-fiction
- Best Books Award for Historic Fiction
- MEMO Palestine Book Award
- Barbara Deming Memorial Fund Award
- 2021 Aspen Words Literary Prize Finalist
- Arab American Museum Award for Fiction
- Long-listed for Rathsbones Folio Prize
- 2020 Palestine Book Awards Winner
- Finalist for the 2020 Athenaeum of Philadelphia Literary Award

== See also ==
- Censored version of Susan Abulhawa's Oxford Union speech: This House Believes Israel is an Apartheid State Responsible for Genocide
- Jenin – Palestinian city, northern West Bank
