= 2005 in Australian literature =

This article presents a list of the historical events and publications of Australian literature during 2005.

== Events ==
- Morag Fraser is appointed as a judge of the Miles Franklin Award, following the resignation of three judges in late 2004
- Murray Bail is accused of plagiarism over several passages in his novel Eucalyptus. Bail later accepts the breach and intends adding an acknowledgment in future editions
- The Victorian town of Shepparton unveils a statue of Joseph Furphy, author of Such is Life
- Collins Booksellers, Australia's third largest national bookseller, goes into voluntary administration

== Major publications ==
=== Literary fiction ===
- Diane Armstrong – Winter Journey
- Anne Bartlett – Knitting
- Geraldine Brooks – March
- Brian Castro – The Garden Book
- J. M. Coetzee – Slow Man
- Gregory Day – The Patron Saint of Eels
- Robert Drewe – Grace
- Arabella Edge – The God of Spring
- Delia Falconer – The Lost Thoughts of Soldiers
- Kate Grenville – The Secret River
- Sonya Hartnett – Surrender
- Wendy James – Out of the Silence
- Nicholas Jose – Original Face
- Stephen Lacey – Sandstone
- Steven Lang – An Accidental Terrorist
- Carolyn Leach-Paholski – The Grasshopper Shoe
- Andrew McCann – Subtopia
- Roger McDonald – The Ballad of Desmond Kale
- Alex Miller – Prochownik's Dream
- Joanna Murray-Smith – Sunnyside
- Eva Sallis – The Marsh Birds
- Elizabeth Stead – The Book of Tides
- Carrie Tiffany – Everyman's Rules for Scientific Living
- Ian Townsend – Affection
- Christos Tsiolkas – Dead Europe
- Brenda Walker – The Wing of Night
- Tim Winton – The Turning

=== Children's and Young Adult fiction ===
- Randa Abdel-Fattah – Does My Head Look Big in This?
- J. C. Burke – The Story of Tom Brennan
- Isobelle Carmody – Alyzon Whitestarr
- Kate Constable – The Tenth Power
- Gary Crew – The Lace Maker's Daughter
- Mem Fox – Hunwick's Egg
- Morris Gleitzman – Once
- Kerry Greenwood – The Rat and the Raven
- Sonya Hartnett – Surrender
- Barry Jonsberg – It's Not All About You, Calma!
- Justine Larbalestier – Magic or Madness
- Victor Kelleher – Dogboy
- Mardi McConnochie – Fivestar
- Garth Nix – Drowned Wednesday
- Penni Russon – Breathe
- Scott Westerfeld
  - Pretties
  - Touching Darkness
  - Uglies
- Markus Zusak – The Book Thief

=== Crime ===
- Robert G. Barrett – Crime Scene Cessnock
- John Birmingham – Designated Targets: World War 2.2
- Peter Corris – Saving Billie
- Colin Cotterill – Thirty-Three Teeth
- Michelle de Kretser – The Hamilton Case
- Garry Disher – Snapshot
- Greg Flynn – The Berlin Cross
- Robert Gott – A Thing of Blood
- Kerry Greenwood
  - Death by Water
  - Heavenly Pleasures
- Gabrielle Lord – Dirty Weekend
- P. D. Martin – Body Count
- Chris Nyst – Crook as Rookwood
- Leigh Redhead – Rubdown
- Matthew Reilly – Seven Ancient Wonders
- Michael Robotham – Lost
- Heather Rose – The Butterfly Man
- Steve J. Spears – Innocent Murder
- Peter Temple – The Broken Shore

=== Romance ===
- Lilian Darcy – The Father Factor
- Marion Lennox – Bride by Accident

=== Science fiction and fantasy ===
- K. A. Bedford – Eclipse
- Damien Broderick – Godplayers
- Cecilia Dart-Thornton – The Well of Tears
- Marianne de Pierres – Crash Deluxe
- Sara Douglass – Darkwitch Rising
- Greg Egan – "Riding the Crocodile"
- Kate Forsyth – The Shining City
- Catherine Jinks – Evil Genius
- Juliet Marillier – Blade of Fortriu
- Sean Williams
  - Ascent (with Shane Dix)
  - The Blood Debt
  - The Hanging Mountains

=== Drama ===
- Chris Aronsten – Human Resources
- Jane Brodie – A Single Act
- Catherine Lazaroo – Asylum
- Louis Nowra – The Marvellous Boy

=== Poetry ===
- Alan Gould – The Past Completes Me: Selected Poems 1973-2003
- John Kinsella – The New Arcadia
- Jennifer Maiden – Friendly Fire
- Jaya Savige – Latecomers

=== Non-fiction ===
- R.J.B. Bosworth – Mussolini's Italy: Life Under the Dictatorship 1915-1945
- Richard Broome – Aboriginal Victorians: A History Since 1800
- Helen Ennis – Margaret Michaelis: Love, Loss and Photography
- Pamela Freeman – The Black Dress: Mary MacKillop's Early Years
- Tom Keneally – A Commonwealth of Thieves: The Improbable Birth of Australia
- Maria Nugent – Botany Bay: Where Histories Meet

=== Biographies ===
- John Baxter – We'll Always Have Paris: Sex and Love in the City of Light
- Richie Benaud – My Spin on Cricket
- Eric Campbell – Absurdistan: A Bumpy Ride Through Some of the World's Scariest, Weirdest Places
- Maryanne Convoy – Morris West: Literary Maverick
- Peter C. Doherty – The Beginner's Guide to Winning the Nobel Prize: A Life in Science
- Graham Freudenberg – A Figure of Speech: A Political Memoir
- Gavin Fry – Albert Tucker
- Aneurin Hughes – Billy Hughes: Prime Minister and Controversial Founding Father of the Australian Labor Party
- Sandy McCutcheon – The Magician's Son
- William McInnes – A Man's Got to Have a Hobby: Long Summers with My Dad
- Brenda Niall – Judy Cassab: A Portrait
- Barry Pearce – Jeffrey Smart
- Jacob G. Rosenberg – East of Time
- Mandy Sayer – Velocity
- Craig Sherborne – Hoi Polloi
- Steve Waugh – Out of My Comfort Zone
- Elisabeth Wynhausen – Dirt Cheap: Life at the Wrong End of the Job Market

== Awards and honours ==
=== Lifetime achievement ===
Award	Author
Christopher Brennan Award	Fay Zwicky
Patrick White Award	Fay Zwicky

=== Literary ===
Award	Author	Title	Publisher
The Age Book of the Year	Gay Bilson	Plenty: Digressions on Food	Lantern
ALS Gold Medal	Gail Jones	Sixty Lights	Harvill Press
Colin Roderick Award	Peter Temple	The Broken Shore	Text Publishing
Nita Kibble Literary Award	Gay Bilson	Plenty	Lantern

=== Fiction ===
==== International ====
Award	Category	Author	Title	Publisher
Commonwealth Writers' Prize	Best Novel, SE Asia and South Pacific region	Andrew McGahan	The White Earth	Allen and Unwin
Commonwealth Writers' Prize	Best First Novel, SE Asia and South Pacific region	Larissa Behrendt	Home	University of Queensland Press

==== National ====
Award	Author	Title	Publisher
Adelaide Festival Awards for Literature	Not awarded		
The Age Book of the Year Award	Gail Jones	Sixty Lights	Harvill Press
The Australian/Vogel Literary Award	Andrew O'Connor	Tuvalu	Allen and Unwin
Miles Franklin Award	Andrew McGahan	The White Earth	Allen and Unwin
New South Wales Premier's Literary Awards	Tim Winton	The Turning	Picador
Queensland Premier's Literary Awards	Tim Winton	The Turning	Picador
Victorian Premier's Literary Award	Sonya Hartnett	Surrender	Walker Books
Western Australian Premier's Book Awards	Carrie Tiffany	Everyman's Rules for Scientific Living	Picador

=== Children and Young Adult ===
==== National ====
Award	Category	Author	Title	Publisher
Children's Book of the Year Award	Older Readers	Michael Gerard Bauer	The Running Man	Omnibus Books
Children's Book of the Year Award	Younger Readers	Sonya Hartnett	The Silver Donkey	Viking Books
Children's Book of the Year Award	Picture Book	Alison Lester	Are We There Yet? A Journey Around Australia	Viking Books
Children's Book of the Year Award	Early Childhood	Mem Fox, illus. Judy Horacek	Where is the Green Sheep?	Viking Books
Davitt Award	Young Adult	Joanna Baker	Devastation Road	Lothian
New South Wales Premier's Literary Awards	Children's	Sherryl Clark	Farm Kid	Puffin Books
New South Wales Premier's Literary Awards	Young People's	Steven Herrick	By the River	Allen and Unwin
Queensland Premier's Literary Awards	Children's	Prue Mason	Camel Rider	Puffin Books
Queensland Premier's Literary Awards	Young Adult	Joanne Horniman	Secret Scribbled Notebooks	Allen and Unwin
Victorian Premier's Literary Award	Young Adult Fiction	Scott Westerfeld	So Yesterday	Penguin Books
Western Australian Premier's Book Awards	Writing for Young Adults	Anthony Eaton	Fireshadow	University of Queensland Press
Western Australian Premier's Book Awards	Children's	Joanne Crawford and Grace Fielding	A Home for Bilby	Magabala Books

=== Crime and Mystery ===
==== National ====
Award	Category	Author	Title	Publisher
Davitt Award	Novel	Kathryn Fox	Malicious Intent	Macmillan
Davitt Award	Readers' Choice	Leigh Redhead	Peepshow	Allen & Unwin
Davitt Award	Young Adult Novel	Joanna Baker	Devastation Road	Lothian
Ned Kelly Award	Novel	Michael Robotham	Lost	Time Warner Book Group
Ned Kelly Award	First novel	Malcolm Knox	A Private Man	Vintage Books
Ned Kelly Award	True crime	Helen Garner	Joe Cinque's Consolation	Picador
Ned Kelly Award	True crime	Tony Reeves	Mr Big	Allen & Unwin
Ned Kelly Award	Lifetime Achievement	Stuart Coupe		

=== Science fiction ===
Award	Category	Author	Title	Publisher
Aurealis Award	Sf Novel	Damien Broderick	K-Machines	Thunder's Mouth Press
Aurealis Award	Sf Short Story	Sean Williams	The Seventh Letter	"Bulletin" Magazine, Summer Reading Edition
Aurealis Award	Fantasy Novel	Juliet Marillier	Wildwood Dancing	Pan Macmillan
Aurealis Award	Fantasy Short Story	Margo Lanagan	"A Fine Magic"	Eidolon Books (Eidolon I)
Aurealis Award	Horror Novel	Will Elliott	The Pilo Family Circus	ABC Books
Aurealis Award	Horror Novel	Edwina Grey	Prismatic	Lothian Books
Aurealis Award	Horror Short Story	Stephen Dedman	"Dead of Winter"	Weird Tales
Ditmar Award	Novel	Sean Williams	The Crooked Letter	Voyager
Ditmar Award	Novella/Novelette	Paul Haines	"The Last Days of Kali Yuga"	NFG Magazine
Ditmar Award	Short Story	Margo Lanagan	"Singing My Sister Down"	Black Juice
Ditmar Award	Collected Work	Margo Lanagan	Black Juice	Allen & Unwin
Australian Shadows Award		Lee Battersby	"Father Muerte and the Flesh"	Aurealis

=== Poetry ===
Award	Author	Title	Publisher
Adelaide Festival Awards for Literature	Not awarded		
The Age Book of the Year	Dipti Saravanamuttu	The Colosseum	Five Islands Press
Anne Elder Award	Max Ryan	Rainswayed Night	Dangerously Poetic Press
Grace Leven Prize for Poetry	Noel Rowe	Next to Nothing	Vagabond Press
Mary Gilmore Prize	Not awarded		
New South Wales Premier's Literary Awards	Samuel Wagan Watson	Smoke Encrypted Whispers	University of Queensland Press
Queensland Premier's Literary Awards	Sarah Day	The Ship	Brandl and Schlesinger
Victorian Premier's Literary Award	M. T. C. Cronin	<More Or Less Than> 1-100	Shearsman Books
Western Australian Premier's Book Awards	Rod Moran	The Paradoxes of Water: Selected and New Poems, 1970-2005	Salt Publishing

=== Drama ===
Award	Author	Title	Publisher
Patrick White Playwrights' Award	Wesley Enoch	The Story of the Miracles at Cookie's Table	Currency Press

=== Non-Fiction ===
Award	Category	Author	Title	Publisher
Adelaide Festival Awards for Literature	Non-Fiction	Not awarded		
The Age Book of the Year	Non-fiction	Gay Bilson	Plenty: Digressions on Food	Lantern
National Biography Award	Biography	Robert Hillman	The Boy in the Green Suit	Scribe Publications
New South Wales Premier's Literary Awards	Non-fiction	John Hughes	The Idea of Home: Autobiographical Essays	Giramondo Publishing
New South Wales Premier's History Awards	Australian History	Eileen Chanin and Steven Miller	Degenerates and Perverts: the 1939 Exhibition of French and British Contemporary Art	Melbourne University Publishing
New South Wales Premier's History Awards	Community and Regional History	Joe Hajdu	Samurai in the Surf: the Arrival of the Japanese on the Gold Coast in the 1980s	Pandanus Books
New South Wales Premier's History Awards	General History	Sally Neighbour	In the Shadow of Swords: on the Trail of Terrorism from Afghanistan to Australia	HarperCollins
New South Wales Premier's History Awards	Young People's	Allan Baillie	My Story: Riding with Thunderbolt, the Diary of Ben Cross	Scholastic Press
Nita Kibble Literary Award		Gay Bilson	Plenty: Digressions on Food	Lantern
Queensland Premier's Literary Awards	Non-fiction	Geoffrey Bardon and James Bardon	Papunya – A Place Made After the Story	Miegunyah Press
Queensland Premier's Literary Awards	History	Shane White and Graham White	The Sounds of Slavery: Discovering African; History Through Songs, Sermons and Speech	Beacon Press
Victorian Premier's Literary Award	Non-fiction	Robert Dessaix	Twilight of Love: Travels with Turgenev	Picador

== Deaths ==
- 11 April – John Brosnan, sf and cinema writer (born 1947)
- 10 May – Percy Trezise, children's writer (born 1923)
- 13 May – Shelton Lea, poet (born 1946)
- 29 August – Margaret Scott, poet and novelist (born in Bristol, England, 1934)
- 8 September – Donald Horne, social and political commentator (born 1921)
- 14 October – Barney Roberts, poet and short story writer (born 1920)
- 18 October – Philip Martin, poet (born 1931)
- 1 November –
  - Jenny Boult, poet (born 1951)
  - Michael Thwaites, poet (born 1915)
- 22 December – Bill Scott, poet and children's writer (born 1923)

== See also ==
- 2005 in Australia
- 2005 in literature
- 2005 in poetry
- List of years in Australian literature
- List of years in literature
