= The Sydney Morning Herald Best Young Australian Novelists =

Literary award by an Australian newspaper

The Sydney Morning Herald Best Young Australian Novelists award was created in 1997 by the newspaper's literary editor, Susan Wyndham and is made annually. The awards recognise emerging writing talent, and are made to writers who are aged 35 years or younger when their book is first published.

The award criteria were relaxed in 2009 to allow the inclusion of short story collections. That year, Nam Le won the award with his short story collection, The Boat.

The judges change regularly, and the number of writers named as "Best Young Australian Novelist" each year varies. Ten were named in the award's first year.

== Past winners ==
=== 1997–1999 ===
| Year | Author | Title | Publisher |
|---|---|---|---|
| 1997 | Bernard Cohen | Tourism | Picador |
| 1997 | Matthew Condon | The Lulu Magnet | Random House |
| 1997 | Fotini Epanomitis | The Mule's Foal | Allen & Unwin |
| 1997 | Catherine Ford | Dirt and Other Stories | Text Publishing |
| 1997 | Andrew McGahan | 1988 | Macmillan |
| 1997 | Fiona McGregor | Suck My Toes | McPhee Gribble |
| 1997 | Gillian Mears | The Grass Sister | Alfred A. Knopf |
| 1997 | Mandy Sayer | Mood Indigo | Allen & Unwin |
| 1997 | Christos Tsiolkas | Loaded | Vintage Books |
| 1997 | Beth Yahp | The Crocodile Fury | Angus & Robertson |
| 1998 | James Bradley | Wrack | Random House |
| 1998 | Bernard Cohen | The Blindman's Hat | Allen & Unwin |
| 1998 | Luke Davies | Candy | Ballantine Books |
| 1998 | Delia Falconer | The Service of Clouds | Macmillan |
| 1998 | Anthony Macris | Capital: Volume One | Allen & Unwin |
| 1998 | Clare Mendes | A Race Across Burning Soil | Flamingo |
| 1998 | David Snell | The Illustrated Family Doctor | Pan Macmillan |
| 1998 | Emma Tom | Deadset | Vintage Books |
| 1999 | Georgia Blain | Closed for Winter | Penguin |
| 1999 | Bernard Cohen | Snowdome | Allen & Unwin |
| 1999 | Raimondo Cortese | The Indestructible Corpse | Text Publishing |
| 1999 | Lisa Merrifield | Mrs Feather and the Aesthetics of Survival | Flamingo |
| 1999 | Camilla Nelson | Perverse Acts | Text Publishing |
| 1999 | Elliot Perlman | Three Dollars | Picador |

=== 2000–2009 ===
| Year | Author | Title | Publisher |
|---|---|---|---|
| 2000 | James Bradley | The Deep Field | Sceptre |
| 2000 | Julia Leigh | The Hunter | Penguin Australia |
| 2001 | Sonya Hartnett | Thursday's Child | Penguin Australia |
| 2001 | Malcolm Knox | Summerland | Random House |
| 2001 | Hoa Pham | Vixen | Hodder Headline |
| 2002 | Tegan Bennett Daylight | What Falls Away | Allen & Unwin |
| 2002 | Stephen Gray | The Artist Is a Thief | Allen & Unwin |
| 2002 | Andrew Humphreys | The Weight of the Sun | Allen & Unwin |
| 2002 | Irini Savvides | Willow Tree and Olive | Hodder Headline |
| 2003 | Emily Ballou | Father Lands | Picador |
| 2003 | Sonya Hartnett | Of a Boy | Viking (Australia) |
| 2003 | Sarah Hay | Skins | Allen & Unwin |
| 2003 | Chloe Hooper | A Child's Book of True Crime | Penguin |
| 2004 | M. J. Hyland | How the Light Gets In | Penguin |
| 2004 | Louise Limerick | Dying for Cake | Pan Macmillan |
| 2004 | Mardi McConnochie | The Snow Queen | Flamingo |
| 2004 | Nerida Newton | The Lambing Flat | University of Queensland Press |
| 2004 | Matthew Reilly | Scarecrow | Pan Macmillan |
| 2004 | Danielle Wood | The Alphabet of Light and Dark | Allen & Unwin |
| 2005 | Nicholas Angel | Drown Them in the Sea | Allen & Unwin |
| 2005 | Corrie Hosking | Ash Rain | Wakefield Press |
| 2005 | Andrew Humphreys | Wonderful | Allen & Unwin |
| 2005 | Leigh Redhead | Peepshow | Allen & Unwin |
| 2005 | Craig Silvey | Rhubarb | Fremantle Press |
| 2006 | Stephanie Bishop | The Singing | Brandl and Schlesinger |
| 2006 | Leigh Redhead | Rubdown | Allen & Unwin |
| 2006 | Tony Wilson | Players | Text Publishing |
| 2006 | Markus Zusak | The Book Thief | Picador |
| 2007 | Will Elliott | The Pilo Family Circus | ABC Books |
| 2007 | Tara June Winch | Swallow the Air | University of Queensland Press |
| 2007 | Danielle Wood | Rosie Little's Cautionary Tales for Girls | Allen & Unwin |
| 2008 | Belinda Castles | The River Baptists | Allen & Unwin |
| 2008 | Max Barry | Company | Doubleday |
| 2008 | Jessica Davidson | What Does Blue Feel Like? | Pan Macmillan |
| 2008 | Jessica White | A Curious Intimacy | Viking |
| 2009 | Nam Le | The Boat | Alfred A. Knopf |
| 2009 | Alice Nelson | The Last Sky | Fremantle Press |
| 2009 | Kevin Rabalais | The Landscape of Desire | Scribe |
| 2009 | Steve Toltz | A Fraction of the Whole | Hamish Hamilton |

=== 2010–2019 ===
| Year | Author | Title | Publisher |
|---|---|---|---|
| 2010 | Kalinda Ashton | The Danger Game | Sleepers Publishing |
| 2010 | Andrew Croome | Document Z | Allen & Unwin |
| 2010 | Emily Maguire | Smoke in the Room | Picador |
| 2010 | Craig Silvey | Jasper Jones | Allen & Unwin |
| 2011 | Lisa Lang | Utopian Man | Allen & Unwin |
| 2011 | Gretchen Shirm | Having Cried Wolf | Affirm Press |
| 2011 | Kristel Thornell | Night Street | Allen & Unwin |
| 2012 | Melanie Joosten | Berlin Syndrome | Scribe |
| 2012 | Jennifer Mills | Gone | University of Queensland Press |
| 2012 | Rohan Wilson | The Roving Party | Allen & Unwin |
| 2013 | Romy Ash | Floundering | Text Publishing |
| 2013 | Paul D. Carter | Eleven Seasons | Allen & Unwin |
| 2013 | Zane Lovitt | The Midnight Promise | Text Publishing |
| 2013 | Emily Maguire | Fishing for Tigers | Picador |
| 2013 | Ruby J. Murray | Running Dogs | Scribe |
| 2013 | Majok Tulba | Beneath the Darkening Sky | Hamish Hamilton |
| 2014 | Luke Carman | An Elegant Young Man | Giramondo Publishing |
| 2014 | Balli Kaur Jaswal | Inheritance | Sleepers Publishing |
| 2014 | Hannah Kent | Burial Rites | Pan Macmillan |
| 2014 | Fiona McFarlane | The Night Guest | Penguin |
| 2015 | Michael Mohammed Ahmad | The Tribe | Giramondo Publishing |
| 2015 | Ellen van Neerven | Heat and Light | University of Queensland Press |
| 2015 | Maxine Beneba Clarke | Foreign Soil | Hachette |
| 2015 | Omar Musa | Here Comes the Dogs | Penguin |
| 2015 | Alice Pung | Laurinda | Black Inc |
| 2016 | Murray Middleton | When There's Nowhere Else to Run | Allen & Unwin |
| 2016 | Abigail Ulman | Hot Little Hands | Hamish Hamilton |
| 2017 | Rajith Savanadasa | Ruins | Hachette |
| 2017 | Jennifer Down | Our Magic Hour | Text Publishing |
| 2017 | Julie Koh | Portable Curiosities | University of Queensland Press |
| 2017 | Josephine Rowe | A Loving, Faithful Animal | University of Queensland Press |
| 2018 | Jennifer Down | Pulse Points | Text Publishing |
| 2018 | Marija Pericic | The Lost Pages | Allen & Unwin |
| 2018 | Shaun Prescott | The Town | Brow Books |
| 2018 | Pip Smith | Half Wild | Allen & Unwin |
| 2019 | Robbie Arnott | Flames | Text Publishing |
| 2019 | Tom Lee | Coach Fitz | Giramondo Publishing |
| 2019 | Jamie Marina Lau | Pink Mountain on Locust Island | Brow Books |
| 2019 | Ruby J. Murray | The Biographer's Lover | Black Inc |

=== 2020–2024 ===
| Year | Author | Title | Publisher |
|---|---|---|---|
| 2020 | Alice Bishop | A Constant Hum | Text Publishing |
| 2020 | Joey Bui | Lucky Ticket | Text Publishing |
| 2020 | Josephine Rowe | Here Until August | Black Inc |
| 2021 | Vivian Pham | The Coconut Children | Sydney Story Factory |
| 2021 | Jessie Tu | A Lonely Girl Is a Dangerous Thing | Allen & Unwin |
| 2021 | K. M. Kruimink | A Treacherous Country | Allen & Unwin |
| 2022 | Ella Baxter | New Animal | Allen & Unwin |
| 2022 | Michael Burrows | Where the Line Breaks | Fremantle Press |
| 2022 | Diana Reid | Love and Virtue | Ultimo Press |
| 2023 | Jay Carmichael | Marlo | Scribe |
| 2023 | Katerina Gibson | Women I Know | Simon and Schuster |
| 2023 | George Haddad | Losing Face | University of Queensland Press |
| 2024 | André Dao | Anam | Hamish Hamilton |
| 2024 | Emily O'Grady | Feast | Allen & Unwin |
| 2024 | John Morrissey | Firelight | Text Publishing |
