= Tuvalu (disambiguation) =

Tuvalu is a Polynesian island nation.

Tuvalu may also refer to:

- Tuvalu (novel), 2006 novel by Australian author Andrew O'Connor
- Tuvalu (film), a 1999 German film
- Tuvalu (band), a Finnish indie rock band
