= Forest (novel) =

Novel by Sonya Hartnett

- First edition
- Author: Sonya Hartnett
- Language: English
- Genre: Children's novel
- Publisher: Viking (Australia)
- Publication date: 2001
- Publication place: Australia
- Media type: Print (Paperback)
- Pages: 216
- ISBN: 0-670-89920-8
- OCLC: 49594478
- Dewey Decimal: 823/.914 21
- LC Class: PR9619.3.H3345 F67 2001
- Preceded by: Thursday's Child
- Followed by: Of a Boy

Forest is a novel written by the award-winning Australian author Sonya Hartnett. It was first published in 2001 by Viking Australia.

== Dedication ==
"For Greg, who loves cats."

== Epigraph ==
"'Cats, no less liquid than their shadows, Offer no angles to the wind." – A. S. J. Tessimond

== Awards ==
- Won – Children's Book of the Year Award: Older Readers (2002)
- Shortlisted – South Australian Festival Awards for Literature (2002)

== Reception ==
Discussing Forest, Lesley Hawkes finds that "Hartnett offers new and exciting avenues of thought regarding the place of humans in that [Australian] environment."
