= Ten Things I Hate About Me =

2006 young adult novel by Randa Abdel-Fattah

- First edition
- Author: Randa Abdel-Fattah
- Language: English
- Genre: Children's novel
- Publisher: Pan Macmillan Australia Pty Ltd
- Publication date: 1 October 2006
- Publication place: Australia
- Media type: Print (Paperback)
- ISBN: 0-330-42274-X
- OCLC: 224976893
- Preceded by: Does My Head Look Big in This?
- Followed by: Where the Streets Had a Name

Ten Things I Hate About Me is a 2006 young adult novel by Australian author Randa Abdel-Fattah. The book was first released in Australia on October 1, 2006, through Pan MacMillan Australia. Ten Things I Hate About Me was awarded the 2008 Kathleen Mitchell Award for Excellence in Young Adult Writing and was shortlisted for the 2008 Redbridge Book Award.

The book, like many of Abdel-Fattah's novels, covers topics pertaining to discrimination and racism towards Muslims and people of diverse ethnic backgrounds as well as various teenage topics.

== Plot summary ==
The protagonist of the story is 16-year-old Jamilah Towfeek, who lives in Sydney's Western Suburbs. Jamilah is a Lebanese Muslim, though for the past three years of her life she has hidden her true identity from her peers at school. To conceal her identity she dyed her hair blonde, went by the name Jamie and wears blue contacts. Jamie is beginning year ten at Guildford High School, the students there are separated by their ethnic backgrounds. The Anglo students are popular and taunt students with a background that is not Anglo-Saxon. The most popular boy in school is Peter Clarkson, who is notorious for his bullying, his teasing and also his hilarious tricks in class. Peter especially mocks and taunts Timothy, a boy who does not seem to be affected by Peter's opinion and manages to give witty responses to Peter's efforts to belittle him, he is also the only one who really stands up to Peter.

One day at school a bored Jamie receives an email from someone called John. They begin corresponding by email, Jamie pouring all her deepest secrets to John. This includes her mother dying of a heart attack when she was just nine, her hopes, dreams, frustrations, the fact that her father is over-protective and has documented a Stone Age Charter of Curfew Rights and the Ten things she hates about herself.

At the same time Peter begins taking interest in Jamie, Timothy and Jamie are paired for an assignment together. Jamie is torn from being proud of her heritage or being accepted in the in-crowd. She is also amazed at how comfortable and easy she feels with Timothy. She soon befriends Timothy for his personality. Throughout the novel Jamie struggles to accept her true identity, carrying the fear of taunts and rejection from her classmates with her. Jamie goes through many teenage problems such as seeing eye to eye with her over-protective father, being allowed to attend her formal, getting a job, and accepting that her father will remarry.

== Subplots ==
Various other stories also happen in this book. She told her friend Amy about her Muslim background and at the end, the two become best friends, and leave their other friend, Liz behind with the other discriminatory students at school.

== Reception ==
Critical reception for the book was mostly positive. RT Book Reviews gave Ten Things I Hate About Me four and a half stars and nominated it for their 2009 RT Award for Young Adult Novels. The Bulletin of the Center for Children's Books also gave it a positive review, remarking that while the book had some issues Jamie's "character and motivations remain convincing and her self-deprecating humor keeps things from becoming too tract-like".

=== Awards ===
- "Notable Book" by the Children's Book Council (2007)
- Winner, Kathleen Mitchell Award for young writers (2008)
