= Devil's Food (novel) =

2006 crime novel by Australian author Kerry Greenwood

- Author: Kerry Greenwood
- Language: English
- Series: Corinna Chapman
- Genre: Crime novel
- Publisher: Allen & Unwin
- Publication date: 2006
- Publication place: Australia
- Media type: Print
- Pages: 273
- Awards: 2007 Davitt Award, Readers Choice, co-winner
- ISBN: 1741147107
- Preceded by: Heavenly Pleasures
- Followed by: Trick or Treat

Devil's Food is a 2006 crime novel by Australian author Kerry Greenwood.

It is the third novel in the author's Corinna Chapman series of crime novels, following the author's 2004 novel Earthly Delights, and the 2005 novel Heavenly Pleasures.

It was the co-winner of the Readers Choice Davitt Award in 2007, with Silent Death: The Killing of Julie Ramage by Karen Kissane.

== Synopsis ==
Corinna's hippie mother, Starshine, has suddenly arrived on her doorstep with news that Corinna's father, Sunlight, has run off with all their money to find a younger lover. Meanwhile, someone is poisoning people with herbal teas and a malnourished body has turned up.

== Critical reception ==
In The Age newspaper Simon Caterson found the novel to be only tenuously associated with the crime fiction genre: "Readers who like their crime fiction chatty and relatively free of suspense may well warm to Corinna and we can all enjoy her recipes, an appetising selection of which is included at the back of the novel. On the other hand, fans of the sort of crime fiction that focuses on the evil that men (or women) do may find this approach exasperating. It is all a matter of taste, of course, but I much prefer terse to twee."

Ian Hicks, reviewing the novel for The Sydney Morning Herald agreed: "Indeed, it might fairly be said that if this book were a cake, then the plot would be little more than the icing."

== Publication history ==
After the novel's initial publication in Australia by Allen & Unwin in 2006 it was reprinted by Poison Pen Press in the USA in 2009.

== Awards ==
- 2007 Davitt Award Readers Choice, winner

== Notes ==
- Epigraph: He hath shewed strength with his arm; he hath scattered the proud in the imagination of their hearts...(Magnificat, Luke 1: 51-53)
- Dedication: This book is dedicated to Annette Barlow for her great kindness, gentleness, intelligence and unfailing courtesy.

== See also ==
- 2006 in Australian literature
