= Butterfly (novel) =

Novel by Sonya Hartnett

- First edition
- Author: Sonya Hartnett
- Language: English
- Genre: Young adult novel
- Publisher: Hamish Hamilton
- Publication date: 2 April 2009
- Publication place: Australia
- Media type: Print (Paperback)
- Pages: 224 pp (paperback, first edition)
- ISBN: 978-0-241-14446-6 (paperback, first edition)
- OCLC: 297800574
- Preceded by: The Ghost's Child
- Followed by: The Midnight Zoo

Butterfly is a 2009 young adult fiction novel by Sonya Hartnett about the troubled adolescence of Plum Coyle, set in 1980s Australian suburbia.

Hartnett uses the suburban landscape as inspiration for many of her books, including Butterfly.

== Awards and nominations ==
- 2009 shortlisted, The Age Book of the Year Award — Fiction Prize
- 2009 highly commended, Fellowship of Australian Writers Victoria Inc. National Literary Awards — FAW Christina Stead Award
- 2009 shortlisted, Colin Roderick Award
- 2010 shortlisted, Miles Franklin Literary Award
