= Andrew O'Connor =

Andrew O'Connor may refer to:

- Andrew O'Connor (actor) (born 1963), British actor
- Andrew O'Connor (sculptor) (1874–1941), American sculptor
- Andrew O'Connor (writer) (born 1978), Australian novelist
- Andrew O'Connor (musician), guitarist for Lorna Shore
- Andy O'Connor (1884–1980), baseball player
