= Amira Nowaira =

Egyptian academic and writer

Amira Nowaira (Arabic: أميرة نويرة) is an Egyptian academic, translator, columnist and author. She earned her doctorate in English literature from the University of Birmingham. She has served as chair of the English department at Alexandria University, and is currently a professor there. She has published a number scholarly books and journal articles. More recently, she has contributed journalistic pieces to The Guardian. Apart from her own books, Nowaira has also done translations, both from Arabic to English (Ali Bader, Taha Hussein et al.) and from English to Arabic (Susan Bassnett, Randa Abdel-Fattah et al.).

== Books ==
=== As author/editor ===
- Islam, Gender and Modernity (author)
- Growing Up Feminist in a Muslim Land (author)
- Women Writing Africa: The Northern Region (co-editor)

=== As translator ===
- Zeina by Nawal El Saadawi (Arabic to English)
- Zubaida's Window by Iqbal al-Qazwini (co-translator with Azza El Kholy; Arabic to English)
- The Tobacco Keeper by Ali Bader (Arabic to English)
- The Future of Culture in Egypt by Taha Hussein (Arabic to English)
- Comparative Literature: A Critical Introduction by Susan Bassnett (English to Arabic)
- Where the Streets Had a Name by Randa Abdel-Fattah (co-translator with Nabil Nowaira; English to Arabic)
- The Corsair by Abdulaziz al-Mahmoud (Arabic to English)

== See also ==
- List of Arabic-English translators
