= The Lambing Flat =

2003 novel by Nerida Newton

- First edition cover
- Author: Nerida Newton
- Language: English
- Genre: Historical novel
- Publisher: University of Queensland Press
- Publication date: October 2003
- Publication place: Australia
- Media type: Print (Paperback)
- Pages: 273 pp (first edition, paperback)
- ISBN: 0-7022-3386-2 (first edition, paperback)
- OCLC: 53110233
- Dewey Decimal: 823/.92 22
- LC Class: PR9619.4.N49 L36 2003

The Lambing Flat is the first novel by Australian author Nerida Newton; it was first published in 2003. She has since written a second novel, Death of a Whaler.

== Plot ==
The novel is set in the mid-nineteenth century Australian gold rushes.

The main characters are:

- Ella, the daughter of a grazier, who grew up on an isolated, drought-ridden Queensland property.
- Lok and his father who come from China in search of gold. They are caught up in the infamous Lambing Flat riots.

== Awards and recognition ==
Prior to publication, The Lambing Flat won the 2002 Emerging Queensland Author – Manuscript Award at the Queensland Premier's Literary Awards and was highly commended for The Australian/Vogel Literary Award the same year.

Newtown was named one of The Sydney Morning Herald Best Young Australian Novelists in 2004 for The Lambing Flat. It was shortlisted for the Best First Book section of the Asia/Pacific Region of the Commonwealth Writers Prize and One Book One Brisbane in 2004.
