= Heavenly Pleasures =

2005 crime novel by Australian author Kerry Greenwood

- Author: Kerry Greenwood
- Language: English
- Series: Corinna Chapman
- Genre: Crime novel
- Publisher: Allen & Unwin
- Publication date: 2005
- Publication place: Australia
- Media type: Print
- Pages: 278
- Awards: 2006 Davitt Award, Readers Choice, co-winner
- ISBN: 1741145120
- Preceded by: Earthly Delights
- Followed by: Devil's Food

Heavenly Pleasures is a 2005 crime novel by Australian author Kerry Greenwood.

It is the second novel in the author's Corinna Chapman series of crime novels, following the author's 2004 novel Earthly Delights.

It was the co-winner of the Readers Choice Davitt Award in 2006, with Leigh Redhead's novel Rubdown.

== Synopsis ==
Corinna Chapman runs her own bakery, Earthly Delights, and in this novel she helps investigate who is spiking random chocolates with chilli and soy sauce at Heavenly Pleasures, the chocolate shop run by two Belgian sisters just down the street from her own establishment.

== Critical reception ==
In The Advertiser newspaper Katharine England called the novel "a tasty morsel...written with Greenwood's customary verve and wit, and is as warming as onion soup on a cold day and as titillating to the tastebuds as a champagne truffle."

Graeme Blundell, in The Weekend Australian, found the author's "first-person narrative irrepressibly segues from subject to subject with the brisk dispatch of a hotel room maid folding towels. There's so much character the plot constantly vanishes."

== Publication history ==
After the novel's initial publication in Australia by Allen & Unwin in 2005 it was reprinted by Poison Pen Press in the USA in 2008.

== Awards ==
- 2005 Ned Kelly Award, Best Novel, shortlisted
- 2006 Davitt Award for Readers Choice, winner

== Notes ==
- Dedication: This book is dedicated to a very dear Sister-in-Crime, Carmel Shute. A woman of remarkable determination, charisma and kindness.
- Epigraph:

Oppress not the cubs of the stranger,
But hail them as Sister and Brother,
For though they be little and fubsy,
It may be the Bear is their mother. (Rudyard Kipling, The Law of the Jungle)

== See also ==
- 2005 in Australian literature
