= Nerida Newton =

Australian novelist (born 1972)

- Born: 1972 (age 53–54); Brisbane, Queensland, Australia
- Occupation: Literary author
- Writing career
- Period: 2003–2006
- Genres: historical fiction; literary fiction
- Website: www.neridanewton.com

Nerida Newton (born 1972) is an Australian novelist whose first novel, The Lambing Flat, won the Emerging Author category for the Queensland Premier's Literary Awards and was shortlisted for The Australian/Vogel Literary Award. In 2004 the novel was shortlisted the Commonwealth Writers' Prize for the Asia/Pacific region (Best First Book) and One Book One Brisbane. Later that year, Newton was named by the Sydney Morning Herald as one of Australia's best young novelists. Her second novel, Death of a Whaler, was released in 2006.

She has had short stories published in Australian Short Stories and Inkspot, articles published in The Courier-Mail, and has presented at various writer's festivals around Australia.

== Published works ==
- Newton, Nerida (2003). The Lambing Flat. UQP. ISBN 0-7022-3386-2.
- Newton, Nerida (2006). Death of a Whaler. Allen & Unwin. ISBN 1-74114-791-3.
