= Where the Streets Had a Name =

2008 novel by Randa Abdel-Fattah

- First edition cover
- Author: Randa Abdel-Fattah
- Cover artist: Oliver Strewe
- Language: English
- Genre: Children's novel
- Publisher: Pan Macmillan Australia Pty Ltd
- Publication date: 2008
- Publication place: Australia
- Media type: Softcover
- Pages: 307 (311)
- ISBN: 978-0-330-42420-2
- Preceded by: Ten Things I Hate About Me

Where the Streets Had a Name is a young adult novel by Randa Abdel-Fattah. It was published in April 2008, shortly after the death of the author's grandmother. The book won a 2009 Golden Inky Award.

It is the only book of Abdel-Fattah's to contain a dedication, which is to her grandmother, who had died at the age of 98, and to her father, whom she hoped would see Palestine freed in his lifetime.

== Plot ==
13-year-old Hayaat is a Muslim Palestinian girl living in Bethlehem. She lives in a small apartment with her family, who have been displaced from their home: her mother and brothers; her father, grieving the loss of his olive grove; her sister Jihan, who is planning a wedding; and her grandmother Zeynab, who spends her time telling stories from her past. Hayaat is determined and sometimes stubborn, but feels guilt and sadness over an accident from her childhood. She and her best friend Maysaa were caught in the blast from an exploding bomb. Fragments ricocheted off a wall towards Hayaat, scarring her face permanently and killing Maysaa. Frequently, she overhears her mother and grandmother talking, saying Who will marry her with those scars?

When her grandmother becomes ill, Hayaat resolves to travel to Jerusalem to fulfill Zeynab's wish to touch the soil of her ancestral home, believing it will save Zeynab's life. She and her best friend Samy, a Christian Palestinian and fan of football and The X Factor, begin the forbidden six-mile journey on a day they have no curfew. They travel through checkpoints and roadblocks, sneak over the West Bank wall, and meet other Palestinian travelers, a refugee boy named Naseem, and Israeli peace activists. Hayaat also learns more about the accident from her past.

== Themes ==
The novel, set during the Israeli–Palestinian conflict, discusses its themes via a quest-novel structure.

Hamoud Yahya Ahmed Mohsen of Hodeidah University and Ruzy Suliza Hashim of the National University of Malaysia note Fattah's use of the jar of soil, arguing via an ecocritical lens that she uses it to connect Palestinian displacement with ecological concerns.

== Critical reception ==
- Naomi Shihab Nye, writing at The Electronic Intifada, wrote: "It is magnificent to know that the body of literature for young readers has increased so significantly with Where the Streets Had a Name," praising in particular the book's juxtaposition of frank humor, realistic details of daily life, and broader historical themes.
- Publishers Weekly praised the "classic quest" narrative, as well as the portrayal of Hayaat and Samy's friendship.
- Kirkus Reviews called the novel "a refreshing and hopeful teen perspective on the Israeli-Palestinian dilemma."
- Bulletin of the Center for Children's Books reviewer Karen Coats praised the "rich humor and warmth" of the interactions between Hayaat and her family but suggested that the book did not provide enough historical context about the conflict or the religious and cultural differences among characters for middle schoolers to fully understand the story.

== Adaptations ==
In 2017, Eva Di Cesare of Sydney's Monkey Baa Theatre Company adapted the book for stage.

== Translation into other languages ==
- 2010, حينما كان للشوارع أسماء (Arabic), translated by Amira Nowaira and Nabil Nowaira, Bloomsbury Qatar Foundation Publishing.
