= Rubdown =

2005 crime novel by Australian author Leigh Redhead

- Author: Leigh Redhead
- Language: English
- Series: Simone Kirsch
- Genre: Crime novel
- Publisher: Allen & Unwin
- Publication date: 2005
- Publication place: Australia
- Media type: Print
- Pages: 302
- Awards: 2006 The Sydney Morning Herald Best Young Australian Novelists; 2006 Davitt Award, Readers Choice, winner
- ISBN: 1741145538
- Preceded by: Peepshow
- Followed by: Cherry Pie

Rubdown is a 2005 crime novel by Australian author Leigh Redhead.

It is the second novel in the author's Simone Kirsch series of crime novels, following the author's 2004 novel Peepshow.

It was the winner of the Readers Choice Davitt Award in 2006, and the author was named as one of The Sydney Morning Herald Best Young Australian Novelists in 2006.

== Synopsis ==
Simone Kirsch is engaged to check out Tamara Wade, the daughter of a prominent Melbourne family who has been involved with drugs and has worked in a massage parlor. Then Wade is found dead and Kirsch sets out to investigate.

== Critical reception ==
Reviewing the novel in Australian Book Review Tony Smith noted: "Simone is a parody of male PIs and a metaphor for all women facing the 'have it all', post-feminist dilemma, and thus Rubdown is serious satire."

In her report about her time as a judge of the Davitt Award for Sisters in Crime, Sue Turnbull cal this novel "a witty, raunchy and frequently violent read about a stripper turned private eye."

== Publication history ==
After the novel's initial publication in Australia by Allen & Unwin in 2005 it was reprinted by the same publisher in 2007.

It was also translated into German in 2007.

== Awards ==
- 2006 Davitt Award for Readers Choice, winner
- 2006 The Sydney Morning Herald Best Young Australian Novelists
- 2006 Ned Kelly Award, Best Novel, shortlisted

== See also ==
- 2005 in Australian literature
