= Golden Boys (novel) =

2014 novel by Sonya Hartnett

- Author: Sonya Hartnett
- Language: English
- Genre: novel
- Publisher: Penguin, Australia
- Publication date: 2014
- Publication place: Australia
- Media type: Print (Paperback)
- Pages: 238
- ISBN: 9781926428611
- Preceded by: The Children of the King

Golden Boys (2014) is a novel by Australian author Sonya Hartnett.

== Themes ==
Golden Boys is a novel of lost childhood innocence, and the loss of societal patterns of behaviour that allowed young children to roam the streets in the late 70s and early 80s. The novel tells the story of two twelve-year-olds, Colt Jenson and Freya Kiley, who are moving out of childhood as they realise that their families have dark secrets.

== Reviews ==
Linda Funnell in The Sydney Morning Herald found the novel considers many "sombre themes" but is "saturated in a suburban landscape of decades past, where boys ride bicycles through silent streets, play pinball machines at the local milk bar, and hang out in the mouth of the huge stormwater drain beside a patch of waste ground, untroubled by mobile phones or the internet."

Victoria Flanagan in Sydney Review of Books noted that the author "has a talent for writing about difficult or contentious subjects in innovative and sensitive ways".

== Awards and nominations ==
- 2015 shortlisted Miles Franklin Award
- 2015 winner Indie Book Awards Book of the Year – Fiction
- 2015 longlisted Stella Prize
- 2015 longlisted ASAL Awards — ALS Gold Medal
