= Stripes of the Sidestep Wolf =

1999 novel by Sonya Hartnett

- Author: Sonya Hartnett
- Language: English
- Genre: Fiction
- Published: 1999 (Viking)
- Publication place: Australia
- Media type: Print (Paperback)
- Pages: 191
- ISBN: 9780670885077
- OCLC: 45772538

Stripes of the Sidestep Wolf is a 1999 young adult novel by Sonya Hartnett. It is about a young man, Satchel, living in a declining Tasmanian town and his encounter with a wild animal that may be a Thylacine.

Thylacines – once native to mainland Australia and Papua New Guinea – make many appearances in Australian literature despite being extinct since 1936.

== Reception ==
The Sunday Times, in its review, wrote: "Teenagers whose developing intellect is above the gossipy pap and illiterate dialogue that "young adult" writing sometimes embraces will find in Hartnett's latest novel exact and thoughtful writing that gives localised events general resonance...This book not only exercises the mind, but also stirs the heart." Booktrust wrote that "Hartnett’s precise, graceful writing explores the tantalising potential of suspended lives. A hugely-absorbing book that repays slow reading, in which even small events are momentous".

Stripes of the Sidestep Wolf has also been reviewed by Kirkus Reviews, Publishers Weekly, Booklist (starred review), Horn Book Guide Reviews, Voice of Youth Advocates, School Library Journal, and The Daily Telegraph.

It was shortlisted for the Children's Book Council of Australia Book of the Year for Older Readers. It was also named in the Young Adult Library Services Association's 2006 list of Best Books for Young Adults, and the Co-operative Children's Book Center's 2007 list of Books for Curious Kids and Teens.
