= Death of a Whaler =

2006 novel by Nerida Newton

- First edition cover
- Author: Nerida Newton
- Language: English
- Genre: Novel
- Publisher: Allen & Unwin
- Publication date: July 2006
- Publication place: Australia
- Media type: Print (Paperback)
- Pages: 312 pp (first edition, paperback)
- ISBN: 1-74114-791-3 (first edition, paperback)
- OCLC: 74890341
- Dewey Decimal: 823/.92 22
- LC Class: PR9619.4.N49 D43 2006
- Preceded by: The Lambing Flat

Death of a Whaler is a novel written by Australian author Nerida Newton and was first published in 2006. It is Newton's second novel.

== Critical reception ==
Michelle Griffin, reviewing the novel for The Sydney Morning Herald, found both good and bad with the book: "Newton writes in thoughtful prose. But she is so bald in spelling out her themes of fate and redemption that her slight story sinks beneath the weight of her motifs."

Kirkus Reviews called it "Portentous storytelling lifted by a graceful style."

== Notes ==
- Dedication: To Vida, for the joy passed. To Oliver, for the joy to come.
