= Discipline (novel) =

2025 novel by Randa Abdel-Fattah

- Author: Randa Abdel-Fattah
- Language: English
- Publisher: University of Queensland Press
- Publication date: 2 September 2025
- Publication place: Australia
- Media type: Print (paperback)
- Pages: 256
- ISBN: 9780702271014

Discipline is a 2025 novel by Australian author Randa Abdel-Fattah. The book and author have come to public attention after the author's invitation to the 2026 Adelaide Writers' Week was rescinded, and most of the participants boycotted the event, leading to its cancellation.

== Synopsis ==
The novel is set in Sydney, the narrative coinciding with the last major Israeli bombardment of Gaza before the Hamas attacks on Israel on October 7, 2023. . The story centres around three main characters whose lives are transformed after a student at a local Islamic school is arrested and charged with terrorism offences for staging a protest against an Israeli arms manufacturer. Hannah is a young Palestinian journalist investigating the story. Ashraf is an academic. Ashraf's ex-wife, Mya, has become a devout Muslim and moved to Yemen, taking their two teenage daughters, with a new husband. Hannah's husband, Jamal, is a Palestinian PhD student, whose supervisor is Ashraf. Hannah and Jamal have a baby daughter, and are worried about loved ones in Gaza.

== Characters ==
- Hannah, a young newspaper journalist
- Ashraf, an Egyptian Australian academic Jamal's friend and academic advisor
- Jamal, Hannah's husband
- Nabil, a young Arab-Muslim student, who appears only as a media subject in headline news.
- Fayza, head of the Islamic school Nabil attends

== Publication history ==
Discipline was published by University of Queensland Press on 2 September 2025. In her acceptance speech for the 2026 People's Choice Prize in the Victorian Premier's Literary Awards on 25 February 2026, Abdel-Fattah thanked her "visionary publisher" Aviva Tuffield at UQP, saying that she had faced pressure to not publish the book.

== Critical reception ==
The Sydney Morning Herald called Discipline "A bold exploration of media censorship around the Israel-Palestine conflict", and praises its writing as "an engaging story: well-woven, gripping and insightful". The book has received generally good reviews.

== Theme ==
Reporting on Abdel Fattah's October 6, 2026 appearance at London's Trouble Club, World Socialist Web Site reviewer Paul Mitchell wrote: "Discipline is a literary achievement and a document of this moment in history: a record of how cultural institutions, universities and media organisations have aligned with state power to suppress opposition to genocide and war." Reviewer Nour Haydar at The Guardian cites the author's intention to "explore the idea of accountability…I deliberately decided that I would just focus on academia and media as the two most contested sites where this censorship was happening."

Discipline serves as both an indictment and a cautionary tale to academics and journalists, conveyed in Abdel Fattah's opening dedication of her novel:

I humbly dedicate this book to all the Palestinian academics and journalists killed in Gaza who would be alive now if academics and journalists in the West had spoken and acted when they had the chance.

== Awards ==
Discipline was Highly Commended in the 2026 Victorian Premier's Literary Awards Prize for Fiction.

On 25 February 2026, the book won the People's Choice in the Victorian Premier's Literary Awards, which includes a $2000 cash prize money from the Wheeler Centre.

Discipline was shortlisted for both the 2026 Miles Franklin Award and the ALS Gold Medal in the same year.

== Adelaide Writers' Week 2026 ==
Abdel Fattah was due to speak about Discipline at the 2026 Adelaide Writers' Week in February–March, but the Adelaide Festival board decided to disinvite her in January. This led to a boycott by around 180 participants and the resignation of AWW director Louise Adler.

== Sources ==
- Mitchell, Paul. 2026. Randa Abdel-Fattah's novel, Discipline, launched in London. World Socialist Web Site. October 9, 2026. https://www.wsws.org/en/articles/2026/10/09/qnyt-o09.html Accessed 15 October, 2026.
- Haydar, Nour. 2025. "Randa Abdel-Fattah on Gaza, boycotts and her new novel." The Guardian, August 30, 2025. https://www.theguardian.com/books/2025/aug/31/randa-abdel-fattah-gaza-boycotts-new-novel-book-discipline Accessed 15 October, 2026.
- Abdel-Fattah, Randa. 2025. Discipline: A Novel. University of Queensland Press, Brisbane. ISBN 978-0702271014
