= Vivian Pham =

Australian author

Vivian Pham is a Vietnamese-Australian author and advocate. In 2021 she won The Sydney Morning Herald Best Young Australian Novelists award and the Matt Richell Award for New Writer of the Year for her work. She serves on the Library Council of the State Library of New South Wales.

Her first book, The Coconut Children, published in 2020 by Vintage Australia, an imprint of Penguin Books, is set in 1990s Cabramatta. The novel won her recognition as one of The Sydney Morning Herald Best Young Australian Novelists as well as the Matt Richell Award for New Writer of the Year at the Australian Book Industry Awards. It was also shortlisted for both the Victorian Premier's Prize for Fiction and the Voss Literary Prize in 2021.
