= The Glass House (novel) =

Novel by Sonya Hartnett

- First edition
- Author: Sonya Hartnett
- Language: English
- Publisher: Pan Macmillan (Australia)
- Publication date: 1990
- Publication place: Australia
- Media type: Print (Paperback)
- Pages: 189pp.
- ISBN: 0-330-27167-9

The Glass House is a novel written by the Australian novelist, Sonya Hartnett. It was first published in 1990 in Australia by Pan Macmillan.

This was Hartnett’s third novel.

== Plot ==
The Glass House follows six adults in the early 20s for a few weeks of their life. The six meet regularly at their local pub, The Glass House, but it’s what happens outside that really defines them. Henry and Katrina are experiencing the death throes of their relationship, Faine’s crush on Liam is stifling the rest of her life, Simon is looking for love in all the wrong places and Tory sits back and watches it all. When things reach crisis point, no one behaves in a predictable way.
