= The Children of the King =

Book by Sonya Hartnett

- First edition
- Author: Sonya Hartnett
- Language: English
- Genre: Fiction
- Published: 2012 (Penguin Books)
- Publication place: Australia
- Media type: Print (Paperback)
- Pages: 280
- ISBN: 9780670076130
- OCLC: 768488617

The Children of the King is a 2012 children's novel by Sonya Hartnett. It is about the adventures of a mother and her two children who have been evacuated from London to the country side during World War II.

== Reception ==
The Guardian, in its review of The Children of the King wrote "This delicious novel is rich in irony, both linguistically and structurally." and concluded "She [Hartnett] takes her readers into the lush jungle of language and leaves them there, entranced by its sounds."

The Horn Book Magazine wrote "As always, Hartnett's gift for language deftly conveys both the sublime and the mundane in life." and " Hartnett grounds the relatively minor fantasy presence in the book with a heartfelt examination of the pain and hardships, endured by civilians in wartime."

The Children of the King has also been reviewed by Booklist (starred review), Library Media Connection, Voice of Youth Advocates, School Library Journal, Kirkus Reviews (starred review), The Bulletin of the Center for Children's Books. and Booktrust.

It won the 2013 Children's Book of the Year Award for younger readers, and was shortlisted for the 2013 Prime Minister's Literary Award for young adult fiction.

== See also ==
- Evacuations of civilians in Britain during World War II
