= Sadie and Ratz =

Book by Sonya Hartnett

- Author: Sonya Hartnett
- Language: English
- Genre: Fiction
- Published: 2008 (Puffin Books)
- Publication place: Australia
- Media type: Print (Paperback)
- Pages: 66
- ISBN: 9780143303558
- OCLC: 214330204

Sadie and Ratz is a 2008 chapter book by Sonya Hartnett. It is about Hannah, a girl who finds it difficult to adjust to a little baby brother.

== Reception ==
The Horn Book Magazine, in its review of Sadie and Ratz, wrote "This tale of temper and self-control, told in the first person, is more psychologically sophisticated than is usually found in an early chapter book, but the sensitive drawings and clever book design add significantly to the emotional clarity of Hannah's journey." and included it in their 2012 Summer reading list.

Sadie and Ratz had also been reviewed by Booklist (starred review), School Library Journal, Kirkus Reviews (starred review and a 2012 Best Book), Publishers Weekly, and The Bulletin of the Center for Children's Books.

It is a 2009 shortlisted Patricia Wrightson Prize for Children's Literature book, a 2012 School Library Journal Best Book, a 2013 National Council of Teachers of English (NCTE) Notable Children's Book, a 2013 USBBY Outstanding International Book, and a 2013 Childrens and Young Adult Bloggers' Literary Awards (Cybils) Early Chapter Book winner.
