= Mitä muut ajattelevat sinusta? =

EP by Tuvalu
- Released: September 11, 2004
- Genre: Indie rock
- Length: 19:33
- Label: Merceedees Tuotanto
- Producer: Tuvalu

Tuvalu chronology
Mitä muut ajattelevat sinusta? (2004)	Pimeä saartaa meitä! (2006)

Professional ratings
Review scores
Source	Rating
Desibeli.ne	3.5/4 stars
Rockmusica.net	3/5 stars
Noise.fi	5/5 stars

Mitä muut ajattelevat sinusta? is the first work released by the Finnish progressive rock band Tuvalu.

== Track listing ==
1. "Suuret tunteet" — 4:40
2. "Myöhäistä katua" — 4:27
3. "Kuolemankello" — 4:17
4. "Säätyttö" — 6:09
