= The Ghost's Child =

2007 novel by Australian writer Sonya Hartnett

- Author: Sonya Hartnett
- Language: English
- Genre: Fiction
- Publisher: Penguin Books
- Publication date: 2007
- Publication place: Australia
- Media type: Print
- Pages: 178 pp
- ISBN: 9780670029457

The Ghost's Child (2007) is a fantasy novel by Australian writer Sonya Hartnett. The novel was originally published in the Australia by Penguin Books.

== Abstract ==
Returning home one day elderly Matilda finds a young boy sitting in her lounge room. At first a little wary of him, after he declares "I have bad news for her" she engages him in conversation and slowly begins to tell him the story of her life.

== Publishing history ==
Following the book's initial publication by Penguin Books in 2007 it was subsequently reprinted as follows:

- Walker Books, UK, 2008
- Candlewick Press, USA, 2008

The novel was translated into Swedish in 2008 and Penguin Books released a paperback version of the book in 2009.

== Critical reception ==
Writing in Australian Book Review Rebecca Starford called the book "part fable, part love story" and noted that Hartnett's "tales brim with nuance and, though straightforward, are disarmingly sophisticated; her weighty symbolism, saturating the most desiccated of landscapes, is one of the finest in our national literature. In an attempt to catalogue her original voice, Hartnett has often been classified as a children’s or young adult fiction writer, categories that she has resisted, often vehemently, for many years. Although her novels continue to adopt child and teenage perspectives, her literary preoccupations span all ages."

Victoria Flanagan at The Conversation called the book "a whimsical and poignant modern fairy tale that celebrates feminine experience and strength", and "a tender meditation on the life choices and experiences that mould and influence the people we eventually become."

== Awards ==
- CBCA Children's Book of the Year Award for Older Readers, 2008, winner

== See also ==
- 2007 in Australian literature
