= Princes (novel) =

1997 novel by Sonya Hartnett

- First edition
- Author: Sonya Hartnett
- Language: English
- Publisher: Viking (Australia)
- Publication date: 1997
- Publication place: Australia
- Media type: Print (Paperback)
- Pages: 192
- ISBN: 0-670-87821-9
- Preceded by: The Devil Latch
- Followed by: All My Dangerous friends

Princes is a young adult novel by Australian novelist Sonya Hartnett, first published in 1997 in Australia by Viking Press.

== Synopsis ==
Two twins, locked up in what might be a tower, play minds games with each other. They tell each other horror stories about death, poisoning, rats, dissection, starvation, hideous floggings and murder.

== Critical response ==
Publishers Weekly noted the author's "cool bravado" which "could attract a type of cult following" though they wondered if any "adult who would purchase this violent book for a teenager."

Critic Peter Craven in The Age noted the author's "serious and far-out the literary talent" and noted that this "is a book with a deep and dazzling darkness, a neo-expressionist romp in which the real world has receded to a surmise, a pattern of familiarity that is always and everywhere violated."

== Publication history ==
After the novel's initial publication in Australia by Viking, it was reprinted as follows:

- Viking, USA, 1998

The novel was also translated into German in 2005.

The audiobook is narrated by Francis Greenslade.
