= Iqbal al-Qazwini =

Iraqi journalist and novelist

Iqbal al-Qazwini (Arabic:إقبال القزويني) is an Iraqi journalist and novelist. She was exiled in East Berlin, Germany in 1978 when she was in her early 20s, a consequence of Saddam Hussein's rise to power in her homeland. She has lived in Germany ever since. She has been a member of PEN International since 1993.

Al-Qazwini is best known for her 2005 novel Mamarrat al-Sukun (Amman: Dar Azminah, 2005). This was translated into English under the title Zubaida's Window by Azza el-Kholy and Amira Nowaira. As a journalist, al-Qazwini's work has appeared in various German and Arabic periodicals, such as Asharq Al-Aswat and Al Riyadh (newspaper).

== Works ==
A list of her works:

- Publisher and Co-Author of Die schwarze Abaya, Irakische Erzählungen, 1985
- Translation and foreword of Poesie der Indianer, 1986
- Co-Author of Verloren Gewonnen, zwischen Sprachfremde und Wortheimat, 2001
- Translation of Erich Kästner's novel Die Schule der Diktatoren(from German into Arabic), 2002
- Author of the novel Mamarrat as-Sukun (2006), Engl. Zubaida's Window (2008), 2006
- Translation of B. Traven's novel The Death Ship (from German into Arabic), 2014

== Sources ==
- International Association of Writers (2013–2014). "Al-Qazwini, Iqbal, pg.21". PEN Zentrum Deutschland Autorenlexikon. Darmstadt: Peter Hammer Verlag. ISBN 978-3-7795-0421-4.
