= Pimeä saartaa meitä! =

Pimeä saartaa meitä

Studio album by Tuvalu
- Released: (Finland) March 6, 2006
- Genre: Indie rock
- Length: 45:09
- Label: Merceedees Tuotanto
- Producer: Tuvalu

Tuvalu chronology
Mitä muut ajattelevat sinusta? (2004)	Pimeä saartaa meitä (2006)	Viimeiset hetket ovat käsillä! (2008)

Professional ratings
Review scores
Source	Rating
Noise.fi	5/5 stars
Rokkizine.com	4.5/5 stars
Vertigo.cd	8/10 stars

Pimeä saartaa meitä is the second album released by the Finnish progressive rock band Tuvalu.

== Track listing ==
1. "Irma Vep" - 4:14
2. "Maanjäristys" - 4:42
3. "Kadotettu" - 4:17
4. "Järjestys ja kuri" - 4:16
5. "Kiitospäivän ilta" - 6:16
6. "Jaettu modernin unelma" - 3:38
7. "Kiireetön tila" - 6:32
8. "Neuroromantiikkaa" - 3:09
9. "Meditaatio" - 8:05
