= Emily O'Grady =

Australian author

- Born: 1991 (age 34–35); Brisbane, Australia
- Occupation: Author
- Writing career
- Notable work: Feast
- Notable awards: The Australian/Vogel Literary Award (2018)

Emily O'Grady (born 1991) is an Australian author. She won the 2018 The Australian/Vogel Literary Award for her debut novel The Yellow House and was shortlisted for the 2024 Stella Prize for her second novel Feast. In 2024 she was one of three authors named as The Sydney Morning Herald Best Young Australian Novelists.

== Early life and education ==
Emily O'Grady was born in 1991 in Brisbane, Australia. She studied creative writing at university and initially planned to work in the publishing industry, but decided to pursue a career as an author after some of her short stories were published in literary journals. She holds a PhD from the Queensland University of Technology, where she has also taught creative writing.

== Career ==
O'Grady began writing her first novel, The Yellow House, as part of a course she undertook while studying towards a Bachelor of Fine Arts at the Queensland University of Technology. The novel is narrated by a 10-year-old girl named Cub whose grandfather committed a series of murders before she was born. O'Grady has explained that she had been interested in true crime since she was a child, and that the novel had been inspired by the conviction of Matthew Milat, great-nephew of serial killer Ivan Milat, for murder. The manuscript for The Yellow House was the winner of the 2018 The Australian/Vogel Literary Award and was published by Allen and Unwin in April 2018. Louise Swinn reviewed the book in The Sydney Morning Herald, writing that it was a polished first novel with a dark and unsettling narrative and a chilling momentum. In a review published in Australian Book Review, Jay Daniel Thompson praised O'Grady's storytelling skills and described the novel as having an understated air of suspense and intrigue.

O'Grady's second novel, Feast, was published by Allen and Unwin in May 2023. The work is a gothic novel that follows a reclusive couple living in a dilapidated Scottish mansion. The novel's setting was loosely based on Craigend Castle, which had once belonged to one of O'Grady's maternal ancestors. O'Grady undertook a trip to Scotland in 2019 to conduct research for the novel, where she walked the Cateran Trail and visited Craigend Castle. The novel was positively received by reviewers upon its release and was shortlisted for the 2024 Stella Prize. In The Sydney Morning Herald, Jo Case wrote that the novel invited readers to reappraise notions of consent and power in the post-#MeToo era and described it as unsettling and exquisitely paced. In The Guardian, Bec Kavanagh described the novel as a "triumph" and praised O'Grady's rendering of her characters.

== Works ==
- The Yellow House (2018) ISBN 9781760529932
- Feast (2023) ISBN 9781761067112
