= Josephine Rowe =

Australian author

- Occupation: Author
- Writing career
- Notable work: Here Until August

Josephine Rowe is an Australian author known for her short story collections, including Here Until August, and her two novels A Loving, Faithful Animal and Little World. She is a two-time The Sydney Morning Herald Best Young Australian Novelist and was shortlisted for the 2020 Stella Prize for her short story collection Here Until August.

== Career ==
Rowe's short story collection Tarcutta Wake was published by the University of Queensland Press in 2012. The collection was longlisted for the 2013 Frank O'Connor International Short Story Award. In a review in Australian Book Review, William Heyward wrote that the collective was somewhat formulaic and monochromatic, but that its stories were mysterious and satisfying. Reviewing the collection for Overland, Tony Birch wrote that Rowe's writing deserved to be read more widely and that she was a talented writer of "micro-fiction". Her story, "Real Life" was published in Granta.

In 2016 Rowe's first novel A Loving, Faithful Animal was published by the University of Queensland Press. The book was longlisted for the Miles Franklin Award and was shortlisted for the Voss Literary Prize and the fiction prize at the Adelaide Festival Awards for Literature. In a review in The New York Times, Samantha Hunt wrote that the novel featured "gorgeous, precise language" and a compelling cast of characters. In The Sydney Morning Herald, Emma Young praised the novel for its "measured and concise writing" and its exploration of grief and trauma. Reviews in the Financial Times and Australian Book Review similarly praised the precision of Rowe's writing style.

Rowe's next short story collection Here Until August was published by Black Inc in 2019. The collection was shortlisted for the 2020 Stella Prize and was shortlisted for the short story collection prize at the 2020 Queensland Literary Awards. In a review in The New York Times, Siobhan Jones praised the collection for its diverse collection of settings. Reviewing the work in The Saturday Paper, Roanna Gonsalves described it as "a superb collection, pared back, astute, yet brimming with life and love and expectation".

In 2025, Rowe's novel Little World was published by Black Inc. The novel received somewhat mixed reviews. In The Guardian, Beejay Silcox wrote that Rowe's writing was characteristically gorgeous, but that the novel felt hollow and lacked answers to the questions it posed. Tony Hughes-d'Aeth gave a more positive review of the novel in The Conversation, writing that it had an exquisite lyricism. In Australian Book Review, Maria Takolander described the novel as "grandly and enduringly enigmatic" and described it as a work of magical realism. Little World was shortlisted for the University of Queensland Fiction Book Award at the 2025 Queensland Literary Awards. It was longlisted for the Republic of Consciousness Prize US and Canada. In 2026 it was shortlisted for the Miles Franklin Award.

== Works ==
=== Novels ===
- A Loving, Faithful Animal (2016) ISBN 9780702253966
- Little World (2025) ISBN 9781760645427

=== Short story collections ===
- How a Moth Becomes a Boat (2010) ISBN 9780980397420
- Tarcutta Wake (2012) ISBN 9780702249303
- Here Until August (2019) ISBN 9781863959933
