= Kathleen Mitchell Award =

Australian literature prize for young authors

The Kathleen Mitchell Award is a bi-annual Australian literature prize for young authors. It was established in 1996 and is awarded every second year with prize money originally being A$5000, by 2012 that amount had grown to A$ 15,000 and in 2014 it increased to A$ 20,000. After not being awarded in 2016 it was awarded again in 2019 with a prize money of A$ 15,000.

The prize was established in the will of Kathleen Mitchell with the following aim: "the advancement, improvement and betterment of Australian literature, to improve the educational style of the authors, and to provide them with additional amounts and thus enable them to improve their literary efforts". The price is managed by The Trust Company and a committee of 3 jurors is awarding the price every 2 years. Only Australian authors under the age of 30 are eligible to participate.

The Australian called it a "leading literary award".

== Winners ==
Kathleen Mitchell Award winners
Year	Author	Title	Ref.
1996	Sonya Hartnett	Sleeping Dogs	
1998	James Bradley	Wrack	
2000	Julia Leigh	The Hunter	
2002	No award		
2004	Lucy Lehmann	The Showgirl and the Brumby	
2006	Markus Zusak	The Book Thief	
2008	Randa Abdel-Fattah	Ten Things I Hate About Me	
2010	Nam Le	The Boat	
2012	Melanie Joosten	Berlin Syndrome	
2014	Majok Tulba	Beneath the Darkening Sky	
2016	No award		
2019	Holden Sheppard	Invisible Boys	
2021	Sophie Overett	The Rabbits	
2023	Dylin Hardcastle	A Language of Limbs	
2025	Winnie Dunn	Dirt Poor Islanders	
