= The River Baptists =

2007 novel by Belinda Castles

- Author: Belinda Castles
- Language: English
- Genre: novel
- Publisher: Allen & Unwin, Australia
- Publication date: 2007
- Publication place: Australia
- Media type: Print (Paperback)
- Pages: 287
- ISBN: 9781741751932
- Preceded by: Falling Woman
- Followed by: Hannah and Emil

The River Baptists (2007) is a novel by Australian author Belinda Castles. It won The Australian/Vogel Literary Award in 2006.

== Plot summary ==
The novel is set in a riverside community and tells the stories of pregnant Rose, grieving her dead father and waiting for the arrival of her baby; Danny, who runs the local water-taxi service and is hiding from his violent father; and the members of the local community.

== Notes ==
- Dedication: For Brad and Ellie, with love.
- Epigraph: "Lord help me... / because my boat is so small, / And your sea is so immense." - Medieval French prayer

== Reviews ==
- Lorien Kaye in The Age noted "The River Baptists starts quietly but gradually ratchets up the tension. The transformation is subtle enough to be credible. It is impossible to resist river-related metaphors to describe this novel, filled as it is with undertows and undercurrents; ultimately, the reader is swept away."
- The Australian/Vogel Literary Award judges, Matt Buchanan and Jenny Tabakoff, in The Sydney Morning Herald: "Thoughtful and well-paced book, with tension mounting nicely and a lovely evocation of the river and its characters. A very satisfying read."

== Awards and nominations ==
- 2006 winner The Australian/Vogel Literary Award
