= The Midnight Zoo =

2010 novel by Sonya Hartnett

- Author: Sonya Hartnett
- Language: English
- Genre: Juvenile fantasy
- Publisher: Viking Penguin
- Publication date: 1 November 2010
- Publication place: Australia
- Media type: Print (hardcover and paperback)
- Pages: 186
- Awards: Carnegie Medal (shortlisted)
- ISBN: 9781406331493
- OCLC: 692664057
- Dewey Decimal: A823.3
- LC Class: PR9619.3.H3345 M53 2010

The Midnight Zoo is a 2010 novel by Sonya Hartnett. It was first published on 1 November 2010 in Australia and was then released in the United States a year later. It follows the story of two gypsy boys that find an abandoned zoo after fleeing a traditional celebration. The novella has gained critical praise for its "lyrical" prose and for the illustrations in the United States version, done by artist Andrea Offermann.

== Plot ==
It is midnight in a destroyed village somewhere in Europe. Through the moonlight, two boys, one with a baby in his backpack, come walking. The realism of the opening paragraphs is disrupted by the personification of Night. Clearly we are in for a fabulist story.

The two boys have been on the road for weeks, scrounging an existence in a landscape often devoid of humanity and sustenance. The back-story to the boys’ current situation reveals itself slowly: their family has been slaughtered by soldiers two months previously. They find a pitiful zoo which miraculously has survived the war that has ravaged its village. Also miraculous is that each of the animals in the zoo speaks to the boys.

Over the course of one night, we are given the stories of the animals, the zoo, and its most recent zookeepers. This is not a chronological telling but the narrative events come to us almost like a play, with limited settings, such as glimpses of the boys’ travels, the zoo, and the Rom camp. The structure of the novel is instrumental in our interpretation of events. While the story can be read as a narrative of survival during war, much of its significance operates beneath the surface of realism. Symbolic meanings are fundamental to understanding the narrative: its time frame, the survival of the zoo, its midnight setting.

== Critical reception ==
The Midnight Zoo received positive reviews from critics, mostly for the "lyrical" prose and the illustrations from Andrea Offermann in the American version. Kirkus Reviews called it "[a]n evocative story" with "lyrical, spare prose". Booklist was similarly favorable, but it said that the ending "may confuse some readers". Publishers Weekly gave it a starred review and said that Harnett "mak[es] a profound case for the futility of war while exploring questions about responsibility and freedom." Library Journal also gave it a starred review, saying that it was also good for adults who were "interested in wartime fiction and thought-provoking, fable-like tales", while its juvenile companion School Library Journal called it a "beautiful and sad book [that] will stay with readers long after the story is done."

== Awards and nominations ==
The Midnight Zoo won the CBCA Children's Book of the Year Award for Older Readers in 2011. It was also shortlisted for the CILIP Carnegie Medal in 2012.
