= The Silver Donkey =

Novel by Sonya Hartnett

- First edition
- Author: Sonya Hartnett
- Illustrator: Anne Spudvilas
- Language: English
- Genre: Children's novel
- Publisher: Viking (Australia)
- Publication date: 2004
- Publication place: Australia
- Media type: Print (Hardback & Paperback)
- Pages: 191
- ISBN: 0-670-04240-4

The Silver Donkey is a 2004 children's novel by Sonya Hartnett, set during World War I. It won a CBCA award and has been adapted for the stage.

== Plot summary ==
The book traces the journey of an English soldier who comes across two young girls, Marcelle and Coco, in the rural French town of Wissant. The girls help the soldier, who suffers from psychological blindness as a side-effect of post-traumatic stress, to plan a way to cross the English Channel back to his brother. The girls bring him food and in return he tells them moralistic tales about courage, perseverance and trying your best against all odds. Though his stories are fiction, one is not, but may be suspected to be fake because of the shell shock: the story of his younger brother John who, while extremely ill, finds a small silver donkey whilst digging in the garden. The soldier carries the silver donkey with him everywhere for luck, hope and inspiration, which the soldier claims will spread to Coco when he gives her the donkey.

The story can be seen in two ways: from an adult's perspective or from that of an innocent child. The soldier could be lying in order to get the girls to help him get to the other side of the channel, or he could be telling the truth.

== Reception ==
The book won the 2005 Courier Mail award for young readers and the 2005 CBCA Book of the Year award for younger readers. It also won the 2007 COOL Award Fiction for Years 7-9.

== Adaptation ==
In 2006 it was adapted into a successful musical by Australian writing/directing team Matthew Frank (music) and Dean Bryant (book and lyrics). Produced by the Children's Performing Company of Australia and Echelon Productions, the musical played a limited season in Melbourne, Australia before embarking on an ambitious journey touring the United States, performing in San Francisco, New York City, Orlando, Washington D.C. and Las Vegas. The original cast members were all between the ages of 10 and 20. The Original Studio Cast Recording for the show was completed for publicity and licensing purposes in late 2006. Recorded cast members include James Bryers as Lieutenant, Andrew Kronert as Ernie, Josie Lane as Ruth, Lugi Emile Lucente as Joseph, Chris Scalzo as Sky, Annie Johnstone as Marcelle and Georgie Darvidis as Coco.

In September 2008 the show returned to America with a mainly new Australian cast, traveling to Boston, Los Angeles, New York and San Francisco to perform the show.
