= Malicious Intent (novel) =

Book by Kathryn Fox

- First edition
- Author: Kathryn Fox
- Language: English
- Series: Anya Crichton
- Genre: novel
- Publisher: Macmillan, Australia
- Publication date: 2004
- Publication place: Australia
- Media type: Print Paperback
- Pages: 345
- Awards: 2005 Davitt Award – Best Adult Novel, winner
- ISBN: 1405035757
- Followed by: Without Consent

Malicious Intent (2004) is a crime novel by Australian author Kathryn Fox.

It won the Davitt Award for Best Adult Novel and was shortlisted for Ned Kelly Awards – Best First Novel in 2005.

== Plot summary ==
Pathologist and forensic physician, Dr Anya Crichton, discovers a link between the death of a teenage girl from a drug overdose and a number of apparent suicides.

== Notes ==
- Dedication: To Mum and Dad for giving me the heart, soul and wings to fly. With eternal thanks, respect and love.

== Reviews ==
Philippa Stockley in The Washington Post called the novel "Oddball but brilliant". Sophie Groom in Australia reviewed it as well

== Awards and nominations ==
- 2005 shortlisted Ned Kelly Awards – Best First Novel
- 2005 winner Davitt Award – Best Adult Novel
