= Feast (novel) =

2023 novel by Emily O'Grady

- Author: Emily O'Grady
- Language: English
- Publisher: Allen & Unwin
- Publication date: 30 May 2023
- Publication place: Australia
- ISBN: 1761186736
- OCLC: 1371953171

Feast is a novel written by Australian author Emily O'Grady. It follows Alison, a pregnant 48-year-old former actress living in a mansion in the Scottish Highlands with her partner Patrick, a former rock star, who are visited by Neve, Patrick's daughter and Allison's stepdaughter, and Neve's mother Shannon.

== Reception ==
Bec Kavanagh of The Guardian called the novel "meaty and provocative in its exploration of power, desire and the hunger for something more", praising O'Grady's "admirable" ability to "craft a tense and compelling story within the confines of this house, over a single weekend". Ross Fitzgerald of The Weekend Australian called it "gripping", "thrilling" and "utterly compelling". Jo Case of The Sydney Morning Herald opined that the novel's "exquisitely paced revelations are calculatedly opaque, rewarding active reading." Erin Stewart of ArtsHub gave the novel a 3.5/5 rating, writing that while it is a "little wanting in terms of its overall arc", O'Grady "masterfully evokes an infectiously tense mood and the complex balance of cruelty and kindness that exists within us and our relationships." The novel was shortlisted for the 2024 Stella Prize.
