= Surrender (novel) =

Novel by Sonya Hartnett

- First edition
- Author: Sonya Hartnett
- Language: English
- Genre: Novel
- Publisher: Viking Penguin (Australia)
- Publication date: 2005
- Publication place: Australia
- Media type: Print (Hardback, Paperback)
- Pages: 248
- ISBN: 0-670-02871-1
- OCLC: 156765183

Surrender is a novel written by the award-winning Australian novelist, Sonya Hartnett. It was first published in 2005 in Australia by Walker Books. It is narrated by twenty-year-old Gabriel, who is dying, and twenty-year-old Finnigan, a homeless boy who is Gabriel's only friend.

== Plot ==
Seven-year-old Anwell lives in a prestigious but coldly distant family with a mother who is always sick and a father who punishes him with physical abuse. Anwell has no friends and is on a very tight leash. He is sitting in the back yard one day when he meets wild boy his age named Finnigan, his alter-ego or second personality. Anwell now named Gabriel is never ready to be angry and never to fight. Finnigan always ready be angry and to fight. If Gabriel (Anwell) wants revenge or anything bad done, he asks Finnigan to do it for him.

Finnigan becomes Anwell's only friend, and Anwell confides in him what he has never told anyone else, of how he accidentally killed his handicapped older brother Vernon. His brother, though he was three years older than Anwell, "was never the elder of us". His parents, disgraced and humiliated by Vernon, refuse to take care of him, leaving Anwell to do the job at the young age of seven. Enjoying his task, Anwell routinely feeds, washes, and entertains his brother. One Sunday, while his father is out to church and his mother is sleeping due to a migraine, Anwell is again taking care of Vernon. When Anwell is trying to feed Vernon, he refuses, would not stop crying, and scratches Anwell on his cheek, drawing blood. Out of frustration, and anxiety their mother will wake up and be irate, Anwell puts fabric in Vernon's mouth to quiet him and throws his brother in a refrigerator.

Finnigan becomes the town arsonist, lighting the town aflame piece by piece in an act of revenge for Gabriel, but Finnigan is soon out of control and the only way for Gabriel to stop Finnigan is for Gabriel to kill himself at the young, "martyr's age" of twenty by condemning himself to a mentally caused illness.

== Author's Summary ==
As life slips away, Gabriel looks back over his brief twenty years, which have been clouded with frustration and humiliation. A small town and distant parents ensure that he is never allowed to forget the horrific mistake he made as a child. He has only two friends - his dog, Surrender, and the wild boy, Finnigan, with whom he made a boyhood pact. When a series of arson attacks grips the town Gabriel realizes how dangerous Finnigan is and that only the most extreme measures will rid Gabriel of him for good.

== Awards ==
Surrender received recognition as a 2007 Best Book for Young Adults from the American Library Association and was a Michael L. Printz Honor Book.
