= Sandy McCutcheon =

Australian writer

Kerry O'Brien and McCutcheon at Woodford Folk Festival 2009

McCutcheon at Woodford Folk Festival 2009

Robert Hamish McCutcheon (born 1947), known as Sandy McCutcheon is an Australian author, playwright, actor, journalist and broadcaster.

== Biography ==
McCutcheon was born Brian David Parry in Christchurch, New Zealand, though he did not learn this until 1997, aged 50, when his adoption papers were discovered. When he was nearly three, his parents divorced and he was adopted by another family, who renamed him as Robert, nicknamed Sandy. His adoptive parents denied that he was adopted and told him his early childhood memories were the product of his imagination. As an adult, he spent several years trying to trace his family in Europe, before finding relatives living in New Zealand. During the search he met his 30-year-old daughter Yvonne for the first time, who he had fathered in London when he was 20. He also discovered that his birth mother had been adopted.

He moved to Australia in 1970 and now lives in Fez, Morocco with his wife, photographer Suzanna Clarke. He is involved in the Woodford Folk Festival, the Festival of Sufi Culture (in Fez) and the Festival of World Sacred Music (in Fez). He has had four children from three marriages, as well as Yvonne.

Until late 2006, McCutcheon hosted talkback radio program Australia Talks Back, since renamed Australia Talks, on ABC Radio National. Australia Talks Back was the only continent-wide talkback radio program, as well as gathering listeners from around the world through the internet and Radio Australia shortwave broadcasts. It ran for an hour every weekday and featured discussion of a particular topic every day, reviewing the week's topics on Friday. Since leaving the ABC he has returned to his career as a writer and public speaker.

McCutcheon's earlier work included presenting ABC's Double Jay, later Triple J, now an Australia-wide radio station. Before that he worked at radio stations in Townsville and Hobart.

McCutcheon has produced radio documentaries in Bosnia, China, Finland, Malaysia, Mozambique, Singapore, South Africa, Sudan (North and South) and Yugoslavia.

McCutcheon has won Australian radio awards and been recognised at the New York International Radio Festival.

McCutcheon has been awarded the International Kalevala Medal for services to Finnish culture (for his work on the Kalevala). He has worked in Finland on a scholarship, and in particular, at the Finnish Broadcasting Company.

McCutcheon has written 22 plays for the theatre. He won the Samuel Weisberg Playwriting Award in 1991 for the best Jewish play of the year for Night Train, as he had for a long time believed himself to be Jewish, before finding out the truth about his ancestral past.

McCutcheon founded the Illusion Farm, based in the Tasmania mountains, a Buddhist centre providing care for people in need, free of charge. It has accommodated more than 3,000 people during its operation. The Illusion Circus Theatre Company has also been based on the farm.

== Bibliography ==
McCutcheon has written a number of bestselling novels. His first, In Wolf's Clothing (1997), was the runner-up in the 1995 HarperCollins National Fiction Prize out of 400 novels. His other novels include

- Peace Crimes (1998)
- Poison Tree (1999)
- Safe Haven (2000)
- Delicate Indecencies (2002)
- The Haha Man (2003)
- The Cobbler's Apprentice (to be published September 2006)
- Black Widow (2006)

Black Widow is based on events following the 1 September 2004 terrorist attack on a Russian school in the southern town of Beslan.

Other books by McCutcheon are Blik! (2002), an illustrated book for children and Quirky Questions (2000) New edition of More Quirky Questions (2005).

McCutcheon has also written many short stories and poems. His memoir, The Magician's Son, published in 2005 by Penguin, is an autobiographical work. The title is taken from a dream he had about finding his birth father, in which he discovered a magician's trunk in an attic. When he found out who his birth parents were, he learned that his father had in fact been an amateur magician.

== Resources and external links ==
- Sandy McCutcheon's Moroccan web site
- Australia Talks Back
- ABC Radio National Australia Talks Back Presenter -- Sandy McCutcheon
- Murray Waldren's article about Sandy McCutcheon
- Lily Bragge, Finding Sandy, The Sunday Age, 17 July 2005.
