= Paul D. Carter =

Australian teacher and writer

Paul D. Carter (born 1980) is an Australian teacher and author. In 2012, he won The Australian/Vogel Literary Award for his first novel Eleven Seasons.

== Life ==
Paul D. Carter was born in Melbourne, Victoria, and grew up supporting the Collingwood Football Club. He completed a Bachelor of Arts at Deakin University in 2001.

== Literary career ==
During his PhD studies at Deakin University, D. Carter started to work on his first novel, which took nine years to complete. Published in 2012, Eleven Seasons is a coming-of-age story about a young Australian rules footballer, Jason Dalton, growing up in suburban Melbourne during the 1980s and 90s. The novel explores the role football, family and relationships play in shaping the protagonist's identity.

== Works ==
Novels

- Eleven Seasons (2012)

== Awards and nominations ==
- 2012: The Australian/Vogel Literary Award for Eleven Seasons
