= Here Until August =

2019 short story collection by Josephine Rowe

- Author: Josephine Rowe
- Genre: Short fiction
- Publisher: Black Inc
- Publication date: 3 September 2019
- Publication place: Australia
- Pages: 208
- ISBN: 9781863959933

Here Until August is a 2019 short story collection by Josephine Rowe. The collection was published in Australia by Black Inc in September 2019 and in the United States by Penguin Random House in October 2019. The collection received positive reviews and was shortlisted for the 2020 Stella Prize.

== Summary ==
The collection is composed of ten short stories: Glisk, Real Life, Anything Remarkable, Sinkers, Post-Structuralism for Beginners, Chavez, The Once-Drowned Man, A Small Cleared Space, Horse Latitudes and What Passes for Fun.

== Reception ==
Here Until August received positive reviews. A review in the New York Times Review of Books praised the collection for the diverse settings of each story, writing that the collection "makes you feel as if you’ve traveled the world". The collection received a starred review in Kirkus Reviews, which labelled the stories "pitch-perfect examinations of place and psyche from a writer to watch closely". In a review in Australian Book Review, Bronwyn Lea described the stories as "idiosyncratic, multifaceted, and exquisitely structured", while directing particular praise towards the opening story Glisk. In The Saturday Paper, Roanna Gonsalves described Here Until August as a "superb collection, pared back, astute, yet brimming with life and love and expectation". Reviewing the collection in Westerly, Jen Bowden praised both the vivid characters and landscapes of the collection, and the poetic quality of Rowe's prose.

== Awards ==
Awards for Here Until August
Year	Award	Category	Result	Ref.
2020	Stella Prize	—	Shortlisted	
2020	Queensland Literary Awards	University of Southern Queensland Steele Rudd Award for a Short Story Collection	Shortlisted	
