= Peepshow (novel) =

2004 crime novel by Australian author Leigh Redhead

- Author: Leigh Redhead
- Language: English
- Series: Simone Kirsch
- Genre: Crime novel
- Publisher: Allen & Unwin
- Publication date: 2004
- Publication place: Australia
- Media type: Print
- Pages: 293
- Awards: 2005 The Sydney Morning Herald Best Young Australian Novelists; 2005 Davitt Award, Readers Choice, winner
- ISBN: 1865086371
- Preceded by: -
- Followed by: Rubdown

Peepshow is a 2004 crime novel by Australian author Leigh Redhead.

It is the first novel in the author's Simone Kirsch series of crime novels.

It was the winner of the Readers Choice Davitt Award in 2005, and the author was named as one of The Sydney Morning Herald Best Young Australian Novelists in 2005.

== Synopsis ==
When the body of Francesco Parisi, owner of the Red Room men's club, is found floating in the bay off St. Kilda beach, stuffed in a black garbage bag, his brother Salvatore goes looking for revenge. When he fixates on stripper Chloe her friend and colleague Simone Kirsch offers to find the real killer and goes undercover at the club as a stripper and lap dancer.

== Critical reception ==
Reviewing the novel for The Weekend Australian reviewer Graeme Blundell called the novel's protagonist his "kind of private eye". He went on to refer to the book as a "witty, quite brilliant first novel".

Anita Rose-Innes, in The Age, found that the "real surprises in this first novel are the appealing cast of characters, most of them women (but including some appealing men), the well-managed dialogue and the wry and optimistic character of the protagonist."

== Publication history ==
After the novel's initial publication in Australia by Allen & Unwin in 2004 it was reprinted as follows:

- 2007 Allen & Unwin, Australia
- 2009 Prime Books, USA

It was also translated into German in 2006 and into Czech in 2008.

== Awards ==
- 2005 Davitt Award for Readers Choice, winner
- 2005 The Sydney Morning Herald Best Young Australian Novelists

== See also ==
- 2004 in Australian literature

== Notes ==
- Dedication: To all strippers everywhere but especially Dotti, Donna, Lara and Miranda.
- The author spoke to Andra Jackson of The Age newspaper about the novel.
