= Fotini Epanomitis =

Australian novelist

Fotini Epanomitis is an Australian novelist. Her first novel, The Mule's Foal, won the 1994 Commonwealth Writers' Prize, best first book, South East Asia and South Pacific, and the 1992 Australian Vogel Award.

== Early years ==
Epanomitis's parents migrated from Greece to Perth and she was born in Australia that same year. She graduated from Curtin University with a BA (Hons), and an MA in Literature. She went on to teach literature at various Australian universities.

== Works ==
- The mule's foal, Allen & Unwin, 1993, ISBN 978-1-86373-454-7
  - Ta votania tēs Mirelas, Nea Synora, 1995, ISBN 978-960-236-492-5
  - Mulino žrebe, Translator Nina Kokelj, Goga, 2001, ISBN 978-961-90796-9-0
- Helen Merrick; Tess Williams, eds. (1999). "All That Was Needed". Women of other worlds: excursions through science fiction and feminism. UWA Publishing. ISBN 978-1-876268-32-9.
