= Belinda Castles =

Australian novelist

Belinda Castles (born 1971) is an English-born Australian novelist. Her second novel, The River Baptists, won the 2006 Australian/Vogel Award.

== Life ==
Castles moved to Australia in 1996. She works as an editor when not writing. With her husband and two daughters she lives near Sydney.

== Writing ==
In describing her novel River Baptists, Castles said: "It's quite a soapie. My favourite writing is literary soap, with lots of dramas and interlocking lives." Her idea for the novel came from the time she spent living on Dangar Island in the Hawkesbury River.

Castles incorporates the physical location not only as descriptive content in her novels, but to set the emotional tone of scenes, create tension and move the plot along. The river separates the characters in the River Baptists by flowing between them, and it forces them to meet when they use the ferry or need to travel across the river to the township. It gives the illusion of independence to the characters by separating them the community, but it also isolates when there are threats or danger.

The story is set in a small town and it is clear that there are few secrets kept from the locals: the interest of the locals is not only curiosity, but because they are looking out for each other. For the newcomers to the town this help is often unexpected. While the river is a strong and constant force that moves purposefully though the novel, in contract the main characters seem to be aimlessly drifting through life or escaping from their pasts and surviving day to day. It is only when they are forced to act, or when in a crisis they need make a decision, that they seem to wake up and take charge of their lives.

== Awards ==
- 2006 - winner of the Australian The Australian/Vogel Literary Award for The River Baptists
- 2013 - winner of the Asher Award for Hannah and Emil
- 2019 - long listed in Stella Prize for Bluebottle

== Works ==
- Falling Woman (Sceptre, 2000)
- The River Baptists (Allen & Unwin, 2007)
- Hannah and Emil (2012)
- Bluebottle (2018)
