= Kathryn Fox =

Australian writer and medical practitioner

- Born: Sydney, Australia
- Occupations: Author, screenwriter, former medical practitioner, podcast host
- Known for: Malicious Intent
- Website: kathrynfox.com

Kathryn Fox (born 1966) is an Australian author, screenwriter, public speaker, podcast host and former medical practitioner. She is one of Australia's most popular authors. Her Anya Crichton series of crime novels has received multiple awards, nominations and is internationally acclaimed. In 2015, she followed up with Private Sydney (titled "Missing" in the USA) a thriller co-written with the world's best-selling author, James Patterson. She hosts the true-crime podcast, Crime Insiders Forensics, produced by LiSTNR.

== Life and work ==
Fox became a Fellow of the Royal Australian College of General Practitioners, with a special interest in forensic medicine. After 12 years, she ceased medical practice to concentrate on writing.

Her crime novels feature forensic physician, Anya Crichton, as the main protagonist and have been praised by luminaries including Lee Child, Jeffery Deaver, James Patterson, Kathy Reichs, among others.

In 2023, Fox began hosting the LiSTNR podcast, Crime Insiders, alongside Brent Sanders, where she interviews forensic experts about complex and high-profile crimes. Previous guests include Paola Magni, Roger Byard, Jodie Ward, Max Houck and Gail Anderson.

Fox lives in Sydney and is currently writing, producing and developing a number of projects for film and television. Her Anya Crichton series of books is being adapted for television, titled 'CRICHTON'.

== Novels ==
- Malicious Intent (2004)
- Without Consent (2006)
- Skin and Bone (2007)
- Blood Born (2009)
- Death Mask (2010)
- Cold Grave (2012)
- Fatal Impact (2014)
- Private Sydney (2015), co-written with James Patterson

== Awards ==
- 2005 shortlisted Ned Kelly Awards for Crime Writing — Best First Novel - Malicious Intent
- 2005 winner Davitt Awards for Crime Writing — Best Adult Novel - Malicious Intent
- 2010 shortlisted Davitt Awards — Best Adult Crime Novel - Blood Born
- 2013 shortlisted Davitt Awards — Best Adult Crime Novel - Cold Grave
- 2014 shortlisted Ned Kelly Awards for Crime Writing — Best Novel - Fatal Impact

== Interviews ==
- The Age 9 February 2008
- Booktopia 1 November 2010
- First Tuesday Book Club
