= Tuvalu (band) =

Finnish band

- Origin: Finland
- Genres: Indie rock
- Years active: 2003 – Present
- Labels: Backstage Alliance
- Members: Annina Antinranta -Vocals; Antti Harmainen - Guitar; Jussi Oskari - Bass; Jussi Matikainen - Drums
- Website: http://www.tuvalu.ws/

Tuvalu is a Finnish band, founded in 2003 in Tampere-Helsinki-axis. They gained recognition with their debut EP Mitä muut ajattelevat sinusta? (lit. 'What do others think of you?') in 2004. The band was named after Veit Helmer's movie and the island nation with the same name.

The second album Pimeä saartaa meitä! ('Darkness surrounds us!') was released in 2006. Rumba called the album "a stylish debut" but criticised the lyrics. Aamulehti gave the album 4/5 stars.

In 2008 the album Viimeiset hetket ovat käsillä! ('Final moments are upon us!') was released.

The band has stated that Tuvalu's music will not be played on the radio, in protest against the Finnish music business.

== Discography ==
- 2004: Mitä muut ajattelevat sinusta? [EP]
- 2006: Pimeä saartaa meitä!
- 2008: Viimeiset hetket ovat käsillä!
- 2010: Tuvalu
