= Tuvalu (novel) =

Australian novel by Andrew O'Connor

- First edition
- Author: Andrew O'Connor
- Language: English
- Genre: Novel
- Publisher: Allen and Unwin, Australia
- Publication date: 2006
- Publication place: Australia
- Media type: Print Paperback
- Pages: 347 pp
- ISBN: 1-74114-871-5
- OCLC: 74946085
- Dewey Decimal: A823.4 22
- LC Class: PR9619.4.O286 T88 2006

Tuvalu is a 2006 novel by Australian author Andrew O'Connor. It won The Australian/Vogel Literary Award for unpublished manuscripts by writers under 35.

== Plot introduction ==
The novel is set mostly in Tokyo and tells the story of a young Australian teacher of English, and his relationship with two women, Tilly, another Australian English teacher, and Mami, a Japanese hotel heiress. It is told in first-person.

== Explanation of the novel's title ==
Tuvalu is a small Pacific island nation. It doesn't appear in the novel except as an idea. Tilly describes it to Noah as follows:

I guess for me Tuvalu's always done the trick. I've never been anywhere near it. I've never even studied it. For all I know it might well have sunk. But that one word's taken on a meaning all of its own. [...] Haven't you ever once looked into the future and pictured a different life for yourself, made it a destination in some abstract way? A place in which you are content and from which you never look forward, except maybe to hope for more of the same?

== Awards ==
- 2007: Commonwealth Writers' Prize SE Asia and South Pacific, Best First Novel: Winner
- 2005: The Australian/Vogel Literary Award: Winner

== Reviews ==
- Delaney, Brigid (January 20, 2005). "The loneliness of the long-distance writer pays off". The Sydney Morning Herald.
- Dooley, Gillian (2006) Review of 'Tuvalu' by Andrew O'Connor, recorded for Writers Radio, Radio Adelaide, 6 October 2006
