= The Australian/Vogel Literary Award =

Former literary award

The Australian/Vogel Literary Award was an Australian literary award for unpublished manuscripts by writers under the age of 35. The prize money AUD$20,000, was the richest and most prestigious award for an unpublished manuscript in Australia. Allen & Unwin guaranteed to publish the winning work.

== History ==
The award had been initiated in 1979 by Niels Stevns and was a collaboration between The Australian newspaper, the publisher Allen & Unwin, and Stevns & Company Pty Ltd. Stevns, founder of the company which made Vogel bread, named the award in honour of Swiss naturopath Alfred Vogel.

The Vogel was not awarded in 1985, 2013, and 2019.

The final award was presented in June 2024.

== The Australian Fiction Prize ==
The Vogel Prize was replaced by The Australian Fiction Prize by The Australian newspaper in partnership with publisher HarperCollins. The new prize is for an unpublished manuscript–excluding science fiction, young adult, poetry, plays, works for children–of between 75,000 and 100,000 words, and the prize continues at $20,000, plus a $15,000 advance from the publisher, HarperCollins, who will publish the work; there is now no age limit on the entrant, but the entrant must an Australian resident. Submissions in the prize's first year opened on 6 May 2024 and closed on 2 August 2024. The judges are Caroline Overington, literary editor of The Australian; book critic and literary agent Samuel Bernard; and bookseller Letitia Davy of Gleebooks.

== Vogel winners ==
- 1980 – Archie Weller, The Day of the Dog (Weller was initially runner-up to Paul Radley, who was disqualified after admitting that his manuscript was actually written by his uncle, who was also older than 35.
- 1981 – Chris Matthews, Al Jazzar and Tim Winton, An Open Swimmer
- 1982 – Brian Castro, Birds of Passage and Nigel Krauth, Matilda, My Darling
- 1983 – Jenny Summerville, Shields of Trell
- 1984 – Kate Grenville, Lilian's Story
- 1985 – No prize awarded
- 1986 – Robin Walton, Glace Fruits
- 1987 – Jim Sakkas, Ilias
- 1988 – Tom Flood, Oceana Fine
- 1989 – Mandy Sayer, Mood Indigo
- 1990 – Gillian Mears, The Mint Lawn and Michael Stephens, Sibling Mischief
- 1991 – Andrew McGahan, Praise
- 1992 – Fotini Epanomitis, The Mule's Foal
- 1993 – Helen Demidenko, The Hand That Signed the Paper
- 1994 – Darren Williams, Swimming in Silk
- 1995 – Richard King, Kindling Does For Firewood
- 1996 – Bernard Cohen, The Blindman's Hat
- 1997 – Eva Sallis, Hiam
- 1998 – Jennifer Kremmer, Pegasus in the Suburbs
- 1999 – Hsu-Ming Teo, Love and Vertigo
- 2000 – Stephen Gray, The Artist is a Thief
- 2001 – Sarah Hay, Skins
- 2002 – Danielle Wood, The Alphabet of Light and Dark
- 2003 – Nicholas Angel, Drown Them in the Sea and Ruth Balint, Troubled Waters
- 2004 – Julienne van Loon, Road Story
- 2005 – Andrew O'Connor, Tuvalu
- 2006 – Belinda Castles, The River Baptists
- 2007 – Stefan Laszczuk, I Dream of Magda
- 2008 – Andrew Croome, Document Z
- 2009 – Kristel Thornell, Night Street and Lisa Lang, Utopian Man
- 2010 – not awarded – Allen & Unwin Publishers decided to change the announcement of the winner to coincide with the publication of the book.
- 2011 – Rohan Wilson, The Roving Party
- 2012 – Paul D. Carter, Eleven Seasons
- 2013 – No prize awarded
- 2014 – Christine Piper, After Darkness
- 2015 – Murray Middleton, When There's Nowhere Else to Run
- 2016 – Katherine Brabon, The Memory Artist
- 2017 – Marija Peričić, The Lost Pages
- 2018 – Emily O'Grady, The Yellow House
- 2019 – No prize awarded
- 2020 – K. M. Kruimink, A Treacherous Country
- 2021 – Emma Batchelor, Now That I See You
- 2022 – Nell Pierce, A Place Near Eden
- 2023 – Anna McGahan, Immaculate
- 2024 – Kristina Ross, First Year
