= Sonya Hartnett =

Australian writer (born 1968)

- Born: March 23, 1968 (age 58); Melbourne, Australia
- Education: RMIT University (1988, BA)
- Occupation: Writer
- Writing career
- Pen name: Cameron S. Redfern
- Language: English
- Period: 1984–present
- Genres: Novels, especially young adult fiction; children's picture books
- Notable awards: Kathleen Mitchell Award (1996); Aurealis Award for Best Young Adult Novel (2000); Guardian Children's Fiction Prize (2002); The Age Book of the Year Award (2003); Astrid Lindgren Award (2008)

Sonya Louise Hartnett (born 23 March 1968) is an Australian author of fiction for adults, young adults, and children. She has been called "the finest Australian writer of her generation". For her career contribution to "children's and young adult literature in the broadest sense" Hartnett won the Astrid Lindgren Memorial Award from the Swedish Arts Council in 2008, one of the largest cash prizes in children's literature.

She has published books as Sonya Hartnett, S. L. Hartnett, and Cameron S. Redfern.

== Personal life and education ==
Hartnett was born 23 March 1968, in Melbourne, Australia to Philip Joseph and Virginia Mary Hartnett. In 1988, she received a Bachelor of Arts from the Royal Melbourne Institute of Technology.

== Career ==
Hartnett was thirteen years old when she wrote her first novel and fifteen when it was published for the adult market in Australia, Trouble All the Way (Adelaide: Rigby Publishers, 1984). For years she has written about one novel annually. Although she is often classified as a writer of young adult fiction, Hartnett does not consider this label entirely accurate: "I've been perceived as a young adult writer whereas my books have never really been young adult novels in the sort of classic sense of the idea." She believes the distinction is not so important in Britain as in her native land.

Many of Hartnett's books have been published in the UK and in North America. For Thursday's Child (2000; 2002 in the UK), she won the annual Guardian Children's Fiction Prize, a once-in-a-lifetime book award judged by a panel of British children's writers. The novel was eligible for such award in 2002 because it was her first publication in the UK. In 2008 she won the Astrid Lindgren Memorial Award which is administered by the Swedish Arts Council.

== Landscape with Animals controversy ==
In 2006, Hartnett was involved with some controversy regarding the publication of Landscape with Animals, published under the pseudonym Cameron S. Redfern. The book contains many sex scenes and Hartnett was almost immediately "outed" as the author. She said that she wanted to avoid the book being accidentally shelved with her work for children in libraries and denied that she used a pseudonym to evade responsibility for the work or as a publicity stunt à la Nikki Gemmell's The Bride Stripped Bare. In a review published in The Age, Peter Craven savaged the book describing it as an "overblown little sex shocker", a "tawdry little crotch tickler" and lamented that Hartnett was "too good a writer to put her name to this indigestible hairball of spunk and spite". It was defended vigorously in The Australian by Marion Halligan ("I haven't read many books by Hartnett, but I think this is a much more amazing piece of writing than any of them") who chastised Craven for missing the joke ("How could an experienced critic get that so wrong?") and wonders why female authors writing frankly about sex is so frowned upon.

== Awards and honours ==
In 2000 and 2003, The Sydney Morning Herald named Hartnett one of their Young Novelists of the Year.

In 2008, Hartnett received the Astrid Lindgren Memorial Award, which annually honours an author of children's books whose "a body of work known for its unflinching focus on the toughest aspects of life."

In 2016, Shelf Awareness included Golden Boys on their list of the best teen novels of the year.

Awards for Hartnett's writing
Year	Title	Award	Result	Ref.
1996	Sleeping Dogs	CBCA Children's Book of the Year Award: Older Readers	Honour	
1996	Sleeping Dogs	Kathleen Mitchell Award (Australia)	Winner	
1996	Sleeping Dogs	New South Wales Premier's Literary Awards	Shortlist	
1996	Sleeping Dogs	Victorian Premier's Literary Awards Sheaffer Pen Prize	Winner	
1996	Willful Blue	IBBY Ena Noel Award (1996)	Winner	
1999	Princes	CBCA Children's Book of the Year Award: Older Readers	Shortlist	
2000	Thursday's Child	Aurealis Award for Best Young Adult Novel	Winner	
2000	Thursday's Child	Australian Publishers Association Award	Shortlist	
2001	Thursday's Child	CBCA Children's Book of the Year Award: Older Readers	Shortlist	
2001	Thursday's Child	New South Wales Premier's Literary Awards	Shortlist	
2002	Forest	CBCA Children's Book of the Year Award: Older Readers	Winner	
2002	Stripes of the Sidestep Wolf	CBCA Children's Book of the Year Award: Older Readers	Shortlist	
2002	Thursday's Child	Guardian Children's Fiction Prize	Winner	
2002	Thursday's Child	Mail on Sunday/John Llewellyn Rhys Prize	Shortlist	
2003	Of a Boy	The Age Book of the Year Award	Winner	
2003	Of a Boy	Commonwealth Writers Prize (South East Asia and South Pacific Region, Best Book)	Finalist	
2003	Of a Boy	Miles Franklin Award	Shortlist	
2003	Of a Boy	New South Wales Premier's Literary Awards	Shortlist	
2005	The Silver Donkey	Courier Mail Award for young readers	Winner	
2005	The Silver Donkey	CBCA Children's Book of the Year Award: Younger Readers	Winner	
2005	Surrender	The Age Book of the Year Award	Shortlist	
2005	Surrender	Aurealis Award for Best Fantasy Novel	Shortlist	
2006	Surrender	Commonwealth Writers Prize (South East Asia and South Pacific Region, Best Book)	Shortlist	
2007	The Silver Donkey	COOL Award Fiction for Years 7-9	Winner	
2007	Surrender	Michael L. Printz Award	Honour	
2008	The Ghost's Child	CBCA Children's Book of the Year Award: Older Readers	Winner	
2010	Butterfly	Miles Franklin Award	Shortlist	
2010	The Midnight Zoo	Aurealis Award for Best Young Adult Novel	Finalist	
2010	The Silver Donkey	Andersen Award (Italy) Best Book for readers 9–12	Winner	
2011	The Midnight Zoo	CBCA Children's Book of the Year Award: Older Readers	Winner	
2012	Come Down, Cat!	CBCA Children's Book of the Year Award: Younger Readers	Honour	
2012	Come Down, Cat!	Prime Minister's Literary Awards for Children's Fiction	Finalist	
2012	The Midnight Zoo	CILIP Carnegie Medal	Shortlist	
2013	The Children of the King	CBCA Children's Book of the Year Award: Younger Readers	Winner	
2013	The Children of the King	Prime Minister's Literary Awards Young Adult Fiction	Shortlist	
2015	Golden Boys	Christine Stead Prize for Fiction	Shortlist	
2015	Golden Boys	Miles Franklin Award	Shortlist	
2015	Golden Boys	New South Wales Premier's Literary Awards	Shortlist	
2015	Golden Boys	Prime Minister's Literary Awards for Fiction	Finalist	
2015	Golden Boys	Victorian Premier's Literary Awards	Shortlist	
2022	Blue Flower	CBCA Children's Book of the Year Award: Picture Book	Shortlist	

== Bibliography ==
=== Fiction ===
==== Picture books ====
- The Boy and the Toy (2010)
- Come Down, Cat! (2011)
- Blue Flower (2021)
- Go Home, Cat! (2022)

==== Junior fiction ====
- The Silver Donkey (2004)
- Sadie and Ratz (2008)
- The Children of the King (2012)

==== Teen and young adult fiction ====
- Wilful Blue (1994)
  - produced as a play and performed at the Victorian Arts Centre
- Sleeping Dogs (1995)
- The Devil Latch (1996)
- Princes (1997)
- All My Dangerous Friends (1998)
- Stripes of the Sidestep Wolf (1999) (published in the UK in 2004)
- Thursday's Child (2000) (published in the UK in 2002)
- Forest (2001)
- Surrender (2005)
- The Ghost's Child (2007)
- Butterfly (2009)
- The Midnight Zoo (2010)

==== Adult fiction ====
- Trouble All the Way (1984)
- Sparkle and Nightflower (1986)
- The Glass House (1990)
- Black Foxes (1996)
- Earls, Nick; Sonya Hartnett; Heide Seaman (1998). There must be lions : stories about mental illness. Charnwood, A.C.T.: Ginninderra Press.
- Of a Boy (adult, 2002) (first published in the UK as What the Birds See in 2003)
- Landscape with Animals (2006), as by Cameron S. Redfern
- Golden Boys (2014)

=== Memoirs ===
- Life in Ten Houses: A Memoir (2013)

== Selected critical studies and reviews of Hartnett's work ==
- Case, Jo (September 2014). "Bearing witness". Australian Book Review. 364: 13. Review of Golden Boys
