= Leigh Redhead =

Australian writer

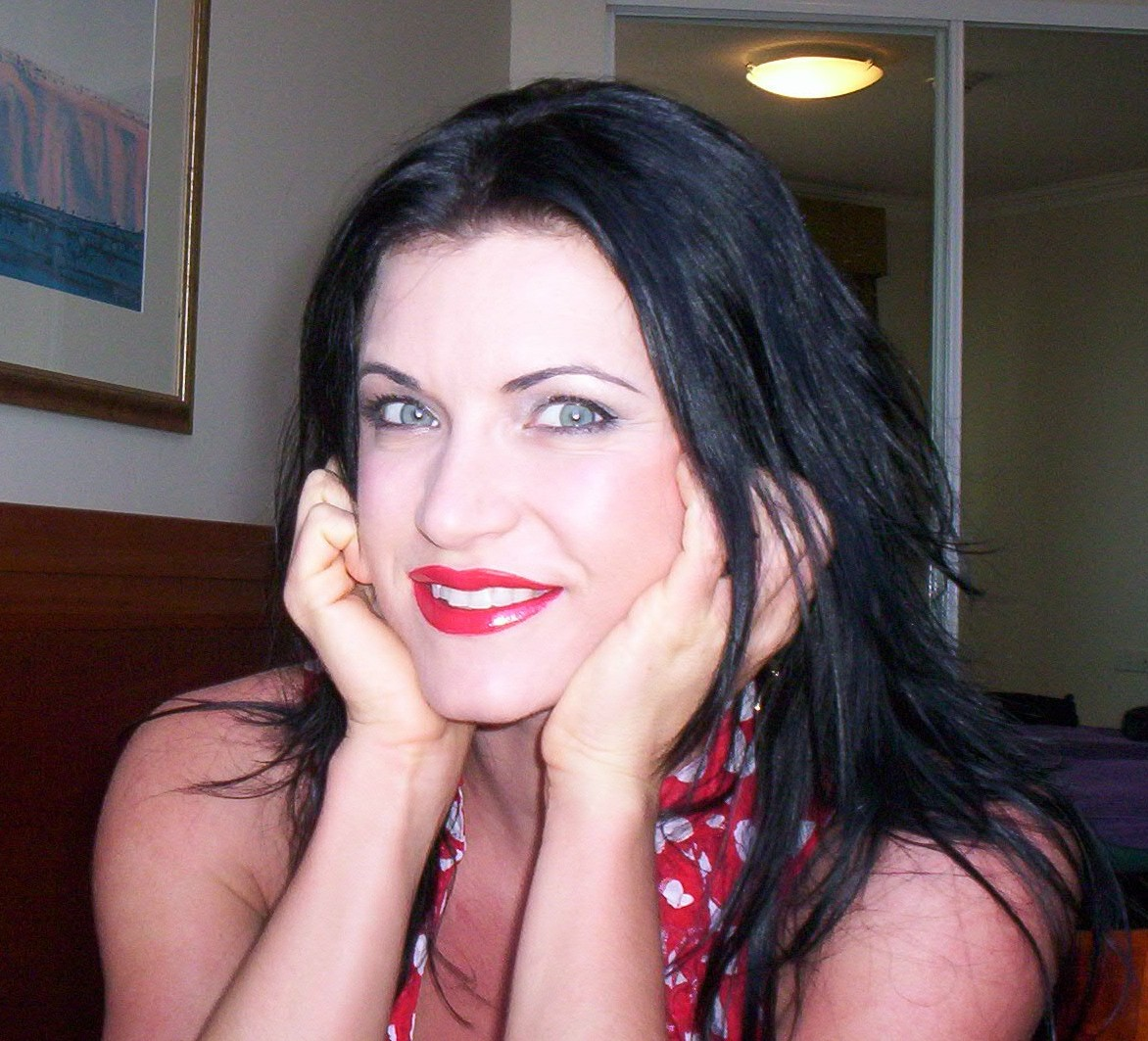
- Born: 18 November 1971 (age 54); Adelaide, South Australia, Australia
- Occupation: Novelist
- Writing career
- Period: 2004 – present
- Genres: Suspense, detective
- Website: www.leighredhead.com

Leigh Redhead (born 18 November 1971, in Adelaide, South Australia) is an Australian mystery writer.

She is best known as the creator of the character Simone Kirsch, a stripper who leaves the sex industry to become a private investigator. Redhead drew upon her own experiences as a stripper in creating the character.

== Awards ==
- The Sydney Morning Herald Best Young Australian Novelists 2005 – for Peepshow
- The Sydney Morning Herald Best Young Australian Novelists 2006 – for Rubdown
- Davitt Award 2005 – Readers' Choice for Peepshow
- Davitt Award 2006 – Readers' Choice for Rubdown
- Davitt Award 2008 – Highly Commended for Cherry Pie

== Works ==
- Peepshow (2004)
- Rubdown (2005)
- Cherry Pie (2007)
- Thrill City (2010)
