= Does My Head Look Big in This? =

2005 book by Randa Abdel-Fattah

Does My Head Look Big In This?
- Author: Randa Abdel-Fattah
- Language: English
- Genre: Young Adult Fiction
- Publisher: Pac Macmillan (Australia)
- Publication date: 1 August 2005
- Publication place: Australia
- Media type: Paperback
- Pages: 348
- Awards: ABIA
- ISBN: 0-439-91947-9
- OCLC: 74648918
- LC Class: PZ7.A15892 Doe 2007

Does My Head Look Big In This? is author Randa Abdel-Fattah's first novel. It was released in Australia, by Pan MacMillan Australia, on 1 August 2005. It won the Australian Book Industry Award and Australian Book of The Year Award for older children.

The story revolves around (and is told from the view point of) a sixteen-year-old Muslim girl who decides to wear the hijab, a religious veil, full-time. Her decision leads to different reactions from her friends, family, and peers.

This novel was adapted as a full-length play, and is available from the Dramatic Publishing Company.

== Plot ==
This novel tells the story of the life of a Muslim teenage girl of Palestinian descent in Australia (Amal Mohamed Nasrullah Abdel-Hakim). Her father is a doctor and her mother is a dentist. She is a grade 12 student at McCleans Grammar School, a prestigious school in Australia whose culture has been closely guarded for generations. A few days before the end of the second semester holiday, she decided to cover her private parts, namely her hair, with a hijab. She wants to wear the hijab full time, including while at school. She felt anxious and afraid, but she still had the courage to carry out his decision. Her religious but open-minded parents strongly supported her decision to wear the hijab, but were worried about the reactions and pressure from other people and her environment. However, because the parents understand that their child's intention to wear the hijab is because of religious instructions and without coercion, they support it.

Right on the first day of school for semester 3. She really carried out her decision to wear the hijab full time, including at school. First she had to face her principal and explain the big decision she had taken. She thought Ms. Walsh, the principal, would scold her for breaking the discipline that had been maintained at her school. Next, she will face various reactions from her friends in class and in the school environment. After her parents were asked to come to school, she was finally allowed to wear a headscarf at school, and became the only student who wore a headscarf at McCleans.

At the end of this novel, Amal gets encouragement from herself that she is a Muslim.

“I am a multicolored adjective. "Stories, confrontations, pain and happiness, they are the ones who have strengthened me to know myself, challenging me to accept my identity as a young Australian-Palestinian-Muslim girl" (p.348)
