= Andrew O'Connor (writer) =

Australian novelist

- Born: 1978 (age 47–48); Warragul, Victoria
- Occupation: Novelist
- Writing career
- Language: English
- Years active: 2005-
- Notable work: Tuvalu
- Notable awards: 2005 The Australian/Vogel Literary Award

Andrew O'Connor (born 1978) is an Australian novelist.

== Life ==
Born in Warragul, Victoria, he studied arts at the University of Melbourne before travelling and working in central and northern Australia. Following this, he lived and worked in Tokyo and Nagano, Japan. He presently lives in Warragul, Australia.

== Awards and nominations ==
- 2005 — The Australian/Vogel Literary Award for Tuvalu
- 2007 — Commonwealth Writers' Prize (South East Asia and South Pacific Region, Best First Book) for Tuvalu
- 2008 — Longlisted in the International Dublin Literary Award for Tuvalu

== Bibliography ==
- Tuvalu (2006)
