= Mardi McConnochie =

Australian author and playwright (born 1971)

- Born: 1971 (age 54–55); Armidale, New South Wales, Australia
- Education: University of Sydney
- Occupations: Author; Playwright; Screenwriter
- Partner: James Bradley
- Writing career
- Genres: Literary fiction; Children's literature
- Notable works: Coldwater; The Snow Queen; Fivestar; Melissa, Queen of Evil

Mardi McConnochie (born 1971) is an Australian author and playwright.

She is the author of four novels, Coldwater (2001), The Snow Queen (2003), Fivestar (2005) and The Voyagers (2011), and five books for children. These are Melissa, Queen of Evil (2006) and the sequel Dangerous Games (2007), and the Quest of the Sunfish trilogy, Escape to the Moon Islands (2016), The Castle in the Sea (2017) and The Skeleton Coast (2017).

McConnochie's novels have grappled with questions about celebrity and the possibilities open to women and women artists.

As well as novels, McConnochie has written for the stage and for television. Her television credits include Home and Away, Always Greener, McLeod's Daughters and Pacific Drive.

McConnochie lives in Sydney with her partner, the novelist, James Bradley.

== Life and work ==
McConnochie was born in Armidale, New South Wales and raised in Adelaide, South Australia. She has a PhD in English Literature from the University of Sydney.

McConnochie's novels have grappled with questions about celebrity and the possibilities open to women and women artists. The first, Coldwater, transplants the Brontë sisters to a penal colony off the coast of New South Wales, using their plight to explore different approaches to art, life and love. It was shortlisted in the "Best First Book (SE Asia and Pacific Region)" category for the Commonwealth Writers Prize, and was named by The Washington Post as one of the Books of the Year.

Her second novel, The Snow Queen is set in Adelaide and tells the story of a former Russian ballerina stranded in post-war Australia. It saw McConnochie voted one of the Best Young Australian Novelists by The Sydney Morning Herald in 2004.

Her third novel, Fivestar focuses on contemporary notions of celebrity, charting the rise and fall of an antipodean girl group reminiscent of The Spice Girls.

Melissa, Queen of Evil, her first novel for children, won the 2006 Aurealis Award for Best Children's Novel.

The Flooded Earth (Also known as "Quest of the Sunfish") won the Best Children's Fiction prize at the US 2019 Green Earth Book Awards.

== Novels ==
- Coldwater (2001)
- The Snow Queen (2003)
- Fivestar (2005)
- The Voyagers (2011)
- Quest of the Sunfish: Escape to the Moon Islands (2016)
- Quest of the Sunfish: The Castle in the Sea (2017)
- Quest of the Sunfish: The Skeleton Coast (2017)
