= Thursday's Child (Hartnett novel) =

2000 novel by Sonya Hartnett

- Front cover of first edition
- Author: Sonya Hartnett
- Language: English
- Genre: Realist young-adult novel
- Publisher: Penguin Books
- Publication date: 31 August 2000
- Publication place: Australia
- Media type: Print (paperback)
- Pages: 223 pp (first edition)
- ISBN: 978-0-14-029732-4
- OCLC: 248050261
- LC Class: PZ7.H267387 Th 2000

Thursday's Child is young adult novel by the Australian writer Sonya Hartnett, published in 2000 by Penguin Books. Set during the 1930s Great Depression in Australia, it features a young woman Harper Flute and her family, who live in poverty. It won the annual Aurealis Award for best young-adult novel.

Following its publication by Walker Books in the U.K., Hartnett won the 2002 Guardian Children's Fiction Prize, a once-in-a-lifetime book award judged by a panel of British children's writers.

== Plot summary ==
Harper Flute is an adolescent girl living with her family in Australia during the depression. Harper Flute's little brother Tin was born on Thursday and he has far to go.

Harper starts out by saying how she and Tin go out to the creek, and start watching fish. Harper soon catches one out of the creek, and she tries to search for Tin to let him see it. She notices that he's gone and starts crying out to her house. Her dad, whom she calls Da, comes out and starts searching all over for Tin, and they eventually find him in the mud. Harper notices that he dug his way out, but she won't tell anyone about this special event. Back at the house, Audrey, her older sister, scolds Harper for letting him get away like that. Mrs. Murphy, the neighbor, starts worrying about Tin and starts talking about the new baby.

Later on in the book, her mother, whom she calls Mam, is pregnant and gives birth to a new baby boy named Caffy. Tin is considered Da's "little pet", and Harper notes how she, her older brother, Devon, and Audrey aren't pets, but they aren't nothing. She remarks how Caffy is nothing to Da though.

Harper notices how Tin loves to dig and he spends most of his time under the house. She sees how he's digging tunnels, and spends most of his year there. Mam is worried and distressed about Tin because her neighbors are asking why he doesn't come out, and how he needs to, and Da supports Tin because it reminds him of the war and how they dug tunnels. People at school come to see Tin's tunnels.

Mr. Cable, a "friend", comes over and notes how they need a farm. Da fights back, but Mr. Cable asks Devon if he can work for him for a week's wages. Devon agrees, and decides to travel the next day so he can get there sooner. Harper notes how much she misses Devon, and guesses that Caffy misses Tin, but Mam and Da argue that Caffy doesn't know Tin and he can't miss what he never had. Devon comes home a week later, and starts crying. He notes how Mr. Cable sent him home without a penny and an hour's instruction to build the fences. His dream to own a pony named Champion was ruined and he ignores everyone for a whole week. Da tries to talk to Mr. Cable, but he notes how Devon made two of his sows run away with his "lousy" fences. Da apologizes and goes back, saying "Mr. Cable has no heart, you can't talk him out of it."

Soon, Da's father dies and in his will, Grandpa gives the money to Devon. Devon wants to buy a pony and he rubs it in Audrey's face. Audrey gets very upset and asks him not to. Devon decides to buy what they need, not what he wants. He is willing to sacrifice his dream pony, but Da suggests not, and decides to buy the pony. Devon is not very optimistic about this, so when they come home, Mam starts arguing how Harper never got new clothes in her life. Devon screams out, "I told you so!" and Mam slams the door and starts crying. Da says she'll get over it. One day, a seventeen-year-old boy named Izzy moves to their town, and Audrey begins to have a crush on him. Audrey tells Harper she's going to marry Izzy one day, but Harper wonders what it feels like to get married.

One day going to school, their house collapses. Da had wanted to start a farm, just like Mr. Cable wanted them to. Harper runs back, and tries to find Tin, while Audrey and Devon try to find their parents. Da screams out in rage how this is all Tin's fault. Mam argues that it's not his fault, they'll just rebuilt it. Da is so upset that he's biting his fingernails and digging them into his skin. Harper is so upset to see Da like this, so she tries to stop him from doing that, but he slaps her. Mam gets very upset and cries out, "Don't you dare slap this child! Get to your feet, you disgust me. How dare you take your misery out on a poor infant." Harper doesn't care, she wants her Da to stop digging in his skin. Mam tells Da to build the house while she finds a place to stay for the while.

Mr. Cable comes back, complaining about how Tin keeps eating all the honey of his beehive. He complains and Da apologizes, and sees Tin wounded. Mam goes and gets clean rags to clean the wounds off. After that, Tin leaves the rags on the dirt and runs away. Mam sighs and wants Tin to talk to her, to be part of her family. When Mam finds the rags outside, she folds them neatly and puts them in a box. She keeps Tin's things in there. She put a lock of hair inside and what she can find from Tin.

One day, Caffy falls into a well, and they try to save him, but he sadly dies. Audrey is sent to work for labor and Harper is very upset with the death. Da soon rebuilds the house, but Harper feels that Tin is growing farther away from the family. He keeps on digging and digging, and won't talk to anyone, not even Mam. Harper is worried, but she doesn't talk about it.

What's even worse is that their chickens and cows were stolen by some salesmen. Mr. Cable had offered Audrey to work for him as a housekeeper. She said no, then the next morning their chickens and cows were stolen. Audrey asks Harper if she's sick of eating rabbit, and Harper says yes, but she doesn't mind. Audrey doesn't want to see her family suffer so she decides to tell yes to Mr. Cable to be his housekeeper. Harper follows Audrey when she leaves, and Audrey goes to Izzy. She tells Izzy that she has decided to work for Mr. Cable, but Izzy tells her that people have been saying that Mr. Cable paid the salesmen to take the animals away so that Audrey would say yes. Audrey doesn't believe him at first, but then she does, and she decides to tell Mam and everyone that she is leaving. That is the last that Harper sees Audrey this month.

Audrey comes home one day from Mr. Cable's, and bursts out crying. She tells her mother, that she had been raped by Mr.Cable and had run back home. Da, who is so upset, takes his rifle and charges to Mr. Cable's house. Mam begs Harper to chase after him and bring him back. Harper tries, but Da argues that she should go home and walks away, looking for Mr. Cable. Harper suddenly falls into one of Tin's tunnels, and she starts thinking of Caffy while crawling. Suddenly, she starts saying "sorry" and Tin helps her out. Harper thanks him, and finds her Da. They go on home.

The next few months, Mr. Murphy tells Da that people said that Mr. Cable ran away after hearing that Da was going to defend Audrey, and that he was the most admired man in the town now. It is also strongly hinted that Mr Cable was killed by Tin. The family then parade around the small town to soak in the fame. A few days later, the Flute family is given a chunk of gold that Tin finds in one of his tunnels. They dance around, happy, and thinking that Tin was digging to find something to help his poor family all along. However, Harper still thinks that Tin dug because he loved to do so.

Harper and Audrey move to a new house near the beach, and Mam and Da moved to find more gold. Harper proclaims that Da got bit by the mining bug. She says she misses Devon, who moved to the front, and Izzy, Audrey's sweetheart, who went to war. She misses Caffy, she misses her past, and she misses her Mam and Da. She says she misses Tin.

"It was Tin, who was mythical, and he looked just that way. He looked nothing like the boy he was supposed to be, ten going on eleven. He seemed to hover above the earth somehow, the curious glow of his flesh illuminating him. I would not have been surprised if wings had opened up behind him…… he looked into the room at us. He looked first at Mam, then Da, then at Audrey, then me. When his eyes settled on mine I felt something inside me shake free, and go to him. I didn’t give it—he wanted it, and it went to him. Then he smiled, only slightly, but enough so we agreed, afterward, that we had seen it done. With that he turned and vanished…" -Quote from the book, Thursday's Child.
