= Of a Boy =

2002 novel by Sonya Hartnett

- First edition
- Author: Sonya Hartnett
- Language: English
- Genre: Young adult fiction
- Publisher: Viking (Australia)
- Publication date: 2002
- Publication place: Australia
- Media type: Paperback, Hardback

Of a Boy (What The Birds See in the UK and US) is a 2002 novel by Sonya Hartnett about a lonely and troubled youth.

== Plot ==
The omnipresent narrator follows the plight of nine-year-old Adrian in his suburban life in 1977. At age eight, his parents separated and he was taken away from his Mother Sookie as she was "unfit to care for him". He therefore lives with his Grandmother Beattie and Uncle Rory. Adrian spends his days thinking of things that unsettle him such as sea monsters and growing purple hair. One of the things that most disturb him is the fact that three children, surnamed Metford, disappear from a neighborhood near his around the beginning of the book.

Shortly after the disappearance of the Metford children, a twelve-year-old girl called Nicole moves in across the street from Adrian. She has no friends and doesn't attend school, but she mystifies Adrian and he soon becomes obsessed with her as he loses his only friend Clinton. The novel ends tragically with Adrian and Nicole falling beneath a pool cover (while trying to find the abducted children) in winter and being unable to break through to the air. The story ends with Adrian's grandmother believing him to be abducted, just as the Metford children.

== Reception ==
Kirkus Reviews referred to What the Birds See as a "bleakly haunting novel [that] focuses its lens on a child struggling to survive in a family of emotional cripples", further describing the narrative as "exquisite, wrenching, [and] unforgettable".

In a starred review, Publishers Weekly praised Hartnett for her ability to "[capture] the ineffable fragility of childhood", and highlighted how "the measured distance Hartnett puts between readers and Adrian allows her to introduce a tragic climax that neither manipulates nor (likely) devastates the audience." Kirkus Reviews similarly discussed the writing style, indicating that Hartnett "has a genius for voice, her third-person narrative sliding effortlessly from Adrian’s point-of-view to his grandmother’s and back, always tightly filtering the story through the experiences and perceptions of her focus".

Kirkus concluded their review by writing, "There is no great cataclysmic ending, no blinding revelation here, however—just a series of small, child-sized cataclysms, ignored by those who should love Adrian and drowned out by media ravings over the lost children."

Booklist also reviewed the novel.

== Accolades ==
Awards for Of a Boy
Year	Award	Result	Ref.
2003	The Age Book of the Year Awards	Winner	
2003	Commonwealth Writers Prize (South East Asia and South Pacific Region, Best Book)	Winner	
2003	Miles Franklin Award	Shortlist	
2003	New South Wales Premier's Literary Awards	Shortlist	
