= Randa Abdel-Fattah =

Australian writer and academic (born 1979)

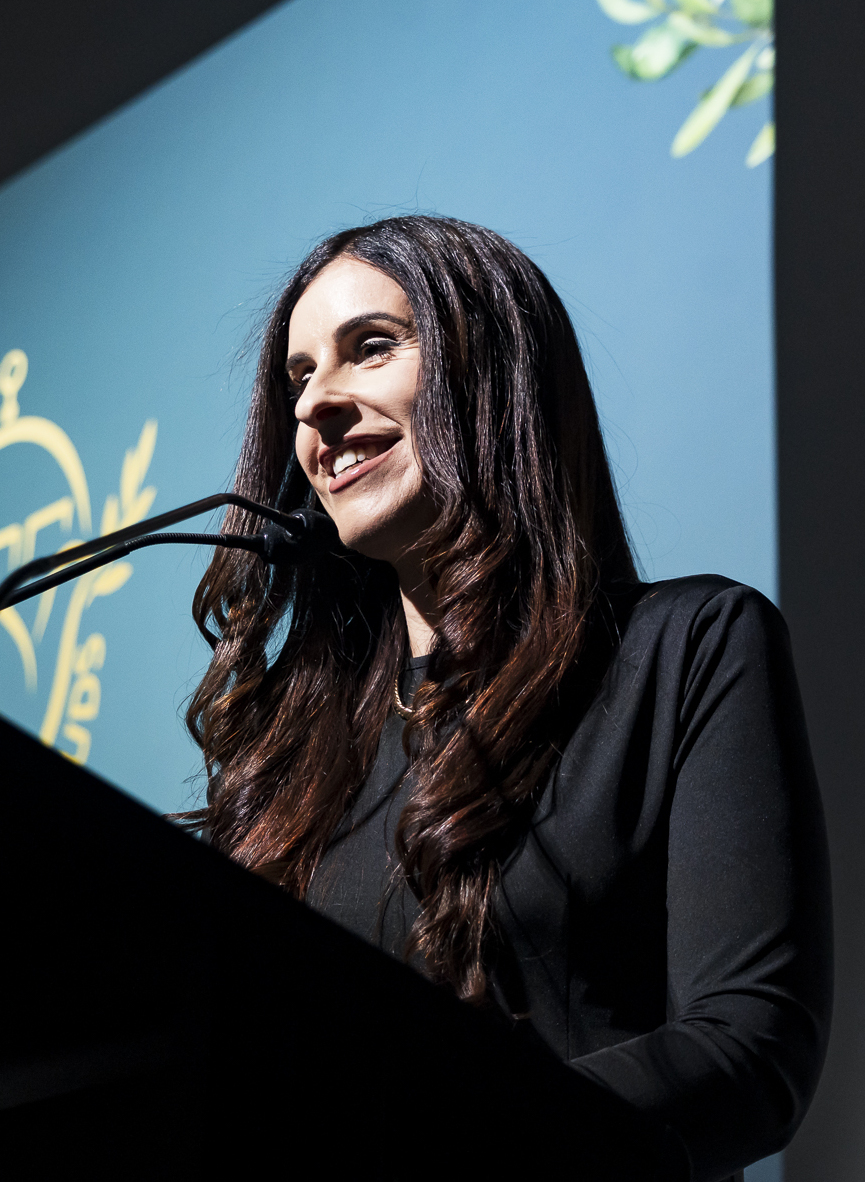
- Abdel-Fattah in 2026
- Born: 6 June 1979 (age 47); Sydney, New South Wales, Australia
- Citizenship: Australia
- Education: Melbourne University (B.A.); Macquarie University (Ph.D)
- Occupations: Writer, lawyer, academic
- Children: 4
- Writing career
- Genres: Fiction, school story, sociology
- Subjects: Islamophobia, Islam, Muslims
- Notable works: Does My Head Look Big in This? Discipline
- Notable awards: Kathleen Mitchell Award
- Website: randaabdelfattah.com

Randa Abdel-Fattah (Arabic: رندة عبد الفتاح; born 6 June 1979) is an Australian sociologist, lawyer and writer. She is an advocate for human rights, particularly for Palestinian people. Much of her work focuses on identity and what it means to be Muslim in Australia. Her debut novel, Does My Head Look Big in This?, was published in 2005. Her 2025 novel, Discipline, came to public attention after Abdel-Fattah was disinvited from the 2026 Adelaide Writers' Week, leading to a boycott by most of the scheduled participants and the subsequent cancellation of the event.

== Early life and education ==
Randa Abdel-Fattah was born on 6 June 1979 in Sydney, New South Wales, to a Palestinian father and an Egyptian mother. Although often referred to as Palestinian Australian, Abdel-Fattah has said "I don't think I ever identified as or even felt 'Palestinian in Australia' Sometimes I felt a hybrid of Australian and Palestinian. Sometimes I felt neither Australian nor Palestinian, tired of identity politics [...] As for my cultural consciousness, my mother is Egyptian and I grew up among her family in Australia and probably absorbed more Egyptian culture as a child." In an essay on Mondoweiss in January 2026, she described herself as a Palestinian.

She grew up in Melbourne, Victoria, and attended a Catholic primary school and then King Khalid Islamic College. She wrote her first novel, based on Roald Dahl's Matilda, when she was in sixth grade. She started writing the first draft of a semi-autobiographical novel at age 15, which was completed and published ten years later as Does My Head Look Big in This?

In 2002, Abdel-Fattah gained BA and LLB degrees from the University of Melbourne. During this time, she was the media liaison at the Islamic Council of Victoria, writing about Muslims in Australia.

In 2016, Abdel-Fattah obtained her PhD from the Department of Sociology at Macquarie University. Her thesis, "Islamophobia and Everyday Multiculturalism in Australia", was later published by Routledge in 2018.

== Career ==
=== Law ===
Abdel-Fattah worked as a solicitor for various firms, including Slater & Gordon (2001–2003), Lander & Rogers (2003–2006), Thompson Playford Lawyers (2006–2009) and Hicksons Lawyers (2009–2012).

As of September 2025, she is a lawyer of the Supreme Court of New South Wales. She is patron of the Racial Justice Centre, the first Australian Community Legal Service focused on racial justice.

=== Writing and research ===
In 2018, Abdel-Fattah received two research fundings from the Australian Research Council in the form of their Discovery Early Career Research Award, for studying the sociological conditions of modern Muslim and non-Muslim youth. Her three-year project was based at Macquarie University with Amanda Wise as her collaborator. Her findings were published by NewSouth Publishing in 2021 as Coming of Age in the War on Terror, and as a paper in the Journal of Sociology in 2024.

Abdel-Fattah has published research articles in the Journal of Sociology, the Sociological Research Online, and the Journal of Intercultural Studies.

She has written books for children and young adults. She created a series aimed at early readers, called Our Stories, of books written and illustrated by diverse authors and illustrators. Her research inspired another project for young children, leading to Australia's first Black-Palestinian picture book collaboration, 11 Words For Love (2023).

She has also published novels. Her latest novel Discipline was published in August 2025. Set in Sydney during the Israel-Gaza War, its main characters are a young journalist of Palestinian descent and an academic of Egyptian Australian descent.

She has written articles for The Sydney Morning Herald, The Age, The Guardian, Overland, Meanjin, Al Jazeera English, Le Monde, New Matilda, and The New Arab.

As of September 2025 Abdel-Fattah is a Future Fellow in the Department of Sociology at Macquarie University. Her research areas cover Islamophobia, race, Palestine, the war on terror, youth identities, and social movement activism.

== Views and media appearances ==
Abdel-Fattah describes herself as a feminist and has written critical pieces on women's rights in Saudi Arabia, stating that women should retain the right to wear what they want. She no longer discusses the hijab, on the basis that it constitutes flogging a dead horse and detracts from the discussion of other issues.

On Australian television, she has appeared on Insight (SBS), First Tuesday Book Club (ABC), Q&A (ABC TV), Sunrise (Seven Network), and 9am with David & Kim (Network 10).

In 2022, the Australian Research Council (ARC) granted Abdel-Fattah their Future Fellowship on a research project titled "Arab/Muslim Australian Social Movements since the 1970s: A hidden history". Abdel-Fattah is the primary chief investigator, contracted to work on the project from 2023 to 2027.

During the Gaza War starting in 2023, she has been a vocal critic of the Israeli government, accusing it of committing a "Palestinian holocaust" in Gaza. At an academic symposium organised by the Queensland University of Technology's Carumba Institute, Abdel-Fattah spoke of how, instead of organising an academic conference as mandated by her ARC grants, she used the funds to run a workshop for women from multicultural backgrounds. Because of the fund diversion remarks, the education minister, Jason Clare, wrote to the ARC board on 31 January 2025 asking it to investigate Abdel-Fattah. On 27 February, the ARC announced that the Abdel-Fattah's grant was suspended and that it was the responsibility of Macquarie University to resolve the issue and, if the grant had been misused, to refund the entire amount. After a 10-month investigation led by two independent academics, the university announced on 23 December 2025 that "there is no basis for any further investigation of the concerns raised by the ARC." The ARC restored the funding.

Abdel-Fattah's social media post from March 2024 which stated that Zionists "have no claim or right to cultural safety" was widely reported and used against her. In an essay on Mondoweiss in January 2026, she wrote of her "fight against Zionism" and restated that Zionists, as she understands the term, are not entitled to claim the right to a culturally safe space.

In the same essay Abdel-Fattah also defended changing her Facebook cover to a picture of a paraglider in the colours of the Palestinian flag on 8 October 2023, one day after the October 7 attacks. She wrote that, at the time, she was not aware that armed paragliders had landed at the music festival and shot at civilians. She wrote: "The last short-lived mass breakout was in January 2008 [...] Images of these items symbolise freedom 'and escape from imprisonment'" and "Palestinians in the diaspora were posting the image as an iconic symbol of an imprisoned, besieged population breaking free." Her profile picture remained unchanged for five months, which she attributed to the fact she does not regularly use Facebook. She wrote in January 2026 that "an image that represented a moment of freedom is not something I will apologise for".

In August 2025, Abdel-Fattah cancelled her scheduled presentation at the Bendigo Writers Festival in response to a code of conduct imposed by the festival two days before the festival was due to begin. Many other scheduled presenters also boycotted the festival in support of Abdel-Fattah and in protest at the code of conduct. She sued Bendigo City Council and La Trobe University in VCAT in July 2026, stating that she had suffered reputational damage and was discriminated against because of her political beliefs or activity.

=== 2026 Adelaide Writers' Week ===
On 8 January 2026, the Adelaide Festival board announced that Abdel-Fattah's scheduled appearance at Adelaide Writers' Week in February to March 2026 had been cancelled due to concerns over "cultural sensitivity" following the 2025 Bondi Beach shooting. There was a backlash from writers and the public to the decision, with most of the participants announcing a boycott of the event. Abdel-Fattah decried the move as censorship. Due to the controversy, Louise Adler, the director of Adelaide Writer's Week who had scheduled her appearance, resigned from her position, and Writers' Week was cancelled. The board resigned and a new board was appointed which apologised to Abdel-Fattah. The new board also invited her to the 2027 edition of the event.

=== Newcastle Writers' Festival 2026 ===
Abdel-Fattah appeared at Newcastle Writers' Festival in Newcastle, New South Wales, in March 2026, with two sessions sold out and a third added owing to demand, despite NSW Premier Chris Minns previously opining that her inclusion was "crazy".

== Awards and nominations ==
Abdel-Fattah was nominated for the Astrid Lindgren Memorial Award in 2018, 2019, and 2020.

Awards, nominations, and shortlistings for her works include:

Year	Nominated work	Award	Category	Result	Ref.
2008	Ten Things I Hate About Me	Kathleen Mitchell Award		Winner	
2009	Where the Streets Had a Name	Inky Awards	Gold	Winner	
2017	When Michael Met Mina	Victorian Premier's Literary Awards	Writing for Young Adults	Winner	
2017	When Michael Met Mina	Victorian Premier's Literary Awards	Highly Commended; People's Choice winner	Winner	
2022	Coming of Age in the War on Terror	Victorian Premier's Literary Awards	Nonfiction	Shortlisted	
2022	Coming of Age in the War on Terror	New South Wales Premier's Literary Awards	NSW Multicultural	Shortlisted	
2022	Coming of Age in the War on Terror	Stella Prize		Longlisted	
2023	11 Words for Love	Prime Minister's Literary Awards	Children's Fiction	Shortlisted	
2024	The Very Best Doughnut	Speech Pathology Australia Book of the Year Awards	Five to 8 Years	Shortlisted	
2026	Discipline	Victorian Premier's Literary Awards	People's Choice	Winner	
2026	Discipline	New South Wales Premier's Literary Awards	NSW Multicultural	Shortlisted	
2026	Discipline	Miles Franklin Award		Shortlisted	
2026	Discipline	ALS Gold Medal		Shortlisted	
2026	Discipline	Fiction Award, South Australian Literary Awards		Shortlisted	

== Other roles and activities ==
Abdel-Fattah is a human rights advocate and stood at the 1998 federal election as a member of the Unity Party (with the slogan "Say No to Pauline Hanson"). She has also been interested in interfaith dialogue and has been a member of various interfaith networks. She has volunteered time with human rights and migrant resource organisations, including the Australian Arabic Council, the Victorian Migrant Resource Centre, the Islamic Women's Welfare Council, and the Asylum Seeker Resource Centre. Abdel-Fattah has also been a member of the Palestinian Human Rights Committee and the New South Wales Young Lawyers for Human Rights Committee.

== Personal life ==
As of 2022 Abdel-Fattah was living in Sydney with her husband and four children.

She is an observant Muslim.

== Works ==
- Does My Head Look Big in This? (2005)
- Ten Things I Hate About Me (2006)
- Where the Streets Had a Name (2008)
- Noah's Law (2010)
- The Friendship Matchmaker (2011)
- The Friendship Matchmaker Goes Undercover (2012)
- No Sex in the City (2012)
- The Lines We Cross (2016)
- When Mina Met Michael (2016)
- "Australian Muslim Voices on Islamophobia, Race and the 'War on Terror'" (Bibliography, Meanjin Quarterly, 9 April 2019)
- Arab Australian Other: Stories on Race and Identity, co-editor with Sara Saleh (2019)
- Coming of Age in the War on Terror (2021)
- Maku (children's fiction, co-authored with Meyne Wyatt, 2022)
- 11 Words for Love (illustrated by Maxine Beneba Clarke, 2022)
- The Very Best Doughnut (2024)
- Discipline (2025)
