= 2007 in Australian literature =

This article presents a list of the historical events and publications of Australian literature during 2007.

== Events ==
- Surrender by Sonya Hartnett, and The Book Thief by Markus Zusak are named as Honor Books in the 2007 American Library Association's Michael L. Printz Award for Excellence in Young Adult Literature.
- "The Guardian" newspaper from the UK reports that Borders plans to sell its Australian stores.
- The small township of Clunes, about 20 kilometres north of Ballarat in Victoria, decides to try to set up Australia's first dedicated booktown. The first weekend event takes place on 20 May.
- AustLit (www.austlit.edu.au), the major Australian literature resource for research and teaching housed at the University of Queensland, announces the commencement of "Black Words", a literary website specialising in Australian Indigenous writers and storytellers and their works.
- Federal Education minister, Julie Bishop, announces that the Australian Government will allocate funds to A$1.5m to create a Chair of Australian Literature in an Australian university.
- Charlie Rimmer, Group Commercial Manager for Angus and Robertson bookshops, writes to a number of Australian independent publishers indicating that the bookshop chain will refuse to stock their books without compensation.
- Lonely Planet, the iconic Australian publisher of travel guides, is sold to the commercial division of the BBC in a deal reportedly worth A$200 million.
- Australia's new Prime Minister, Kevin Rudd, announces a major new literary prize of $100,000 in both fiction and non-fiction categories.
- Australia-Asia Literary Award established.

== Major publications ==
=== Literary fiction ===
- David Brooks – The Fern Tattoo
- Steven Carroll – The Time We Have Taken
- Belinda Castles – The River Baptists
- Jon Cleary – Four-Cornered Circle
- J. M. Coetzee – Diary of a Bad Year
- Matthew Condon – The Trout Opera
- Steven Conte – The Zookeeper's War
- Gregory Day – Ron McCoy's Sea of Diamonds
- Michelle de Kretser – The Lost Dog
- Nicholas Drayson – Love and the Platypus
- Karen Foxlee – The Anatomy of Wings
- Rodney Hall – Love Without Hope
- Janette Turner Hospital – Orpheus Lost
- Gail Jones – Sorry
- Mireille Juchau – Burning In
- Thomas Keneally – The Widow and Her Hero
- Malcolm Knox – Jamaica
- Christopher Koch – The Memory Room
- Carol Lefevre – Nights in the Asylum
- Colleen McCullough – Antony and Cleopatra
- Rhyll McMaster – Feather Man
- David Malouf – The Complete Stories
- Alex Miller – Landscape of Farewell
- Kate Morton – The House at Riverton
- Nicholas Shakespeare – Secrets of the Sea
- Allayne Webster – Our Little Secret
- Jessica White – A Curious Intimacy
- Charlotte Wood – The Children
- Geraldine Wooller – The Seamstress

=== Children's and Young Adult fiction ===
- Alexandra Adornetto – The Shadow Thief
- Sherryl Clark – Sixth Grade Style Queen (Not!), illus by Elissa Christian
- John Flanagan
  - Erak's Ransom
  - The Siege of Macindaw
- Mem Fox – Where the Giant Sleeps
- Jackie French
  - Pharaoh: The Boy Who Conquered the Nile
  - The Shaggy Gully Times, illus by Bruce Whatley
- Jane Godwin – Falling from Grace
- Sonya Hartnett – The Ghost's Child
- Lian Hearn – Heaven's Net is Wide
- John Heffernan – Marty's Shadow
- Odo Hirsch – Amelia Dee and the Peacock Lamp
- Justine Larbalestier – Magic's Child
- Brigid Lowry – Tomorrow All Will Be Beautiful
- Juliet Marillier – Cybele's Secret
- Meme McDonald – Love Like Water
- David Metzenthen
  - Black Water
  - Winning the World Cup, illus by Stephen Axelsen
- Garth Nix – Lady Friday
- Leonie Norrington – Leaving Barrumbi
- Emily Rodda – The Key to Rondo
- Scott Westerfeld – Extras
- Carole Wilkinson – Dragon Moon

=== Crime and Mystery ===
- Mark Abernethy – Golden Serpent
- John Clanchy and Mark Henshaw (J.M. Calder) – And Hope to Die
- Garry Disher – Chain of Evidence
- Kathryn Fox – Skin and Bone
- Robert Gott – Amongst the Dead
- Kerry Greenwood – Trick or Treat
- Sarah Hopkins – The Crimes of Billy Fish
- Katherine Howell – Frantic
- Gabrielle Lord – Shattered
- Shane Maloney – Sucked In
- Dorothy Porter – El Dorado
- Leigh Redhead – Cherry Pie
- Michael Robotham – The Night Ferry
- Steve Toltz – A Fraction of the Whole
- Chris Womersley – The Low Road

=== Romance ===
- Anna Campbell – Claiming the Courtesan
- Emma Darcy – The Billionaire's Scandalous Marriage
- Lilian Darcy – Cafe du Jour
- Kimberley Freeman – Duet
- Anna Jacobs – Tomorrow's Promises
- Melanie La'Brooy – Serendipity
- Tamara McKinley – Lands Beyond the Sea

=== Science Fiction and Fantasy ===
- David Conyers & John Sunseri – The Spiraling Worm
- Marianne de Pierres – Dark Space
- Sara Douglass – The Serpent Bride
- Greg Egan
  - "Dark Integers"
  - "Glory"
  - "Induction"
- Lian Hearn – Heaven's Net is Wide
- Jack Heath – Remote Control
- David Kowalski – The Company of the Dead
- Karen Miller
  - Empress of Mijak
  - The Riven Kingdom
- James Moloney – Master of the Books
- Jason Nahrung & Mil Clayton – The Darkness Within
- Garth Nix – "Sir Hereward and Mister Fitz Go to War Again"
- Susan Parisi – Blood of Dreams
- Ben Peek – Black Sheep: A Dystopian Novel
- Matthew Reilly – Hell Island
- Jonathan Strahan – The New Space Opera (edited)
- Sean Williams – Saturn Returns

=== Drama ===
- Stephen Carleton – The Narcissist
- Michael Gow – Toy Symphony
- Tom Holloway – Beyond the Neck
- Caleb Lewis – Dogfall
- Katherine Thomson – King Tide
- Alana Valentine – Parramatta Girls

=== Poetry ===
- Judith Bishop – Event
- David Brooks – Urban Elegies
- Brook Emery — Uncommon Light
- Lisa Gorton – Press Release
- J. S. Harry – Not Finding Wittgenstein
- Kathryn Lomer – Two Kinds of Silence
- David Malouf – Typewriter Music
- Dorothy Porter – El Dorado
- Peter Rose – The Best Australian Poems 2007 (edited)
- Peter Skrzynecki – Old/New World
- John Tranter – The Best Australian Poetry 2007 (edited)
- Petra White – The Incoming Tide

=== Non-fiction ===
- Waleed Aly – People Like Us
- Janet Fife-Yeomans – Killing Jodie
- Tom Griffiths – Slicing the Silence: Voyaging to Antarctica
- Clive James – Cultural Amnesia: Notes in the Margin of My Time
- Paul Ham – Vietnam: The Australian War
- Philip Jones – Ochre and Rust: Artefacts and Encounters on Australian Frontiers
- Evan McHugh – Red Centre, Dark Heart
- Nicolas Rothwell – Another Country
- Tessa Wigney, Kerrie Eyers and Gordon Parker – Journeys with the Black Dog (editors)

=== Children's and Young Adult Non-fiction ===
- Christobel Mattingley – Battle Order 204

=== Biographies ===
- Philip Dwyer – Napoleon: The Path To Power 1769–1799
- Kim Huynh – Where the Sea Takes Us
- Mark Kurzem – The Mascot
- Brenda Niall – Life Class: The Education of a Biographer
- Craig Sherborne – Muck
- Jeff Sparrow – Communism: A Love Story

== Awards and honours ==
=== Lifetime achievement ===
Award	Author
Christopher Brennan Award	John Kinsella
Patrick White Award	David Rowbotham

=== Literary ===
Award	Author	Title	Publisher
The Age Book of the Year	Peter Cochrane	Colonial Ambition: Foundations of Australian Democracy	Melbourne University Press
ALS Gold Medal	Alexis Wright	Carpentaria	Giramondo
Colin Roderick Award	Deborah Robertson	Careless	Vintage
Nita Kibble Literary Award	Deborah Robertson	Careless	Vintage

=== Fiction ===
==== International ====
Award	Region	Category	Author	Title	Publisher
Commonwealth Writers' Prize	SE Asia and South Pacific	Best First Novel	Andrew O'Connor	Tuvalu	Allen and Unwin

==== National ====
Award	Author	Title	Publisher
ABC Fiction Award	Damian McDonald	Luck in the Greater West	ABC Books
Adelaide Festival Awards for Literature	Not awarded		
The Age Book of the Year Award	David Malouf	Every Move You Make	Chatto & Windus
The Australian/Vogel Literary Award	Stefan Laszczuk	I Dream of Magda	Allen and Unwin
Miles Franklin Award	Alexis Wright	Carpentaria	Giramondo
New South Wales Premier's Literary Awards	Peter Carey	Theft: A Love Story	Alfred A. Knopf
Queensland Premier's Literary Awards	Alexis Wright	Carpentaria	Giramondo
Victorian Premier's Literary Awards	Alexis Wright	Carpentaria	Giramondo
Western Australian Premier's Book Awards	Stephen Scourfield	Other Country	Allen & Unwin

=== Children and Young Adult ===
==== International ====
Award	Author	Title	Publisher
Andre Norton Award	Justine Larbalestier	Magic or Madness	Penguin Books

==== National ====
Award	Category	Author	Title	Publisher
Children's Book of the Year Award	Older Readers	Margo Lanagan	Red Spikes	Allen & Unwin
Children's Book of the Year Award	Younger Readers	Catherine Bateson	Being Bee	University of Queensland Press
Children's Book of the Year Award	Picture Book	Shaun Tan	The Arrival	Lothian
Children's Book of the Year Award	Early Childhood	Libby Gleeson, illus. Freya Blackwood	Amy and Louis	Scholastic Press
Davitt Award	Young Adult	Jaclyn Moriarty	The Betrayal of Bindy Mackenzie	Pan Books
New South Wales Premier's Literary Awards	Children's	Narelle Oliver	Home	Omnibus Books
New South Wales Premier's Literary Awards	Young People's	Ursula Dubosarsky	The Red Shoe	Allen & Unwin
Queensland Premier's Literary Awards	Children's	Glenda Millard	Layla Queen of Hearts	ABC Books
Queensland Premier's Literary Awards	Young Adult	Judith Clarke	One Whole and Perfect Day	Allen & Unwin
Victorian Premier's Literary Awards	Young Adult Fiction	Simmone Howell	Notes from the Teenage Underground	Macmillan
Western Australian Premier's Book Awards	Writing for Young Adults	Kate McCaffrey	Destroying Avalon	Fremantle Arts Centre Press
Western Australian Premier's Book Awards	Children's	Shaun Tan	The Arrival	Lothian

=== Crime and Mystery ===
==== International ====
Award	Category	Author	Title	Publisher
Duncan Lawrie Dagger		Peter Temple	The Broken Shore	Text Publishing

==== National ====
Award	Category	Author	Title	Publisher
Davitt Award	Novel	Sydney Bauer	Undertow	Macmillan
Davitt Award	Young Adult Novel	Jaclyn Moriarty	The Betrayal of Bindy Mackenzie	Macmillan
Davitt Award	True Crime	Karen Kissane	Silent Death: The Killing of Julie Ramage	Hodder
Davitt Award	Readers' Choice	Kerry Greenwood	Devil's Food	Allen & Unwin
Davitt Award	Readers' Choice	Karen Kissane	Silent Death: The Killing of Julie Ramage	Hodder
Ned Kelly Awards	Novel	Garry Disher	Chain of Evidence	Soho Press
Ned Kelly Awards	First novel	Adrian Hyland	Diamond Dove	Text Publishing
Ned Kelly Awards	True crime	Liz Porter	Written on the Skin	Pan Macmillan
Ned Kelly Awards	True crime	Debi Marshall	Killing For Pleasure: The Definitive Story of the Snowtown Murders	Random House
Ned Kelly Awards	Lifetime Achievement	Sandra Harvey and Lindsay Simpson		

=== Science fiction ===
Award	Category	Author	Title	Publisher
Aurealis Award	Novel	Will Elliott	The Pilo Family Circus	ABC Books
Aurealis Award	Short Story	Shaun Tan	The Arrival	Lothian
Ditmar Award	Novel	Will Elliott	The Pilo Family Circus	ABC Books
Ditmar Award	Novella/Novelette	Paul Haines	"The Devil in Mr Pussy (Or How I Found God Inside My Wife)"	Coeur de Lion Publishing
Ditmar Award	Short Story	Rjurik Davidson	"The Fear of White"	Borderlands #7
Ditmar Award	Collected Work	edited by Bill Congreve & Michelle Marquardt	The Year's Best Australian Science Fiction and Fantasy Vol. 2	Mirrordanse Books
Australian Shadows Award		Will Elliott	The Pilo Family Circus	ABC Books

=== Poetry ===
Award	Author	Title	Publisher
Adelaide Festival Awards for Literature	Not awarded		
The Age Book of the Year	Robert Adamson	The Goldfinches of Baghdad	Flood Editions
Anne Elder Award	Judith Bishop	Event	Salt Publishing
Grace Leven Prize for Poetry	Robert Adamson	The Goldfinches of Baghdad	Flood Editions
Mary Gilmore Prize	Not awarded		
New South Wales Premier's Literary Awards	John Tranter	Urban Myths: 210 Poems	University of Queensland Press
Queensland Premier's Literary Awards	Laurie Duggan	The Passenger	University of Queensland Press
Victorian Premier's Literary Awards	Judy Johnson	Jack	Pandanus Press
Western Australian Premier's Book Awards	Hal Colebatch	The Light River	Connor Court Publishing

=== Drama ===
Award	Author	Title	Publisher
Patrick White Playwrights' Award (joint winners)	Angus Cerini	Wretch	
Patrick White Playwrights' Award (joint winners)	Timothy Daly	The Man in the Attic	

=== Non-Fiction ===
Award	Category	Author	Title	Publisher
Adelaide Festival Awards for Literature	Non-Fiction	Not awarded		
The Age Book of the Year	Non-fiction	Peter Cochrane	Colonial Ambition: Foundations of Australian Democracy	Melbourne University Press
Davitt Award	True crime	Karen Kissane	Silent Death: The Killing of Julie Ramage	Hachette Australia
National Biography Award	Biography	Jacob Rosenberg	East of Time	Brandl & Schlesinger
Prime Minister's Prize for Australian History		Les Carlyon	The Great War	Macmillan
Prime Minister's Prize for Australian History		Peter Cochrane	Colonial Ambition: Foundations of Australian Democracy	Melbourne University Press
New South Wales Premier's Literary Awards	Non-fiction	Robert Hughes	Things I Didn't Know: A Memoir	Alfred A. Knopf
New South Wales Premier's History Awards	Australian History	Libby Robin	How a Continent Created a Nation	University of NSW Press
New South Wales Premier's History Awards	Community and Regional History	Regina Ganter	Mixed Relations: Asian Aboriginal Contact in North Australia	University of Western Australia Press
New South Wales Premier's History Awards	General History	Christopher Clark	Iron Kingdom: The Rise and Downfall of Prussia, 1600–1947	Harvard University Press
New South Wales Premier's History Awards	Young People's	John Nicholson	Songlines and Stone Axes	Allen & Unwin
Queensland Premier's Literary Awards	Non-fiction	Tom Griffith	Slicing the Silence: Voyaging to Antarctica	University of NSW Press
Queensland Premier's Literary Awards	History	Christopher Clark	Iron Kingdom: The Rise and Downfall of Prussia, 1600–1947	Harvard University Press
Victorian Premier's Literary Awards	Non-fiction	Danielle Clode	Voyages to the South Seas: In Search of Terres Australes	Melbourne University Press

== Deaths ==
- 13 February – Elizabeth Jolley, author (born 1923)
- 22 February – Joyce Lee, poet (born 1913)
- 2 March – David A. Myers, poet and publisher (born 1942)
- 23 May – John Croyston, poet (born 1933)
- 11 July – Glenda Adams, author (born 1939)
- 11 July – Noel Rowe, poet (born 1951)
- 1 August – Mona Brand, playwright (born 1915)
- 24 August – Philip Grundy, translator (born 1932)
- 16 October – Steve J. Spears, author and playwright (born 1951)
- 31 October – Eric Rolls, author (born 1923)
- 24 December – Jan McKemmish, author (born 1950)

== See also ==
- 2007 in Australia
- 2007 in literature
- 2007 in poetry
- List of years in literature
- List of years in Australian literature
- List of Australian literary awards
