= 2006 in Australian literature =

This article presents a list of the historical events and publications of Australian literature during 2006.

== Events ==
- South African-born Nobel laureate J. M. Coetzee takes up Australian citizenship
- Australia's Prime Minister, John Howard, complains about the modern school English syllabus, stating that it is being "dumbed down"
- Peter Carey's ex-wife, Alison Summers, takes a swipe at the author, accusing him of using his fiction to settle some old scores. She refers to a minor character in Carey's novel Theft: A Love Story (called The Plaintiff) and announces she is also writing a novel, titled Mrs Jekyll
- the ABC board decides against publishing the new Chris Masters' book Jonestown, an unauthorised biography of Alan Jones, a Sydney radio presenter
- the Australian Classification Review Board bans two radical Islamic books, prompting calls from the Australian Attorney-General for the Board to provide with even tougher laws
- a large treasure trove of missing papers belonging to Patrick White is revealed to the public. Contrary to the wishes expressed in White's will, his literary executor, Barbara Mobbs, did not destroy the material but kept it and has since offered it to the National Library of Australia

== Major publications ==
=== Literary fiction ===
- Azhar Abidi – Passarola Rising
- Venero Armanno – Candle Life
- Max Barry – Company
- James Bradley – The Resurrectionist
- Peter Carey – Theft: A Love Story
- John Charalambous – Silent Parts
- Tegan Bennett Daylight – Safety
- Richard Flanagan – The Unknown Terrorist
- Sandra Hall – Beyond the Break
- Sheridan Hay – The Secret of Lost Things
- M. J. Hyland – Carry Me Down
- Gail Jones – Dreams of Speaking
- Simone Lazaroo – The Travel Writer
- Kate Legge – The Unexpected Elements of Love
- Angelo Loukakis – The Memory of Tides
- Andrew McGahan – Underground
- William McInnes – Cricket Kings
- Nerida Newton – Death of a Whaler
- Andrew O'Connor – Tuvalu
- D. B. C. Pierre – Ludmila's Broken English
- Cameron S. Redfern – Landscape with Animals
- Deborah Robertson – Careless
- David Whish-Wilson – The Summons
- Mike Williams – The Music of Dunes
- Alexis Wright – Carpentaria

=== Short story collections ===
- David Malouf – Every Move You Make

=== Children's and Young Adult fiction ===
- Catherine Bateson – Being Bee
- Michael Gerard Bauer – Don't Call Me Ishmael!
- Isobelle Carmody – A Fox Called Sorrow
- D. M. Cornish – Monster Blood Tattoo: Foundling
- Alison Croggon – The Crow
- Ursula Dubosarsky – The Red Shoe
- Mem Fox – A Particular Cow
- Jackie French – Macbeth and Son
- Scot Gardner – Gravity
- Lian Hearn – The Harsh Cry of the Heron
- Simmone Howell – Notes from the Teenage Underground
- Stephen Michael King – Layla, Queen of Hearts
- Margo Lanagan – Red Spikes
- Justine Larbalestier – Magic Lessons
- Kate McCaffrey – Destroying Avalon
- Melina Marchetta – On the Jellicoe Road
- Juliet Marillier – Wildwood Dancing
- John Marsden – Circle of Flight
- Jaclyn Moriarty – The Betrayal of Bindy Mackenzie
- Garth Nix – Sir Thursday
- Shaun Tan – The Arrival
- Scott Westerfeld
  - The Last Days
  - Peeps

=== Crime and Mystery ===
- Robert G. Barrett – The Tesla Legacy
- Sydney Bauer – Undertow
- John Birmingham – Final Impact
- Laurent Boulanger – Better Dead Than Never
- Marshall Browne
  - Inspector Anders and the Blood Vendetta
  - Rendezvous at Kamakura Inn
- Paul Cleave – The Cleaner
- Peter Corris – The Undertow
- Kathryn Fox – Without Consent
- Kerry Greenwood – Devil's Food
- Edwina Grey – Prismatic
- Marion Halligan – The Apricot Colonel
- Katherine Howell – Frantic
- Adrian Hyland – Diamond Dove
- Martin Livings – Carnies
- Barry Maitland – Spider Trap
- P. D. Martin – The Murderers’ Club
- Jaclyn Moriarty – The Betrayal of Bindi Mackenzie
- Tara Moss – Hit
- Kel Robertson – Dead Set
- Angela Savage – Behind the Night Bazaar
- Lindsay Simpson – The Curer of Souls

=== Romance ===
- Marion Campbell – Shadow Thief
- Marion Lennox – Princess of Convenience
- Di Morrissey – The Valley

=== Science Fiction and Fantasy ===
- Damien Broderick – K-Machines
- D. M. Cornish – Monster Blood Tattoo: Foundling
- Sara Douglass – Druid's Sword
- Terry Dowling – Basic Black: Tales of Appropriate Fear
- Grace Dugan – The Silver Road
- Will Elliott – The Pilo Family Circus
- Edwina Grey – Prismatic
- Margo Lanagan
  - "A Fine Magic"
  - Red Spikes
- Martin J. Livings – Carnies
- Brett McBean – The Mother
- Sean McMullen – Voidfarer
- Michael Pryor – Blaze of Glory
- Sean Williams & Shane Dix – Geodesica Descent

=== Drama ===
- Jane Malone – The Rumour
- Tommy Murphy – Holding the Man
- Debra Oswald – The Peach Season
- Stephen Sewell – It Just Stopped

=== Poetry ===
- Robert Adamson – The Goldfinches of Baghdad
- Laurie Duggan – The Passenger
- Brook Emery — At a Slight Angle: And Other Poems
- Dennis Haskell – All the Time in the World
- Judy Johnson – Jack
- S. K. Kelen – Earthly Delights
- Graeme Miles – Phosphorescence
- Les Murray – The Biplane Houses
- Mark Reid – A Difficult Faith
- Thomas Shapcott – The City of Empty Rooms
- John Tranter – Urban Myths: 210 Poems
- Simon West – First Names
- Fay Zwicky – Picnic

=== Non-fiction ===
- Peter Andrews – Back from the Brink: How Australia's Landscape Can Be Saved
- Janine Burke – The Gods of Freud: Sigmund Freud's Art Collection
- Les Carlyon – The Great War
- Neil Chenoweth – Packer's Lunch
- Inga Clendinnen – Agamemnon's Kiss
- Peter Cochrane – Colonial Ambition: Foundations of Australian Democracy
- Peter Edwards – Arthur Tange: The Last of the Mandarins
- Ken Inglis – Whose ABC? : The Australian Broadcasting Commission 1983–2006
- Justine Larbalestier – Daughters of Earth: Feminist Science Fiction in the Twentieth Century

=== Biographies ===
- Quentin Beresford – Rob Riley: an Aboriginal Leader's Quest for Justice
- Michael Gurr – Days Like These
- Robert Hughes – Things I Didn't Know
- Elizabeth Jolley & Caroline Lurie – Learning to Dance
- Sylvia Martin – Ida Leeson: A Life
- Chris Masters – Jonestown: The Power and the Myth of Alan Jones
- Alice Pung – Unpolished Gem

== Awards and honours ==
=== Lifetime achievement ===
| Award | Author |
|---|---|
| Christopher Brennan Award | Geoff Page |
| Melbourne Prize for Literature | Helen Garner |
| Patrick White Award | Morris Lurie |

=== Literary ===
| Award | Author | Title | Publisher |
|---|---|---|---|
| The Age Book of the Year | Jennifer Maiden | Friendly Fire | Giramondo Publishing |
| ALS Gold Medal | Gregory Day | The Patron Saint of Eels | Picador |
| Colin Roderick Award | Peter Temple | The Broken Shore | Text Publishing |
| Nita Kibble Literary Award | Brenda Walker | The Wing of Night | Viking Press |

=== Fiction ===
==== International ====
| Award | Category | Author | Title | Publisher |
|---|---|---|---|---|
| Commonwealth Writers' Prize | Best Novel, SE Asia and South Pacific region | Kate Grenville | The Secret River | Text Publishing |
| Commonwealth Writers' Prize | Best Novel, Overall | Kate Grenville | The Secret River | Text Publishing |

==== National ====
| Award | Author | Title | Publisher |
|---|---|---|---|
| ABC Fiction Award | Will Elliott | The Pilo Family Circus | ABC Books |
| Adelaide Festival Awards for Literature | Gail Jones | Sixty Lights | Vintage Books |
| The Age Book of the Year Award | Christos Tsiolkas | Dead Europe | Vintage |
| The Australian/Vogel Literary Award | Belinda Castles | The River Baptists | Allen and Unwin |
| Miles Franklin Award | Roger McDonald | The Ballad of Desmond Kale | Vintage |
| New South Wales Premier's Literary Awards | Kate Grenville | The Secret River | Text Publishing |
| Queensland Premier's Literary Awards | Brian Castro | The Garden Book | Giramondo Publishing |
| South Australian Premier's Awards | Gail Jones | Sixty Lights | Harvill Press |
| Victorian Premier's Literary Award | Peter Carey | Theft: A Love Story | Knopf |
| Western Australian Premier's Book Awards | Simon Lazaroo | The Travel Writer | Pan Macmillan |

=== Children and Young Adult ===
==== National ====
| Award | Category | Author | Title | Publisher |
|---|---|---|---|---|
| Children's Book of the Year Award | Older Readers | J. C. Burke | The Story of Tom Brennan | Random House |
| Children's Book of the Year Award | Younger Readers | Elizabeth Fensham | Helicopter Man | Bloomsbury Press |
| Children's Book of the Year Award | Picture Book | Colin Thompson | The Short and Incredibly Happy Life of Riley | Lothian |
| Children's Book of the Year Award | Early Childhood | Deborah Niland | Annie's Chair | Viking Books |
| Davitt Award | Young Adult | Catherine Jinks | Evil Genius | Allen and Unwin |
| New South Wales Premier's Literary Awards | Children's | Kierin Meehan | In the Monkey Forest | Penguin Books |
| New South Wales Premier's Literary Awards | Young People's | Ursula Dubosarsky | Theodora's Gift | Penguin Books |
| Queensland Premier's Literary Awards | Children's | Martine Murray | The Slightly Bruised Glory of Cedar B. Hartley | Allen & Unwin |
| Queensland Premier's Literary Awards | Young Adult | Ursula Dubosarsky | The Red Shoe | Allen & Unwin |
| South Australian Premier's Awards | Children's | Barry Jonsberg | It's Not All About you, Calma! | Allen & Unwin |
| Victorian Premier's Literary Award | Young Adult Fiction | Ursula Dubosarsky | Theodora's Gift | Penguin Books |
| Western Australian Premier's Book Awards | Writing for Young Adults | Kirsty Murray | A Prayer for Blue Delaney | Allen & Unwin |
| Western Australian Premier's Book Awards | Children's | Wendy Binks | Where's Stripey? | Stunned Emu Press |

=== Crime and Mystery ===
==== National ====
| Award | Category | Author | Title | Publisher |
|---|---|---|---|---|
| Davitt Award | Novel | Heather Rose | The Butterfly Man | University of Queensland Press |
| Davitt Award | Readers' Choice | Kerry Greenwood | Heavenly Pleasures | Allen & Unwin |
| Davitt Award | Readers' Choice | Leigh Redhead | Rubdown | Allen & Unwin |
| Davitt Award | Young Adult Novel | Catherine Jinks | Evil Genius | Allen & Unwin |
| Ned Kelly Award | Novel | Chris Nyst | Crook as Rookwood | HarperCollins |
| Ned Kelly Award | Novel | Peter Temple | The Broken Shore | Text Publishing |
| Ned Kelly Award | First novel | Wendy James | Out of the Silence | Random House |
| Ned Kelly Award | True crime | Lauchlin McCulloch | Packing Death | Floradale/Sly Ink |
| Ned Kelly Award | Lifetime achievement | Andrew Rule & John Silvester | | |

=== Science fiction ===
| Award | Category | Author | Title | Publisher |
|---|---|---|---|---|
| Aurealis Award | Novel | Damien Broderick | K-Machines | Thunder's Mouth Press |
| Aurealis Award | Short Story | Sean Williams | "The Seventh Letter" | Bulletin Magazine, Summer Reading Edition |
| Ditmar Award | Novel | Sean Williams & Shane Dix | Geodesica: Ascent | HarperCollins |
| Ditmar Award | Novella/Novelette | Kaaron Warren | "The Grinding House" | The Grinding House |
| Ditmar Award | Short Story | Kaaron Warren | "Fresh Young Widow" | The Grinding House |
| Ditmar Award | Collected Work | Robert Hood & Robin Pen | Daikaiju! Giant Monster Tales | Agog! Press |
| Australian Shadows Award | | Will Elliott | The Pilo Family Circus | ABC Books |

=== Poetry ===
| Award | Author | Title | Publisher |
|---|---|---|---|
| Adelaide Festival Awards for Literature | Luke Davies | Totem | Allen & Unwin |
| The Age Book of the Year | Jennifer Maiden | Friendly Fire | Giramondo Publishing |
| Anne Elder Award | Libby Hart | Fresh News from the Arctic | Interactive Press |
| Grace Leven Prize for Poetry | Alan Gould | The Past Completes Me: Selected Poems 1973–2003 | University of Queensland Press |
| Mary Gilmore Prize | David McCooey | Blister Pack | Salt Publishing |
| New South Wales Premier's Literary Awards | Jaya Savige | Latecomers | University of Queensland Press |
| Queensland Premier's Literary Awards | John Kinsella | The New Arcadia | Fremantle Arts Centre Press |
| Victorian Premier's Literary Award | John Tranter | Urban Myths: 210 Poems | University of Queensland Press |
| Western Australian Premier's Book Awards | Dennis Haskell | All the Time in the World | Salt Publishing |

=== Drama ===
| Award | Author | Title | Publisher |
|---|---|---|---|
| Patrick White Playwrights' Award | Patricia Cornelius | Do Not Go Gentle... | Currency Press |

=== Non-Fiction ===
| Award | Category | Author | Title | Publisher |
|---|---|---|---|---|
| Adelaide Festival Awards for Literature | Non-Fiction | Mandy Sayer | Velocity | Vintage Books |
| The Age Book of the Year | Non-Fiction | Mandy Sayer | Velocity | Vintage Books |
| National Biography Award | Biography | John Hughes | The Idea of Home: Autobiographical Essays | Giramondo Publishing |
| New South Wales Premier's Literary Awards | Non-Fiction | Jacob Rosenberg | East of Time | Brandl & Schlesinger |
| New South Wales Premier's History Awards | Australian History | Richard Broome | Aboriginal Victorians: A History Since 1800 | Allen & Unwin |
| New South Wales Premier's History Awards | Community and Regional History | Maria Nugent | Botany Bay: Where Histories Meet | Allen & Unwin |
| New South Wales Premier's History Awards | General History | R. J. B. Bosworth | Mussolini's Italy: Life Under the Dictatorship 1915-1945 | Penguin Books |
| New South Wales Premier's History Awards | Young People's | Pamela Freeman | The Black Dress: Mary MacKillop’s Early Years | Black Dog Books |
| Queensland Premier's Literary Awards | Non-fiction | Neil Chenoweth | Packer's Lunch: A Rollicking Tale of Swiss Bank Accounts and Money-Making | Allen & Unwin |
| Queensland Premier's Literary Awards | History | Peter Edwards | Arthur Tange: The Last of the Mandarins | Allen & Unwin |
| Victorian Premier's Literary Award | Non-fiction | Helen Ennis | Margaret Michaelis: Love, Loss and Photography | National Gallery of Australia |

== Deaths ==
- 12 January – Rae Sexton, poet (born 1936 in New Zealand)
- 16 March – Michael Dugan, writer for children (born 1947)
- 14 April – Geoffrey Bewley, journalist and short story writer (born 1947)
- 6 July – Lisa Bellear, poet (born 1961)
- 10 July – Vera Newsom, poet (born 1912 in England)
- 16 August – Alex Buzo, dramatist (born 1944)
- 4 September – Colin Thiele, writer for children (born 1920)
- 13 September – J. E. Macdonnell, novelist of the sea (born 1917)
- 22 September – Joy Williams, poet (born 1942)
- 3 October – Gwen Meredith, novelist (born 1907)

Unknown date

- Cecily Crozier, artist, poet and literary editor who co-founded A Comment (born 1911)
- Barbara Giles, poet (born 1912)

== See also ==
- 2006 in Australia
- 2006 in literature
- 2006 in poetry
- List of years in literature
- List of years in Australian literature
- List of Australian literary awards
