= Our Little Secret =

Our Little Secret may refer to:

- Our Little Secret (album), a 1997 Lords of Acid album
- Our Little Secret (novel), a 2007 novel by Allayne Webster
- Our Little Secret (film), a 2024 film

== See also ==
- Little Secrets (disambiguation)
