= Craig Davidson =

Canadian author

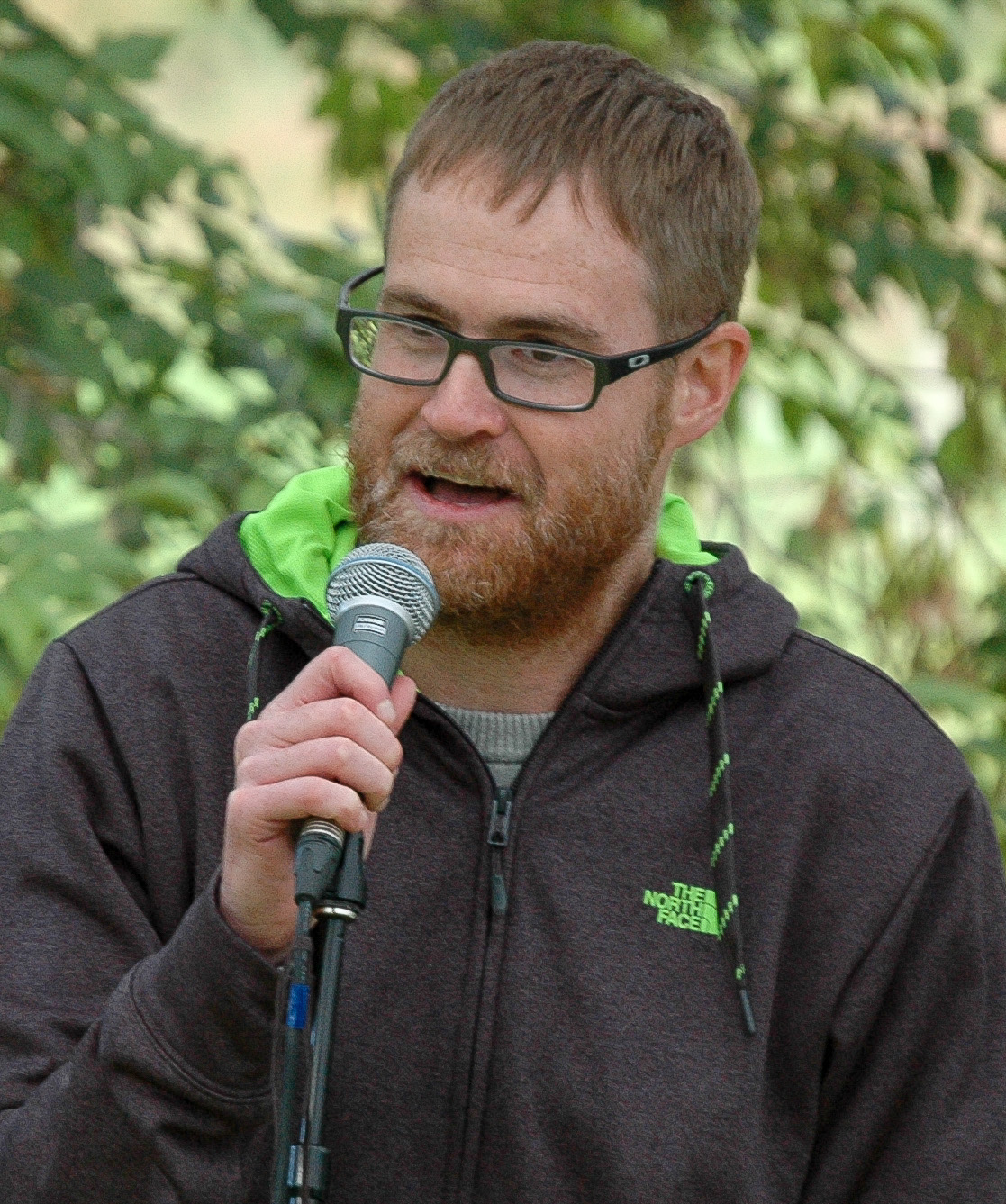
- Davidson at the Eden Mills Writers' Festival in 2015
- Born: 1975 (age 50–51); Toronto, Ontario, Canada
- Education: Trent University; University of New Brunswick
- Occupations: Novelist, short stories writer
- Writing career
- Pen name: Patrick Lestewka, Nick Cutter
- Language: English
- Period: 2000s–present
- Notable works: Rust and Bone (2005); Cataract City (2013)
- Website: craigdavidson.net

Craig Davidson (born 1975) is a Canadian author of short stories and novels, who has published work under both his name and the pen names Patrick Lestewka and Nick Cutter.

== Early life ==
Born in Toronto, Ontario, he was raised in Calgary and St. Catharines. Davidson earned a B.A. in classical literature at Trent University, an M.A. in English and creative writing at the University of New Brunswick., an M.F.A. at the University of Iowa, and a Ph.D. in creative writing at the University of Birmingham, UK.

== Career ==
His first short story collection, Rust and Bone, was later published in September 2005 by Penguin Books Canada, and was a finalist for the 2006 Danuta Gleed Literary Award. Stories in Rust and Bone have also been adapted into a play by Australian playwright Caleb Lewis and a Golden Globe-nominated film by French director Jacques Audiard.

Davidson also released a novel in 2007 named The Fighter. During the course of his research of the novel, Davidson went on a 16-week steroid cycle. To promote the release of the novel, Davidson participated in a fully sanctioned boxing match against Toronto poet Michael Knox at Florida Jack's Boxing Gym; for the novel's subsequent release in the United States, his publisher organized a similar promotional boxing match against Jonathan Ames. Davidson lost both matches.

His 2013 novel Cataract City was named as a shortlisted nominee for the 2013 Scotiabank Giller Prize.

In addition to his literary fiction, Davidson has also published several works of horror literature using the pseudonyms Patrick Lestewka and Nick Cutter. In 2014, he released the thriller novel The Troop, with The Deep following in 2015.

In 2018, his memoir Precious Cargo, about a year spent driving a bus for disabled children in Calgary, was a finalist for Canada Reads.

His 2018 novel The Saturday Night Ghost Club was a shortlisted finalist for the Rogers Writers' Trust Fiction Prize and was an American Booksellers Association Indie Next Great Reads selection in July 2019. This novel tells the story of a young boy who is coming-of-age while spending Saturdays catching ghosts with his eccentric Uncle Calvin. It explores themes of grief, depression, family, friendship, and growing into adulthood.

Davidson's work has received acclaim from notable authors such as Stephen King, Scott Smith, and Jonathan Maberry.

== Bibliography ==
- Rust and Bone (2005)
- The Fighter (2008)
- Sarah Court (2010)
- Cataract City (2013) (shortlisted for the 2013 Scotiabank Giller Prize)
- Precious Cargo (2016)
- The Saturday Night Ghost Club (2018)
- Cascade (2020)

=== as Patrick Lestewka ===
- Mother Bitchfight (2003)
- The Preserve (2004)
- Imprint (2011)
- The Coliseum (2011)
- Vehicles (2012)

=== as Nick Cutter ===
- The Troop (2014)
- The Deep (2015)
- The Acolyte (2015)
- Little Heaven (2017)
- The Breach (2020)
- The Handyman Method (with Andrew F. Sullivan) (2023)
- The Queen (2024)
- The Dorians (2026)
- The Coffin Worms: Novellas (2027)
