= ABC Fiction Award =

Australian literary award

The ABC Fiction Award was an Australian literary award presented annually to the best, original, unpublished, adult fiction manuscript, written by an Australian resident over the age of 18. It was launched in 2005. The aim of the award was "to encourage emerging writers, contribute to Australian literary culture, and fulfil the ABC's charter by reflecting the diversity of the Australian community and adding to a sense of national identity". The award was supported by ABC Local Radio and ABC TV.

The prize was a A$10,000 advance and publication through ABC Books. The winning book was also broadcast on ABC Local Radio and published as an audio book by ABC Audio. The award had four judges, three of whom changed each year. It comprised ABC Books commissioning editor Jo Mackay, a fiction writer, a local ABC radio broadcaster, and someone involved in literary education or debate such as a newspaper literary editor.

== Background ==
The award was the brainchild of the ABC Books publisher, Stuart Neal, and Jo Mackay, who were concerned about the falling sales of literary fiction.

Jo Mackay said that they took pride in the fact that the competition, unlike most other new manuscript competitions which are geared to young writers, has no age restrictions. Stuart Neal argued that such competitions are important. He said that "if competitions like this can unearth the next Tim Winton, for example, then there's a major economic benefit, as well as the benefit to the literary world, of unknown writers getting a go. If you don't do things like this you don't find the next hot Australian fiction writer". However, he said that commercial potential was not a criterion used by the judges.

== History ==
The inaugural winner was The Pilo Family Circus by Will Elliott. It went on to win the Aurealis Award for Best Novel, the Ditmar Award for Best Horror Novel and was shortlisted for the International Horror Guild Award. There were some 900 entries in the first year, and 300-400 entries the next two years.

Early judges of the award included novelists Delia Falconer and Luke Davies, and literary editor of The Australian Murray Waldren.

The award came to an end when ABC books was taken over by HarperCollins in 2009 ending fiction publishing.

== Winners ==
- 2008: God for the Killing by Kain Massin
- 2007: Luck in the Greater West by Damian McDonald
- 2006: The Pilo Family Circus by Will Elliott
