= Cataract City =

Novel by Craig Davidson

- First edition
- Author: Craig Davidson
- Language: English
- Publisher: Doubleday
- Publication date: 2013
- Publication place: Canada
- ISBN: 978-0-385-6779-4-3

Cataract City is a 2013 novel by Craig Davidson published in Canada by Doubleday. The title refers to the city nickname of Niagara Falls and is derived from the Latin word for waterfalls.

== Summary ==
The novel is about two childhood friends, Duncan Diggs and Owen Stuckey, who grow up together in Niagara Falls. The novel alternates between their two perspectives.

In the present day, Duncan Diggs, released after eight years from a twenty-year sentence at the Kingston Penitentiary, calls his childhood friend Owen Stuckey to drive him back home to Niagara Falls. After dropping him off at his parents place, Owen goes to the woods and reminisces on their childhood friendship together which was based on their mutual hero-worship of a small-time wrestler named Bruiser Mahoney. After seeing Mahoney perform live one night, and meeting him briefly, the boys' fathers get into an altercation in the parking lot with some of their co-workers, the fathers of boys around their age who think that Duncan and his father cheated at a game of go-kart racing. While the police arrest the men Mahoney, who happened to be exiting the arena at the same time, takes the boys into his van with the intention of returning them home. Instead he becomes inebriated and takes them into the forest after learning they have never been camping before. His behaviour becomes increasingly erratic and he reveals his real name is Dade Rathburn and he is from Orillia before telling the boys that wrestling is fake. The next morning Owen and Duncan awake to find him dead and decide to try to follow the tracks of Bruiser's van through the forest in order to find their way home. The boys are lost in the woods for several days with nothing to eat, eventually meeting a vagrant who tries to sexually assault them. After frightening him away with a gun they took off of Mahoney's body they languish in the woods for one more day before discovering an isolated home. From there they are rescued and gradually drift apart from one another for a few years.

They later reunite as teenagers when Duncan discovers two abandoned greyhound puppies and decides to gift one to Owen. Their former baby sitter, Edwina Murphy, helps them bring the greyhounds to a racing track where they discover that Owen's pet, Fragrant Meat, can never be a racer while Duncan's pet, Dolly, is a gifted prodigy. As the boys spend more time at the race track they grow closer to Ed and she and Owen begin a relationship. Meanwhile, Owen becomes a star basketball player and begins to distance himself from Duncan again. Owen's basketball career is cut short when he is the victim of a hit and run perpetuated by Clyde Hillicker and Adam Lowery, the sons of the men who fought Owen and Duncan's fathers all those years ago. With his basketball career in ruins Owen goes to college to train as a police office. Meanwhile, Ed leaves him for Duncan and the two begin racing Dolly. Dolly moves her way up the race track but becomes grievously injured during a secret after hours race that Duncan participates in. He loses twenty thousand dollars to Lemmy Drinkwater and Dolly loses her leg.

As Duncan matures into adulthood he begins to bare knuckle box in an illegal ring run by Lemmy Drinkwater to supplement the meagre income he earns at the local cookie factory. When he is laid off he agrees to illegally smuggle cigarettes over the Canada–United States border for Lemmy. Shortly after the deal between Duncan and Lemmy is struck he receives a phone call from Owen who makes vague hints that he is being watched by the police. Duncan decides to go through with the deal anyway, however Igor Bearfoot, one of Lemmy's associates, believes he is a snitch and tries to choke him to death. Duncan saves himself by stabbing Igor with a box cutter. He is captured by Owen and forced to stand trial.

In prison, Duncan meets a man called Silas Garrow, a professional boxer from the Akwesasne reservation. The two become friends and Garrow teaches Duncan how to improve his boxing skills. In the present day, now that he has been released from prison, Duncan goes to Lemmy and asks him to arrange a fight between him and three men of his choosing. Lemmy arranges the fight and Duncan manages to beat the first two men with some difficulty. The third man is Silas Garrow, with whom Duncan had previously arranged a plan to throw the fight. After winning the fight Duncan manages to nearly bankrupt Lemmy with his winnings. Dissatisfied with his winnings Duncan, Owen and Silas come together to secretly record Lemmy discussing his cigarette smuggling business. However, before he can mention it he spots a police issued rifle that Silas is carrying and attempts to shoot him. Silas survives and Duncan and Owen follow Lemmy into the woods only to become grievously injured and lost. They pursue Lemmy for days eventually finding the old van Bruiser Mahoney kidnapped them in. Knowing that they are close to salvation they nevertheless make the wrong turn they made as boys and end up in the cave they found as children. There Lemmy reunites with them and after a scuffle in which Lemmy attempts to murder Duncan and Duncan shoots at Lemmy with Bruiser's old gun, Owen discovers that Lemmy is carrying a cellphone and calls for help.

In the final epilogue, we learn that all three men survived and that Duncan, suffering from brain-damage, has left Niagara Falls to pursue Ed and that Lemmy is in Attica.

== Reception ==
Cataract City was published to positive reviews. The National Post wrote of it as a "superb, thoughtful and thoroughly entertaining novel that is, page by page, mostly riveting, its prose flawless and its observations acute and, often touchingly sympathetic." Meanwhile The Globe and Mail praised Davidson as "one of [Canada]'s great kinetic writers."

== Awards and nominations ==
Cataract City was shortlisted for the 2013 Scotiabank Giller Prize.
