= Journeys with the Black Dog =

2007 anthology edited by Tessa Wigney, Kerrie Eyers and Gordon Parker

Journeys with the Black Dog: Inspirational Stories of Bringing Depression to Heel
- Editor: Tessa Wigney, Kerrie Eyers and Gordon Parker
- Genre: Anthology
- Publisher: Allen & Unwin
- Publication date: 2007
- Media type: Print
- Pages: 280 pp.
- ISBN: 9781741752649

Journeys with the Black Dog: Inspirational Stories of Bringing Depression to Heel is a 2007 anthology edited by Tessa Wigney, Kerrie Eyers and Gordon Parker from the Black Dog Institute at the University of NSW.

The book is a series of excerpts from submissions to a recent essay competition that examined how people live with major depression. The book contains a wide range of contributions from sufferers of depression.

The book won Human Rights and Equal Opportunity Commission award from the Black Dog Institute in Australia.

== See also ==
- 2007 in Australian literature
