= Rust and Bone =

2012 film directed by Jacques Audiard

- Theatrical release poster
- French: De rouille et d'os
- Directed by: Jacques Audiard
- Screenplay by: Jacques Audiard; Thomas Bidegain
- Based on: Rust and Bone by Craig Davidson
- Produced by: Jacques Audiard; Martine Cassinelli; Pascal Caucheteux; Alix Raynaud
- Starring: Marion Cotillard; Matthias Schoenaerts
- Cinematography: Stéphane Fontaine
- Edited by: Juliette Welfling
- Music by: Alexandre Desplat
- Production companies: Why Not Productions; Canal+; Ciné+; France Télévisions; Les Films du Fleuve
- Distributed by: UGC Distribution (France); Lumière (Benelux)
- Release dates: 17 May 2012 (France & Belgium)
- Running time: 123 minutes
- Countries: France; Belgium
- Language: French
- Budget: €15.5 million ($22 million)
- Box office: $25.8 million

Rust and Bone (French: De rouille et d'os) is a 2012 romantic drama film directed by Jacques Audiard, starring Marion Cotillard and Matthias Schoenaerts, based on Craig Davidson's 2005 short story collection Rust and Bone. It tells the story of a nightclub bouncer who falls in love with a woman who trains killer whales and loses her legs in a workplace accident. The film is a co-production between France and Belgium. It had its world premiere at the 2012 Cannes Film Festival where it competed for the Palme d'Or; it received positive early reviews and a ten-minute standing ovation at the end of its screening. The film was released theatrically in France and Belgium on 17 May 2012 through UGC Distribution and Lumière, respectively.

Rust and Bone received generally positive reviews from critics, especially for Cotillard's and Schoenaerts' performances. It was a critical and box office hit in France where it sold 1.9 million tickets, and was nominated for a Screen Actors Guild Award, two Golden Globes, two BAFTA Awards, five Lumière Awards, winning two; three Magritte Awards, and nine César Awards, winning four, including Most Promising Actor for Schoenaerts.

== Plot ==
Alain "Ali" van Versch, an unemployed single father in his twenties, arrives in Antibes to look for work to support his young son, Sam. Having no money, he crashes with his sister Anna, a cashier who already has her own share of problems with financial instability and temporary employment.

Ali gets a job as a bouncer in a nightclub, which allows him to continue his passion for kickboxing by training during the day. One evening, Ali meets Stéphanie after she is injured in a club brawl. He escorts her back to her home, where he learns she is an orca trainer at Marineland. Ali offers his phone number to Stéphanie before leaving. He later gets a new job as a security guard, where his co-worker Martial informs him of an illegal fighting racket where he can earn money in bouts.

At Marineland, Stéphanie suffers an accident during a show. She wakes up in the hospital to realize that her legs have been amputated. Now in a wheelchair and trying to adjust to life without her legs, Stéphanie is deeply depressed. She gives Ali a call. Ali visits her and takes her to a beach, where he persuades her to go swimming; though hesitant at first, Stéphanie eventually forgets her self-consciousness and is liberated by the experience.

Ali and Stéphanie begin to spend more time together, and her self-image improves. After she is outfitted with artificial limbs, she persists in learning to walk again. Stéphanie learns about Ali's involvement in mixed martial arts and has him bring her to watch his fights. After a frank discussion with Stéphanie, Ali offers to have sex with her to help her adjust to her new body. Their friendship evolves to include casual sex, though Stéphanie prevents deeper intimacy by forbidding kissing during their encounters.

On a night out with Ali and friends at the club where Ali formerly worked, Stéphanie feels rejected when Ali dances with another woman and goes home with her. A man at the bar tries to make a pass at Stéphanie, but stops short when he sees her prosthetic legs under her skirt. The man apologizes to her, prompting Stéphanie to fly into a rage and attack him. She is escorted from the club.

The next day, Stéphanie questions Ali about their relationship. She says that if they continue to have casual sex, they have to respect each other's feelings and be more discreet about their other involvements. Their intimacy increases and, one night Stéphanie lets down her guard and kisses Ali. Stéphanie also begins managing Ali's bets for his fighting when Martial leaves town.

Anna is fired from her job when the managers catch her taking home expired food products. Her co-workers tell her that Ali was found installing surveillance cameras at their work, as management wanted surveillance of employees' activities. Anna has a tense fight with her brother Ali, culminating in a standoff between him and her partner Richard, who demands that Ali leave Anna's flat and not come back.

Out of guilt for his offense, Ali leaves town without a word to Stéphanie. He leaves Sam with Anna in order to attend a combat sports training facility near Strasbourg. Some time later, Richard drops Sam off to visit Ali for a day at the training facility.

On their day together, Ali and Sam play in the snow and on a frozen lake. A weak spot on the ice beneath Sam cracks open and he falls into the lake. Ali frantically tries to rescue him, and after desperately punching the ice to break the surface, he is able to pull out the unconscious boy. In the process, Ali fractures almost every bone in his hands.

After carrying Sam to a hospital, Ali stays at the boy's side while he is in a coma. Sam ultimately survives the ordeal. Stéphanie, learning of Sam's accident, phones Ali at the hospital. While talking to Stéphanie, Ali breaks down in tears and confesses his love for her.

Ali explains that broken bones normally heal stronger than before, but he knows the pain will return in his hands.

After some time passes, Ali is shown celebrating a fight victory in Warsaw as Stéphanie happily watches. After the win, Ali and Stéphanie take Sam by the hand and lead him out through the revolving door of a hotel.

== Cast ==
- Marion Cotillard as Stéphanie
- Matthias Schoenaerts as Ali
- Armand Verdure as Sam
- Corinne Masiero as Anna
- Céline Sallette as Louise
- Bouli Lanners as Martial
- Mourad Frarema as Foued
- Jean-Michel Correia as Richard
- Yannick Choirat as Simon

== Production ==
=== Development ===
The project was announced by Variety on 7 September 2011. Director Jacques Audiard co-wrote the screenplay for Rust and Bone with Thomas Bidegain based on two short stories from Craig Davidson's 2005 short story collection of the same title, "Rust and Bone" and "Rocket Ride". The film was produced by Why Not Productions for €15.4 million. It was co-produced with France 2 Cinéma, Page 114 and the Belgian company Les Films du Fleuve.

To prepare for the role, Marion Cotillard took swimming lessons and spent a week at Marineland to learn how to direct whales. Explaining how the team adjusted to Stéphanie having no legs, Cotillard said: "When we did the first costume fitting, we had to try those pants that were empty of my legs and I had to fold my legs in the wheelchair. That image was so powerful that we kept it throughout the movie. And also we worked with amazing CGI guys."

The special effects were provided by French company Mikros Image. One of the key methods used was to have Cotillard wear green knee length socks. The legs below her knees were erased by computer or replaced with the image of prosthetic lower legs.

=== Filming ===
Filming started on 4 October 2011 and lasted eight weeks. Locations were used in Antibes, Cannes, Belgium, Île-de-France, northern France, Liège and Brussels.

== Release ==
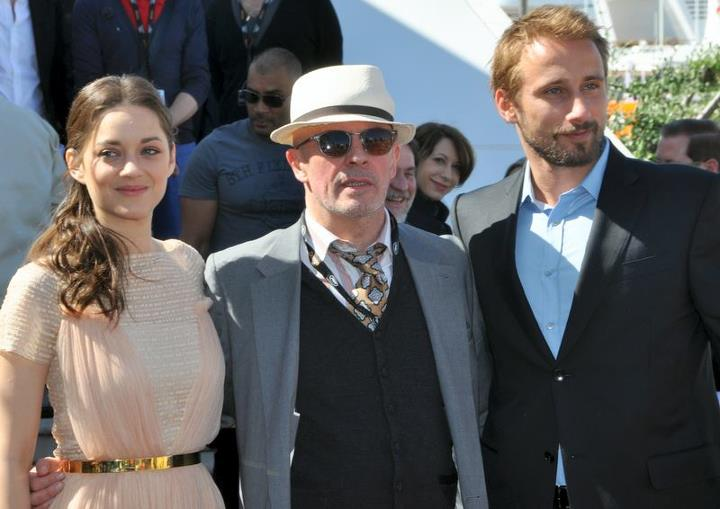
Marion Cotillard, Jacques Audiard, and Matthias Schoenaerts at the 2012 Cannes Film Festival.

The film premiered on 17 May 2012 in competition at the 65th Cannes Film Festival, where it received rave reviews and a ten-minute standing ovation at the end of its screening. It was released theatrically the same day in France and Belgium through UGC Distribution and Lumière, respectively. StudioCanal UK acquired the British distribution rights, and the film was released in the UK on 2 November 2012. It opened in the United States through Sony Pictures Classics on 23 November 2012.

=== Critical reception ===
The film was screened at the 2012 Cannes Film Festival and received early positive critical reactions. Rotten Tomatoes gives the film a score of 82% based on 167 reviews, with a weighted average of 7.5/10. The site's critical consensus states, "Surging on strong performances from Marion Cotillard and Matthias Schoenaerts, Rust and Bone is as vibrant and messily unpredictable as life itself." Metacritic gave the film a rating of 73/100, based on 39 reviews.

HitFix praised Audiard "for the way he takes melodramatic convention and bends it to his own particular sensibility, delivering a powerful tale about the reminders we all carry of the pains that have formed us" and found Cotillard's work "incredible, nuanced and real."

Peter Bradshaw of The Guardian gave the film a four-star rating out of five, writing Rust and Bone is "a passionate and moving love story which surges out of the screen like a flood tide" and "its candour and force are matched by the commitment and intelligence of its two leading players."

Time's Mary Corliss found that the romance is "sometimes engrossing, sometimes exasperating" and that the cinematography recalls Kings Row and An Affair to Remember." Corliss also wrote, "Schoenaerts exudes masculinity that is both effortless and troubled" while "Cotillard demonstrates again her eerie ability to write complex feelings on her face, as if from the inside, without grandstanding her emotions" and added, "her strong, subtle performance is gloriously winning on its own."

Michael Phillips of the Chicago Tribune thought Schoenaerts' sensitive-brute instincts recall Marlon Brando and Tom Hardy.

Critic A. O. Scott of The New York Times called the film "a strong, emotionally replete experience, and also a tour de force of directorial button pushing."

Roger Ebert, who did not review the film upon its original release, later gave it four stars in February 2013 and said it was the latest title in his "Great Movies" collection. However, Ebert's illness and subsequent death in April 2013 prevented him from adding the film to the list.

James Kaelan of MovieMaker wrote: "Besides Emmanuelle Riva in Amour (2012) and Isidora Simijonovic in Clip (2012), I would argue strongly that no actress gave a better performance in 2012 than Cotillard in Rust and Bone, and it was a travesty she wasn't nominated for an Academy Award."

=== Industry reception ===
Cate Blanchett wrote a review for Variety praising Marion Cotillard's performance in the film, describing it as "simply astonishing", stating that "Marion has created a character of nobility and candour, seamlessly melding herself into a world we could not have known without her. Her performance is as unexpected and as unsentimental and raw as the film itself."

=== Box office ===
In France, Rust and Bone was released to 394 screens, where it debuted at number one at the box office and sold a total of 1,930.536 million tickets. The film grossed a total of $25.8 million worldwide.

== Awards and nominations ==
List of accolades
Award / Film Festival	Category	Recipient(s)	Result	Ref.
Cannes Film Festival	Palme d'Or	Jacques Audiard	Nominated	
César Awards	Best Film	Jacques Audiard	Nominated	
César Awards	Best Director	Jacques Audiard	Nominated	
César Awards	Best Actress	Marion Cotillard	Nominated	
César Awards	Most Promising Actor	Matthias Schoenaerts	Won	
César Awards	Best Adapted Screenplay	Jacques Audiard and Thomas Bidegain	Won	
César Awards	Best Original Score	Alexandre Desplat	Won	
César Awards	Best Cinematography	Stéphane Fontaine	Nominated	
César Awards	Best Editing	Juliette Welfling	Won	
César Awards	Best Sound	Brigitte Taillandier, Pascal Villard and Jean-Paul Hurier	Nominated	
Étoiles d'Or	Best Film	Jacques Audiard	Won	
Étoiles d'Or	Best Actress	Marion Cotillard	Won	
Étoiles d'Or	Best Male Newcomer	Matthias Schoenaerts	Won	
Étoiles d'Or	Best Screenplay	Jacques Audiard and Thomas Bidegain	Won	
Globes de Cristal Award	Best Film	Jacques Audiard	Won	
Globes de Cristal Award	Best Actress	Marion Cotillard	Won	
AACTA Awards	Best International Actress	Marion Cotillard	Nominated	
BFI London Film Festival	Best Film	Jacques Audiard	Won	
Lumière Awards	Best Director	Jacques Audiard	Won	
Lumière Awards	Best Screenplay	Jacques Audiard and Thomas Bidegain	Won	
Lumière Awards	Best Actress	Marion Cotillard	Nominated	
Lumière Awards	Best Actor	Matthias Schoenaerts	Nominated	
Lumière Awards	Best Film	Jacques Audiard	Nominated	
British Independent Film Awards	Best International Independent Film	Rust and Bone	Nominated	
British Academy of Film and Television Arts	Best Actress in a Leading Role	Marion Cotillard	Nominated	
British Academy of Film and Television Arts	Best Film Not in the English Language	Rust and Bone	Nominated	
Broadcast Film Critics Association	Best Actress	Marion Cotillard	Nominated	
Broadcast Film Critics Association	Best Foreign Language Film	Rust and Bone	Nominated	
Cabourg Film Festival	Best Film	Jacques Audiard	Won	
Crested Butte Film Festival	Best Narrative Feature	Jacques Audiard	Won	
Chlotrudis Awards	Best Actress	Marion Cotillard	Nominated	
Chlotrudis Awards	Best Actor	Matthias Schoenaerts	Nominated	
Chlotrudis Awards	Best Director	Jacques Audiard	Nominated	
David di Donatello Awards	Best European Film	Jacques Audiard	Nominated	
Golden Trailer Awards	Best Foreign TV Spot – For "Sexy Action"	Rust and Bone	Won	
Golden Trailer Awards	Best Foreign TV Spot – For "Reviews TV:30"	Rust and Bone	Nominated	
Hawaii International Film Festival	Best Actress	Marion Cotillard	Won	
Hawaii International Film Festival	Best Film	Jacques Audiard	Nominated	
Irish Film and Television Awards	Best International Actress	Marion Cotillard	Won	
Chicago Film Critics Association	Best Foreign-Language Film	Rust and Bone	Nominated	
Golden Globe Awards	Best Foreign Language Film	Rust and Bone	Nominated	
Golden Globe Awards	Best Actress – Motion Picture Drama	Marion Cotillard	Nominated	
Golden Reel Awards	Best Sound Editing: Sound Effects, Foley, Dialogue and ADR in an Animation Feature Film	Rust and Bone	Won	
Goya Awards	Best European Film		Nominated	
Hollywood Film Festival	Best Actress of the Year	Marion Cotillard	Won	
Sant Jordi Awards	Best Foreign Actress	Marion Cotillard	Won	
Online Film Critics Society Awards	Best Film Not in the English Language	Rust and Bone	Nominated	
Dublin Film Critics Circle	Best Film	Rust and Bone	Nominated	
Dublin Film Critics Circle	Best Actress	Marion Cotillard	Nominated	
Dublin Film Critics Circle	Best Actor	Matthias Schoenaerts	Nominated	
Rembrandt Awards	Best International Actress	Marion Cotillard	Nominated	
North Carolina Film Critics Association	Best Foreign Language Film	Jacques Audiard	Nominated	
Georgia Film Critics Association	Best Film	Jacques Audiard	Nominated	
Georgia Film Critics Association	Best Foreign Film	Jacques Audiard	Nominated	
Georgia Film Critics Association	Best Actress	Marion Cotillard	Nominated	
Georgia Film Critics Association	Best Actor	Matthias Schoenaerts	Nominated	
Georgia Film Critics Association	Best Adapted Screenplay	Jacques Audiard and Thomas Bidegain	Nominated	
Houston Film Critics Society	Best Foreign Language Film	Rust and Bone	Nominated	
Independent Spirit Awards	Best International Film	Rust and Bone	Nominated	
London Film Critics' Circle	Foreign Language Film of the Year	Rust and Bone	Won	
London Film Critics' Circle	Technical Achievement Award	Alexandre Desplat (music)	Nominated	
Magritte Awards	Best Actor	Matthias Schoenaerts	Nominated	
Magritte Awards	Best Foreign Film in Coproduction	Rust and Bone	Nominated	
Magritte Awards	Best Supporting Actor	Bouli Lanners	Won	
Screen Actors Guild Awards	Outstanding Performance by a Female Actor in a Leading Role	Marion Cotillard	Nominated	
Telluride Film Festival	Silver Medallion	Marion Cotillard	Won	
Valladolid International Film Festival	Best Actor	Matthias Schoenaerts	Won	
Valladolid International Film Festival	Best Director	Jacques Audiard	Won	
Valladolid International Film Festival	Best Screenplay	Craig Davidson, Thomas Bidegain, Jacques Audiard	Won	
International Cinephile Society	Best Film Not on the English Language	Rust and Bone	Nominated	
International Cinephile Society	Best Actress (Runner-up)	Marion Cotillard	Won	
International Cinephile Society	Best Adapted Screenplay	Jacques Audiard and Thomas Bidegain	Nominated	
Vancouver Film Critics Circle	Best Actress	Marion Cotillard	Nominated	
Visual Effects Society Awards	Outstanding Supporting Visual Effects in a Feature Motion Picture	Béatrice Bauwens, Cédric Fayolle, Nicolas Rey, Stéphane Thibert	Nominated	
Washington D.C. Area Film Critics Association Awards	Best Actress	Marion Cotillard	Nominated	
Washington D.C. Area Film Critics Association Awards	Best Foreign Language Film	Rust and Bone	Nominated	
World Soundtrack Awards	Soundtrack Composer of the Year	Alexandre Desplat	Nominated	

== See also ==
- 2012 in film
- Cinema of France
- Cinema of Belgium
- Disability in the arts
- List of mixed martial arts films
- List of films featuring mental disorders
