= Kain Massin =

Australian writer of speculative fiction

- Writing career
- Period: 1998–present
- Genre: Speculative fiction

Kain Massin is an Australian writer of speculative fiction.

== Biography ==
Massin is based in Adelaide, South Australia where he is a high school maths and science teacher. He is also a member of the Blackwood Writers Group. Massin's first work was published in 1998 with his short story "Escape from Stalingrad" which was featured in fourth edition of Harbinger. "Escape from Stalingrad" was nominated for the 1999 Aurealis Award for best horror short story but lost to Sean Williams and Simon Brown's "Atrax". In 2008 Massin's first novel was published by ABC Books, entitled God for the Killing, after he won the 2008 ABC Fiction Award which has a A$10,000 prize and a publication deal for the novel.

== Awards and nominations ==
Year	Award	Work	Category	Result
1999	Aurealis Award	"Escape from Stalingrad"	Best horror short story	Nomination
2008	ABC Fiction Award	God for the Killing	—	Won

== Bibliography ==
=== Anthologies ===
As editor

- Tales from the Black Wood (2006, co-editor)

=== Novels ===
- God for the Killing (2008)

=== Short stories ===
- "Escape from Stalingrad" (1998) in Harbinger #4
- "Wrong Dreaming" (2000) in On Spec Fall 2000 (ed. Jena Snyder)
- "A Guide for the Grave-Robber" (2000) in Altair #5 (ed. Robert N. Stephenson, Jim Deed, Andrew Collings)
