= Nicolette Stasko =

Australian-American writer (1950–2021)

Nicolette Stasko (1950 – 25 December 2021) was an Australian-American poet, novelist and non-fiction writer.

Stasko was born in Johnstown, Pennsylvania, to Polish and Hungarian parents. She completed a BA with honours in English at Pennsylvania State University and an MA in education at Lehigh University then taught in special education. Marrying an Australian in 1978 she travelled in Europe and Asia settling in Perth, Western Australia where she taught at Perth Modern School. She separated from her husband, meeting the writer David Brooks with whom she has a daughter. In 1986 they moved to Brisbane where she taught and edited The Phoenix Review. During this period she began writing in earnest and had her first poetry published in Australia in the journal Hecate.

Stasko's first collection of poems, Abundance (1992), won the 1993 Anne Elder Award and she has since published several collections to widespread critical acclaim. She has also published a non-fiction book entitled Oyster: From Montparnasse to Greenwell Point (2000) and most recently the novel The Invention of Everyday Life (2007).

Stasko died of cancer on 25 December 2021.

== Bibliography ==
Poetry

- Abundance. (Angus & Robertson, 1992) ISBN 0-207-17671-X
- Black Night with Windows. (Angus & Robertson, 1994) ISBN 0-207-18659-6
- Dwelling in the Shape of Things. (1999)
- In Certain Light. (2001)
- The Weight of Irises. (Black Pepper, 2003) ISBN 1-876044-39-X Excerpt
- Glass Cathedrals: New and Selected Poems. (Salt, 2006) ISBN 978-1-84471-276-2 Excerpt

Novels

- The Invention of Everyday Life. (Black Pepper, 2007) ISBN 978-1-876044-56-5 Excerpt

Non-fiction

- Oyster: From Montparnasse to Greenwell Point. (HarperCollins, 2000) ISBN 0-7322-6802-8 ISBN 0732270901 (paperback)
