= The Troop (book) =

2014 novel by Nick Cutter

- First edition hardcover
- Author: Nick Cutter
- Audio read by: Corey Brill
- Language: English
- Genre: Horror
- Publisher: Gallery Books
- Publication date: 2014
- Publication place: United States
- Media type: Print (hardback, paperback) e-book audiobook
- Pages: 368 pages
- ISBN: 9781476717715 First edition hardcover

The Troop is a 2014 horror novel written by Canadian author Craig Davidson under the pen name Nick Cutter. The novel was released in English in hardback, e-book, and audiobook on February 25, 2014, through Gallery Books. The following year, it won the inaugural James Herbert Award for Horror Writing.

The novel follows a troop of Boy Scouts who must deal with not only the threats posed by killer tapeworms, but also the homicidal and sociopathic tendencies of one of their own.

== Synopsis ==
The Troop follows the story of five teenage boys and their Scoutmaster as they spend a weekend away on the remote Falstaff Island. The troop consists of Scoutmaster Tim Riggs (a single middle-aged man and the town physician), Ephraim (nicknamed Eef, a boy prone to violent outbursts), Max (a mild mannered boy and best friend of Ephraim), Newt (a quiet, "nerdy" boy who is quite intelligent), Kent (a bold and tenacious boy prone to forcing his leadership among others), and Shelley (a deeply disturbed psychopathic boy).

On the first evening of the trip, Tim notices a boat arriving on the island and encounters a stranger who, upon inspection, is malnourished but non-threatening. The stranger tells Tim that he needs help and is ravenously hungry. Tim allows the man to rest on the couch inside for the night, but not before telling the boys to stay in their room.

Tim attempts to hail help on the radio when he is set upon by the stranger, who vomits a kind of sludge onto Tim. Tim manages to subdue the man and the next day, Tim sends the boys off on a hike, remarking that he is hungry. He finds that the stranger had arrived on a motorboat, but that the spark plugs needed to operate his boat were missing.

On the hike, the boys see a black military helicopter above them, which circles the island before returning to the mainland. When they get back to the cabin, Tim mentions that he's lost at least 25 pounds since the previous evening. He asks Max (specifically since the boy's father is the local mortician) to help him operate on the stranger. After they cut open the stranger's stomach, a giant white worm bursts from the open wound and strangles the stranger to death. Tim kills the worm and both Tim and Max leave the cabin after Tim drinks some alcohol, infecting it with the worms.

Kent, intent on defying Tim's orders to not interfere with the corpse, goes to inspect the cabin. Kent seizes this opportunity to wrest power from the infected Tim and convinces the troop to lock him in a closet. Shelley encourages Kent to have a "victory sip" of the infected whiskey and the boys sleep outside for the night.

When the boys wake up, they notice that Kent is infected and Ephraim forcefully secludes him from the group. The teens camp out in the cabin cellar and overnight Tim is killed by a tree that collapsed on the side of the cabin he was locked in. His corpse is infested with the worms.

Shelley hides and uses a radio to manipulate the uninfected but paranoid Ephraim into believing he's infected and torments and drowns the completely disfigured Kent in the ocean, resulting in Shelley becoming infected. Shelley's manipulation of Ephraim cause him to cut himself open with his knife, looking for worms inside of him. Newt and Max survey the island unaware of this. The three teens return to Shelley's location and overnight Shelley burns Ephraim alive.

Newt and Max decide to find the spark plugs from the strangers' boat having realized he ate them, but Shelley steals the spark plugs and has a fight with the pair resulting in Newt's infection and Shelley's death.

Max and Newt escape on the now working boat but are stopped by soldiers. Newt is killed after revealing he was infected leaving only Max as the survivor. Max finds he is unable to live life normally as everyone now treats him differently.

The ending is up to interpretation, with the final passage remarking that Max is returning to the now charred and desolate island on a stolen boat, with a deep "hunger" inside of him.

During the story, each chapter is intercut with various reports and interviews revealing that a brilliant yet psychopathic scientist named Dr. Clive Edgerton was working on a modified tapeworm that could rapidly but safely cause weight loss. Edgerton had been using the stranger who arrived on the island (whose name is revealed to be Thomas Padgett) as a human test subject for the worms before he escaped and travelled to Falstaff Island. Edgerton had also started to accept grants from military agencies hoping to use the parasites in warfare, with Falstaff Island being used as a testing site.

== Release ==
The Troop was released in hardback through Galley Books in the United States on February 25, 2014, alongside an audiobook adaptation narrated by Corey Brill. A mass-market paperback edition by Pocket Books was released in July of that year and Gallery Books issued a larger paperback in 2016.

It has since been released in French, Hungarian, and Chinese.

== Film adaptation ==
In August 2019 Deadline reported that film rights to The Troop were optioned by James Wan’s Atomic Monster. E.L. Katz has been named as director, while Wan and Michael Clear will serve as producers. Noah Gardner and Aidan Fitzgerald have been picked as the film's screenwriters.

In August 2026, development restarted with the film now under Paramount Primal and Lyrical Media. The new screenwriter is Chris Basler.

== Reception ==
The Troop has received positive reviews from outlets such as the Quill and Quire and National Post, the latter of which included a satirical review from Davidson praising the book. The book has been favorably compared to Stephen King's Carrie for its use of "extratextual materials, including newspaper articles, interviews and the like, to supplement the narrative", which Davidson has cited as an inspiration.

Tor.com's Niall Alexander also compared the work to Carrie and criticized the characters as "broadly characterised" and stating that "This whisper is what The Troop tries and I’m afraid fails to trade in. Instead, Cutter must make do with revulsion, but it’s no substitute, ultimately. A twisted coming of age tale, more Koryta than King, which I quite liked despite its disappointing dependence on disgust." Publishers Weekly had similar criticisms, writing "Competent prose makes up in part for stock characters—the nerd, the popular kid, the quiet psychotic. Cutter’s appeal to modern-day disquiet over the ethical lapses of the military-industrial complex will strike many as pro forma rather than based in any authentic outrage over abuses real or imagined."

=== Awards ===
- James Herbert Award for Horror Writing (2015, won)
