= The House of Balthus =

1995 novel by David Brooks

- The House of Balthus first edition cover.
- Author: David Brooks
- Language: English
- Genre: Fantasy, horror
- Publisher: Allen & Unwin
- Publication date: 1 October 1995
- Publication place: Australia
- Media type: Print (Paperback)
- Pages: 204 pp (first edition)
- ISBN: 1-86373-912-2

The House of Balthus is a 1995 fantasy, horror novel by David Brooks. It is a story about characters from a painting by Balthus who have walked out to inhabit an ancient chateau.

== Background ==
The House of Balthus was first published in Australia on 1 October 1995 by Allen & Unwin in trade paperback format. In 1996 it was released in Australia in mass market paperback format and in 1997 it was released as an audiobook on tape by Louis Braille Books. It has also been released in German and Polish. The House of Balthus was shortlisted for the 1995 Aurealis Award for best fantasy novel and best horror novel but lost to Garth Nix's Sabriel and Terry Dowling's An Intimate Knowledge of the Night respectively. It was also a shortlist nominee for the 1996 National Book Council Banjo Award.
