= Rust and Bone (short story collection) =

2005 book by Craig Davidson

First edition

Rust and Bone is a collection of short stories by Canadian author Craig Davidson, first published in 2005 by Viking Canada. Four of the short stories were published in the Canadian literary magazines Event, Prairie Fire and The Fiddlehead before being collected in a single work. The 2012 film Rust and Bone was adapted from one of the stories.

== Short stories ==
Rust and Bone includes eight short stories. Although most of the stories stand alone, a few are loosely connected. James Paris, the main character of "A Mean Utility", also appears in "On Sleepless Roads". "On Sleepless Roads" makes reference to an event that took place in "Rocket Ride".

- "Rust and Bone" – A 37-year-old chicano boxer raised in a U.S. border town recounts the life that led him towards boxing.
- "The Rifleman" – In St. Catharines, an abusive alcoholic lives vicariously through his teenage son who he believes is a basketball prodigy.
- "A Mean Utility" – A Toronto couple with difficulty conceiving a child raise and train pitbulls to fight in an illegal dogfighting ring.
- "Rocket Ride" – An orca whale trainer in Niagara Falls sustains a life-threatening injury in the middle of one of his performances and struggles to deal with the aftermath.
- "On Sleepless Roads" – A night in the life of a repo man whose wife is suffering from Bradykinesia.
- "Friction" – A sex addict finds solace working in the porn industry after his life and marriage fall apart.
- "Life in the Flesh" – After accidentally killing an opponent during a fight, a Canadian boxer moves to Thailand and trains problematic rookies there.
- "The Apprentice's Guide to Modern Magic" – Two siblings in their 30s take a road trip across Southern Ontario to track down the magician father who abandoned them 25 years before.

== Adaptations ==
French director Jacques Audiard adapted Rust and Bone into a film in 2012. The adaptation stars Matthias Schoenaerts and Marion Cotillard. The script merged two unconnected short stories, "Rust and Bone" and "Rocket Ride", and moved the setting from Canada to France. Additionally, the principal character of "Rocket Ride" was changed to a woman.
