= The Fern Tattoo =

2007 novel by David Brooks

- Author: David Brooks
- Language: English
- Genre: Novel
- Publisher: University of Queensland Press, Australia
- Publication date: 2007
- Publication place: Australia
- Media type: Print (Paperback)
- Pages: 374 pp
- ISBN: 978-0-7022-3626-6
- OCLC: 173655618
- Dewey Decimal: A823.3 22
- LC Class: PR9619.3.B715 F47 2007

The Fern Tattoo is a 2007 novel by the Australian author David Brooks.

== Dedication ==
"To my daughter Jessica"

== Plot summary ==
Benedict's mother has recently died; after the funeral, he receives a phone call from Mrs. Darling, a friend of his mother's. Benedict visits the old woman in the countryside, where she tells him various tales that involve three generations of families. He spends the next several years visiting Mrs. Darling, rearranging his personal plans, so he can visit her more often. One day, he receives a phone call that Mrs. Darling is dying. He finally learns that the stories she has been telling him have been about his own family.

== Epigraph ==
"Yes, man is broad, too broad indeed. I'd have him narrower." - Dmitri Fyodorovitch Karamazov: The Brothers Karamazov, Fyodor Dostoevsky

== Awards ==
- Miles Franklin Literary Award, 2008: shortlisted
