= Caleb Lewis (playwright) =

Australian playwright and game designer

- Born: 16 April 1978
- Occupations: Playwright and game designer

Caleb Lewis is an Australian playwright and game designer, born on 16 April 1978. He is known for his play Dogfall, first produced in 2007 in Adelaide, South Australia.

== Early life and education ==
Lewis' father was a diver, whose job at one time was to retrieve bodies from the Yarra River in Melbourne. He later worked on an oil rig near Dubai, where Lewis visited him when he was 22.

Lewis studied drama and playwriting at the Flinders University Drama Centre earning a Bachelor of Creative Arts (Hons) in 2001. After this he was mentored by Australian dramatist Nick Enright.

== Career ==
In 2004 Lewis' collection of short plays Songs for the Deaf was produced by FreshTrack Productions for the Adelaide Fringe Festival. He began a two-year residency with the Griffin Theatre Company, culminating in the world premiere of Nailed.

Lewis has completed commissions for Jigsaw Theatre Company in the Australian Capital Territory and Riverland Youth Theatre Company in South Australia. His short film Half Windsor, directed by Sophie Miller, opened in Sydney in May 2007.

After receiving funding from the Australia Council's theatre and literature boards, his play The Sea Bride won the Theatrelab Emerging Playwright Award, earning a two-week workshop with playwright Edward Albee.

His play Dogfall opened in Adelaide at the Bakehouse Theatre to good reviews in November 2007, and Edward Albee called the play "wonderful". It was shortlisted for the 2008 Philip Parsons Young Playwrights Award.

In January 2008, Songs for the Deaf toured to Hong Kong. Men, Love and the Monkeyboy was short-listed for the 2007 Griffin Award and is the winner of the 2008 Mitch Matthews award. Men, Love and the Monkeyboy enjoyed successful seasons at the Darlinghurst Theatre and the Riverside Theatre Parramatta in 2008.

Rust and Bone, based on Craig Davidson's short story collection of the same name, premiered in Sydney in 2013, earning favourable reviews. Lewis began to work on creating immersive theatre pieces and game-based stories. His work If There Was a Colour Darker Than Black I’d Wear It won the 2013 Ruby Award for Innovation.

In 2016 he developed an app called The City, which allows the player to explore the lives of four homeless characters.

In 2019 he developed A Little History Play for the Batch Festival at Griffin Theatre Company. This was an interactive piece where the audience guided the action in the play, and their decisions then carried over to the play's next performance.

Cathedral, commissioned by the State Theatre Company of South Australia (STCSA) and staged by the in May 2022, attracted good reviews, with one reviewer calling it the highlight of STCSA's season. The play centres around a cave diver diving in a cave near Mount Gambier, and explores themes of depression, drawn from the playwright's own experience of the condition. Lewis wrote in the program notes that it also reflected on the impact of the COVID-19 pandemic on people's personal lives. One reviewer said it was about helplessness, hope and salvation. Nathan O'Keefe took the central role in the one-hander, and it was directed by Shannon Rush.

Lewis moved to Queensland in May 2022.

== Recognition and awards ==
- 2003: Winner of the Naked Theatre Company's Write Now competition for RocketBaby
- 2004: Nailed, shortlisted for the Philip Parsons Young Playwrights Award
- 2007: Men, Love and the Monkeyboy, shortlisted for the Griffin Award
- 2008: Dogfall, shortlisted for the Philip Parsons Young Playwrights Award
- 2008: Men, Love and the Monkeyboy, winner of the Mitch Matthews Award
- 2008: Inaugural winner of the Australian Writers Guild's 2008 Interactive Media AWGIE for his work on Otzi – The Story of the Iceman
- 2009: Death in Bowengabbie nominated for best stage production at the 2009 Adelaide Fringe Festival, winning a commendation for best writing
- 2010: Inaugural winner of Sally Burton's Richard Burton Award for New Plays, for Clinchfield
- 2010: Lewis turned down the prestigious Philip Parsons Award, in protest against the lack of gender diversity in the company's 2010 season
- 2013: South Australian Ruby Award for Innovation, for If There Was a Colour Darker Than Black I’d Wear It.
- 2023: Cathedral, shortlisted for Nick Enright Prize for Playwriting, New South Wales Premier's Literary Awards

== Other roles ==
Lewis is a partner of the Hunter Institute for Mental Health.

== Selected works ==
- The River at the End of the Road
- Destroyer of Worlds
- The Honey Bees
- Maggie Stone
- Nailed
- Dogfall
- Death in Bowengabbie,
- Rust and Bone *Aleksander and the Robot Maid
- In a Dark Dark Wood
- Clinchfield (winner of the inaugural Richard Burton Award for new plays)
- Cathedral, produced at the Space Theatre in the Adelaide Festival Centre in May 2022 by the State Theatre Company of South Australia
