= The Pilo Family Circus =

2007 horror novel by Will Elliott

- First edition
- Author: Will Elliott
- Language: English
- Genre: Horror
- Publisher: ABC Books
- Publication date: October 2006
- Publication place: Australia
- Media type: Print (Hardback & paperback)
- Pages: 312 pp (first edition)
- ISBN: 0-7333-1981-5

The Pilo Family Circus is a 2006 horror novel by Australian author Will Elliott.

== Premise ==
It follows the story of Jamie, who, after a random incident of nearly hitting a clown with his car, finds himself being stalked by three sadistic clowns.

== Background ==
The Pilo Family Circus was first published in Australia in October 2006 by ABC Books in trade paperback format after winning the inaugural ABC Fiction Award. It has also been released in an audio edition by ABC Audio; in 2007 it was released in the United Kingdom, Germany, Italy, Sweden, Spain, and Russia, and in 2009 it was released in the United States. In 2011, the Spanish edition won the Nocte Award for Best International Book. A stage play based on the book was performed in 2012 by the Godlight Theater Company.

== Awards ==
- ABC Fiction Award 2006, winner
- Aurealis Award for Best Horror Novel 2006, winner
- Golden Aurealis Award for Best Novel 2006, winner
- Australian Shadows Award 2006, winner
- Ditmar Award for Best Novel 2007, winner
- International Horror Guild Award for Best Novel 2007, shortlisted

== See also ==
- 2006 in Australian literature

== External ==
- The Pilo Family Circus title listing at the Internet Speculative Fiction Database
