= K-Machines =

2006 novel by Damien Broderick

- First edition cover.
- Author: Damien Broderick
- Cover artist: Getty Images
- Language: English
- Series: Players in the Contest of Worlds
- Genre: Science fiction
- Publisher: Thunder's Mouth Press
- Publication date: February 22, 2006
- Publication place: United States
- Media type: Print (Paperback)
- Pages: 336 (first edition)
- ISBN: 978-1-56025-805-6
- Preceded by: Godplayers

K-Machines is a 2006 science fiction novel by Australian writer Damien Broderick. It is the sequel to Broderick's 2005 novel Godplayers. It follows the story of August Seebeck who is empowered with a killing device and finds himself moving world to world in a brutal and confusing game.

== Background ==
K-Machines was first published in the United States on February 22, 2006 by Thunder's Mouth Press in trade paperback format. It won the 2006 Aurealis Award for best science fiction novel.
