= Vietnam: The Australian War =

2007 non-fiction book by Paul Ham

- Author: Paul Ham
- Language: English
- Subject: Australian politics, Australian history, Australian involvement in Vietnam, Australian foreign policy
- Genre: Historical nonfiction
- Published: 2007
- Publisher: HarperCollins
- Publication place: Australia
- ISBN: 9780732282370
- Dewey Decimal: 959.7043394

Vietnam, The Australian War is a 2007 non-fiction book (ISBN 9780732282370) written by Australian author and historian Paul Ham. The book is a comprehensive history of the First and Second Indochinese wars, written from a predominantly Australian point of view, namely, the First Indochina War and the Vietnam War. It sets the Australian involvement in the war in Vietnam in the context of the American and Vietnamese experiences. The book examines the impact of Australian and American relations on military decisions, the relationship between the two countries' governments, and the aftermath of the war. The author draws on voluminous sources, many of them recently declassified, and recounts the history of Indochina as far back as about 3,000 years.

The book has been used in Australian state school curriculums and in Australian government affairs. Vietnam: The Australian War won the 2008 NSW Premier's Prize for Australian History and was shortlisted for the Walkley Award for Non-Fiction. The book was used as a source for the Screen Australia 2011 Documentary All The Way. "The book is the soldiers' story of deployment in an ideological war."

== Background ==
The book was first published November 2007 by the HarperCollins Australian publishing house. Funding from the LBJ Library was provided to the author as a research grant for the book's American material. The book draws heavily on hundreds of interviews with Australian veteran servicemen that were conducted in person, by post, telephone and email by the author and the Australian Defence Force. The latter had been kept secret since they were taken almost thirty years previously. Ham also interviewed North Vietnamese veterans and former Vietcong soldiers, during several visits to Vietnam; as well as relying on interviews with Viet Cong prisoners taken by Australian intelligence agents during the conflict. Ham has said the book acts as ‘narrative history’ because it looks into the repercussions of war and “has the story of individuals; human beings subjected to shocking circumstances”.

== Description ==
The book consists of 8 parts, beginning from the military and social history of Vietnam, to the aftermath of the Second Indochinese War. The Australian perspective is intermingled with the observations of American soldiers, diplomats and Viet Cong soldiers and Vietnamese refugees.

=== Part 1 ===
Part One ‘The Place’ first covers Vietnam’s traditionally long and successful history of guerrilla warfare, which Ham notes as a major influence for General Giap's tactics during the First and Second Indochinese wars. Vietnam's extensive history of invasion and colonialism lead way for a deep longing for nationhood and independence among the people, especially among the peasants in the rice fields, who made up majority of the nation's population. Ham details the history of the Vietnamese as close, inward facing conservative people, and reasons this and the brutal French political conditions as a major factor for their immediate resistance to foreign occupation. The mistreatment of peasants during French colonial rule brought a wave of Nationalist and eventually Communist support among the people in the 1930s that led to the defeat of France in the First Indochina War. The author writes that the strength of Ho Chi Minh and Giap's popularity in Vietnam helped to increase the fear of red China in Australia. Ham asserts that the subsequent 1955 Labor Party Split secured the NLP power and foreign policy in the continuing years.

=== Part 2 ===
Part Two ‘First Contacts’ covers the establishment of Australia's foreign relationship with the US stemming from World War 2 and the collapse of European colonialism in the East. Losing the European market through the disassociation from Britain meant turning to the United States, a goal achieved if they provided military assistance in return. Ham examines the role of Colonel Ted Serong, the Australian advisor for CIA operations in Vietnam, in understanding and relaying the tactics of jungle warfare. He writes that Prime Minister Robert Menzies' 1965 declaration promising Australian troops to the South Vietnamese forces was warned against by senior advisors, and was a public act of US support. Ham notes that South Vietnamese Prime Minister Phan Huy Quát had not asked for soldiers, and it wasn't until the announcement that Menzies asked him. The book details the more cautious tactics learnt from Australia's experience at Kokoda and Malaya, despite American views that they “…seemed timid, over-cautious, slow and ineffective.” It goes on to note the more conspicuous American uniforms, better living conditions and pay than their Australian comrades.

=== Part 3 ===
Part 3 ‘The Australian province’ covers the lottery-like system of conscription for young men, called ‘Nashos’ and its unpopularity among the public, who viewed it as an insult to the ANZAC legacy. The author writes that the lack of Government strategy led Australian Commanders to conduct operations as they saw fit. It outlines the role of the Government in appeasing the public through the Rules of Engagement, which ordered civil conduct from the Australian forces, despite paying little regard for soldier safety and playing to politicians' sensitivities. Ham details the role of the Battle of Long Tan being reported by both the media and Government as a pre-planned victory despite being a surprised Viet Cong attack. Ham goes on to report the refusal to award the soldiers from the battle as the beginning of their resentment towards the Australian Government, though their efforts were recognised and awarded by both the US and South Vietnam.

=== Part 4 ===
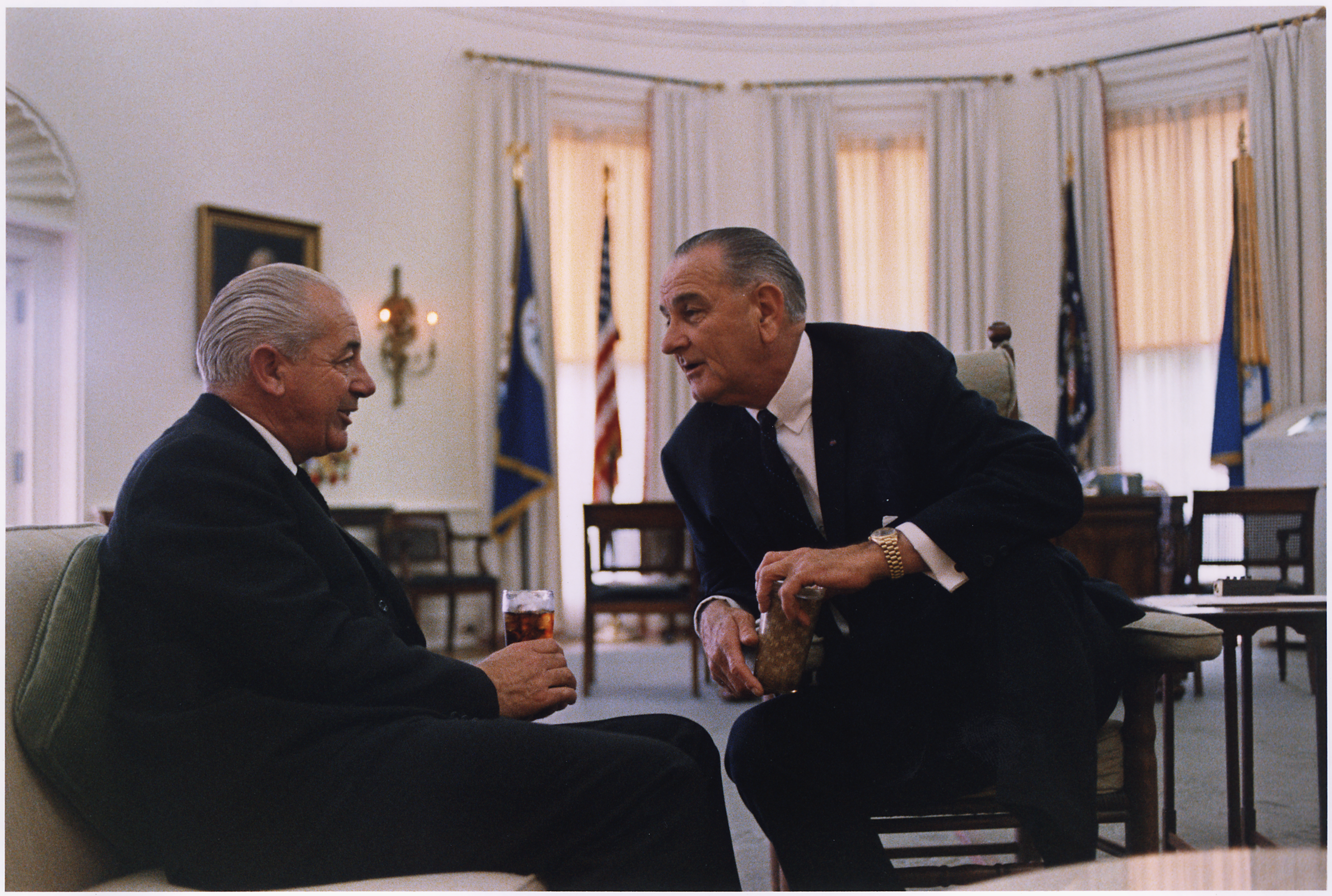
Part 4 looks into the escalation of Australian troops in Vietnam through the negotiations and friendly relations between President LBJ and Prime Minister Harold Holt

Part 4 ‘All the way’ covers Prime Minister Harold Holt's 1966 'all the way with LBJ' committal, the resulting Australian backlash and the decreasing morale amidst Australian troops after the highest losses reported in February 1967. The author writes the main goal of maintaining the red threat diverted to saving South Vietnam by Holt in 1966. He details the Australian soldiers' experience of rest and recuperation and the failure of mine laying in March 1967 that led to numerous accidents and fatalities. He goes on to detail the on-the-job training the soldiers were provided despite a Government June 1967 press release eschewing responsibility. The book looks into the Australian Government's hope for reduced trade tariffs with America in return for the committal of more troops. While the Americans were successful in their objective, no tariffs were reduced. Ham details the further public backlash against the Government's offer to pay individuals who knew of draft dodgers.

=== Part 5 ===
Part 5 ‘The Year of the Monkey’ looks at the effects of the 1969 Tet Offensive in weakening the reputations of Western leaders and Western support for the war. With the replacement of General Westmoreland and the end of LBJ's Presidency there was a renewed confidence among the Viet Cong ranks that was further fuelled by the increasing lack of support from the US and Australian public. Ham covers the change in the media's approach to the war, noting a tendency for exaggerating stories. Ham writes Tet as a turning point in media coverage turning to dramatic headlines and falsified third-party stories of Australian soldiers to react to the "...growing middle class disenchantment with the war". He criticises the nature of these media reports warping interrogation methods into incorrect torture stories He writes that few journalists reported the truth of Tet being a comprehensible Viet Cong defeat and failed to report their atrocities committed in Huế. He notes the impression of abandonment felt among the top and lower military ranks as the Australian government became concerned with the 1969 federal election, their national reputation and maintaining US connections.

=== Part 6 ===
Part 6 ‘WHAM’ covers the changing Australian public attitude of the war despite continued troop involvement in the US 'WHAM’ pacification program. Ham writes that the more prominent opposition to the war came from universities while more peaceful protests were held by the middle-class. He mentions that while opposition to the war became the favourable opinion, the occasional violence in university protests, and donations to the North Vietnamese was considered repugnant by Australian society. The increasing doubt of the war led Australians to question the draft and objective of sending local young men to a violent and distant country. Ham writes that this led to the 1969 'Don't Register' campaign that was supported by a broad alliance of academics and clergymen, that unlike in 1965, praised draft dodgers. The author reflects on the burden of the WHAM program on Australian soldiers who had their own pacification program, the Australian Civil Affair since 1965, which expected them to remain civil and charitable while also continuing to kill the enemy. Ham examines the tactics of the Australian 'acorn operations' which used reports, cross-referenced sources and local intelligence to collect enemy information and compares them to the CIA Phoenix Program.

=== Part 7 ===
Part 7 ‘Homecoming’ looks at the experiences and views of the war from the end of the 1960s to the returning of soldiers in October 1971. Ham writes that Canberra limited the number of casualties to the media to prevent electoral liabilities while simultaneously ordering an escalation of troop aid in South Vietnamese schools and hospitals, despite Australians commanders fearing Viet Congress attacks. Flagging morale led to an increase of offences which the author writes were significantly less compared to the Americans. He disagrees with the media reports at this time denouncing troop behaviour, and suggests that the Australians were unjustly accused of joint responsibility for crimes committed by American soldiers. He goes on to argue against the lack of media coverage of Viet Cong massacres, and reasons that the psychological affects on the Australians were unfairly dismissed. He concludes this section with stories of returning soldiers experiencing negative receptions from the public and within their communities, ranging from relationship breakdowns, public assault to feelings of alienation and ignorance.

=== Part 8 ===
Part 8 ‘Endings’ covers the aftermath of Vietnamization and ongoing effects of the war on former soldiers. Ham writes that after the return of their soldiers, the war faded from the minds of the Western press and public. He looks into the perilous takeover of South Vietnam to Hanoi and the Northern re-education camps as a catalyst for the millions of Vietnamese who fled to Western democracies. Ham includes interviews with Vietnamese Australians and deems that their plight was given little world concern. The Australian Government's 40-year refusal to recognise the link between herbicides and medical conditions is condemned by the author, and criticises their denial of troop exposure to dioxin-containing defoliants. Ham examines the role of Vietnam veterans and psychiatrists in Western health authorities officially recognising PTSD in 1980. Ham notes that soldiers from Vietnam registered "...a higher rate of PTSD than veterans from previous wars..." due to their generational outspokenness, prolonged experience in combat zones, advanced shooting training and fighting a well-disguised enemy. The author acknowledges the October 1987 Welcome Home Parade as a source of reconciliation between the public and veterans as an attempt to improve their image and for the Government to erect the Vietnam War National Monument. Ham notes the continuing argument over Government refusal and recognition of military awards and concludes, "it was, in the end, a politicians' war".

== Critical reception ==
The book has received mostly popular views for its extensive use of sources and detail into the perspective of the war from Australian soldiers. Bill James from the National Observer Book Review paid praise to Ham’s story through debunking generalisations and misconceptions. He concludes that its chronicle of the Australian perspective “…probably as good as we will get" while also positively noting the book's sympathetic tone for Australian soldiers. Similarly, Anne-Maree Whitaker from the Journal of the Royal Australian Historical Society also praises the inclusion of soldier perspectives and the useful inclusion of the Australian honour roll, maps and endnotes. The Australian Review of Public Affairs Journal’s Tony Smith credits Ham’s “…ample attention to the continuing impact of the Vietnam commitment after withdrawal in 1972…”. Monash University's Eras Journal reacted warmly to Ham’s research and attention to the Australian soldiers as impressive, though criticised the argument made against the public’s reception to the soldiers as one that “…leaves the reader feeling as though no amount of reparation will ever be enough to make amends”. The Sydney Morning Herald’s Ross Fitzgerald had a more mixed reception, finding inconsistencies in facts regarding the rates of venereal diseases, and disagreeing to Ham’s accrediting of certain lines from the Communist Manifesto. Fitzgerald does positively receive certain aspects of the book’s sources as “...crucial information about the disturbing behavior of Australian federal politicians and top military commanders in dealing with the war in Vietnam”.

Gerard Henderson's Media Watch Dog from The Sydney Institute had multiple criticisms for the book’s ‘anti-Catholic sectarianism’. He wrote that the influence of Catholic red-scare in politics was exaggerated in Ham’s view of the 1950s Labor Split, and the approval of Diem from prominent Australian Catholics as false according to the timeline. Henderson disagrees to Ham’s statements suggesting a strong anti-Communism among all Catholics.

== Editions ==
- Ham, Paul (2007). Vietnam: The Australian War (1st ed.). HarperCollins
- Ham, Paul (2010). Vietnam: The Australian War (2nd ed). HarperCollins

== Recognition ==
The book has appeared in both NSW and Victorian State School Curriculums for History studies, namely in 2007, and 2016 respectively, as well as the Journal for Australian Studies.

The book has also been quoted by MP Mike Kelly during the 2011 Vietnam Veterans Day, and used in the 2008 40th Anniversary of the Battles of Fire Support Bases Coral and Balmoral by MP Bronwyn Bishop.

== Adaptions ==
The All The Way documentary, based on the book, was released in 2011 as - “a re-examination of a turning point in Australia’s history and national identity. The film addresses both the political and military histories of the war in tandem with each other for the first time. Paul Ham, the author, of the definitive history of the war from the Australian perspective, presents this essay style documentary supported by archival footage, audio, still and interviews with key players”

== See also ==
- Vietnam War
- Military history of Australia during the Vietnam War
- Role of the United States in the Vietnam War
