= David Brooks (author) =

Australian writer (born 1953)

David Gordon Brooks (born 1953) is an Australian poet, novelist, short-fiction writer, and essayist. He is the author of four published novels, four collections of short stories, and five collections of poetry, and his work has won or been shortlisted for major prizes. Brooks is a highly intellectual writer, and his fiction has drawn frequent comparison with the writers Italo Calvino and Jorge Luis Borges.

He studied poetics at the Australian National University (ANU) and in Toronto, Canada, from 1971 to 1986. He has been a hand-press printer of high-quality works, and was an editor of the Australian poetry journals New Poetry, Helix and Southerly. He taught literature at several Australian universities, followed by the creative writing program at Sydney University from 1999 to 2013.

== Early life and education ==
David Gordon Brooks was born in Canberra in 1953. In late 1954 his father, a public servant in the Department of Foreign Affairs, was posted to Athens as an immigration attaché, and Brooks' early childhood was spent in Greece and Yugoslavia, where his father served in 1958.

Upon the family's return to Australia, Brooks attended Turner Infants, Turner Primary, and Canberra High schools. His last year of high school was spent in Cleveland, Ohio, on an American Field Service scholarship. Before leaving, he experienced an illness which kept him bed-bound for two months, a period he spent in intense reading of Sartre, De Beauvoir, Camus, James Joyce, and others.

From 1971 to 1975 Brooks studied poetics at ANU, where his teachers included R.F. Brissenden and A.D. Hope. Hope and Brissenden would subsequently become friends, whose poetry Brooks would later edit. Amongst his fellow students were Alan Gould, Kevin Hart, Philip Mead, and other poets of what is sometimes referred to as "the Canberra school". With Gould, Brooks founded the Open Door Press, the publications of which were all hand-set and printed by hand-press.

Brooks married Alison Summers in 1975 and together they moved to Canada to pursue postgraduate work at the University of Toronto. While in Canada, writing his PhD on the poetics of Pound's early cantos, he served as overseas editor for New Poetry and as a scout for the Literature Board of the Australia Council, helping to arrange Australian residencies for Michael Ondaatje, Galway Kinnell, Mark Strand and others. He was also the hand-press printer and demonstrator for Massey College at the University of Toronto.

== Career ==
=== Academia ===
Back in Australia, Brooks taught initially at Duntroon Military College as a one-year replacement for the critic Dorothy Green, then at the University of Western Australia.

Brooks has taught literature at several Australian universities, including ANU and (from 1991) the University of Sydney. He taught the creative writing program at Sydney University from 1999 to 2013.

He retired in 2013, but was listed on The Conversation website in 2022 as honorary associate professor of literature, University of Sydney.

=== Writing ===
While in Western Australia, Brooks published his first collections of poetry and short fiction. His first collection of poetry, The Cold Front (1983), won the Ann Elder Award and was shortlisted for the NSW Premier's Prize. The Book of Sei in 1985 was his first collection of stories.

After returning to Canberra in 1986 to teach at the ANU, he published the pioneering Poetry and Gender, which he edited with Brenda Walker.

In Sydney, he briefly edited the journal Helix and oversaw its transition to The Phoenix Review. In 1995 he published his first novel, The House of Balthus (based on the paintings of Balthasar Klossowski de Rola), a novel subsequently translated into German and Polish. In 1999 he was asked to succeed Elizabeth Webby as editor of the literary journal Southerly and accepted on the understanding that the editorship be shared (from 2000 until 2007 with Noel Rowe; from 2007 until the present with [Elizabeth McMahon]).

Brooks developed a strong connection with Slovenia, having married Slovenian-born scholar and activist Teya Pribac, translating (among others) Slovenia's premier modern poet Srečko Kosovel with his friend Bert Pribac.

In 2011 he published The Sons of Clovis, a major work of Australian literary history. He resigned his university post early in 2013.

In 2016 he published Derrida's Breakfast, a suite of essays on poetry, philosophy and animals, and early in 2018 he completed the 100 Days Kangaroo Project, one hundred posts in one hundred days, offering a cross-section of the kangaroo in contemporary Australian society.

His fifth novel was provisionally entitled Metamorphosis, and Animal Dreams is a substantial collection of essays on animals, literature, and philosophy.

In 2018 David Brooks retired from the editorship of Southerly. Volume 78 - Number 1 - 2018 "Festschrift" pays tribute to his writing.

== Style ==
In his poetry Brooks was initially significantly influenced by Chinese poets of the Tang dynasty, the 'deep image' poets of the United States (Galway Kinnell, James Wright, Robert Bly), and the Polish poet Czesław Miłosz, whom he met in Toronto in the late 1970s. His early fiction was influenced by the magic realism of Gabriel García Márquez and others, and the speculative fiction of Jorge Luis Borges and Italo Calvino. His fiction has at times been marked by a distinctive mixing of genres both within writing itself and (mixing, for example, fiction and philosophy) within the thought behind it. While generally regarded as a poet of the 'natural' world, he is often seen as a philosophical novelist, concerned in particular with the borders of and between ways of thinking and being.

== Awards ==
=== Personal Award ===
- 2014: Australia Council Fellowship in Fiction
- 2025: Patrick White Award

=== Awards for individual works ===
Poem sequence (1978) Winner — 1978 University of Toronto E.J. Pratt Medal and Prize for Poetry

The Cold Front (1983) Winner — 1983 FAW Anne Elder Poetry Award Shortlisted — 1983 NSW Premier's Prize for poetry

The House of Balthus (1995) Shortlisted — 2010 Australian Book Review Fan Poll Shortlisted — 1995 Aurealis Award for Excellence in Australian Speculative Fiction Shortlisted — 1996 NBC Banjo Award for Fiction

"Back After eight Months Away", poem sequence (1996) Winner — (joint) 1996 Newcastle Poetry Prize

Walking to Point Clear (2005) Shortlisted — 2006 Adelaide Festival John Bray Award for poetry

"The Magician", poem sequence (2006) Shortlisted — The Broadway Poetry Prize

The Fern Tattoo (2007) Shortlisted — 2010 Australian Book Review Fan Poll Shortlisted — 2008 Miles Franklin Award Shortlisted — 2007 Colin Roderick Award for "the best book published in Australia which deals with any aspect of Australian life"

The Balcony (2008) Shortlisted — 2009 NSW Premier's Kenneth Slessor Award for poetry

The Sons of Clovis (2011) Shortlisted — 2011 Colin Roderick Award

The Conversation (2012) Shortlisted — 2012 Western Australian Premier's Award for fiction

Open House (2015) Shortlisted — 2015 Queensland Literary Awards, Judith Wright Calanthe Award for poetry

Derrida’s Breakfast (2016) Runner up — 2016 Mascara Award for Non-fiction

The Other Side of Daylight: New and Selected Poems (2024) Winner — 2025 Prime Minister's Literary Award for poetry

== Personal life ==
Brooks married Alison Summers in 1975, before moving to Canada. They divorced in 1984. Brooks subsequently formed a long relationship with the poet Nicolette Stasko, and they had a child together before separating.

In 2005, Brooks married the Slovenian-born scholar and activist Teya Pribac, whom he had first encountered when visiting Slovenia to launch an anthology of Australian poetry edited by his long-time friend Bert Pribac (no relation to his wife).

In 1978, in Toronto, Brooks experienced a period of paralysis from the waist down, which he believed for many years to have been a manifestation of Guillain–Barré syndrome. In 2010 he was diagnosed with secondary progressive multiple sclerosis.

He is a long-term vegan, and since retiring from his university post, he has devoted his time increasingly to animal advocacy.

== Selected works ==
=== Novels ===
- The House of Balthus. St Leonards, NSW: Allen & Unwin, 1995.
- The Fern Tattoo. St Lucia, QLD: University of Queensland Press, 2007.
- The Umbrella Club. St Lucia: University of Queensland Press, 2009.
- The Conversation. St Lucia: University of Queensland Press, 2012.

=== Poetry ===
- The Cold Front. Sydney: Hale & Iremonger, 1983.
- Walking to Point Clear. Blackheath: Brandl & Schlesinger, 2005.
- Urban Elegies. Sydney: Island Press, 2007.
- The Balcony. St Lucia: University of Queensland Press, 2008.
- Open House. St Lucia: University of Queensland Press, 2015.
- The Other Side of Daylight: New and Selected Poems. St Lucia: University of Queensland Press, 2024

=== Short fiction ===
- The Book of Sei and Other Stories. Sydney: Hale & Iremonger, 1985. The Book of Sei. London: Faber & Faber, 1987.
- Sheep and the Diva. Melbourne: McPhee Gribble, 1990.
- Black Sea. Sydney: Allen & Unwin, 1997.
- Napoleon's Roads. St Lucia: University of Queensland Press, 2016.

=== Non-fiction ===
- The Necessary Jungle: Literature and Excess. Melbourne: McPhee Gribble, 1990.
- De/scription. Sydney: Vagabond Press, 2000.
- The Sons of Clovis: Ern Malley, Adoré Floupette and a Secret History of Australian Poetry, St Lucia: University of Queensland Press, 2011.
- Derrida's Breakfast (four essays). Blackheath: Brandl & Schlesinger, 2016.
- The Grass Library. Blackheath: Brandl & Schlesinger, 2019.

=== Edited ===
- With Brenda Walker Poetry and Gender. St Lucia: University of Queensland Press, 1989.
- A. D. Hope: Selected Poems. Sydney: HarperCollins/Angus & Robertson, 1991.
- Suddenly Evening: Selected Poems of R.F. Brissenden. Melbourne: McPhee Gribble, 1991.
- The Double Looking Glass: New and Classic Essays on the Poetry of A. D. Hope. St Lucia: University of Queensland Press, 2000.
- Selected Poetry and Prose of A. D. Hope. Sydney: Halstead Press, 2000.
