= The Goldfinches of Baghdad =

2006 Australian poetry collection by Robert Adamson

- Author: Robert Adamson
- Language: English
- Genre: Poetry collection
- Publisher: Flood Editions
- Publication date: 2006
- Publication place: USA
- Media type: Print
- Pages: 103 pp.
- Awards: 2007 Grace Leven Prize for Poetry, winner; 2007 The Age Book of the Year Poetry Prize, winner
- ISBN: 0974690287

The Goldfinches of Baghdad is a collection of poems by Australian poet Robert Adamson, published by Flood Editions in USA in 2006.

The collection contains 53 poems from a variety of sources.

== Contents ==
- "A Bend in the Euphrates"
- "A Visitation"
- "The Greenshank"
- "Whitling Kites"
- "Easter Fish"
- "The Voyage"
- "Walking by the River"
- "Eurydice and the Mudlark"
- "The Floating Head"
- "Eurydice Agape"
- "The Serpent"
- "Eurydice and the Tawny Frogmouth"
- "Singing His Head Off"
- "Eurydice after a Midnight Storm"
- "Letter to Eurydice"
- "Eurydice Combs Her Hair"
- "Eurydice on Fire"
- "Eurydice Reads 'Roots and Branches'"
- "Eurydice in Sydney"
- "Thinking of Eurydice at Midnight"
- "Symbolism"
- "Gang Gang Cockatoos"
- "Eclectus Parrot"
- "Major Mitchell's Pink Cockatoo"
- "Red Necked Avocet"
- "The Ruff"
- "Rainbow Bee-Eaters"
- "The Ravens : After Trakl"
- "The Peach-Faced Finches of Madagascar"
- "The Dollarbird"
- "The Cow Bird"
- "The Grey Whistler"
- "The Flag-Tailed Bird of Paradise"
- "The Goldfinches of Baghdad"
- "Fishing in a Landscape for Love"
- "Brahminy Kite"
- "The First Chance Was the Last Chance"
- "Powder Hulk Bay"
- "Winter Night"
- "Elegy from Balmoral Beach"
- "Memory Walks"
- "On Not Seeing Paul Cezanne"
- "Eventail : For Mery in Paris"
- "Elizabeth Bishop in Tasmania"
- "Letter to Robert Creeley"
- "Letter to Tom Raworth"
- "The Flow Through"
- "Not a Penny Sonnets"
- "The Apostlebird"
- "David Aspden's Red Theme"
- "David Aspden's Yellow Tree"
- "Flannel Flowers for Juno"
- "Reaching Light"
- "Brahminy Kite"
- "Gang Gang Cockatoos"

== Critical reception ==
Writing in Australian Book Review Jaya Savige was impressed with the "shape" of this collection, noting: "As the culmination of forty years' experience, it is nothing short of a masterpiece." He continued: "As a collection, it is sublimely cohesive: from first to last, the correspondences between poems are considerably fecund. Less a series of songs than an organically realised symphony, the volume is replete with a masterful lyricism and a comprehensive, mythopoeic grandeur verging on an indigenous 'dreaming'."

In The Weekend Australian reviewer Barry Hill called the collection "a marvel in several ways." He went on: "Some poems gesture, nostalgically, towards mortality, as well as ambivalently towards an earlier bohemian life; others allude to dislocations and possible reconciliations in matters of love; there is, too, a set of conceits about failures of utterance, a feeling belied by the poems themselves. But all of this is done with a deftness that avoids the reductive tedium of the merely biographical."

== Awards ==
- 2007 Grace Leven Prize for Poetry, winner
- 2007 The Age Book of the Year Poetry Prize, winner
- 2007 New South Wales Premier's Literary Awards – Kenneth Slessor Prize for Poetry, shortlisted

== See also ==
- 2006 in Australian literature
