= The Patron Saint of Eels =

Book by Gregory Day

- Author: Gregory Day
- Language: English
- Genre: novel
- Publisher: Picador, Australia
- Publication date: 2005
- Publication place: Australia
- Media type: Print (Paperback)
- Pages: 181
- ISBN: 0330421581

The Patron Saint of Eels (2005) is a novel by Australian author Gregory Day. It won the 2006 ALS Gold Medal.

== Plot summary ==
A moral tale, the novel tells the story of an Italian saint, Fra Ionio, who comes down from heaven to the small Australian town of Mangowak, to save some eels trapped in a ditch and to teach life lessons to some locals.

== Reviews ==
Lisa Gorton in The Age noted that the novel "is gentle in spirit, reverent and celebratory", and "is as much a tribute to the life of a small town as it is the hagiography of a saint."

== Awards and nominations ==
- 2006 shortlisted Commonwealth Writers Prize South East Asia and South Pacific Region — Best First Book
- 2006 winner ALS Gold Medal
