= Dogfall =

Play written by Caleb Lewis

Dogfall is an Australian play written by South Australian playwright Caleb Lewis, first produced in November 2007. Set in World War I, this absurdist play has an anti-war theme.

== Plot and themes ==
The play travels through time with the central characters of Will, a soldier, and Jack, a medic, appearing in bunker and trench warfare in multiple historical wars; with the play linking the events as one long drawn out war. The play begins in 1916, during the Somme. The battle shifts continuously, and the sky continues to fall... Dogfall depicts the absurdity of war; outside it is literally raining cats dogs, and other animals.

The two men are joined by "semi-pacifist" Alousha, and scenes from other theatres of war, notably the Vietnam War, Nanking, London, Guernica, Northern Ireland, Rwanda, and Guantanamo Bay detention camp are portrayed. The plot is absurd but the themes complex and multi-layered.

== Original production ==
The first production of this anti-war play was launched at the Bakehouse Theatre in Adelaide, South Australia from 2 to 17 November 2007. Critic Stephen Davenport described it as a "brilliant play" that was "disturbing and morbidly funny" and "superbly written by Caleb Lewis". US playwright Edward Albee, with whom Lewis had undertaken a two-week workshop, called the play "wonderful".

=== Cast ===
The cast comprised:

- Brendan Rock
- Martin Hissey
- Joseph Del Re

=== Crew ===
- Director: Justin McGuinness
- Composer: Peter Nielsen
- Lighting: Nic Mollison
- Costume & Props: Tsubi Du
- Publicity: Antje Guenther
- Produced by: TheimaGen

== 2016 U.S. production ==
Dogfall was staged by Iron Age Theatre in Philadelphia, in the United States, in February 2016, directed by John Doyle.

== 2025 Canberra production ==
Dogfall was brought back to Australia by the National University Theatre Society at Kambri Theatre in May of 2025, directed by Isaiah Prichard and Jessi Gooding. The cast included Natasha Lyall, Sam Odgers and Belinda Lawrence, and received a positive reception from audiences.
