= Tamara McKinley =

Australian author

- Born: 1948 (age 77–78)
- Citizenship: British-Australian
- Writing career
- Pen name: Ellie Dean (Cliffehaven series)
- Language: English
- Website: www.tamaramckinley.co.uk

Tamara McKinley (born 1948) is a British-based Australian author, living in the south of England. She also wrote as Ellie Dean.

She was born in Launceston, Tasmania in 1948, but was raised in Devonport until the age of ten, when she accompanied her English grandmother (who had adopted her at age six) to the United Kingdom where she has been based ever since. Although based in Britain, she visits Australia every year to research her novels which are all set there.

Her novels to date are published in at least 15 different languages.

As Ellie Dean, she has also written the Cliffehaven series which has sold more than a million copies.

Her home is in Jevington, East Sussex where she lived with her husband, Geoffrey Oliver "Ollie" Carter until his death in December 2020.

In March 2021 she announced her retirement from writing.

== Bibliography ==
- Matilda's Last Waltz (2000, Piatkus Books)
- Jacaranda Vines (2001, Piatkus Books)
- Windflowers (2002, Piatkus Books)
- Summer Lightning (2003, Piatkus Books)
- Undercurrents (2004, Piatkus Books)
- Dreamscapes (2005, Piatkus Books)
- Lands Beyond the Sea (2007, Hodder & Stoughton)
- A Kingdom for the Brave (2008, Hodder & Stoughton)
- Legacy (2009, Hodder & Stoughton)
- Ocean Child (2010, Quercus)
- Savannah Winds (2014, Quercus)
- Firestorm (2014, Quercus)
- Echoes from Afar (2015, Quercus)
- Spindrift (2017, Quercus)
