= Paul Ham =

Australian author (born 1960)

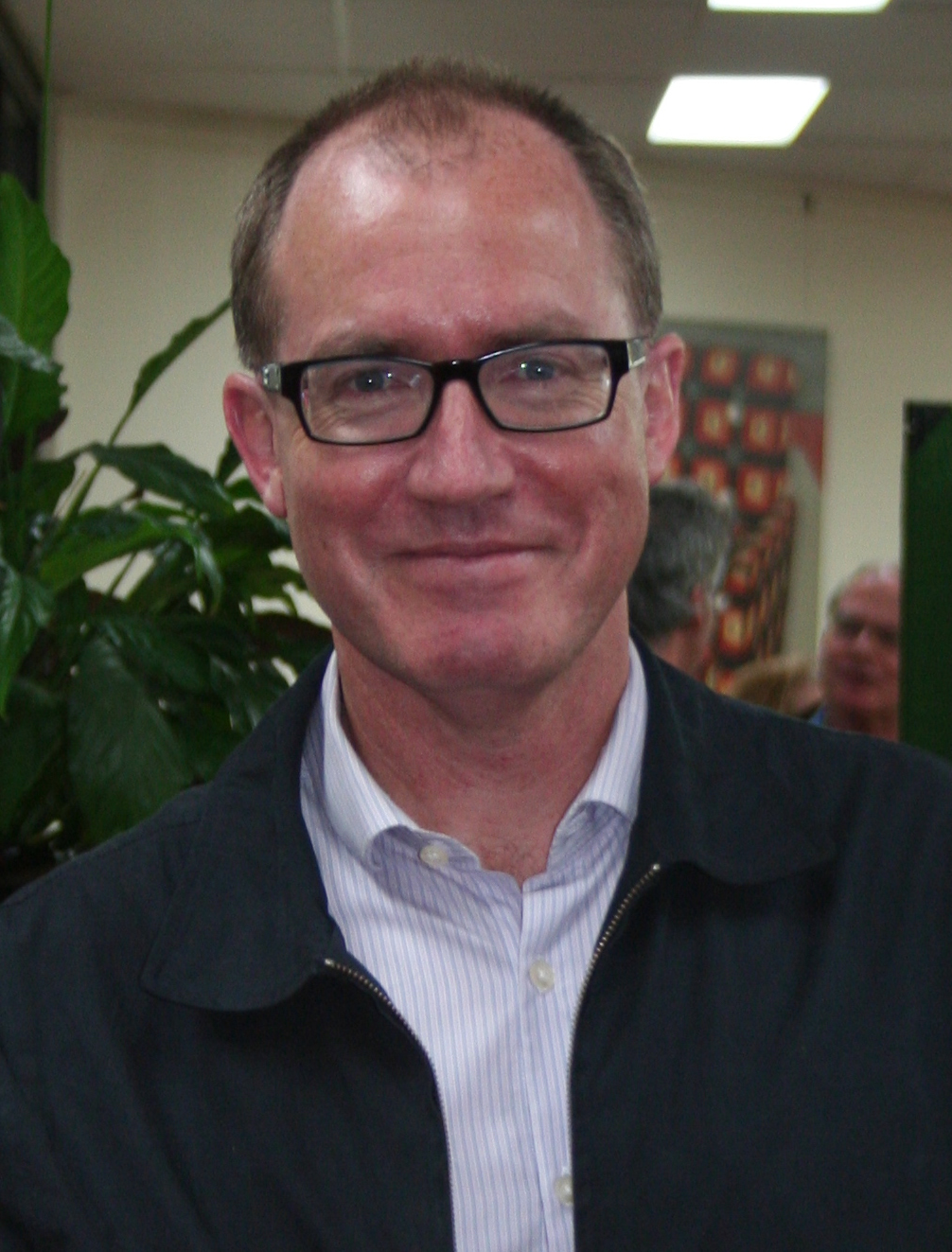
Ham in 2011

Paul Ham (born 1960) is an Australian author and historian who writes about conflict, religion and the history of ideas. He has published 14 books, mostly with Penguin Random House. His latest is The Soul: A History of the Human Mind. He lives in Sydney and Paris.

== Life and career ==
Ham was born in Sydney. From 1984 to 1998 he worked in London as a business and investment journalist for the Financial Times Group and The Sunday Times (as its investment editor, 1994–1998). In 1992 he co-founded a financial newsletter publishing company, whose titles included Governance and The Money Laundering Bulletin, which he sold in 1997. For part of that period Ham also worked part-time as the editor of Amnesty, the magazine of the British headquarters of Amnesty International. On his return to Australia in 1998, Ham was appointed the Australia correspondent for the London Sunday Times, a post he held for the next 15 years.

From 2000 to 2003 he wrote his first history, Kokoda – the story of the Kokoda Track campaign, the first land defeat of the Japanese in the Second World War; followed by Vietnam: The Australian War – a history of Australia's 15-year military involvement in Vietnam. Vietnam won the 2008 New South Wales Premier's History Award and was shortlisted for the Prime Minister's Literary Awards for non-fiction; both Vietnam and Kokoda were shortlisted for the Walkley Award for Non-Fiction. His next book, Hiroshima Nagasaki, a controversial history of the atomic bomb, was shortlisted for the New South Wales Premier's History Awards, received an honorable mention in the Australian Prime Minister's Prize for History and was published to critical acclaim in the United States, Britain and Australia.

In 2010, Ham co-wrote and presented the documentary All the Way, produced by November Films in conjunction with the Australian Broadcasting Corporation (ABC), based on his history of the Vietnam War, which won the UN Media Peace Award. In 2008 he was involved in the production of a documentary based on Kokoda, produced by Pericles Films, the ABC and Screen Australia. In 2012, Ham set up an electronic publishing business called Hampress, which published short ebooks and classic audiobooks.

In 2013, Ham published 1914: The Year the World Ended in Britain and Australia, which won the Queensland Literary Award for non-fiction in 2014. His next book Sandakan: The Untold Story of the Sandakan Death Marches, was shortlisted for the Prime Minister's Literary Awards. In 2016–17, Penguin Random House published his books Passchendaele: Requiem for Doomed Youth and Young Hitler: The Making of the Führer in Australia and Britain. In 2017, Passchendaele won the NSW Premier's Prize for Non-Fiction.

Ham is the author of the weekly substack, On Earth As It Is, inspired by his book, The Soul and others. He was a regular contributor to Amazon's Kindle single platform, having published 1913, The Target Committee and, with the psychotherapist Bernie Brown, Honey, We Forgot the Kids, an examination of the state of families and childcare in the West.

Ham teaches narrative history at Sciences Po in France and has a master's degree in economic history from the London School of Economics and Political Science, a Bachelor of Arts (Communications) degree from Charles Sturt University and attended Scots College, Sydney. If he has time, Ham organises an annual poetry recital, The Big Fat Poetry Pig-Out, the proceeds of which go to selected charities.

== Books ==
- Kokoda, HarperCollins, 2004
- Vietnam: The Australian War, HarperCollins Australia, 2007
- Sandakan, Heinemann, 2012
- 1914: The Year the World Ended, Random House Australia, 2013
- Yoko's Diary: The life of a young girl in Hiroshima during WWII, ABC Books, 2013 (translated by Debbie Edwards; edited by Paul Ham)
- 1913: The Eve of War (Endeavour Press 2013, Kindle single)
- Passchendaele: Requiem for Doomed Youth (Penguin Random House 2016–17)
- Young Hitler: The Making of the Führer (Penguin Random House 2017)
- The Target Committee (Endeavour Press 2018, Kindle single)
- Honey, We Forgot the Kids, with Bernie Brown (Hampress 2018, Kindle single)
- Godless (Random House Australia 2018) ISBN 9780143781332
- The Soul – A History of the Human Mind, Penguin Random House, 2024
