= Adrian Hyland =

Australian writer

- Born: Adrian Hyland; Melbourne, Victoria, Australia
- Writing career
- Language: English
- Genre: crime fiction
- Notable work: Diamond Dove
- Notable awards: Ned Kelly Award for Best First Novel

Adrian Hyland is an Australian writer of non-fiction and crime fiction.

== Life ==
Hyland attended the University of Melbourne, where he studied literature, classics, and Chinese language. After graduating from university, he lived for many years in outback communities of Australia. Family circumstances brought him and his wife back to Victoria, where he now lives.

== Writing career ==
Hyland's two crime novels feature young indigenous woman Emily Tempest, the daughter of an Aboriginal mother and white father and a graduate of the University of Melbourne. In the first novel, Diamond Dove, she is an amateur detective; by the second, Gunshot Road, she is employed as an Aboriginal community police officer.

Hyland was living at St Andrews, Victoria when the Black Saturday bushfires of 2009 swept through the area. His 2011 non-fiction book Kinglake 350 is an account of the experiences of local police officer A/Sergeant Roger Wood, who was in charge at Kinglake during the fires.

His books have been published internationally, including in Britain and the US, and translated into a variety of languages, including German, French, Swedish and Czech.

== Bibliography ==
=== Novels ===
Emily Tempest series

- Diamond Dove (2006)
- Gunshot Road (2010)

Other novels

- Canticle Creek (2021)

=== Non-fiction ===
- Kinglake 350 (2011)

== Awards ==
- 2007 winner Ned Kelly Awards for Crime Writing—Best First Novel for Diamond Dove
- 2010 shortlisted Colin Roderick Award for Gunshot Road
- 2011 highly commended Western Australian Premier's Book Awards—Non-Fiction for Kinglake 350
- 2012 shortlisted Prime Minister's Literary Awards—Non-Fiction for Kinglake 350
- 2012 shortlisted The Age Book of the Year Awards—Non-Fiction Prize for Kinglake 350
