= Deborah Robertson =

Australian writer (born 1959)

- Born: 1959 (age 66–67); Bridgetown, Western Australia
- Writing career
- Language: English
- Years active: 1990-
- Notable work: Careless
- Notable awards: Nita Kibble Literary Award, 2007

Deborah Robertson (1959) is an Australian writer. She was born in Bridgetown, Western Australia, and lives in Melbourne.

== Awards ==
- International Dublin Literary Award, 2008: longlisted for Careless
- Nita Kibble Literary Award, 2007: winner for Careless
- The Age Book of the Year Award, Fiction Prize, 2007: shortlisted for Careless
- Orange Prize for Fiction (UK), 2007: longlisted for Careless
- New South Wales Premier's Literary Awards, Christina Stead Prize for Fiction, 2007: shortlisted for Careless
- Commonwealth Writers Prize, South East Asia and South Pacific Region, Best Book, 2007: shortlisted for Careless
- Miles Franklin Literary Award, 2007: shortlisted for Careless
- Australian Book Industry Awards (ABIA), Australian Literary Fiction Book of the Year, 2007: shortlisted for Careless
- Colin Roderick Award, 2006: winner for Careless
- Western Australian Premier's Book Awards, Fiction, 2006: shortlisted for Careless
- Arts Queensland Steele Rudd Australian Short Story Award, 1998: winner for Proudflesh
- Katharine Susannah Prichard Award, 1991: winner for 'Babyhead'

== Bibliography ==
=== Novels ===
- Careless (2006, Picador)
- Sweet Old World (2012, Vintage)

=== Short stories ===
- Proudflesh (1997, Fremantle Arts Centre Press)
