= Careless (novel) =

2006 novel by Deborah Robertson

- Author: Deborah Robertson
- Language: English
- Genre: Novel
- Publisher: Vintage Books, Australia
- Publication date: 2006
- Publication place: Australia
- Media type: Print (Paperback)
- Pages: 293 pp
- ISBN: 978-0-330-42235-2
- OCLC: 224695918

Careless is a 2006 novel by Australian author Deborah Robertson.

== Dedication ==
"For my brothers, Scott and Tony."

== Plot summary ==
The novel follows the lives of four protagonists - Pearl, Anna, Sonia and Adam - who have all been touched by grief and despair. Suffering alone they are all drawn together by a tragic event.

== Awards ==
- International Dublin Literary Award, 2008: longlisted
- Commonwealth Writers Prize, South East Asia and South Pacific Region, Best Book, 2007: shortlisted
- Miles Franklin Literary Award, 2007: shortlisted
- Orange Prize for Fiction (UK), 2007: longlisted
- New South Wales Premier's Literary Awards, Christina Stead Prize for Fiction, 2007: shortlisted
- Nita Kibble Literary Award, 2007: winner
- Australian Book Industry Awards (ABIA), Australian Literary Fiction Book of the Year, 2007: shortlisted
- The Age Book of the Year Award, Fiction Prize, 2007: shortlisted
- Western Australian Premier's Book Awards, Fiction, 2006: shortlisted
- Colin Roderick Award, 2006: winner

References may be found on the individual award pages.

== Reviews ==
Rachel Slater in Australian Women's Book Review noted: "Death and grief are central to this novel, and in particular the concept of public versus private grief and the questions around how art can deal with a subject of such magnitude...Careless offers an intimate yet shared portrayal of grief in all its complexities and reminds us that our promises of care can never really be kept."
