= Gregory Day =

Australian novelist, poet and musician

- Born: Kew, Melbourne, Victoria, Australia
- Occupation: writer
- Writing career
- Years active: 1990 —
- Notable works: The Patron Saint of Eels, The Flash Road: Scenes From The Building Of The Great Ocean Road, Archipelago Of Souls, A Sand Archive, The Bell Of The World
- Notable awards: Patrick White Award, ALS Gold Medal, Nature Conservancy Nature Writing Prize, Elizabeth Jolley Short Story Prize

Gregory Day is an Australian novelist, poet, and musician.

== Life ==
Gregory Day is a novelist, poet, essayist and musician based in Victoria, Australia. He is well known for novels which document generational, demographic, and environmental change on the 21st-century coast of Victoria, Australia. He has been much acclaimed for his musical compositions and field recordings, notably his settings and singing of the poetry of William Butler Yeats on the album The Black Tower, and his project The Flash Road, which narrates in song the building of the Great Ocean Road in southwest Victoria in the years following The Great War. Day is also the co-founder with artist and book designer, Sian Marlow, of the fine press limited edition literature and music publisher, Merrijig Word & Sound Co.

== Awards and nominations ==
- Commonwealth Writers' Prize, South East Asia and South Pacific Region, Best First Book, 2006: The Patron Saint of Eels — shortlisted
- ALS Gold Medal, 2006: The Patron Saint of Eels — winner
- New South Wales Premier's Literary Awards, Christina Stead Prize for Fiction, 2008: Ron McCoy's Sea of Diamonds: A Novel — shortlisted
- Elizabeth Jolley Short Story Prize, 2011: The Neighbour's Beans — winner
- Manly Artist Book Award, 2017: A Smile at Arm's Length — winner
- Tasmanian Literary Award, Tasmania Book Prize, 2017: Archipelago of Souls — shortlisted
- Nature Conservancy, Australia Nature Writing Prize, 2019: Summer On The Painkalac — shortlisted
- Miles Franklin Award, 2019: A Sand Archive — shortlisted
- Patrick White Award, 2020 — winner
- Nature Conservancy Australia Nature Writing Prize, 2021 – winner
- Miles Franklin Award, 2024: The Bell of the World – shortlisted
- Blake Poetry Prize, 2026: The Church Was Strangely Empty But The Day Outside Was Full — longlisted

== Bibliography ==
=== Novels ===
- The Patron Saint of Eels (2005)
- Ron McCoy's Sea of Diamonds (2007)
- The Grand Hotel (2010)
- Archipelago of Souls (2015)
- A Sand Archive (2018)
- The Bell of the World (2023)

=== Essays ===
- Words Are Eagles: Selected Writings on the Nature and Language of Place (2022)

=== Artist Books ===
- visitors - with Jiri Tibor Novak (2012)
- A Smile At Arm's Length — with Jiri Tibor Novak (2016)

=== Poetry ===
- Six Different Ways (1999) — with Kieran Carroll and Michael Farrell etc.
- Trace (in collaboration with photographer Robert Ashton) (2003)
- A Smile At Arm's Length (2016)
- Southsightedness (2025)

=== Music ===
- Untitled Red: No Evangelism (1992)
- Barroworn: Mangowak Days (1995)
- The Black Tower: Songs From The Poetry of W. B. Yeats (1998)
- Trace soundtrack with Silver Ray (2003)
- The Flash Road: Scenes From The Building Of The Great Ocean Road (2005)
- The Ampliphones: Emotional Patterns of a New Climate (2015)
- ‘’O’ To The Bough Of The Blackwood Tree: Retrospective album’’ (2026)

== Interviews & Presentations ==
- "ABC Radio National Books and Arts" July 2015
- "ABC Radio National Book Show" - 21 May 2008
- "Paperbark Words on The Bell Of The World" July 2024
- "Towards An Ethics Of Receptivity: Reading Gregory Day's The Bell Of The World - Séminaire n°1 - Université Grenoble Alpes - Peter Mathews (University of Macau) 15/10/2024"
- "The Leaf Bookshop Interview with Gregory Day on Southsightedness - 30 Authors in 30 Days March 2025"
- "ABC Radio National - The Music Show's Andrew Ford interviews Gregory Day about Southsightedness"
