= Diamond Dove (novel) =

Book by Adrian Hyland

- First edition
- Author: Adrian Hyland
- Language: English
- Series: Emily Tempest
- Genre: novel
- Publisher: Text Publishing, Australia
- Publication date: 2006
- Publication place: Australia
- Media type: Print (Paperback)
- Pages: 322
- ISBN: 1921145307
- Followed by: Gunshot Road

Diamond Dove (2006) is a crime novel by Australian author Adrian Hyland. It is the first in the author's series of novels featuring the recurring character Emily Tempest. It won the Best First Novel category of the 2007 Ned Kelly Awards.

== Plot summary ==
Emily Tempest, the daughter of a white miner and his black wife, returns to her childhood home, Moonlight Downs in the Northern Territory, after completing her schooling at an Adelaide boarding school. Her homecoming is impacted by the murder of Lincoln, the local elder. The police are baffled but Tempest makes use of her unique background to track down the killer.

== Notes ==
- Dedication: For Kristin

== Reviews ==
Mindy Laube in the Sydney Morning Herald noted that the novel is "popular literature of the stylish and substantial variety".

== Awards and nominations ==
- 2006: commended, The Fellowship of Australian Writers Victoria Inc. National Literary Awards — FAW Christina Stead Award
- 2007: winner, Ned Kelly Awards for Crime Writing — Best First Novel
