= Our Little Secret (novel) =

2007 novel by Allayne Webster

- Author: Allayne Webster
- Language: English
- Genre: Fiction
- Publisher: Omnibus Books
- Publication date: 2007
- Publication place: Australia
- Media type: Print
- Pages: 217
- ISBN: 9781862917231
- OCLC: 174100020
- Dewey Decimal: A823.4

Our Little Secret (ISBN 9781862917231) is a 2007 novel written by South Australian author Allayne Webster. The book focuses on a 14-year-old girl, who is seduced and then sexually abused by a man.

The book has gained considerable controversy recently in local politics. Webster says the book should be read by girls 14 and over to understand how sexual predators operate. Nick Xenophon agreed, saying he wants schools to add the book to their curriculum.
