= Will Elliott =

Australian horror writer

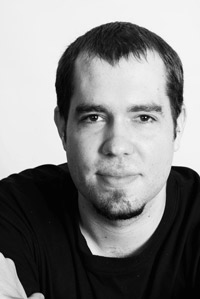
- Born: 1979 (age 46–47); Australia
- Occupation: Writer
- Writing career
- Period: 2002 to present
- Genres: Horror fiction Literary fiction
- Website: will-elliott.org

Will Elliott (born 1979) is an Australian horror and fantasy writer living in Brisbane, Queensland. He currently tutors at the University of the Sunshine Coast.

== Profile ==
Elliott dropped out of a law degree at the age of 20 when he developed schizophrenia. His first novel, The Pilo Family Circus, concerns a young man who struggles with an alter ego who appears when he dons clown face paint; Elliott has said the novel is not autobiographical. The Pilo Family Circus was published in Australia in 2006 after winning the inaugural ABC Fiction Award (sponsored by ABC Books). The novel went on to win the Aurealis Award (co-winner: Best Horror novel, plus the Golden Aurealis Award), the Australian Shadows Award, the Ditmar Award (Best Novel), The Sydney Morning Herald's "Best Young Novelist Award" for 2007 and the 'Premios Nocte' Best Foreign Book Award 2011. The Pilo Family Circus was also short-listed for the 2007 International Horror Guild Award for Best Novel. The Pilo Family Circus was picked North American distribution by Victoria Blake's new publishing company, Underland Press and debuted there in 2009. A sequel, entitled "The Pilo Traveling Circus", has appeared.

The Pendulum Trilogy, a fantasy trilogy made up of Pilgrim, Shadow and World's End was published between 2010 and 2011 (on two separate dates) by HarperCollins Publishers Australia. Elliott has expressed disappointment with this series. He said that it was written in difficult personal circumstances, and that it is "not the kind of fiction he should be writing". The trilogy still received a positive critical response from reviewers.

Elliott's dark humor fantasy Nightfall was published in Australia in 2012. A standalone comic fantasy, "Inside Out" was published in October, 2013.

Elliott's short stories include his first published short fiction, "Ain't no ordinary ham", published in the September 2006 issue of Griffith Review. It was reprinted in Best Australian Stories 2006, ed. Robert Drewe (Black Ink, 2006). "Pre-emptive Strike" was published in the 2007 volume. Happy Endings, a short story collection, was published in May 2013 as an E-book.

A memoir, "Strange Places" was released in Australia in 2009. It detailed Elliott's experiences with schizophrenia and the development of his writing career. It was short-listed for the Prime Minister's Literary Awards for nonfiction in 2010.

His writing influences include Clive Barker, Tristan Egolf, Jasper Fforde, Stephen King, H.P. Lovecraft, Mervyn Peake, and George Saunders.

== Selected bibliography ==
=== Fiction ===
==== Novels ====
===== Pilo Family Circus =====
- The Pilo Family Circus (ABC Books)
- The Pilo Traveling Show (Underland Press)

===== Pendulum trilogy =====
- The Pilgrims (HarperCollins Publishers Australia)
- Shadow (HarperCollins Publishers Australia)
- World's End (HarperCollins Publishers Australia)

==== Stand-alone novels ====
- Nightfall (HarperCollins Publishers Australia.)
- Inside Out (HarperCollins Publishers Australia)

=== Short fiction ===
- Happy Endings (2013) (collection)

=== Nonfiction ===
- Strange Places (ABC Books)

== Awards ==
=== Wins ===
- Ditmar Award, Best Novel (2007)
- Australian Shadows Award (2007)
- Golden Aurealis Award, Best Novel (2007)
- Aurealis Award, Horror novel, co-winner with Edwina Grey's Prismatic (2007)
- "Best Young Novelist Award", The Sydney Morning Herald (2007)
- ABC Fiction Award (2006)
- Nocte Award Best Foreign Book Award (2011).

=== Nominations ===
- International Horror Guild Award, Novel (2007)
- Prime Minister's Literary Awards for Nonfiction(2010)
