= List of Australian films of 2007 =

| Title | Director | Cast | Genre | Notes |
|---|---|---|---|---|
| 4 | Tim Slade | Sayaka Shoji, Niki Vasilakis | Documentary | |
| All My Friends Are Leaving Brisbane | Louise Alston | Charlotte Gregg, Matt Zeremes | Romantic Comedy | |
| Angela's Decision | Mat King | Rhiannon Owen, Xavier Samuel | Drama | |
| The Bet | Mark Lee | Matthew Newton, Aden Young | Drama | |
| Black Water | David Nerlich, Andrew Traucki | Diana Glenn, Maeve Dermody | Horror | |
| Boxing Day | Kriv Stenders | Richard Green, Tammy Anderson | Drama | |
| Bra Boys | Mat King | Russell Crowe | Documentary | |
| Burke and Wills | Oliver Torr and Matthew Zeremes | Oliver Torr and Matthew Zeremes | Drama | |
| Clubland | Cherie Nowlan | Khan Chittenden, Emma Booth | Drama | |
| Corroboree | Ben Hackworth | Conor O'Hanlon, Rebecca Frith | Mystery | |
| Crocodile Dreaming | Darlene Johnson | David Gulpilil, Jamie Gulpilil, Tom E. Lewis | Short drama | |
| Chak De! India | Shimit Amin | Shah Rukh Khan | Sports film | |
| Curtin | Jessica Hobbs | William McInnes, Noni Hazlehurst | Drama | |
| December Boys | Rod Hardy | Daniel Radcliffe, Teresa Palmer | Drama | |
| Dr. Plonk | Rolf de Heer | Nigel Lunghi, Magda Szubanski | Comedy | |
| The Final Winter | Brian Andrews | Matt Nable, Matthew Johns | Drama | |
| Forbidden Lie$ | Anna Broinowski | Norma Khouri | Documentary | |
| Gabriel | Shane Abbess | Andy Whitfield, Dwaine Stevenson | Supernatural action | |
| Gone | Ringan Ledwidge | Shaun Evans, Scott Mechlowicz | Thriller | |
| Hammer Bay | Ben Briand | Guy Edmonds, Jacki Weaver | Drama | |
| The Home Song Stories | Tony Ayres | Joan Chen, Joel Lok, Qi Yuwu | Drama | |
| The Independent | John Studley and Andrew O'Keefe | Lee Mason, Tony Nikolakopoulos | Mockumentary | |
| The Jammed | Dee McLachlan | Emma Lung, Saskia Burmeister | Thriller | |
| The King | Matthew Saville | Stephen Curry, Stephen Hall | Drama | Television film |
| Lucky Miles | Michael James Rowland | Kenneth Moraleda, Srisacd Sacdpraseuth | Comedy, drama | |
| Mere Oblivion | Burleigh Smith | Burleigh Smith, Elizabeth Caiacob | Comedy, drama | |
| Modern Love | Alex Frayne | Mark Constable, Victoria Hill | Horror | |
| Moonlight & Magic | Timothy Spanos | Tim Burns, Maxine Klibingaitis | Comedy, drama | |
| Naked on the Inside | Kim Farrant | Kim Farrant, Carré Otis | Documentary | |
| Night | Lawrence Johnston | Al Clark | Documentary | |
| Noise | Matthew Saville | Brendan Cowell, Maia Thomas | Crime drama | |
| Policing the Pacific | Alan D'Arcy Erson, Andrew Merrifield | David Wenham | Documentary | |
| Razzle Dazzle: A Journey into Dance | Darren Ashton | Kerry Armstrong, Ben Miller | Comedy | |
| Rogue | Greg McLean | Radha Mitchell, Michael Vartan | Horror | |
| Romulus, My Father | Richard Roxburgh | Eric Bana, Kodi Smit-McPhee | Drama | AACTA Award for Best Film |
| September | Peter Carstairs | Clarence John Ryan, Xavier Samuel, | Drama | |
| Son of a Lion | Benjamin Gilmour | Sher Alam Miskeen Ustad, Niaz Khan Shinwari, Baktiyar Ahmed Afridi | Drama | |
| Storm Warning | Jamie Blanks | Nadia Farès, John Brumpton | Horror | |
| Twin Rivers | Darren Holmes | Darren Holmes, Matthew Holmes, Joshua Jaeger | Drama | |
| West | Daniel Krige | Nathan Phillips, Khan Chittenden | Drama, romance | |

== See also ==
- 2007 in Australia
- 2007 in Australian television
- List of 2007 box office number-one films in Australia
