= Caroline Overington =

Australian journalist and author (born 1970)

- Born: 1970 (age 55–56); Melbourne
- Occupations: Journalist, author
- Website: carolineoverington.com

Caroline Overington (born 1970) is an Australian journalist and author. Overington has written 13 books. She has twice won the Walkley Award for investigative journalism, as well as winning the Sir Keith Murdoch prize for journalism (2007), the Blake Dawson Waldron Prize (2008) and the Davitt Award for Crime Writing (2015).

== Life and career ==
Overington was born in Melbourne, Victoria in 1970.

She began her journalism cadetship with The Melton Mail Express, and other titles in The Age Suburban Newspaper Group, covering courts, local council, and school fetes. Melbourne businessman and editor, Alan Kohler, recruited Overington to write for The Age in 1993, where she became a sports writer. Several of her pieces were selected for the Best Australian Sports Writing and Photography anthologies, published by Random House in the 1990s. She was awarded the Annita Keating Trophy for Female Journalism in Sport.

In 2002, Overington assumed a position as foreign correspondent in New York for The Sydney Morning Herald and The Age. Her first book, Only in New York, published by Allen & Unwin in 2006, is a comedy based on her family's experiences with young twins in the United States. While based in the US, Overington's work included an investigation into an Australian literary scandal involving Norma Khouri's book Forbidden Love. Together with Malcolm Knox, Overington won a Walkley Award for investigative journalism in 2004 for her research into the mysterious life of Jordanian-American-Australian author Norma Khouri. Both Overington and Knox appeared in Forbidden Lie$, a documentary on the scandal by Anna Broinowski that won a Walkley Award and two Australian Film Institute (AFI) Awards.

Following her return to Australia in 2006, Overington gained a position as senior journalist with the News Limited newspaper The Australian. She covered the AWB scandal, in which AWB Limited (formerly the Australian Wheat Board), owned by the Australian Government, paid $290 million in kickbacks to the regime of Saddam Hussein, in contravention of the United Nations Oil-for-Food Humanitarian Program. Overington's book Kickback: Inside the Australian Wheat Board Scandal, released by Allen & Unwin in 2007, provided an account of the scandal.

During the 2007 federal election campaign, Overington made headlines for her conduct in the Wentworth electorate although no adverse findings against Overington were made. Overington was said to have been involved in an altercation with the Labor candidate George Newhouse, who claimed Overington had "whacked" him, while Overington said she had pushed him away with an open hand. The Australian published an apology to Newhouse from Overington over what as described as "an encounter" in December 2007.

Overington's first novel, Ghost Child was released in 2009 to both literary and popular acclaim. The book was short-listed for the Davitt Prize for Best Adult Crime Novel. Her second novel, I Came To Say Goodbye, was short-listed for Book of the Year and Fiction Book of the Year at the Australian Book Industry Awards in 2010. The novel Matilda is Missing, released in 2011, told the tale of a divorce custody case, through the eyes of a court-appointed psychologist.

In 2014, Overington's book Last Woman Hanged was released, documenting the results of her five-year investigation into the conviction and execution of Louisa Collins in New South Wales in 1889. In the book, Overington claims that Collins, who was tried four times for murder, suffered a miscarriage of justice and may well have been innocent. Overington linked the trial to Australian colonial history and to the early suffragette movement in Australia.

In 2017, Rebel Wilson successfully sued Bauer Media for defamation over eight articles, including one written by Overington, published in Woman's Day. Originally fined $4.6 million AUD, the Bauer Media company successfully reduced the damages on appeal to around $600,000.

Her book, Missing William Tyrrell (2020), concerns the real-life case of William Tyrrell, who disappeared from Kendall on the Mid North Coast of New South Wales in 2014. Overington has said she wrote the book because "now is not the time to give up" looking for him. The book was inspired by a 9-part Australian crime podcast called Nowhere Child she hosted on the Tyrrell case, produced by The Australian, that aired from July to September 2019.

In 2021, she was appointed literary editor at The Australian newspaper.

In 2022 Overington hosted three true crime documentaries for the Seven network: The Disappearance of William Tyrrell, Granny Killer: The Unsolved Murders and Murder in the Goldfields.

She has been a judge of The Vogel award for literature (2019); the Prime Minister's Literary Awards (2023), and The Australian Fiction Prize(2024).

== Personal life ==
Overington has homes in Bondi, Australia and Santa Monica, California.

== Awards and prizes ==
- 2004 – Joint winner of the Walkley Award for Investigative Journalism for the Norma Khouri Investigation
- 2006 – Awarded the second annual Sir Keith Murdoch Award for Journalism
- 2007 – Winner of the Walkley Award for Investigative Journalism for coverage of the AWB Kickback Scandal
- 2008 – Winner of the Blake Dawson Waldron Prize for Business Literature
- 2015 – Winner of the Davitt (Non-Fiction) Award for Crime Writing

== Works ==
=== Non-fiction ===
- Only in New York: How I took Manhattan (With the Kids). Allen & Unwin. 2006. ISBN 1741149614.
- Kickback: Inside the Australian Wheat Board Scandal. Allen & Unwin. 2007. ISBN 9781741751949.
- Last Woman Hanged. HarperCollins. 2014. ISBN 9780732299729.
- Missing William Tyrrell. HarperCollins. 2020. ISBN 9781460758687.

=== Fiction ===
- Ghost Child. Random House Australia. 2009. ISBN 9781863256803.
- I Came to Say Goodbye. Random House Australia. 2010. ISBN 9781864711578.
- Matilda is Missing. Bantam. 2011. ISBN 9781742750385.
- Sisters of Mercy. Bantam. 2012. ISBN 9781742750422.
- No Place Like Home. Random House Australia. 2013. ISBN 9781742758015.
- Can You Keep a Secret?. Random House Australia. 2014. ISBN 9780857983572.
- The One Who Got Away. HarperCollins. 2016. ISBN 9780732299743.
- The Lucky One. HarperCollins. 2017. ISBN 9780732299767.
- The Ones You Can Trust. HarperCollins. 2018. ISBN 9781460755822.
- One Chance. Audible Originals. 2021.
- The Cuckoo's Cry. HarperCollins. 2021. ISBN 9781460760499
- Looking for Eden. Audible Originals. 2023.
