= Jamaica (novel) =

2007 novel by Malcolm Knox

Jamaica : A Novel
- Author: Malcolm Knox
- Language: English
- Genre: novel
- Publisher: Allen & Unwin, Australia
- Publication date: 2007
- Publication place: Australia
- Media type: Print (Paperback)
- Pages: 388
- ISBN: 9781741753400
- Preceded by: A Private Man
- Followed by: The Life

Jamaica : A Novel (2007) is a novel by Australian author Malcolm Knox. It won the Colin Roderick Award in 2007, and was shortlisted for the Fiction category of the 2008 Prime Minister's Literary Awards.

== Plot summary ==
A group of six Australian friends - five white, middle-aged males and one female - combine to compete in a marathon relay swim in treacherous waters off Jamaica. But even before the race begins fractures appear in the relationships, with drug-taking, hidden secrets and personal crises coming to dominate.

== Notes ==
- Dedication: The Jamaica portrayed in these pages, and all those who exist there, are works of fiction. This book is dedicated to the facts who got out of the way of a good story.

== Reviews ==
- Patrick Ness in The Guardian found that "Alongside Tim Winton's Breath, this is the second excellent novel in as many months to examine masculinity and male friendship in Australian sport, a subject that might seem of limited intrinsic interest. But it's not the song, it's how it's sung, and if Winton is an aria, Knox is early Rolling Stone.."
- Andrew Reimner in The Sydney Morning Herald argues that "My reservations are not much more than quibbles. The pace, verve and stylishness of Jamaica outweigh any such shortcomings. Some sections are brilliantly done."

== Awards and nominations ==
- 2007 winner Colin Roderick Award
- 2008 shortlisted Prime Minister's Literary Awards — Fiction
