= Jim Daly (actor) =

Australian actor (born 1934)

- Born: July 11, 1944 (age 82); Adelaide, South Australia
- Education: Christian Brothers College, Adelaide; State College of Victoria; University of Adelaide; University of New England; University of Southern Queensland; Monash University
- Occupation: Actor
- Years active: 1955–present
- Agent: CMT Management
- Known for: Dugal in Pirate Islands
- Spouse: Joanna Daly (m. 1971)
- Children: Thomas Daly, Jeremy Daly, Hanna Woolley, Gabriella Daly

Jim Daly (born 1944) is an Australian actor, known for his role as Dugal in Pirate Islands.

== Biography ==
Jim worked professionally as a child, appearing in 'Let's Make an Opera' (The Little Sweep) under the direction of Dame Joanne Priest, and then regularly appearing on Dame Joanne's pioneering TV show 'Southern Stars' (Channel 9) in 1959 - 1960, before completing his secondary education and commencing teacher training.

He introduced Drama as a subject to St Michael's College, Henley Beach. He acted with the Adelaide Repertory Company, La Mama, and The Stage Company in Adelaide, returning to acting in 1984, leaving teaching. becoming 'professional' again. His theatre company, MOP, consisting of St Michael's old scholars was active from 1979 to 1983. The company alternated pub shows at The Black Lion hotel in Hindmarsh and major productions. He has lived in Melbourne since 1986 and has been represented by CMT Management for many years.

Jim has written a memoir titled 'Scenes Seen: An Actor's Life In Australia', which was self published in March 2025. Available here: https://jimdalyscenesseen.my.canva.site/

This website contains a Linktree which includes details of all Jim's acting projects and qualifications.

Jim holds a PhD on performing grotesquely. You can read the dissertation and view the related performance via the website/Linktree. Also view other performances on the various casting platforms.

Publications include:

- Daly, James Oliver (2019). ‘Antonin Artaud and The Grotesque.’ Ephemera, vol.2, no.3, December. Federal University of Ouro Preto, Brazil.
- Daly, Jim (2015). ‘The Grotesque and The Gothic in Peter King’s John Gabriel Borkman: a Reflection from the Inside.’ Australasian Drama Studies 66. April. 109–130.

== Filmography (short) ==
=== Film ===
- The Independent (2007)
- Inanimate Objects (2009)
- Red Hill (2010)

=== Television ===
- Utopia (2017) as Bert, Season 3, episode 6, Snouts in the Trough
- Pirate Islands (2003) as Dugal
- Thunderstone (1998–2000)
- The Games (Australian TV series) as (1998) Jim Wilson, Season 1, episode 4, Robbo and the 100 Metres
- Kangaroo Palace (1997) as Ted Rowlands
- Everynight ... Everynight (1994) as Barrett
