= Louisa Collins =

Australian convicted murderer

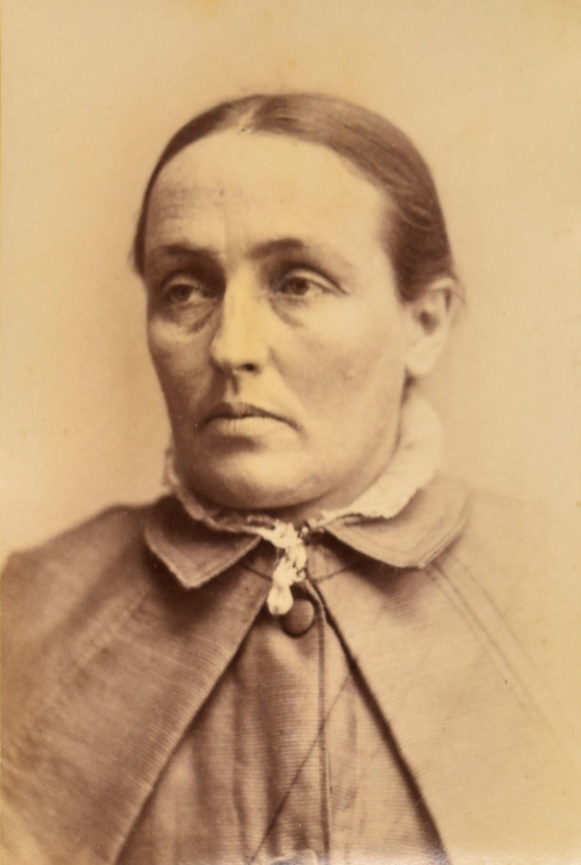
- Prisoner identification photograph of Louisa Collins, taken in July 1888
- Born: Louisa Hall; 11 August 1847 'Belltrees' station, near Scone, New South Wales, Australia
- Died: 8 January 1889 (aged 41); Darlinghurst, New South Wales, Australia
- Spouses: Charles Andrews; Michael Collins
- Children: 9 sons, 1 daughter
- Status: Executed
- Conviction: Murder
- Penalty: Death by hanging

Louisa Collins (née Hall; formerly Andrews; 11 August 1847 – 8 January 1889) was an Australian convicted murderer. She lived in the Sydney suburb of Botany and married twice, with both husbands dying of arsenic poisoning under suspicious circumstances. Collins was tried for murder on four separate occasions, with the first three juries failing to reach a verdict. At the fourth trial the jury delivered a guilty verdict for the murder of her second husband and she was sentenced to death. Collins was hanged at Darlinghurst Gaol on the morning of 8 January 1889. She was the last woman to be executed in New South Wales.

== Biography ==
=== Early life ===
Louisa Hall was born on 11 August 1847 at 'Belltrees' station on the Hunter River, near Scone in New South Wales. She was the fourth-born of nine children of Henry Hall and Catherine (née King). Louisa was baptised on 7 November 1847 in St. Luke's church in Scone. Her father, Henry Hall, was an agricultural labourer, born in Birmingham, England, who had arrived in Australia in 1832 as a convict aboard the vessel Asia. Louisa's mother, Catherine King, was a native of Dublin, Ireland, who emigrated to Australia in 1841 aboard the Fairlie. With four years of his sentence to complete, Hall obtained a ticket of leave and was granted permission to marry Catherine King; the couple were married at Scone in August 1842.

Louisa's early teenage years were described in the following terms: "With good looks, attractive presence, and winning ways, she was no sooner in her 'teens' than she developed all the qualities of a country coquette, and earned for herself the reputation of being a heartless flirt". As a consequence of her vivacious demeanour she "had many suitors and youthful sweethearts".

When Louisa Hall was aged about fourteen she found employment as a domestic servant for a solicitor at Merriwa, 30 miles (49 km) west of Scone.

=== Marriage to Andrews ===
In Merriwa Louisa met Charles Andrews, who was working as a butcher in the township. Andrews was 14 years older than Louisa and a widower (though he probably presented himself as a bachelor).^{[A]} Andrews began to court Louisa, in a match that was encouraged by her mother "who seemed to consider she had secured an excellent alliance for her daughter". Louisa's opinion of her suitor was much more tentative; she later stated, "I never liked, or cared for Andrews, although I didn't murder him". Louisa Hall and Charles Andrews were married at Merriwa in August 1865 (several weeks after Louisa's eighteenth birthday).

Louisa Andrews had nine children from the marriage, born between June 1867 and May 1883, two of whom died as young children. After the birth of her first child at Merriwa in 1867, accounts of Louisa's life state that she "took to drink". Her intemperate habits, described as "secret drinking", became a factor in the domestic discord that developed in the Andrews household. By 1871 the family had relocated to Muswellbrook. In December 1876 Andrews was granted a license by the local bench of magistrates to slaughter animals in his own yard. By 1877 Andrews had accumulated unmanageable debts and in January 1878 insolvency proceedings were initiated against him.

With Andrews in a precarious financial position, he relocated with his family to Sydney in order to find work. The family's first place of residence was "in Berry's paddock", near Ricketty Street in St. Peters, where Andrews was employed by John Sugden Berry, a bone-dust manufacturer. By May 1880, when Louisa's seventh child was baptised, the family were probably living near Moore Park and Charles was working as a carter. By about 1882 Charles Andrews had found work as a driver of drays with the woolscouring and fellmongering establishments operated by the Geddes brothers (trading as Messrs. T. Geddes and Co.), based at Botany (in areas known as Springvale and Floodvale). With Andrews working for the Geddes brothers, the family began living at No. 1 Pople's Terrace, in a swampy area of Botany known as 'Frog's Hollow'. They occupied one of two adjoining semi-detached cottages, in a row of similar four-roomed cottages running at right angles to Botany Road, separated from the Springvale woolwash by a small paddock and a creek. 'Frog Hollow' was a low-lying flat adjacent to the creek. Andrews was recognised as a hard worker and "a sober, honest, good-hearted, simple-minded man".

By about the mid-1880s Charles and Louisa Andrews began to take in boarders to ease their financial situation. In addition to themselves and the four children who remained in the household, there were often four or five boarders living in the small four-roomed cottage. From early in 1886, one of the boarders living in the house was Michael Peter Collins, known familiarly as 'Mick'. Collins was also employed by Messrs. T. Geddes and Co., primarily carting skins from the Glebe Island Abattoirs to the Botany tannery. Retrospective assessments of Louisa Andrews' character during this period emphasised the impropriety of her actions, stating she was prone to drinking to excess. The local police and neighbours reported "that she was seldom sober when at home". Louisa was "fond of dress and gaiety, and never dropped her habits of flirtation", with such behaviour often directed at her boarders. Many instances of arguments and domestic strife arose as a consequence of "Andrews remonstrating with his wife on her improper conduct" with Collins and other boarders.

A "great intimacy" developed between Louisa Andrews and Mick Collins and the pair were often seen together in surrounding bushland. Louisa was in the habit of meeting Collins on the tram, where they were witnessed kissing each other. With the relationship between the boarder and his wife becoming increasingly blatant, Andrews confronted and accused Louisa, who denied any wrongdoing. Despite the denials, Andrews eventually ordered Collins and the other boarders to leave the house, after which Collins found lodgings at a nearby boarding house. On 16 December 1886 Andrews returned home unexpectedly to find Collins sitting in his front room. Andrews flew into a rage and ejected Collins from the house and threatened to throw his wife into the street as well. Louisa took the matter to Constable George Jeffes, the watchhouse-keeper at Botany police station, who investigated what had happened but took no action, nor did any of the parties wish to instigate legal proceedings. As a result of this incident, Louisa "became enraged at her husband, and carried on her shameless doings with even greater energy".

Six weeks later Charles Andrews became gravely ill, with severe stomach pain and constant vomiting and diarrhoea. The patient was visited on several occasions by Dr. Thomas Martin, but the medicine he prescribed was to no avail. The doctor later testified that Louisa "seemed indifferent as to the fate" of her husband. Neighbours later commented that Louisa seemed certain her husband would die. During his illness she travelled to Sydney to have a will drawn up on behalf of her husband by a clerk in the insurance office; on the evening of 31 January the document was signed by Andrews and witnessed by two men from the neighbourhood. The will specified that all of Andrews' assets would go to his wife after his death. Apart from furniture and a small amount in a savings account, Andrews' assets consisted of a life insurance policy with the Mutual Life Association of Australasia, with a potential worth of two hundred pounds.

Charles Andrews died on the afternoon of 2 February 1887. Shortly after he expired, Louisa sent her daughter May to fetch a neighbour named Mary Law. Soon after Mrs. Law arrived, Louisa left the house to catch a tram to Sydney to "see the insurance people". Leaving her husband's body on a stretcher in the Pople's Terrace cottage, Louisa travelled to Sydney to inform the bank and the insurance company of his death. On her return she called at the house of Mrs. Ellen Price, to ask for her assistance to prepare her husband's body for burial. Louisa then sent her son Arthur to Dr. Martin to obtain a death certificate. The cause of Andrews' death was recorded as "acute gastritis".

=== Marriage to Collins ===
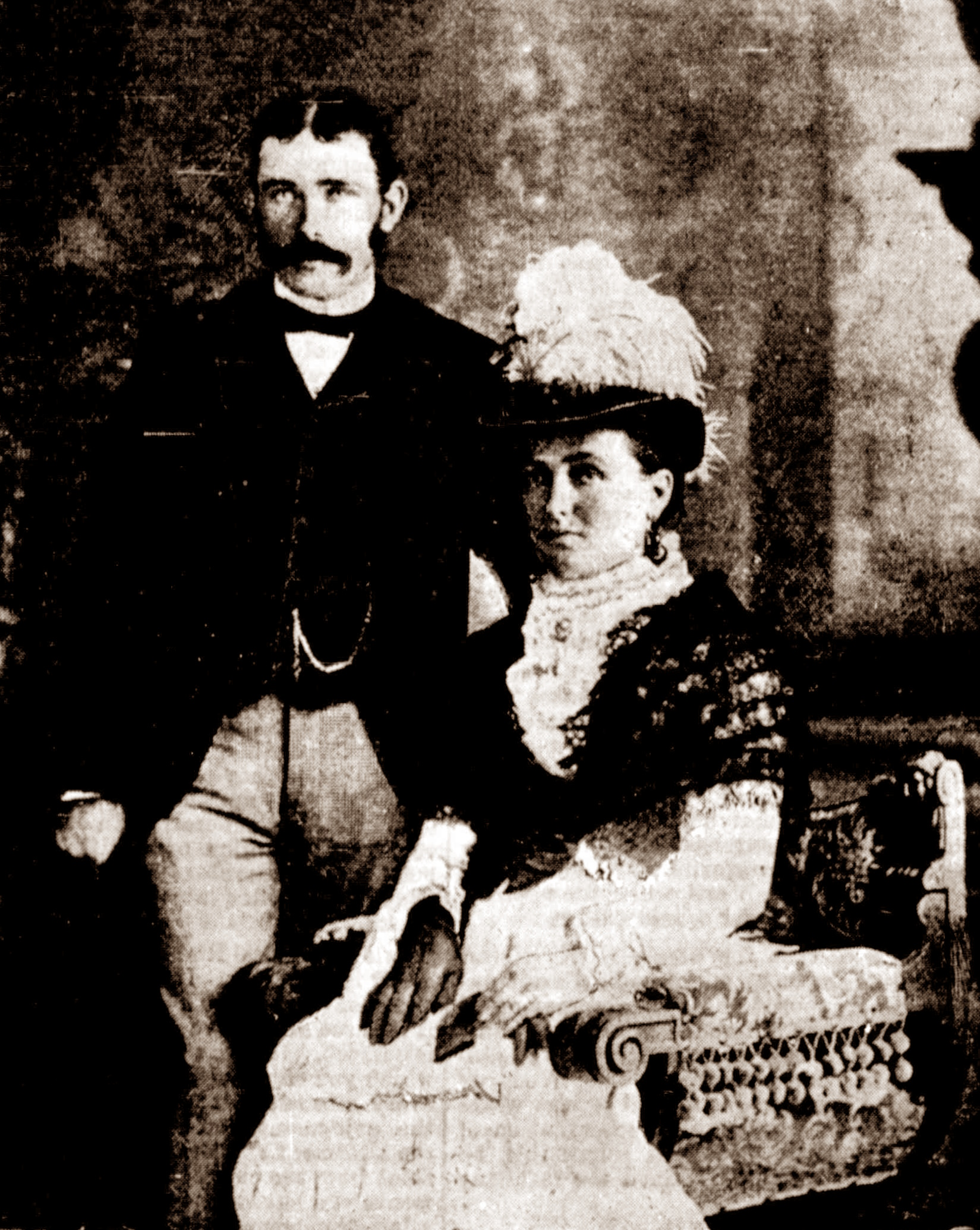
Wedding photograph of Michael and Louisa Collins, April 1887.

Charles Andrews was buried at Rookwood Cemetery on 5 February 1887. Three days later Louisa approached the savings bank in Sydney requesting withdrawal of the balance left to her in her late husband's will. About a week after the burial Mick Collins moved back into the Pople's Terrace cottage. The neighbour Mrs. Law later recalled seeing them arm-in-arm "as if already married". With the money from the bank, Louisa cleared Collins' gambling debts and bought him a new watch and chain and a suit of clothes, as well as new furniture for the house. After her husband's death, Louisa moved with her family from Pople's Terrace to a cottage in Johnson's Lane in North Botany. However, within weeks of moving she "expressed an unaccountable burning desire to again occupy her old residence; even going so far as to offer a premium to the occupier if she would vacate the cottage in her favor". When this was unsuccessful, Louisa rented a cottage at the rear of her former home at 'Frog Hollow' (No. 5 Pople's Terrace).

Louisa Andrews and Michael Collins were married on 9 April 1887 at St. Silas' Anglican church near the Waterloo tram terminus, just three months after Louisa's first husband's death. On the marriage registration Louisa was recorded as a widow, aged 28 years (though she was actually aged 39 at the time). Michael Collins' age was recorded as 26 years. The couple took no witnesses to church with them and their wedding vows were witnessed by available members of the parsonage.

After their marriage Mick and Louisa Collins lived in "an indolent, unsatisfactory manner, the wife always drinking, and the husband helping to spend what little money there was". Collins had an intermittent work record, with extended periods of unemployment and his gambling activities further depleted the family resources. On 28 November 1887 Louisa gave birth to her tenth child, a son named John. In April 1888 the infant began to suffer from stomach pains. Louisa treated her son with castor oil, but the child died late at night on 10 April. Dr. Martin was summoned; after examining the baby's corpse he filed a report for the Coroner, stating that the child had been "constitutionally delicate". The Coroner concluded that the child had "suffered slightly from a sick stomach two days previous to its death", but "as there are no grounds for supposing this child died from any but natural causes, an inquest may be dispensed with". Ellen Price was again called upon, to prepare the infant's body for burial. Mrs. Price later recalled that she was "amazed by the child's swollen lips and tongue" and noted "the same callousness" was exhibited by Louisa that she had seen after Andrews had died. John Collins was buried in the paupers' section of Rookwood Cemetery.

At about this time Louisa's eldest son, Herbert, who was living and working at Maitland, first heard the news of his father's death. When he arrived at the Botany cottage he discovered his mother had remarried and found his younger siblings "dirty and uncared-for, playing about the untidy house". When Herbert enquired about an inheritance from his father, Louisa told him she had spent all the money Andrews had left her. Herbert was taken aback at the turn of events, and pointed out that "had his mother given him his share of the money he might have opened a small business in Botany or Waterloo, and helped her to live and keep the children in comparative ease and comfort". It was reported that as a result of these interactions, Louisa disowned her son, who then returned to his employment at Maitland.

By June 1887 Mick Collins was again working for Geddes and Sons, carting skins from the slaughter yards at Glebe Island to the Botany tannery. On 23 June, feeling ill, he dismounted from the cart and vomited by the roadside; after further symptoms of diarrhoea and stomach pain, he returned home and took to his sick-bed. On 28 July Mick and Louisa travelled on the tram to Sydney, where Mick was seen by Dr. George Marshall in his Elizabeth Street rooms. Marshall diagnosed "malaise preceding an attack of fever" and prescribed a number of medicines. Over the next several days, Collins' condition deteriorated. On 2 July Louisa returned to Dr. Marshall's rooms and requested he return with her to Botany to examine her husband again.

Dr. Marshall visited Michael Collins in his sick-bed at Pople's Terrace on three occasions over the next five days. On the third occasion, on the evening of 7 July, he arrived in company with Dr. Martin, who had ministered to Charles Andrews in the last days of his life. The two doctors were friends and had "compared notes" about their patients, and were struck by the similarities between the cases. Dr. Marshall began to suspect that the cause of Mick Collins' illness was poisoning. When they arrived at the cottage the patient was "in a very bad state indeed". When they left, both doctors went to the Botany police station to report their suspicions. Constable Jeffes and Senior-constable Abraham Sherwood arrived at the cottage just after eleven that night. They questioned Collins, but elicited no response that supported their suspicion he was being poisoned. Doctors Marshall and Martin made another visit at midday on 8 July, finding the patient close to death with barely a pulse. Michael Collins died at about three o'clock that afternoon, soon after which Louisa sent her son Arthur to take the tram to Sydney to obtain a death certificate from Dr. Marshall.

When Constable Jeffes learned of Collins' death, he and Senior-constable Sherwood visited the house to confirm this was the case. When returning to the police station they met Arthur, who told them that the doctors had refused to issue a death certificate. Jeffes then returned to the cottage with Arthur and proceeded to collect any medicines and substances he could find in the household, as well as the clothes worn by the deceased. Louisa was distraught and threatened to leave the cottage, but Jeffes ordered her to remain. A police officer was placed at the front door during the night.

=== The inquests ===
Twenty-eight hours after Michael Collins' death, an autopsy was carried out on his body at the South Sydney Morgue by Dr. Frederick Milford, with Dr. Marshall in attendance. Milford concluded that the cause of death was peritonitis, "which might have been caused by the use internally of some noxious drug, and possibly from natural causes". His opinion was that the death had been "lingering and protracted". The stomach and its contents, as well as excised sections of liver and kidney, were placed in jars for chemical analysis by the Government Analyst. An inquest was commenced at the morgue on 10 July 1888 before the City Coroner, Henry Shiell, and a jury. Dr. Marshall described the various interactions he had with the deceased man over the course of his illness and Dr. Milford testified to the results of the autopsy. After the first day the inquest was adjourned to await the results of the investigation by the Government Analyst.

On the afternoon of 12 July the Government Analyst, William Hamlet, informed the Coroner that his examination of the deceased man's stomach and other organs had revealed "a large quantity of arsenic, sufficient to cause death". Shiell then issued a warrant for the arrest of Louisa Collins, on suspicion of having caused the death of her husband. She was apprehended at her residence at eight o'clock that evening. The following day Shiell issued warrants for the exhumation of the bodies of Louisa's first husband, Charles Andrews, as well as the infant, John Collins, who had died the previous April. On Saturday 14 July another inquest was commenced at the South Sydney Morgue on the bodies of Louisa's first husband and her child by her second husband. On the first day evidence was given by the undertaker's employee and Dr. Martin, who had attended to Charles Andrews during his illness and issued the death certificate. The inquiry was then adjourned to allow time for the Government Analyst to examine "the viscera taken from the bodies".

The inquest into Michael Collins's death resumed on 17 July, during which evidence was given by Dr. Martin, a neighbour named Johanna Bartington living at No. 10 Pople's Terrace, and the policemen, Constable Jeffes and Senior-constable Sherwood. The Government Analyst, William Hamlet, also presented his evidence. Hamlet found that Collins' stomach and liver contained arsenic and the organs themselves presented "the appearance of arsenical poisoning". He also found traces of arsenic in samples collected from the cottage by Constable Jeffes soon after Collins had died: a tumbler of milk "and some thickening matter" and bottles of urine and "vomited matter". After Hamlet's testimony, the Coroner addressed the jury, stating it had been established that the deceased died from arsenical poisoning, but "the question now is, by whom was it administered?". The inquest was then adjourned until 20 July, but owing to the illness of the City Coroner, it was later adjourned for a further six days.

When the inquest into Michael Collins' death resumed on 26 July, Louisa's son Arthur Andrews, as well as other residents of Botany, gave evidence "in which the facts brought out in the earlier part of the inquiry were corroborated". Louisa Collins also presented evidence, after being cautioned by the Coroner. During his summation of the evidence given at the inquest, Shiell described the widow's testimony as a "long rambling statement", the object of which was to make it appear as if the deceased had poisoned himself by taking small doses of arsenic, "and thereby caused his own death". After a short deliberation the jury returned a verdict that Collins had "met his death by arsenical poisoning, that poison being administered by his wife, Louisa Collins". The Coroner expressed his concurrence with the verdict and committed Collins to stand trial for her husband's wilful murder.

The inquest into the deaths of Louisa's first husband, Charles Andrews, and her young son by her second marriage, John Collins, was resumed on 3 August. Louisa Collins appeared on a writ of habeas corpus, guarded by warders from Darlinghurst Gaol. One of the witnesses was the Government Analyst, William Hamlet, who gave testimony regarding his examination of the samples taken from the exhumed bodies. He found no evidence of poison in the samples taken from the child's body, but detected a minute trace of arsenic in the stomach contents from Andrews' remains. The inquiry concluded on the following day, 4 August. In his summing up, the Coroner instructed the jury to "exclude from their thoughts the child John Collins", who must be considered to have died from natural causes. However, in the case of Charles Andrews the Coroner stated that "very few could doubt" that he died from "arsenical poisoning". He exhibited the symptoms consistent with that cause and, even though arsenic is typically "eliminated by vomiting and purging", traces of the poison were found in his remains. The Coroner instructed the jury to ask themselves "by whom was the poison administered and who had an interest in giving the drug to him". After deliberating for ten minutes the jury returned a verdict that Andrews had "met his death by arsenical poisoning, and further, that the poison was administered by his wife". The Coroner then committed Louisa Collins to stand trial for the wilful murder of her first husband.

=== Trials ===
==== First trial ====
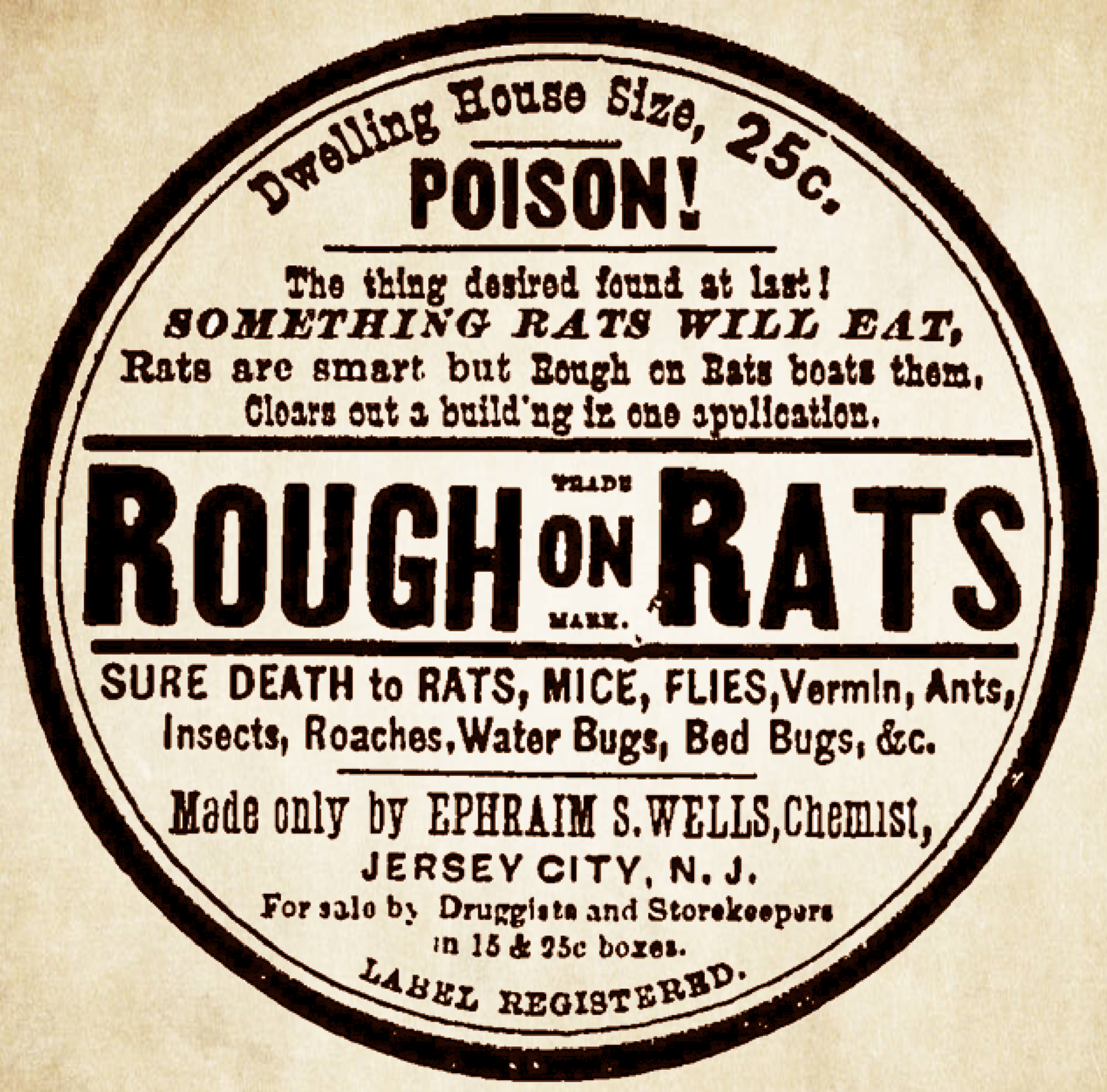
'Rough on Rats', upper label.

Louisa Collins was tried before Justice William Foster in the Central Criminal Court for the murder of her second husband, Michael Collins. The trial was held over three successive days, beginning on 6 August 1888. The evidence presented was largely consistent with that which was given at the coronial inquest. The defendant's eleven-year-old daughter, May Andrews, had not given a statement to the inquest, but took the stand on the second day of the trial. The young child told the court that on the night of her step-father's death she was dusting a shelf in the kitchen when she noticed a small box was missing that she had seen there previously. The box had a picture of a rat on the side and was labelled 'Rough on Rats'. May testified that she had seen a box like this only once before, "just before her own father (Andrews) took ill, and when they lived in another house". In later evidence, the Government Analyst, William Hamlet, explained that the preparation known as 'Rough on Rats' contained "between 96 and 97 per cent of white arsenic" and, up to that time, the preparation could be readily purchased in grocery shops.^{[B]}

After the presentation of evidence, the respective addresses to the jury began on the early evening of 7 August. The defence barrister acknowledged that Michael Collins had died from "arsenical poisoning", but argued that the Crown had failed to show any motive for Louisa Collins "to commit the terrible crime" and asked the jurists to consider the possibility that the deceased had committed suicide. The address by the Crown prosecutor rebutted "the idea of suicide", pointing out that "the doctors' evidence showed that the poison had been administered in small doses on different occasions, that the deceased was in great pain for days, and continually vomiting, and that it would be absurd to suppose that he would, in committing suicide, submit himself to a week of torture".

The judge's summation was completed by one o'clock on 8 August, after which the jury retired to consider their verdict. Later that afternoon the jury returned to the Court and the foreman stated that the jury had "found it impossible to agree, and would not be likely to do so even if they were locked up for a week". Justice Foster replied that "he would willingly release them if he could" but explained that by law he was compelled to lock up a jury for twelve hours before he could discharge them. The jury were then locked up for the night. The next morning the jurors were recalled to the Court, where the foreman reiterated that the jury "were almost equally divided" and it was impossible for them to arrive at a verdict. Justice Foster then discharged the jury and remanded Collins to appear at the next sittings of the Court in October.

==== Second trial ====
Louisa Collins was re-tried for the murder of her second husband in a trial which commenced in the Central Criminal Court on 5 November 1888, presided over by Justice William Windeyer. The trial was held over three successive days. On the final day, 7 November, after addresses by counsels for the defence and prosecution, Justice Windeyer summed up the case. The judge declared that "the theory of suicide" and "the proposition that the poison had been absorbed by the deceased whilst pursuing his ordinary daily avocation" were each incompatible with the evidence, but concluded by advising the jurists "to give the prisoner the benefit of any reasonable doubt they had in their minds". That evening the foreman reported that the jury were unable to agree to a verdict. The jury was locked up for the night and discharged the following day.

==== Third trial ====
Twelve days after the second unsuccessful prosecution of Louisa Collins for the murder of Michael Collins, a trial was commenced for the murder of her first husband, Charles Andrews, presided over by Justice Joseph Innes. This trial encompassed three successive days, from 19 to 21 November 1888. The only witness called by the defence was Alexander Geddes, Andrews' former employer. Geddes testified that Andrews had been employed to wash the sheep skins after the wool had been removed and that some of the skins had been "treated by squatters with arsenic before they reached his hands". He explained that some of the men in his employment had suffered from sore hands through handling of the skins, though he was not aware of Andrews suffering in that way. After questioning by the judge, Geddes stated that in the 19 years of carrying on business, "he had never known of a really serious case of illness through poisoning". In a result similar to the first two trials, the jury were unable to agree upon a verdict and were discharged after being locked up for the night.

==== Fourth trial ====
After the third trial, a fourth trial was ordered, with the Crown returning to its original case and prosecuting Louisa Collins for the third time for the wilful murder of her second husband, Michael Collins. According to the convention at the time, "when two juries disagreed the Crown would abandon prosecution", so a third trial for the same crime was a sensational development. The fourth trial commenced on 5 December 1888 before the Chief Justice of New South Wales, Sir Frederick Darley.

On the second day of the trial Michael Collins' former employer, Thomas Geddes, deposed that Collins had been employed by him "on and off for a period of three years", carting sheep skins from the Glebe Island abattoirs. Geddes testified that the skins were not prepared with arsenic, nor was arsenic used in his fellmongering yard at Botany.

The jury retired at noon on the final day of the trial, 8 December, and returned to court two hours later with a verdict of guilty of wilful murder. Justice Darley, in passing sentence, commented that the murder of Michael Collins was "one of peculiar atrocity", adding: "You watched his slow torture and painful death, and this apparently without a moment's remorse". The judge then passed a sentence of death upon the prisoner.

An editorial in Sydney's Evening News newspaper expressed its approval of Collins' conviction, claiming there was a prevailing widespread fear "that through the disagreements of juries the perpetrator of two deliberate and atrocious murders might ultimately escape the punishment her crimes deserve". After her conviction the Evening News began to liken Louisa Collins to the historical figure, Lucrezia Borgia, occasionally referring to her as 'The Botany Borgia' or 'The Modern Borgia'. A January 1889 article in that newspaper described both women as "cold-blooded murderesses", but drew a sharp distinction, insofar as Lucrezia Borgia was "a woman of education, of superior attainments, and a lover of high art, while her modern imitator was a coarse, illiterate woman, and a drunkard".

=== Appeal and pleas for mercy ===
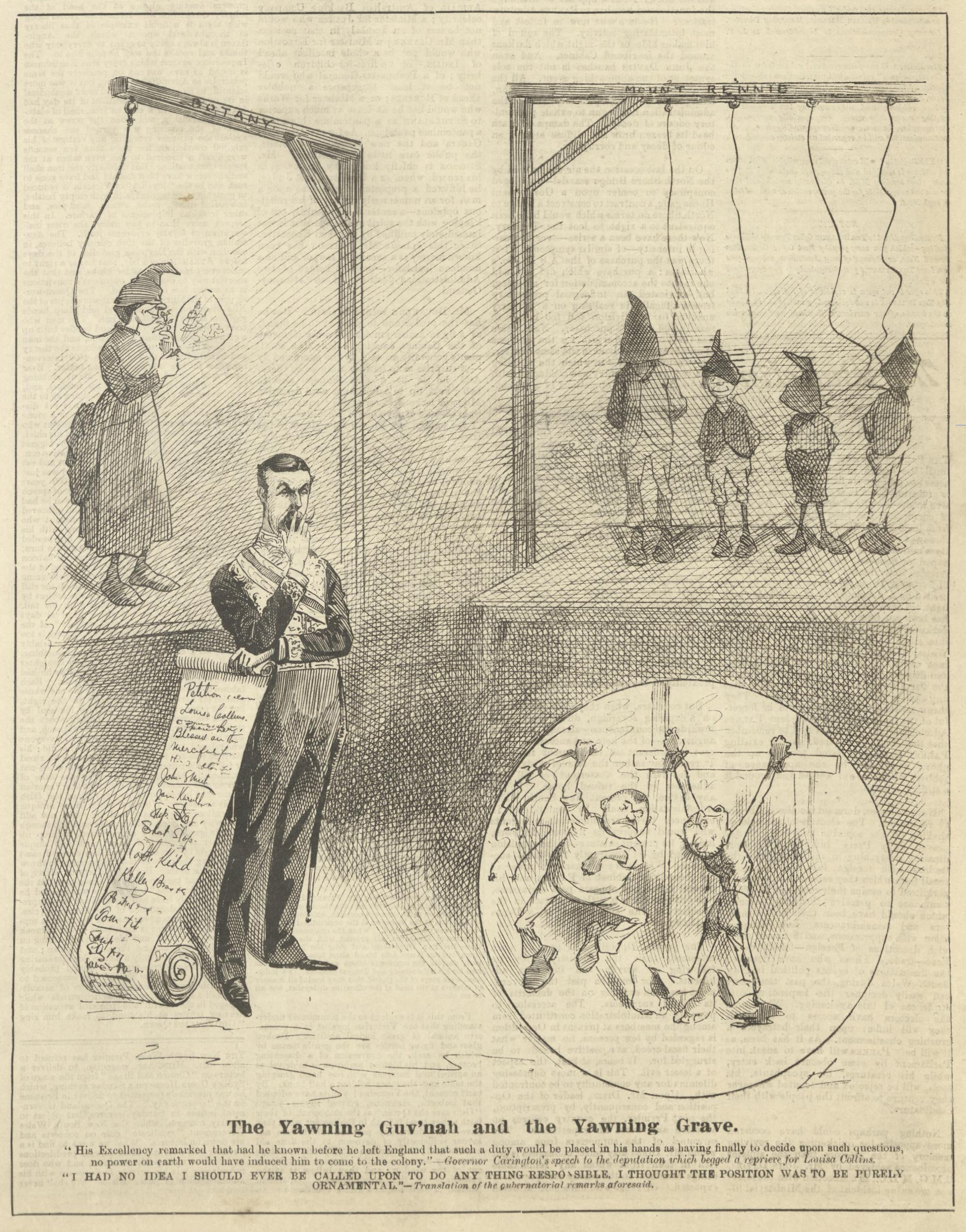
'The Yawning Guv'nah and the Yawning Grave', a cartoon critical of the Governor of New South Wales, Charles Carington, referencing the hangings of Louisa Collins and the 'Mount Rennie' rapists; published in The Bulletin, 12 January 1889.

Following the trial "a writ of error to quash the conviction" was submitted by Collins' defence counsel on the following grounds: (1) "that all the evidence admitted relative to the death of Charles Andrews was improperly admitted", and (2) that one of the jurymen had received and read a telegram during the trial. The appeal was heard on 29 December before the Full Bench of the Supreme Court, consisting of the three judges who had presided over each of the earlier trials for the murder of Michael Collins – Justices Foster and Windeyer and Chief Justice Darley. The appeal failed on both counts. Darley pointed out that during the trial over which he presided, "the evidence did not go beyond the fact that Andrews died of arsenical poisoning" and that no motive for his death had been discussed before the jury. In regard to the telegram, it was determined it was "of an innocent nature" and had no bearing on the case.

By this time, after the extensive newspaper coverage of the case, there was widespread public debate regarding the death sentence imposed on Louisa Collins, with arguments both for and against a reprieve. A number of petitions calling for mercy were sent to the New South Wales Governor. On 3 January 1889 the Executive Council considered the case of Louisa Collins, but deferred their final decision. That evening a public meeting was held at the Sydney Town Hall, convened by a group of men that included members of the New South Wales parliament, for the purpose of forestalling the execution of Louisa Collins. The meeting carried a motion calling for commutation of the death sentence passed upon Collins and a deputation was formed to present a memorial to the Governor, Charles Carington, urging him to extend the royal prerogative of mercy to the prisoner.

The Executive Council held a special meeting on 4 January to consider the implications of the "large number of memorials, petitions, police reports, and other correspondence" relating to the Collins' case. In the end the Council decided unanimously to confirm their previous decision that the law should be allowed to take its course. That afternoon Governor Carington received the deputation from the Town Hall meeting of the previous evening, at the conclusion of which the Governor informed them that it was his duty "to accept the advice tendered to me by the Ministers of the Crown, and I with deep sorrow have to refuse to interfere with the sentence of the Court". During his response to the deputation, the Governor told them "had I known before I left England that such a duty would be cast upon me... no power on earth would have induced me to come here".

On 7 January the condemned woman herself wrote a final appeal to Governor Carington, in which she "drew attention to the extreme circumstances and hardship of her case". Later that morning two of Louisa's daughters (one of whom was May Andrews, who had given evidence for the Crown), attended Government House to personally seek a reprieve from the Governor. Carington requested that his secretary receive them and "convey his decision, painful as it was".

=== Execution ===
Louisa Collins was executed on the morning of 8 January 1889, upon the gallows within Darlinghurst Gaol. About an hour before her execution, Collins was removed from the female ward to the condemned cell, situated nearby to the gallows. She passed her last hour in prayer with Rev. Canon Rich, the chaplain of the gaol. At a few minutes past nine o'clock the condemned woman emerged with her arms pinioned above the elbows, flanked by two female warders and accompanied by the chaplain. Robert Howard, the executioner, and his newly-appointed assistant, followed the group onto the gallery leading to the scaffold. Witnesses to the execution were restricted to "those whom duty compels to be present" such as gaol officials and medical attendants, as well as one representative from each of the five metropolitan newspapers.

After a short prayer from the chaplain, Howard placed the white cap over Collins' head and the rope was tightened around her neck. The executioner then signalled to his assistant to pull the lever to release the trapdoor, but the handle could not be moved. On investigation it was found that the pin holding the handle in place "was fast in its slot". The assistant then tried to remove the pin but failed, and a number of blows with a mallet were required before the pin gave way. While this was happening, Collins stood on the scaffold "perfectly upright and motionless".

When the pin was removed, the lever was pulled and the trapdoor opened. The condemned woman's body "fell through in a slightly curved position". After initially swinging to one side the body hung motionless, indicating that death had been instantaneous. Immediately afterwards, however, "a slight spurt of blood" was noticed by the witnesses below, followed by "a thin stream which ran down the dress and spotted the floor beneath". Later examination revealed that the force of the drop had opened the woman's neck and torn her windpipe, with "the head appearing to only hang by the vertebrae of the neck". After hanging for twenty minutes the corpse was lowered onto a wicker bier and conveyed to the inquest room. That afternoon Collins' remains were buried at Rookwood Cemetery under the supervision of police authorities.

The hanging of Louisa Collins at Darlinghurst Gaol was the last execution of a woman to be carried out in New South Wales.

== The victims ==
- Charles Andrews – born in August 1833 at Aldbourne, county Wiltshire in England, the son of Richard Andrews and Charlotte (née Everfield). In June 1848 Andrews immigrated to Sydney with his parents and six siblings aboard the Canton. The Andrews family settled in the Waterloo borough in Sydney. Charles' father was "a collector of curios and odds and ends", with a shop in Botany Road. Charles Andrews found work as a carter at Botany for one of the sons of Simeon Lord. During this period of his life, Andrews was married and had one child, a son, born in about 1853. His wife died and his son was raised in Victoria by relatives of the boy's mother. From the mid-1850s land at Botany from the Lord estate began to be resumed for construction of the Botany waterworks pumping-station, after which Andrews "went up country". By about the early 1860s Andrews was living at Merriwa, working as a butcher. The remainder of his life is covered in the article above.
- Michael Peter Collins – born in about 1859, the son of James Collins, a farmer from Ballarat in Victoria, and his wife, Margaret (née Lenihan). By the mid-1880s Mick Collins had become well-known the Botany district of Sydney, "but was not looked upon with much respect". He was considered to be "a man of irregular habits, and exhibited no desire to work". When he did work, Collins was employed at the wool-washing and fellmongering facilities operated by the Geddes family at Botany. The rest of his life is detailed in the article above.

== Publications ==
The first full-length examination of the case, Last Woman Hanged: the Terrible True Story of Louisa Collins, by Australian author and journalist Caroline Overington, was published in 2014.

A novel, The Killing of Louisa by Janet Lee, was published by the University of Queensland Press (UQP) in 2018.

== Notes ==
A.When Andrews and Louisa Hall were married at Merriwa, the groom's details were recorded as: Charles Andrews, a bachelor, following the occupation of a butcher and residing at Merriwa. The bride's details were: Louisa Hall, spinster, domestic servant residing at Merriwa. Although Andrews probably "declared himself to be a bachelor" when living at Merriwa, those who knew him in his earlier life in Sydney were reported to "positively assert that he was a widower".

B.'Rough on Rats' was a poisonous compound with white arsenic (arsenic trioxide) as its active substance, developed in the United States by Ephraim Stockton Wells (1841–1913) in the early 1870s. The product was advertised as a poison against all kinds of vermin. 'Rough on Rats' began to be marketed in Australia in 1883. The poison was readily available from grocery stores in New South Wales until early 1888. From March that year sales of 'Rough on Rats' began to be restricted, after it was proclaimed a poison under the Sale and Use of Poisons Act.
