= Forbidden Lies =

- Produced by: Anna Broinowski; Lisa Duff; Sally Regan; Antonio Zeccola
- Cinematography: Kathryn Milliss; Toby Oliver
- Edited by: Alison Croft
- Release date: September 2007
- Running time: 104 minutes
- Country: Australia
- Languages: English; Arabic

Forbidden Lie$ is an Australian documentary released in September 2007. It was directed by Anna Broinowski.

It documents an investigation into the 2003 novel Forbidden Love (United States title: Honor Lost: Love and Death in Modern Day Jordan) written by Norma Khouri. The novel was published in 16 countries and sold between 250,000 and 550,000 copies around the world.

Broinowski stated that her interest in the story came when details about Khouri's past in the United States were revealed.

== Synopsis ==
The documentary opens by depicting Norma Khouri, author of the book Forbidden Love, which is purportedly the true story of "Dalia" – a young Muslim woman in Jordan murdered by her family in an honor killing because of her affair with a Christian soldier – as a woman bravely exposing a brutal and true story.

Her account is then challenged by multiple people, including Jordanian women Rana Husseini, a journalist for The Jordan Times and an expert in honor killings in Jordan; Dr. Amal A. Sabbagh, a member of the National Committee for Women in Jordan; and Australian journalist Malcolm Knox.

Khouri's critics first take issue with her representations of Muslim women as victims with no control over their lives as being assumptive, baseless, and insulting to Arab Muslim women.

The book is then challenged on the basis that many 'facts' in Khouri's story were asserted to be incorrect or unfounded, including statements about geography (such as the run of the Jordan River through Amman, and the countries bordering Jordan) and restrictions requiring women to wear the hijab and have a male escort when they travel outside the home (contrary to depictions of women walking unescorted and uncovered).

It is also noted that no business owners on the street where Dalia was said to have been killed remembers such a crime ever happening, and unisex salons do not exist in Jordan.

In regards to the supposed aftermath, an ambulance would not have taken Dalia's body away as the police attend to a murder scene, and Dalia's father (her murderer) could not have remained out on bail pending his prosecution because murderers in Jordan are not given bail; further, honor killings are also not tried in Shariah court.

On one hand, parts of the Palestine hospital where Khouri claimed Dalia's body had been taken were found to match writeups in the book, but others are incorrect, including her description of a basement, dimly lit hallways, and the morgue having the capacity to hold four beds.

Finally, chronological errors were discovered in her descriptions of activities occurring in the book, including a brand of cigarettes, the bills used, and the Hyatt hotel, none of which existed in Jordan at the time of the alleged murder. Dalia, Michael and Khouri also claimed to have met in a cafe in 1996, but it did not open until 1997, and in any case, the cafe owner did not recognise a photo of Dalia and Khouri.

As the film progresses, it reveals inconsistencies and allegations against her unrelated to Forbidden Love, including the theft of hundreds of thousands of dollars in bonds from an elderly neighbor in Chicago, and her claim to have donated book profits to International Women's organizations in Jordan.

Khouri is learned to have also lied about her real name, being married with two children, and about living in Jordan during the periods when the alleged events in the novel took place: in fact, she has lived in the United States for much of her life.

In spite of these errors, Khouri maintained her writing to be factual and a platform to illuminate the infringement on women's rights in the Arab world over the honor killings that occur largely unseen by the Western world.

To defend her novel, Khouri journeyed with the filmmakers to Jordan to prove Dalia and her murder were real. With Khouri unwilling to disclose specific information about Dalia on camera, the documentary's director allows her do so off camera.

Khouri's allegations fail to find support in official Jordanian records, which she counters with the charge identifying details were altered to protect innocent people from reprisal. After initially saying Dalia was slain in Amman, Khouri is forced to "reveal" that it actually was in Irbid, and also changes when the murder occurred, shifting the events from the 1990s to 2001; this timing proves to be critical because that would mean the killing of Dalia took place after Khouri had already written most of her manuscript.

Once Khouri returns from Jordan without finding concrete evidence to back up her claims, the documentary explores allegations against Khouri personally. Investigative journalist Caroline Overington is told by Chicago police they believe her to be a con woman involved in extensive insurance fraud. They suggest Khouri and her husband fled the FBI who were investigating her in the US, while her best friend and her mother-in-law claim to be afraid of her. Her husband John is alleged to have connections with the mafia, which he denies.

The film also investigates Khouri's former neighbor Mary in Chicago, from whom it is alleged she stole cash bonds and large sums of money. Khouri denies having received Mary's money illegitimately, and also shifts some blame for stealing to her Greek mother-in-law and her husband, John Toliopoulos, even as he constantly champions for her throughout the film.

Toliopoulos expresses hopes for rejoining his wife in America; this is inter-cut with Khouri stating their marriage has been over for some time. Khouri claims to have been abused by her husband and to have been sexually molested as a child by her father.

The tone of the documentary is skeptical. Storied events from the novel are reenacted, sometimes altered on screen or juxtaposed with narrative to reflect the differences between Khouri's claims and the 'truth' being asserted. In one scene, Dalia's brutal murder is played backwards on screen, ending with the actors in the scene rising, leaving and laughing, including the actor playing Dalia.

The film draws to a close with Khouri having admitted no wrongdoing and still living apart from her husband. The closing titles indicate that the FBI continues to investigate allegations against Khouri, as she claims to aspire to become a human rights attorney.

== Reception ==
=== Awards and nominations ===
On 22 January 2008, Forbidden Lie$ won Best Documentary in the Australian Film Critics Association awards for 2007.

On 24 April 2008, Forbidden Lie$ won the "Golden Al Jazeera award" for a long film at the 4th annual Al Jazeera Documentary Festival.

On 16 October 2008, Forbidden Lie$ won Best Documentary and special prize of Cinema Historians and Critics Guildin of Russia in the Kazan International festival of Muslim Cinema awards for 2008.

Other awards won:

• Writers Guild of America Best Non-Fiction screenplay award

•San Francisco International Film Festival Golden Gate Awards Special Jury Prize

•The Rome Film Festival 'Cult' Award for Best Documentary

•2 x AFI Awards

•The NSW Premier's Literary Award

•The Film Critics' Circle of Australia

=== Box office ===
Forbidden Lie$ grossed $401,027 Australian dollars at the box office in Australia.

=== Reviews ===
On Rotten Tomatoes, the film has an aggregate score of 91% based on 31 positive and 3 negative critic reviews. The Website consensus reads: "A thrilling and complex documentary about an international con-artist that's as confounded with the distinction between truth and lies as its wildly believable (and equally untrustworthy) subject."

Kenneth Turan of the Los Angeles Times wrote that "The best thing [about the film] is the way it puts your sense of reality into jeopardy" and that "By showing Khouri in action, [...] it allows us to understand how and why these people have such a hold on the unwary."

Richard Kuipers of Variety wrote that the film had an "entertaining first hour" but that he lost interest in the later parts.

== See also ==
- Cinema of Australia
- Forbidden Love (novel)
