= List of 2007 box office number-one films in Australia =

This is a list of films which placed number-one at the box office in Australia during 2007. Amounts are in Australian dollars. Also included are the positions at the box office other films opened at. Quite a number of these are films from the previous year due to normal Australian film distribution delays. The number a film opens at does not necessarily denote its highest placement at the box office, but is intended as an indication and a guide to what theatrically released films opened and when.

== Number-one films ==
†	This implies the highest-grossing movie of the year.

#	Week ending	Film	Box office	Openings
1	3 January 2007	Happy Feet	$10,757,456	
2	10 January 2007	Happy Feet	$6,670,578	Blood Diamond (#5), Flicka (#12)
3	17 January 2007	The Pursuit of Happyness	$5,124,284	Apocalypto (#7), Arthur and the Invisibles (#11), Guru (#19)
4	24 January 2006	Déjà Vu	$3,593,058	Dreamgirls (#5), Pan's Labyrinth (#15)
5	31 January 2007	Epic Movie	$3,854,240	Miss Potter (#4), Breaking and Entering (#17), Salaam-e-Ishq: A Tribute to Love (#19), The Fountain (#20)
6	7 February 2007	Miss Potter	$1,510,366	Stranger Than Fiction (#5), The Last King of Scotland (#13), Perfume: The Story of a Murderer (#15)
7	14 February 2007	Miss Potter	$1,140,201	Hannibal Rising (#2), Smokin' Aces (#5), Music and Lyrics (#6), Employee of the Month (#13), Little Children (#17), Tenacious D in The Pick of Destiny (#20)
8	21 February 2007	Ghost Rider	$3,115,443	Notes on a Scandal (#3), The Good Shepherd (#4)
9	28 February 2007	Rocky Balboa	$2,724,994	Norbit (#2), Letters from Iwo Jima (#12)
10	7 March 2007	Music and Lyrics	$1,461,791	The Illusionist (#6), Man of the Year (#7)
11	14 March 2007	Wild Hogs	$4,500,865	Bobby (#8), The Hitcher (#10), The Good German (#15)
12	21 March 2007	Wild Hogs	$3,404,028	Hot Fuzz (#2), Bra Boys (#4), Razzle Dazzle: A Journey into Dance (#5), Scoop (#6)
13	28 March 2007	Wild Hogs	$2,863,477	Freedom Writers (#3), TMNT (#4), Reign Over Me (#7), Namastey London (#20)
14	4 April 2007	Mr. Bean's Holiday	$5,334,859	Meet the Robinsons (#3), Becoming Jane (#5), The Lives of Others (#9), Happily N'Ever After (#14), Running with Scissors (#18)
15	11 April 2007	300	$7,638,215	Are We Done Yet? (#6), The Namesake (#13), The Singer (#17)
16	18 April 2007	Mr. Bean's Holiday	$3,443,843	Disturbia (#4), Stomp the Yard (#6), Sunshine (#8)
17	25 April 2007	Shooter	$2,306,217	Perfect Stranger (#4), The Reaping (#9), Paris, je t'aime (#15), Copying Beethoven (#19)
18	2 May 2007	Shooter	$1,311,570	The Number 23 (#4), Curse of the Golden Flower (#8), Half Nelson (#18), Ta Ra Rum Pum (#19)
19	9 May 2007	Spider-Man 3	$11,982,672	Because I Said So (#2), The History Boys (#6), Noise (#17), The Science of Sleep (#20)
20	16 May 2007	Spider-Man 3	$5,118,668	28 Weeks Later (#2), Georgia Rule (#4), Lucky You (#5)
21	23 May 2007	Spider-Man 3	$3,235,832	Zodiac (#2), Breach (#6), Reno 911!: Miami (#8)
22	30 May 2007	Pirates of the Caribbean: At World's End	$14,855,985	My Best Friend (#9), Shootout at Lokhandwala (#18)
23	6 June 2007	Pirates of the Caribbean: At World's End	$7,835,837	Romulus, My Father (#4), The Messengers (#20)
24	13 June 2007	Shrek the Third	$14,698,677	Hostel: Part II (#5), Driving Lessons (#11), Dinosaurs: Giants of Patagonia (#15)
25	20 June 2007	Shrek the Third	$6,286,026	Ocean's Thirteen (#2), Bridge to Terabithia (#4), Jhoom Barabar Jhoom (#10)
26	27 June 2007	Shrek the Third	$4,053,164	Fantastic Four: Rise of the Silver Surfer (#2), Blades of Glory (#4), I Do (#8), Nancy Drew (#9), The Dead Girl (#13)
27	4 July 2007	Transformers	$11,466,168	Clubland (#9), Apne (#18), Four Minutes (#19)
28	11 July 2007	Transformers	$7,085,042	Knocked Up (#2), Harry Potter and the Order of the Phoenix opening day (#3), Black Book (#14)
29	18 July 2007	Harry Potter and the Order of the Phoenix †	$16,326,508	La Vie en rose (#8)
30	25 July 2007	Harry Potter and the Order of the Phoenix †	$6,444,039	Premonition (#4), Evening (#5), Lucky Miles (#13), Partner (#18), Gone (#20)
31	1 August 2007	The Simpsons Movie	$15,816,056	Amazing Grace (#5), In the Land of Women (#9)
32	8 August 2007	The Simpsons Movie	$7,274,035	Licence to Wed (#3), Fracture (#4), Mr. Brooks (#8), Black Snake Moan (#12), Snow Cake (#13)
33	15 August 2007	Die Hard 4.0	$5,040,919	Sicko (#9), Chak De! India (#12)
34	22 August 2007	I Now Pronounce You Chuck and Larry	$3,076,680	Black Sheep (#11), This Is England (#13), After the Wedding (#19)
35	29 August 2007	No Reservations	$2,195,386	Next (#6), Heyy Babyy (#13), The Home Song Stories (#16), Boynton Beach Club (#20)
36	5 September 2007	The Bourne Ultimatum	$8,196,081	Once (#9)
37	12 September 2007	The Bourne Ultimatum	$5,015,313	Ratatouille (#2), The Final Winter (#10), Lady Chatterley (#16), The White Planet (#18)
38	19 September 2007	Hairspray	$4,532,318	Surf's Up (#4), Forbidden Lie$ (#12)
39	26 September 2007	Hairspray	$3,218,845	Superbad (#2), Evan Almighty (#3), Stardust (#6), Underdog (#8), Bratz: The Movie (#9), December Boys (#10), Joe Strummer: The Future Is Unwritten (#18)
40	3 October 2007	Rush Hour 3	$4,733,698	Sea Monsters: A Prehistoric Adventure (#13), The War on Democracy (#16)
41	10 October 2007	Rush Hour 3	$2,589,645	The Kingdom (#4), The Nanny Diaries (#9), The Seeker: The Dark Is Rising (#12), Away from Her (#15)
42	17 October 2007	Death at a Funeral	$1,720,034	Resident Evil: Extinction (#2), The Brave One (#5), Bhool Bhulaiyaa (#18), Laaga Chunari Mein Daag (#19)
43	24 October 2007	Death at a Funeral	$1,684,905	Michael Clayton (#2), Rogue Assassin (#4), A Mighty Heart (#9)
44	31 October 2007	Saw IV	$2,375,346	Good Luck Chuck (#3), Eastern Promises (#7), Waitress (#13), Control (#17)
45	7 November 2007	Death at a Funeral	$1,782,855	The Game Plan (#2), Death Proof (#6), The Assassination of Jesse James by the Coward Robert Ford (#10), Across the Universe (#11)
46	14 November 2007	Death at a Funeral	$1,376,440	Lions for Lambs (#2), 30 Days of Night (#4), Rogue (#5), Om Shanti Om (#9), Saawariya (#16), Conversations with My Gardener (#19)
47	21 November 2007	Elizabeth: The Golden Age	$1,908,178	Fred Claus (#2), Gabriel (#5)
48	28 November 2007	The Heartbreak Kid	$2,704,969	Halloween (#6), Rescue Dawn (#11), Balls of Fury (#19), Dhan Dhana Dhan Goal (#20)
49	5 December 2007	Beowulf	$3,063,544	Daddy Day Camp (#7), Into the Wild (#8), Aaja Nachle (#16)
50	12 December 2007	Bee Movie	$3,723,251	Hitman (#2), 1408 (#4), Twice Upon a Time (#19)
51	19 December 2007	Bee Movie	$3,352,688	Mr. Magorium's Wonder Emporium (#2), Hunting and Gathering (#12)
52	26 December 2007	National Treasure: Book of Secrets	$4,488,750	Boxing Day openings: The Golden Compass (#4), Aliens vs. Predator: Requiem (#5), Atonement (#6), Enchanted (#7), No Country for Old Men (#12), P.S. I Love You (#13), The Darjeeling Limited (#18)

== See also ==
- List of Australian films – Australian films by year
- 2007 in film
