= Pirate Islands =

Australian children's television program

- Title screen
- Genre: Science fiction Children's television Adventure
- Created by: Jonathan M. Shiff; Greg Millin
- Developed by: Joanne Watson
- Directed by: Richard Jasek; Grant Brown
- Starring: Brooke Harman; Eliza Taylor-Cotter; Nicholas Donaldson; Oliver Ackland; Collin Moody
- Composers: Danny Beckermann; Ric Formosa
- Country of origin: Australia
- Original language: English
- No. of seasons: 1
- No. of episodes: 26 (list of episodes)

Production
- Executive producers: Jonathan M. Shiff; Kay Ben M'Rad
- Producers: Daniel Scharf; Jonathan M. Shiff
- Cinematography: Laszlo Baranyai
- Editors: Philip Watts; Angie Higgins
- Running time: 24 minutes
- Production companies: Film Finance Corporation Australia; Jonathan M. Shiff Productions; Tele Images International; Network Ten Australia; Film Victoria

Original release
- Network: Network Ten
- Release: 3 March – 30 June 2003

Related
- The Lost Treasure of Fiji (2007)

Pirate Islands is an Australian children's television program screened on Network Ten in 2003. A sequel called The Lost Treasure of Fiji premiered on Network Ten in 2007.

In the United States, episodes 1–13 were broadcast on FoxBox, a programming block operated by 4Kids Entertainment. In the United Kingdom, the show aired on both CITV in 2003 and Nickelodeon UK in early 2008. In Vietnam, it is aired on VTC9 – Let's Viet and also, screened in Spain and Portugal by Disney Channel.

== Plot summaries ==
=== Part 1 ===
Kate Redding, a sister of Nicholas and Sarah, is playing a new computer game called Pirate Islands, which has been created by her father. After Sarah tampers with the computer scanner, lightning strikes the house, and the scanner goes wild, zapping the three siblings inside the computer game. After teleporting inside the game, Kate meets Mars, the main character of the video game. Blackheart, the pirate captain, takes the siblings aboard the pirate ship and threatens to walk them off the plank, Mars climbs aboard and cuts the rope, causes the sails to fall against the pirates, the siblings escape and attempt to find their scanner, only to be cornered by the pirates and drop it into Blackheart's grasp, who uses it unknowingly to zap his crew-mate, causing him to pixelate and melt.

Kate discovers that users are transported between islands in the game through icons, after jumping inside, she ends up on castaway island only to find that Carmen, the second in command, has stolen all the items from Kate's bedroom. The pirates arrive and chase the gang off the island, causing Sarah to trip against a tree trunk which triggers a secret entrance inside the tree, which contains stairways up towards a hidden treehouse, the gang store their few belongings and decide to call this place their new home.

A hidden cabinet inside the tree house stores wet boots, which are found by Kate, who discovers they are power-ups in the game which allows the characters to walk on water, after raiding the pirate ship and discovering a treasure map, Blackheart reappears and threatens them with the scanner, but Mars knocks it out of his hand and they escape from the ship. Kate, furious, returns the next day with the power-up boots and takes control of the ship, stealing the scanner and escaping, she discovers back at the treehouse the batteries are dead as Blackheart has used it multiple times, saddened by this outcome, Kate announces they will have to stay here, 'A little bit longer'.

A new icon is found which transports Kate to haunted island, where the ghost of Captain Quade hides, a previous member of Blackheart's crew who he murdered when Quade abandoned ship to search for the treasure. After almost being killed, Kate luckily grabs Quade's logbook and escapes the ship. After searching the logbook for clues, Kate realises her music box has batteries identical to the ones needed for the computer scanner, however after multiple events, it has ended up in Blackheart's grasp. Back at the treehouse, Nicholas finds a second power up, a jetpack. Kate confronts Blackheart to meet her at the beach to swap the music box for Quade's logbook, but she is kidnapped in her attempt, only to be saved by Nicholas's jetpack joyride. Kate escapes leaving Blackheart with the music box, once more.

Mars raids the pirate ship with a keg and implants Kate's mobile phone, which she uses as a walkie-talkie between the Blackheart's ship and Captain Quade's ship. After scaring the pirates away from the main cabin. Mars enters and steals the music box, placing it inside the keg and throwing it in the water. The next day the keg washes up and is found to be empty. Back at castaway island, Carmen promises she will give Kate the batteries if she gives her the jetpack, the power-up boots and the logbook. Blackheart suspiciously arrives at the island to destroy Kate once and for all just as Kate programs the scanner to leave the game. Dugal, Blackheart's second in command, races inside and unplugs the scanner from the console, and grabs it. Kate pushes him over and grabs back the scanner escaping, leaving Mars about to be killed and Sarah and Nicholas captured. Kate returns to the village with a newly programmed scanner, this time programmed for destruction. She switches it on and zaps the sky, which begins to be torn apart as the computer game slowly begins to break down. The village catches fire and is destroyed as Blackheart fights his way through the storm and rips the scanner out of Kate's grasp and collecting her bag containing the logbook. With the scanner now programmed for destruction, Kate begins to cry realising it's all her fault, and she doesn't know what Blackheart may do next.

=== Part 2 ===
Now in control of the scanner and the logbook. Blackheart finds a clue, holding it against a mirror he discovers a secret code which pin points to a location on the main island. Kate vows to please her siblings and boards the pirate ship, discovering the code. Kate and Blackheart race to the location and Kate discovers a treasure chest containing an iron key, Blackheart arrives and steals it from her as Kate cries announcing this time, they are truly beaten. The following day, Kate takes up judo in an attempt to begin sword-fighting. After using the jetpack to fool Blackheart, he catches her leg and destroys the jetpack, but Kate uses judo and flips the pirate over her shoulder, Blackheart drops his sword and Kate grabs it, escaping.

Mars teaches Kate to sword-fight, and is banished as the village leader for not helping the castaways look for the treasure. Meanwhile, Blackheart finds a cascade in the cliffs with an iron door, however there is no lock for the key. Carmen orders an infiltration on the forest in an attempt to find Kate's treehouse, but Mars stops them and wins the castaways over, being renewed as the leader, Carmen is growing furious. Kate and Mars make an agreement to help each other search for the treasure, vowing to split it 50/50 for the castaways and Kate to swap for the scanner. Mars sets a trap. Blackheart falls for it and Kate steals the key, racing to the iron door, she knocks, a keyhole burns into the door and she enters shutting before Blackheart gets inside. Mars is upset as Kate has broken her promise. Inside, Kate finds a wooden floating wheel, but as she leaves, Mars grabs it from her, and tells her they are no longer friends.

Carmen and Mars take the wheel to Captain Quade to get some clues on what it does. But Quade steals it, Carmen has to return to Kate for help but she is not happy about it. After Kate saves Mars, he tells her he didn't need the help. And they sword-fight to prove who is a better fighter. Before a winner is announced, Blackheart arrives and Kate leads him inside the ship, she takes the wheel and exists a different way. Blackheart is slowly falling apart and takes the scanner to the forest, turning it on, Pirate Islands begins to rip apart for a second time. Minutes before the game is destroyed, Kate throws the wheel to Blackheart and races to the scanner, switching it off. Blackheart beats her to it once again and retrieves the scanner and the wheel. Blackheart solves the next clue in the logbook, taking the wheel to the waterfall, he finds a hidden panel and switches the waterfall off, opening a hidden door. Kate enters with Mars, both angry at each other. But are forced to work together as Blackheart races to beat them. They find a walkway and an icy block in the wall. Smashing it they retrieve the next clue, a golden egg.

The golden egg is taken to the cliffs on castaway island as instructed by the logbook. There, Kate throws it off the cliff as it begins to fly, it explodes leaving behind a diamond. Mars and Kate, now friends once more, take the diamond to Quade's ship as he tells them how his heart was broken, he evaporates, leaving behind a floating portal, the diamond is inserted and a beam of light explodes from within leaving behind a holographic map, showing a secret island has risen from the waves, that's where they'll find the golden idol.

The race is on to return home as Kate travels to the island as Blackheart arrives quickly behind. They find a golden door and use Sarah's talking plant to get inside. However, just as they are about to enter the final part of the treasure hunt, Blackheart arrives and throws them off the cliff to the rocky ledge below, with no chance of escape as the pirates head off towards the idol. Kate charges her energy and discovers inside this video game there are no rules. She flies without the jetpack gracefully and escapes towards the final room. There, Kate and Blackheart sword-fight to the death as Blackheart smacks Kate backwards into the path of the golden idol, which Kate ducks from leading Blackheart to get zapped and turned to gold. The battle is over. Carmen takes control of the pirate ship and discovers the scanner. Thanking Kate, she gives it to her and they leave the island. Back at the treehouse, Kate and Mars kiss. She promises she'll be back. Mars tells her he'll be waiting. She programs the scanner back to the original state, and they leave the island, finding her room exactly how she left it, except that they have taken home Sarah's talking plant Bell. 'Pirate Islands is real', whispers Kate, as they all smile at each other.

== Cast list ==
=== Main ===
- Brooke Harman as Kate Redding
- Eliza Taylor-Cotter as Sarah Redding
- Nicholas Donaldson as Nicholas Redding
- Oliver Ackland as Mars
- Collin Moody as Captain Blackheart

=== Recurring ===
- Lucia Smyrk as Carmen
- Darcy Bonser as Perry
- Jim Daly as Dugal
- Andy McPhee as Cutthroat Jack
- Jasper Bagg as Darcy the Dandy
- Franklyn Ajaye as Five Spice
- Ziggy Crowe as Giant
- Russell Allan as Ugly Sam
- Graham Jahne as Ned Crow
- Derrick Murphy as Spanish Pete
- John Stanton as the ghost of Captain Quade
- Tony Nikolakopoulos as Cannonball Bob

== Merchandise ==
Two Telemovies (each 96 mins) have been released. They are cut down versions of all 26 episodes, leaving out a lot of footage. There have been no plans to release all 26 episodes in a DVD boxset.

== The Lost Treasure of Fiji ==
The Lost Treasure of Fiji
- Genre: Sci-Fi; Children's; Adventure
- Created by: Jonathan M. Shiff; Greg Millin
- Directed by: Grant Brown
- Starring: John Noble; Kain O'Keeffe; Adelaide Clemens; Sera Tikotikovatu; Joey Atkins; Wame Valentine; Nathan Vernon; Jim Daly; Tony Nikolakopoulos; Bert La Bonté; Bay Abbey; Francisco Dos Santos; Saskia Burmeister; Robert Grubb
- Composer: Art Phillips
- Country of origin: Australia
- Original language: English
- No. of seasons: 1
- No. of episodes: 13

Production
- Executive producer: Jonathan M. Shiff
- Production location: Fiji
- Cinematography: Darrell Martin
- Editor: Wayne Hyett
- Production company: Banana J Media

Original release
- Network: Network Ten
- Release: 12 February – 28 February 2007

Related
- Pirate Islands

=== Plot summary ===
Three Australian computer game champs, Tyler, Marty, and Alison and one Fijian computer champ, Kirra are forced to swap their game consoles for real swords when they are thrown into a virtual pirate island world in Fiji. They face the dreaded Captain Blackheart and his dangerous, seductive new First Mate, Lily and a band of fierce pirates for a hoard of treasure stolen from an Egyptian Pharaoh's tomb by the legendary pirate ship, Neptune's Revenge, and its captain, Salty Ben. Tyler, Kirra, and Alison befriend a local Fijian tribe and its leader, Sol, who takes a liking to Kirra, while Marty prefers the pirate lifestyle, becoming Captain Blackheart's cabin boy at one stage. Marty's allegiance is constantly questioned whether he's on Blackheart's side or his brother Tyler's side, after Lily, leads a revolt and takes over Blackheart's ship. This is a problem for Marty, as Lily is crueller, more suspicious and far cleverer than Blackheart, who is more there for comedy than fast-paced action scenes.

Will Tyler, Kirra, and Alison find the three torn pieces of the treasure map and find their way home, or will the dreaded Captain Blackheart, Marty, Lily and the pirate crew find the Eye of Osiris, treasure of treasures, and live forever?

=== Cast ===
- John Noble as Captain Blackheart
- Saskia Burmeister as First Mate Lily
- Kain O'Keeffe as Tyler
- Adelaide Clemens as Alison
- Sera Tikotikovatu as Kirra
- Jim Daly as Dugal
- Wame Valentine as Sol
- Nathan Vernon as Henry
- Robert Grubb as Salty Ben
- Tony Nikolakopoulos as Cannonball Bob
- Bert La Bonté as Sharktooth Pete
- Francisco Dos Santos as Nick the Knot
- Bay Abbey as Scurvy Bill
- Joey Atkins as Marty

=== Episodes ===
No.	Title	Directed by	Written by	Original release date
1	"Game On"	Grant Brown	Joss King	12 February 2007
2	"Sanctuary"	Grant Brown	David Hannam	13 February 2007
3	"Nemesis"	Grant Brown	Max Dann	14 February 2007
4	"Without Paddles"	Grant Brown	Philip Dalkin	15 February 2007
5	"Secrets and Lies"	Grant Brown	Sam Carroll	16 February 2007
6	"Poison"	Grant Brown	Anthony Morris	19 February 2007
7	"Mutiny"	Grant Brown	Simon Butters	20 February 2007
8	"Cross and Doublecross"	Grant Brown	Chris Anastassiades	21 February 2007
9	"Choices"	Grant Brown	David Hannam	22 February 2007
10	"Broadside"	Grant Brown	Max Dann	23 February 2007
11	"Drum Roll"	Grant Brown	Anthony Morris	26 February 2007
12	"Unholy Alliance"	Grant Brown	Kirsty Fisher	27 February 2007
13	"Tabu"	Grant Brown	Chris Roache	28 February 2007

=== Merchandise ===
All 13 episodes have been released on DVD in the Netherlands. The audio is English with hardcoded Dutch subtitles. there are 26 Episodes

== Television airings ==
Country	Channel	Title	English Meaning
Australia	Network Ten	Pirate Islands	
Australia	Disney Channel (Australia)	Pirate Islands	
United States	Fox Box	Pirate Islands	
United Kingdom	Nickelodeon UK/Ireland	Pirate Islands	
United Kingdom	CITV	Pirate Islands	
Germany	KiKa	Die Pirateninsel	The Pirate Island
Germany	KiKa	Der Schatz von Fidschi	The Treasure of Fiji
France	Fox Kids (France)	Mission pirates	Pirates Mission
France	Jetix (France)	Mission pirates	Pirates Mission
Spain	Disney Channel Spain	Pirate Island: Entra en el Juego	Pirate Island: Enter the Game
Portugal	Disney Channel Portugal	Pirate Island: Entra no Jogo	Pirate Island: Enter the Game
Israel	IBA-Channel 33, Channel 22	איי הפיראטים	Pirate Islands
Italy	RaiSat Smash; Italia 1 (the films)	Le isole dei pirati	Pirate Islands
Poland	TVP1	Wyspy Piratów	Pirate Islands
Belgium	Ketnet	Pirateneiland	Pirate Island
Sweden	Barnkanalen	Piratöarna	Pirate Islands
Russia	СТС, Бибигон, Детский	Пиратские острова	Pirate Islands
Ukraine	1+1	Піратські острови	Pirate Islands
Saudi Arabia	MBC4	جزر القراصنة	Pirate Islands
