= List of Pirate Islands episodes =

Pirate Islands is an Australian children's television series conceived for Network Ten by Jonathan M. Shiff and Greg Millin. The series is produced by the Film Finance Corporation Australia, Jonathan M. Shiff Productions, Tele Images International, Network Ten Australia and Film Victoria.

== Episodes ==
No.	Title	Directed by	Written by	Original release date
1	"The Game"	Richard Jasek	Annie Fox	3 March 2003
Three siblings (Kate, Nicholas and Sarah Redding) are playing their father's newest game creation: Pirate Islands. Shortly before a lightning strike, Sarah finds some sort of scanner her father created, allowing things to be scanned into the game. A lightning strike to the house inadvertently activates the scanner and puts them into the game. The siblings must now find a place to hide while avoiding the pirates and the village castaways if they're to have any chance of winning the game and finding a way home.
2	"Sanctuary"	Richard Jasek	Annie Fox	15 March 2003
While trying to avoid the pirates, Nicholas finds a portal that will lead them to Castaway Island. The pirates suspect they might have gone there and decide to follow. With pirates on both Main Island and Castaway Island, the trio decides Main Island might be the safer hiding place, and their efforts are soon rewarded as they find a Treehouse Sanctuary built into the game that neither the pirates nor the castaways are aware of.
3	"Close Call"	Richard Jasek	Peter Kinloch	22 March 2003
While searching through the treehouse, the siblings discover a pair of magical boots and some cellphones that could give them an advantage over the pirates. While Nicholas and Sarah distract the pirates, Kate runs out to the ship to try and find the scanner. However, when Mars follows her, he could either cause everything to be ruined or allow them to find an item that'll give them a heads-up in the treasure hunt.
4	"Blackmail"	Richard Jasek	Peter Kinloch	29 March 2003
Captain Blackheart blackmails the castaways to try and get his treasure chart back, so Carmen decides to take matters into her own hands by kidnapping Nicholas and trading him to the pirates. Meanwhile, Kate hopes to swap the treasure chart for the scanner, but when she learns Sarah had the chart stolen from her by Darcy the Dandy and Cutthroat Jack, who are planning to abandon the pirate crew, Kate recruits Mars to help with a plan she hopes will save her brother's life.
5	"The Great Escape"	Richard Jasek	Kris Mrksa	5 April 2003
Nicholas is forced to give the pirates false information on where to locate the treasure to avoid being scanned out of existence. Elsewhere, Kate tries to come up with a plan to rescue Nicholas, unaware he's being guarded by the most deadly member of the pirate crew: the cook. Mars and the castaways decide to follow Blackheart and his crew to the treasure's location, unaware of the ruse Nicholas has given them.
6	"Haunted Islands"	Richard Jasek	Stephen Davis & Kier Shorey	12 April 2003
Kate hopes to use the batteries from her CD player to recharge the scanner to be able to get home but one of the young castaways, Perry, has it and wants to have some form of enjoyment in his life. Kate and Sarah come across him, and he leads them to a second portal that goes to the third island: Haunted Island. Once there, Kate learns no one can find the golden treasure unless they have the treasure chart and dead man Captain Quade's logbook. Though, in order to get the logbook, she must accomplish a task no one has succeeded at: defeating Captain Quade's ghost.
7	"Talking Plants"	Richard Jasek	Kris Mrksa	19 April 2003
Sarah uses Captain Quade's logbook to navigate to a third portal, leading her to the fourth island: Plant Island. However, Plant Island is dangerous because all the plants on it are living and cause everyone without the correct navigational tools to get lost easily. Meanwhile, Kate offers the castaways the logbook if they'll help lead her to rescue Sarah, but in the process, Mars is cut by a poison dagger that will expose the secret of the treehouse to at least one castaway.
8	"Perry the Kid"	Grant Brown	Stephen Davis & Kier Shorey	26 April 2003
Perry begins to starve due to a lack of food, so Nicholas decides to offer him some fish for the CD player. However, Perry doesn't trust him and runs away. Eventually, feeling betrayed by Carmen and not trusting Nicholas, Perry decides the only way he can take care of himself will be to join the pirates. There's a condition though: in order to join them, Perry must bring them Mars' spyglass. Will Perry truly betray the other castaways, or can Nicholas find a way to earn his trust first and possibly gain the batteries that could lead them home?
9	"The Second Power-Up"	Grant Brown	Joanne Watson	3 May 2003
It's an episode full of trickery and deceit. First off, Kate tries to trade the logbook for her CD player, but after agreeing to the trade she secretly removes all the pages telling of the treasure. Mars agrees to let Kate try her plan, but then he secretly tries to ambush the pirates. Speaking of the pirates, Captain Blackheart agrees to keep his men on ship, but creates a set of dummies to make it appear they're on ship, before sneaking them ashore. And finally, Nicholas finds a second power-up: the jetpack, whose ability to allow him to fly may allow him to keep his sister safe from all the deceit.
10	"Nightmare"	Grant Brown	David Phillips	10 May 2003
The ghost of Captain Quade begins haunting Blackheart's dreams, forcing the pirates to seek out Carmen's tea for assistance. When that fails, Blackheart has Carmen captured. Kate comes up with a plan that should allow Carmen to go free, but his mistrust of others ultimately leads to a fight between Mars and Blackheart that'll force Carmen to rely on the person she trusts most: herself.
11	"Plantspeak"	Grant Brown	Annie Fox	17 May 2003
Sarah's plant Bell begins continually singing her song, but neither the castaways nor the siblings know why. It ends up that the plants on every island can speak with each other, and they've just warned Sarah of Blackheart's latest plan to deceive the castaways and trick Mars into giving away the treehouse. One big question remains though: how can Bell make any of them understand when all her words come out only as music?
12	"Ghost Attack"	Grant Brown	Annie Fox	31 May 2003
Kate's latest plan to get her CD player can't even begin because Blackheart has doubled the watch. In order to trick Blackheart, Mars agrees to get himself captured with a barrel of sultanas. Hidden within will be the second cellphone, which Kate will use to send the voice of Captain Quade through. However, this means everyone will be at risk as Mars must go face-to-face with Blackheart while Kate goes face-to-face with Quade. Will either side be successful without giving the other away?
13	"The Showdown"	Grant Brown	Michael Joshua	7 June 2003
Carmen recovers the CD player, but in order for Kate to get it back, Carmen says Kate must make it worthwhile. In exchange for the CD player, Kate offers up the water boots, the jetpack, Quade's logbook, and the location of the treehouse. Carmen agrees, but the trade makes Mars despair, so he leaves. Meanwhile, Blackheart learns that everyone is on Castaway Island and decides to ambush them. Carmen and the castaways escape with the boots and jetpack, but the pirates capture Mars, Nicholas, and Sarah (along with the backpack containing Quade's log). With no other choice, Kate confronts Blackheart with the scanner, but with no time to program it correctly, she might accidentally destroy the entire island or end up giving the Captain back his most dangerous weapon: the scanner.
14	"The Riddle"	Grant Brown	Michael Joshua	12 June 2003
Kate enters into an alliance with Cutthroat Jack to get the riddle to find the treasure by revealing the dead eye inside the riddle isn't a grave, but a rock. She also tries to recruit the help of the castaways, but Carmen refuses to let them, afraid Kate will steal the gold. Seeing no other choice, Kate tricks Cutthroat into giving her the clue, and after she and Nicholas realize the meaning, they race to dig up the treasure chest. Cutthroat returns to the ship and reveals he knows the dead eye is a rock. Blackheart quickly realizes the meaning and has all of them race ashore. It's just a matter of time to see who will unbury the chest first, but will the chest truly contain the gold, or will it only lead to more mysteries to decipher before the treasure is found?
15	"Kate Finds a Sword"	Grant Brown	David Phillips	13 June 2003
Nicholas tries to teach Kate judo as a form of self-defense, but she is unable to get the hang of it against her own brother. Kate decides instead she must fight Blackheart with the sword, so she asks Mars to teach her. He agrees, only if she finds a worthy sword to use. First, Kate goes to claim Quade's sword, and in the process finds out his weakness. However, Mars deems the sword as being unworthy, so she turns her eyes toward Blackheart's sword instead. Kate comes up with the plan of using the jetpack to ambush him and take his sword, but Blackheart has other tricks and instead, has one of his men disguise himself as him while sneaking behind Kate. He destroys the jetpack and is ready to force Kate into submission unless she can quickly master the judo moves Nicholas tried to teach her.
16	"Training"	Grant Brown	David Phillips	16 June 2003
Mars begins training Kate on how to fight with the sword. However, Kate has terrible problems with balance, so he takes her to a hidden location no one else is aware of. At the same time, Blackheart learns Main Island has a hidden door, which will lead to the treasure. When Perry's life is put in danger with Mars not being present, Carmen must come up with a plan to save him. While she proves to be successful, Carmen demands a council be held to determine if Mars is still worthy of being the castaways' leader.
17	"Mars Restored"	Grant Brown	Peter Kinloch	17 June 2003
In her first act as the new leader, Carmen decides the castaways should stop chasing the treasure and instead find out where the treehouse is, so they can use it as a negotiating tool against Blackheart. Meanwhile, Kate tries to figure out how to get Mars reinstated, and Mars tries to figure out what he can steal from the pirates to regain the castaways' trust.
18	"The White Room"	Grant Brown	Peter Kinloch	18 June 2003
Kate agrees to help the castaways get the key from Blackheart so they can enter the secret room. While negotiating, she promises not to enter the room without Mars. Though, when the pirates get to the door before Mars and Carmen, Kate and Nicholas are forced to go through. There they find a room that hasn't been fully programmed yet and appears to be completely white. The room holds the next clue to the treasure, but first, she and Nicholas must figure out how to successfully navigate a room where nothing can be seen. And even if the two do manage to escape, Carmen has been planting words of deceit into Mars' heart that may turn him from being a great ally to one of their worst enemies.
19	"Kate vs. Mars"	Grant Brown	David Rapsey	19 June 2003
Carmen and Mars are unable to figure out what the wheel represents, so they decide to seek guidance from the man who hid the treasure — Captain Quade. When Quade bests Mars in a sword fight, Carmen decides to seek Kate's help, since Kate is the only person to have ever defeated Quade. Meanwhile, Blackheart learns the wheel is now on Haunted Island and joins the festivities, but which fight will prove more interesting: Quade vs. Blackheart or Mars vs. Kate?
20	"Sarah Kidnapped"	Grant Brown	David Rapsey	20 June 2003
When Sarah goes to get freshwater for Bell, she finds herself ambushed and taken prisoner by the pirates. Blackheart is hoping to use Sarah to expose the location of the treehouse, so he can take the wheel into his possession. Sarah is very cautious of his words and trickery, but she does let it slip that they need the console and scanner to get home. Eventually, Blackheart comes up with a foolproof plan, but when his own parrot accidentally reveals to Sarah she's being followed, Blackheart may find himself losing what he considers to be his most valuable possession: his bird.
21	"The Storm"	Richard Jasek	Meg Mappin	23 June 2003
Darcy the Dandy and Cutthroat Jack find some Spanish doubloons on the island, but because they aren't the Golden Idol, Blackheart destroys them. Thinking Blackheart has lost his mind, the two start a mutiny, but Blackheart is well prepared. He grabs the scanner and threatens to destroy them all with it. Upon seeing how successful that threat is, he takes the scanner and activates it on Main Island, threatening to destroy everything, unless Kate brings him the wheel. However, Mars thinks there's another way and tries to steal the wheel, bringing both of them to a possible data storm deletion.
22	"Behind the Waterfall"	Richard Jasek	Joanne Watson	24 June 2003
Blackheart deciphers that "East meets West" refers to the chart and realizes when the two ends touch, it leads to the waterfall, where the next clue can be found. After trying to sabotage one another, both Mars and Kate end up trapped in the new opening behind the waterfall. The two must now put aside their rivalry and work together, if they're to find the next clue and escape from the pirates with their lives intact.
23	"Carmen's Betrayal"	Richard Jasek	Michael Joshua	25 June 2003
Kate and Mars try to figure out how to get the golden egg open while Blackheart shows up at the village and threatens Carmen that if she doesn't give him information about what it is Kate and Mars found (the egg) and where it is, he'll burn down the village. Carmen decides to help Blackheart, but only if she and the castaways are promised a safe passage home. They figure out (thanks to Quade's log) that the egg needs to be taken to the cliffs on Castaway Island, so Carmen tricks Kate and Mars to the cliffs, where Blackheart awaits. But how long before Kate and Mars realize they're being set up? And will they be able to figure the egg out in order to get to the next clue?
24	"Defeating Quade"	Richard Jasek	Michael Joshua	26 June 2003
Kate, Mars, Nicholas and Sarah try to figure out what to do with the diamond and find out that, in the sunlight, it makes a rainbow. They decide the only way to figure the diamond out is to raid the pirate ship to get access to Quade's log, so they set up a plan to trick the pirates. Quade's log is telling the diamond should be taken to "the dark ship" and both Kate and Blackheart realize: it means Quade's ship on Haunted Island. Kate and Mars arrive at the ship before Blackheart but are, of course, met with unwelcoming Quade. But will they, in fact, be able to beat him or will they find his soft spot, and along with that, the diamond's purpose? And will Blackheart make it out of Quade's ship before he is trapped?
25	"Secret Island"	Richard Jasek	David Phillips	27 June 2003
Kate, Mars, Nicholas and Sarah (along with Sarah's plant Bell) all go to Secret Island, the fifth island on Pirate Islands, to find the Golden Idol. However, Carmen suspects Mars was not truthful about where he was going, so she decides to follow (along with Perry). When they discover Secret Island, Carmen goes to Blackheart and makes a deal: if she tells him what she knows, she and the castaways have a safe passage home. Blackheart agrees but later betrays Carmen and goes to Secret Island only with the other pirates. Carmen realizes she's betrayed Mars and all the other castaways because of her jealousy, for now Blackheart has the upper hand in the treasure hunt and can easily stop Kate and the others from finding their way home.
26	"Going Home"	Richard Jasek	David Phillips	30 June 2003
Captain Blackheart and his pirates discover the Golden Idol, that allows things to be turned into gold. As soon as the first item is turned into gold, Blackheart becomes greedy and wants more and more and more gold. With the support from Sarah, Kate figures a way to get out of their entrapment. The group split into two, with Kate, Mars and Sarah going for the Golden Idol. Their plan goes smoothly until Cutthroat captures Sarah and threatens Kate and Mars, who are forced to surrender. However, they soon get out of that entrapment as well and Kate and Blackheart go one on one with each other. Will Kate and her siblings finally defeat Blackheart and be able to go home?
