= The Life (novel) =

2011 novel by Malcolm Knox

- First edition
- Author: Malcolm Knox
- Language: English
- Publisher: Allen & Unwin, Australia
- Publication date: 2011
- Publication place: Australia
- Media type: Print (Paperback)
- Pages: 416
- ISBN: 978-1-74237-299-0
- OCLC: 716054977
- Preceded by: Jamaica

The Life is a 2011 novel by the Australian author Malcolm Knox. The novel tells the story of the rise and fall of a fictional world surfing champion Dennis Keith. The character of Dennis Keith was inspired by the life of the Australian surfer Michael Peterson.

The Life was published in 2011 and is the thirteenth book by Knox and his fourth novel. The book is to published in France under the title Shangrila by the Editions Asphalte, in May 2012.

== Plot summary ==
The Life traces the life story of Dennis Keith, now obese, mentally unwell and living in a retirement village with his mother.

A young would-be biographer arrives one day and begins to tease out his past. The story is told in different strands, one being reflections by Dennis (often in a variety of styles – first person, then third person) and also present-day conversations with the biographer.

Dennis is a poor gold coast kid who is mysteriously found and adopted by his mother "Mo" Keith. Dennis and his stepbrother Rod become obsessed with surfing at an earlier age. They prove to be talented and daring surfers and soon develop a reputation. They start entering competitions and eventually enter the nascent pro circuit, all the while descending into heavy drug use.

Dennis stumbles into an intermittent relationship with the singer Lisa Exmire. Lisa is found murdered and eventually charges are laid. Dennis's drug use escalates and he drops out of the pro circuit.

The novel concludes by revealing the truth about Dennis's family, the murder and the biographer.

== Themes ==
- the commercialisation of surfing as it becomes a professional sport
- the development of the gold coast and change in small towns
- drug use
- mental illness
- the nature of celebrity

== Characters ==
- Dennis Keith
- "Mo" Keith – Dennis's mother
- Rodney Keith – Dennis's brother
- Megan – (the "Bi-Fricken-Ographer")
- Lisa Exmire – singer, Dennis's girlfriend.
- FJ – friend, surfer
- Tink – friend, surfer

== Biographical elements ==
Several reviewers have noted the similarities of Dennis Keith to Michael Peterson. These similarities include:

- grew up in Coolangatta /Gold Coast/ Kirra Point
- poor upbringing, mother who once peeled prawns for a living
- renowned for the "cutback" manoeuvre.
- aviator sunglasses
- successful the 1970s
- took a famously chaotic trip to the US in the early 1970s with the Australian surf team,
- appeared in a famous surfing movie, surfing at Kirra
- long periods of heavy drug use and mental illness

It has also been suggested that some of the other characters in the book closely resemble other professional surfers including "FJ" being very similar to "PT" (Peter Townend) and "Tink" bearing a resemblance to Wayne "Rabbit" Bartholomew.

== Critical reception ==
The Guardian wrote "If Winton is an aria, Knox is early Rolling Stones", "The Life confirms what The Literary Review has known all along – 'Knox is, quite simply, a fabulous writer.'"

Christos Tsiolkas, author of the best selling novel The Slap wrote "The Life, is alternately evocative and lacerating, tender and unflinching, a gloriously honest, brutal and moving story of a man who was at the top of his game and then pissed it all away".

== See also ==
- Surf culture
