= Forbidden Love (novel) =

2003 novel by Norma Khouri

- Author: Norma Khouri
- Language: English
- Publication date: 2003

Forbidden Love (called Honor Lost: Love and Death in Modern Day Jordan in the United States) is a 2003 book written by Norma Khouri, purporting to tell a true story about her best friend in Jordan, Dalia. The story describes Dalia's love for a Christian soldier, Michael, which is kept secret from her Muslim father due to conflicts in religion. Her father eventually finds out, and stabs Dalia to death in a so-called honor killing. A year after publication, it was discovered that the story was entirely fabricated by Khouri.

== Plot summary ==
The novel centers on the life of Dalia, a young Muslim woman living in Amman, Jordan. When she falls in love with Michael, a young Catholic major in the British Army, she is forced to keep the relationship a secret and rely on her friend Norma to act as an intermediary. Although the lovers are only able to be alone together on a handful of occasions and Dalia's virginity remains intact, her father is so enraged when he hears of the affair from her older brother that he kills her two months after her twenty-sixth birthday. Khouri claimed that as a result, she had been forced to seek asylum in Queensland, Australia.

== Hoax scandal ==
Questions about Khouri's story surfaced almost immediately. Several readers wrote on message boards that much of the book didn't ring true, and others located 73 factual errors, anachronisms, and exaggerations (e.g. claiming that Jordan borders Kuwait, "fanciful" depictions of Amman, incorrect statements about Jordanian law, and banknotes that were not printed at the time the book supposedly took place). Khouri also aroused suspicions because she spoke perfect American English, despite her claims to have never lived in the United States.

Further, Khouri had promised to donate most of the proceeds to the Jordanian National Association for Women, but had only sent $100, while the group was suspicious of her claims from the start, contending that it would have known about such a crime given Jordan's size.

After conducting an investigation, they wrote to Random House Australia in September 2003, but Random House stood by Khouri.

In July 2004, a year after the book's release, Sydney Morning Herald literary editor Malcolm Knox wrote a series of articles that exposed Khouri as a complete fraud. Based on an 18-month investigation, he concluded Khouri had fabricated the story and sold it untruthfully as a memoir.

Khouri had not lived in Jordan since 1973, and had in fact lived in Chicago for most of her life, where she was married with two children. Her family had not heard from her since 2000, when she abruptly left Chicago to write the book.

Khouri continued to insist she'd told the truth, even when confronted with public records which proved beyond all doubt she had spent most of her life in the United States. Knox also unearthed evidence that suggested Khouri had left Chicago when legal problems arose with several real-estate transactions.

As a result, Random House pulled the book from the shelves in Australia and the UK indefinitely. Knox and fellow Australian journalist Caroline Overington won the 2004 Walkley Award for investigative journalism for the exposé.

== Forbidden Lie$ ==
In September 2007, a documentary entitled Forbidden Lie$ was released. Director Anna Broinowski tells the story of how Khouri's book became a best-seller, and then follows Khouri to Jordan. Since Khouri still insists that the story is true, Broinowski gives her the opportunity to prove that it is fully or at least partly truthful; however, the evidence Broinowski uncovers indicates not only that Khouri's book is fabricated (in spite of her father's claim that it was true) but that Khouri had committed a number of scams even before the book.

== See also ==
- Fake memoir
- Misery literature
