= A Private Man =

2004 novel by Malcolm Knox

- First edition
- Author: Malcolm Knox
- Language: English
- Genre: Crime novel
- Publisher: Vintage Books, Australia
- Publication date: 2004
- Publication place: Australia
- Media type: Print (Paperback)
- Pages: 385
- ISBN: 174051243X
- Preceded by: Summerland
- Followed by: Jamaica

A Private Man (2004) is a crime novel by Australian author Malcolm Knox. It won the 2005 Ned Kelly Award for Best First Novel.

== Plot summary ==
Dr John Brand has been dead for two days and his eldest son, Davis, suspects a cover-up. Another son, Chris, is batting to save his career in the Sydney Test, and a neglected third, Hammett, lurks in the background. During the five days of the cricket match, the family struggles with the death and its recriminations.

== Reviews ==
Simon Caterson in The Age notes that the novel "makes the audacious thematic move of presenting porn as a male obsession as widespread as porn's much more socially acceptable entertainment counterpart, sport".

== Awards and nominations ==
- 2005 winner Ned Kelly Award — Best First Novel
- 2005 commended Commonwealth Writers Prize — South East Asia and South Pacific Region — Best Book
- 2005 shortlisted Tasmania Pacific Region Prize — Tasmania Pacific Fiction Prize
- 2005 longlisted Miles Franklin Literary Award
- 2005 shortlisted New South Wales Premier's Literary Awards — Christina Stead Prize for Fiction
- 2006 longlisted International Dublin Literary Award
