= Lee Mason (actor) =

Lee Mason is an Australian film, television and stage actor from Melbourne. He is probably best known for his lead role in The Independent as naive independent politician Marty Browning. This role garnered Mason many favourable reviews, with James Brown of FilmInk describing Marty as "the most charming protagonist since Kenny". Recently awarded Best Actor in two major Film Festivals in 2016, Lee Mason has proved a unique character actor capable of lead roles and also memorable cameos. He has worked steadily in the Australian film industry for the last 10 years. He has worked as a director, writer and producer. He is perhaps best known for his portrayal of Marty Browning in The Independent and more recently Raskolnikov in Crime and Punishment. Mason's most recent work is a production of Glengarry Glen Ross at the Chapel Off Chapel theatre in Prahran.

== Filmography ==
 The Unlit (filming) 

Terrence Walker

 How Do You Know Chris? (post-production) 

Ray

 The Debt Collector (post-production) 

Black Douglas

 Choir Girl (completed) 

Julius

 Stung (Short) (completed) 

Max

2012 PMS Superpowers! (Short) (completed) 

Mr. Purple

2018 A Beautiful Request (Short) 

Nick

2018 The Age of Imitation 

Mr. Parker

2017 Dirty Bird (Short) 

Ray

2016 The Sound of Love (Short) 

Hubert

2016 The Death and Life of Otto Bloom 

Male Newsreader

2015/I Crime and Punishment 

Raskolnikov

2015/III Hit (Short) 

Doctor Granek

2014 Nothing to Write Home About (Short) 

Supermarket Customer

2014 The Suburbs Go on Forever (Short) 

Mr. Parker

2014 Dead Weights and Balloons (Short) 

Robert

2013 Donkey in a Lion's Cage (Short) 

Rabble man

2013 Captain Cone (Short) 

Captain Cone

2013 Underbelly (TV Series) 

Eugene Gorman - Squizzy Cooks a Goose (2013) ... Eugene Gorman - Squizzy Tempts Fate (2013) ... Eugene Gorman - Squizzy Puts One Over (2013) ... Eugene Gorman*Parallels (2005)

- Great Times in Rehab (short 2007)
- The Trial of Film (short 2007)
- The Independent (2007)
- Making Plans for Roland (short 2008)
- Pontos (short 2008)
- GFC: Gunpoint Finance Creditor (short 2009)
- Thank God You're Here (TV series 2009)
- Satisfaction (TV series 2009)
- City Homicide (TV series 2011)
- Black Pine Road (short 2010)
