= The Independent (2007 film) =

- Directed by: Andrew O'Keefe; John Studley
- Written by: Andrew O'Keefe; John Studley
- Produced by: Jim Xyga
- Starring: Lee Mason; Tony Nikolakopoulos; Sylvie De Crespigny; Chris Bunworth; Georgia Bolton; Grant Piro; Jonathon Auf Der Heide; Jim Daly
- Cinematography: Wayne Aistrope
- Music by: Nick Batterham
- Release date: 8 November 2007
- Country: Australia
- Language: English

The Independent is an Australian independent mockumentary film released in 2007, produced by Apocalypse Films. It chronicles the story of Marty Browning (Lee Mason), a man who runs for state parliament in a Victorian by-election to save his family farm, backed by a shady businessman (Tony Nikolakopoulos). He runs as an independent, but under the banner of "The Independent Party"; his plan is to form policies by asking members of the public for their opinions, thereby providing a direct public voice in parliament. (A similar purpose was held by the real-life Australian party Senator On-Line.)

The film was shot in 2006, and released to a small number of cinemas on 8 November 2007 in the lead up to the 2007 Australian federal election. A national cinema launch was planned for April/May 2008.

== Cast ==
- Lee Mason as Marty Browning
- Tony Nikolakopoulos as Tony Bentakis
- Sylvie De Crespigny
- Chris Bunworth
- Georgia Bolton
- Grant Piro
- Jonathon Auf Der Heide
- Jim Daly

== Critical response ==
Critical reception to the film was positive, with good reviews from many high-profile Australian film critics and an average rating of around three stars. A frequent criticism was that the film seems uncertain of its tone, wavering between comedy and drama, but overall the film was considered successfully endearing, with some reviewers praising the filmmakers' decision not to merely go for laughs. Margaret Pomeranz found the ending "problematic", but along with most other reviewers singled out Mason for his "outstanding" performance; James Brown of FILMINK Magazine described Marty as "the most charming protagonist since Kenny".

== See also ==
- Cinema of Australia
