= Malcolm Knox (author) =

Australian writer

- Occupations: Journalist, author, novelist
- Known for: A Private Man; Jamaica (2007); The First Friend (2024)
- Writing career
- Genres: Literature, non-fiction, essay

Malcolm Knox is an Australian journalist and author of fiction and non-fiction. He is known for his investigative and sports journalism; his novels A Private Man (2005), Jamaica (2007), and The First Friend (2024); and various essays and book reviews. He won his third Walkley Award in 2019. His latest novel is The Second Child, published in September 2026.

== Early life and education ==
Malcolm Knox grew up in Sydney and studied in Sydney and Scotland.

== Career ==
=== Journalism ===
Knox has held a number of positions at Sydney Morning Herald, including chief cricket correspondent (1996–99), assistant sport editor (1999–2000), and literary editor (2002–06). As literary editor, he broke the story of the fake Jordanian memoirist, Norma Khouri, which won him a Walkley Award (Investigative Journalism category) in 2004 (together with Caroline Overington).

In 2006, Knox was appointed as an editorial consultant at Pan Macmillan.

Since 2011, Knox became a sports columnist. In 2019, Knox and Nigel Gladstone wrote a piece in The Sun-Herald showing that Cricket Australia's participation figures were inflated.

=== Book reviews ===
His 2008 article in The Monthly, "In the giant green cathedral", explored the world of surf writing, both fiction and non-fiction, in particular Tim Winton's 2008 novel Breath.

=== Fiction ===
==== Novels ====
Knox has published several novels. His debut novel, Summerland (2000),> is a mystery novel, set among the wealthy elite of Sydney's northern beaches It explores themes of Australian identity and masculinity.

He followed this with further novels in 2004, A Private Man, then Jamaica (2007), The Life (2011), and The Wonder Lover (2015). His next novel, Bluebird (2020), is focused on various characters' midlife crises, based in coastal New South Wales communities.

His 2024 novel, The First Friend (Allen & Unwin), is a satirical novel employing black comedy scenarios, which brought comparison with Armando Iannucci. It is set in Georgia during the Soviet period in 1938, centred on the relationship between the newly-appointed head of the NKVD secret police, Lavrentiy Beria, and his fictional former childhood friend, now his chauffeur, Vasil Murtov.

In his second Soviet-era novel, The Second Child, published by Allen & Unwin in Australia on 1 September 2026, Murtov's daughter, Melor, becomes Beria's adoptive daughter and confidant. Set in the closing phase of World War II, the story has close parallels with Donald Trump's second term as President of the United States, and Knox compares Trump with Stalin: "Stalin was exactly the same as Trump, wanting to put his name on everything, creating this cult of personality, this striving for permanence".

==== Scriptwriting ====
In 2017, Knox was commissioned to co-write the Stan Original series Romper Stomper. He also wrote for the 2019 series Les Norton, which aired on ABC Television in 2019.

== Other roles ==
Knox served as a board director of the Copyright Agency (2008–2016) and of the Chappell Foundation (2017–2021), acting as honorary secretary at the latterfrom 2019 to 2021. He has also been a board director for the Australian Society of Authors.

== Awards and nominations ==
- 2001: Named as one of The Sydney Morning Herald Best Young Australian Novelists
- 2004: Co-winner, Walkley Award (Investigative Journalism category), with Caroline Overington, for the exposé of fraudulent author Norma Khouri (author of Forbidden Love)
- 2004: Runner-up, Graham Perkin Australian Journalist of the Year Award
- 2005?: Shortlisted, Commonwealth Book Prize and the Tasmanian Premier's Award, for A Private Man
- 2005: Winner, Ned Kelly Award for Best First Fiction for A Private Man
- 2006: Winner, Alex Buzo prize for research, for "Secrets of the Jury Room"
- 2007: Winner, Walkley Award for Magazine Feature Writing for essay "Cruising: Life and Death on the High Seas", published in the September 2006 issue of The Monthly
- 2008: Winner, Colin Roderick Award, for Jamaica, awarded by James Cook University for the best book published in Australia in the preceding year dealing with an aspect of Australian life
- 2014: Winner, Ashurst Business Literature Prize, for Boom
- 2019: Co-winner, Walkley Award for Sports Journalism, for "Caught Out: Cricket's Inflated Player Numbers Revealed", with Nigel Gladstone
- 2025: Longlisted, Walter Scott Prize for Historical Fiction for The First Friend
- 2025: Shortlisted, Adult category of the ARA Historical Novel Prize, for The First Friend

== Selected works ==
=== Novels ===
- Summerland. 2000.
- A Private Man (2004) (released in the UK as Adult Book (2005))
- Jamaica (2007)
- The Life (2011)
- The Wonder Lover (2015)
- Bluebird (2020)
- The First Friend (2024)
- The Second Child (2026)

=== Non-fiction ===
- Taylor And Beyond (2000)
- I Still Call Australia Home: The Qantas Story 1920–2005 (2005)
- 1788 Words or Less: A short short history of Australia (2005)
- Secrets of the Jury Room (2006); also serialised on ABC Radio
- Scattered: The Inside Story of Ice in Australia (2008)
- On Obsession (2008)
- The Greatest: The players, the moments, the matches 1993–2008 (2009)
- The Captains: The story behind Australia's second most important job (2010)
- Fierce Focus: Greg Chappell (2011)
- Bradman's War: How the 1948 invincibles turned the cricket pitch into a battlefield (2012)
- Never a Gentlemen's Game (2012)
- Boom: The Underground History of Australia, from Goldrush to GFC (2013)
- "Duopoly money : Coles, Woolworths and the price we pay for their domination". The Monthly, August 2014 (also titled "Supermarket Monsters: The Price of Coles' and Woolworths' Dominance" online)
- The Keepers: The players at the heart of Australian cricket (2015)
- Phillip Hughes: The Official Biography (co-authored with Peter Lalor) (2015; about Phillip Hughes)
