= Norma Khouri =

Jordanian American writer (born 1970)

Norma Khouri is the pen name of author Norma Bagain Toliopoulos (born Norma Bagain in Jordan in 1970). She is the author of the book titled Forbidden Love (known under its original title in Australia, Britain, and Commonwealth nations and as Honor Lost in the United States). The book was published by Random House in 2003.

The book, which became a bestseller, purported to describe the honor killing of her best friend in Jordan. After criticism from Jordanian writers and groups in regards to numerous errors, the book was exposed as a literary hoax in 2004.

== Early life ==
Khouri was born in Jordan in 1970, and moved to Chicago in the United States with her parents in 1973. She attended a Catholic school in South Chicago.

In 1993, she married John Toliopoulos, the father of her two children, Zoe and Christopher. In about 2001, Khouri, Toliopoulos and their children moved to Australia, from where she published a non-fiction account of the supposed honour killing of her best friend in Jordan. After the revelation of her literary hoax made headline news, she moved back to the United States. She is the subject of the 2007 film Forbidden Lie$.

== Forbidden Love hoax ==
On July 24, 2004, Malcolm Knox, literary editor of the Sydney Morning Herald, revealed that Khouri was not living in Jordan during 1993-1995 (the timeframe of Forbidden Love), but was living in Chicago with her husband, John Toliopoulos, and her two children. She had not lived in Jordan since her early childhood, except for a three-week stay during which she apparently researched the background for her book. Knox further revealed accusations that Khouri had left the United States while being investigated for defrauding an elderly neighbor.

Things were further complicated for Random House Australia, because Khouri was sponsored under the category of nomination for distinguished talent in 2002. On July 28, 2004, the Australian Department of Immigration and Multicultural Affairs announced that Khouri was cleared of violating visa conditions, but Khouri had already left the country of her own accord.

Khouri said she would co-operate with all requests to provide documentation and was said to be preparing to publish her next book A Matter of Honour in November 2004, again by Random House. It appears that this book was not released, as on August 18, 2004, Khouri admitted publicly that she took "literary licence" with the book, claiming that she did not receive any payment or royalties for writing it.
