= 1994 in Australian literature =

This article presents a list of the historical events and publications of Australian literature during 1994.

== Events ==
- Rodney Hall (writer) won the Miles Franklin Award for The Grisly Wife

== Major publications ==
=== Novels ===
- Thea Astley — Coda
- Lily Brett — Just Like That
- Peter Carey — The Unusual Life of Tristan Smith
- Helen Demidenko – The Hand That Signed the Paper
- Richard Flanagan — Death of a River Guide
- Kate Grenville — Dark Places
- Adib Khan — Seasonal Adjustments
- Drusilla Modjeska — The Orchard
- Tim Winton — The Riders

=== Short stories ===
- Marian Eldridge — The Wild Sweet Flowers
- Lucy Sussex – The Lottery : Nine Science Fiction Stories (edited)

=== Science fiction and fantasy ===
- Greg Egan — Permutation City
- Sean McMullen – Voices in the Light
- George Turner – Genetic Soldier

=== Crime and mystery ===
- Jon Cleary – Autumn Maze
- Peter Corris
  - Casino
  - Get Even
  - The Time Trap
- Marele Day – The Disappearances of Madalena Grimaldi
- Garry Disher – Crosskill
- Kerry Greenwood – Blood and Circuses
- Nicholas Hasluck – A Grain of Truth
- Barry Maitland – The Marx Sisters
- Shane Maloney – Stiff
- Glyn Parry — Monster Man
- Dorothy Porter — The Monkey's Mask

=== Children's and young adult fiction ===
- Pamela Allen — Clippity-Clop
- Gary Crew — The Watertower
- Mem Fox — Tough Boris
- Jackie French — Somewhere Around the Corner
- John Marsden — The Dead of Night
- James Moloney — Gracey
- Emily Rodda — Rowan and the Travellers

=== Poetry ===
- Robert Adamson — Waving to Hart Crane
- Bruce Beaver — Anima and Other Poems
- Peter Boyle — Coming Home From the World
- Dorothy Hewett — Peninsula
- Rhyll McMaster — Flying the Coop: New and Selected Poems 1972-1994
- Jan Owen — Night Rainbows

=== Drama ===
- Beatrix Christian — Blue Murder
- Michael Gow — Sweet Phoebe
- Hannie Rayson — Falling From Grace
- David Williamson — Sanctuary

=== Non-fiction ===
- John Birmingham — He Died with a Felafel in His Hand
- Gillian Bouras — Aphrodite and the Others
- Geraldine Brooks — Nine Parts of Desire
- Robert Dessaix — A Mother's Disgrace
- Tim Flannery — The Future Eaters
- David Horton — The Encyclopaedia of Aboriginal Australia
- Jan Ruff O'Herne — Fifty Years of Silence
- Susan Varga — Heddy and Me
- Donna Williams — Somebody Somewhere

== Awards and honours ==
- Patsy Adam-Smith AO "for service to community history, particularly through the preservation of national traditions and folklore and recording of oral histories"
- Laurie Hergenhan AO "for service to Australian literary scholarship and to education"
- Joan Phipson AM "for service to children's literature"
- Judith Rodriguez AM "for service to Australian literature, particularly in the area of poetry"

=== Lifetime achievement ===
Award	Author
Christopher Brennan Award	Judith Rodriguez
Patrick White Award	Dimitris Tsaloumas

=== Literary ===
Award	Author	Title	Publisher
The Age Book of the Year Award	Peter Carey	The Unusual Life of Tristan Smith	University of Queensland Press
ALS Gold Medal	Louis Nowra	Radiance and The Temple	Currency Press
Colin Roderick Award	Patrick Buckridge	The Scandalous Penton: A Biography of Brian Penton	University of Queensland Press
New South Wales Premier's Literary Awards – Book of the Year	Adib Khan	Seasonal Adjustments	Allen and Unwin
Nita Kibble Literary Award	Marion Halligan	Lovers' Knots	Heinemann
Western Australian Premier's Book Awards – Book of the Year	Dorothy Hewett	Peninsula	Fremantle Arts Centre Press

=== Fiction ===
==== International ====
Award	Category	Author	Title	Publisher
Commonwealth Writers' Prize	Best Novel, SE Asia and South Pacific region	David Malouf	Remembering Babylon	Random House
Commonwealth Writers' Prize	Best First Novel, SE Asia and South Pacific region	Fotini Epanomitis	The Mule's Foal	Allen & Unwin

==== National ====
Award	Author	Title	Publisher
Adelaide Festival Awards for Literature	Frank Moorhouse	Grand Days	William Heinemann
The Age Book of the Year Award	Peter Carey	The Unusual Life of Tristan Smith	University of Queensland Press
The Australian/Vogel Literary Award	Darren Williams	Swimming in Silk	Allen and Unwin
Miles Franklin Award	Rodney Hall	The Grisly Wife	Macmillan
New South Wales Premier's Literary Awards	Adib Khan	Seasonal Adjustments	Allen and Unwin
Victorian Premier's Literary Awards	John A. Scott	What I Have Written	McPhee Gribble
Western Australian Premier's Book Awards	Joan London	Letter to Constantine	Fremantle Arts Centre Press

=== Poetry ===
Award	Author	Title	Publisher
Adelaide Festival Awards for Literature	Andrew Lansdown	Between Glances	Fremantle Arts Centre Press
The Age Book of the Year Award	Dorothy Porter	The Monkey's Mask	Hyland House
Anne Elder Award	Not awarded		
Grace Leven Prize for Poetry	Not awarded		
Mary Gilmore Award	Deborah Staines	Now, Millenium	Spinifex Press
New South Wales Premier's Literary Awards	Barry Hill	Ghosting William Buckley	Heinemann
Victorian Premier's Literary Awards	Robert Gray	Certain Things	Heinemann
Western Australian Premier's Book Awards	Dorothy Hewett	Peninsula	Fremantle Arts Centre Press

=== Children and Young Adult ===
Award	Category	Author	Title	Publisher
Adelaide Festival Awards for Literature	Children's	Gary Crew	Angel's Gate	William Heinemann Australia
Children's Book of the Year Award	Older Readers	Isobelle Carmody	The Gathering	Penguin Books
Children's Book of the Year Award	Older Readers	Gary Crew	Angel's Gate	William Heinemann Australia
Children's Book of the Year Award	Picture Book	Gary Crew & Peter Gouldthorpe	First Light	Lothian
New South Wales Premier's Literary Awards	Young People's Literature	Ursula Dubosarsky	The White Guinea Pig	Viking Books
Victorian Premier's Prize for Young Adult Fiction		Ursula Dubosarsky	The White Guinea-Pig	Viking Books
Western Australian Premier's Book Awards	Children's	Mike Lefroy and Peter Kendall	Rosa's Famous Elbow	Fremantle Arts Centre Press

=== Science fiction and fantasy ===
Award	Category	Author	Title	Publisher
Australian SF Achievement Award	Best Australian Long Fiction	George Turner	The Destiny Makers	Morrow
Australian SF Achievement Award	Best Australian Short Fiction	Leanne Frahm	"Catalyst"	Terror Australis

=== Drama ===
Award	Category	Author	Title
New South Wales Premier's Literary Awards	FilmScript	Rolf de Heer	Bad Boy Bubby
New South Wales Premier's Literary Awards	Play	Michael Gurr	Sex Diary of an Infidel
Victorian Premier's Literary Awards	Drama	Louis Nowra	The Temple

=== Non-fiction ===
Award	Author	Title	Publisher
Adelaide Festival Awards for Literature	Susan Maushart	Sort of a Place Like Home: Remembering the Moore River Native Settlement	Fremantle Arts Centre Press
The Age Book of the Year Award	Jim Davidson	Lyrebird Rising: Louise Hanson-Dyer of Oiseau-Lyre 1884-1962	Melbourne University Press
New South Wales Premier's Literary Awards	David McKnight	Australia's Spies and Their Secrets	Allen & Unwin
New South Wales Premier's Literary Awards	Patrick Buckridge	The Scandalous Penton	University of Queensland Press
Victorian Premier's Literary Awards	Jim Davidson	Lyrebird Rising: Louise Hanson-Dyer of Oiseau-Lyre 1884-1962	Melbourne University Press

== Births ==
A list, ordered by date of birth (and, if the date is either unspecified or repeated, ordered alphabetically by surname) of births in 1994 of Australian literary figures, authors of written works or literature-related individuals follows, including year of death.

- 18 April — Alexandra Adornetto, actress and author who writes for children and young adults
- 25 June — Robbie Coburn, poet and young adult author.

== Deaths ==
A list, ordered by date of death (and, if the date is either unspecified or repeated, ordered alphabetically by surname) of deaths in 1994 of Australian literary figures, authors of written works or literature-related individuals follows, including year of birth.

- 28 January — Frank Hardy, novelist, best known for Power Without Glory (born 1917)
- 7 February — Rosemary Wighton, literary editor, author and advisor to the South Australian government on women's affairs (born 1925)
- 29 May — Nene Gare, writer and artist, best known for The Fringe Dwellers (born 1919)
- 7 September — James Clavell, novelist, screenwriter, director, and World War II veteran and prisoner of war (born 1921)
- 9 September — Hugh Atkinson (novelist), novelist, journalist, screenwriter and documentary film maker (born 1921)
- 16 December — Mary Durack, author and historian (born 1913)

== See also ==
- 1994 in Australia
- 1994 in literature
- 1994 in poetry
- List of years in literature
- List of years in Australian literature
