= Victorian Premier's Prize for Poetry =

The Victorian Premier's Prize for Poetry, formerly known as the C. J. Dennis Prize for Poetry, is a prize category in the annual Victorian Premier's Literary Award. As of 2011 it has an enumeration of A$25,000. The winner of this category prize vies with 4 other category winners for overall Victorian Prize for Literature valued at an additional A$100,000.

The prize was formerly known as the C. J. Dennis Prize for Poetry from inception until 2010, when the awards were re-established under the stewardship of the Wheeler Centre and restarted with new prize amounts and a new name. It was named after the early twentieth century vernacular poet C. J. Dennis.

== Victorian Premier's Prize for Poetry ==
Victorian Premier's Prize for Poetry winners and finalists
Year	Author	Title	Result	Ref.
2011	Cate Kennedy	The Taste of River Water	Winner	
2011	Libby Hart	This Floating World	Finalist	
2011	Claire Potter	Swallow	Finalist	
2012	John Kinsella	Armour	Winner	
2012	Michelle Cahill	Vishvarupa	Finalist	
2012	John Mateer	Southern Barbarians	Finalist	
2013	Not awarded			
2014 (Note: Prior to 2014, the award year was directly related to the year of publication. In 2014, the award year referred to books published in the previous year. That is, in 2012, the award went to books published in 2012. In 2014, the award went to books published in 2013.)	Jennifer Maiden	Liquid Nitrogen	Winner	
2014	Michael Brennan	Autoethnographic	Finalist	
2014	Brendan Ryan	Travelling Through the Family	Finalist	
2015	Jill Jones	The Beautiful Anxiety	Winner	
2015	Andy Kissane	Radiance	Finalist	
2015	Susan Bradley Smith	Bed For All Who Come	Finalist	
2016	Alan Loney	Crankhandle	Winner	
2016	Lucy Dougan	The Guardians	Finalist	
2016	Peter Rose	The Subject of Feeling	Finalist	
2017	Maxine Beneba Clarke	Carrying the World	Winner	
2017	Eileen Chong	Painting Red Orchids	Finalist	
2017	Tina Giannoukos	Bull Days	Finalist	
2018	Bella Li	Argosy	Winner	
2018	Jennifer Maiden	The Metronome	Finalist	
2018	Eddie Paterson	redactor	Finalist	
2019	Kate Lilley	Tilt	Winner	
2019	Eunice Andrada	Flood Damages	Finalist	
2019	Rae White	Milk Teeth	Finalist	
2020	Charmaine Papertalk Green	Nganajungu Yagu	Winner	
2020	Louise Crisp	Yuiquimbiang	Finalist	
2020	L. K. Holt	Birth Plan	Finalist	
2021	David Stavanger	Case Notes	Winner	
2021	Rebecca Jessen	Ask Me About the Future	Finalist	
2021	Ellen van Neerven	Throat	Finalist	
2022	Maria Takolander	Trigger Warning	Winner	
2022	Maxine Beneba Clarke	How Decent Folk Behave	Finalist	
2022	Andy Jackson	Human Looking	Finalist	
2023	Gavin Yuan Gao	At the Altar of Touch	Winner	
2023	Scott-Patrick Mitchell	Clean	Finalist	
2023	Simon Tedeschi	Fugitive	Finalist	
2024	Grace Yee	Chinese Fish	Winner	
2024	Susie Anderson	the body country	Finalist	
2024	Claire Miranda Roberts	Kangaroo Paw	Finalist	
2025	Jeanine Leane	Gawimarra: Gathering	Winner	
2025	Jake Goetz	Holocene Pointbreaks	Finalist	
2025	Hasib Hourani	rock flight	Finalist	
2026	Eunice Andrada	KONTRA	Winner	
2026	Evelyn Araluen	The Rot	Finalist	
2026	Ender Baskan	Two Hundred Million Musketeers	Finalist	

== C. J. Dennis Prize for Poetry (inactive) - Winners and shortlists ==
This award is no longer active. It was renamed in 2011 to Victorian Premier's Prize for Poetry (see above).

=== 1985–1989 ===
Year	Author	Title	Ref.	Ref.
1985	Rosemary Dobson	The Three Fates & Other Poems	Winner	
1985	Kevin Hart	Your Shadow	Winner	
1986	Rhyll McMaster	Washing the Money : Poems with Photographs	Winner	
1986	John A. Scott	St. Clair	Winner	
1986	Peter Kocan	Freedom to Breathe	Finalist	
1986	Shelton Lea	Poems from a Peach Melba Hat	Finalist	
1987	Lily Brett	The Auschwitz Poems	Winner	
1987	Jas Duke	Poems of War and Peace	Finalist	
1987	Alan Wearne	The Nightmarkets	Finalist	
1988	Judith Beveridge	The Domesticity of Giraffes	Winner	
1988	Diane Fahey	Metamorphoses	Finalist	
1988	Dimitris Tsaloumas	Falcon Drinking	Finalist	
1989	Gwen Harwood	Bone Scan	Winner	
1989	John Scott	Singles: Shorter Poems, 1982-1986	Finalist	
1989	John Tranter	Under Berlin	Finalist	

=== 1990–1999 ===
Year	Author	Title	Ref.	Ref.
1990	Robert Adamson	The Clean Dark	Winner	
1990	Lily Brett	After the War	Finalist	
1990	Fay Zwicky	Ask Me	Finalist	
1991	Jennifer Maiden	The Winter Baby	Winner	
1991	Ken Bolton	Two Poems : A Drawing of the Sky	Finalist	
1991	Gig Ryan	Excavation	Finalist	
1992	Robert Harris	Jane, Interlinear and Other Poems	Winner	
1992	Mudrooroo	The Garden of Gethsemane : Poems from the Lost Decade	Finalist	
1992	Norman Talbot	Four Zoas of Australia	Finalist	
1993	Les Murray	Translations from the Natural World	Winner	
1993	Kate Jennings	Cats, Dogs & Pitchforks	Finalist	
1993	Philip Salom	Feeding the Ghost	Finalist	
1994	Robert Gray	Certain Things	Winner	
1994	Rhyll McMaster	On My Empty Feet	Finalist	
1994	Peter Rose	The Catullan Rag	Finalist	
1995	Bruce Beaver	Anima and Other Poems	Winner	
1995	Aileen Kelly	Coming Up for Light	Finalist	
1995	Peter Porter	Millennial Fables	Finalist	
1996	Peter Bakowski	In the Human Night	Winner	
1996	Lionel Fogarty	New and Selected Poems	Finalist	
1996	J. S. Harry	Selected Poems	Finalist	
1997	Les Murray	Subhuman Redneck Poems	Winner	
1997	Judith Beveridge	Accidental Grace	Finalist	
1997	Peter Porter	Dragons in Their Pleasant Palaces	Finalist	
1998	Coral Hull	Broken Land	Winner	
1998	Fay Zwicky	The Gatekeeper's Wife	Finalist	
1999	Gig Ryan	Pure and Applied	Winner	
1999	M. T. C. Cronin	The World Beyond the Fig	Finalist	
1999	Philip Salom	New and Selected Poems	Finalist	

=== 2000–2010 ===
Year	Author	Title	Ref.	Ref.
2000	John Millett	Iceman	Winner	
2000	Alex Skovron	Infinite City	Finalist	
2000	Peter Steele	Invisible Riders	Finalist	
2001	John Mateer	Barefoot Speech	Winner	
2001	Robert Adamson	Mulberry Leaves: New and Selected Poems	Finalist	
2001	Rosemary Dobson	Untold Lives & Later Poems	Finalist	
2002	Robert Gray	Afterimages	Winner	
2002	Tracy Ryan	Hothouse	Finalist	
2002	Chris Wallace-Crabbe	By and Large	Finalist	
2003	Emma Lew	Anything the Landlord Touches	Winner	
2003	Jordie Albiston	The Fall	Finalist	
2003	S. K. Kelen	Goddess of Mercy	Finalist	
2004	Judith Beveridge	Wolf Notes	Winner	
2004	Michael Brennan	The Imageless World	Finalist	
2004	Anthony Lawrence	The Sleep of a Learning Man	Finalist	
2005	M. T. C. Cronin	<More Or Less Than>1-100	Winner	
2005	John Kinsella	Doppler Effect	Finalist	
2005	Morgan Yasbincek	Firelick	Finalist	
2006	John Tranter	Urban Myths: 210 Poems	Winner	
2006	B. R. Dionysius	Universal Andalusia	Finalist	
2006	Susan Hampton	The Kindly Ones	Finalist	
2007	Judy Johnson	Jack	Winner	
2007	Robert Adamson	The Goldfinches of Baghdad	Finalist	
2007	John Watson	Montale: A Biographical Anthology	Finalist	
2008	Lisa Gorton	Press Release	Winner	
2008	Judith Bishop	Event	Finalist	
2008	Barry Hill	As We Draw Ourselves	Finalist	
2009	Robert Adamson	The Golden Bird	Winner	
2009	Carol Jenkins	Fishing in the Devonian	Finalist	
2009	Bronwyn Lea	The Other Way Out	Finalist	
2010	Anna Kerdijk Nicholson	Possession	Winner	
2010	Peter Bakowski	Beneath Our Armour	Finalist	
2010	Ian McBryde	The Adoption Order	Finalist	
