= 1986 in Australian literature =

This article presents a list of the historical events and publications of Australian literature during 1986.

== Events ==
- Elizabeth Jolley won the 1986 Miles Franklin Award for The Well
- The Melbourne Writers Festival is held for the first time

== Major publications ==
=== Novels ===
- Margaret Barbalet — Blood in the Rain
- Janine Burke — Second Sight
- Blanche d'Alpuget — Winter in Jerusalem
- Elizabeth Jolley — The Well
- Rod Jones — Julia Paradise
- John Macgregor — Propinquity
- Christina Stead — I'm Dying Laughing: The Humourist
- Alan Wearne — The Nightmarkets
- Morris West — Cassidy
- Tim Winton — That Eye, the Sky
- Patrick White — Memoirs of Many in One

=== Crime and mystery ===
- Peter Corris
  - Deal Me Out
  - The Greenwich Apartments
- Tony Kenrick — China White

=== Science fiction and fantasy ===
- George Turner — "Shut the Door When You Go Out"
- Cherry Wilder — The Summer's King

=== Short stories ===
- Janette Turner Hospital — Dislocations
- Joan London — Sister Ships and Other Stories
- Sally Morgan — "The Letter"
- Archie Weller — Going Home
- Tim Winton — "Swimming to Salvation"

=== Children's and young adult fiction ===
- Graeme Base — Animalia
- Hesba Fay Brinsmead — Someplace Beautiful
- Victor Kelleher — Taronga
- Doug MacLeod — Sister Madge's Book of Nuns
- Emily Rodda — Pigs Might Fly
- Gillian Rubinstein — Space Demons

=== Poetry ===
- Lily Brett — The Auschwitz Poems
- Robert Harris — The Cloud Passes Over
- Susan Hampton and Kate Llewellyn – The Penguin Book of Australian Women Poets (edited)
- Philip Hodgins — Blood and Bone
- Rhyll McMaster — Washing the Money : Poems with Photographs
- Philip Neilson — The Penguin Book of Australian Satirical Verse (edited)
- Jan Owen — Boy with a Telescope
- John A. Scott — St. Clair: Three Narratives

=== Drama ===
- Michael Gow — Away

=== Non-fiction ===
- Gillian Bouras — A Foreign Wife
- Robert Hughes — The Fatal Shore
- Kylie Tennant — The Missing Heir

== Awards and honours ==
- Geoffrey Serle AO, for "service to scholarship and literature, particularly in the field of Australian history"
- Nicholas Hasluck AM, for "service to literature"
- Dorothy Hewett AM, for "service to literature"
- Barbara Jefferis AM, for "service to literature"
- Grace Perry AM, for "service to Australian literature, particularly as editor of Poetry Australia"
- Russel Ward AM, for "service to literature, particularly in the field of Australian history"

=== Lifetime achievement ===
Award	Author
Christopher Brennan Award	Not awarded
Patrick White Award	John Morrison

=== Literary awards ===
Award	Author	Title	Publisher
The Age Book of the Year Award	Joan London	Sister Ships and Other Stories	Fremantle Press
ALS Gold Medal	Thea Astley	Beachmasters	Penguin Books
Colin Roderick Award	Fr Tom Boland	James Duhig	University of Queensland Press

=== Fiction awards ===
Award	Author	Title	Publisher
Adelaide Festival Awards for Literature	Helen Garner	The Children's Bach	McPhee Gribble
The Age Book of the Year Award	Joan London	Sister Ships and Other Stories	Fremantle Press
The Australian/Vogel Literary Award	Robin Walton	Glace Fruits	Allen and Unwin
Miles Franklin Award	Elizabeth Jolley	The Well	Viking Press
New South Wales Premier's Literary Awards	Helen Garner	Postcards from Surfers	McPhee Gribble
Victorian Premier's Literary Awards	Peter Carey	Illywhacker	University of Queensland Press
Western Australian Premier's Book Awards	Peter Cowan	The Colour of the Sky	Fremantle Arts Centre Press

=== Children and Young Adult ===
Award	Category	Author	Title	Publisher
Adelaide Festival Awards for Literature	Children's	Ivan Southall	The Long Night Watch	Methuen Publishing
Children's Book of the Year Award	Older Readers	Thurley Fowler	The Green Wind	Rigby
Children's Book of the Year Award	Picture Book	Terry Denton	Felix & Alexander	Oxford University Press
New South Wales Premier's Literary Awards	Young People's Literature	James Aldridge	The True Story of Spit MacPhee	Viking/Penguin Books Australia

=== Science fiction and fantasy ===
Award	Category	Author	Title	Publisher
Australian SF Achievement Award	Best Australian Science Fiction	Peter Carey	Illywhacker	University of Queensland Press

=== Poetry ===
Award	Author	Title	Publisher
Adelaide Festival Awards for Literature	Robert Gray	Selected Poems 1963-1983	Angus and Robertson
Anne Elder Award	Jan Owen	Boy with Telescope	Angus and Robertson
Grace Leven Prize for Poetry	Rhyll McMaster	Washing the Money : Poems with Photographs	Angus and Robertson
Mary Gilmore Award	Stephen J. Williams	A Crowd of Voices	Pariah Press
New South Wales Premier's Literary Awards	Robert Gray	Selected Poems 1963-1983	Angus & Robertson
Victorian Premier's Literary Awards	Rhyll McMaster	Washing the Money : Poems with Photographs	Angus & Robertson
Victorian Premier's Literary Awards	John A. Scott	St. Clair	University of Queensland Press

=== Drama ===
Award	Category	Author	Title
New South Wales Premier's Literary Awards	Script	Peter Carey & Ray Lawrence	Bliss
New South Wales Premier's Literary Awards	Play	Michael Gow	Away
Victorian Premier's Literary Awards	Drama	Janis Balodis	Too Young for Ghosts

=== Non-fiction ===
Award	Author	Title	Publisher
Adelaide Festival Awards for Literature	R. M. Gibbs	A History of Prince Alfred College	Peacock Publications
The Age Book of the Year Award	Garry Kinnane	George Johnston: A Biography	Nelson
New South Wales Premier's Literary Awards	George Munster	A Paper Prince	Viking
New South Wales Premier's Literary Awards	Phillip Pepper with Tess De Araugo	The Kurnai of Gippsland, Volume One	Hyland House
Victorian Premier's Literary Awards	John Bryson	Evil Angels	Viking

== Births ==
A list, ordered by date of birth (and, if the date is either unspecified or repeated, ordered alphabetically by surname) of births in 1986 of Australian literary figures, authors of written works or literature-related individuals follows, including year of death.

- 23 August — Jack Heath, writer of fiction for children and adults

== Deaths ==
A list, ordered by date of death (and, if the date is either unspecified or repeated, ordered alphabetically by surname) of deaths in 1986 of Australian literary figures, authors of written works or literature-related individuals follows, including year of birth.

- 2 March — Margaret Trist, novelist and short story writer (born 1914)
- 27 September — Olga Masters, writer, journalist, novelist and short story writer (born 1919)
- 10 November — Laurence Collinson, British and Australian playwright, actor, poet, journalist, and secondary school teacher (born 1925)

== See also ==
- 1986 in Australia
- 1986 in literature
- 1986 in poetry
- List of years in literature
- List of years in Australian literature
