= 1982 in Australian literature =

This article presents a list of the historical events and publications of Australian literature during 1982.

== Events ==
- Thomas Keneally won the 1982 Booker–McConnell Prize for Schindler's Ark, the first Australian to win the award.
- Rodney Hall (writer) won the 1982 Miles Franklin Award for Just Relations

== Major publications ==
=== Novels ===
- Thea Astley — An Item from the Late News
- Jean Bedford — Sister Kate
- Rodney Hall — Just Relations
- Thomas Keneally — Schindler's Ark
- David Malouf – Fly Away Peter
- Gerald Murnane — The Plains
- Tim Winton — An Open Swimmer

=== Crime and mystery ===
- Peter Corris — The Marvellous Boy

=== Science fiction and fantasy ===
- Glenda Adams — Games of the Strong
- Damien Broderick — The Judas Mandala
- Terry Dowling — "The Man Who Walks Away Behind the Eyes"

=== Short stories ===
- Beverley Farmer — "Snake"

=== Children's and young adult fiction ===
- Joan Lindsay — Syd Sixpence
- Jan Ormerod — Moonlight
- Nadia Wheatley — Five Times Dizzy

=== Poetry ===
- Les Murray
  - Equanimities
  - The Vernacular Republic: Poems 1961–1981
- Vivian Smith – Tide Country
- John Tranter — Selected Poems
- Fay Zwicky – Kaddish and Other Poems

=== Drama ===
- Jack Davis — The Dreamers
- Louis Nowra — Spellbound
- David Williamson — The Perfectionist

=== Non-fiction ===
- Blanche d'Alpuget — Robert J. Hawke: A Biography
- Edmund Campion — Rockchoppers: Growing up Catholic in Australia
- Nancy Keesing — Lily on the Dustbin: Slang of Australian Women and Families
- Geoffrey Serle — John Monash

== Awards and honours ==
=== Officer of the Order of Australia (AO) ===
- Donald Horne

=== Member of the Order of Australia (AM) ===
- R. D. Fitzgerald
- Hal Porter

=== Lifetime achievement ===
Award	Author
Christopher Brennan Award	Vincent Buckley
Patrick White Award	Bruce Beaver

=== Literary awards ===
Award	Author	Title	Publisher
The Age Book of the Year Award	David Malouf	Fly Away Peter	Chatto & Windus
ALS Gold Medal	No award		
Colin Roderick Award	Geoffrey Serle	John Monash : A Biography	Melbourne University Press
NSW Premier's Special Award	Christina Stead		

=== Fiction ===
==== International ====
Award	Author	Title	Publisher
Booker Prize	Thomas Keneally	Schindler's Ark	Hodder and Stoughton

==== National ====
Award	Author	Title	Publisher
The Age Book of the Year Award	David Malouf	Fly Away Peter	Chatto & Windus
The Australian/Vogel Literary Award	Brian Castro	Birds of Passage	Allen and Unwin
The Australian/Vogel Literary Award	Nigel Krauth	Matilda, My Darling	Allen and Unwin
Miles Franklin Award	Rodney Hall	Just Relations	Penguin Books
New South Wales Premier's Literary Awards	Peter Carey	Bliss	University of Queensland Press
Western Australian Premier's Book Awards	Archie Weller	Day of the Dog	Allen & Unwin

=== Children and Young Adult ===
Award	Category	Author	Title	Publisher
Children's Book of the Year Award	Older Readers	Colin Thiele	The Valley Between	Opal Books
Children's Book of the Year Award	Picture Book	Jan Ormerod	Sunshine	Penguin Books
New South Wales Premier's Literary Awards	Children's Book Award	Nan Hunt and Craig Smith	Whistle Up the Chimney	William Collins

=== Science fiction and fantasy ===
Award	Category	Author	Title	Publisher
Australian SF Achievement Award	Best Australian Science Fiction	David Lake	The Man Who Loved Morlocks	Hyland House

=== Poetry ===
Award	Author	Title	Publisher
Anne Elder Award	Kate Llewellyn	Trader Kate and the Elephants	Friendly Street Poets
Anne Elder Award	Peter Goldsworthy	Readings from Ecclesiastes	Angus & Robertson
Grace Leven Prize for Poetry	Vivian Smith	Tide Country	Angus & Robertson
New South Wales Premier's Literary Awards	Fay Zwicky	Kaddish and Other Poems	University of Queensland Press

=== Non-fiction ===
Award	Author	Title	Publisher
The Age Book of the Year Award	Geoffrey Serle	John Monash: A Biography	Melbourne University Press
New South Wales Premier's Literary Awards	Richard Haese	Rebels and Precursors: The Revolutionary Years of Australian Art	Allen Lane

== Births ==
A list, ordered by date of birth (and, if the date is either unspecified or repeated, ordered alphabetically by surname) of births in 1982 of Australian literary figures, authors of written works or literature-related individuals follows, including year of death.

- 1 January — Craig Silvey, novelist, author of Jasper Jones
- 22 November — Alasdair Duncan, author and journalist
- 22 December — Sarah Holland-Batt, contemporary Australian poet, critic and academic

Unknown date

- Kate Gordon, author of young adult fiction

== Deaths ==
A list, ordered by date of death (and, if the date is either unspecified or repeated, ordered alphabetically by surname) of deaths in 1982 of Australian literary figures, authors of written works or literature-related individuals follows, including year of birth.

- 11 February — Albert Facey, writer, best known as author of A Fortunate Life (born 1894)
- 8 October — Joice NanKivell Loch, author, journalist and humanitarian worker (died in Greece) (born 1887)
- 15 November — Eve Pownall, writer for children and historian (born 1901)

== See also ==
- 1982 in Australia
- 1982 in literature
- 1982 in poetry
- List of years in literature
- List of years in Australian literature
