= St. Clair (collection) =

1986 Australian poetry collection by John A. Scott

St. Clair : Three Narratives
- Author: John A. Scott
- Language: English
- Genre: Poetry collection
- Publisher: University of Queensland Press
- Publication date: 1986
- Publication place: Australia
- Media type: Print
- Pages: 132 pp
- Awards: 1986 Victorian Premier's Prize for Poetry, winner
- ISBN: 070221907X

St. Clair : Three Narratives is a collection of poems by Australian poet John A. Scott, published by University of Queensland Press in 1986.

The collection contains 21 poems. The poems in the "St. Clair" poetry sequence were originally published in Neither Nuked Nor Crucified and Other Poems edited by Christopher Pollnitz, a 1984 Australian poetry anthology, with the remainder being published here for the first time.

It was the co-winner of the 1986 Victorian Premier's Prize for Poetry with Rhyll McMaster's Washing the Money : Poems with Photographs.

== Contents ==
- "Preface (for Helen Williams of Ainslie 'If She Wants It')"
- "1. St. Clair : An Opening Description"
- "2. St. Clair : In Which the Last of the Legitimate Patients Considers His Health"
- "3. St. Clair : A View from a Train"
- "4. St. Clair : The Homunculus Child"
- "5. St. Clair : A Shorter History of the Insane"
- "6. St. Clair : Reverie"
- "7. St. Clair : The Increasing Difficulty of Silence"
- "8. St. Clair : Reverie"
- "9. St. Clair : In Which a Patient is Cured of Insanity and a Rainbow Appears"
- "10. St. Clair : A Letter"
- "11. St. Clair : In Which Warren Confides in Sheehan"
- "12. St. Clair : In Which There is a Disturbance in Finchley's Room"
- "13. St. Clair : On Truth"
- "14. St. Clair : Inside Two Bedrooms"
- "15. St. Clair : In Which Warren's Ex-Wife Might be Seen to Extend the Metaphor"
- "16. St. Clair : In Which a Number of Decisions are Reached"
- "17. St. Clair : Finchley Goes Home"
- "18. St. Clair : A Closing Incident"
- "19. St. Clair : Envoi"
- "Run in the Stocking"

== Critical reception ==
In a review of the collection for The Age newspaper Jennifer Strauss noted that "readers will probably struggle for bearings in Scott's treatment [of incarceration of political dissidents], which is multi-focused, elliptic and linguistically demanding as he tries to image a world both phantasmagoric and horrifyingly prosaic."

== Publication history ==
After the collection's initial publication by the University of Queensland Press in 1986 it was reprinted as follows:

- 1990 Picador, Australia
- 2021 Untapped, Australia

== Notes ==
- Dedication: For Kathryn Riessen, Robert Moore and Steve Dunne
- Epigraphs:

Only what prepares it, only what destroys it can be told. - Gide, The Immortalist

And if I speak to you outside of what I have written, these marginal comments cannot have the value of what I have written, these marginal comments cannot have the value of the work itself. - Hegel, 'Preface' to the Phenomenology of the Mind

What is not herein described must be guessed. - Spare, The Grimoire of Zos

== See also ==
- 1986 in Australian literature
