= Anima and Other Poems =

1994 Australian poetry collection by Bruce Beaver

- Author: Bruce Beaver
- Language: English
- Genre: Poetry collection
- Publisher: University of Queensland Press
- Publication date: 1994
- Publication place: Australia
- Media type: Print
- Pages: 97 pp
- Awards: 1995 Victorian Premier's Prize for Poetry, winner
- ISBN: 0702226122

Anima and Other Poems is a collection of poems by Australian poet Bruce Beaver, published by University of Queensland Press in 1994.

The collection contains 23 poems. Most of the poems had been previously published in Australian literary and poetry journals such as Southerly, Scripsi, Pluralist, Poetry Australia and Voices, with several being published here for the first time.

It was the winner of the 1995 Victorian Premier's Prize for Poetry.

== Contents ==
- "Pellucid Days : I (for Moya)"
- "Pellucid Days : II"
- "Pellucid Days : III"
- "The Dispensation (IM George)"
- "The Lovers"
- "Camp Cook"
- "Earth and Fern-Softened Rock-Face"
- "From Norfolk Island : Kingstone"
- "From Norfolk Island : Phillip Island"
- "From Norfolk Island : Headstone Point"
- "From Norfolk Island : Cemetery Bay"
- "From Norfolk Island : Chalgrove Estate"
- "From Norfolk Island : Mount Pitt"
- "Lament for Frances Gumm"
- "Night Watch"
- "Out of the Race : A Dream"
- "Montsegur 1244 a.d."
- "Autumn Glory"
- "Genesis Rock"
- "Envoy"
- "The Amazons : A Fable"
- "A Nest of Nonnets"
- "Anima"

== Critical reception ==
Reviewing the volume for The Sydney Morning Herald critic Heather Cam called it "a varied and daring collection from one of our senior poets."

In Australian Book Review Simon Patten noted that Beaver's poems may not resonate with some: "I can imagine some readers finding Beaver's work old-fashioned or even deliberately archaic in its use of language, but while his register is often elevated, there is nothing overblown or impossibly obscure in his choice of words."

== See also ==
- 1994 in Australian literature
