= John Forbes (poet) =

Australian poet

John Forbes (1 September 1950 – 23 January 1998) was an Australian poet.

Forbes was born in Melbourne, but during his childhood his family lived in northern Queensland, Malaya and New Guinea. He went to the University of Sydney, and his circle of friends included the poets Robert Adamson, Martin Johnston, and John Tranter. It was at this time that the work of the American poets Ted Berrigan, John Ashbery and Frank O’Hara made a strong and lasting impression on him.

He returned to live in Melbourne in the late 1980s, where he became the poetry editor of Scripsi. His friends around this time included the poets Gig Ryan, Laurie Duggan and Alan Wearne.

Forbes died in Melbourne of a heart attack, aged 47.

== Works ==
- Collected Poems, 1970–1998; 2001, Brandl & Schlesinger, ISBN 1-876040-27-0.
- Damaged Glamour; 1998, Brandl & Schlesinger, ISBN 1-876040-10-6.
- Troubador; 1998, Folio/Salt.
- Humidity; 1998, Equipage.
- New and Selected Poems; 1992, Angus & Robertson, ISBN 0-207-16951-9.
- Thin ice & other poems; 1989, Surfers Paradise Press.
- The Stunned Mullet; 1988, Hale & Iremonger.
- Stalin's Holidays; 1980, Transit Poetry.
- Drugs; 1979, Black Lamb Press.
- On the Beach; 1977, Sea Cruise Books.
- Tropical Skiing; 1976, Angus & Robertson.

== Related works ==
- Ken Bolton (ed.) Homage to John Forbes. (Brandl & Schlesinger, 2002)
