= Kaddish and Other Poems (Zwicky collection) =

1982 poetry collection by Fay Zwicky

- Author: Fay Zwicky
- Language: English
- Genre: Poetry collection
- Publisher: University of Queensland Press
- Publication date: 1982
- Publication place: Australia
- Media type: Print
- Pages: 52 pp.
- Awards: 1982 New South Wales State Literary Awards — Kenneth Slessor Prize, winner

Kaddish and Other Poems is the second collection of poetry by Australian author Fay Zwicky, published by University of Queensland Press, in 1982.

The collection contains 25 poems from a variety of sources. It was the winner of the 1982 New South Wales State Literary Awards — Kenneth Slessor Prize.

== Contents ==
- "Kaddish (for My Father Born 1903, Died at Sea, 1967)"
- "Cleft"
- "Dreams"
- "The Artist (after Isaac Bashevis Singer)"
- "Identity"
- "After Such Knowledge"
- "Reckoning"
- "The Stone Dolphin"
- "Jack Frost"
- "Tiger Heart"
- "Lamb"
- "Mrs Noah Speaks"
- "Lemur"
- "Bat"
- "Mouse"
- "Mink"
- "Wolf-Song"
- "Tiger"
- "Hipposonnets"
- "Giraffe"
- "Whale Psalm"
- "Elephant"
- "The Poet Gives a Reading"
- "The Poet Puts it Away"
- "The Poet Asks Forgiveness"

== Critical reception ==
Reviewing the collection for The Sydney Morning Herald poet and critic Bruce Beaver found much to like about the book: "There doesn't seem to me to be anything like it in the thousands of books of poetry published in this country. That makes it unique and on its own would be almost good enough." He concluded by noting that this is a "book to savor for its poetic colour and its variety."

In The Bulletin Geoffrey Dutton praised the title poem and then commented: "Humor and pain strike odd blows at each other when they come together, and Fay Zwicky is one of the rare ones who can record those blows."

== Awards ==
- 1982 New South Wales State Literary Awards — Kenneth Slessor Prize, winner

== See also ==
- 1982 in Australian literature
