= The Monkey's Mask (verse novel) =

1994 crime novel by Dorothy Porter

- Author: Dorothy Porter
- Language: English
- Genre: verse novel, crime fiction
- Publisher: Hyland House
- Publication date: 1994
- Publication place: Australia
- Media type: Print (Paperback)
- Pages: 255
- Awards: 1994 The Age Book of the Year Poetry Prize, winner
- ISBN: 1875657436

The Monkey's Mask (1994) is a crime novel written in verse by Australian author Dorothy Porter. It was originally published by Hyland House.

It was the winner of The Age Book of the Year Award Poetry Prize in 1994, and was later adapted into a film of the same name.

== Plot summary ==
Private Investigator Jill Fitzpatrick is engaged to look for the missing university student Mickey, daughter to a wealthy Sydney North Shore family. Mickey has left behind a cache of love poems which are rather violent and sadomasochistic. These lead Fitzpatrick into the depths of the Sydney poetry scene and into a relationship with Professor Diana Maitland, Mickey's University lecturer.

== Critical reception ==
Reviewing the novel for Australian Book Review Jenny Digby finds "There are murders and betrayals and red herrings and a number of nefarious characters and the plot races along at break-neck speed as the words race down the page. Porter's language is lean, colloquial, raw, yet rich in imagery and that sensuousness for which she is renowned." She concluded by calling this a book "which transgresses boundaries between poetry and fiction, which makes poetry accessible, readable, exciting".

The novel was reviewed twice in the 3rd September 1994 edition of The Sydney Morning Herald, first by poet Heather Cam, and then by crime writer Marele Day. Cam noted that "This hybrid work evades neat classification: it's poetic fiction; a crime thriller with a lesbian private investigator at its centre; a murder mystery where the prime suspects are (wait for it and tremble) poets!" Day found that "There's a strange alchemy at work here, as if Porter has distilled storytelling to its essence and fed it to us homeopathically. Tiny drops, soluble in alcohol. Imbibe and feel it work its way through your system."

== Publication history ==
After the book's initial publication in Australia in 1994 by Hyland House it was reprinted as follows:

- 1995 Arcade Publishing, USA
- 1997 Serpent's Tail, UK
- 2000 Pan Macmillan, Australia

The book was also translated into German in 1997 and Italian in 1999.

== Awards and nominations ==
- 1994 The Age Book of the Year Award, winner

== Film adaptation ==
The novel was adapted into a film of the same name in 2000, directed by Samantha Lang from a script by Anne Kennedy and Dorothy Porter. The film featured Susie Porter as Jill Fitzpatrick and Kelly McGillis as Diana Maitland.

== Notes ==
- Dedication: for Gwen Harwood
- Epigraph:
  - Year after year / On the monkey's face / A monkey's mask. Basho
  - 'What do you want a poet for?' / 'To save the City, of course.' Aristophanes
  - You see these grey hairs? Well, making whoopee with the intelligentsia was the way I earned them. Dorothy Parker
- You can read an extract from the novel, as a poem titled "Water and Chemicals", in The Age newspaper.
- The author was interviewed about the book by Sarah Walker for The Sydney Morning Herald
