= Coral Hull =

Contemporary Australian poet

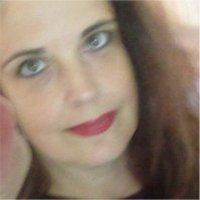
- Self portrait
- Born: Coral Eileen Hull; 12 December 1965 (age 60); Sydney, Australia
- Occupation: poet
- Awards: 1998 Victorian Premier's Prize for Poetry, winner

Coral Hull (born 1965) is an author, poet, artist and photographer living in Darwin, Australia. She has authored many books, including poetry, fiction, non-fiction, artwork and digital photography. Her areas of special interest have been in ethics, animal rights, autism, consciousness, multiplicity, metaphysics and the paranormal. Her book on psychokinesis titled "Walking with the Angels: The RSPK Journals" was completed in 2007. Coral was also a trance medium and a channeler involved in the new age and the occult. Hull became a born again Christian in late 2009.

== Early life and work ==
Born autistic, in Sydney, Australia, Coral Hull was raised under disadvantaged circumstances in the working class suburb of Liverpool in Sydney's west. Hull became concerned with issues of social justice and spirituality from an early age. She wrote her first poem about a rainforest at age thirteen. Hull became an ethical vegan and an animal rights advocate who has spent much of her life working voluntarily on behalf of animals, children and planet earth, as an individual and for various non-profit organisations.

== Education ==
Hull holds a Bachelor of Creative Arts from the University of Wollongong, a Master of Arts from Deakin University and a Doctor of Creative Arts from the University of Wollongong, New South Wales, Australia. She also completed the first year of a Bachelor of Visual Arts majoring in conceptual art at the South Australian College of Advanced Education.

== Work as an editor ==
She was the executive editor and publisher of Thylazine: The Australian Journal of Arts, Ethics & Literature. It had articles, interviews and reviews of the creative works of Australian poets, writers, artists and photographers. She was also the director of the Thylazine Foundation which works on arts, ethics and literature.

== Bibliography ==
=== Books ===
In chronological order:

- Reed-Song: Uncollected Early Poems (poetry)
- The Air and the Fence Post (short fiction)
- Fear of the Home (fiction)
- The Holistic Schizophrenic (experimental prose)
- Newton's Neighbourhood (experimental prose)
- Earth-Spirit (poetry chapbook with Margaret Curtis)
- Thirty Six Hours (prose)
- In The Dog Box of Summer (poetry)
- William’s Mongrels (poetry)
- How Do Detectives Make Love? (poetry)
- Psychic Gun (poetry)
- Bestiary (poetry)
- Broken Land (5 Days in Bre) (poetry)
- Point-Blank-Poor (poetry)
- Rose Street Archeology (experimental prose poetry)
- Vegan, Vegas (prose poems)
- The Secret Horses of Peterborough (poetry)
- Gangsters (prose)
- The City of Detroit Is Inside Me (prose)
- Life Forms That Nobody Loves (experimental prose/ poetry)
- Zoo (poetry with John Kinsella)
- Work The Sex (prose)
- Notes From The Big Park (prose poems)
- Holy City (poetry chapbook)
- "A Note For Johnny" (poetry chapbook)
- Remote (photography)
- Branto We Dream (selected poems)
- Landscape Photography With Dogs (poetry chapbook)
- I Will Never Live in Mosman (short fiction)
- A Crocodile’s Daydream (selected poems)
- Galapagos (photography)
- Portrait (photography)
- Inland (photography)
- Into The Red Country: Selected Poems on My Father (selected poems)
- Coral Hull: Selected Poems: 1986-2001 (selected [poems)
- The Preacher (poetry chapbook)
- Mermaid: The Woman on the Edge of the Sea (poetry chapbook)
- Into The Mirror: Selected Poems on My Mother (selected poems)
- "Come And See Me" (photography)
- Battery Hen (prose)
- The Noise of Flowers (artwork)
- The Straight Road Inland (poetry)
- Inland (photography)
- Coral Hull: Selected Poems: 1986-2001 (poetry)
- "A Note For Johnny" (poetry)
- Roadkill Roos (photography)
- The North Woods (poetry)
- My Life As A Dream: The Voyager System (prose)
- Walking with the Angels: The RSPK Journals (autobiography)
- The RSPK Journals (prose)
- Faery Wood (poetry)
- Coral Hull: Poetry Inspired by the Lord of the Rings (poetry)
- Coral Hull: Collected Poems: 1986-2001 (poetry)
- Coral Hull: Uncollected Poems (poetry)
- Mackenzie Knight (testimony autobiography)
- The Dyatlov Pass Incident (non-fiction)
- A Child of Wrath: A God of Love (testimony autobiography)

== Awards ==
- 1998 Victorian Premier's Prize for Poetry, winner for Broken Land
