= Patrick White Award =

Australian literary award

The Patrick White Award is an annual literary prize established by Patrick White. White used his 1973 Nobel Prize in Literature award to establish a trust for this prize.

The $25,000 cash award is given to a writer who has been highly creative over a long period but has not necessarily received adequate recognition. White stipulated that the award be announced the Friday after the Melbourne Cup to turn attention from sport to literature. The 2010 award was reduced to $18,000 because of the economic slump, and in 2012 it was $23,000. In 2020 the winner received $15,000. Writers are automatically eligible without the necessity for submissions.

== Winners ==
- 2026 Michael Farrell
- 2025 David Brooks
- 2024 Pi O
- 2023 Alex Skovron
- 2022 Antigone Kefala
- 2021 Adam Aitken
- 2020 Gregory Day
- 2019 Jordie Albiston
- 2018 Samuel Wagan Watson
- 2017 Tony Birch
- 2016 Carmel Bird
- 2015 Joan London
- 2014 Brian Castro
- 2013 Louis Nowra
- 2012 Amanda Lohrey
- 2011 Robert Adamson
- 2010 David Foster
- 2009 Beverley Farmer
- 2008 John Romeril
- 2007 David Rowbotham
- 2006 Morris Lurie
- 2005 Fay Zwicky
- 2004 Nancy Phelan
- 2003 Janette Turner Hospital
- 2002 Tom Hungerford
- 2001 Geoff Page
- 2000 Thomas Shapcott
- 1999 Gerald Murnane
- 1998 Alma De Groen
- 1997 Vivian Smith
- 1996 Elizabeth Harrower
- 1995 Elizabeth Riddell
- 1994 Dimitris Tsaloumas
- 1993 Amy Witting
- 1992 Peter Cowan
- 1991 David Martin
- 1990 Robert Gray
- 1989 Thea Astley
- 1988 Roland Robinson
- 1987 William Hart-Smith
- 1986 John Morrison
- 1985 Judah Waten (posthumous)
- 1984 Rosemary Dobson
- 1983 Marjorie Barnard
- 1982 Bruce Beaver
- 1981 Dal Stivens
- 1980 Bruce Dawe
- 1979 Randolph Stow
- 1978 Gwen Harwood
- 1977 Sumner Locke Elliott
- 1976 John Blight
- 1975 David Campbell
- 1974 Christina Stead
