= Letters to Live Poets =

1969 poetry collection by Bruce Beaver

- Author: Bruce Beaver
- Language: English
- Genre: poetry
- Publisher: South Head Press, Sydney
- Publication date: 1969
- Publication place: Australia
- Media type: Print
- Pages: 64 pp
- ISBN: 0901760013
- Preceded by: Open at Random : Poems
- Followed by: Lauds and Plaints : Poems (1968-1972)

Letters to Live Poets (1969) is the fourth poetry collection by the Australian poet Bruce Beaver. It won the Grace Leven Prize for Poetry in 1970.

The collection consists of 34 poems, all of which are published in this collection for the first time.

== Contents ==
All of the poems in the collection are titled and numbered in sequence using Roman numerals, except for the first which is titled "Letters to Live Poets : Frank O'Hara". Frank O'Hara was an American poet who was killed in a car accident in 1966.

== Critical reception ==
The Oxford Companion to Australian Literature called it Beaver's "major work" and noted that the book formed a "livre composé", a volume designed not as a collection of poems, but as a single poem, sustained through changing moods and verse-forms. They also note that the book was written "with obsessional purpose and speed, because Beaver believed he was losing his rationality".

In a long essay examining the book's legacy and influence, Robert Savage notes, "The American influences on Letters to Live Poets, particular the influence of American confessional poetry, are well documented, and prompt James Tulip to call Letters «the most American work to have come out of Australia.»"

== Awards ==
- 1970 - winner Grace Leven Prize for Poetry

== See also ==
- 1969 in Australian literature
- 1969 in poetry
