= Broken Land (collection) =

1997 Australian poetry collection by Coral Hull

Broken Land : 5 Days in Bre, 1995
- Author: Coral Hull
- Language: English
- Genre: Poetry collection
- Publisher: Five Islands Press
- Publication date: 1997
- Publication place: Australia
- Media type: Print
- Pages: 68 pp
- Awards: 1998 Victorian Premier's Prize for Poetry, winner
- ISBN: 0864184506

Broken Land : 5 Days in Bre, 1995 is a collection of poems by Australian poet Coral Hull, published by Five Island Press in 1997.

The collection contains 56 original poems.

It was the winner of the 1998 Victorian Premier's Prize for Poetry.

== Synopsis ==
"Broken Land is a collection of twelve poetic sequences which record five days spent in the small outback New South Wales town of Brewarrina (the Bre of the title)."

== Contents ==
- "Day One : Arriving in Brewarrina : Topography"
- "Day One : Arriving in Brewarrina : Stranger in Town"
- "Day One : Dad's House"
- "Day One : Two Boxes for Bindo : Dog as Landscape"
- "Day One : Two Boxes for Bindo : Going to the Toilet Where Bindo Sits on the Path"
- "Day One : Town Gossip : Along the Wall"
- "Day One : Town Gossip : A Word of Caution"
- "Day One : Town Gossip : Dignity"
- "Day One : Town Gossip : Those Dreamtime Dots"
- "Day One : Town Gossip : Biggie-Billa the Porcupine"
- "Day One : Town Gossip : A House Catches Fire on Incubation Avenue"
- "Day One : Town Gossip : Putting the Fire Out"
- "Day One : Town Gossip : The Bre Dentist"
- "Day One : Town Gossip : Carp as a Solution"
- "Day One : Town Gossip : Frost on the Citrus"
- "Day One : Town Gossip : Conversation with the Cockey's Son"
- "Day One : Town Gossip : The Longer You Stay"
- "Day One : Town Gossip : Apathy"
- "Day One : Town Gossip : 'Abo Lovers' and 'Tykes'"
- "Day One : Town Gossip : Concentric Circles"
- "Day One : Town Gossip : Saving the Town"
- "Day One : Landscapes of Smashed Glass : Bre Cemetery"
- "Day One : Landscapes of Smashed Glass : White Lady"
- "Day One : Landscapes of Smashed Glass : Bre Weir"
- "Day One : Mirijula - Spirit Dog : Cry of the Pup"
- "Day One : Mirijula - Spirit Dog : On the Back Step"
- "Day One : Mirijula - Spirit Dog : My Mirijula"
- "Day Two : The Bre Roo Works : Inside the Boning Factory"
- "Day Two : The Bre Roo Works : The Presence of the Poet"
- "Day Two : The Bre Roo Works : 'The Boys Giving Me a Hard Time'"
- "Day Two : The Bre Roo Works : The Dark Dead Blood of the Kangaroo"
- "Day Two : Songs of Survival and Extinction : Red Hill Roos"
- "Day Two : Songs of Survival and Extinction : Wildflowers at Bre"
- "Day Two : Songs of Survival and Extinction : Kangaroo Countdown"
- "Day Three : Narran Lake Conversations : Coming Home from the Wheat Lake"
- "Day Three : Narran Lake Conversations : Breaking Down in the Desert"
- "Day Three : Narran Lake Conversations : A Dead Fox on the Grid Sign"
- "Day Three : Outback Adventures : Punching the Piglet"
- "Day Three : Outback Adventures : The Tourist Shooting Holiday"
- "Day Four : The Goat Abattoir : Driving There from Bre in the Morning"
- "Day Four : The Goat Abattoir : In the Beginning"
- "Day Four : The Goat Abattoir : The Killing Box"
- "Day Four : The Goat Abattoir : Moment of the Scream"
- "Day Four : The Goat Abattoir : As I Kept Walking"
- "Day Four : The Goat Abattoir : (Because Goats Scream Like Humans)"
- "Day Four : The Goat Abattoir : Kids Later to be Fattened Up"
- "Day Four : The Goat Abattoir : The Process of the Industry"
- "Day Four : The Goat Abattoir : Horses from Everywhere"
- "Day Four : The Goat Abattoir : The Decapitation of the Goats"
- "Day Four : The Goat Abattoir : The Queer Vegetation of Hope"
- "Day Four : The Goat Abattoir : Driving Home"
- "Day Four : The Goat Abattoir : An Ending"
- "Day Four : The Goat Abattoir : Crying at the Sliprails"
- "Day Four : The Goat Abattoir : Baby Animals in the Wilderness"
- "Day Four : The Goat Abattoir : 2 Words"
- "Day Five : Leaving Brewarrina"

== Critical reception ==
Reviewing the collection for Australian Book Review Bev Roberts called it "a drama, almost operatic in complexity and intensity." The review continued: "The poetry she's written about 'the broken land' is spare and direct, given force and authenticity by the plain, natural language through which despair, desolation and horror are made real and immediate."

== See also ==
- 1997 in Australian literature
