= The Lab (novel) =

Book by Jack Heath

- First edition cover
- Author: Jack Heath
- Language: English
- Genre: Science fiction
- Publisher: Pan Macmillan Australia
- Publication date: 1 April 2006
- Publication place: Australia
- Media type: Print (Hardcover)
- Pages: 324 pp
- ISBN: 978-0-33042-231-4
- Followed by: Remote Control

The Lab is a 2006 young adult science fiction action novel by Australian writer Jack Heath, originally published in Australia by Pan Macmillan. This was the author's debut novel and the first in the Six of Hearts series. The other books in the series are Remote Control (2007), Third Transmission (2009) and Dead Man Running (2012).

== Plot summary ==
The Lab is an action book, whose protagonist is a 16-year-old superhuman named Agent "Six of Hearts". Six was created to be the ultimate soldier by a group called The Lab which is a ruthless division of the company ChaoSonic.

In this futuristic setting there is only one known city left in the world, and it is run by ChaoSonic. ChaoSonic took over the city and has obliterated all their competitors and enemies. Six is an agent of a vigilante organization called "The Deck" which survives by attacking ChaoSonic subsidiaries that are acting unethically, arresting the people involved and then selling off their assets.

Only the King of Hearts, who saved Six from the Lab as a child, and is now his boss, is aware of the fact that Six is a superhuman developed by ChaoSonic. Six and King keep this a secret, as the Spades, another division of the Deck, would imprison Six if they knew he was a ChaoSonic creation, in case he was a threat. Six is the best agent in the Deck, having a 100% mission success rate.

The Deck then begins to investigate "The Lab" and King gives Six the assignment to stop anyone from discovering his true identity. On his mission he meets Kyntak. Kyntak is genetically identical to Six, and was designed in the Lab's 'Project Falcon' alongside him. In a twisted way, they are brothers. This discovery prompts Six to reexamine his life and reevaluate his own identity.

== Agent Six of Hearts ==
Six
- Six of Hearts character
- First appearance: The Lab
- Last appearance: Third Transmission
- Created by: Jack Heath (writer)
- Portrayed by: Tom Heath

In-universe information
- Aliases: Scott Macintyre, Steve, Ali Fińon Thaln
- Gender: Male
- Title: Agent Six of Hearts
- Occupation: Agent for The Deck
- Family: Agent King of Hearts (surrogate father/boss), Kyntak (brother/clone)

Six of Hearts is a fictional character created by Australian author Jack Heath. Six is the protagonist in the Six of Hearts series published by Pan Macmillan (in Australian and New Zealand) and by Scholastic in the US and Canada.

=== Life ===
Agent Six of Hearts was created by designer DNA and 'born' in The Lab, a division of Chaosonic, along with his two clones Kyntak and Sevadonn. During a fire which destroyed The Lab, Six escaped and was found by King who subsequently raised him. At the age of thirteen Six began working for The Deck; a law enforcement organisation founded by King of Hearts.

=== Talents ===
Being created from designer DNA and hence 'superhuman'; Six is able to run faster (up to 50 kilometres per hour), jump higher and is stronger than any of the other agents at The Deck. Six is also resourceful; being able to make an electromagnet from two magnetic bolts and a taser. He has also proved to be a good mechanic; creating his own motorcycle from the best parts available and being able to hotwire a car in less than 13 seconds. Six is so skilled that he is able to incapacitate his enemies without killing them and still complete the mission; as a result the other agents admire him.

=== Physical appearance ===
Six is described as having black hair, blue eyes, sharp profile, white teeth, thin fingers and pale skin. At 178 centimeters he is said to be the shortest agent in the Hearts department; however, Queen of Hearts is in fact shorter at just over 170 centimeters. Six wears a black coat and is 16 years old at the beginning of The Lab and throughout the series so far. Six also wears a pair of dogtags, a reminder of his vow to never take a human life again.

=== Deaths ===
Six, throughout the series, has 'died' on three separate occasions; once in The Lab and twice in Third Transmission.

After falling from a great height onto concrete in the events of The Lab, Six is said to have died, or most of him. However, a clone of him is grown and used as an organ donor to save him.

In Third Transmission, Six dies as part of the process to send him back in time. However, he will have no memory of it. Also, in the final chapter of Third Transmission titled Transmission Ends, Six dies after being shot, though critics speculate that this may not have actually happened due to a grammatical tense change.

== Development ==
Jack Heath started writing The Lab when he was 14 and attending Lyneham High School. Heath started writing The Lab to impress a girl at school who liked reading. He finished the first draft at the age of 17.

== Publication history ==
The Lab was released on 1 April 2006, and was published by Pan Macmillan Australia. It was published in the US by Scholastic Corporation on 1 November 2008.

== Critical reception ==
The Lab received mostly favourable reviews at the time of its release. The Bulletin said "Heath balances the flashy fight scenes with enough introspection to please both lovers of action and fans of character development" and Booklist magazine praised the plot as having "surprisingly well-oiled wheels within wheels."

io9 critic Charlie Jane Anders disagreed. "There's almost no character development in The Lab," she said. But she conceded that the book was "a really fun read, and ideal for kids who aren't particularly interested in introspective coming-of-age stories . . . It's basically an action movie on paper, but it could be a nice gateway drug to reading more serious science fiction."
