= Gig Ryan =

Australian poet

- Born: Elizabeth Anne Martina Ryan; 5 November 1956 (age 69); Leicester, England
- Education: La Trobe University (B.A.); University of Sydney; University of Melbourne; Monash University (Ph.D.)
- Occupations: Poet; Critic
- Relatives: Peter John Ryan (father)
- Writing career
- Notable work: Selected Poems (2012)

Gig Ryan, born Elizabeth Anne Martina Ryan, is an Australian poet. She is a recipient of the Christopher Brennan Award.

== Early life ==
Ryan was born in Leicester, England in 1956. This was when her father, Australian surgeon Peter John Ryan, had taken the family to England to gain his surgical qualifications (FRCS). After they returned in 1957, Ryan grew up in Melbourne, and was educated in the Catholic school system.

In 1993, Ryan earned a B.A. in Latin and Ancient Greek, and in 2020, she earned her doctorate in Creative writing at Monash University.

== Career ==
At seventeen, Ryan won the Victorian 1974 Maryborough Prize, and published her first poems. Ryan lived in Sydney 1978–1990. Before moving to Sydney, she had co-founded Melbourne women writers' magazine Luna in 1974, which she co-edited and reviewed for until '78. Ryan later became poetry editor of The Age newspaper (1998–2016). selecting a weekly poem, and regularly reviewing contemporary poetry. She has also recorded her songs with the bands 'Disband' (1981-1982: Kathy Bluff, violin, backing vocals; Amanda Jones, saxophone; Elizabeth Drake, piano, keyboards; 1983-1988, Amanda Jones, saxophone, backing vocals; Jo/Joanna Packer, drums, percussion; 1986-1988 joined by Thomas Tallis/ Ashelford, bass, backing vocals; Simon Alcorn, violin) and 'Driving Past'(David Nichols, drums; Mia Schoen, guitar and backing vocals; Andrew Withycombe, bass).

== Awards and recognition ==
- 1981 Anne Elder Award, co-winner for The Division of Anger
- 1999 Victorian Premier's Prize for Poetry, winner for Pure and Applied
- 2002 Kenneth Slessor Prize for Poetry, shortlisted for Heroic Money
- 2012 Kenneth Slessor Prize for Poetry, winner for New and Selected Poems
- 2012 ALS Gold Medal, shortlisted for New and Selected Poems
- 2012 Prime Minister's Literary Award for Poetry, shortlisted for New and Selected Poems
- 2015 Christopher Brennan Award

== Bibliography ==
- The Division of Anger (Transit Press, 1981) ISBN 9780959437713
- Manners of an Astronaut (Hale and Iremonger, 1984) ISBN 9780868060910
  - Revision: Manners of an Astronaut (Shearsman Library, 2018) ISBN 9781848615885
- The Last Interior (Scripsi Magazine, 1986) ISBN 9780959203714
- Excavation (PanPicador Australia, 1990) ISBN 9780330271936
- Pure and Applied (Paper Bark Press / Craftsman House, 1998) ISBN 9780958648264
- Research (Folio/Salt, 1999)
- Heroic Money (Brandl & Schlesinger, 2001) ISBN 9781876040338
- New and Selected Poems (Giramondo, 2011) ISBN 9781920882662
  - Revision: Selected Poems (Bloodaxe Books, UK, 2012) ISBN 9781852249212

== Discography ==
- "Six Goodbyes" Disband, Big Home Productions (1988)
- "Church Fete" Driving Past, Chapter Music (1998)
- "Real Estate" Driving Past, Chapter Music (1999)
- "Travel" Driving Past, Jacana Records (2006)

=== Selected list of poems ===
Title	Year	First published	Reprinted/collected in
"If I Had a Gun"	1980		The Division of Anger : Poems, Transit Poetry, 1980, pp. 51-52
