= Pure and Applied =

1998 Australian poetry collection by Gig Ryan

- Author: Gig Ryan
- Language: English
- Genre: Poetry collection
- Publisher: Paper Bark Press
- Publication date: 1998
- Publication place: Australia
- Media type: Print
- Pages: 91 pp
- Awards: 1999 Victorian Premier's Prize for Poetry, winner
- ISBN: 0958648263

Pure and Applied is a collection of poems by Australian poet Gig Ryan, published by Paper Bark Press in 1998.

The collection contains 65 poems, many previously published in various Australian literary magazines, and some published here for the first time.

It was the winner of the 1999 Victorian Premier's Prize for Poetry.

== Contents ==
- "Pure and Applied"
- "White Night"
- "Autumn"
- "And Let This Conglomeration Go"
- "One Hundred Flowers"
- "At the Laundromat"
- "London Saver"
- "Tresspass"
- "Two Winters"
- "Still Life"
- "Voyage"
- "Forfeit"
- "Fog (One)"
- "Impressario"
- "Memoir"
- "Compass and Map"
- "Transfer Fee"
- "New Corral (August 1992)"
- "Last Class"
- "His Desert Bequest"
- "3-Track"
- "Annals of the Field"
- "On Flight"
- "Alba"
- "Trade"
- "Rostra"
- "Forum"
- "Sunset"
- "Travellers from the New World"
- "Venerdi Santo"
- "Amaro E Dolce"
- "Present Mist"
- "The Birth of Rome"
- "Traffic"
- "Ruin Among the Lovers"
- "Sickness and Health"
- "Interest Rates"
- "Hay Fever"
- "Marriages"
- "Eating Vietnamese"
- "The Hands that Burned"
- "Strategies"
- "Achilleus to Odysseus"
- "Petronius Arbiter in '97"
- "After Sappho"
- "Night and Day"
- "He Extrapolates"
- "Green Target"
- "Electra to Orestes"
- "Who Praise You"
- "Poem"
- "Not Ecstasy, but Anxiety"
- "Advent"
- "Fog (2)"
- "Winter"
- "Real Estates"
- "His Previous Life"
- "Winged Victory"
- "Like the Book of the Statue"
- "In Perpetuity"
- "Summer"
- "Laboratory (Five Scenes)"
- "When I Consider"
- "Research"
- "Exchange Rates"

== Critical reception ==
In a review of the collection in The Sydney Morning Herald Don Anderson noted that the poems are "sited in the urban antipodes" while still being "concerned with the Old World, with the burden of Culture and History, with Tourism."

David McCooey in The Age concluded that "Ryan is immensely sensitive to the background radiation of personal and cultural lives; their decay and energy. When not clouded over, these poems occupy you, even if you don't always want to occupy them."

== See also ==
- 1998 in Australian literature
