= The Auschwitz Poems =

1986 Australian poetry collection by Lily Brett

- Author: Lily Brett
- Language: English
- Genre: Poetry collection
- Publisher: Scribe
- Publication date: 1986
- Publication place: Australia
- Media type: Print
- Pages: 139 pp
- Awards: 1987 Victorian Premier's Prize for Poetry, winner
- ISBN: 0908011105

The Auschwitz Poems is a collection of poems by Australian poet Lily Brett, published by Scribe in 1986.

The collection contains 59 poems from a number of literary publications, such as Overland, with many published here for the first time. The volume also contains a number of illustrations by the poet's artist husband David Rankin.

It was the winner of the 1987 Victorian Premier's Prize for Poetry.

== Contents ==
- "To the Left"
- "Children I"
- "Children II"
- "The Life"
- "Invisible"
- "Sleep"
- "Soup"
- "Possessions"
- "After a Year"
- "Sport"
- "Their Bodies"
- "Musselmanner (Moslems)"
- "Conjuring"
- "Another Selection"
- "Breasts"
- "Selection"
- "No Flies"
- "Arbeit Macht Frei (Freedom Through Work)"
- "Body Count "
- "An Image"
- "The Toilet"
- "Possessions of the Rich"
- "Hot Soup"
- "Marilla"
- "Canada"
- "What Was Left"
- "The Market"
- "Trading"
- "Renya's Baby"
- "The Sonderkommando"
- "The First Job"
- "The Guarantee"
- "Overload"
- "Someone"
- "The Hospital"
- "In the End"
- "The Last Day"
- "Buna (Auschwitz III)"
- "A Graduate"
- "The Vistula"
- "My Grandmother"
- "Marketing"
- "Hanka"
- "We Watch"
- "The D.P. Camp"
- "Arriving in Australia"
- "Three Days Later"
- "Our House"
- "Linen Sheets"
- "Everything Looked Normal"
- "In the Kitchen"
- "An Ordinary Meal"
- "For Breakfast"
- "Dinner"
- "Father"
- "By Yourself"
- "Rooshka's Dream"
- "I Wear Your Face"
- "Even the Sea"

== Critical reception ==
Reviewing the collection for The Sydney Morning Herald newspaper Judith Rodriguez noted that these poems are based on life in the Auschwitz concentration camp as revealed by the poet's parents. She continued: "Though this is territory often traversed, it is done with a personal intensity that ravels statements out into threads of poems".

== Notes ==
Soon after the book's publication the poet was interviewed by Anna Murdoch for The Age newspaper.

== See also ==
- 1986 in Australian literature
