= Seasonal Adjustments =

1994 novel by Australian/Bangladeshi author Adib Khan

- Author: Adib Khan
- Language: English
- Genre: Literary novel
- Publisher: Allen & Unwin
- Publication date: 1994
- Publication place: Australia
- Media type: Print
- Pages: 297 pp.
- Awards: 1994 New South Wales Premier's Literary Awards — Christina Stead Prize for Fiction, winner; 1995 Commonwealth Writers' Prize Best First Book — South East Asia and South Pacific Region
- ISBN: 1863736522

Seasonal Adjustments is a 1994 novel by the Australian/Bangladeshi author Adib Khan, originally published by Allen & Unwin.

It was the winner of the 1994 New South Wales Premier's Literary Awards, Christina Stead Prize for Fiction, and won the Commonwealth Writers' Prize for Best First Book in the South East Asia and South Pacific Region in 1995.

== Synopsis ==
Eighteen years before the start of this novel Iqbal Chaudhary left his home in Bangladesh for Australia during the Pakistani Civil War. Now he has returned home for the first time with his daughter. However, he has just separated from his wife and he finds himself between two cultures, seemingly unable to adapt to either.

== Critical reception ==
A reviewer in Publishers Weekly noted: "Kahn's imagery transcends culture, sex and faith, pulling readers into the heart of a character who is an alien in both his native land and his adopted country."

Kate Veitch, writing in The Sydney Morning Herald called the book a strong novel that explores "the most inaccessible crannies of the migrant's life, an experience central to this nation's understanding of itself."

== Awards ==
- 1994 New South Wales Premier's Literary Awards – Christina Stead Prize for Fiction, winner
- 1994 Age Book of the Year Award, shortlisted
- 1995 Commonwealth Writers' Prize for Best First Book in the South East Asia and South Pacific Region

== See also ==
- 1994 in Australian literature

== Notes ==
- Dedication: For Shahrukh, Aneeqa and Afsana.
