= Afterimages (poetry collection) =

1993 poetry collection by Robert Gray

- Author: Robert Gray
- Language: English
- Genre: Poetry collection
- Publisher: Duffy and Snellgrove
- Publication date: 2002
- Publication place: Australia
- Media type: Print
- Pages: 76 pp.
- Awards: 2002 Victorian Premier's Literary Award – C. J. Dennis Prize for Poetry, winner
- ISBN: 1876631228

Afterimages is a collection of poems by Australian poet Robert Gray, published by Duffy and Snellgrove in Australia in 2002.

The collection contains 25 poems from a variety of sources, with some published here for the first time.

The collection won the 2002 Victorian Premier's Literary Award – C. J. Dennis Prize for Poetry, and the 2002 The Age Book of the Year Awards – Dinny O'Hearn Poetry Prize.

== Contents ==
- "Gardenias"
- "Summer, Summer"
- "A Poem of Not More Than Forty Lines on the Subject of Nature"
- "A Country Churchyard"
- "Visiting in Fife"
- "Chameleon"
- "Vacancies"
- "The Dying Light"
- "Thomas Hardy"
- "The Street"
- "In the Mallee"
- "Damp Evening"
- "14 Poems [(Short Poems)]"
- "Days of '71"
- "Cyclone"
- "Xanadu in Argyll"
- "Flemington Races"
- "A Bowl of Pears"
- "The Drift of Things"
- "Homage to the Painters"
- "Headland"
- "The Fishermen"
- "In Dappled..."
- "Shack and Pine Tree"
- "Home Run"

== Critical reception ==
Writing in Australian Book Review Martin Duwell noted a particular theme in the collection: "the unavoidable recurrent image in Afterimages is that of rain. It is a book where rain can appear as a cyclonic rage against an ugly mercantilism ("Cyclone") or as the setting for a guilt-ridden, pre-dawn meditation ("Chameleon"). It seems that rain symbolises the downward drift of things, not towards entropy – because everything is continuously recombined – but towards death.

Steve Evans, in Text magazine, wasn't completely convinced by the collection: Afterimages presents a poet stil critically concerned with the imtertwining of the physical and the spiritual...there is plenty of material in Afterimages to gratify both existing fans and those recently discovering Robert Gray's poetry."

== Awards ==
- 2002 The Age Book of the Year Awards – Dinny O'Hearn Poetry Prize, winner
- 2002 Victorian Premier's Literary Award – C. J. Dennis Prize for Poetry, winner
- 2003 NSW Premier's Literary Award – Kenneth Slessor Prize for Poetry, shortlisted

== See also ==
- 2002 in Australian literature
