= In the Human Night =

1995 Australian poetry collection by Peter Bakowski

- Author: Peter Bakowski
- Language: English
- Genre: Poetry collection
- Publisher: Hale and Iremonger
- Publication date: 1995
- Publication place: Australia
- Media type: Print
- Pages: 72 pp
- Awards: 1996 Victorian Premier's Prize for Poetry, winner
- ISBN: 0868065390

In the Human Night is a collection of poems by Australian poet Peter Bakowski, published by Hale and Iremonger in 1995.

The collection contains 37 poems, from a variety of sources.

It was the winner of the 1996 Victorian Premier's Prize for Poetry.

== Contents ==
- "Fire, Fire, in the Mouth of Many Things"
- "Nights of Snakes and Angels"
- "Postcard from a Richmond Summer"
- "The Painting and the Girl"
- "The Spanish Understand"
- "For Hart Crane"
- "Suicide"
- "The Patience of a Bowl of Water"
- "Moon"
- "Bee"
- "Snail"
- "War and Journey"
- "Self-Portrait in East Melbourne Flat, 22 June 1994"
- "Self-Portrait in Richmond Studio, 25 October 1994"
- "A Small Hotel in Cairo (Self-Portrait, March 1986)"
- "In the Human Night"
- "Surgery"
- "The Dictionary Is Just a Beautiful Menu"
- "One for Charles Bukowski"
- "Broken on the Wheel of Los Angeles"
- "A Painting of West Berlin, 1989"
- "Billie and the Awkward Angel..."
- "The Dwarf with the Beautiful Head and Other Dreams..."
- "The Jaws of Factory (Graveyard Shift)"
- "Somewhere, a Choir"
- "A Letter to the General"
- "What Is a Man? (for Primo Levi)"
- "Eastern European Song (for Jacques Presser)"
- "Cliffhaven Mental Hospital, 1949 (for Janet Frame)"
- "Conversation in the Gentlemen's Club"
- "Night Walk, Richmond to St Kilda, 1987"
- "The Sailor of Grey Street"
- "The Serial Killer"
- "Rooms to Let, Fitzroy Street, St Kilda"
- "Kingdoms of Ink"
- "Counsel"
- "They've Given Us"

== Critical reception ==
Reviewing the volume for The Sydney Morning Herald Alan Wearne called it "an original and substantial collection." He noted that it "has a somewhat surreal urban landscape for its predominant background."

In The Canberra Times reviewer S. K. Kelen found "a European feel to the book where lightness of touch balances the gravity of the subject matter."

== See also ==
- 1995 in Australian literature
