= Morris Lurie =

Australian writer

- Born: Moses Lurie; 30 October 1938; Carlton, Victoria, Australia
- Died: 8 October 2014 (aged 75); Wantirna, Victoria, Australia
- Education: Royal Melbourne Institute of Technology
- Spouse: Helen Taylor
- Writing career
- Language: English
- Period: 1966–2014
- Notable awards: Patrick White Award (2006)

Moses "Morris" Lurie (30 October 1938 – 8 October 2014) was an Australian writer of comic novels, short stories, essays, plays, and children's books. His work focused on the comic mishaps of Jewish-Australian men (often writers) of Lurie's generation, who are invariably jazz fans.

== Biography ==
Lurie was born Moses Lurie in 1938 to Arie and Esther Lurie (Jewish emigrants from Poland) at the Royal Women's Hospital in Carlton, a suburb of Melbourne. He was named after an uncle who had died in Poland. He was schooled at Elwood Central School, Prahran Technical School and Melbourne High School, and then studied architecture at the Royal Melbourne Institute of Technology before working in advertising.

His first novel was the comic Rappaport (Hodder and Stoughton, 1966) and focused on a day in the life of a young Melbourne antique dealer and his immature friend, Friedlander. The characters, transplanted to London, were further chronicled in Rappaport's Revenge (1973). Lurie's self-exile from Australia to Europe, the UK and Northern Africa provides much of the material for his fiction. His second novel was The London Jungle Adventures of Charlie Hope (Hodder and Stoughton, 1968). Flying Home (1978) was named by the National Book Council as one of the ten best Australian books of the decade. Subsequent novels are Seven Books for Grossman (1983)—really a novella parodying the styles of various authors—and Madness (1991), about a writer dealing with a mentally unstable girlfriend.

Lurie is best known for his short stories. In 2000, he wrote an instructional guide When and How to Write Short Stories and What They Are. His stories have been published in many prestigious magazines, including The New Yorker, The Virginia Quarterly, Punch, The Times, The Telegraph Magazine, Transatlantic Review, Island, Meanjin, Overland, Quadrant and Westerly.

In his 2008 novel, To Light Attained, Lurie deals with the subject of suicide. His daughter Rachel had died by suicide in 1993, aged 23.A review of the novel described it as "a father's anguish in words".

Lurie succumbed to cancer on 8 October 2014, at the Wantirna Hospice in Melbourne's eastern suburbs.

== Awards ==
- 1973 – FAW State of Victoria Short Story Award: winner for 'Skylight in Lausanne'
- 1978 – National Book Council Award for Australian Literature: highly commended for 'Flying Home : a novel'
- 1983 – Children's Book Council of Australia Book of the Year Award: commended for 'Toby's Millions'
- 1985 – National Book Council Award for Australian Literature, 1985: joint second for 'The Night We Ate the Sparrow : A Memoir and Fourteen Stories'
- 1986 winner of the inaugural Young Australian's Best Book Award for 'The 27th Annual Hippopotamus Race'
- 1988 – NBC Banjo Awards: second for 'Whole Life : An Autobiography'
- 1991 – KOALA, Primary Readers: winner for 'The Twenty-Seventh Annual African Hippopotamus Race '
- 1994 – Island-North Essay Competition: runner-up for The Fat Kid's Revenge
- 1994 – Ulitarra-Sheaffer Pen Short Story Competition: winner for 'Towards a New Definition of Radical Feminism'
- 2006 – Patrick White Award for under-recognised, lifetime achievement in literature

== Works ==
Novels and short story collections

- Rappaport (Hodder and Stoughton, 1966)
- The London Jungle Adventures of Charlie Hope (Hodder and Stoughton, 1968)
- Happy Times (Hodder and Stoughton, 1969)
- Rappaport's Revenge (Angus & Robertson, 1973)
- Home is (1974)
- Inside the Wardrobe (Outback Press, 1975)
- Flying Home (Outback Press, 1978)
- Running Nicely (Thomas Nelson, 1979)
- Dirty Friends (Penguin Books, 1981)
- Seven Books for Grossman (Penguin Books, 1983)
- Outrageous Behaviour (a collection of best stories, Penguin Books, 1984)
- The Night We Ate the Sparrow (McPhee Gribble, 1985)
- Two Brothers, Running (Penguin Books, 1990)
- Madness (Angus & Robertson, 1991)
- The String (McPhee Gribble, 1995)
- Welcome to Tangier (Penguin Books, 1997)
- The Secret Strength of Children (Bruce Sims Books, 2001)
- Seventeen Versions of Jewishness: Twenty Examples (Common Ground, 2001)
- To Light Attained (Hybrid Publishers, 2008)
- Hergesheimer Hangs In (Arcadia/Australian Scholarly, 2011)
- Hergesheimer in the Present Tense (Hybrid Publishers, 2014)

Essays and journalism

- The English in Heat (Angus & Robertson, 1972)
- Hack Work (Outback Press, 1977)
- Public Secrets (1981)
- Snow Jobs (1985)
- My Life as a Movie (1988)

Other books include a collection of plays called Waterman (1979); an autobiography Whole Life (1987); and a number of children's books, including the popular Twenty-Seventh Annual African Hippopotamus Race (1969), which schoolchildren in Victoria voted their favourite young storybook by an Australian author.
