= Noel Rowe =

Australian poet

Noel Rowe (20 June 1951 – 11 July 2007) was a poet who lived in Sydney, Australia, and was senior lecturer in Australian Literature at the University of Sydney where he was also awarded the University Medal (1984) and doctorate (1989). Before becoming an academic, Rowe was a Roman Catholic priest in the Marist Order.

Rowe was born in Macksville in northern New South Wales on 20 June 1951. In the 1960s and 1970s he was both a student and teacher at St John's College, Woodlawn, Lismore.

His books include Perhaps, After All (Vagabond, 2000), Next to Nothing (Vagabond Stray Dog, 2004) and Touching the Hem (Vagabond, 2006). He was co-editor of the literary journal Southerly with David Brooks from 1999 to 2007. He also, with Vivian Smith, edited Windchimes: Asia in Australian Poetry (Pandanus Books, 2006). In 2005, Rowe was awarded the William Baylebridge Memorial Prize for poetry. He was also invited to read his poetry at International Festivals in Rotterdam (2005) and Jerusalem (2006). He had particular interest in the interrelationship between literature, theology and ethics.

Rowe died on 11 July 2007, after being ill for two years.

In 2015 the Noel Rowe Poetry Award was set up by Vagabond Press to be presented every two years for an unpublished manuscript by an emerging poet.
