= The Nightmarkets =

1986 verse novel by Australian writer Alan Wearne

- Author: Alan Wearne
- Language: English
- Genre: Fiction
- Publisher: Penguin
- Publication date: 1986
- Publication place: Australia
- Media type: Print
- Pages: 291 pp.
- Awards: ALS Gold Medal winner 1987
- ISBN: 0140075860
- Preceded by: New Devil, New Parish
- Followed by: Out Here

The Nightmarkets (1986) is a verse novel by Australian writer Alan Wearne. It was originally published by Penguin in Australia in 1986.

Each of the ten sections of the novel was previously published as a separate poem in such publications as Scripsi, Meanjin, and The Oxford Book of Modern Australian Verse etc.

== Synopsis ==
The novel follows a number of different characters, including: journalist Ian Metcalfe; his ex-girlfriend Sue Dobson; his brother Robert Metcalfe; and sex worker Terri. The characters tell their own stories in a series of monologues covering the geography of Melbourne from inner-city Fitzroy to suburban Heidelberg, and Australian history from the Vietnam War, through the Whitlam Government's election and sacking up to the 1980s.

== Publishing history ==
After its initial publication in Australia by Penguin in 1986, the novel was reprinted by Penguin Books in 1987.

== Critical reception ==
Writing in The Canberra Times Stephanie Green noted that the book "is an extraordinary blend of convention and originality, written as a sequence of verse narratives set in the high and the low life of contemporary Melbourne, taking in the political combat zones, the urban fringe and middle-class suburbia. The ten sections of the book are voiced by a group of central characters, mostly faded icons from the post-'60s generation; intellectuals jilted by the demise of the Whitlam era in 1975...It is almost classical in shape and proportion, in its diversity and profusion, and in the scope of its exploration of social life. It is certainly ambitious. Yet, the various colourful threads that make up this enigmatic novel are woven together through the fabric of the writing in an energetic and unusual way...The Nightmarkets is intriguing and lively, packed with characters, places, public and private events. Its narrative verse style and its intentions make it an unusual and ambitious work. It is also clever, amusing and in many ways highly relevant."

== Awards ==
- ALS Gold Medal winner 1987

== See also ==
- 1986 in Australian literature
