= Tide Country =

1982 poetry collection by Vivian Smith

- Author: Vivian Smith
- Language: English
- Genre: Poetry collection
- Publisher: Angus and Robertson
- Publication date: 1982
- Publication place: Australia
- Media type: Print
- Pages: 93 pp.
- Awards: 1982 Grace Leven Prize for Poetry winner
- ISBN: 0207144915

Tide Country is a collection of poems by Australian poet Vivian Smith, published by Angus and Robertson in 1982.

The collection contains 84 poems taken from a variety of publications such as The Australian newspaper, The Bulletin, Meanjin, Overland, Southerly, and others.

== Contents ==
- "Bedlam Hills"
- "Bird Sanctuary"
- "The Shadow"
- "In Summer Rain"
- "Summer Band Concert"
- "Fishermen, Winter"
- "Thylacine"
- "Deserted Bandstand, Kingston Beach"
- "Alceste's Resolution (Alceste (to Gwen Harwood))"
- "Old Men are Facts : The Ship's Graveyard, Risdon, Tasmania"
- "Despite the Room"
- "Water-Beetles"
- "Winter"
- "For My Daughter"
- "Myth"
- "The Last Summer"
- "Fishermen, Drowned Beyond the West Coast"
- "Late Autumn Dove"
- "The Other Meaning"
- "Advice (One Season)"
- "Wrong Turning"
- "Philoctetes (Philoctetes (In a Private Hotel))"
- "Family Album"
- "Quiet Evening"
- "Deathbed Sketch (for an Unnamed Portrait, Signed)"
- "Bus Ride"
- "An Effect of Light"
- "Dialogue with a Contemporary"
- "There is No Sleight of Hand"
- "Early Arrival: Sydney"
- "Summer Sketches: Sydney"
- "Return to Hobart"
- "For a New Year"
- "Late April: Hobart"
- "Warmth in July : Hobart"
- "Crows in Winter"
- "At an Exhibition of Historical Paintings, Hobart"
- "Reflections"
- "Balmoral Summer '66"
- "View from the Domain, Hobart"
- "A Room in Mosman"
- "Postcard from the Subtropics (Postcard from the Sub-Tropics)"
- "Summer Notes"
- "Lines for Rosamond McCulloch"
- "For Edith Holmes: Tasmanian Painter"
- "A Few Words for Maxi"
- "For Nan Chauncy : 1900-1970"
- "Coins and Bricks"
- "Onion in a Jar"
- "Three Landscapes : Slope with Boulders"
- "The Man Fern Near the Bus Stop"
- "Back in Hobart"
- "Il Convento, Batignano (for Robert Brain)"
- "Twenty Years of Sydney"
- "The Traveller Returns"
- "My Morning Dip"
- "The Edge of Winter"
- "Still Life"
- "Three Landscapes : The Restorers"
- "Revisiting"
- "The Tower : Muzot"
- "Late May : Sydney"
- "Looking Back"
- "Dung Beetles"
- "Tasmania"
- "Autumn Reading"
- "Convolvulus"
- "At the Parrot House, Taronga Park"
- "From Korea"
- "Delie, Obiect de Plvs Havlte Vertu (1544) (after Maurice Sceve)"
- "Variations on Garnier's Perpetuum Mobile"
- "Summer Feeling (after Britting)"
- "Under the Pine (after Peter Huchel)"
- "House for Sale (after Andre Frenaud)"
- "Corona (Poems After Paul Celan : Corona)"
- "Poems After Paul Celan : Flower"
- "Poems After Paul Celan : In Praise of Distance"
- "Poems After Paul Celan : Menhir"
- "Poems After Paul Celan : With Changing Key"
- "Poems After Paul Celan : Ich Bin Allein"
- "Poems After Paul Celan : The Whitest Dove of All"
- "Poems After Paul Celan : Sleep Then"
- "Poems After Paul Celan : Sleep and Food"
- "Poems After Paul Celan : I Heard it Said"

== Critical reception ==
Writing in The Age reviewer Kerryn Goldsworthy found in a lot of the poems Smith stuck to a certain forms which "sometimes lets him down, either through ostentatious overcarefulness at the expense of fluency, or through the tendency to cliche".

In Australian Book Review Barbara Giles found that Smith writes "elegant, lyrical verse, carefully wrought and varied in content, in masterly fashion."

== See also ==
- 1982 in Australian literature

== Notes ==
- Dedication: For Sybille, Vanessa, Gabrielle and Nicholas

== Awards ==
- 1982 Grace Leven Prize for Poetry, winner
- 1983 New South Wales Premier's Literary Awards, winner
