= Peter Bakowski =

Australian poet

Peter Bakowski (born 15 October 1954) is an Australian poet. His poems often use deceptively simple words and images, reminiscent at times of words in a child's picture book, but with some stylistic similarities to the work of writers such as Charles Simic or Vítězslav Nezval.

== Biography ==
Born in Melbourne, to Polish-German immigrants. Bakowski was born premature, with a hole in the heart; he has survived two heart operations. His parents ran a delicatessen, and after completing his secondary schooling he worked in a series of low-paying jobs before opening his own record shop in the early 1980s.

He commenced writing poetry while travelling through Texas in 1983. His early works, including his first book Thunder Road, Thunder Heart (1988), show the influence of American Beat writers such as Jack Kerouac, Allen Ginsberg and Charles Bukowski. His poems have appeared in over one hundred literary magazines worldwide, predominantly in English but also in Arabic, Bahasa-Indonesian, Bengali, German, Japanese, Polish, Spanish, Mandarin and French. He has lived in Melbourne and London, and travelled widely throughout Australia, Europe, North America and Africa, occasionally as an artist-in-residence. In 2007 he became an artist in residence at the University of Macau. He has been writer-in-residence at the B.R. Whiting Library in Rome; the Cité Internationale des Arts in Paris; the University of Macau; Soochow University, Jiangsu Province, China; the Katherine Susannah Prichard Writers' Centre in Greenmount, Western Australia; the Hobart Writers' Cottage in Battery Point, Tasmania; the Arthur Boyd Estate of "Bundanon" near Nowra, New South Wales; the Broken Hill Poetry Festival, New South Wales.

His travels have provided a wide range of material for his work; his fifth collection Days That We Couldn’t Rehearse contains poems set in Paris, Transylvania, the Upper Volga, Uzbekistan and Sarajevo.

Raised a Catholic, in 1994 he married Helen Bourke, an Irish-Australian seamstress. Their child, Ophelia Bakowski is a DJ, performance artist and photographer.

Bakowski's book In The Human Night won the 1996 Victorian Premier's Award, the C. J. Dennis Prize for Poetry. In 2010 he was shortlisted for the same award, for his book Beneath Our Armour.

In 2015, a bilingual book (French and English) of selected poems was published in France. In June 2022, Peter Bakowski was Virtual Writer in Residence with the International Anthony Burgess Foundation via Manchester UNESCO City of Literature.

== Bibliography ==
- Thunder Road, Thunder Heart (Nosukumo Press, 1988)
- In the Human Night (Hale & Iremonger, 1995) ISBN 0-86806-539-0
- The Neon Hunger (Oel Press, 1996) ISBN 0-9680755-0-9
- The Heart at 3am (Hale & Iremonger, 1997) ISBN 0 86806 643 5
- Days That We Couldn’t Rehearse (Hale & Iremonger, 2002) ISBN 0 86806 710 5
- Beneath Our Armour (Hunter Publishers, 2009) ISBN 978-0-9805179-4-1
- Personal Weather (Hunter Publishers, 2014) ISBN 978-0-9875802-5-2
- Le cœur à trois heures du matin (Editions Bruno Doucey, 2015) ISBN 978-2-36229-079-4
- The Courage Season (Guillotine Press, 2017) ISBN 978-0-9953991-5-0
- The Elsewhere Variations (co-written with Ken Bolton) (Wakefield Press, 2019) ISBN 978-1-74305676 9
- Wardrobe of Selves (Recent Work Press, 2019) ISBN 9780648685302
- Nearly Lunch (co-written with Ken Bolton) (Wakefield Press, 2021) ISBN 978-1-74305859 6
- Our Ways on Earth (Recent Work Press, 2022) ISBN 978-0-645180879
- Waldo's Game (co-written with Ken Bolton) (Wakefield Press, 2023) ISBN 978-1-92304205 6}
- On Luck Street (co-written with Ken Bolton) (Wakefield Press, 2023) ISBN 978-1-92304204 9}
- Necessary Wonder (Hunter Publishers, 2025) ISBN 978-1-76350926 9

== Awards ==
- 1996 Victorian Premier's Literary Awards: C. J. Dennis Prize for Poetry
