= Peter John Ryan =

Peter John Ryan OAM FRCS FRACS (25 November 1925 – 3 June 2002) was a consultant surgeon at St Vincent's Hospital in Melbourne, Australia.

== Early life and education ==
Ryan was born in Dookie, Victoria in 1925, and attended Assumption College, Kilmore. He qualified in medicine at the University of Melbourne in 1948.

== Career ==
He led the first St Vincent's Hospital civilian surgical team to work in Long Xuyen, Vietnam, during the Vietnam War.

In September 1986 he delivered the Hunterian Oration on diverticular disease. In 1988, he published A Very Short Textbook of Surgery, and this was also translated into Indonesian and Mandarin. He also worked as an honorary consultant surgeon one morning per month for almost 20 years from 1981 at the VAHS (Victorian Aboriginal Health Service).

== Other roles ==
Another of his medical lifetime interests was road safety and driving. He was a founding member of the Royal Australasian College of Surgeons' Road Trauma Committee, which was partially responsible for the introduction of compulsory seat belts in cars in Victoria in 1970, the first state in the world to pass such a law (Seat belt legislation). In May 1965 Ryan supported a motion to investigate the causes of road accidents in Australia. Ryan was President of the International Society of University Colon and Rectal Surgeons (ISUCRS) from 1987 to 1988, and chaired the ISUCRS Congress in Melbourne in 1980.

== Recognition ==
In 1986 he was made Hunterian Professor of Surgery by the Royal College of Surgeons in London.

== Death and legacy ==
In 1996 the Peter Ryan Prize for Surgical Research for final year St Vincent's medical students was established in his honour.

He died from cancer on 3 June 2002.

== Bibliography ==
- A very short textbook of surgery, London: Chapman & Hall Medical, 1994. ISBN 0-412-61530-4
