= Washing the Money : Poems with Photographs =

1986 Australian poetry collection by Rhyll McMaster

- Author: Rhyll McMaster
- Language: English
- Genre: Poetry collection
- Publisher: Angus and Robertson
- Publication date: 1986
- Publication place: Australia
- Media type: Print
- Pages: 41 pp.
- Awards: 1986 Grace Leven Prize for Poetry, winner; 1986 Victorian Premier's Prize for Poetry, joint winner
- ISBN: 0207152810

Washing the Money : Poems with Photographs is a collection of poems by Australian poet Rhyll McMaster, published by Angus and Robertson in 1986.

The collection contains 30 poems from a variety of sources.

== Contents ==
- "Holmleigh"
- "Tile Table"
- "A Dream of Washed Hair"
- "A Pouch, a Fish, a Hoax"
- "Washing the Money"
- "Profiles of My Father"
- "Holiday House"
- "Beach Photograph"
- "Seven in the Morning"
- "Mutton Bird Man"
- "Picnics"
- "Eeling"
- "Lake Burley Griffin, Midwinter"
- "Hard Frost (for James Morgan)"
- "Sturt's Desert Pea"
- "Parrot in the Room"
- "The Starer"
- "Photograph - Interior of Truck (for Sally McInerney)"
- "Woman Crossing the Road"
- "Tropical"
- "Windows"
- "Back Steps Lookout"
- "Here's Death"
- "One for the Album"
- "Shoulder"
- "Approaching Sleep"
- "Vertebrae"
- "Clockface"
- "Life Begins"
- "Light"

== Critical reception ==
Writing in The Canberra Times, Peter Lugg noted that "McMaster exells as a portraitist" before going on to state that with this collection the poet "records the social history of any Brisbanite who grew up in the late '50s and after." However he concluded that "While the family portraits in the first part of the book are nostalgic and evocative, they only rarely contain that hint of mystery and complexity which is at the heart of the best poetry."

== Awards ==
- 1986 Grace Leven Prize for Poetry, winner
- 1986 Victorian Premier's Prize for Poetry, joint winner

== See also ==
- 1986 in Australian literature
