= Selected Poems 1963-1983 =

1985 poetry collection by Robert Gray

Selected Poems 1963–1983
- Author: Robert Gray
- Language: English
- Genre: Poetry collection
- Publisher: Angus and Robertson
- Publication date: 1985
- Publication place: Australia
- Media type: Print
- Pages: 155 pp.
- Awards: 1985 Grace Leven Prize for Poetry, winner; 1986 NSW Premier's Literary Award – Kenneth Slessor Prize for Poetry, winner
- ISBN: 0207152586

Selected Poems 1963–1983 is a collection of poems by Australian poet Robert Gray, published by Angus and Robertson in Australia in 1985.

The collection contains 99 poems from a variety of sources.

The collection won the 1986 NSW Premier's Literary Award – Kenneth Slessor Prize for Poetry.

== Contents ==
- "Journey : The North Coast"
- "Kangaroo"
- "The Hospital"
- "The Farm Woman Speaks"
- "Scattered Lights..."
- "Morning"
- "Salvation Army Hostel"
- "Back There"
- "On Climbing the Stone Gate Peak (Hsieh Ling-yun, AD 385-433)"
- "The Death of Ronald Ryan (February 3, 1967)"
- "Within the Traveller's Eye"
- "The Pine"
- "Boarding House Poems : 1"
- "Boarding House Poems : 2"
- "Boarding House Poems : 3"
- "Boarding House Poems : 4"
- "Boarding House Poems : 5"
- "Boarding House Poems : 6"
- "Boarding House Poems : 7"
- "Boarding House Poems : 8"
- "The Single Principle of Forms"
- "A Labourer"
- "Church Grounds"
- "[21 Poems] ([Short Poems])"
- "Credo"
- "The Meat Works"
- "Landscape"
- "The Cats"
- "To the Master Dogen Zenji (1200-1253 AD)"
- "Bright Day"
- "Evening"
- "[24 Poems]"
- "The Sawmill Shacks"
- "North Coast Town"
- "The Great Buddha, Kamakura"
- "Late Ferry"
- "The Name"
- "Old House"
- "Poem to Kristina"
- "In the Bus"
- "The Chair"
- "Greyhounds"
- "The Old Wooden Venetian Blinds..."
- "Poem to My Father"
- "Pumpkins"
- "Looking After a Friend's House"
- "Smoke of Logs ..."
- "Afterwards"
- "Tropical Morning"
- "The Visit"
- "Flames and Dangling Wire"
- "Old Man"
- "The Calm"
- "The Swallows"
- "[14 Poems]"
- "Dharma Vehicle"
- "Telling the Beads"
- "Brushtail Possum"
- "Bellingen"
- "Going Back, On a Hot Night"
- "[20 Poems] ([Short Poems])"
- "Reflection"
- "An Afternoon"
- "Scotland, Visitation"
- "The Dusk"
- "The Estates"
- "Dark Glasses"
- "In the Early Hours ..."
- "The Motel Room"
- "On Contradictions"
- "Walking in an American Wood"
- "Travels en Famille"
- "The Garden"
- "Smoke"
- "Daybreak"
- "The Canoe"
- "A Storm"
- "The Sea-Shell"
- "The Best Place..."
- "On Politics"
- "Bondi"
- "The Poem"
- "A Country Town"
- "Sketch of the Harbour"
- "Emptying the Desk"
- "[16 Poems] ([Short Poems])"
- "A Day at Bellingen"
- "Landscape"
- "Bringing the Cattle"
- "Karl Marx"
- "Watching By the Harbour"
- "Diptych"
- "Aubade"
- "Memories of the Coast"
- "For Harriet"
- "At the Inlet"
- "Mr Nelson"
- "Following the Wheel Tracks..."
- "Curriculum Vitae"

== Critical reception ==
Judith Rodruguez, in The Sydney Morning Herald, complimented the collection, calling it "the most refreshing selected for several years." She went on to note "Gray's reliance on the observed nature of things surely appeals to an Australian public. The prickliness of his concentration, his sensual revulsion from the gross insignia of poverty and snobbery and the processes of an abbatoir, all have us with him."

== Awards ==
- 1985 The Age Book of the Year Awards – Imaginative Writing, shortlisted
- 1985 Grace Leven Prize for Poetry, winner
- 1986 NSW Premier's Literary Award – Kenneth Slessor Prize for Poetry, winner

== See also ==
- 1985 in Australian literature
