= Alasdair Duncan =

Australian author and journalist

Alasdair Duncan (born 22 November 1982) is an Australian author and journalist, based in Brisbane. He wrote for the weekly music magazine Rave, where he published interviews with Cut Copy, LCD Soundsystem, M.I.A. and Soulwax, and is a currently a contributor to The Brag and Beat magazines.

Duncan is the author of the novel Sushi Central, which was published under the title Dance, Recover, Repeat in the U.S. by MTV Books. His second novel, Metro, was published in Australia in August 2006, and was released in the UK by Burning House Books in February 2008.

Since 2008, Duncan has been a member of the judging panel for the State Library of Queensland's Young Writers Award.

== Published works ==
- Duncan, Alasdair (2003), Sushi central, University of Queensland Press, ISBN 978-0-7022-3399-9
- Duncan, Alasdair (2005), Dance, Recover, Repeat, Pocket Books, ISBN 978-1-4165-0342-2
- Duncan, Alasdair (2006), Metro, University of Queensland Press, ISBN 978-0-7022-3553-5, OCLC 225207543
- Duncan, Alasdair; Queensland University of Technology. Creative Industries Faculty (2008), Who are the MySpace generation and how can they be represented in a work of fiction? (Thesis/dissertation), OCLC 367579487
