= Jack Heath =

Australian writer

- Born: 23 August 1986 (age 40); Canberra, Australian Capital Territory, Australia
- Education: Lyneham High School
- Occupations: Novelist; Short Story Writer
- Partner: Venetia Major
- Writing career
- Language: English
- Genres: Young Adult Fiction; Science Fiction; Crime Fiction; Thriller; Children's Fiction
- Website: jackheathwriter.com

Jack Heath is an Australian writer of fiction for children and adults who is best known for the Danger, Scream, Liars and Timothy Blake series. He has been shortlisted for the ACT Book of the Year Award, CBCA Notable Book Award, Nottinghamshire Brilliant Book Award, the Aurealis Sci-Fi book of the Year, the National Year of Reading "Our Story" Collection, a Young Australians Best Book Award, a Kids Own Australian Literature Award and the Australian of the Year Award. He lives in Gungahlin, Canberra.

== Genre and style ==
Heath's young adult novels are mysteries, characterised by the frequent juxtaposition of elaborate action set pieces and moral philosophy. They usually include science fiction technologies or settings, and are almost always set in an ambiguous location.

== As a public figure ==
Heath was featured in the Shanghai World Expo.

== Books ==
=== Stand-alone novels ===
- Ink, Inc. (Dec 2013)
- Replica (Aug 2014)
- Kill Your Brother (July 2021)
- Kill Your Husbands (Nov 2023)
- Doctor Who: Frankenstein and the Patchwork Man (April 2025)
- Kill Your Boss (Nov 2025)

=== The Liars series ===
Sources:

- The Truth App (1 Sep 2018)
- No Survivors (also published as The Missing Passenger, 1 Dec 2018)
- The Set Up (1 March 2019)
- Lockdown (1 June 2019)
- Armageddon (1 Sep 2019)

=== The Fero Files ===
- The Cut Out (Aug 2015) – a Children's Book Council of Australia notable book and shortlisted for the Aurealis Award for Best Children's Fiction Novel
- The Fail Safe (Sep 2016) - a Children's Book Council of Australia notable book, shortlisted for ACT Book of the Year

=== The Danger Series ===
- 300 Minutes Of Danger (Sep 2016) - a Children's Book Council of Australia notable book
- 400 Minutes Of Danger (Aug 2017)
- 500 Minutes Of Danger (Aug 2018)
- 200 Minutes Of Danger (Feb 2020)
- 10 Minutes Of Danger (July 2022)

=== Countdown to Danger/Choose Your Destiny ===
- Countdown to Danger: Bullet Train Disaster (Feb 2011)
- Countdown to Danger: Shock wave (May 2012)
- Countdown to Danger: Deadly Heist (Feb 2013)

=== The Scream Series ===
- Human Flytrap (May 2019)
- Spider Army (May 2019)
- Haunted Book (Aug 2019)
- Squid Slayer (Aug 2019)

=== Ashley Arthur series ===
- Money Run (2008) – shortlisted for the Nottinghamshire Brilliant Book Award
- Hit List (2010) – shortlisted for the National Year of Reading "Our Story" Collection, a YABBA and a KOALA

=== Six of Hearts series ===
- The Lab (2006)
- Remote Control (2007) – shortlisted for the Aurealis Award for Best Science-Fiction Novel
- Third Transmission (2009) – excerpt published in The Invisible Thread: One Hundred Years of Words
- Dead Man Running (2012)

=== Timothy Blake series ===
- Hangman (Jan 2018)
- Hunter (also published as Just One Bite, Mar 2019)
- Hideout (Dec 2020)
- Headcase (Nov 2022)

== Short stories ==
- Sleep (published in Voiceworks, issue #65), 2006
- The Mistress (published in Voiceworks, issue #68), 2007
- Right-angles and hair (published in The Sex Mook), 2007
- Emma (published in lip, issue #16), 2008
- 404 (published on jackheath.com.au), 2008
- Freak Show (published by the State Library of Queensland), 2008
- The Beach (written for Salon 3 – Stoker and Shelley, and published on Tara Moss's blog, The Book Post), 2009
- Method Living, 2010
- Flesh (written for Salon 5 – Pinol and Wells, and published on The Book Post), 2010
- The Caretakers, 2011
