= Robert Gray (poet) =

Australian poet (1945–2025)

- Born: 23 February 1945; Port Macquarie, New South Wales, Australia
- Died: 17 November 2025 (aged 80); Waverley, Sydney, New South Wales, Australia
- Occupations: Poet, freelance writer, critic
- Writing career
- Genre: Poetry
- Website: robertgraypoetry.com

Robert William Geoffrey Gray (23 February 1945 – 17 November 2025) was an Australian poet, freelance writer and critic. He was described as "an Imagist without a rival in the English-speaking world" and "one of the contemporary masters of poetry in English".

== Life and career ==
Gray was born in Port Macquarie, grew up in Coffs Harbour and was educated in a country town on the north coast of New South Wales. He trained there as a journalist, and then worked in Sydney after settling in the 1970s as an editor, advertising copywriter, reviewer and buyer for bookshops. His first book of poems, Creekwater Journal, was published in 1973.

As a poet, Gray was known as a very skilful imagist. He was most notable for his keen visual imagery and intensely observed landscapes. Les Murray said about Gray, "[he] has an eye, and the verbal felicity which must accompany such an eye. He can use an epithet and image to perfection and catch a whole world of sensory understanding in a word or a phrase." His wide reading in and experience of East Asian cultures and their varieties of Zen Buddhism is clear in many of the themes and forms he chose to work in, including, for example haiku-style free verse works, nature style poetry, as well as discursive and narrative style poems, such as "Diptych" (1984). Gray's essentially Australian response to nature was reinforced by what he saw as a commonsensical Eastern view of man as within nature rather than an agent removable from, and capable of controlling, nature. Martin Langford has written that Gray's poetry captures the Australian ambivalence towards their own landscapes. "No-one captures better that dual sense of our fascination with the physical world, and our dismay at its indifference."

Gray was a writer-in-residence at Meiji University in Tokyo and at several schools and universities throughout Australia including Geelong College in 1982. From February–March 2012, Gray lectured at Campion College in Western Sydney.

He won numerous awards including the Adelaide Arts Festival award and the New South Wales and Victorian Premiers' awards for poetry. In 1990 he received the Patrick White Award.

With Geoffrey Lehmann, he edited two anthologies, The Younger Australian Poets and Australian Poetry in the Twentieth Century, and he was the editor of Selected Poems by Shaw Neilson, and Drawn from Life, the journals of the painter John Olsen. His much-anticipated memoir, The Land I Came Through Last, was published in 2008.

In 2012 his collected poems were published under the title Cumulus. As with each of his poetic publications, it included all that Gray wished to preserve of his earlier poetry and many newer poems.

Gray died from complications of Parkinson's disease in Waverley, Sydney, on 17 November 2025, at the age of 80.

== Awards ==
- 1985 – Grace Leven Prize for Poetry for Selected Poems 1963-1983
- 1986 – New South Wales Premier's Literary Awards Kenneth Slessor Prize for Poetry for Selected Poems 1963–83
- 1986 – Adelaide Festival Awards for Literature for Selected Poems 1963–83
- 1990 – Patrick White Award
- 1994 – Victorian Premier's Literary Award – C. J. Dennis Prize for Poetry for Certain Things
- 2002 – The Age Book of the Year Awards – Dinny O'Hearn Poetry Prize for Afterimages
- 2002 – Victorian Premier's Literary Award – C. J. Dennis Prize for Poetry for Afterimages
- 2011 – Australia Council Writers' Emeritus
- 2012 – Philip Hodgins Memorial Prize

== Bibliography ==
=== Memoir ===
- The Land I Came Through Last (Giramond, 2008)

=== Collections ===
- Introspect, Retrospect: Poems (Lyre-Bird Writers, c.1970)
- Creekwater Journal (University of Queensland Press, 1974)
- Grass Script (Angus & Robertson, 1979)
- The Skylight (Angus & Robertson, 1984)
- Selected Poems 1963-1983 (Angus & Robertson, 1985)
- Piano (Angus & Robertson, 1988)
- Selected Poems (Angus & Robertson, 1990)
- Certain Things (William Heinemann Australia, 1993)
- Lineations (Duffy & Snellgrove, 1996)
- New Selected Poems (Duffy & Snellgrove, 1998)
- Afterimages (Duffy & Snellgrove, 2002)
- Nameless Earth (Carcanet, 2006)
- Cumulus: Collected Poems (John Leonard Press, 2012)

=== Edited ===
- The Younger Australian poets (Hale & Iremonger, c1983) with Geoffrey Lehmann
- Selected Poems / Roland Robinson (Angus & Robertson, 1989)
- Australian Poetry in the Twentieth Century edited by Geoffrey Lehmann, Heinemann, 1991
- Sydney's Poems: A Selection on the Occasion of the City's One Hundred and Fiftieth Anniversary 1842–1992 (Primavera Press, 1992) with Vivian Smith
- A Spill of Light, A Thrust of Shadow (Youngstreet Poets, 1999)
- Australian Poetry Since 1788 (University of New South Wales Press, 2011) with Geoffrey Lehmann
