= Certain Things =

1993 poetry collection by Robert Gray

- Author: Robert Gray
- Language: English
- Genre: Poetry collection
- Publisher: Heinemann
- Publication date: 1993
- Publication place: Australia
- Media type: Print
- Pages: 81 pp.
- Awards: 1994 Victorian Premier's Literary Award – C. J. Dennis Prize for Poetry, winner
- ISBN: 0855615060

Certain Things is a collection of poems by Australian poet Robert Gray, published by Heinemann in Australia in 1993.

The collection contains 37 poems from a variety of sources, with some published here for the first time.

The collection won the 1994 Victorian Premier's Literary Award – C. J. Dennis Prize for Poetry.

== Contents ==
- "Currawongs"
- "13th May (at Ted's)"
- "Harmonica"
- "The Pines"
- "Travelling"
- "The Girls"
- "(Traditional)"
- "Renga"
- "In Thin Air"
- "The Room"
- "A Testimony"
- "The West"
- "Wintry Evenings"
- "Descent"
- "Malthusian Island"
- "Landscape"
- "Doodling"
- "The White Roads"
- "Souvenir"
- "[Untitled] (from The Gift)"
- "Impromptus"
- "N.M.G."
- "On South Head"
- "Small Hours"
- "On a Forestry Trail"
- "The Life of a Chinese Poet"
- "Shard"
- "Outside (Going Outside)"
- "Arrivals and Departures"
- "Stanzas"
- "Today"
- "Illusions"
- "Dawn"
- "The South Coast, While Looking for a House"
- "In One Ear ..."
- "Afternoon Walk"
- "The Hawkesbury River"

== Critical reception ==
Kevin Hart, writing in The Age, noted that Gray was continuing his examination of his recent themes, meditating "on the contingencies of nature – of the self and nature as nothing other than contingencies." he also noted that in the poet's best poems "we sense, behind the melancholy and even behind the nobility of voice, a principled affirmation of existence."

== Awards ==
- 1994 Victorian Premier's Literary Award – C. J. Dennis Prize for Poetry, winner

== See also ==
- 1993 in Australian literature
