= Adib Khan =

Australian novelist

- Born: 1949 (age 76–77); Dhaka, Bangladesh
- Occupation: Novelist
- Writing career
- Notable awards: 1994 New South Wales Premier's Literary Awards – Fiction, winner; 1995 Commonwealth Writers' Prize for Best Book

Adib Khan is an Australian novelist of Bangladeshi origin. He moved to Australia in 1973 and obtained an MA from Monash University in 1976. He taught creative writing at Ballarat University, and in 2007 returned to Monash to pursue a PhD.

Khan started writing in his 40s and has published five novels. His first novel, Seasonal Adjustments won the Christina Stead Prize for Fiction, the Book of the Year award in the 1994 NSW Premier′s Literary Awards, and the 1995 Commonwealth Writers' Prize for Best Book, and was also shortlisted for the 1994 Age Book of the Year award. Solitude of Illusions was shortlisted for the Christina Stead Prize for Fiction, and the Ethnic Affairs Commission Award in the 1997 NSW Premier′s Literary Awards. It won the 1997 Tilly Aston Braille Book of the Year Award.

== Novels ==
- Seasonal Adjustments, Allen & Unwin, 1994, ISBN 978-1-86373-652-7
- Solitude of Illusions, Allen & Unwin, 1996, ISBN 978-1-86448-147-1
- The Storyteller, Flamingo, 2000, ISBN 978-0-7322-6787-2
- Homecoming, Flamingo, 2003, ISBN 978-0-7322-7708-6
- Spiral Road, HarperCollins Publishers Limited, 2007, ISBN 978-0-7322-8417-6

== See also ==
- Bangladeshi English literature
