= Michael Brennan (poet) =

Australian poet

Michael Brennan (born 1973) is an Australian poet. He is the founder of publisher Vagabond Press.

== Published Collections (in order of release) ==
- The Imageless World, 2003 (Salt Publishing)
- Language Habits (Chapbook), 2006 (Vagabond Press)
- Sky was Sky (with Akiko Muto), 2007, translated by Yasuhiro Yotsumoto (Vagabond Press)
- Unanimous Night, 2008 (Salt Publishing)
- Autoethnographic, 2012 (Giramondo)
- Alibi, 2015, Japanese Edition, translated by Yasuhiro Yotsumoto (Vagabond Press)
- The Earth Here, 2018 (ASM)

== Teaching and other external work ==
=== Teaching ===
Brennan has taught English literature and cultural studies at universities in both Australia and Japan. From 2004 to 2019, Brennan lived in Japan and worked as an author, editor, book designer and university teacher. In 2019, he resigned from a tenured gig at a university in Tokyo to return to Sydney to focus on writing and publishing with Vagabond Press.

=== Editing ===
Brennan has contributed as an editor to a number of texts, including Absence and Negativity (2000), Calyx: 30 Contemporary Australian Poets(2000), and Noel Rowe's Posthumous collection: A Cool and Shaded Heart: Collected poems(2008). He also published 'Living Systems' in 2024, an anthology bringing together 170 poets from Asia Pacific and 25 years of poetry publishing.

=== Poetry International Web ===
Brennan contributed to Poetry International as the Australian editor from 2004 to 2012, selecting poets and writing introductions to their work. In regards to the international connections made through Poetry International Web, Brennan said “one of the most exciting aspects of the Poetry International Website, (is) the ability to move beyond the pragmatic boundaries of nation, and support engagements that might otherwise not happen”. “I would like to keep building the site so that it becomes more inclusive, better able to show the sheer breadth of difference available in poetry stemming from Australia”

== Vagabond Press ==
Brennan established Vagabond Press in July 1999. Vagabond Press started with the Rare Objects Series, small handmade chapbooks of poetry, which would grow to include over 100 different authors by 2014. All titles in the series are written by Australian poets. The concept of the Rare Objects Series is that there are only a limited number of copies of each title, with only 100 being published each time. Each copy of each title throughout the series was signed by the author, and given a number from 1–100. Vagabond Press has stated that the series was based on “a combination of the design values of French press Fata Morgana and Neil Astley's beautiful Poetical Histories series”.. Building on the success of the Rare Objects Series, Vagabond Press started publishing full-length collections.

As of 2026, Vagabond Press has published over 300 titles and won or shortlisted for all the key literary awards for poetry in Australia thanks to the support of Creative Australia and the global community of readers of Vagabond books.
