= Scripsi =

Australian literary periodical published from 1981 to 1994

Scripsi was an Australian literary periodical published from 1981 to 1994 in Melbourne, first from the English Department and subsequently from Ormond College of the University of Melbourne. Its name comes from Pontius Pilate's assertion "Quod scripsi, scripsi" (What I have written, I have written).

== History and profile ==
Scripsi was founded in 1981 by Michael Heyward and Peter Craven, who met while studying at the University of Melbourne. Craven and Heyward co-edited the journal until 1989, when Heyward left. For many years, the poetry editor was John Forbes and the graphics editor was Bill Henson. Associate Editors included Penny Hueston, Philippa Hawker, Owen Richardson and Andrew Rutherford. The latter two were briefly co-editors, in 1993–4. Editorial assistants included Rosemary Hunter and Rosemary Sorensen.

For several years in the 1980s a weekly radio show, Scripsi of the Air, was also presented by Heyward, Craven and others on Melbourne Radio Station 3RRR. In 1989 a single number was published by Penguin Books Australia Ltd. From 1991 to 1994 the magazine was published by Oxford University Press. Otherwise later numbers were described as published 'at' Ormond College.

The magazine was widely regarded at the time as one of the world's finest literary magazines. It published a wide variety of Australian writers, in fiction, poetry and non-fiction, and attracted contributions from world-famous literary figures such as Susan Sontag, Salman Rushdie, Georges Perec, John Ashbery, August Kleinzahler and others. Ostensibly a quarterly, Scripsi's gradually slowing publishing rate, rarely managing more than three issues a year, led the Australia Council to withdraw funding in 1994, and the magazine closed the same year.
