= Vivian Smith (poet) =

Australian poet

Vivian Smith FAHA
- Born: Vivian Brian Smith; 3 June 1933; Hobart, Tasmania, Australia
- Occupation: poet
- Writing career
- Language: English
- Years active: 1950–
- Notable work: Tide Country

Vivian Brian Smith FAHA (born 3 June 1933) is an Australian poet. He is considered one of the most lyrical and observant Australian poets of his generation.

== Early life ==
Smith was born in Hobart, Tasmania and studied French at the University of Tasmania from which he graduated with a Master of Arts. He left Tasmania in the late 1950s and has lived since then in Sydney, where he was a longtime professor at the University of Sydney until his retirement in the early 2000s. He returns to Tasmania every year and his poetry is still influenced by the landscape there. Smith has published criticism as well as a bibliography of the work of Patrick White. He has been an advocate of Australian literature and of many individual Australian writers.

== Writing career ==
Smith's first book of poetry, The Other Meaning, was published in 1956 and he has since published eight further collections, among which Tide Country won the New South Wales Premier's Prize for Poetry and the Grace Leven Prize. A key later collection is Along The Line (Salt, 2007). He is a highly respected critic, having produced key studies on Australian literature and contributed much to the growth and sophistication of criticism surrounding Australian poetry. With his fellow poet and great friend, the late Noel Rowe, he published the anthology Windchimes: Asia in Australian Poetry (Pandanus Books 2006).

== Oral history ==
Smith was interviewed in 1971 by Hazel de Berg about his life history and career. The recording can be found at the National Library of Australia.

== Awards and recognition ==
Smith won the Kenneth Slessor Prize for Poetry in 1983 and the Patrick White Award in 1997. He was elected a Fellow of the Australian Academy of the Humanities in 1998.

== Bibliography ==
=== Poetry collections ===
- The Other Meaning (1956)
- An Island South (1967)
- Familiar Places : Poems (1978)
- Tide Country (1982)
- Selected Poems (1985)
- New Selected Poems (1995)
- Late News (2000)
- Along the Line (2006)
- The Other Side of Things (2008)
- Traveller's Tale : And Other Poems (2011)
- Here, There and Elsewhere (2012)

=== Anthologies ===
- Australian Poetry 1969 (1969) edited
- Young St Poets Anthology (1981) edited
- Quadrant Twenty-Five Years (1982) edited with Lee Shrubb and Peter Coleman
- Effects of Light : The Poetry of Tasmania (1985) edited with Margaret Scott
- Australian Poetry 1986 : the finest of recent Australian poetry (1986) edited
- Australian Poetry 1988 : the finest of recent Australian poetry (1988) edited
- Sydney's Poems : A Selection on the Occasion of the City's One Hundred and Fiftieth Anniversary 1842-1992 (1992) edited with Robert Gray
- Windchimes : Asia in Australian Poetry (2006) edited with Noel Rowe

=== Non-fiction ===
- The Writing of Novels and Short Stories, [and], James McAuley's Recent Poetry edited with Gavin Casey (1964)
- Smith, Vivian, ed. (1977). Letters of Vance and Nettie Palmer, 1915-1963. Canberra: National Library of Australia.
- Nettie Palmer : Her Private Journal Fourteen Years, Poems, Reviews and Literary Essays (1988)
- Catalano, Gary (December 1995). "Vivian Smith". Quadrant. 39 (12): 57–60.
