= Fay Zwicky =

Australian poet, academic

- Born: Julia Fay Rosefield; 4 July 1933; Melbourne, Victoria, Australia
- Died: 2 July 2017 (aged 83); Perth, Western Australia
- Education: University of Melbourne
- Writing career
- Language: English
- Notable awards: Kenneth Slessor Prize for Poetry (1982); Patrick White Award (2005)

Fay Zwicky (4 July 1933 – 2 July 2017) was an Australian poet, short story writer, critic and academic primarily known for her autobiographical poem Kaddish, which deals with her identity as a Jewish writer.

== Life ==
Born Julia Fay Rosefield, Zwicky grew up in suburban Melbourne. Her family was fourth generation Australian—her father, a doctor; her mother, a musician. Zwicky was an accomplished pianist by the age of six, and performed with her violinist and cellist sisters while still at school. After completing her schooling at Anglican institutions, she entered the University of Melbourne in 1950, receiving her Bachelor of Arts in 1954. Descended from European Jews, she described herself as an "outsider" ("I was ashamed of my foreign interloper status") from an "Anglo-Saxon dominated" Australian culture. She began publishing poetry as an undergraduate, thereafter working as a musician, touring Europe, America and South-East Asia between 1955 and 1965.

She settled in Perth with her Swiss husband Karl Zwicky (the two married in 1957) and two children (one son, one daughter) and returned to literature working primarily as a Senior Lecturer in American and comparative literature at the University of Western Australia until her retirement in 1987. From 1978 to 1981 she was a member of the Literature Board of the Australia Council in Sydney. After her retirement she concentrated on her writing, which won her international recognition.

In 1990, Zwicky married her second husband James Mackie, who died before her. She led a reclusive life in Perth: "I never expect anything. I always think I'm drifting and nobody knows I'm here, and it's great." In 2004, Fay Zwicky was declared a Western Australian "Living Treasure", a term she called "repulsive ... like being prematurely obituarized."

== Work ==
Recurrent themes of Zwicky's were the relation between art and the artist, the exploration of the author's Jewish heritage and autobiographical experiences. Her poetry collections won several awards. The committee for the Patrick White Award praised Zwicky as "one of Australia's most original and accomplished poets". The Cambridge Guide to Literature in English describes her style as "densely textured but elegant and direct".

Zwicky's first collection, Isaac Babel's Fiddle (1975) included a number of poems about her Lithuanian grandfather and his cultural displacement in Australia, which nevertheless saved him from the Holocaust ("Summer Pogrom", "Totem and Taboo"). Zwicky also writes of her own alienation, in spite of her being "whiter than Persil".

The title poem of her most-admired collection, Kaddish (1982), is an elegy for her father who died at sea. In her poem Zwicky uses the Aramaic phrases of the traditional prayer of mourning to frame her own memorial prayer detailing her complex relationship with her father. She draws on the Haggadah, the Passover Seder night liturgy. Kaddish "also uses the Lord’s Prayer and invokes God in female form as a goddess. Ivor Indyk describes Kaddish as "a mosaic of textual citations, of the Kaddish, the Passover Haggadah and numerous allusions to myth and nursery rhyme."

Ask Me, Zwicky's third book of poetry, contained poems on China, America, and a series of religious poems on the deities of the Hindu pantheon ("Ganesh", "Vishnu", "Siva", and the goddess "Devi"). In Zwicky's subsequent books she developed a sparser style of poetry. In the title poem of The Gatekeeper’s Wife Zwicky wrote of the devastating loss of her husband, and recalls the custom of lighting a memorial candle. In "Losing Track" the death of her husband is linked with the Jewish loss of Zion. The collection included an elegy, "Banksia Blechifolia", for Primo Levi, and "Groundswell for Ginsberg", an homage to Allen Ginsberg.

Her last collection of poems, Picnic, published in 2006, included primarily poems about the nature of poetry and the poet's role in the world. Aside from her poetry, Zwicky published a collection of short stories, Hostages, in 1983, and a collection of essays on literature and survival, The Lyre in the Pawnshop, in 1986. In her essays Zwicky traced the ways in which the construction of an Australian literature has served to marginalise minority writers and women. She discussed the absence, until very lately, of any place for a Jewish writer in Australian literature: "Living and growing up in this country has been an exercise in repression".

== Death ==
Zwicky died in Perth, Western Australia on 2 July 2017, aged 83, two days before her 84th birthday.

== Awards and nominations ==
- 1982 – Kenneth Slessor Prize for Poetry for Kaddish and Other Poems
- 1987 – Western Australian Premier's Book Award for Non-fiction for The Lyre in the Pawnshop
- 1991 – Western Australian Premier's Book Award for Poetry for Ask Me
- 1998 – Western Australian Premier's Book Award for Poetry for The Gatekeeper's Wife
- 2005 – Patrick White Award
- 2006 – Christopher Brennan Award of the Fellowship of Australian Writers
- 2007 – New South Wales Premier's Literary Award for Poetry for Picnic

== Bibliography ==
Poetry

Year	Title	Imprint	ISBN
1975	Isaac Babel's Fiddle	Maximus	ISBN 0-909387-00-1
1982	Kaddish and Other Poems	University of Queensland Press	ISBN 0-7022-1680-1
1990	Ask Me	University of Queensland Press	ISBN 0702222828
1993	Fay Zwicky: Poems 1970-1992	University of Queensland Press	ISBN 0-7022-2466-9
1991	A Touch of Ginger: Poems (co-authored with Dennis Haskell	Folio	ISBN 9780646095035
1999	The Gatekeeper's Wife	Brandl & Schlesinger	ISBN 1-876040-04-1
2006	Afloat: And Other Poems	Picaro Press	OCLC 31445865
2006	Picnic: New Poems	Giramondo	ISBN 1920882189
2017	The Collected Poems of Fay Zwicky (ed. Lucy Dougan and T. Dolan)	University of Western Australia Press	ISBN 9781742589329

Short Stories

Year	Title	Imprint	ISBN
1983	Hostages: Stories	Fremantle Arts Centre Press	ISBN 0-909144-67-2

Essays

- The Lyre in the Pawnshop: Essays on Literature and Survival 1974–1984 (UWAP, 1986) ISBN 0-85564-267-X

Anthologies

Year	Title	Imprint	ISBN
1982	Quarry: A Selection of Western Australian Poetry	Fremantle Arts Centre Press	ISBN 0909144389
1982	Journeys: Judith Wright, Rosemary Dobson, Gwen Harwood, Dorothy Hewett	Sisters Publishing	ISBN 0908207484
1987	Procession: Youngstreet Poets Three	Hale & Iremonger	ISBN 0868062847
2010	The Witnesses (CD Series No. 19)	River Road Press	
