= Rhyll McMaster =

Australian author

- Born: 1947 (age 78–79); Brisbane, Queensland, Australia
- Occupation: Poet
- Writing career
- Notable awards: 1986 Grace Leven Prize for Poetry, winner; 2008 Barbara Jefferis Award, winner

Rhyll McMaster (born 1947 in Brisbane) is a contemporary Australian poet and novelist. She has worked as a secretary, a nurse and a sheep farmer. She now lives in Sydney and has written full-time since 2000. She is a recipient of the Barbara Jefferis Award.

== Biography ==
Her poems have been appearing in Australian publications since she was sixteen. Her first book of poetry, The Brineshrimp, 1972, won the Harri Jones Memorial Prize for Poetry; Washing the Money, 1986, was awarded the C.J. Dennis Prize for Poetry and the Grace Leven Prize for Poetry. On My Empty Feet was published in 1993 and poems from that selection were broadcast as a play for radio by the Australian Broadcasting Corporation in 1996. Flying the Coop, New and Selected Poems, 1972-1994, was awarded the Grace Leven Prize for Poetry in 1994. Chemical Bodies, A Diary of Probable Events, 1994-1997 was published in 1997. Evolutionary History of Edward Kelly in Primary Colours, a response to nine of Sir Sidney Nolan's Ned Kelly paintings, was commissioned by the Nolan Gallery and published in an illustrated limited edition, with a foreword by Geoffrey Dutton in 1999. Late Night Shopping was published in 2012.

Her first novel, Feather Man was published in Australia by Brandl & Schlesinger in 2007 and in the UK, US & Canada by Marion Boyars Publishers, 2008. It was awarded the inaugural 2008 Barbara Jefferis Award and the UTS Glenda Adams Award for New Writing, New South Wales Premier's Literary Awards, 2008. It was shortlisted for the Vance Palmer Prize for Fiction, Victorian Premier's Literary Award, 2007 and for the Australian Literature Society Gold Medal, 2008 for an outstanding literary work. Feather Man has now been translated into Mandarin and Ukrainian.

McMaster has also been employed by The Canberra Times as a poetry editor and as a book reviewer by The Sydney Morning Herald, The Australian and Australian Book Review.

McMaster has been a chairperson and judge of the "NSW Premier's Literary Awards" and fellowships, and a panel chair at the Sydney Writer's Festival.

== Bibliography ==
=== Poetry collections ===
- —— (1972). The Brineshrimp. University of Queensland Press. ISBN 9780702207631.
- —— (1986) Washing the Money : Poems with Photographs
- —— (1993). On My Empty Feet. William Heinemann. ISBN 9780855615222.
- —— (1994). Flying the Coop: New and Selected Poems 1972–1994. William Heinemann. ISBN 9780855616274.
- —— (1997). Chemical Bodies: A Diary of Probable Events, 1994–1997. Brandl & Schlesinger. ISBN 9781876040055.
- —— (1999). Evolutionary History of Edward Kelly in Primary Colours. Edition & Artist Book Studio, ANU, for the Cultural Facilities Corporation, ACT.
- —— (2013). Late Night Shopping. Brandl & Schlesinger. ISBN 9781921556302.

=== Novels ===
- —— (2007). Feather Man (paperback ed.). Blackheath: Brandl & Schlesinger. ISBN 9781876040833.

=== Selected book reviews ===
Year	Review article	Work(s) reviewed
2011	McMaster, Rhyll (June 2011). "Having it both ways". Australian Book Review (332): 58.	Johnson, Judy (2011). The secret fate of Mary Watson. Fourth Estate.
