= Bruce Beaver =

Australian poet and novelist

- Born: Bruce Victor Beaver; 14 February 1928; Manly, New South Wales, Australia
- Died: 17 February 2004 (aged 76)
- Occupations: Poet and novelist
- Writing career
- Notable awards: 1982 Patrick White Award

Bruce Victor Beaver AM (14 February 1928 – 17 February 2004) was an Australian poet and novelist.

== Biography ==
Beaver was born in Manly, New South Wales. He was educated at the Manly Public School and at the Sydney Boys' High School. He worked at a number of jobs, as a cow farmer, in radio, as a wages clerk, a surveyor's labourer, fruit-picker, proof-reader and journalist, before deciding to write full-time. From 1958 to 1962, he lived in New Zealand and Norfolk Island.

In 1961 Beaver's first book of poetry was published. He wrote his first poem in response to the dropping of the atomic bomb at Hiroshima, and continued to write even while working as a labourer. Thanks to his marriage, he was able to become a full-time writer. Even though he suffered from bipolar disorder, Beaver was able to continue writing until close to his death in 2004.

When asked to list their favourite books, Dorothy Porter named Bruce Beaver and is quoted as saying:

Bruce Beaver is one of Australia's greatest and most magical poets. I have been carrying his book Charmed Lives (UQP) around in my bag like an amulet. His poetry is pungent, discursive, feral, disturbing, wise and very funny. Charmed Lives is out of print. It shouldn't be.

== Awards ==
- 1970: Grace Leven Prize for Poetry (for Letters to Live Poets)
- 1982: Patrick White Award
- 1990: New South Wales Premier's Literary Awards (Special Award)
- 1991: Member of the Order of Australia
- 1995: C. J. Dennis Prize for Poetry (for Anima and Other Poems)
- 1995: Wesley Michel Wright Prize

== Bibliography ==
=== Poetry ===
- Under the Bridge (1961) Sydney: Beaujon Press.
- Seawall and Shoreline (1964) Sydney: South Head Press.
- Open at Random (1967) Sydney: South Head Press.
- Letters to Live Poets (1969) Sydney: South Head Press. ISBN 0-901760-01-3
- Lauds and plaints : poems (1968-1972) (1974) Sydney: South Head Press.
- Odes and Days (1975) Sydney: South Head Press. ISBN 0-901760-15-3
- Death's Directives (1978) Sydney. New Poetry/Prism Books. ISBN 0-85869-022-5
- Headlands: Prose sketches (1986) St. Lucia: University of Queensland Press.
- Charmed lives (1988) St. Lucia: University of Queensland Press. ISBN 0-7022-2141-4
- New and Selected Poems 1960-1990 (1991) St. Lucia: University of Queensland Press. ISBN 0-7022-2338-7
- Anima and Other Poems (1994) St. Lucia: University of Queensland Press. ISBN 0-7022-2612-2
- Poets and others (1999) Sydney: Brandl & Schlesinger.
- The Long Game and Other Poems (2005) St. Lucia: University of Queensland Press. ISBN 0-7022-3509-1 review

==== Autobiography ====
- As it was ... (1979) St. Lucia: University of Queensland Press. ISBN 0-7022-1278-4

==== Novels ====
- The Hot Summer (1963) Sydney: Horwitz.
- Hot Sands (1964) Sydney: Horwitz.
- The Hot Men (1965) Sydney: Horwitz.
- The Hot Spring (1965) Sydney: Horwitz.
- You Can't Come Back (1966) Adelaide: Rigby. ISBN 1-86302-140-X
