= Hyland House Museum =

Historic house in Connecticut, United States

- Hyland–Wildman House
- U.S. National Register of Historic Places
- U.S. Historic district – Contributing property
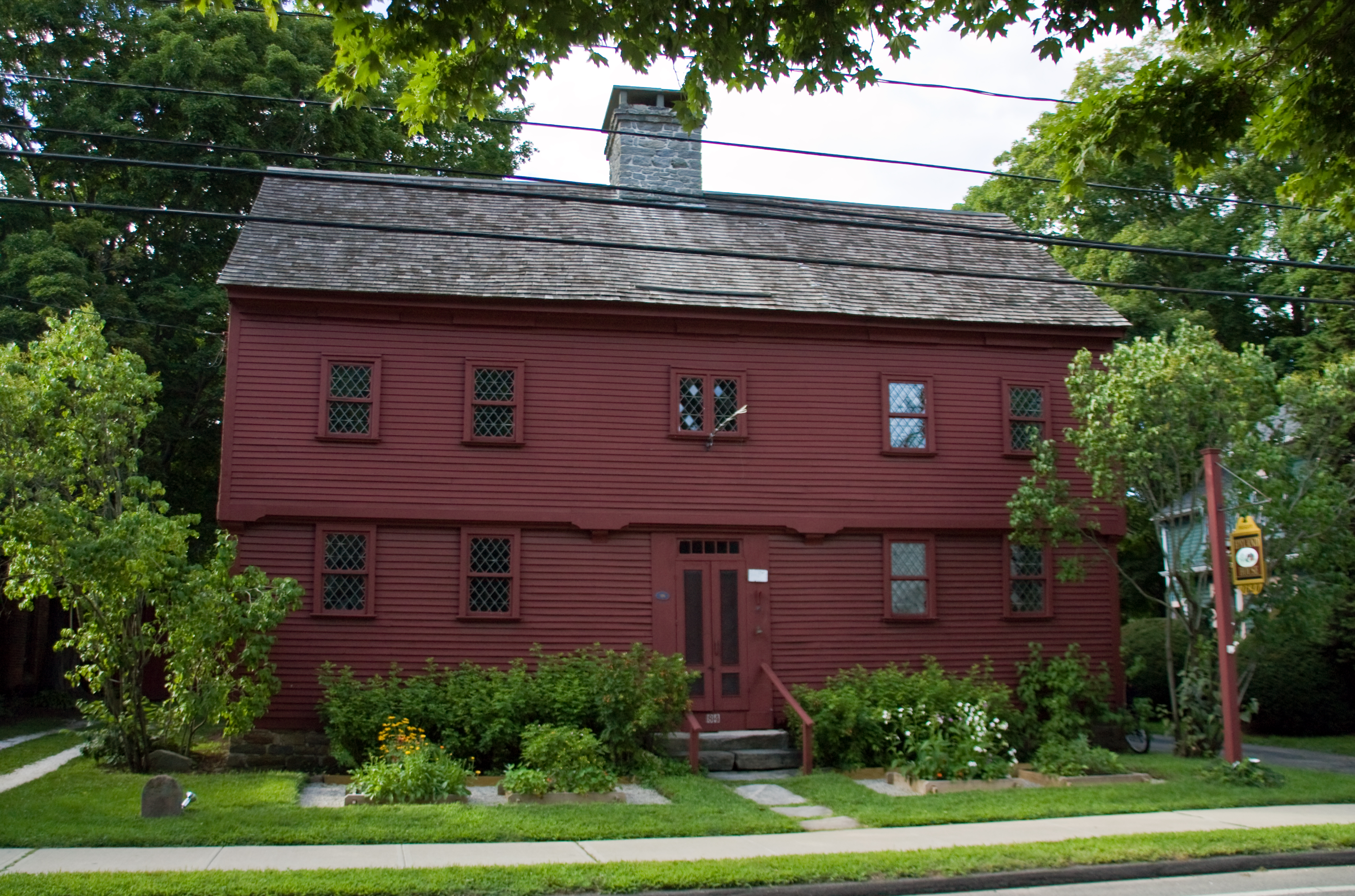

- Location within Connecticut Location within the United States
- Location: 84 Boston Street, Guilford, Connecticut
- Coordinates: 41°16′57″N 72°40′43″W
- Area: 1 acre (0.40 ha)
- Built: 1713
- Architect: Parmelee, Isaac
- Architectural style: Colonial
- Website: http://hylandhouse.org
- Part of: Guilford Historic Town Center (ID76001988)
- NRHP reference No.: 76001989

Significant dates
- Added to NRHP: March 26, 1976
- Designated CP: July 6, 1976

The Hyland House Museum or Hyland–Wildman House is a historic house museum at 84 Boston Street in Guilford, Connecticut. Built in 1713, it is one of the town's best-preserved houses of that period. It has been open to the public as a museum since 1918, under the auspices of a local historic preservation group. It was added to the National Register of Historic Places in 1976. The house features Colonial-era furnishings and artifacts.

== Description and history ==
The Hyland House is located a short way east of Guilford's central town green, on the north side of Boston Street just east of Graves Avenue. It is a 2 1/2-story wood-frame structure, with a gabled roof, stone central chimney, and clapboarded exterior. Its main facade is five bays wide, with small-pane diamond-lighted windows arranged symmetrically around the center entrance. The entrance is simply framed, with a five-light transom window above. The rear roof face extends to the first floor, giving the house a classic New England saltbox profile. Its interior is noted for its decoratively chamfered girts, believed to be one an early example of this type of decoration.

The house has long been ascribed a construction date of about 1660, when builder George Hyland is thought to have built a house on this property. However, tree-ring dating conducted on its major timbers dates its construction to about 1713 or soon afterward, likely by the then-landowner, Isaac Parmelee. The house underwent an extensive restoration in 1917 by the architectural historian Norman Isham. The restoration was funded by the Society for the Preservation of New England Antiquities, now Historic New England.

== See also ==
- List of the oldest buildings in Connecticut
- National Register of Historic Places listings in New Haven County, Connecticut
