= 1992 in Australian literature =

This article presents a list of the historical events and publications of Australian literature during 1992.

== Events ==
- Tim Winton won the Miles Franklin Award for Cloudstreet

== Major publications ==
=== Novels ===
- Thea Astley – Vanishing Points
- Brian Castro – After China
- Helen Garner – Cosmo Cosmolino
- Peter Goldsworthy – Honk If You Are Jesus
- Marion Halligan – Lovers' Knots
- Janette Turner Hospital – The Last Magician
- Thomas Keneally – Woman of the Inner Sea
- Roger McDonald – Shearers' Motel
- Andrew McGahan – Praise
- Alex Miller – The Ancestor Game

=== Children's and young adult fiction ===
- Pamela Allen – Belinda
- Brian Caswell – A Cage of Butterflies
- Garry Disher – The Bamboo Flute
- Anna Fienberg – Ariel, Zed and the Secret of Life
- Joanne Horniman – Sand Monkeys
- Victor Kelleher – Del-Del
- Melina Marchetta – Looking for Alibrandi

=== Crime and mystery ===
- Peter Corris
  - Beware of the Dog
  - Browning, P.I.
  - The Japanese Job
  - Set Up
- Marele Day – The Last Tango of Dolores Delgado
- Garry Disher – Paydirt
- Kerry Greenwood – Death at Victoria Dock
- Gabrielle Lord – Whipping Boy
- Jan McKemmish – Only Lawyers Dancing

=== Science fiction and fantasy ===
- Terry Dowling – Blue Tyson
- Greg Egan
  - "The Hundred Light-Year Diary"
  - Quarantine
  - "Unstable Orbits in the Space of Lies"
  - "The Walk"
- Sean McMullen – Call to the Edge (short stories)

=== Poetry ===
- Beatriz Copello – Women, Souls And Shadows
- Robert Harris – Jane, Interlinear and Other Poems
- A. D. Hope – Selected Poems
- Jill Jones – The Mask and the Jagged Star
- Les Murray – Translations from the Natural World
- Elizabeth Riddell – Selected Poems
- John Tranter — The Floor of Heaven

=== Drama ===
- Louis Nowra
  - Così
  - Summer of the Aliens

=== Non-fiction ===
- Robert Adamson – Wards of the State
- Stephanie Dowrick – Intimacy and Solitude
- Sara Henderson – From Strength to Strength: An Autobiography
- A. D. Hope – Chance Encounters
- Ruth Park – A Fence Around the Cuckoo
- Donna Williams – Nobody Nowhere

== Awards and honours ==
- Thea Astley AO for "service to Australian literature"
- Jack Pollard OAM for "service to sport and sporting history"

=== Lifetime achievement ===
Award	Author
Christopher Brennan Award	R. A. Simpson; Oodgeroo Noonuccal
Patrick White Award	Peter Cowan

=== Literary ===
Award	Author	Title	Publisher
The Age Book of the Year Award	Marion Halligan	Lovers' Knots	Heinemann
ALS Gold Medal	Rodney Hall	The Second Bridegroom	McPhee Gribble
Colin Roderick Award	Ruth Park	A Fence Around the Cuckoo	Viking
New South Wales Premier's Literary Awards – Book of the Year	Elizabeth Riddell	Selected Poems	Angus and Robertson

=== Fiction ===
==== National ====
Award	Author	Title	Publisher
Adelaide Festival Awards for Literature	David Malouf	The Great World	Chatto & Windus
The Age Book of the Year Award	Marion Halligan	Lovers' Knots	Heinemann
The Australian/Vogel Literary Award	Fotini Epanomitis	The Mule's Foal	Allen & Unwin
Miles Franklin Award	Tim Winton	Cloudstreet	Penguin Books
New South Wales Premier's Literary Awards	Simon Leys	The Death of Napoleon	Allen & Unwin
Victorian Premier's Literary Awards	Brian Castro	Double-Wolf	Allen & Unwin
Western Australian Premier's Book Awards	Philip Salom	Playback	Fremantle Arts Centre Press

=== Poetry ===
Award	Author	Title	Publisher
Adelaide Festival Awards for Literature	Vincent Buckley	Last Poems	McPhee Gribble
Anne Elder Award	Nicolette Stasko	Abundance	Angus & Robertson
Grace Leven Prize for Poetry	Kevin Hart	Peniel	Golvan Arts
Grace Leven Prize for Poetry	Gary Catalano	The Empire of Grass : Twenty-Eight Poems : 1983-1989	University of Queensland Press
Mary Gilmore Award	Alison Croggon	This is the Stone	Penguin
New South Wales Premier's Literary Awards	Elizabeth Riddell	Selected Poems	Angus & Robertson
Victorian Premier's Literary Awards	Robert Harris	Jane, Interlinear and Other Poems	Paper Bark Press

=== Children and Young Adult ===
Award	Category	Author	Title	Publisher
Adelaide Festival Awards for Literature	Children's	Eleanor Nilsson	The House Guest	Viking Books
Children's Book of the Year Award	Older Readers	Eleanor Nilsson	The House Guest	Viking Books
Children's Book of the Year Award	Picture Book	Jeannie Baker	Window	Julia MacRae
New South Wales Premier's Literary Awards	Young People's Literature	Robin Klein	All in the Blue Unclouded Weather	Penguin Books Australia
Victorian Premier's Prize for Young Adult Fiction		Eleanor Nilsson	The House Guest	Viking

=== Science fiction and fantasy ===
Award	Category	Author	Title	Publisher
Australian SF Achievement Award	Best Australian Long Fiction	Terry Dowling	Wormwood	Aphelion
Australian SF Achievement Award	Best Australian Short Fiction	Sean McMullen	"Alone in His Chariot"	Eidolon #4 Summer 1991

=== Drama ===
Award	Category	Author	Title
New South Wales Premier's Literary Awards	FilmScript	Marc Rosenberg	Dingo
New South Wales Premier's Literary Awards	Play	Louis Nowra	Cosi
Victorian Premier's Literary Awards	Drama	Jocelyn Moorhouse	Proof

=== Non-fiction ===
Award	Author	Title	Publisher
Adelaide Festival Awards for Literature	David Marr	Patrick White : A Life	Random House Australia
The Age Book of the Year Award	Ruth Park	A Fence Around the Cuckoo	Viking
New South Wales Premier's Literary Awards	David Marr	Patrick White : A Life	Random House Australia
Victorian Premier's Literary Awards	David Marr	Patrick White : A Life	Random House Australia

== Deaths ==
A list, ordered by date of death (and, if the date is either unspecified or repeated, ordered alphabetically by surname) of deaths in 1992 of Australian literary figures, authors of written works or literature-related individuals follows, including year of birth.

- 28 January — Dora Birtles, novelist, short-story writer, poet and travel writer (born 1903)
- 8 February — Roland Robinson, poet, writer and collector of Australian Aboriginal myths (born 1912)
- 24 May — Beatrice Davis, Australia's first full-time book editor (born 1909)
- 19 June — Jas H. Duke, performance poet (born 1939)
- 22 October — Peter Pinney, novelist and travel writer (born 1922)
- 6 December — Mary Finnin, artist, art teacher and poet (born 1906)
- 21 December — Paul White, missionary, evangelist, radio program host and author of the Jungle Doctor Series (born 1910)

== See also ==
- 1992 in Australia
- 1992 in literature
- 1992 in poetry
- List of years in literature
- List of years in Australian literature
