= Only the Heart =

Novel written by Brian Caswell and David Phu An Chiem

- First edition (publ. UQP)
- Author: Brian Caswell and David Phu An Chiem
- Subject: Vietnamese boat people, the Vietnam war
- Genre: Fiction
- Publisher: University of Queensland Press
- Publication date: 1997
- Pages: 212 pages
- ISBN: 070222927X
- OCLC: 38413149

Only The Heart is a novel written by Brian Caswell and David Phu An Chiem about the Vietnamese boat people. It was first published in 1997. In contrast to Caswell's mainly futuristic style, such as his widely acclaimed Deucalion series, this book is written in the present-past style. The book is said to be based on David's life. The book is classified as young adult fiction and is one of the most successful books by the author.

== Plot summary ==
The main character for this story is a boy named Toan. The book jumps from the past, when Toan is only six years old, to the present, when he is in his teens. The book is mainly written in first person, Toan's and his older cousin's, Linh's point of view.

This book is about the Vietnam war, and the problems and hardships the Vietnamese people faced while trying to escape their war stricken country. During the book, Toan and his family escape Vietnam, on a boat. They become part of the first wave of boat people. During the boat trip, Phuong (Toan's cousin) is almost captured by sea pirates, but her mother saves her from becoming a sex slave, by offering herself, in fair exchange and sacrifice for the safety of Phuong. She is taken away and never seen by her family again. This was not her fault however, this was forced upon her through the Vietnam gangs. When the family makes it to Malaysia, the Malaysian people try to send them back, but they destroy the ship, forcing everyone to go overboard. Toan almost drowns. When they make it to Malaysia, they are on a list waiting to be transferred to another country so they can be safe from the war in Vietnam. After being late for their time to leave, Toan's father takes matters into his own hands. They escape from their "home" and chase after the dream for a better life for their family. They end up in Australia.

This novel is filled with hope. It shows the inside of Vietnam, the way people feel about the war and the experiences that were experienced, that caused the Vietnamese people, to become stronger and more resilient. Only the heart is filled with hope, desolation and a dream. A dream for a better future... of freedom.

== Trivia ==
David Phu An Chiem, a Vietnamese refugee himself went on to become a successful actor, author and Founder and CEO of MindChamps PreSchool. He excelled in school despite not being able to speak a word of English when he first arrived in Australia. He became the first Asian (beating thousands who auditioned for the role) to be cast in an Australian TV series, Butterfly Island.
