= Horniman (disambiguation) =

Horniman is an English surname.

Horniman may also refer to:

- Horniman's Tea, a brand of tea owned by Douwe Egberts, the successor to the tea trading and blending business Horniman's Tea Company
- the Horniman Museum, Forest Hill, South London; funded by Frederick John Horniman, owner of the Horniman Tea Company
- Emslie Horniman's Pleasance, park in the Borough of Kensington and Chelsea, London; named after Emslie John Horniman, son of Frederick John Horniman
- Horniman Circle Gardens, park in South Mumbai, India; named after Benjamin Guy Horniman
