= Service Excellence – Health Care =

In United States healthcare, service excellence is the ability of the provider to consistently meet and manage patient expectations. Clinical excellence must be the priority for any health care system. However, the best healthcare systems combine professional (clinical) service excellence with outstanding personal service. Although health care in the United States is touted as the “world’s largest service industry,” the quality of the service is infrequently discussed in medical literature. Thus, many questions regarding service excellence in healthcare largely remain unanswered.

Service excellence in healthcare is difficult to define and better described as a “I know when I receive it, or perhaps more frequently, I know when I have not.” According to Robert Johnson (Institute of Customer Service), service excellence has four key elements: delivering the promise of quality healthcare, providing a personal touch, doing a more than adequate job and resolving problems well.

In order to achieve these elements, healthcare institutions, in particular, must be concerned with reducing the drivers of dissatisfaction, and providing exceptional healthcare. According to the federal Agency for Healthcare Research and Quality (AHRQ), exceptional healthcare is defined as “doing the right thing, at the right time, for the right person, and having the best quality result [outcome].”

== Methods to evaluate quality of care ==
During the past decade, healthcare has been receiving increased attention not only because of unsustainable costs, but also because of an emphasis on quality of care improvement. Institutions are now attempting to measure and compare quality outcomes, as well as report them in both the consumer press and peer reviews literature to the delight of some and the consternation of others. Managers of healthcare delivery systems endeavor to provide the highest possible care achievable. Inherent to this goal is the need for evaluation of the quality of the health services provided. Measuring patient satisfaction is an indirect measure of quality, and can pose some difficult challenges to individuals attempting to assess quality. One difficulty is that in healthcare it is difficult to assess a patient's outcome after receiving care compared to the outcome they would have had with a different provider. The most important problem is establishing a definition of “satisfaction.” Because the definition of satisfaction can vary from patient to patient, many institutions have created surveys asking patients to rate the quality of the services they have received. This method of evaluation is extremely subjective, and many factors unrelated to the quality of care (the topic of interest) can affect the results. For example, a review of 37 studies addressing different methods of satisfaction evaluation found that phone interview increased the response rate by 30%. Additionally, mailing surveys resulted in more criticism and less satisfaction. Some speculate that this is due to the anonymity and a lack of pressure for socially acceptable responses. Mailing surveys also results in more variability in response than a phone survey with patients either feeling really satisfied or dissatisfied. Even the timing of administration of the survey can have a major effect on the results. The literature of the studies in this area suggests further research needs to be conducted on this topic. Crow et al. also point out that if patients are not constrained by outside factors, the selection of which healthcare facility to receive care in is an objective measurement of a their satisfaction. When satisfaction is low, a service failure has occurred.

=== Service Failure ===
Every patient has a basic assumption that the healthcare services they seek, and pay for, will meet their expectations. If these expectations are met then they are satisfied. Moreover, if these expectations are exceeded the patient is delighted, and much more likely to recommend the healthcare institution to friends and family members. However, when these expectations are not met the patient is much more likely to share this disappointment with more than just their immediate circle. Service failures are inevitable, but anticipating service failures can significantly affect patient satisfaction. A measure of a well-managed organization is whether they work hard to plan for, prevent, identify, and correct any and all service failures. These steps are key because if a patient experiences a service failure early in their encounters with a healthcare institutions, it's likely to weigh more heavily on their decisions to return to the healthcare institution. More important, however, is whether the service failure is corrected because patients are not very tolerant of poor service recovery. Meaning, if a patient experiences the same service failure twice it is likely this patient will be lost to the institution forever. A study conducted by Bowen and Johnson suggests that this is true because patients are more angered by the belief that the system in which the service failure occurred remains unchanged than their dissatisfaction with the service itself. In other words, patients are put off by a healthcare organization that makes no efforts to correct its mistakes. Learning the sources of service failures is not only important to the customer, but it is also important to the bottom line.

=== Sources of Service Failure ===
Every point in the healthcare experience has a potential to result in a service failure. For example, if a health service takes longer than a patient expects, or if a service does have the outcome the patient was anticipating, a service failure has occurred. Even the setting or environment in which the care is being provided can affect a service failure. Perhaps surprisingly, patients themselves can contribute to service failures by failing to read signage or correctly completing required forms. Finally, rude, untrained, or poorly trained staff members can bring about a service failure. Thus, the service product, setting, delivery system, and staff must be carefully managed to minimize the likelihood of a service failure. If a healthcare institution does not make changes in response to a service failure, it fails twice:

- once because it was unable to meet the basic expectations of the patient, and
- the second time because it did not resolve the circumstances that lead to the service failure. This can be difficult to accomplish because it is the patient who defines the quality of the experience, and by association the nature and severity of the service failure. However, regardless of the cause of the failure it can lead to Patient Defection.

=== Patient Defection ===
Decreasing service failures and focusing on service excellence can decrease patient defection (leaving one healthcare institution for another). Having a solid service recovery plan when service failures do occur is key to ensuing an excellent healthcare experience for every patient. Service failures resulting in patient defection do not only derail the goal of service excellence, but they affect the bottom line. A study performed by Reichheld and Sasser found that reducing patient defection by 5% can raise profits between 25%-85%.

== Programs focusing on Service Excellence in Healthcare ==
Often there is a gap between what an organization wants to do and what the employees actually do, so many times many institutions set up infrastructure to focus on service excellence. In an effort to provide patients with the highest possible quality of clinical care, the National institute of clinical excellence (NICE) was created. This program attempts to provide health professionals in the United Kingdom National Health Service (NHS) with the skills they need to provide high-quality cost-effective clinical care by focusing on Service Excellence. These efforts are not unique to the United Kingdom. In Prescription for Excellence, Joseph Michelli gives a detailed review of the steps Ronald Reagan UCLA Medical Center has taken to provide service excellence in healthcare.

== Criticism ==
Service excellence in healthcare has been found to have unintended adverse effects:

- Higher patient satisfaction has been found to be associated with higher overall health care and prescription drug expenditures, and increased mortality.
- Focus on patient satisfaction metrics has redistributed resources from medical care to patient amenities, such as "valet parking, live music, custom-order room-service meals, and flat-screen televisions.
- Scripted interactions, designed to summarize key points in satisfaction questionnaires, make professionals feel robbed of their autonomy
- Treating patients as customers can lead to focusing on patients being happy, instead of being well
- Service to the customer may take the provider from the typical customer service approach, to striving to provide immediate customer gratification
