= Horniman =

English surname

Horniman is an English surname. Notable people with this surname include the following:

- Annie Horniman (1860–1937), English theatre patron and manager; daughter of Frederick John Horniman
- B. G. Horniman (1873–1948), British journalist, editor of the Bombay Chronicle, supporter of Indian independence
- Emslie Horniman (1863–1932), British anthropologist, philanthropist and Liberal Party politician; son of Frederick John Horniman
- Frederick John Horniman (1835–1906), English tea trader, collector and public benefactor
- Joanne Horniman (born 1951), Australian author for children, teenagers and young adults
- Roy Horniman (1874–1930), British writer, journalist and theatre owner
