= Selected Poems (Riddell collection) =

1992 Australian poetry collection

- Author: Elizabeth Riddell
- Language: English
- Genre: Poetry collection
- Publisher: Angus and Robertson
- Publication date: 1992
- Publication place: Australia
- Media type: Print
- Pages: 132 pp
- Awards: 1992 NSW Premier's Prize for Poetry, winner; 1993 ALS Gold Medal, winner
- ISBN: 0207173451

Selected Poems is a collection of poems by Australian poet Elizabeth Riddell, published by Angus and Robertson in 1992.

The collection contains 113 poems from a variety of the author's other poetry collections.

It was the winner of the 1992 NSW Premier's Prize for Poetry,, the 1992 NSW Book of the Year, and the 1993 ALS Gold Medal.

== Contents ==
- "Forbears : Beginning (Forebears : The Map)"
- "Forebears : The Reverend Edward Smith"
- "Forebears : John Teague"
- "Peter Lee and John Cockerill (Forebears : Montfort Lee and Peter Cockerill)"
- "Forebears : Mary Lomax"
- "Forebears : The Man from Richmond"
- "Well Met"
- "Not for the Tourist"
- "The Observer"
- "The Ship Riley"
- "Flowerpiece"
- "A Dream of Summer"
- "Banfield on Dunk Island"
- "The Immigrant"
- "Molly, Who Drowned Herself in the Derwent"
- "Who Praised the Mountain"
- "Wakeful in the Township"
- "A Note to Greece"
- "Lifesaver"
- "News of a Baby"
- "The Soldier in the Park"
- "The Old Sailor"
- "The Promise"
- "The Signpost"
- "The Children March"
- "The Letter"
- "Man at Arms"
- "The Memory"
- "The Survivor"
- "Country Tunes"
- "The Man in the River"
- "The Man at Night"
- "Travellers' Joy"
- "Sleeping Dog"
- "The Sea Captain"
- "My Name is Stanley Montague"
- "Carnival in the Park"
- "A Man on the Road"
- "The Love and Hate of Bells"
- "A Man Returning"
- "Antecedents"
- "Under the Casuarina"
- "Here Lies"
- "Ecce Homo"
- "Suburban Song"
- "After Lunik Two"
- "Anzac Gardens, Southport"
- "A Stranger at the Zoo"
- "Storm Over Stone"
- "Evening : I : The Lover Speaks"
- "Evening : II : The Child Sleeps"
- "Evening : III : The Old Woman Remembers"
- "All Change"
- "Visitors"
- "An Occasion of Parting"
- "Four in the Park"
- "Shellharbour : The Doomcaller"
- "Mr Dove, Retd"
- "Mr and Mrs Beam"
- "The Wind"
- "The Albatross"
- "The Prince of Africa"
- "Paradise"
- "The Old Poet"
- "Every Night"
- "Domestic Flight"
- "Time Frame"
- "The Knitted Shirt"
- "Autobiography"
- "Coming and Going"
- "At the Conference : 1"
- "At the Conference : 2"
- "The Painter"
- "Notice of Proclamation"
- "Early Morning"
- "Today's Portrait"
- "Kauri"
- "Tom"
- "Graziers' Alert"
- "The Jockey's Story"
- "The Poets"
- "Intimations"
- "Suburban Evening"
- "His Life"
- "Visiting Hobart"
- "The End of the Affair"
- "The Party"
- "Security (for Elaine Haxton)"
- "The Musk Duck"
- "Thursday"
- "The Cat"
- "The Short Life of the Little Cat"
- "Peking Circus on Television"
- "Thoughts in an Airplane"
- "Eclipse of the Moon"
- "The Time of Life"
- "November"
- "Personal Notices"
- "Telephone Call"
- "Occasions of Birds"
- "The Optimist"
- "Alone"
- "Together"
- "Counting the Horses"
- "The Death of Butterflies"
- "My Old Friend"
- "The Poet and the Word Processor"
- "Some People in Summer"
- "Young Professional"
- "My Second Cousin"
- "To Stay Alive"
- "We Might Go to Japan"
- "Patrick White, His Day"

== Critical reception ==
In his review of the collection in The Canberra Times critic Geoff Page noted that "Riddell is ahead of her time rather than of it, especially in her preference for breaking up the strict shape of a stanza and varying line length according to the demands of the poem. There is also in this first section a strong lyrical, even rhetorical, impulse which probably goes back to Yeats — a style which is rather out of fashion today and may well attract new readers who are tired of the relative plainness of language and tone which distinguishes much of the best Australian poetry at the moment."

== See also ==
- 1992 in Australian literature
