= Lifesaver (poem) =

1931 poem by Australian poet Elizabeth Riddell

- by Elizabeth Riddell
- Written: 1931
- First published in: The Bulletin
- Country: Australia
- Language: English
- Publication date: 4 March 1931

"Lifesaver" (1931) is a poem by Australian poet Elizabeth Riddell.

It was originally published in The Bulletin on 4 March 1931, as by "Elizabeth Richmond", and was subsequently reprinted in the author's single-author collections and a number of Australian poetry anthologies.

The poem depicts the death of a youth from drowning on an Australian beach as he is returned to shore by lifesavers.

== Critical reception ==
While reviewing the author's poetry collection Poems in 1948 a Bulletin reviewer noted: "The distinguishing qualities of Elizabeth Riddell's Poems (Ure Smith Pty. Ltd.) are a rich and colorful imagery and the sparkle of epigram...It is with some surprise that one realises, among the tropic landscapes or in the sunlight of wit, that almost all the poems are concerned, one way or another, with death. Sometimes, as in "Lifesaver," the theme is stated clearly and sharply."

== Publication history ==
After the poem's initial publication in The Bulletin it was reprinted as follows:

- Australian Poetry 1942 edited by Robert D. Fitzgerald (1942)
- Poems by Elizabeth Riddell (1948)
- An Anthology of Australian Verse edited by George Mackaness (1952)
- New Land, New Language : An Anthology of Australian Verse edited by Judith Wright (1957)
- Forbears by Elizabeth Riddell (1961)
- Silence into Song : An Anthology of Australian Verse edited by Clifford O'Brien (1968)
- From the Midnight Courtyard by Elizabeth Riddell (1989)
- Selected Poems by Elizabeth Riddell (1992)

== See also ==
- 1931 in Australian literature
- 1931 in poetry
