= Ice (Nowra novel) =

Book by Louis Nowra

- First edition
- Author: Louis Nowra
- Language: English
- Publisher: Allen & Unwin
- Publication date: 2008
- Publication place: Australia
- Media type: Print (Paperback)
- Pages: 322
- ISBN: 9781741754834
- Preceded by: Abaza
- Followed by: Into That Forest

Ice is a 2008 novel by Australian novelist Louis Nowra.

== Plot summary ==
A pair of ambitious young British entrepreneurs, Malcolm McEacharn and Andrew McIlwraith, charter a steamer with the aim of towing an iceberg from Antarctica to Sydney. The success of the venture transforms Sydney, and McEacharn who later becomes lord mayor of Melbourne.

== Notes ==
- Dedication: For Mandy

== Reviews ==
Writing in The Australian Book Review Tim Howard noted that "Structuring a novel around one all-encompassing conceit is risky", before commenting that "Nowra is too canny a writer" to just go looking for any ice "metaphorical derivatives." He concluded "Ice is a strange and skilful novel, and, contra its title, so warm, so alive."

Cassandra Golds in Eureka Street found the book to be "a mesmeric proliferation of intense images" with "a plot that pushes over into the Gothic". The novel, she notes: "death, the fanatical resistance to change, the futility of attempts at preservation and, perhaps, the emptiness at the heart of Australian life."

== Awards and nominations ==
- 2009 shortlisted Miles Franklin Literary Award
- 2009 Prime Minister's Literary Awards — Highly Commended
