= Joseph Michelli =

20th and 21st-century American psychologist

- Born: August 11, 1960 (age 66)
- Education: University of Denver; University of Southern California
- Occupations: Author, radio host, and public speaker
- Spouse: Nora Michelli (deceased)

Joseph Michelli (born August 11, 1960) is an American psychologist, organizational consultant, speaker, and author. Since 2004, he has written business books, including The Starbucks Experience, The New Gold Standard, Prescription for Excellence, and Driven to Delight. He is a visiting assistant professor at Campbellsville University.

== Early life and career ==
Michelli received his undergraduate degree from the University of Denver, in psychology, philosophy, and political science and was honored as the 1981 Outstanding Junior Man.

He earned his PhD in 1988 from the University of Southern California, completing his thesis entitled Observational Bias in Spouse Observation Integrating Cognitive and Behavioral Approaches to Marital Distress.

=== Psychology ===
During his undergraduate studies he co-authored an article for Psychology Today entitled Would You Believe a Child Witness. In 1985 Michelli co-authored the research paper A Brief Test for Measuring Malingering in Schizophrenic Individuals that was published in the American Journal of Psychiatry.

Additional academic publications from his studies included articles in the Journal of Pediatric Psychiatry and Law and Human Behavior, as well as a chapter of the third edition for Behavioral Assessment: A Practical Handbook. Michelli is also the author of financial and economics publications.

Michelli worked as a clinical psychologist for the Penrose-St. Francis Health Care System in Colorado during the 1990s. Michelli continued his practice as a psychologist through the late 2000s, working as a forensic psychologist in Colorado and special investigator for public prosecutions. He has also been interviewed as an expert of forensic psychology on CNN.

=== Radio ===
Joseph Michelli began his career in radio as a teenager with KRLN in Canon City, Colorado from 1973 to 1978. He then worked at KWBZ radio in Denver under the pseudonym "The Rock and Roll Kid" as an on-air host from 1979 to 1982. He took an eight-year break from radio while attending graduate and post-graduate school, but returned to radio in 1990. That year Michelli began hosting what would become a nationally syndicated radio show called Wishing You Well on the Business News Network.

As a radio host, he was interviewed for major newspapers to respond to current events involving psychology. The show continued until 1999. Michelli also hosted The Joseph Michelli Show on KVOR in Colorado Springs, CO, a daily 2-hour afternoon drive talk show that ran from 1997 to 2007. Due to his work as an author, as of 2007 Michelli would host the show over the telephone on the road while doing book signings, speaking engagements, and other events. He left the show in June 2007.

Upon his departure from the radio business it was claimed he had "raised the talk show bar" in Colorado, as Michelli left to work full-time on his books. Michelli's commentary on social issues was sometimes the cause of controversy. The group Media Matters stated that he had failed to deter frequent callers from making insensitive remarks about homosexuals, and had allowed a guest host for his show to make similar remarks.

=== Consulting ===
Michelli is also a consultant that works with companies on customer retention strategies.

== Books ==
=== Books on corporate cultures ===
Michelli has written or co-written a number of books on the culture of individual businesses.

- When Fish Fly: Lessons for Creating a Vital and Energized Workplace (2004) on the Pike Place Fish Market in Seattle, Washington, co-written with the business's owner, John Yokoyama. The Chicago Tribune reviewed the book and stated that the two authors "combine for a number of 'A-ha' moments".
- The Starbucks Experience: 5 Principles for Turning Ordinary Into Extraordinary (2006), on coffee chain Starbucks. This reached number three on the Wall Street Journal business books bestseller list.
- The New Gold Standard: 5 Leadership Principles for Creating a Legendary Customer Experience Courtesy of The Ritz-Carlton Hotel Company (2008) on the Ritz-Carlton Hotel Company.
- Prescription for Excellence (2011) is about the University of California, Los Angeles health system.ResultSource was paid to make Prescription for Excellence a bestseller, with the UCLA Health System buying copies of the book and sending them to hospital CEOs, The book reached number four on the New York Times business hardcover list, as well as number one the New York Times hardcover advice best-seller list. In its second week, "sales plunged 96%" and it dropped off the list.
- The Zappos Experience: 5 Principles to Inspire, Engage, and Wow (2011) focuses on on-line shoe retailer Zappos.com.
- Driven to Delight: Delivering World-Class Customer Experience the Mercedes-Benz Way (2015), on automobile manufacturer Mercedes-Benz. The book appeared on the Wall Street Journal hardcover business best-sellers list.
- Leading the Starbucks Way: 5 Principles for Connecting with Your Customers, Your Products, and Your People (2013) is a second volume about Starbucks.
- 'The MindChamps Way: How to Turn An Idea Into A Global Movement (2019), on Singapore-based early learning brand MindChamps.
- The Airbnb Way (2019) on Airbnb.
- Customer Magic (2023) on Macquarie Telecom Group operations.

=== Other books ===
- Humor, Play, and Laughter: Stress-Proofing Life with Your Kids (1998) on the role of humor in the context of parenting.
- Stronger Through Adversity (2021) examines general leadership practices across industries around the structure of four key themes—Set the Foundation, Build Connections, Move with Purpose, and Harness Change.

== Personal life ==
Michelli married Nora Leigh Smith, with whom he had two children, Joseph Andrew and Fiona. Nora died from breast cancer on February 11, 2013.
