= Butterfly Island =

Television series

- Written by: David Phillips
- Directed by: Howard Rubie
- Starring: Grigor Taylor; Mouche Phillips; Penne Hackforth-Jones
- Country of origin: Australia
- Original language: English
- No. of episodes: 8 (season one); 22 (season two); 16 (season three)

Production
- Producer: Stanley Walsh
- Running time: 30 mins

Original release
- Network: ABC (series one); Seven (series two)
- Release: 1985 – 1987

Butterfly Island is an Australian children's drama television series. The first season cost $1.6 million, the second $3.2 million. This was the first mainstream Australian TV show where an Asian actor, David Phu An Chiem was given a lead role.

The first eight part season aired on the ABC in 1985. It followed the Wilson family who run a holiday resort. Also featured are a Vietnamese refugee and a crooked property developer. The second 22-part season moved to Channel 7 in 1987. A planned third season was axed in 1987 after a casting dispute with the Actors' Equity over the use of an American actress. The series was revived in 1991.

== Cast ==
=== Main / regular ===
- Grigor Taylor as Charlie Wilson
- Mouche Phillips as Jackie Wilson
- Penne Hackforth-Jones as Mary Travers
- Mark Kounnas as Greg Wilson
- Kerri Sackville as Sally Wilson (season 1)
- Phu An Chiem as Vo Diem (season 1)
- Vincent Ball as Sergeant Connolly (season 1)
- Gerry Sont as Bob Gallio (season 1)
- Peter Mochrie as Sergio Gallio (season 1)
- Neil Fitzpatrick as David Lee (season 1)

=== Recurring ===
- Peter Whitford as Fred
