= David Chiem =

Vietnamese entrepreneur

David Chiem is a Vietnamese-born Australian entrepreneur, author and actor. He is the Founder, Executive Chairman and Group CEO of the MindChamps group of companies, which comprises MindChamps PreSchool, Singapore's No. 1 premium preschool with a market share of 38.5%, MindSpace, an after school and enrichment academy, and MindChamps Early Intervention & Therapy. MindChamps PreSchool was the first early childhood educator to list on the Singapore Exchange (SGX). MindChamps has over 131 centres globally.

He is the first Asian to have a major role in a mainstream Australian television drama series, Butterfly Island. He has written a number of books, one of them, Only the Heart, has been used as a set text in Australian schools.

== Early life ==
David and his family fled Vietnam and arrived in Australia as refugees in 1978.

On his first day in school, he couldn't speak a word of English and he remembers been called stupid by another student, because he didn't understand the teacher when she asked him for his name. This experience, and the fact that education was highly prized by his family, would have a major impact on his career choices.

After his acting studies at Theatre Nepean (Western Sydney University), David went on to study film at the University of Technology Sydney where he received a BA in communications, and earned a master's degree in film-making from the Australian Film, Television and Radio School (AFTRS).

== Career ==
When he was 14 years old, he was selected to play a starring role on "Butterfly Island" and became the first Asian to be given a starring role on mainstream Australian television drama series.

While studying the craft of filmmaking, he had an epiphany. He became fascinated by the idea that there could be another way of teaching children. They faced far greater demands on their education than previous generations, so, instead of rote learning, drilling and memorising content, why not help children to understand how to learn and more importantly develop the mindset of enthusiastic, life-long learners?

As a result, he founded MindChamps, a ground-breaking early learning educational organisation.

MindChamps' approach to education is based on strategies derived from research in ‘the 4 Domains’ of Education, Psychology Neuroscience and Theatre. Since its inception as an education research centre in Sydney in 1998, MindChamps has grown from point zero to achieving the number one brand position in the highly competitive Singapore premium preschool space, with a market share of 38.5%.

== Published books ==
David is also a published author, and has written two novels with Brian Caswell, Only the Heart and The Full Story. The books have been nominated or shortlisted for a number of Australian literary awards, including New South Wales Premier's Literary Awards. Only the Heart has been used as a set text for many years in Australian schools.

Other books by Chiem include the parenting and educational book Deeper than the Ocean, and its follow-up The Art of Communicating With Your Child as well as Pre-school Parenting Secrets – Talking with the Sky. He also co-authored The 3-Mind Revolution, an educational psychology book with Caswell.

== Awards and accolades ==
In recognition of his achievements as a business leader and entrepreneur, David Chiem has received many awards and accolades over the years.

- In 2008, he received the Top Entrepreneur-Entrepreneur of the Year Award by Rotary-ASME.
- In 2010, he received the Outstanding Entrepreneur Award at the Asia Pacific Enterprise Awards
- In 2014, The Peak Magazine recognised David Chiem as one of ten outstanding individuals to be in their year-end power list.
- In 2019, David was named Entrepreneur of the Year by the Australian Chamber of Commerce, Singapore (AustCham).
- In 2022, David was awarded “ASIA’S MOST INFLUENTIAL ENTREPRENEUR” at the 2022 Fortune Times Awards Ceremony.
- In December 2024, David was recognised in the Singapore Business Review Management Excellence Awards as Innovator of the Year for his contributions in ‘transforming education globally with ground-breaking innovations including the revolutionary 3-Mind Education Model, an Education Methodology that has attained Patent Status in the US, UK and Australia, the MindChamps Reading Programme and many more’.
- In 2026, David Chiem was conferred a Doctor of Letters (honoris causa) by Western Sydney University in recognition of his contributions to education, the arts and society.
