= The Golden Age (Nowra play) =

First edition (publ. Currency Press, Sydney)

The Golden Age is a 1985 play written by Australian writer and playwright Louis Nowra. It is based on the story that Nowra heard from an academic about "a strange group of people in the wilds of South-West Tasmania just before World War II".

== Plot summary ==
Francis Morris, a young, enthusiastic engineer from Melbourne, and his wealthy friend Peter, a geologist from Hobart, depart on an endeavour of exploring the wilds of Tasmania. After becoming lost in the wilderness, they stumble upon a group of people who have been living in isolation since the mid-19th century.

Because of this social seclusion the tribe has developed its own unique language and culture constructed upon the social conventions of Regency England. Upon returning to Hobart, the pair informs Peter's father Dr William Archer of the group, and he arranges for their integration back into civilization.

The group does not integrate into society well in relation to their mental and physical incapacities. They are seen as "an endorsement of Nazi beliefs" and, as a result, the tribe is imprisoned in an asylum. In the meantime, with the advent of World War II, Peter and Francis are sent to Europe to fight. In the years that follow, one by one each member of the group dies, with the exception of Betsheb, leaving her suffering "profound depressions" and in an unfit condition to be released, so for another year she remains at New Norfolk Asylum, during which time she is given shock treatment.

Francis is eventually sent back to Australia. Having been disillusioned and traumatized by the events of the war, as well as resentful of the Australian attitude towards our history and mistakes, Francis elects to live with Betsheb once more in the wilderness, taking her back home.

== Themes ==
The play addresses many themes and ideas. The lost tribe has been seen as an allegory for the Aboriginal Tasmanians, and indeed all Aboriginal and first-nations people. The play also addresses the basis, and the flaws, of the Australian culture.

Many of its themes are consistent with Tasmanian Gothic literature and it is considered a good modern example of the genre. It has been described as one of Nowra's great theatrical achievements.

== Productions ==
The Golden Age premiered in February 1985, presented by the Playbox Theatre Company at the Studio, Victorian Arts Centre in Melbourne. Subsequent productions include Sydney's Nimrod Theatre Company which opened at the Seymour Centre in August 1987, and a Sydney Theatre Company revival which opened in January 2016.

In 1988, The Golden Age was performed at the Taki Rua Depot Theatre in Wellington, New Zealand. The cast included Dame Kate Harcourt, Dulcie Smart and Helen Moulder.
