= Cosi (film) =

- Theatrical film poster
- Directed by: Mark Joffe
- Screenplay by: Louis Nowra
- Based on: Così by Louis Nowra
- Produced by: Richard Brennan; Timothy White
- Starring: Ben Mendelsohn; Barry Otto; Toni Collette; Rachel Griffiths; Aden Young; Jacki Weaver; Pamela Rabe; Kerry Walker; Tony Llewellyn-Jones; Paul Chubb; Colin Hay; David Wenham; Colin Friels
- Cinematography: Ellery Ryan
- Edited by: Nicholas Beauman
- Music by: Stephen Endelman
- Production companies: Miramax Films; Australian Film Finance Corporation; Smiley Films; Meridian Films
- Distributed by: Roadshow Entertainment
- Release date: 28 March 1996
- Running time: 100 minutes
- Country: Australia
- Language: English
- Budget: A$3.5 million
- Box office: A$2,896,980 (Australia)

Cosi is a 1996 Australian comedy drama film directed by Mark Joffe. Louis Nowra wrote both the screenplay and the 1992 play on which it was based. The story is loosely based on Nowra's own experience at producing Trial by Jury at Plenty Mental Hospital in suburban Melbourne in 1971.

== Plot ==
Lewis Riley, lacking direction, has difficulty holding down a job. He applies for a job as a director/drama teacher at a mental hospital, where he is expected to produce a variety show aimed at the inmates' abilities. During auditions, manic-depressive Roy overwhelms the pushover Lewis, with Roy selecting the six cast members: Ruth, a suicidal woman whose rendition of “I’m So Excited” is dejected; Cherry, a woman prone to false claims of sexual harassment who lusts after Lewis; Julie, a recovering drug addict, the only one who can actually sing; Doug, a cat-burning pyromaniac; Henry, who is completely submissive to Roy; and Zac, an accordion player who aspires to play Ride of the Valkyries wearing a horned Viking helmet.

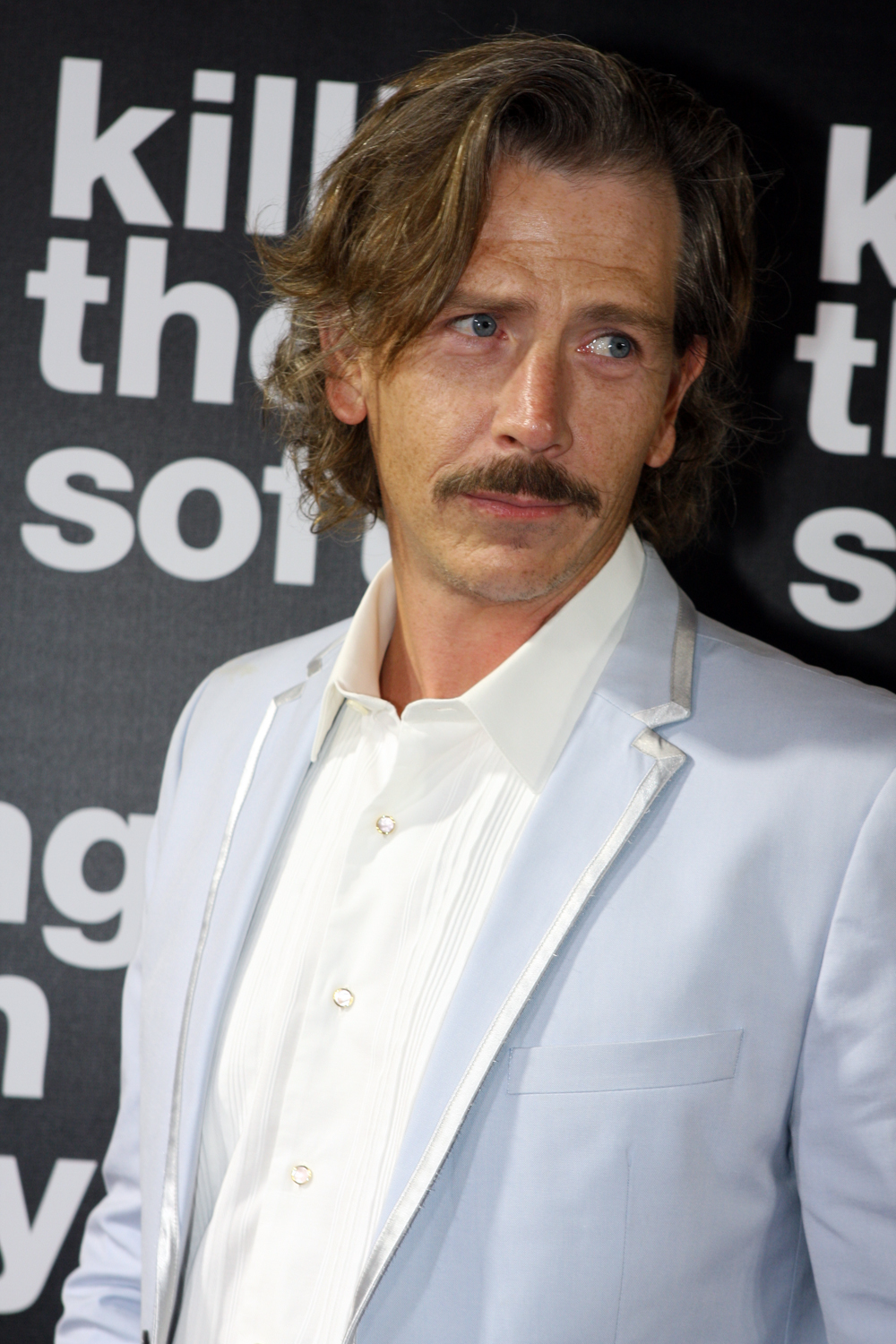
Ben Mendelsohn plays Lewis Riley, who applies for a job as a director / drama teacher at a mental hospital to produce a variety show.

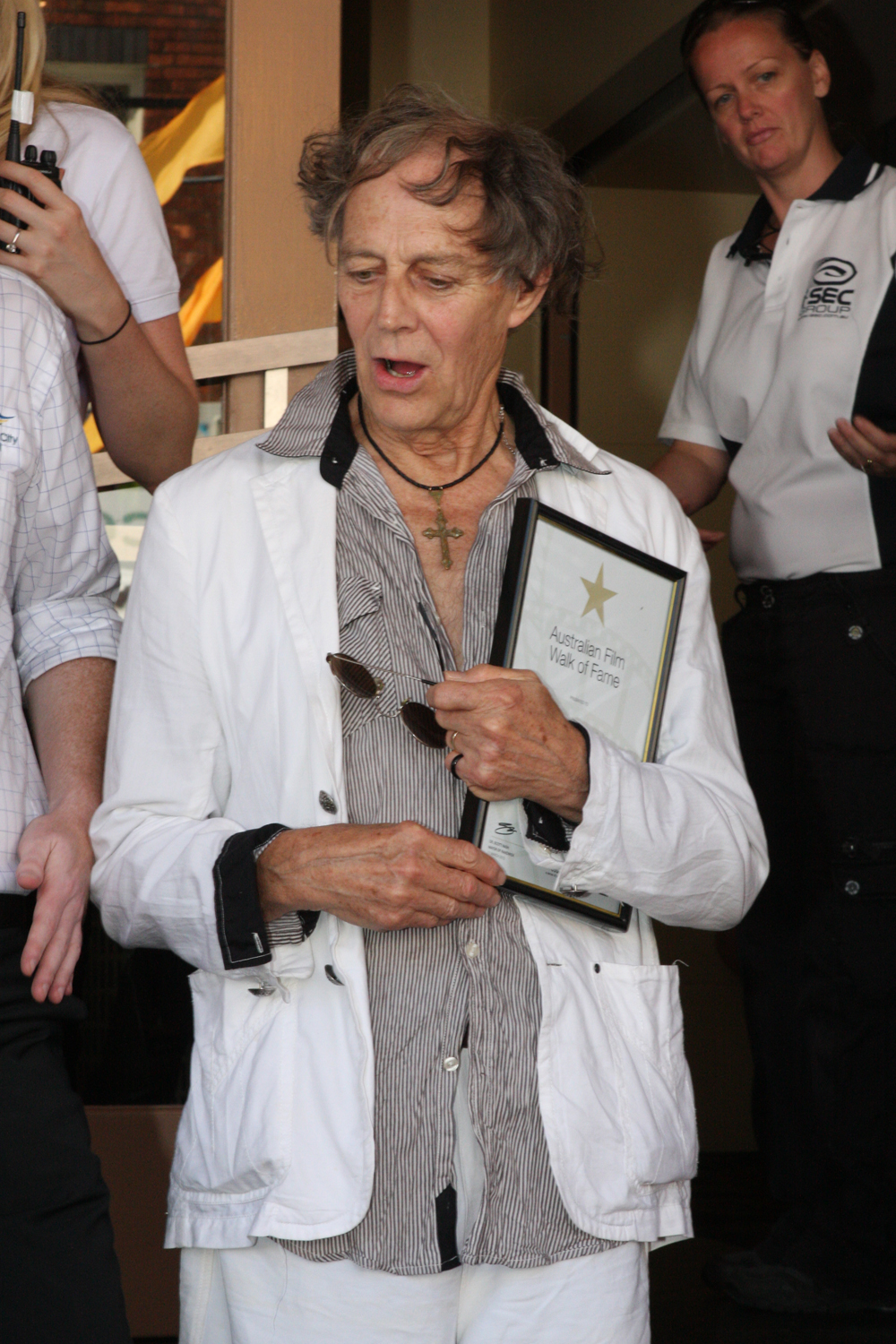
Barry Otto plays Roy, a mental patient who bullies Lewis into directing a production of the Mozart opera Così Fan Tutte.

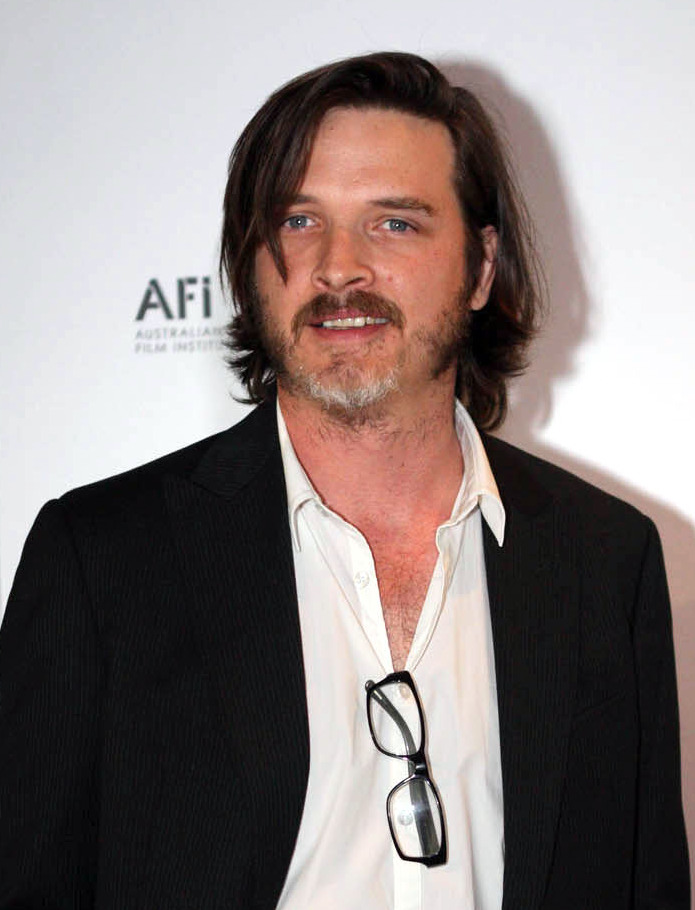
Aden Young plays Nick Ward, Lewis’s best friend who makes a $50 bet that Lucy will not remain faithful to Lewis.

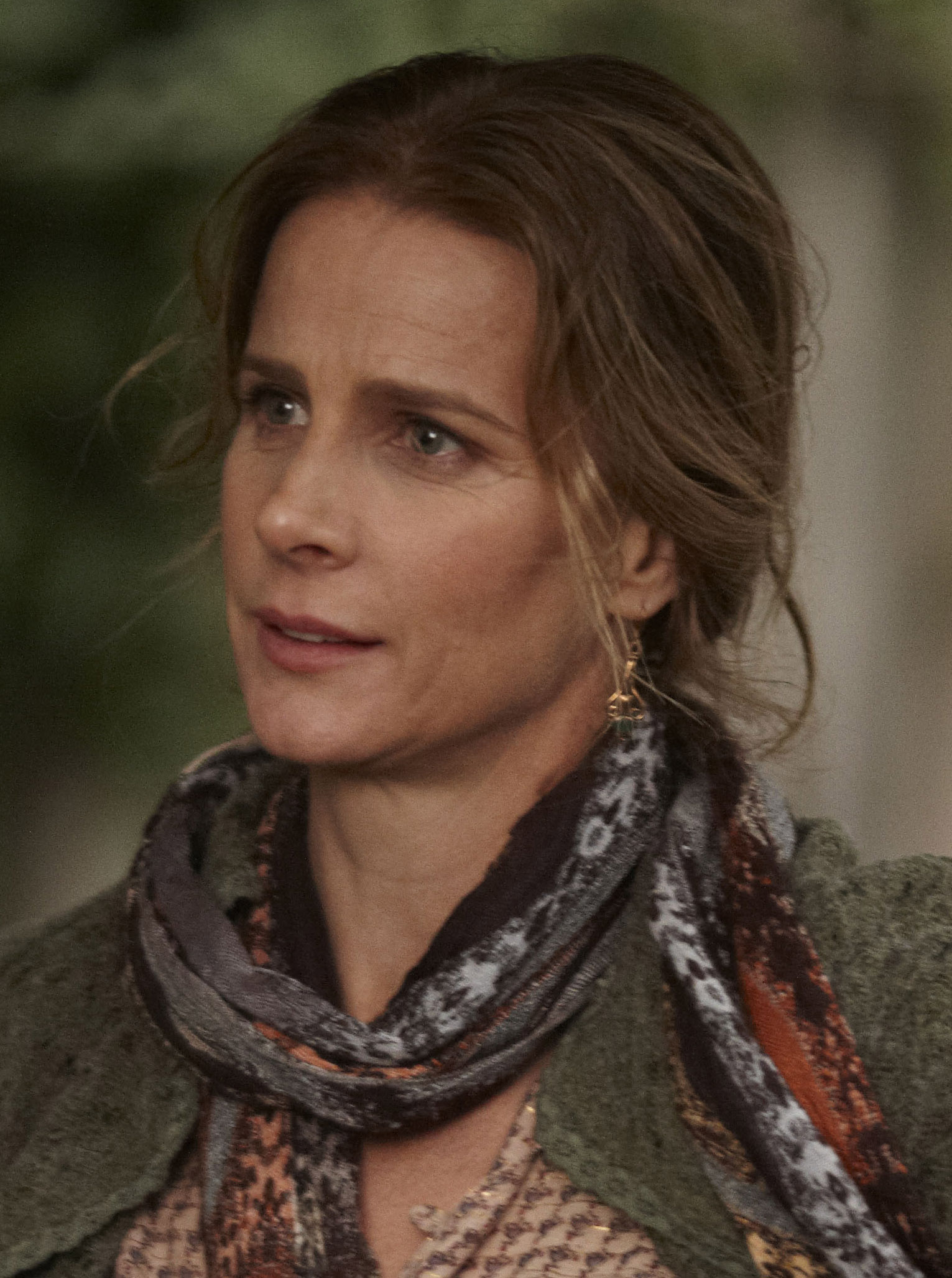
Rachel Griffiths plays Lucy, Lewis's girlfriend, who Nick tries to seduce to win his bet, mimicking the theme of Cosi Fan Tutte.

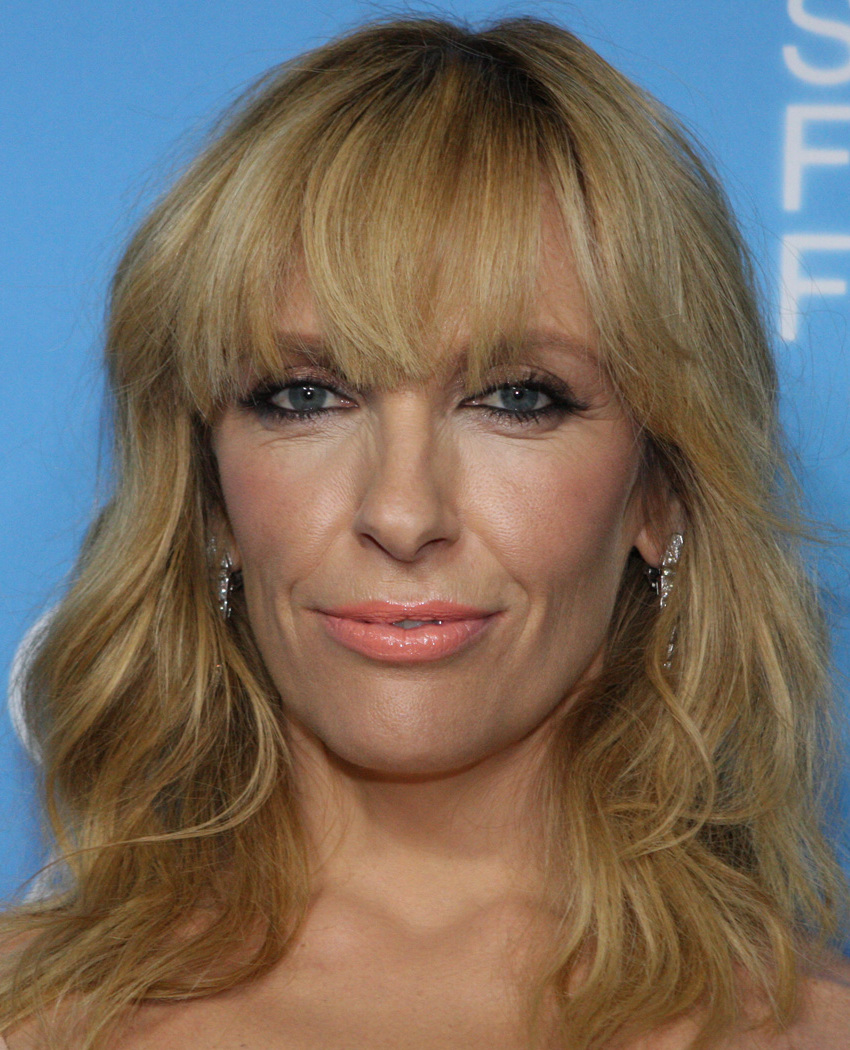
Toni Collette plays Julie, a recovering drug addict, the only patient who can actually sing, who tempts Lewis's own fidelity.

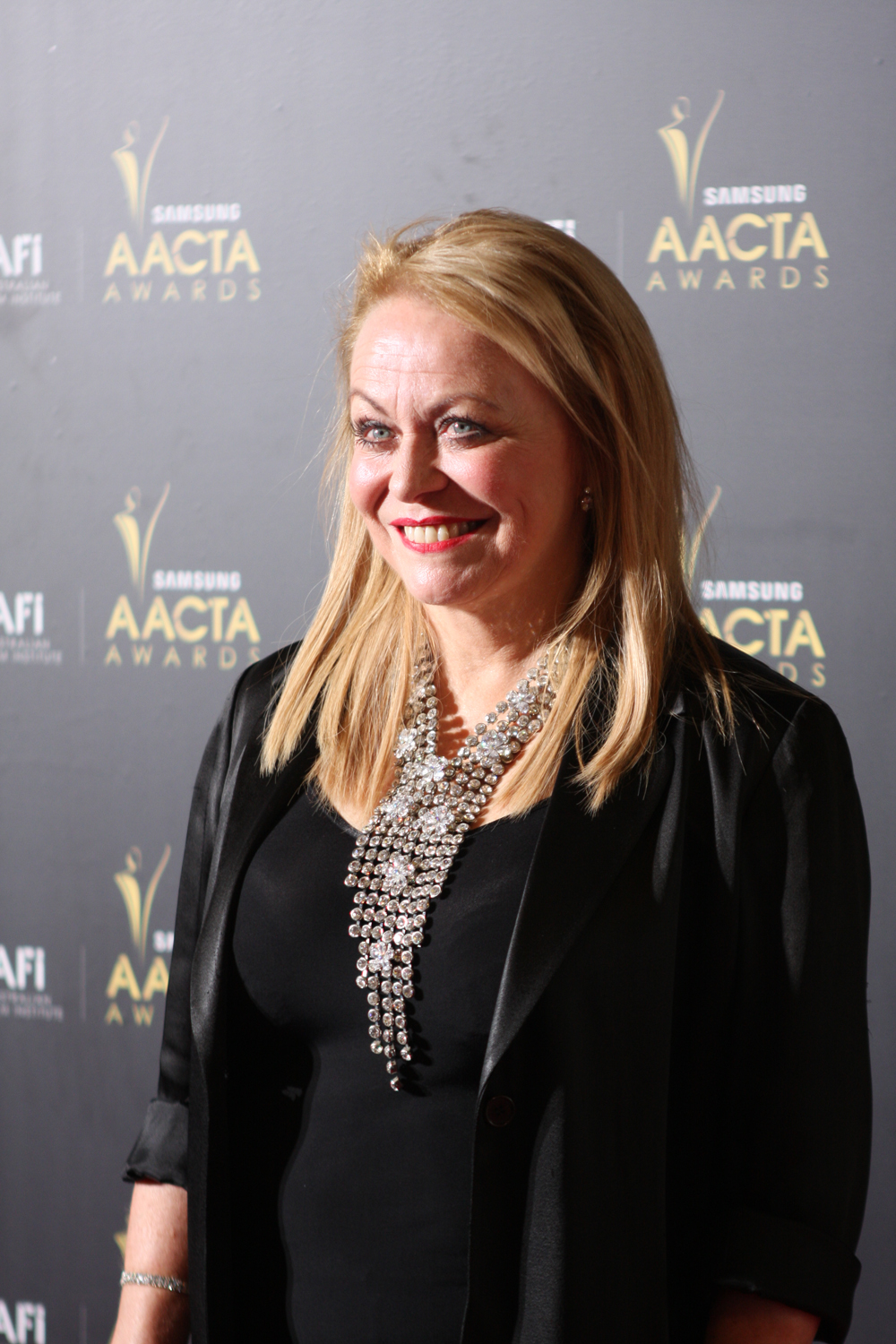
Jacki Weaver plays Cherry, a patient prone to false claims of sexual harassment, who lusts after Lewis.

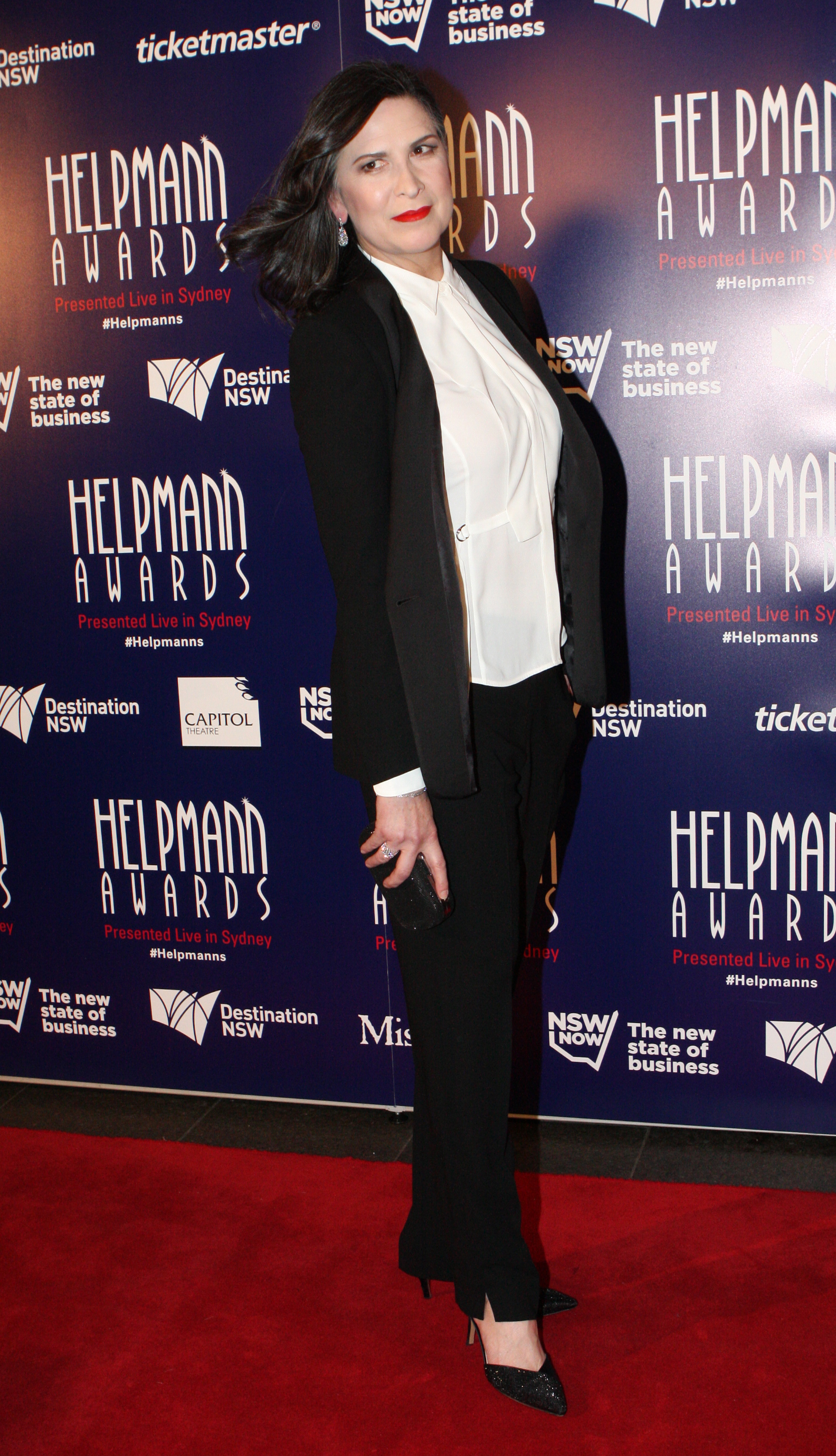
Pamela Rabe plays Ruth, a suicidal woman who learns to bond with her fellow inmate performers.

Roy bullies Lewis into directing a production of the Mozart opera Così fan tutte, despite its being elaborate, in Italian, and requiring operatic voices. Errol, a male nurse, suggests to Lewis the way to do it—have the “actors” act out the storyline in translation, set to a background recording of the opera. Lewis grows resourceful in “herding cats”, dealing with the idiosyncrasies of each patient, while developing a genuine attachment for each. Doug burns down the theater, leading to Lewis getting fired. Nevertheless, the patients plead with Lewis to carry on with the project secretly. Lewis agrees to do so, without pay, also taking on acting in Doug’s role, since Doug is now in a locked ward. The patients work together to clean up and transform an old laundry on the hospital premises into a suitable theater and rehearse furtively at night. They must also pretend to rehearse for a variety show during the day under the supervision of an administrator.

The theme of Così fan tutte – two friends make a bet as to whether each of their beloveds will stay faithful to them if they approach them in disguise as a test – is explored in Lewis' personal life. Lewis' relationship with his law student girlfriend Lucy, already under pressure, is strained by a friend, Nick. Nick proposes a $50 bet that Lucy will not remain faithful to Lewis. Although Lewis rejects the bet, Nick proceeds behind his back.

Lewis’s own fidelity is tested when he is attracted to Julie; they kiss, but Lewis immediately draws a boundary. Doug escapes from the locked ward and comes looking for Lewis at home. When Doug alarms Lucy in the bathtub, Nick is the only one there to protect her. Lewis arrives in time to note Lucy’s scantily-clad state and Nick by her side. After calming everyone down, Nick takes Doug back to the hospital. Doug cunningly convinces the hospital attendant that Lewis is the escaped inmate; Lewis is sedated and locked in the ward instead. The next morning, Errol, who has been looking the other way on the Cosi production, finds Doug and has Lewis released.

On the night of the play, Lucy initially chooses to attend a Legal Aid ball, with Nick as substitute escort, rather than attend the play. A bitter Lewis hands Lucy a $50 bill and tells her to give it to Nick.

At the last moment, Roy has stage fright and will not get out of bed. Lewis pushes Roy, reminding him of his passion for the production. Instead of a variety show, the audience—including dignitaries—is surprised by an imaginative and charming production of Così fan tutte. When Henry freezes, Julie performs a show-stopping rendition of Stand By Me. At mid-production, Lucy goes backstage to let Lewis know she has decided his production is important. Nick has explained to her the meaning behind the $50. Lewis accepts her assurance that she has not cheated on him. When Nick turns up, Lewis ends their friendship. Julie informs Lewis that she is being discharged from the hospital, and Lewis offers his continuing friendship. The cast gathers around Lewis to express their appreciation for his commitment to them. Lewis commits to come back next year for another production.

At the end of the credits, Zac appears, wearing a horned Viking helmet, playing Ride of the Valkyries.

== Cast ==
- Ben Mendelsohn as Lewis Riley
- Barry Otto as Roy
- Toni Collette as Julie
- Rachel Griffiths as Lucy
- Aden Young as Nick Ward
- Colin Friels as Errol Greer
- Jacki Weaver as Cherry
- Pamela Rabe as Ruth
- Paul Chubb as Henry
- Colin Hay as Zac
- David Wenham as Doug
- Tony Llewellyn-Jones as Jeff Kirner
- Kerry Walker as Sandra Russell
- Robin Ramsay as Health Minister
- Dan Wyllie as Closed Ward Nurse
- Anita Hegh as Waitress
- Paul Mercurio as Mental Patient (uncredited)
- Greta Scacchi as Mental Patient (uncredited)

Mendelsohn, Otto, and Wenham reprised their roles from the original 1992 stage production.

== Production ==
Louis Nowra wrote both the screenplay and the play on which it was based. The story is loosely based on Nowra's own experience at producing Trial by Jury at Plenty Mental Hospital in suburban Melbourne in 1971.

Cosi was directed by Mark Joffe and produced by Richard Brennan and Timothy White. Executive producers were Phaedon Vass, Bob Weinstein, and Harvey Weinstein. Cinematography was by Ellery Ryan, Nicholas Beauman edited the film, and Stephen Endelman composed the score. Production design was by Chris Kennedy.

The film underwent pre-production in November 1994-January 1995. Shooting took place between January and March 1995, followed by post-production between March and September 1995. Production was completed in 1995.

The film had a budget of $3.5 million. The film was filmed in and around Sydney's Rozelle Hospital.

Bruno Lawrence was originally cast in the role of Errol, the security guard, but during shooting he was taken to the hospital suffering from chest pains and was diagnosed with inoperable lung cancer. Colin Friels took over the role of Errol. Lawrence died a few months later, on 10 June 1995. The closing credits of Cosi include an onscreen dedication to Lawrence.

Cosi's U.S. distribution was handled by Miramax Films. Cosi was the first Australian film to receive major pre-production investment by Miramax (a Disney subsidiary since 1993), with the studio having previously handled international distribution for several other Australian films. Their next major investment in the South Pacific area came in 1997, with the New Zealand film Heaven, which included some American actors and was mostly funded by them.

== Critical reception ==
In 1996, Cosi was the 3rd most popular Australian film at the Australian Box Office. As of 2010, Cosi ranked 71 on the list of Top 100 Australian feature films of all time as compiled by Screen Australia.

David Stratton, writing in Variety, described Cosi as "fast, funny and cleverly acted". He also said it was "warm, generous, sentimental and expert entertainment." The curator at Australian Screen Online said it "has a likeable humour, appealing characters and a compassionate heart. It's not really about mental illness so much as a tribute to the healing power of performance, and the theatre in general."

Not all reviews were positive. James Berardinelli described Cosi as "a half-baked amalgamation of A Midwinter's Tale and Shine, and doesn't excel as either a comedy or a drama." Cinephilia described Cosi as "a concatenation of caricatures in a predictable story of plucky determination and treacly redemption."

=== Accolades ===
Award	Category	Subject	Result
AACTA Awards (1996 AFI Awards)	Best Adapted Screenplay	Louis Nowra	Won
AACTA Awards (1996 AFI Awards)	Best Supporting Actor	Barry Otto	Nominated
AACTA Awards (1996 AFI Awards)	Best Editing	Nicholas Beauman	Nominated

== Box office ==
Cosi grossed $2,896,980 at the box office in Australia and was the third highest-grossing Australian film of the year behind Babe and Shine.

Cosi did not fare well critically or commercially in the United States, screening for less than two weeks between 11 and 24 April 1997.

== Home media ==
In the United States, the film was released on VHS in December 1997 by Disney's Buena Vista Home Entertainment, who handled all other Miramax home video releases. Buena Vista Home Entertainment later released the film on DVD in 2003. The film's Australian home media releases were originally handled by Village Roadshow Entertainment, with local distributor Umbrella Entertainment later reissuing it on Blu-ray.

The film's international rights are still owned by Miramax, even though their rights to several other foreign films have since expired. In 2010, Miramax was sold by Disney to private equity firm Filmyard Holdings, who in turn sold it to Qatari company beIN Media Group in March 2016. In April 2020, ViacomCBS (now known as Paramount Skydance) acquired the rights to Miramax's film library, after buying a 49% stake in the studio from beIN. Outside of Australia, the film has been distributed by Paramount Pictures since April 2020. Paramount Home Entertainment reissued the film on DVD in the U.S. on August 10, 2021, with this being one of many Miramax titles that they reissued around this time.

== See also ==
- List of Australian films
- List of films shot in Sydney
