= Jane, Interlinear and Other Poems =

1992 Australian poetry collection by Robert Harris

- Author: Robert Harris
- Language: English
- Genre: Poetry collection
- Publisher: Paper Bark Press
- Publication date: 1992
- Publication place: Australia
- Media type: Print
- Pages: 135 pp
- Awards: 1992 Victorian Premier's Prize for Poetry, winner
- ISBN: 0958780161

Jane, Interlinear and Other Poems is a collection of poems by Australian poet Robert Harris, published by Paper Bark Press in 1992.

The collection contains 81 poems. Several had been previously published in Australian literary magazines and other poetry anthologies. The bulk of the poems were published here for the first time.

It was the winner of the 1992 Victorian Premier's Prize for Poetry.

== Contents ==
- "Seven Songs for Sydney : Chorus for Two Voices"
- Seven Songs for Sydney
  - "1 : The 48th Anniversary"
  - "2 : Mareeba and Chief Petty Officer Jones"
  - "Chorus of Grandmothers' Handbags"
  - "3 : The Voice of the Dream of Those Who Pass it On"
  - "4 : Captain Burnett R.A.N."
  - "5 : Everything Sang"
  - "6 : They Assume the Survivors are Australian"
  - "Chorus of Rumoured Survivors"
  - "7 : Rust No More Germane than Novelty"
- "Jane, Interlinear : The Deer at Bradgate"
- "Jane, Interlinear : Speed Reading"
- "Jane, Interlinear : The Story's Gate"
- "Jane, Interlinear : 'Before I Went into Germany'"
- "Jane, Interlinear : Music Practice"
- "Jane, Interlinear : Tower Green, Cartoon"
- "Jane, Interlinear : Inter Vivos (1)"
- "Jane, Interlinear : Inter Vivos (2)"
- "Jane, Interlinear : Newhall"
- "Jane, Interlinear : King Edward VI, His Devise"
- "Jane, Interlinear : Colours, Freely"
- "Jane, Interlinear : That Fatal Spring"
- "Jane, Interlinear : The Structure of Blame (Jane, Interlinear : The Structure of Blame)"
- "Jane, Interlinear : The Proclamation of Sovereignty"
- "Jane, Interlinear : William Paulet Visits Twice"
- "Jane, Interlinear : Pictures (1)"
- "Jane, Interlinear : Pictures (2)"
- "Jane, Interlinear : The Pikeman's Story, Evening"
- "Jane, Interlinear : Narration"
- "Jane, Interlinear : 'Not Much to Hide'"
- "Jane, Interlinear : Speculations (1)"
- "Jane, Interlinear : Speculations (2)"
- "Jane, Interlinear : In Anne Boleyn's Garden"
- "Jane, Interlinear : Of These, Which?"
- "Jane, Interlinear : Dr Feckenham"
- "Jane, Interlinear : Apocrypha (1)"
- "Jane, Interlinear : Apocrypha (2)"
- "Jane, Interlinear : Hand in Hand"
- "Jane, Interlinear : Elegy with Unknown Artist"
- "Jane, Interlinear : Arrival in England"
- Notations of N.Y.C.
  - "Come Flying (Continental)"
  - "South Ferry"
  - "Liberty Island"
  - "Rock Around and Round"
  - "The North American Color-Field"
- "Forests and Rivers"
- "The Day (an Eschatology for E.G. Whitlam)"
- "Cane-Field Sunday 1959"
- "Metropolitan Scenes"
- "The Sculpture 'Vault' in Batman Park"
- "Class of Ninety One (for Melville High School)"
- "The Sleeping Car Trick"
- "Past Resile"
- "Ashbery and O'Hara, or the Letter X at Play : Ashbery"
- "Ashbery and O'Hara, or the Letter X at Play : O'Hara"
- "The Quote from Cursor Mundi (for John Forbes)"
- "Studying Ezekiel"
- "Cage"
- "Ezekiel's Music"
- "Construction with Dying Bee"
- "Ezekiel in Leicester"
- "The Poetry Cats of Twenty Years"
- "Antarctica (i.m. Stephen Murray-Smith)"
- "Denise's Story Against Herself"
- "Memoir of Cherry Bomb and the Stomach Pump"
- "Silver Buckle"
- "His Secret Erotic Poetry"
- "I'm Overweight"
- "A Summer Has Made this Impossible"
- "The Game"
- "Sing This Over a Hill"
- "Looking at the You Yangs"
- "You Will Thicken"
- "More than Mere Sex"
- "If Your Memory Serves You Well"
- "Undressing the Ghosts"
- "Cathy Flies Out"
- "Sir Thos. Chaloner (the Elder) Naps"
- "Lord Guildford Dudley, His Madrigal"
- "Biographer"
- "Letter to John Dudley"

== Critical reception ==
In a short review of the collection for The Age newspaper Gary Catalano noted that it "radiates the sort of defiance one has come to expect of this poet on the basis of his four previous collections."

== See also ==
- 1992 in Australian literature
