= The Children March =

Poem by Elizabeth Riddell

- by Elizabeth Riddell
- Country: Australia
- Language: English
- Publisher: Australian Poetry 1943 edited by H. M. Green
- Publication date: 1944

"The Children March" is a poem by Australian poet Elizabeth Riddell.

It was first published in Australian Poetry 1943 edited by H. M. Green in 1944, and later in several of the author's poetry collections and a number of other Australian poetry anthologies.

== Outline ==
The poem begins "The children of the world are on the march" referring to all children everywhere losing their innocence and their childhoods due to the war. The poem was written during World War II.

== Critical reception ==
In his commentary on the poem in 60 Classic Australian Poems Geoff Page noted “'The Children March' is not especially typical of Riddell's poetry; it is an example of her craftsmanship at its best and a poem of powerful emotional impact"'.

== Further publications ==
After its initial publication in the Australian Poetry 1943 anthology in 1944, the poem was reprinted as follows:

- Forbears by Elizabeth Riddell, Angus and Robertson, 1961
- We Took Their Orders and Are Dead : An Anti-War Anthology edited by Shirley Cass, Ros Cheney, David Malouf, and Michael Wilding, Ure Smith, 1971
- The Collins Book of Australian Poetry edited by Rodney Hall, Collins, 1981
- Selected Poems by Elizabeth Riddell, Angus and Robertson, 1992
- 60 Classic Australian Poems edited by Geoff Page, University of NSW Press, 2009
- The Puncher & Wattmann Anthology of Australian Poetry edited by John Leonard, Puncher & Wattmann, 2009

== See also ==
- 1944 in poetry
- 1944 in literature
- 1944 in Australian literature
- Australian literature
