= Summer of the Aliens =

- Written by: Louis Nowra
- Characters: Lewis, Dulcie, Mr Pisano, Uncle Richard, Norma, Eric, Mr Irvin, Mrs Irvin, Grandma, Bev, Brian
- Genre: Drama
- Setting: Melbourne, Australia

Premiere
- Date: 12 March 1992
- Place: Russell Street Theatre, Melbourne

Summer of the Aliens is a semi-autobiographical, 1990s play written by Louis Nowra. The play is an often humorous, unsentimental coming-of-age story about a 14-year-old boy, Lewis, who is obsessed with flying saucers, UFO abductions and imagines aliens are invading the earth.

It was first written as a radio play and won the 1990 Prix Italia for Fiction (as an ABC radio play). It was first broadcast on 30 October 1989. Louis Nowra adapted it for the stage. The version published by Currency Press is for the theatre.

== Synopsis ==
Lewis lives in a housing commission suburb on the outskirts of the city, Melbourne with his single mother, sister, and grandmother, who is rapidly approaching senility. Lewis' obsessions with aliens masks his own adolescent confusion about the changing world around him. His best friend is local tomboy, Dulcie, a spirited though troubled young woman who has her own confusions about womanhood. Meanwhile, Lewis' friend, Brian, can only think of losing his virginity.

Lewis world changes forever when his itinerant father, Eric, suddenly returns home, and Lewis discovers Dulcie's heartbreaking secret. The three-act play is set in 1962, the year of the Cuban Missile Crisis.

== Setting ==
The Currency Press publication of the script states the play is set in "A Housing Commission Estate in the paddocks or northern Melbourne in the early sixties".

In the first scene, the narrator states the action takes place in the summer of 1962. Also in a foreword to the published play, the author states:

"The landscape of the play is recognisably Fawkner, a suburb to the north of Melbourne."

Louis Nowra grew up in Fawkner, as he states in his memoir, "The Twelfth of Never".

== Characters ==
The full list of characters are as follows:

- Narrator – the older Lewis
- Lewis – 14 years old
- Dulcie – Lewis' best friend, 14 years old
- Norma – Lewis' mother
- Eric – Lewis' father
- Uncle Richard – Lewis' uncle
- Bev – Lewis' sister
- Grandma – Lewis' grandmother
- Mr Irvin – Dulcie's stepfather
- Mrs Irvin – Dulcie's mother
- Beatrice – a Dutch girl
- Mr Pisano – the postman
- Brian – Lewis' friend
- Japanese woman.

== Structure ==
The play is in three acts, with act one consisting of nine scenes, act two made up of 11 scenes and the final act comprising eight scenes. Summer of the Aliens can be described as a "memory play" in the tradition of Tennessee Williams' The Glass Menagerie, as the narrator's recollections of his adolescence are the basis for the action of the play. In various productions of Summer of the Aliens, both the adult Lewis (the narrator) and young Lewis can be seen on stage at the same time, and at the end both the adult Lewis and young Lewis briefly interact with each other.

== Themes ==
The play largely focuses on adolescent issues, but is meant for an adult audience. Themes include sexuality, gender, prejudice, cultural identity and the relationship between memory and personal identity. The latter theme is evidenced by Eric, the protagonist's father, whose recollections of the past are questionable, and Lewis' grandmother, who is losing her memory. In addition, the play is narrated by the adult Lewis.

In a foreword to the published play, the author writes:

"This play is a black hole of fiction, surrounded by a halo of truth. It has many autographical elements and although there are many factual and chronological discrepancies, I have tried to keep true to the emotional chronology of my youth... memory is remembered emotion, not facts."

== Significance of the title ==
The protagonist is hooked on sci-fi and enjoys fantasising that aliens have taken over the world by stealth. Initially, Lewis and his best friend, Dulcie, play games of make-believe involving scenarios of alien-invasion.

But as the people in Lewis' life change, he copes with his confusion by pretending aliens have invaded their bodies. The play follows Lewis' journey as he comes to grips with human nature – in all its forms – and its capacity for cruelty and prejudice, resilience and joy, and most of all, love.

References throughout the play to the Cold War and anxieties of the time about territorial invasion serve as a fitting historical backdrop.

== Premiere ==
The opening performance was on 12 March 1992 and was produced by the Melbourne Theatre Company at the Russell Street Theatre. It was performed by a number of actors who have since established themselves as veterans of Australia's theatre and television industry including Tamblyn Lord who played Lewis, Geneviève Picot who played Norma and Vince Colosimo who played Brian. The first production was directed by Nadia Tass, perhaps best known for her 1986 cult classic, Malcolm.

Louis Nowra was the narrator of the premiere production of Summer of the Aliens.

== Publication ==
The play was first published by Currency Press Pty Ltd in 1992, and reprinted in 1994, 1996, 1998 and 2000. The published play contains a five-page foreword by the author titled "I was a Teenage Alien" which provides some background about how the work came to be written.

== Sequels ==
That same year, Nowra wrote a sequel to Summer of the Aliens entitled Così. Set some time after the events of Summer of the Aliens, a much older Lewis agrees to direct a production of Mozart's opera Così fan tutte, featuring a cast of patients from a Melbourne mental institution. Così is considered to be Nowra's most popular play. It premiered in Sydney, featuring members of Company B in the main roles.

In 2017, Nowra returned to Lewis, with the play This Much Is True, which premiered at the Old Fitz Theatre from July 12 till August 12.
