= Kerri Sackville =

Australian author

Kerri Sackville is an Australian Jewish author and columnist. She writes columns for the Sydney Morning Herald and its related publications, and has published five non-fiction books mainly focused on lifestyle and advice.

== Early life and education ==
Sackville is a third-generation Australian of Russian and Polish Jewish descent, and attended a Jewish school as a child. In her childhood in the 1980s and into her youth, Sackville was an actor. After the birth of her first child she returned to education and completed a BA in English and linguistics.

== Writing career ==
After gaining her degree and the birth of her second child, Sackville began to have articles accepted in newspapers and parenting magazines. Soon was writing regularly for multiple publications, including a regular column in the Australian Jewish News for 12 years.

Her writing career took off while she still had young children, but faced an 18-month hiatus due to a loss in the family in 2007. She got back to writing by using Twitter and eventually started her blog Life & Other Crises in 2009, which she ran until 2016.

A major theme of her work is embracing imperfection, both in domestic life and the personal realm. Sackville has published five books, and contributed to other published works.

=== Books ===
- Sackville, Kerri (2011). When my husband does the dishes : a memoir of marriage and motherhood (1st ed.). Sydney: Random House Australia. ISBN 978-1-4596-1979-1. OCLC 880562586.
- Sackville, Kerri (2012). The little book of anxiety : confessions from a worried life (1st ed.). Sydney: Random House Australia. ISBN 978-1-4596-3964-5. OCLC 876313470.
- Sackville, Kerri (2018). Out there: A Survival Guide for Dating in Midlife. Richmond, Victoria: Echo. ISBN 978-1-76068-186-9. OCLC 1019677039.
- Sackville, Kerri (2022). The Life-changing magic of a little bit of mess. Sydney, NSW: HarperCollins Australia. ISBN 978-1-4607-6091-8. OCLC 1292634490.
- Sackville, Kerri (2023). The Secret Life of You: How a bit of alone time can change your life, relationships, and maybe the world. Pantera Press. ISBN 9780645412932. OCLC 1371754246.

== Personal life ==
Sackville has three children and lives in Sydney.
