= Patrick White : A Life =

1991 biography by Australian author David Marr

- Author: David Marr
- Language: English
- Genre: Biography
- Publisher: Jonathan Cape
- Publication date: 1991
- Publication place: UK
- Media type: Print
- Pages: 727 pp.
- Awards: 1991 The Age Book of the Year Awards — Book of the Year, winner; 1992 New South Wales Premier's Literary Awards — Douglas Stewart Prize for Non-Fiction, winner; 1992 Victorian Premier's Literary Awards — Award for Non-Fiction, winner
- ISBN: 0224025813

Patrick White : A Life is a 1991 biography of Australian Nobel Prize-winning author Patrick White, by Australian author David Marr.

It was the winner of numerous awards in Australia, including the 1991 The Age Book of the Year Awards — Book of the Year; the 1992 New South Wales Premier's Literary Awards — Douglas Stewart Prize for Non-Fiction; and the 1992 Victorian Premier's Literary Awards — Award for Non-Fiction.

== Critical reception ==
A. P. Riemer, reviewing the publication for The Sydney Morning Herald, called it an "ample, beautifully constructed and obviously deeply felt book." The review went on to say "This is a richly textured biography that will repay repeated readings. Its many strands are woven together smoothly, with great skill."

Reviewing the biography for Australian Book Review David Malouf noted "The tact with which Marr keeps White at a distance while entering fully into the spirit of the man, the skill with which he covers so much time and space to compose a narrative that is shapely, detailed, and has pace, drama, and real complexity, is something of a miracle. White’s was a great life and David Marr has made a great book of it."

== Awards ==
- 1991 The Age Book of the Year Awards — Book of the Year, winner
- 1991 The Age Book of the Year Awards — Non-Fiction Prize, winner
- 1992 Adelaide Festival Awards for Literature — Award for Non-Fiction, winner
- 1992 New South Wales Premier's Literary Awards — Douglas Stewart Prize for Non-Fiction, winner
- 1992 Victorian Premier's Literary Awards — Award for Non-Fiction, winner

== See also ==
- 1991 in Australian literature

== Notes ==
- The author was interviewed by Janet Hawley about the writing of the book for The Age newspaper, and by William Fraser for The Sydney Morning Herald.
- The original planned title of the book was The Stranger of All Time, a line taken from White's novel The Twyborn Affair.
- The Sydney Morning Herald newspaper published a series of extracts from the book on 6 July 1991, 8 July 1991, and 8 July 1991.

== Publication history ==
After the book's initial publication by Jonathan Cape in 1991 it was reprinted as follows:

- 1991 Random Century, Australia
- 1992 Vintage Australia, Australia
- 1992 Alfred A. Knopf, USA
- 2008 Vintage Australia, Australia
