= Sand Monkeys =

Book by Joanne Horniman

- First edition cover
- Author: Joanne Horniman
- Cover artist: Kerry Argent
- Language: English
- Genre: Young adult novel
- Publisher: Omnibus Books
- Publication date: 1992
- Publication place: Australia
- Media type: Print (Paperback)
- Pages: 120 pp (first edition, paperback)
- ISBN: 1-86291-164-9 (first edition, paperback)
- OCLC: 27615953

Sand Monkeys is a young adult novel by the Australian writer Joanne Horniman, who is known for novels centering on realistic depictions of people in unusual relationships. It was published in 1992 by Omnibus Books. The author's work on the novel was assisted by a writer's grant from the Australia Council. It received a Notable Book designation by the Children's Book Council of Australia.

Sand Monkeys follows a period in the life a sixteen-year-old boy named Max, upon moving into a new household in Petersham, an inner suburb of Sydney Australia. The narrative is framed by a series of letters which Max writes to his friend Socrates, in which Max describes his feelings about the events in the story.

== Background ==
Like Joanne Horniman's other works, The Serpentine Belt (1994) and Loving Athena (1997), Sand Monkeys features the theme of the search for a lost parent, as well as the forging of strong bonds between characters who are not related by blood.

In common with Joanne Horniman's other books, Sand Monkeys concerns people's interaction with the natural world - in this case, with the trees that Max raises and plants. She writes that this is "…not in the usual adventurous sense but in a more spiritual way. We are all connected with forces that we are only aware of some of the time…"

Author Joanne Horniman is involved with preserving the native Australian flora of her region in New South Wales, collecting and planting native plant seeds. In the novel, the main character Max reflects this concern in his project of raising native plants from seed, and planting them around his neighbourhood.

== Explanation of the novel's title ==
The title of the book comes from a notation on the back of Emma's photo, which shows Max and Emma as small children playing in a sand pit. In the notation, Max's mother refers to Max and Emma as "...our two little sand monkeys"

== Plot summary ==
Sixteen year old Max arrives in a new household inhabited by several families and individuals. Among them there are a six-year-old boy named Mango; and a fifteen-year-old girl, Emma. Emma and her father Ted — an old friend of Max's parents — had arrived in the household some months earlier.

Max brings the tree seedlings which he has grown from seeds with him when he moves in. Whilst he develops friendships with the other children, Emma remains distant from him. She does not appear to like Max; struggling to find her place in the household. For all of Emma's life, she and Ted had constantly been moving from city to city. Since arriving in Sydney, Emma had secretly located and found her mother, whom she had never previously met.

Max's classmate Olivia finds a photograph of Max at the age of four, building a sandcastle with another child. Olivia asks about this other child, and remarks that she looks like Emma. Max feels sure it couldn't be Emma, whom he has only recently met.

Max and Emma begin planting Max's tree seedlings at railway stations and in public parks. Max begins to have a strange feeling that he has known Emma for a long time. Meanwhile, a friendship develops between Olivia and Emma. It is through this friendship that Emma starts to find a real sense of belonging in the household.

The children offer the remaining trees to local residents, offering to plant them in their gardens. Mango asks what the trees will say to each other when they grow up and see each other over the roofs of the houses. Emma replies, "They’ll say, I’ve been waiting for ages to grow up and meet you. Where have you been all my life?”, this comment making Max sense a spiritual connection between themselves and the trees.

Max looks through his photos again, and realises that the other child in the photo is in fact Emma, as one photo also shows Ted. Max's mother explains that Emma had lived with their family for some time when she was young.

Eventually, Ted and Emma leave the household to move to Brisbane. Emma leaves something for Max in her room: an old photo of the two of them playing in the sand. It is identical to Max's.

== Awards and nominations ==
- Children's Book Council of Australia (CBCA) Notable Book designation
