= Robert Harris (poet) =

Australian poet

Robert Harris (1951 – 24 March 1993) was an Australian poet, who also wrote as Orson Rattray Der.

== Life ==
Robert Harris was born in Melbourne. He was educated in Doveton High School. He enlisted in the Australian Navy in 1968 during the Vietnam War. During the 1970s he spent time in a commune. He was married but separated from his wife in the 1980s with no children. He lived in Sydney in the later part of his life.

Harris died in Summer Hill, New South Wales on 24 March 1993 of a heart attack. His obituary in The Sydney Morning Herald stated that "he followed his own poetic path with little regard for the niceties of a literary career." A friend wrote "Robert Harris had only known two things in his short life: poverty and poetry. He knew poetry would get him, and it did."

Harris was involved in literary magazines as an author and as an editor. He worked as an editor for New Poetry magazine and for Overland magazine. Five books of his poetry were published.

His manuscript papers are held at the National Library of Australia.

== Themes and subject matter ==
David Malouf wrote that Harris understands that "poetry is one of the last remaining activities in which reverence is paid, in which the holiness of things is recognised in a way that may be essential to the fullest expression of what we are." Through his friendship with Sydney poet and singer Michael Driscoll, Harris became converted to charismatic Christianity, which informed the poems in A Cloud Passes Over, and later became a confirmed Anglican, which informed the poems in Jane, Interlinear.

The device of material presented as a kind of translation bookmarked his efforts with Translations from the Albatross and Jane, Interlinear. It provided a mechanism for expanding the vocabulary and musicality of the pieces. Poems such as Do I think we could have won, Signs & Wonders and O'Hara show a longing for softness and a relief from despair in himself and others, an eye for the underdog. Events and localities often frame or stimulated his poetry, for example New York, Sydney and country New South Wales. Isaiah by Kerosene Lantern Light from The Cloud Passes Over has many of Harris' themes: the memory of a friend, the locality (a tent), the contrast of the mild and the nasty (heresy hunter), the book as a thing that demands response.

In around 1990, he traveled to England to study Lady Jane Grey and visit the original locations.

He became progressively more interested in using poetry cycles, seeing a tendency in Australian contemporary poetry towards safety or lack of ambition. He responded to criticism that he was over-ambitious with the acerbic poem High & Low from The Cloud Passes Over which begins with a reference from a New Testament verse Ephesians 1.3 "Do I reach to high,/ will the judgment which I come under/ be therefore greater?" but he is revealed to be reaching for an empty glass in a pub as a menial glass-collector. Cycles also gave Harris an opportunity to deal with less autobiographical material and less parochial or obscure subjects than in his vignette-like shorter poems as found in The cloud passes over.

In his final book, these cycles were:

- Seven Songs for Sydney (10 poems), concerning the Royal Australian Navy cruiser HMAS Sydney and its sinking in World War II. Harris had served, possibly in the troopship of the same name during the Vietnam War, and felt a strong sympathetic connection to the sailors. It has the dedication "This poem is dedicated to those who perished in Sydney, their families and shipmates." It was performed at a poetry reading performance in 1987 at La Mama Theatre, produced by Barry Dickins. It was performed by Dickins in August 2008 for the ABC Radio Poetica program when the wreck of the cruiser was discovered.
- Jane, Interlinear (30 poems), concerning Lady Jane Grey. Harris was attracted to her for her youth, innocence, religious convictions, and persecution. The Interlinear refers to a form of synchronized text layout used in some biblical publications, from which the layout form of many of the poems is taken in a way that emphasizes phrases, as well as the more obvious meaning.
- After the Process (24 mostly unconnected poems), including
  - Notations of N.Y.C. (5 poems)
- Silver Buckle (12 poems) about sex and impending middle age.
- Recorder Music (4 poems) is material from the Jane cycle which did not fit, or which came as a response.

== Appreciation ==
In the article on Australia in The Oxford Guide to Contemporary World Literature Peter Craven says of Harris that he:

wrote distinguished work and, at the end of his life, a masterpiece Jane, Interlinear and Other Poems.

Poet Jill Jones wrote concerning neglected masterpieces:

And poetry? Well, I don’t think you can go past Robert Harris’s Jane, Interlinear and Other Poems. So much guff gets talked about this 'n that these days. Harris’s book is the real deal.

Writer David Malouf is quoted in Harris' obituary:

One of the most talented poets of his generation.

He is the subject of a poem by Tim Thorne, The Living Are Left with Imagined Lives, and also Et in Arcadia Ego. He is a subject of a poem in Weeping for Lost Babylon by Eric Beach. He is a subject in a poem The Ghost of John Forbes by Dorothy Hewett. Noting a poem by Robert Adamson (Cornflowers - in memorium Robert Harris), a critic wrote in 1994 "Can the anthology of elegies for Robert Harris be far off?"

His poems have been included in the New Oxford Book of Australian Verse (The Enthusiast, Riding over Belmore Park, Tambaroora Remembers), the Oxford Book of Australian Religious Verse (The Eagle), and Chapters into verse : poetry in English inspired by the Bible (Isaiah by Kerosene Lantern Light).

His essay The Carriers Off of the Dead has been included in the Oxford Book of Australian Essays.

Robert Adamson used to judge the Robert Harris Ulitarra Poetry Prize.

== Prizes ==
- Harri Jones Memorial Prize for Poetry (1975)
- C.J. Dennis Prize for Poetry (Victorian Premier's Literary Award for Poetry) (1992) for Jane, Interlinear. Posthumous
- Shortlisted for the Kenneth Slessor NSW Premier's Prize for Poetry 1992

Harris received four literary grants in the 1970s.

== Bibliography ==
- Localities (1973) Seahorse Publications ISBN 0909401004
- Translations from the Albatross (1976) Outback Press ISBN 086888037X
- The Abandoned (1979) Senor Press ISBN 0908515006
- The Cloud Passes Over (1986) Angus & Robertson ISBN 0207152861
- Jane, Interlinear and Other Poems (1992) Paper Bark Press ISBN 0958780161
- The Gang of One : Selected Poems (2019) Grand Parade Poets ISBN 9780994600226
