= Elizabeth Riddell =

Australian poet and journalist (1910–1998)

- Born: 21 March 1910; Napier, New Zealand
- Died: 3 July 1998 (aged 88); Sydney, New South Wales
- Occupations: medical practitioner and poet
- Writing career
- Language: English
- Years active: 1928-1998
- Notable awards: Walkley Award, Patrick White Award

Elizabeth Riddell (21 March 1910 – 3 July 1998) was a New Zealand-born Australian poet and journalist.

== Life ==
Born in Napier, New Zealand, Elizabeth Richmond Riddell came to Australia in 1928 where she worked at Smith's Weekly and won a Walkley Award.

She married Edward Neville 'Blue' Greatorex (1901–1964) in Sydney in 1935. The couple did not have children. In 1935 she moved to England and during World War II worked for Ezra Norton at The Daily Mirror, chiefly in New York City. Her first short book of poems, The Untrammelled, was published in 1940. After the war she returned to Australia to continue working as a journalist, and in the 1960s became art critic and feature writer for The Australian. She was the first Walkley Award winner for The Australian, winning in 1968 and 1969 for 'Best Newspaper Feature Story'. In 1986 she was awarded Critic of the Year by the Australian Book Review. Riddell's poetry won the Kenneth Slessor Prize for Poetry in 1992 and the Patrick White Award in 1995.

Widowed in 1964, Riddell died in 1998.

== Bibliography ==
- The Untrammelled, Viking, 1940
- Poems, Ure Smith, 1948
- Song for a Crowning, W. H. Paling, 1953. Songs with music by G. S. English
- Forbears, Angus & Robertson, 1961
- Country Tune, J. Albert, 1973. Songs with music by G. S. English
- Occasions of Birds and Other Poems, Brindabella Press , 1987
- From the Midnight Courtyard, Angus & Robertson, 1989
- Selected Poems, Angus & Robertson, 1992
- The Difficult Island, Molonglo, 1994

=== Selected list of poems ===
Title	Year	First published	Reprinted/collected in
"Lifesaver"	1931	The Bulletin, 4 March 1931	Poems by Elizabeth Riddell
"The Children March"	1944	Australian Poetry 1943 edited by H. M. Green	Forbears, Angus and Robertson, 1961, p. 27
