= Così =

Play written by Louis Nowra

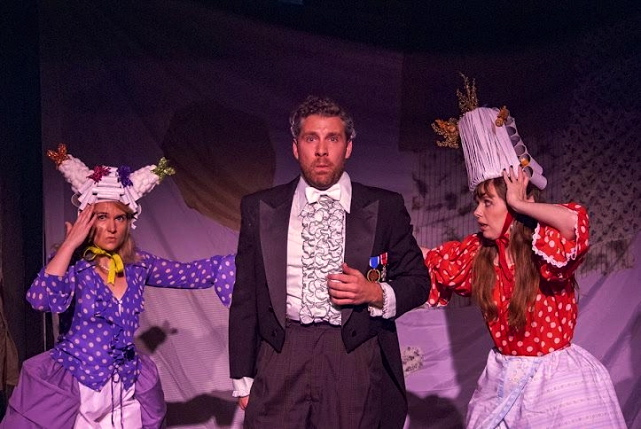
- Così at Urban Stages in New York City, 2012
- Original language: English
- Written by: Louis Nowra
- Genre: Drama
- Setting: Mental institution in Melbourne, 1971

Premiere
- Date: 1992
- Place: Belvoir St Theatre, Sydney, Australia

Così is a play by Australian playwright Louis Nowra which was first performed in 1992 at the Belvoir St Theatre in Sydney, Australia. Set in a Melbourne mental hospital in 1971, Così is semi-autobiographical, and is the sequel to his previous semi-autobiographical play, Summer of the Aliens.

The play was adapted into the 1996 film Cosi.

== Plot summary ==
Set several years after the events of Summer of the Aliens, Lewis is now in a strained relationship with a bossy woman named Lucy, and in a friendship with political extremist, Nick. Lewis is always desperate for work as he states "I need the money". The venue is a theatre that smells of "burnt wood and mould", the cast are patients with very diverse needs, and the play is Mozart's Così fan tutte. Through working with the patients, Lewis eventually discovers a new side of himself which allows him to become emotionally involved and to value love, while anti-Vietnam war protests erupt in the streets outside.

== Characters ==
- Lewis: The director of the production and main character. He is Lucy's boyfriend but later has an affair with Julie, one of the mental patients.
- Roy: A manic-depressive with a passion for theatre, especially the play Cosi. He is often annoyed with Lewis' directing as he finds it lacklustre.
- Cherry: A large woman with a food obsession and is a Lewis-addicted romantic.
- Ruth: A woman suffering from obsessive–compulsive disorder (OCD) and is shown as obsessed with counting and distinguishing between illusions and reality
- Doug: A pyromaniac, who often makes innuendo. He was admitted into the psych hospital after setting his mother's cats one fire, which later burned down her house.
- Julie: A drug addict who has a dependency on junk. She kisses Lewis, making his fidelity come into question.
- Henry: An older, silent man who was previously a lawyer. His despises communists as his dad was a soldier in the Korean War.
- Zac: A drugged-up pianist who despises Mozart and favours Wagner.
- Lucy: Lewis' girlfriend who has an affair with Nick.
- Nick: Lewis' best friend and a political left-wing extremist.
- Justin: A social worker at the mental institution.

== Productions ==
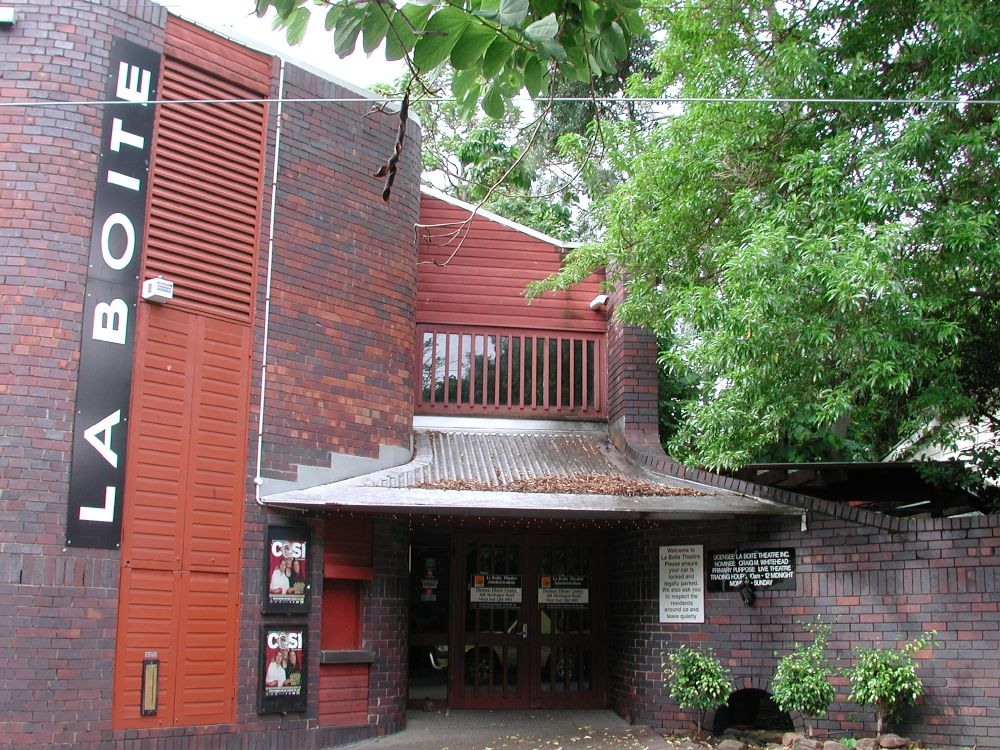
La Boite Theatre with Così posters, 2003

Così was performed at La Boite Theatre in February, 2003. The play debuted in Asia in 2009, performed in The Hong Kong Fringe Club and directed by Wendy Herbert. It received its UK premiere in 1999 at the New End Theatre in London, starring Isla Fisher in her only stage appearance to date. It was performed at the White Bear Theatre in Kennington, London, starring Australian actor Mark Little as the manic-depressive Roy and Matthew Burton as the young theatre director, Lewis; it was directed by Adam Spreadbury-Maher for a 4-week season in August 2008. In 2011, the play was performed at the King's Head Theatre in Islington, London, directed by Adam Spreadbury-Maher. In 2012, the play was performed at Urban Stages in New York City, directed by Jesse Michael Mothershed and produced by Australian Made Entertainment. In February 2014, the play was given a major Australian revival by La Boite Theatre Company directed by longtime Louis Nowra collaborator David Berthold. Melbourne based theatre company MTC revived it again in a production directed by Sarah Goodes in May 2019.
