= Brian Caswell =

Australian author of young adult fiction

- Born: 13 January 1954 (age 72); Gwernaffield, Flintshire, Wales
- Occupations: Novelist, Dean of Research and Program Development with MindChamps Singapore
- Writing career
- Period: 1989–present
- Genres: Science fiction, Young adult fiction

Brian Caswell (born 13 January 1954) is an Australian author of young adult fiction.

== Biography ==
Brian Caswell was born in a village called Gwernaffield in Wales, on 13 January 1954. His family moved to England, when he was 5 years old. When he was 12, in 1966, Caswell's family moved to Australia. He received a Bachelor of Arts and a Diploma of Education, and graduated from the University of NSW. In the 1970s, Caswell took up singing and songwriting, and was successful for some years, one of his songs making the top 40 music charts and another winning a 'Golden Guitar' for song of the year. He became a school teacher in 1976, giving up performing, but continued writing songs.

Caswell taught at several high schools, mainly in the areas of history, English and creative writing. For 15 years he worked as a teacher and basketball coach. He began writing for the students he was teaching, publishing his first book, Merryll of the Stones, in 1989. He gave up teaching after his success of his first two books, and began to write full-time. He won the 1995 Children's Peace Literature Award for his book, Deucalion.

In 1998, he began working with friend and co-author David Chiem, to develop MindChamps – a company established to research the neuroscience and psychology of education and to develop engaging learning strategies in tune with the demands of the 21st century. Since 2007, he has written five books for parents and teachers on different aspects of education and the development of the learning mind.

Caswell lives in Fountaindale, New South Wales, with his wife, Marlene.

=== MindChamps ===
With 45 years of experience as a teacher, author, lecturer and creativity coach, Brian is the Dean of Research and Programme Development at MindChamps. Since MindChamps was founded in Sydney, Australia in 1998, David Chiem and Brian have worked with thousands of young people around the world, and advised and trained thousands more parents, trainers, teachers and education advisors to help them make a difference in the lives of the children under their care.

== Bibliography ==
Fiction

- Merryll of the Stones (1989)
- A Dream of Stars (1991)
- A Cage of Butterflies (1992)
- Mike (1993)
- Lisdalia (1994)
- Dreamslip (1994)
- Darryl (1995)
- Deucalion (1995)
- Maddie (1995)
- Sweet Revenge (1995)
- Asturias (1996)
- Relax Max! (1997)
- Only the Heart (1997), co-authored with David Phu An Chiem.
- Gargantua (1998)
- Gladiators in the Holo-Colosseum (1998)
- Messengers of the Great Orff (1998)
- TeeDee and the Collectors, or How It All Began (1998)
- The View from Ararat (1998)
- The Full Story (2002), co-authored with David Phu An Chiem.
- Double Exposure (2005)
- Loop (2006)
- Cruisin' (2008)
- The Dreams of the Chosen (2013)

Education and Learning

- Deeper than the Ocean (2007), co-authored with David Phu An Chiem.
- The Art of Communicating with Your Child (2009), co-authored with David Phu An Chiem.
- The 3-Mind Revolution (2009), co-authored with David Phu An Chiem (Revised 2nd Edition 2016).
- Talking with the Sky (2010), co-authored with David Phu An Chiem and Kylie Bell.
- Magic Moments: Small Beginnings (2013), co-authored with Carmee Lim.
