= Louis Nowra =

Australian writer (born 1950)

- Born: Mark Doyle; 12 December 1950 (age 75); Melbourne, Victoria, Australia
- Occupations: Playwright, screenwriter, librettist, author
- Writing career
- Genres: Theatre, screenwriting

Mark Doyle, better known by his stage name Louis Nowra, (born 12 December 1950) is an Australian writer, playwright, screenwriter and librettist.

He is best known as one of Australia's leading playwrights. His works have been performed by all of Australia's major theatre companies, including Sydney Theatre Company, Melbourne Theatre Company, Queensland Theatre Company, State Theatre Company of South Australia, Belvoir, and many others, and have also had many international productions. His most significant plays are Così, Radiance (both of which he turned into films), Byzantine Flowers, Summer of the Aliens and The Golden Age. In 2006 he completed The Boyce Trilogy for Griffin Theatre Company, consisting of The Woman with Dog's Eyes, The Marvellous Boy and The Emperor of Sydney, all directed by David Berthold.

His 2009 novel Ice was shortlisted for the Miles Franklin Award. His script for 1996 movie Cosi, which revolves around a group of mentally ill patients who put on a play, won the Australian Film Institute Award that year for Best Adapted Screenplay. Nowra's work as a scriptwriter also includes a credit on the comedy The Matchmaker and the Vincent Ward romance Map of the Human Heart, which was invited to the Cannes Film Festival.

His radio plays include Albert Names Edward, The Song Room, The Widows and the five part The Divine Hammer, which aired on the ABC in 2003.

He has written two memoirs, The Twelfth of Never (1999) and Shooting the Moon (2004). In March 2007, Nowra published a controversial book on violence in Aboriginal communities, Bad Dreaming. He was also one of the principal writers for the multi award-winning 2008 SBS TV series, First Australians.

Nowra is also a cultural commentator, with essays and commentary appearing regularly in The Monthly and the Australian Literary Review as well as major newspapers. He has been married three times, and is bisexual, having had relationships with men as well.

== Biography ==
Nowra was born Mark Doyle in Melbourne, to the second of his mother's three husbands. His mother told him as a boy that he would hear stories about her having killed a man, but he was not to believe any version but her own, which she would not reveal until his 21st birthday. His sister later told him that their mother had killed her own father, their grandfather. On his 21st birthday, 12 December 1971, his mother confirmed this, and said that it had occurred on 12 December 1945, exactly five years before he was born. His mother was charged with murder but acquitted on the ground of extreme provocation after years of alcohol-fuelled violence. His father was also abusive when he was around, but he was an interstate truck driver who was not often home. His mother has not seen, heard or read any of his work, and he has had almost no contact with her since he left Melbourne. He has had no contact with his father at all. He developed an early love of theatre through his uncle Bob Herbert, a stage manager for J. C. Williamson's productions.

In the early 1970s he walked out of his Australian literature studies at Melbourne's La Trobe University. The subject of a tutorial was Patrick White's novel The Tree of Man. Nowra stood up, said he thought it was dreadful, walked out and never returned to finish his degree.

He later had a difficult personal relationship with Patrick White. White championed Nowra's early work (Visions, Inside the Island), even taking out a paid advertisement in The Sydney Morning Herald when they refused to publish his letter admonishing the theatre critic H. G. Kippax, who had been negative about the plays. But Nowra never liked White's work. White could also be very negative about Nowra. He attended the premiere of Nowra's translation of Rostand's Cyrano de Bergerac, but left the auditorium before the start because he thought, sight unseen, it would be uninteresting. His partner Manoly Lascaris refused to leave, so White sat out the performance in the foyer.

Nowra had a similarly challenging relationship with the actress Judy Davis, who appeared in some of his plays. Nowra considered both White and Davis had personalities that combined self-loathing, narcissism, ruthlessness and haughty egos.

His first plays were written at La Mama Theatre in Melbourne in 1973. Soon after abandoning his university degree, he got into his car one day and decided to drive north, as far away from his parents as possible, but without any clear destination. He reached the NSW coastal town of Nowra, when his car broke down. He had already decided to abandon his birth name, and chose Nowra because of this enforced stop. He worked in several jobs and lived an itinerant lifestyle until the mid-1970s, when his plays began to attract attention. Since this time he has lived in Sydney, mainly in Kings Cross.

In late 1974 he married the composer Sarah de Jong; they co-wrote some of the music for his stage works. In 1976 they lived in Munich, Germany for six months. They divorced ten years later, after he had an affair with her best female friend. During his marriage to de Jong, he was resident playwright of the Sydney Theatre Company in 1979–1980, and Associate Director at Adelaide's Lighthouse Theatre in 1982–1983.

He also appeared in the 1988 Australian film The Everlasting Secret Family as a shop assistant, his only film acting role.

He engaged in a number of gay relationships for some time, before marrying his second wife, television presenter Gerri Williams, at the Soho Bar in Kings Cross, in early 1997. It was attended by the Sisters of Perpetual Indulgence. He married his third and current wife, the author Mandy Sayer, in 2003. They had worked together when they co-edited the anthology In the Gutter ... Looking at the Stars in 2000. They have separate homes not far from each other, in which their daytime writing activities are conducted, and they come together in the evening. In February 2014 they were named joint holders of the 2014 Copyright Agency Non-Fiction Writer-in-Residence at the University of Technology, Sydney.

Nowra's plays are studied in Veronica Kelly's work The Theatre of Louis Nowra.

== Awards ==
- 1990 – Prix Italia award, for the radio play Summer of the Aliens
- 1992 – Winner of the NSW Premier's Literary Prize for the play Cosi
- 1994 – Winner of Victoria Premier's, Louis Esson Prize for Drama for The Temple
- 1994 – Australian Literary Society Gold Medal for Radiance and The Temple
- 1994 – The Australia/Canada Award
- 1995 – Green Room Award for Best New Play
- 1996 – Honorary Doctorate – Griffith University, 1996
- 1996 – Australian Film Institute Award – Best Adapted Screenplay for Cosi
- 1999 – Nominated for Green Room Award Best New Australian Play for Language of the Gods
- 2000 – Nominated for New South Wales Premier's Literary Awards for The Twelfth of Never
- 2000 – Courier-Mail Book of The Year for The Twelfth of Never
- 2009 – Shortlisted for the Miles Franklin Award for Ice
- 2009 – First Australians: Logie Award: Outstanding Documentary or Documentary Series
- 2009 – First Australians: New South Wales Premier's Literary Awards Script Writing Award for Louis Nowra, Rachel Perkins and Beck Cole
- 2009 – First Australians: Australian Writers' Guild Award: Outstanding Writing in a Documentary (Episode 1) for Louis Nowra and Rachel Perkins
- 2013 – Patrick White Literary Award

== Works ==
=== Plays ===
- Kiss The One-Eyed Priest (1973)
- Death of Joe Orton (1974)
- Inner Voices (Currency Press, 1977)
- The Lady of the Camellias (1979)
- Visions (Currency Press, 1979)
- Beauty and the Beast (1980)
- Cyrano De Bergerac (1980; translation of Edmond Rostand's French play)
- Inside The Island (Currency Press, 1981)
- The Precious Woman (Currency Press, 1981)
- Lulu (1981; adapted from Frank Wedekind's Earth Spirit and Pandora's Box)
- The Prince of Homburg (1982)
- Royal Show (1982)
- Spellbound (1982)
- Sunrise (Currency Press, 1983)
- Albert Names Edward (Currency Press, 1983)
- The Golden Age (Currency Press, 1985)
- The Song Room (Editions Rodopi, 1987)
- Capricornia (Currency Press, 1988; adapted from Xavier Herbert's novel)
- Byzantine Flowers (1989)
- Watchtower (1990)
- The Lewis Trilogy:
  - Summer of the Aliens (Currency Press, 1992)
  - Così (Currency Press, 1992)
  - This Much Is True (Currency Press, 2017)
- Radiance (1993)
- The Temple (1993)
- Crow (1994)
- Incorruptible (Currency Press, 1995)
- Jungle (1995)
- Miss Bosnia (1995)
- Language of the Gods (Currency Press, 1999)
- Beatrice (2003)
- Devil Is A Woman (2004)
- The Boyce Trilogy:
  - The Woman with Dog's Eyes (2004)
  - The Marvellous Boy (2005)
  - The Emperor of Sydney (2006)
- Page 8 (2006)

=== Non-fiction writing ===
- The Cheated (Angus & Robertson, Australia, 1979)
- Warne's World (Duffy & Snellgrove, Australia, 2002)
- Chihuahuas, Women and Me (Giramondo, Australia, 2005)
- Bad Dreaming (Pluto Press, Australia, 2007)
- Kings Cross: A Biography (NewSouth Publishing, Australia, 2013)
- Woolloomooloo: A Biography (NewSouth Publishing, Australia, 2017)
- Sydney: A Biography (NewSouth Publishing, Australia, 2020)

=== Novels ===
- The Misery of Beauty (Angus & Robertson, Australia, 1976)
- Palu (Picador, Australia, 1987)
- Red Nights (Picador, Australia, 1997)
- Abaza (Picador, Australia, 2001)
- Ice (Allen & Unwin, 2008)
- Into That Forest (Allen & Unwin, 2012)

=== Memoirs ===
- The Twelfth of Never (Picador, Australia, 1999) ISBN 978-0-330-36187-3
- Shooting the Moon (Picador, Australia, 2004) ISBN 978-0-330-36490-4

=== Screenwriting ===
- Displaced Persons (1985) (TV film)
- Hunger (1986)
- The Lizard King (1986)
- The Last Resort (TV series, 1988)
- Map of the Human Heart (1992)
- Heaven's Burning (1997)
- Radiance (associate producer/writer, 1998)
- Twisted Tales Directly From My Heart to You (1996)
- The Matchmaker (screenplay, 1997)
- Così (screenplay, 1997)
- K-19: The Widowmaker (2002)
- Black and White (2002)
- Rain of the Children (additional dialogue, 2008)

=== Libretti ===
- Inner Voices Victorian State Opera, 1978
- Whitsunday Opera Australia, 1988
- Love Burns Seymour Group, 1992 Adelaide Festival of Arts
- On the Beach Victorian Arts Centre Rio Tinto Grant 2000
- Midnight Son, Victorian Opera 2012

=== Anthologies ===
- In the Gutter ... Looking at the Stars: A Literary Adventure Through Kings Cross (2000; ed. Louis Nowra, Mandy Sayer)

=== Essays ===
Nowra has also published a number of essays:

- "Nowhere Near Hollywood: Australian Film"., The Monthly, December 2009 – January 2010, pp. 44–52.
- "The Whirling Dervish: Tony Abbott". 28 January 2010.,The Monthly, February 2010, pp. 22–29
- "The Better Self?: Germaine Greer and the Female Eunuch"., The Monthly, March 2010, pp. 40–46.
