= Deucalion (novel) =

1995 novel by Brian Caswell

- First edition
- Author: Brian Caswell
- Cover artist: Hans De Haas
- Language: English
- Genre: Young adult, science fiction
- Publisher: UQP
- Publication date: 1 September 1995
- Publication place: Australia
- Media type: Print (Paperback)
- Pages: 216 (first edition)
- ISBN: 0-7022-2865-6
- Followed by: The View from Ararat

Deucalion is a 1995 young adult science fiction novel by Brian Caswell. It follows the story of many settlers who have travelled across space to build a new future on the planet Deucalion. However the future is uncertain for the Elokoi or Icarus people who were settled on the planet first.

== Background ==
Deucalion was first published in Australia on 1 September 1995 by the University of Queensland Press in trade paperback format. In 1996 it was published as an audiobook by Louis Braille Books and in 2002 it was released in the United Kingdom by Flyways. It has also been distributed to North America by International Specialized Book Services. Deucalion joint won along with Garth Nix's Sabriel the 1995 Aurealis Award for best young-adult novel and was a short-list nominee for the 1996 Children's Book Council of Australia: Book of the Year, Older Readers award.

== Setting ==
The novel opens in the late 23rd century AD, by which time, humanity has explored light years out into space. However, only one habitable planet has been discovered, named Deucalion. Deucalion is 34 light-years away from Earth, with one large continent and an inland sea. Deucalion has a native sentient population, named the Elokoi, similar to H.G Wells' Eloi from The Time Machine. The Elokoi are at a level of civilisation similar to the Stone Age. Both Human and Elokoi settlements are only on the east coast of the continent, however, human settlers have forced the Elokoi to live on reservations. The human capital is called New Geneva.

Though having developed interstellar travel, spaceships can still only travel at the speed of light, and no faster, so it takes thirty-four years for even the fastest of ships to reach Deucalion. Passengers on board ships have to be cryogenically preserved.
