= A Cage of Butterflies =

1992 novel by Brian Caswell

- Author: Brian Caswell
- Cover artist: Gregory Rogers
- Language: English
- Publisher: University of Queensland Press
- Publication date: 1992
- Publication place: Australia
- Media type: Print (Paperback & Audio)
- Pages: 164 pp
- ISBN: 0-7022-2416-2
- OCLC: 27531260
- LC Class: PZ7.C26876 Cag 1992

A Cage of Butterflies is a 1992 young adult novel by Australian author Brian Caswell.

== Plot summary ==
The story is set in a research facility (known as the "farm") involving two groups of people. The first group contains several teenagers with IQs above 150. These teenagers (Greg, Mikki, Lesley, Gordon, Gretel, Katie and Chris) call themselves the "Think Tank". However, this group is merely a smokescreen for the real subjects of the research - five seven-year-olds who are able to communicate telepathically, known as the "Babies". The Babies are called Pep, Ricardo, Ian, Rachael and Myriam. The Babies were all born around the same time in the same hospital.

When the members of the first group are "contacted" by the Babies, they learn of the researchers' exploitation, and, with the help of compassionate workers at the facility (Susan and Erik), investigate the reason for the Babies' condition. The Babies need help as the head researcher, Larsen, will stop at nothing to solve the mystery. The Think Tank, as well as researcher Susan and young orderly Erik, provide this help.

They trick the head researcher, John Larsen, so they can escape. The story ends with the Think Tank six years into the future. They turned the think tank into 'Think Tank Inc.', a company worth three million dollars. The Babies, Think Tank and newlyweds Erik and Susan all live together. Greg and Mikki are also married.

The title, "A Cage of Butterflies" refers to the fact that Larsen and the research staff keep both the Babies and the think tank under constant supervision and keep them "caged" or "prisoners" since they do not allow them to move around freely.

== Characters ==
=== Think Tank ===
- Greg
- Mikki
- Katie
- Lesley
- Gordon
- Gretel
- Chris

=== Researchers/scientists ===
- Larsen
- Susan
- Erik
- MacIntyre
- Richard (formerly)

=== The Babies ===
- Ian (twins with Rachael)
- Myriam
- Ricardo
- Rachael
- Pep

== Awards ==
- Shortlisted 3M Talking Book of the Year Award 1993
- Shortlisted CBCA Book of the Year Awards Older Readers 1993
