= Joanne Horniman =

Australian author (born 1951)

- Born: 1951 (age 74–75); Murwillumbah, New South Wales, Australia
- Education: University in Sydney
- Occupations: Author; Editor; Teacher
- Writing career
- Notable works: Loving Athena, Mahalia, Sand Monkeys
- Notable awards: Notable Book, Honour Book, Australian Children's Book Council Awards

Joanne Horniman (born 1951) is an Australian author who has won several awards for her books for children, teenagers and young adults. Her novels often set in country New South Wales, and often deal with such themes as the search for identity, family relationships, growing up in rural communities, and teenage parenthood.

== Biography ==
Joanne Horniman grew up in Murwillumbah in country New South Wales, Australia. She started writing at the age of about six, and has written stories on a regular basis since then. Growing up, she had an avid interest in politics, regularly reading the works of Karl Marx. She studied at university in Sydney, and has worked as an editor, a colleges and university teacher, and as an author. She now lives in Lismore in northern New South Wales. Her novel Loving Athena (2001) won a Notable Book title in the Australian Children's Book Council Awards in 1998; and her novel Mahalia (2001) won an Honour Book title in the same awards in 2002. After writing a number of books for teenagers and young adults, she wrote her first book for adults, A Charm of Powerful Trouble in 2002.

== Novels ==
- Sand Monkeys, 1992
- The Serpentine Belt, 1994
- Loving Athena, 1997
- Mahalia, 2001
- A Charm of Powerful Trouble, 2002
- Secret Scribbled Notebooks, 2004
- Little Wing, 2006
- My Candlelight Novel, 2008
- About a Girl, 2010

== Novels for younger readers ==
- Jasmine, 1995
- Sunflower, 1999

== Picture books ==
- Billygoat Goes Wild, 1995
- Furry-Back and the Lizard-Thing, 1996
