= 1980 in Australian literature =

This article presents a list of the historical events and publications of Australian literature during 1980.

== Events ==
- The Australian/Vogel Literary Award: Inaugural award to Archie Weller, The Day Of The Dog; the award was initially given to Paul Radley, who, in 1996, admitted that his manuscript was actually written by his uncle.
- Jessica Anderson won the 1980 Miles Franklin Award for The Impersonators

== Major publications ==
=== Books ===
- Jessica Anderson — The Impersonators
- Murray Bail — Homesickness
- Jon Cleary — A Very Private War
- Shirley Hazzard — The Transit of Venus
- Elizabeth Jolley — Palomino
- Thomas Keneally — The Cut-Rate Kingdom
- Randolph Stow — The Girl Green as Elderflower

=== Short story collections ===
- Helen Garner – Honour & Other People's Children

=== Science fiction ===
- Damien Broderick — The Dreaming Dragons

=== Crime and mystery ===
- Peter Corris — The Dying Trade
- Gabrielle Lord — Fortress

=== Children's and Young Adult fiction ===
- Pamela Allen – The Archimedes' Bath
- Mavis Thorpe Clark – A Stranger Came to the Mine
- Robert Ingpen — The Voyage of the Poppykettle
- Ruth Park — Playing Beatie Bow
- Ruth Park and Deborah Niland – When the Wind Changed

=== Poetry ===
- Jenny Boult – The Hotel Anonymous
- Gwen Harwood – "Lamplight"
- Kate Llewellyn – "To a Married Man"
- Richard Lunn – Pompeii Deep Fry
- Les Murray — The Boys Who Stole the Funeral
- Judith Rodriguez — Mudcrab at Gambaro's
- Gig Ryan
  - The Division of Anger
  - "If I Had a Gun"
- Philip Salom — The Silent Piano
- Chris Wallace-Crabbe — The Golden Apples of the Sun : Twentieth Century Australian Poetry (anthology) editor

=== Non-fiction ===
- Robyn Davidson – Tracks
- Allan M. Grocott – Convicts, Clergymen and Churches
- Clive James – Unreliable Memoirs
- David Marr – Barwick

== Awards and honours ==
- Kylie Tennant – Officer of the Order of Australia (AO)
- Max Fatchen – Member of the Order of Australia (AM)
- Marjorie Barnard – Medal of the Order of Australia (OAM)
- Patsy Adam-Smith – Officer of the British Empire (OBE)

=== Lifetime achievement ===
Award	Author
Christopher Brennan Award	John Blight
Patrick White Award	Bruce Dawe

=== Literary ===
Award	Author	Title	Publisher
The Age Book of the Year Award	Murray Bail	Homesickness	Macmillan
The Age Book of the Year Award	David Ireland	A Woman of the Future	Penguin
ALS Gold Medal	No award		
Colin Roderick Award	Allan Grocott	Convicts, Clergymen and Churches	Sydney University Press

=== Fiction ===
Award	Author	Title	Publisher
The Age Book of the Year Award	Murray Bail	Homesickness	Macmillan
The Age Book of the Year Award	David Ireland	A Woman of the Future	Penguin
The Australian/Vogel Literary Award	Archie Weller	The Day of the Dog	Allen & Unwin
Miles Franklin Award	Jessica Anderson	The Impersonators	Macmillan
New South Wales Premier's Literary Awards	Peter Carey	War Crimes	University of Queensland Press

=== Children and Young Adult ===
Award	Category	Author	Title	Publisher
Children's Book of the Year Award	Older Readers	Lee Harding	Displaced Person	Hyland House
Children's Book of the Year Award	Picture Book	Peter Pavey	One Dragon's Dream	Nelson Australia
New South Wales Premier's Literary Awards	Children's Book Award	Pamela Allen	Mr Archimedes' Bath	William Collins
New South Wales Premier's Literary Awards	Special Children's Book Award	Catherine Berndt	Land of the Rainbow Snake	William Collins

=== Science fiction and fantasy ===
Award	Category	Author	Title	Publisher
Australian SF Achievement Award	Best Australian Science Fiction	Robert Ingpen	Australian Gnomes	Rigby

=== Poetry ===
Award	Author	Title	Publisher
Anne Elder Award	Richard Lunn	Pompeii Deep Fry	Randolph Press
Grace Leven Prize for Poetry	Les Murray	The Boys Who Stole the Funeral	Angus & Robertson
New South Wales Premier's Literary Awards	David Campbell	The Man in the Honeysuckle	Angus & Robertson

=== Non-fiction ===
Award	Author	Title	Publisher
The Age Book of the Year Award	Not awarded		
New South Wales Premier's Literary Awards	David Marr	Barwick	Allen & Unwin

== Births ==
A list, ordered by date of birth (and, if the date is either unspecified or repeated, ordered alphabetically by surname) of births in 1980 of Australian literary figures, authors of written works or literature-related individuals follows, including year of death.

- 7 July – Brooke Davis, novelist

Unknown date

- Elizabeth Campbell, poet
- Ceridwen Dovey, novelist

== Deaths ==
A list, ordered by date of death (and, if the date is either unspecified or repeated, ordered alphabetically by surname) of deaths in 1980 of Australian literary figures, authors of written works or literature-related individuals follows, including year of birth.

- 2 September – Frederick Macartney, poet and critic (born 1887)
- 3 February – Marnie Bassett, historian and biographer (born 1889)
- 18 October – Martin Haley, poet and translator (born 1905)

== See also ==
- 1980 in Australia
- 1980 in literature
- 1980 in poetry
- List of years in literature
- List of years in Australian literature
