= 1979 in Australian literature =

This article presents a list of the historical events and publications of Australian literature during 1979.

== Events ==
- David Ireland won the 1979 Miles Franklin Award for A Woman of the Future
- The New South Wales Premier's Literary Awards are presented for the first time

== Major publications ==
=== Books ===
- Gabrielle Carey and Kathy Lette – Puberty Blues
- David Ireland – A Woman of the Future
- Thomas Keneally
  - Confederates
  - Passenger
- Roger McDonald – 1915: A Novel of Gallipoli
- Randolph Stow – Visitants
- Morris West — Proteus
- Patrick White – The Twyborn Affair

=== Short stories ===
- Glenda Adams — "A Snake Down Under"
- Thea Astley — Hunting the Wild Pineapple
- Peter Carey — War Crimes
- Elizabeth Jolley – The Travelling Entertainer and Other Stories

=== Science Fiction and Fantasy ===
- A. Bertram Chandler – Matilda's Stepchildren
- Anne Spencer Parry – The Crown of Darkness

=== Children's and Young Adult fiction ===
- Catherine Berndt – Land of the Rainbow Snake
- Mavis Thorpe Clark – The Lilly-Pilly
- Lee Harding – Displaced Person
- Joan Phipson:
  - No Escape
  - Mr Pringle and the Prince

=== Poetry ===
- Robert Adamson – Where I Come From
- David Campbell – The Man in the Honeysuckle
- Rosemary Dobson and David Campbell – Seven Russian Poets
- Robert Gray – Grass Script
- Les Harrop – The Hum of the Old Suit: Poems
- Gwen Harwood – "A Simple Story"
- Dorothy Hewett – Greenhouse
- Jennifer Maiden – The Border Loss
- Les Murray – The Boys Who Stole the Funeral
- John Tranter
  - Dazed in the Ladies Lounge
  - Editor, The New Australian Poetry (anthology)
- Chris Wallace-Crabbe
  - The Emotions Are Not Skilled Workers
  - Toil and Spin: Two Directions in Modern Poetry

=== Drama ===
- Dorothy Hewett – The Man From Mukinupin
- Louis Nowra
  - The Lady of the Camellias
  - Visions

=== Non-fiction ===
- Manning Clark — A History of Australia Volume IV
- Terry Irving and Raewyn Connell — Class Structure in Australian History

== Awards and honours ==
=== Order of Australia ===
- John Jefferson Bray appointed Companion of the Order of Australia (AC)
- Nancy Keesing appointed Member of the Order of Australia (AM)
- Douglas Stewart appointed Officer of the Order of Australia (AO)
- Judah Waten appointed Member of the Order of Australia (AM)

=== Lifetime achievement ===
Award	Author
Christopher Brennan Award	Not awarded
Patrick White Award	Randolph Stow

=== Literary ===
Award	Author	Title	Publisher
The Age Book of the Year Award	Roger McDonald	1915: A Novel of Gallipoli	University of Queensland Press
ALS Gold Medal	Not awarded		
Colin Roderick Award	Thea Astley	Hunting the Wild Pineapple	Thomas Nelson

=== Fiction ===
Award	Author	Title	Publisher
The Age Book of the Year Award	Roger McDonald	1915: A Novel of Gallipoli	University of Queensland Press
Miles Franklin Award	David Ireland	A Woman of the Future	Penguin Books
New South Wales Premier's Literary Awards	David Malouf	An Imaginary Life	Chatto & Windus

=== Children and Young Adult ===
Award	Category	Author	Title	Publisher
Children's Book of the Year Award	Older Readers	Ruth Manley	The Plum-Rain Scroll	Hodder and Stoughton
Children's Book of the Year Award	Picture Book	No award		
New South Wales Premier's Literary Awards	Children's Book Award	Jenny Wagner, and Ron Brooks (illus)	John Brown, Rose and the Midnight Cat	Kestrel
New South Wales Premier's Literary Awards	Special Children's Book Award	Patricia Wrightson	The Dark Bright Water	Hutchinson

=== Science fiction and fantasy ===
Award	Category	Author	Title	Publisher
Australian SF Achievement Award	Best Australian Science Fiction	George Turner	Beloved Son	Faber

=== Poetry ===
Award	Author	Title	Publisher
Anne Elder Award	Les Harrop	The Hum of the Old Suit: Poems	Angus & Robertson
Grace Leven Prize for Poetry	David Campbell	The Man in the Honeysuckle	Angus & Robertson

=== Drama ===
Award	Author	Title
AWGIE Award for Stage	Ron Blair	Marx

=== Non-fiction ===
Award	Author	Title	Publisher
The Age Book of the Year Award	Not awarded		
New South Wales Premier's Literary Awards	A History of Australia Volume IV	Manning Clark	Melbourne University Press

== Births ==
A list, ordered by date of birth (and, if the date is either unspecified or repeated, ordered alphabetically by surname) of births in 1979 of Australian literary figures, authors of written works or literature-related individuals follows, including year of death.

- 21 May – James Clancy Phelan, writer of thrillers and young adult novels
- 6 June – Randa Abdel-Fattah, novelist

Unknown date

- Maxine Beneba Clarke, writer and slam poet
- Andrew Hutchinson, novelist

== Deaths ==
A list, ordered by date of death (and, if the date is either unspecified or repeated, ordered alphabetically by surname) of deaths in 1979 of Australian literary figures, authors of written works or literature-related individuals follows, including year of birth.

- 6 March – Helen Palmer, socialist publisher (born 1917)
- 6 June – Ion Idriess, writer (born 1889)
- 29 July – David Campbell, poet (born 1915)
- 13 August – F. J. Thwaites, novelist (born 1908)
- 21 November – Marie Byles, travel writer and non-fiction writer (born 1900)
- 24 November — Tom Quilty, pastoralist and bush poet (born 1887)
- 8 December – Jennifer Rankin, poet and playwright (born 1941)

== See also ==
- 1979 in Australia
- 1979 in literature
- 1979 in poetry
- List of years in literature
- List of years in Australian literature
