= Colin Roderick Award =

Australian literary award

The Margaret and Colin Roderick Literary Award is presented annually by the Foundation for Australian Literary Studies at Queensland's James Cook University for "the best book published in Australia which deals with any aspect of Australian life". It was first presented in 1967 and now has a prize of A$50,000. Starting in 1980, the H. T. Priestley Memorial Medal has also been bestowed upon the award winner.

The Award was founded by Colin Roderick, an Australian "writer, editor, academic and educator".

== Award winners ==
=== 2020s ===
- 2025: Khin Myint, Fragile Creatures : A Memoir
- 2024: Melissa Lucashenko, Edenglassie
- 2023: Sarah Holland-Batt, The Jaguar
- 2022: Emily Bitto, Wild Abandon
- 2021: Sofie Laguna, Infinite Splendours
- 2020: Sally Young, Paper Emperors: The rise of Australia’s newspaper empires

=== 2010s ===
- 2019: Robert Drewe, The True Colour of the Sea
- 2018: Jock Serong, On the Java Ridge
- 2017: Josephine Wilson, Extinctions
- 2016: Gail Jones, A Guide to Berlin
- 2015: Not Awarded
- 2014: Michael Wilding, Wild Bleak Bohemia : Marcus Clarke, Adam Lindsay Gordon and Henry Kendall - A Documentary
- 2013: Ashley Hay, The Railwayman's Wife & Stephen Edgar, Eldershaw
- 2012: Thomas Keneally, The Daughters of Mars
- 2011: Gillian Mears, Foal's Bread
- 2010: Karen Kissane, Worst of Days: Inside the Black Saturday Firestorm

=== 2000s ===
- 2009: Michael Cathcart, The Water Dreamers
- 2008: Graham Freudenberg, Churchill and Australia & James Boyce, Van Diemen's Land
- 2007: Malcolm Knox, Jamaica
- 2006: Deborah Robertson, Careless
- 2005: Peter Temple, The Broken Shore
- 2004: Alan Wearne, The Lovemakers & Tim Winton, The Turning
- 2003: Thomas Keneally, The Tyrant's Novel
- 2002: Don Watson, Recollections of a Bleeding Heart: A Portrait of Paul Keating PM
- 2001: Peter Rose, Rose Boys
- 2000: Peter Carey, True History of the Kelly Gang

=== 1990s ===
- 1999: Christopher Koch, Out of Ireland
- 1998: Robert Dessaix, (And So Forth)
- 1997: Peter Edwards, A Nation at War
- 1996: Tim Flannery, Roger Martin and Alexandra Szalay, Illustrator Peter Schouten, Tree Kangaroos
- 1995: Judy Cassab, Diaries
- 1994: Patrick Buckridge, The Scandalous Penton: A Biography of Brian Penton
- 1993: Cassandra Pybus, Gross Moral Turpitude: The Orr Case Reconsidered
- 1992: Ruth Park, A Fence Around the Cuckoo
- 1991: Joan Dugdale, Struggle of Memory
- 1990: Roland Griffiths-Marsh, Sixpenny Soldier

=== 1980s ===
- 1989: Chris Symons, John Bishop: A Life for Music
- 1988: Peter Carey, Oscar and Lucinda
- 1987: Nancy Phelan, Home Is the Sailor and the Best of Intentions
- 1986: Fr Tom Boland, James Duhig
- 1985: John Gunn, The Defeat of Distance: Qantas 1919-1939
- 1984: Alan Gould, The Man Who Stayed Below
- 1983: Dudley McCarthy, Gallipoli to the Somme
- 1982: Geoffrey Serle, John Monash: A Biography
- 1981: Gavin Souter, A Company of Heralds
- 1980: Allan Grocott, Convicts, Clergymen and Churches

=== 1970s ===
- 1979: Thea Astley, Hunting the Wild Pineapple
- 1978: Leslie Rees, History of Australian Drama
- 1977: Alan Marshall, The Complete Stories of Alan Marshall
- 1976: Gavin Souter, Lion and Kangaroo
- 1975: Denis Murphy, TJ Ryan
- 1974: David Malouf, Neighbours in a Thicket : Poems
- 1973: Dorothy Green, Ulysses Bound: Henry Handel Richardson and Her Fiction
- 1972: Sir Keith Hancock, Discovering Monaro
- 1971: Geoffrey Serle, The Rush to Be Rich
- 1970: Margaret Lawrie, Myths and Legends of Torres Strait

=== 1960s ===
- 1969: Francis Webb, Collected Poems
- 1968: Gavin Souter, A Peculiar People
- 1967: Douglas Stewart, Collected Poems 1936–1967

== Shortlisted works ==
=== 2020s ===
The Margaret and Colin Roderick Literary Award shortlists
Year	Author	Title	Result	Ref.
2024	Trent Dalton	Lola in the Mirror	Shortlisted	
2024	Aisha Dow and Melissa Cunningham	Life as We Knew It: the Extraordinary Story of Australia's Pandemic	Shortlisted	
2024	Kate Grenville	Restless Dolly Maunder	Shortlisted	
2024	Rebecca Lim	Two Sparrowhawks in a Lonely Sky	Shortlisted	
2024	Amanda Lohrey	The Conversation	Shortlisted	
2024	Rachelle Unreich	A Brilliant Life	Shortlisted	
2024	Alexis Wright	Praiseworthy	Shortlisted	
2024	Melissa Lucashenko	Edenglassie	Winner	
2024	Bradley Christmas	Saltwater Boy	Longlisted	
2024	Sally Hepworth	Darling Girls	Longlisted	
2024	Red Room Poetry	A Line in the Sand: 20 years of Red Room Poetry	Longlisted	
2024	Allison Tait	The First Summer of Callie McGee	Longlisted	
2024	Ellen van Neerven	Personal Score	Longlisted	
2024	Sally Young	Media Monsters: the Transformation of Australia's Newspaper Empires	Longlisted	
2025	Garry Disher	Sanctuary	Shortlisted	
2025	Jane Godwin	Look Me in the Eye	Shortlisted	
2025	Gail Jones	One Another	Shortlisted	
2025	Leah Kaminsky	Disorders of the Blood	Shortlisted	
2025	Khin Myint	Fragile Creatures	Winner	
2025	Lainie Anderson	The Death of Dora Black	Longlisted	
2025	Robbie Arnott	Dusk	Longlisted	
2025	Danielle Binks	Six Summers of Tash Leopold	Longlisted	
2025	Darren McCullum	The Wobbly Bike	Longlisted	
2025	John Wayne Parr	The Fighter	Longlisted	
2026	Evelyn Araluen	The Rot	Shortlisted	
2026	Aaron Fa'Aoso & Michelle Scott Tucker with Lyn White	Spirit of the Crocodile	Shortlisted	
2026	Glen Farmer Illortaminni	Tiwi in Paris	Shortlisted	
2026	Natalie Harkin	Apron-Sorrow / Sovereign-Tea	Shortlisted	
2026	Raaza Jamshed	What Kept You?	Shortlisted	
2026	Hannah Kent	Always Home, Always Homesick: A Memoir	Shortlisted	
2026	Tony Birch	Pictures of You	Longlisted	
2026	Nicole Crowe	The Washup	Longlisted	
2026	Garry Disher	Mischance Creek	Longlisted	
2026	Megan Morais, Lucy Nampijinpa Martin, Peggy Nampijinpa Martin, Marilyn Nampijinpa Martin, Leah Nampijinpa Martin, Helen Napurrurla Morton, Janet Nakamarra Long, Maisie Napaljarri Kitson, Maureen Nampijinpa O’Keefe, Clarrie Kemarr Long, Jeannie Nampijinpa Presley, Marjorie Nampijinpa Brown, Selina Napanangka Williams, Myfany Turpin	Yawulyu: Art and Song in Warlpiri Women’s Ceremony	Longlisted	
2026	Omar Musa	Fierceland	Longlisted	
2026	Leonie Norrington, Merrkiyawuy Ganambarr-Stubbs, Djawa Burarrwanga and Djawundil Maymuru	A Piece of Red Cloth	Longlisted	
2026	Josephine Rowe	Little World	Longlisted	
2026	Grace Yee	Joss: a History	Longlisted	
