= 1978 in Australian literature =

This article presents a list of the historical events and publications of Australian literature during 1978.

== Events ==
- Jessica Anderson won the 1978 Miles Franklin Award for Tirra Lirra by the River
- The Anne Elder Award for poetry is awarded for the first time

== Major publications ==
=== Books ===
- Jessica Anderson – Tirra Lirra by the River
- Nancy Cato – All the Rivers Run
- David Malouf – An Imaginary Life
- Christopher Koch – The Year of Living Dangerously
- George Turner – Transit of Cassidy

=== Science fiction and fantasy ===
- A. Bertram Chandler — To Keep the Ship
- David Lake — The Gods of Xuma, or, Barsoom Revisited
- George Turner – Beloved Son

=== Crime and mystery ===
- Nicholas Hasluck — Quarantine

=== Children's and young adult fiction ===
- Peter Pavey – One Dragon's Dream
- Joan Phipson – Keep Calm
- Patricia Wrightson – The Dark Bright Water

=== Poetry ===
- David Campbell — "Lizard and Stone"
- Lee Cataldi — Invitation to a Marxist Lesbian Party
- Bruce Dawe — Sometimes Gladness: Collected Poems 1954–1978
- Rosemary Dobson – "The Three Fates"
- Jennifer Maiden — Birthstones

=== Drama ===
- Ron Blair – Marx

=== Non-fiction ===
- Patsy Adam-Smith – The ANZACS
- Mary Durack – The End of Dreaming
- Wendy Lowenstein – Weevils in the Flour
- Elyne Mitchell – Light Horse: The Story of Australia's Mounted Troops

== Awards and honours ==
=== Order of Australia ===
- Margaret Hasluck appointed Dame of the Order of Australia (AD) for "pre-eminent achievement in the fields of literature and history and for extraordinary and meritorious public service to Australia".

=== Lifetime achievement ===
Award	Author
Christopher Brennan Award	Rosemary Dobson
Patrick White Award	Gwen Harwood

=== Literary ===
Award	Author	Title	Publisher
The Age Book of the Year Award	Christopher Koch	The Year of Living Dangerously	Nelson
ALS Gold Medal	No award		
Colin Roderick Award	Leslie Rees	History of Australian Drama	Angus & Robertson

=== Fiction ===
Award	Author	Title	Publisher
The Age Book of the Year Award	Christopher Koch	The Year of Living Dangerously	Nelson
Miles Franklin Award	Jessica Anderson	Tirra Lirra by the River	Macmillan

=== Children and Young Adult ===
Award	Category	Author	Title	Publisher
Children's Book of the Year Award	Older Readers	Patricia Wrightson	The Ice is Coming	Hutchinson
Children's Book of the Year Award	Picture Book	Jenny Wagner, illustrated by Ron Brooks	John Brown, Rose and the Midnight Cat	Viking Kestrel

=== Science fiction and fantasy ===
Award	Category	Author	Title	Publisher
Australian SF Achievement Award	Best Australian Science Fiction	Cherry Wilder	The Luck of Brin's Five	Atheneum

=== Poetry ===
Award	Author	Title	Publisher
Anne Elder Award	Lee Cataldi	Invitation to a Marxist Lesbian Party	Wild & Woolley
Grace Leven Prize for Poetry	Bruce Dawe	Sometimes Gladness: Collected Poems 1954–1978	Longman Cheshire

=== Drama ===
Award	Author	Title
AWGIE Award for Stage	David Williamson	The Club

=== Non-fiction ===
Award	Author	Title	Publisher
The Age Book of the Year Award	Patsy Adam-Smith	The ANZACS	Nelson

== Births ==
A list, ordered by date of birth (and, if the date is either unspecified or repeated, ordered alphabetically by surname) of births in 1978 of Australian literary figures, authors of written works or literature-related individuals follows, including year of death.

- 28 December — Holly Throsby, novelist and musician

Unknown date

- Brett McBean, horror, thriller and speculative fiction writer
- Fiona McFarlane, novelist and short story writer
- Andrew O'Connor, novelist

== Deaths ==
A list, ordered by date of death (and, if the date is either unspecified or repeated, ordered alphabetically by surname) of deaths in 1978 of Australian literary figures, authors of written works or literature-related individuals follows, including year of birth.

- 9 March – John K. Ewers, novelist, poet, schoolteacher and short story writer (born 1904)
- 16 April – Barbara Vernon, playwright, screenwriter and radio announcer (born 1916)
- 23 May – Rose Lindsay, artist's model, author, and printmaker (born 1885)
- 15 June – Paul McGuire, author, public servant and diplomat (born 1903)
- 20 July – Velia Ercole, short story writer and novelist (born 1903)
- 23 July – T. Inglis Moore, writer, anthologist and academic (born 1901)
- 24 July – Annie Rattray Rentoul, children's poet and story writer (born 1882)
- 27 September – Margaret Horder, artist and children's book illustrator (born 1903)
- 7 December – Helen Haenke, poet, playwright and artist (born 1916)

== See also ==
- 1978 in Australia
- 1978 in literature
- 1978 in poetry
- List of years in Australian literature
- List of years in literature
