= 1903 in Australian literature =

This article presents a list of the historical events and publications of Australian literature during 1903.

== Books ==
- Louis Becke – Helen Adair
- Guy Boothby
  - Connie Burt
  - The Countess Londa
  - The League of the Twelve
  - A Two-Fold Inheritance
- Joseph Furphy – Such Is Life
- E.W. Hornung – Denis Dent
- Rosa Praed — Fugitive Anne: A Romance of the Unexplored Bush

== Short stories ==
- Steele Rudd – Our New Selection
- Ethel Turner – Betty and Co

== Poetry ==
- C. J. Dennis – "'Urry!"
- George Essex Evans – "The Wayfarers"
- Mary Gilmore – "Marri'd"
- Henry Kendall – Poems of Henry Clarence Kendall
- Henry Lawson
  - "A Voice from the City"
  - "The Wander-Light"
- Louisa Lawson
  - "The Digger's Daughter"
  - "The Hour is Come"
  - "A Reverie"
- Breaker Morant – "When Stock Go By"
- Bernard O'Dowd – Dawnward?
- Will H. Ogilvie – Hearts of Gold and Other Verses
- A.B. Paterson
  - "Riders in the Stand"
  - "Saltbush Bill on the Patriarchs"

== Biography ==
- Ada Cambridge – Thirty Years in Australia

== Births ==
A list, ordered by date of birth (and, if the date is either unspecified or repeated, ordered alphabetically by surname) of births in 1903 of Australian literary figures, authors of written works or literature-related individuals follows, including year of death.

- 2 April — Dora Birtles, novelist, short-story writer, poet and travel writer (died 1992)
- 3 April – Paul McGuire, diplomat and novelist (died 1978)
- 15 July — Robert Close, novelist (died 1995 in Majorca, Spain)
- 22 July – Betty Roland, journalist and writer for children (died 1996)
- 24 September – Lennie Lower, writer (died 1947)
- 15 October – Pixie O'Harris, poet and writer for children (died 1991)
- 29 October – Olive Pell, librarian and poet (died 2002)

Unknown date

- Velia Ercole, short story writer and novelist (died 1978)
- Lyndall Hadow, short story writer and journalist (died 1976)
- Margaret Horder, artist and children's book illustrator (died 1978)
- F. B. Vickers, novelist (died 1985)

== Deaths ==
A list, ordered by date of death (and, if the date is either unspecified or repeated, ordered alphabetically by surname) of deaths in 1903 of Australian literary figures, authors of written works or literature-related individuals follows, including year of birth.

- 12 March – Leontine Cooper, essayist and short story writer (born 1837)
- 16 March – Aeneas J. Gunn, pastoralist and writer (born 1862)
- 15 August – William Barak, writer (born ca. 1824)

== See also ==
- 1903 in Australia
- 1903 in literature
- 1903 in poetry
- List of years in literature
- List of years in Australian literature
