= Taking Shelter =

1989 novel by Australian writer Jessica Anderson

- Author: Jessica Anderson
- Language: English
- Genre: Fiction
- Publication date: 1989
- Publication place: Australia
- Media type: Print
- Pages: 232 pp.
- ISBN: 0670829501
- Preceded by: Stories from the Warm Zone
- Followed by: One of the Wattle Birds

Taking Shelter (1989) is a novel by Australian writer Jessica Anderson. It was originally published by Penguin Books in Australia in 1989.

== Synopsis ==
Set in Sydney in the late 1980s the novel follows Beth who breaks off her engagement to Miles when she discovers he is gay, and then plunges into a passionate and uneasy affair with Marcus.

== Critical reception ==
Veronica Sen, writing in The Canberra Times, noted: "In her most recent novel Jessica Anderson explores contemporary Sydney where the pace of life exacerbates the moral confusion, family conflict and personal stress so characteristic of modern society...In her witty portraiture of the young and not-so-young confronting problems of freedom and responsibility and self-understanding, Anderson demonstrates what she sees as the primary function of literature: the need to engage, to entertain. In the realm of storytelling she does, indeed, 'make something' of value."

== Publication history ==
After its original publication in 1989 in Australia by publisher Penguin Books the novel was later reprinted as follows:

- Viking, Australia, 1990
- Untapped, Australian, 2021

== Awards ==
- Miles Franklin Award, shortlisted 1991

== See also ==
- 1989 in Australian literature
