= Andrew Hutchinson =

Andrew Hutchinson may refer to:

- Andrew Hutchinson (ice hockey) (born 1980), American ice hockey defenseman
- Andrew Hutchinson (author) (born 1979), Australian writer
- Andrew Hutchinson (wrestler), British wrestler
- Andy Hutchinson (born 1992), English footballer

== See also ==
- Andrew Hutchison (born 1937), Primate of the Anglican Church of Canada
- Drew Hutchison (born 1990), American baseball pitcher
- Drew Hutchison (rugby league) (born 1995), Australian rugby league player
