= Tirra Lirra by the River =

1978 novel by Jessica Anderson

- First edition
- Author: Jessica Anderson
- Cover artist: The Presentation by Charles Blackman c1959
- Language: English
- Genre: Novel
- Publisher: Macmillan, Australia
- Publication date: 1978
- Publication place: Australia
- Media type: Paperback
- Pages: 141
- ISBN: 0-333-25133-4
- OCLC: 5938300
- Dewey Decimal: 823
- LC Class: PZ4.A54736 Ti 1978 PR9619.3.A57
- Preceded by: The Commandant
- Followed by: The Impersonators

Tirra Lirra by the River is a novel by Australian writer Jessica Anderson. First published in 1978, it won the Miles Franklin Award that year. It is included in Carmen Callil and Colm Tóibín's 1999 collection The Modern Library: The Best 200 Novels in English since 1950 (Picador 1999. ISBN 0-330-34182-0).

== Plot ==
Nora Porteous is from a tightly knit small-town family in Australia. After getting married, she finds herself in a stifling Sydney suburb and difficult marriage. Out of courage and desperation, she travels to London, where she tries to become the woman she wants to be.

== Cultural references ==
The book's title is taken from Alfred, Lord Tennyson's poem, "The Lady of Shalott", part 3, stanza 4:

From the bank and from the river
He flashed into the crystal mirror,
'Tirra lirra,' by the river

Sang Sir Lancelot.

== Critical reception ==
Hope Hewitt in The Canberra Times commented, "The limited round of small-town life is vividly recalled in incidents dramatically presented against the colour, smell and taste of the Australian setting. So is the frustration of being a girl, short-of money, untrained for anything, destined only for marriage... The book is universal in theme, local only in detail. Though short it is deceptively rich as threads weave together and the overtones of language and the significance of the time-shifts register in our minds. The restrained artistry of Jessica Anderson's construction is exceptional in any literature."

"Finely honed structurally and tightly textured, it's a wry, romantic story that should make Anderson's American reputation and create a demand for her other work." - The Washington Post

"There may be a better novel than Tirra Lirra by the River this year, but I doubt it." - Cleveland Plain Dealer

"Subtle, rich, and seductive, this beautifully written novels casts a spell of delight upon the reader." Library Journal

== Film adaptation ==
Australian film producer Margaret Fink spent ten years attempting to adapt the novel for filmbut was unsuccessful. Cate Blanchett, still at the beginning of her careers, was cast in the title role.

== Awards ==
- Miles Franklin Award 1978, winner
- FAW ANA Literature Award 1978, winner
- Australian Book Review Fan Poll 2010, shortlisted

== See also ==
- 1978 in Australian literature
- Middlemiss.org

Awards and achievements
Preceded by Swords and Crowns and Rings	Miles Franklin Award recipient 1978	Succeeded by A Woman of the Future
