= Homesickness (novel) =

1980 novel by Australian writer Murray Bail

- Author: Murray Bail
- Language: English
- Genre: Fiction
- Publisher: Macmillan
- Publication date: 1980
- Publication place: Australia
- Media type: Print
- Pages: 371 pp.
- ISBN: 0333298969
- Preceded by: -
- Followed by: Holden's Performance

Homesickness (1980) is a novel by Australian writer Murray Bail. It was originally published by Macmillan in Australia in 1980.

It won both The Age Book of the Year Award and The Age Book of the Year Fiction Awards in 1980. It shared both awards with David Ireland's novel A Woman of the Future.

== Synopsis ==
The novel follows a group of thirteen Australian travelling together on a package tour that takes in Africa, England, Ecuador, New York and Moscow.

== Awards ==
- co-winner The Age Book of the Year Awards — Fiction 1980
- co-winner The Age Book of the Year 1980

== Critical reception ==
Suzanne Edgar, writing in The Canberra Times noted: "The group of Australians abroad, their attitudes and tastes are satirised and sent up from the superior viewpoint of the artist-observer: blind Kaddok is always taking photographs, while socially withdrawn Shiela sends hundreds of post-cards. Each tourist is tabbed by one or two stereotyped attributes that do no more than narrowly differentiate the one from the other...Bail disdains the dun-coloured realism of much Australian writing but his own prose, while certainly unrealistic, is not so psychedelic."

In a letter to the Swedish critic Ingmar Björkstén, Patrick White called Homesickness, "a most original & imaginative novel. We actually have some writers at last. Not much else can be said for Australia at the moment."

== Publication history ==
After its original publication in 1980 in Australia by publisher Macmillan, the novel was later published as follows:

- Penguin Books, Australia, 1981
- Faber and Faber, UK 1986
- Text Publishing, Australia, 1998 and 2012
- Farrar Straus & Giroux, USA, 1999

== See also ==
- 1980 in Australian literature
