= The Pages (novel) =

Book by Murray Bail

- First edition
- Author: Murray Bail
- Language: English
- Publisher: Text Publishing
- Publication date: 2008
- Publication place: Australia
- Media type: Print (hardback & paperback)
- Pages: 199
- ISBN: 9781921351464
- Preceded by: Eucalyptus
- Followed by: The Voyage

The Pages is a 2008 novel by Australian novelist Murray Bail.

== Plot summary ==
An Australian bush philosopher, Wesley Antill, dies, leaving behind a vast collection of philosophical works. His will indicates that it should be published, so Antill's siblings arrange for Erica, a philosopher, and Sophie, a psychoanalyst, to examine the work and decide if it is actually publishable.

== Reviews ==
- The Guardian
- The New York Times

== Awards and nominations ==
- 2009 shortlisted Miles Franklin Literary Award
- 2009 shortlisted Victorian Premier's Literary Awards — The Vance Palmer Prize for Fiction
- 2009 shortlisted Prime Minister's Literary Awards — Fiction
