= An Ordinary Lunacy =

Book by Jessica Anderson

- First edition
- Author: Jessica Anderson
- Language: English
- Genre: Literary fiction
- Publisher: Macmillan
- Publication date: 1963
- Publication place: Australia
- Media type: Print
- Pages: 251pp
- Preceded by: –
- Followed by: The Last Man's Head

An Ordinary Lunacy (1963) is a novel by Australian writer Jessica Anderson.

== Story outline ==
After being attracted to Isobel Purdy at a party, lawyer David Byfield finds himself defending her in court after she is charged with the murder of her husband. His defense is successful and the relationship between the two begins to blossom. But Isobel is a complicated woman and the relationship also becomes tangled and complicated.

== Critical reception ==
Hope Hewitt in The Canberra Times, commenting on the 1988 re-issue of the novel, noted: "It is set in present-day Sydney; Anderson has an understated talent for evoking Sydney, and it docs not matter for this study of personal relationships, caught at the focus point of an apparent suicide, that 25 years have gone by. Sydney life is evoked subtly, assumed as being within the experience of her intelligent cosmopolitan readers; it is not insistent, but it is important."

The Oxford Companion to Australian Literature described the novel as combining "penetrating observation of a sophisticated segment of Sydney society with exploration of an obsessive passion."

== See also ==
- 1963 in Australian literature
