= Holden's Performance =

1987 novel by Australian writer Murray Bail

- Author: Murray Bail
- Language: English
- Genre: Fiction
- Publisher: Viking
- Publication date: 1987
- Publication place: Australia
- Media type: Print
- Pages: 353
- ISBN: 0670816639
- Preceded by: Homesickness
- Followed by: Eucalyptus

Holden's Performance (1987) is a novel by Australian writer Murray Bail. It was originally published by Viking in Australia in 1987.

== Synopsis ==
Covering the period from World War II through to the mid-1960s this novel follows the life of Holden Shadbolt. After the war Shadbolt moves from his native Adelaide to Sydney where he becomes a driver for Senator (and then government Minister) Sid Hoadley, and later a bodyguard for visiting foreign heads of state.

== Critical reception ==
Writing in The Canberra Times reviewer Marion Halligan noted: "Murray Bail's latest novel is about language. He proudly claims that it is not realistic, and this is the way it isn't. It turns words into the things they describe, it makes metaphors literal, it puts sound before sense, thus giving sense an extra dimension...I find it the kind of book which amazes and delights while I am reading it, but does not inspire a desire to pick it up once I've put it down. Whereas lesser novels have made me care quite passionately about what happens in them, this didn't. Perhaps because it is so very successful in portraying the great Australian emptiness of its protagonist."

A reviewer at the "complete review" website found: "Holden's Performance is both dense and loose, with Bail capturing an era in a single sentence and yet also floating across years and allowing spiraling narrative digressions. He seems, ultimately, not certain enough what to do with Holden, who still feels unformed at the novel's end, only 34, packed off for grander things. The novel meanders amiably most of the time, yet one misses a firmer payoff...Still, in its details Bail manages a great deal. The unlikely pieces — a lost toe, a vomit stain, the female form — are often wonderfully put to unexpected use. And he has a turn of language that, while not always successful, is generally most entertaining."

== Awards ==
- Miles Franklin Award, shortlisted 1987
- Victorian Premier's Prize for Fiction, winner 1988

== Publication history ==
After its original publication in 1987 in Australia by publisher Viking Press the novel was later published as follows:

- Faber & Faber, UK, 1987
- Picador, USA, 1987
- Penguin, Australia, 1998
- Text Publishing, Australia, 1999
- Harvill Press, UK, 2000

== See also ==
- 1987 in Australian literature
