= A Song of the Republic =

1887 poem by Australian writer Henry Lawson

- by Henry Lawson
- Original title: Sons of the South
- Written: 1887
- First published in: The Bulletin
- Country: Australia
- Language: English
- Publication date: 1 October 1887

Full text
- A Song of the Republic at Wikisource

"A Song of the Republic" (1887) is a poem by Australian poet Henry Lawson. It was the author's first published poem.

It was originally published in The Bulletin on 1 October 1887, and subsequently reprinted in other newspapers and periodicals and a number of Australian poetry anthologies.

== Critical reception ==
Writing an overview of the author's career in 1919, Bertram Stevens said of the poem: "Monarchs were the traditional symbols of tyranny, so much of the unrest of the time expressed itself as republicanism; the average respectable citizen, by the way, regarded socialism, republicanism, communism, and anarchism as the same thing and all anathema. Lawson set forth the aspirations of many of the submerged in a fiery 'Song of the Republic'.

The Oxford Companion to Australian Literature states that "A Song of the Republic" is "a stirring appeal to the 'Sons of the South' (the original title) to bring about a new social order."

== Publication history ==
After the poem's initial publication in The Bulletin it was reprinted as follows:

- The Essential Henry Lawson : The Best Works of Australia's Greatest Writer edited Brian Kiernan, Currey O'Neil, 1982
- A Campfire Yarn : Henry Lawson Complete Works 1885-1900 edited by Leonard Cronin, Lansdowne, 1984
- The Poet's Discovery : Nineteenth Century Australia in Verse edited by Richard Douglas Jordan and Peter Pierce, Melbourne University Press, 1990
- Henry Lawson edited by Geoffrey Blainey, Text Publishing, 2002

== Notes ==
- "The circumstances of its composition, acceptance and publication are recorded in Lawson's 'A Fragment of Autobiography'."

== See also ==
- 1887 in Australian literature
- 1887 in poetry
