= The Chantic Bird =

1968 novel by David Ireland

- First edition
- Author: David Ireland
- Language: English
- Genre: Literary fiction
- Publisher: Heinemann, London
- Publication date: 1968
- Media type: Print
- Pages: 201 pp
- Preceded by: –
- Followed by: The Unknown Industrial Prisoner

The Chantic Bird (1968) is the debut novel by Australian writer David Ireland.

== Plot summary ==
The novel follows the story of a young, psychotic teenage boy living on the fringes of society in Sydney. His only interactions with the world are through a suburban family, the children who live there and Bee the woman who cares for them.

== Critical reception ==
Virginia Osborne, reviewing the novel in The Canberra Times, found the novel "impressive" and noted: "The country is vividly described by Mr Ireland. The only jarring note is the baby talk indulged in by the children which is too cloying. But this apart, it has the same aura of inescapable tragedy as the film 'Bonnie and Clyde' and should appeal to the same public."

Michael Wilding found the novel less than impressive: "There is never any firm establishment of his idiom. The language is a shaky mixture of slang and routine literary, overlaid with the odd portentous gesture at establishing some metaphysical cum-our-violent-civilization's angst. There is no meaningful exploration of character or social type nor is there any insight offered into the delinquent mind. The psychology is rudimentary and literary, and the novel's only function is a titillating or emetic one."

== See also ==
- 1968 in Australian literature

== Notes ==
Text Publishing re-issued the novel in March 2015 as part of their "Text Classics" series. The book was issued with an introduction by critic Geordie Williamson titled "Australian Psycho".
