= Richard Mason (film producer) =

Australian film producer and director

Richard Mason (1926–2002) was an Australian film producer and director.

He was born on the South Coast of New South Wales, the son of a parson. During the Second World War he guarded Italian Prisoners of War.

After the war he joined Sydney's Mercury Theatre as an actor, co-starring in Molière's play, The Imaginary Invalid. However, he soon moved to film, starting as a wardrobe assistant for Eureka Stockade (1949), then as an assistant at the Colorfilm lab, before joining the Commonwealth Film Unit (now Screen Australia).

He remained with the Commonwealth Film Unit, which then became Film Australia, for many years before resigning in 1978 over the Australian government's political censorship of The Unknown Industrial Prisoner.

Once independent, he produced Winter of Our Dreams (1981), Far East (1982), and One Night Stand (1984).

Mason died in Sydney on 22 November 2002.

== A focus on Australian Aborigines ==
A series of short films exploring themes of Aboriginal life in Australia in the 20th century:

- The Change at Groote (1968), a film exploring how an isolated Aboriginal community (of Groote Eylandt in the Gulf of Carpentaria) coped with the discovery of Manganese on their land.
- The Islanders (1968), documenting the lives of the Torres Strait Islander people.
- God Knows Why But It Works (1976); an Australian doctor strives to help the local Aboriginal population.
