= Archimedes and the Seagle =

1984 novel by David Ireland

- First edition
- Author: David Ireland
- Language: English
- Publisher: Viking Press
- Publication date: 1984
- Media type: Print (hardback & paperback)
- Pages: 228 pp
- ISBN: 067080309X
- Preceded by: City of Women
- Followed by: Bloodfather

Archimedes and the Seagle (1984) is a novel by Australian writer David Ireland. It won the ALS Gold Medal in 1985.

== Plot summary ==
The Archimedes of the title is a dog, an old red setter who has learnt to read and who philosophises about the world. In particular, he is fascinated by seagulls, and one in particular, who appears to soar like an eagle, hence the "seagle".

== Reviews ==
Veronica Sen in The Canberra Times noted: "An extraordinary thing about this novel is that while being defiantly a 'novel with a message' it has sufficient charm to invite reader co-operation. Somehow it's possible to go along with the ten qualities that Archimedes proposes for all living things, or his reflections on the real meaning of an open society and the spirit of Australia. If the dog sounds priggish, be not afraid. He has the capacity to love his imperfect family as well as another dog-person, Darling, whose eyes are 'untouched, can did and happy' and who bubbles and fizzes and is 'just perfect'." And she concluded: "...I was entranced by his novel's whimsical humour, its beautifully rhythmic language and its humane insights. As a recipe for living, whether by man or dog, this very personal book of hard-won knowledge could well be tried and found true."

== Awards and nominations ==
- 1985 – winner ALS Gold Medal
