= Eucalyptus (novel) =

1998 novel by Murray Bail

Eucalyptus: A Novel
- First edition
- Author: Murray Bail
- Language: English
- Publisher: Text Publishing
- Publication date: 1998
- Publication place: Australia
- Media type: Print (Hardback & Paperback)
- Pages: 264
- ISBN: 1-875847-63-4
- OCLC: 39355076
- Preceded by: Holden's Performance
- Followed by: The Pages

Eucalyptus is a 1998 novel by Australian novelist Murray Bail. The book won the 1999 Miles Franklin Award, the 1999 Commonwealth Writers' Prize and the 1999 ALS Gold Medal.

== Plot introduction ==
Eucalyptus tells the story of Ellen Holland, a young woman whose "speckled beauty" and unattainability become legend far beyond the rural western New South Wales town near the property where she grows up. Her protective father's obsession with collecting rare species of Eucalyptus trees leads him to propose a contest – the man who can correctly name all the species on his property shall win her hand in marriage.

== Thematic concerns ==
The novel contrasts a detailed, scientific classifying of Eucalyptus trees, with the story of Ellen told from a parodied fairy tale perspective. This fits well with Bail’s status as a writer of fiction and non-fiction.

The novel begins with a discussion of Australian culture “the poetic virtues which have their origins in the bush of being belted about by droughts, bushfires, smelly sheep and so on; and lets not forget the isolation, the exhausted shapeless women, the crude language, the always wide horizon, and the flies.” But concludes that: “it really doesn’t matter.” This sets a major theme for the novel to explore. The novel could easily be interpreted as a renegotiation of Australian identity. Bail at once glorifies Australian tradition and attacks the notion of “a sun burnt country”.

Ellen’s story begins with 'Once upon a time.' Ellen’s beauty is renowned across states and oceans.Holland, Ellen's father, a man who likes to plant trees. Mr. Cave is a brilliant, although boring, old man. Likewise the unnamed lover is a storyteller.

Each short story accelerates the narrative frame and is analyzed within the scientific eucalypt theme. This contrast is well implemented, maintaining flow and cohesion in spite of the fragmented medium.

The reader is encouraged to guess ahead at what the story may contain. “There once was a man on a property outside a one horse town, who couldn’t come to a decision about his daughter. He then made an unexpected decision. Incredible. For a while people talked of little else”. This encourages a responder to expect a feminist reading where his daughter is empowered.

Not so, instead, he designs a test in which a potential suitor must identify every eucalypt growing on his property. Ellen remains disenchanted with the whole scheme, as countless suitors try and fail at this test. This is until Mr. Cave, a botanical genius arrives. Cave appears to be the only man on earth capable of success. Tragically enough just as Cave nears his goal, Ellen finds her own love elsewhere.

== Adaptations ==
=== Film ===
A film version of Eucalyptus was once in the works and was highly publicised in the media, set to star Nicole Kidman and Russell Crowe. The film, whose budget was estimated sometimes at $15 million and sometimes at $25 million, was reportedly shut down by production company Fox Searchlight because of disputes between Crowe and director Jocelyn Moorhouse.

Talks began in early 2004; the production was originally intended to star Geoffrey Rush, Bryce Dallas Howard and Crowe, to be directed by Moorhouse, written by her and Michelle Joyner and produced by Uberto Pasolini and Lynda House. Howard was reportedly dropped from the project because Crowe reportedly did not want to act with someone outside his home-country, and Kidman subsequently joined. In early February 2005, Fox Searchlight announced that the film had been postponed to allow time for further work on the script.

Filming was set to commence in Bellingen, New South Wales, in February 2005, but was cancelled because of "irreconcilable differences" between Crowe (who was also executive producer) and Moorhouse. Sets costing $6.4 million had been built at Bellingen, and a studio established at nearby Coffs Harbour, had to be abandoned, film crew numbering around 80 had to be paid off and property rentals around the town cancelled. After rumours he would direct the project himself, Crowe was cited as preferring either Driving Miss Daisy director Bruce Beresford or Last Orders creator Fred Schepisi to helm the project.

=== Opera ===
The Australian-British composer Sir Jonathan Mills had been working on an operatic treatment of Eucalyptus since 2013. It had been commissioned in 2006 by Richard Hickox for Opera Australia. A concert version was presented at the 2024 Perth Festival, and staged that year by Michael Gow at the Brisbane Festival and in Melbourne.

== Awards and nominations ==
- 1999 Miles Franklin Award – winner
- 1999 Commonwealth Writers' Prize – winner Best Book
- 1999 ALS Gold Medal
