= 1887 in Australian literature =

This article presents a list of the historical events and publications of Australian literature during 1887.

== Books ==
- Francis Adams — Madeline Brown's Murderer (a.k.a. The Murder of Madeline Brown)
- Rolf Boldrewood — The Sphinx of Eaglehawk: A Tale of Old Bendigo
- Rosa Praed — The Bond of Wedlock : A Tale of London Life

== Poetry ==
- Francis Adams
  - "A Death at Sea"
  - "Gordon's Grave"
  - Poetical Works of Francis W L Adams: Complete Edition
- John Le Gay Brereton — The Triumph of Love
- Ada Cambridge
  - "An Answer"
  - "Fallen"
  - "Good-Bye"
  - "Honour"
  - Unspoken Thoughts
  - "What of the Night?"
- Ethel Castilla — "The Australian Girl"
- Victor Daley — "The Old Wife and the New"
- John Farrell — How He Died and Other Poems
- Henry Halloran — Poems, Odes, Songs
- Henry Lawson
  - "A Song of the Republic"
  - "The Wreck of Derry Castle"
- A. B. Paterson — "Only a Jockey"

== Short stories ==
- Edward Dyson — "A Profitable Pub" (a.k.a. "The Golden Shanty")

== Births ==
A list, ordered by date of birth (and, if the date is either unspecified or repeated, ordered alphabetically by surname) of births in 1887 of Australian literary figures, authors of written works or literature-related individuals follows, including year of death.

- 9 January — Sydney Ure Smith, publisher (died 1949)
- 10 January — Margaret Fane, novelist (died 1962)
- 24 January — Joice NanKivell Loch, (died 1982)
- 4 April — Tom Quilty, pastoralist and bush poet (died 1979)
- 29 May — Hal Gye, illustrator and poet (died 1967)
- 29 May — Alice Gore-Jones, poet (died 1961)
- 27 September — Frederick T. Macartney, poet and critic (died 1980)
- 26 November — Ella McFadyen, poet (died 1976)

== See also ==
- 1887 in Australia
- 1887 in literature
- 1887 in poetry
- List of years in Australian literature
- List of years in literature
