= Valerie Khoo =

Australian journalist

Valerie Khoo is the National Director of the Australian Writers' Centre which she established in 2005. The centre offers writing courses to the public in Sydney, Brisbane, Melbourne and Perth. She is also a writer, podcaster, visual artist and former journalist.

In 2018, Khoo was appointed the City of Sydney's Curator of the Sydney Lunar Festival. Khoo is the co-host of the long-running podcasts So You Want to be a Writer (with children's author Allison Tait) and So You Want to be a Photographer (with photographer Gina Milicia). She also hosts the podcast series New stories, Bold Legends: Stories from Sydney Lunar Festival.

Graduating from the University of Sydney with a Bachelor of Economics in 1991, Khoo has since worked as an accountant, in public relations, as a features writer for magazines, and as a freelance journalist. She is the author of six books. In 2000, she was awarded a Graduate Diploma in Communication from the University of Technology Sydney.

Khoo was born in Singapore and migrated to Sydney with her parents when she was four years old.

== Writing ==
As a journalist and editor, Khoo worked for various publishing houses including Pacific Magazines, Fairfax and ACP Magazines (now Bauer) in both Sydney and Singapore. She was a regular contributor to Fairfax's Enterprise site, writing on small to medium-sized business and entrepreneurs.

She is the author of several books, mostly focused on small business and career advice. Her most recent book was Power Stories: The 8 Stories You Must Tell to Build an Epic Business (Richmond, Vic. : John Wiley & Sons, 2013).

More recently, Khoo has worked as a visual artist.

== Social Enterprise ==
In 2002, with her friend Kylie Taylor, Khoo established Taylor & Khoo, a charity to assist Sunrise Angkor Children's Village, an orphanage in Cambodia. The social enterprise sold products manufactured in Cambodia, with proceeds going towards the orphanage. The venture wound down in 2008.

== Awards ==
Awards received by Khoo or her businesses/ventures/art:

- 2004 Family Circle Women Who Dare Awards
- 2005 Australian Humanitarian Award (Business category)
- 2005 Australia Post Small Business Awards Special Judges Commendation
- 2006 Anthill 10 Coolest Companies in Australia.
- 2008 Finalist Small Business Champion Awards (NSW)
- 2009 Australian Finalist in the Dell Small Business Excellence Awards
- 2010 Winner NSW Telstra Business Awards Micro-Business Category
- 2018 Finalist Kangaroo Valley Art Prize
