= The Glass Canoe =

Novel by David Ireland

- First edition
- Author: David Ireland
- Language: English
- Genre: Novel
- Publisher: Macmillan, Australia
- Publication date: 1976
- Publication place: Australia
- Media type: Print (Hardback & Paperback)
- Pages: 213
- ISBN: 0-333-21051-4
- OCLC: 2895871
- Dewey Decimal: 823
- LC Class: PZ4.I65 Gl PR9619.3.I674
- Preceded by: Burn
- Followed by: A Woman of the Future

The Glass Canoe (1976) is a novel by Australian author David Ireland. It won the Miles Franklin Award in 1976.

== Plot outline ==
The novel is about a man who spends his life at the pub, seeing the world through his beer glass – a glass canoe. The novel is told through the voice of Meat Man, a regular drinker at the Southern Cross hotel, who works as a groundsman at the local golf course.

== Critical reception ==
The book was published in a new edition in 2012 by Text Publishing; Nicolas Rothwell wrote in the introduction:

The book has traction. It pulls you in. It's the hard core. It's art, not entertainment; action, not plot. It's the lurking, dark beast of fear and beauty at the heart of Australian life. It is all we know, and all we seek to put behind us, and all that the literary world has struggled to evade and overcome. It has a geography, physical and social: it's what lies beyond the beach; Australia beyond the line of coastal suburbs and their aspirations. The set-up is simple. Ireland works this way: he disdains surface marks of coherence, he has no time for the long forms of narrative. It's fragments, for him, snatched scenes, glimpses that show all.

== See also ==
- 1976 in Australian literature
- The Glass Canoe, Middlemiss.org
