= The Unknown Industrial Prisoner =

1971 novel by David Ireland

- First edition
- Author: David Ireland
- Language: English
- Genre: Novel
- Publisher: Angus and Robertson, Australia
- Publication date: 1971
- Publication place: Australia
- Media type: Print (Hardback & Paperback)
- Pages: 379 pp
- Preceded by: The Chantic Bird
- Followed by: The Flesheaters

The Unknown Industrial Prisoner (1971) is a Miles Franklin Award-winning novel by Australian author David Ireland.

In 1978 a film version was planned, to be produced by Richard Mason and directed by Arch Nicholson, with Ken Cameron also working on it. Funding was from Film Australia. However, the Minister for Home Affairs Bob Ellicott cancelled the film on the grounds it was uncommercial, a rare instance of political interference in the Australian film industry.

== Critical reception ==
Helen Brown in The Canberra Times noted that the novel is "a big, good book with an important and timely theme and it should assure David Ireland a place in the front ranks of contemporary Australian writers. Yet my chewing was dogged and dutiful rather than enjoyable and the pages had a persistent tendency to stick in my throat...The writing is excellent, sliding naturally from tough, idiomatic Australian to occasional passages of great power and beauty. The ironic Australian tone of voice is at its best, the timing, the rhythm and the words exactly right. It is my guess David Ireland has put the true flavour of Australian English on the literary map."

== See also ==
- 1971 in Australian literature
- Middlemiss.org
