= The Sphinx of Eaglehawk: A Tale of Old Bendigo =

Novel by Australian writer Rolf Boldrewood

The Sphinx of Eaglehawk : A Tale of Old Bendigo
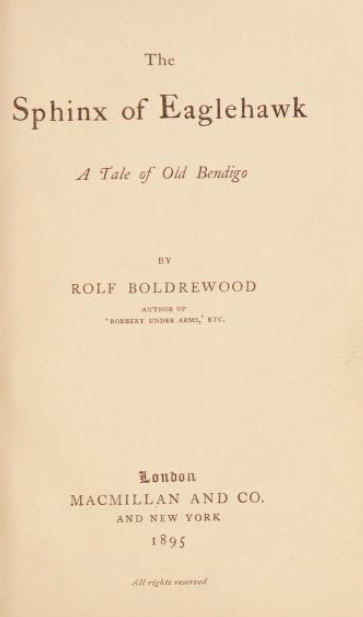
- Title page for The Sphinx of Eaglehawk: A Tale of Old Bendigo (1895 edition)
- Author: Rolf Boldrewood
- Language: English
- Genre: Fiction
- Publication date: 1887
- Publication place: Australia
- Media type: Print
- Preceded by: The Crooked Stick, or, Pollie's Probation
- Followed by: A Sydney-Side Saxon

The Sphinx of Eaglehawk: A Tale of Old Bendigo (1887) is a novel by Australian writer Rolf Boldrewood.

The novel was originally published in serial form in 5 weekly instalments in The Australasian between 19 November and 17 December 1887.

== Synopsis ==
The novel is set in the Victorian gold-mining town of Bendigo, in 1852, during the height of the gold-rush. The Sphinx, of the title, is a new barmaid in town who is persecuted by one of the gold miners.

== Critical reception ==
A reviewer in The Bulletin called the novel "a short tale of life on old Bendigo bowdlerised to suit respectable English families. The episodes are familiar, and the author has described them better before."

A writer in the South Australian Chronicle commented that the "novel is a story of gold digging on Bendigo in the days of 1852, and it is characterised by all the naturalness and fidelity to real life which have made Mr. Browne's previous works so thoroughly successful...Robberies, murders, conspiracies, and other spicy seasoning are added to the general ingredients of the book, and all together combine to make up a very clever and attractive novel."

== Publication history ==
After its original publication in 1887 in The Australasian the novel was published as follows:

- Macmillan, UK, 1895

== See also ==
- 1887 in Australian literature
