= Hunting the Wild Pineapple =

Short story collection by Thea Astley

- Author: Thea Astley
- Language: English
- Publisher: Nelson
- Publication date: 1979
- Publication place: Australia
- Media type: Print (Paperback)
- Pages: 175 pp
- ISBN: 0170054055
- Preceded by: A Kindness Cup
- Followed by: An Item from the Late News

Hunting the Wild Pineapple (1979) is a collection of short stories by Australian writer Thea Astley. It was published in paperback by Nelson Publishers in Sydney in 1979.

The collection includes 8 original stories by the author.

== Contents ==
- "North: Some Compass Readings: Eden"
- "The Curate Breaker"
- "Hunting the Wild Pineapple"
- "A Northern Belle"
- "Petals from Blown Roses..."
- "Ladies Only Ned Apply"
- "Write Me, Son, Write Me"
- "A Man Who is Tired of Swiper's Creek is Tired of Life"

== Synopsis ==
The 8 stories in this collection are all narrated by Leverson who has been seduced by North Queensland's beauty and strangeness. He observed both southern imports, as well as long-term Queensland residents, equally.

== Critical reception ==
Lyn Frost, writing in The Canberra Times noted that the collection "gives an award-winning Australian author full rein. Astley, a Queenslander, has returned there to write and discovered a whole new population...Astley conveys 'a lot of sad poetry' and humour about the place which is 'a kind of carpet-bagger's paradise'."

== Publication history ==
The collection was also published as follows:

- Penguin, Australia, 1981
- G. P. Putnam's Sons, USA, 1991

== Awards ==
The collection won the Colin Roderick Award in 1979.

== See also ==
- 1979 in Australian literature
