= Stories from the Warm Zone =

Short story collection by Jessica Anderson

- Author: Jessica Anderson
- Language: English
- Genre: Short story collection
- Publisher: Penguin
- Publication date: 1987
- Publication place: Australia
- Media type: Print
- Pages: 245 pp
- ISBN: 0140097082
- Preceded by: The Impersonators
- Followed by: Taking Shelter

Stories from the Warm Zone (1987) is a collection of short stories by Australian writer Jessica Anderson. It was published by Penguin Books in 1987.

The collection includes 8 stories by the author, all bar one ("Under the House") were published in this collection for the first time.

The collection is also known by the title Stories from the Warm Zone and Sydney Stories.

== Contents ==
- "Under the House"
- "The Appearance of Things"
- "Against the Wall"
- "The Way to Budjerra Heights"
- "The Aviator"
- "The Milk"
- "The Late Sunshine"
- "Outdoor Friends"

== Synopsis ==
The book is divided into two sections: the first details a number of anecdotes from Anderson's childhood involving her family, to all of whom she gives false names, which has been described as "her most poignant evocation of her childhood home"; the second part, less obviously autobiographical, sketches various lives and relationships against the backdrop of urban Sydney.

== Critical reception ==
Paul Salzmann, writing in Australian Book Review noted: "In keeping with Anderson's complex view of families, no easy division between the childhood 'warm zone' stories and the fracturing marriages of the Sydney stories should be made, despite the suggestion of the jacket blurb. The author explains that the sequence of stories set in Queensland, and seen through the eyes of a child, Bea, are what she calls 'autobiographical fiction'." He concluded: "This rewarding collection of stories will not disappoint readers who have come to expect the highest literary achievement from Jessica Anderson."

== Publication history ==
After the book's initial publication in Australia in 1987 it was reprinted as follows:

- Viking, USA, 1987
- Untapped, Australia, 2021

== Awards ==
- The Age Book of the Year Award, winner 1987

== See also ==
- 1987 in Australian literature
