= The World Repair Video Game =

Novel by David Ireland

- First edition
- Author: David Ireland
- Language: English
- Publisher: Island magazine
- Publication date: 2015
- Publication place: Australia
- Media type: Hardback

The World Repair Video Game (2015) is a novel by Australian author David Ireland.

The novel was serialised in five parts, then published as a limited edition hardback by Island magazine and was shortlisted in the Fiction Category of the 2016 Prime Minister's Literary Awards.

== Plot ==
This novel is about 42-year-old Kennard Stirling, son of a wealthy family, who has spurned his inheritance in favour of a small town on the rural New South Wales coast. He spends his days helping the elderly and needy members of the community, while in his spare time working on his own hobby: a project to rejuvenate various bush blocks, fertilised by the remains of murdered itinerants, drifters and economic losers that Stirling has judged not to offer anything to society.

== Critical reception ==
The Australian's chief literary critic, Geordie Williamson wrote: "In The World Repair Video Game, Ireland has written an impossible novel: one shriven entirely of the social. Yet in doing so he has revealed the illogic that underlies what we call economic rationalism. He has drawn our coming world in a clear and terrible light."

Nicolas Rothwell wrote in The Australian that The World Repair Video Game is "a precise, controlled exercise in horror writing and cryptic social commentary, elegantly written, unremittingly dark. The tale is simply done: we travel in the mind of a monologue-spinning, self-justifying serial killer, a man on a mission to cleanse the fallen world. As always when murder is in the air, the narrative has a disquieting drive, modulated by the serene clarity of Ireland’s prose."
