= A Woman of the Future =

1979 novel by David Ireland

- First US edition
- Author: David Ireland
- Language: English
- Genre: Novel
- Publisher: Penguin, Australia; George Braziller (US)
- Publication date: 1979
- Publication place: Australia
- Media type: Print (Paperback)
- Pages: 351pp
- ISBN: 0-14-005657-2
- OCLC: 9395876
- Preceded by: The Glass Canoe
- Followed by: City of Women

A Woman of the Future (1979) is a novel by Australian author David Ireland. It won the Miles Franklin Award in 1979 and was joint winner of the Age Book of the Year award in 1980.

As a result of this novel, Ireland was "being hailed as the successor to Patrick White and the antipodean rival of the great American satirist Kurt Vonnegut".

Originally published in 1979, it was re-issued in 2012 as part of the Text Publishing Text Classics series. This edition carried an introduction by Kate Jennings.

== Critical reception ==
On the announcement of the Miles Franklin Award win, The Canberra Times stated: " A Woman of the Future was rejected by Macmillans at first because it was too long and too complex or, as Mr Ireland put it yesterday, 'too incomprehensible' ". Following this, one of the award judges, Emeritus Professor Colin Roderick, described the book as "literary sewage", and stated it was "a dreadful, sex-ridden fantasy, doomed to oblivion."

Writing in 1980 for Woroni, Andrea Mitchell noted a

"different and more rewarding perspective on women in society" from the author. "In this novel Ireland has pinpointed the crisis of modern feminism by projecting it forward in one direction. Must feminism adjust to the mainstream of modern culture, training girls up to become pseudo-men in order to compete for power and privilege in an unequal and vicious society — or can it work to undermine such qualities and recreate the world with a human face?"

== Awards and nominations ==
- 1979 winner Miles Franklin Literary Award
- 1980 joint winner The Age Book of the Year Award — "Book of the Year", with Homesickness by Murray Bail
- 1980 commended New South Wales Premier's Literary Awards — Fiction
- 1981 highly commended National Book Council Award for Australian Literature

== See also ==
- 1979 in Australian literature
