= Olive Pell =

Australian librarian and poet

- Born: 29 October 1903; Kalgoorlie, Western Australia
- Died: 23 January 2002 (aged 98); Perth, Western Australia
- Occupations: Librarian; poet

Olive Alicia Ades Pell (29 October 1903 – 23 January 2002) was an Australian librarian and poet.

== Life and career ==
Olive Pell was born in Kalgoorlie, Western Australia on 29 October 1903. She was educated at St Hilda's Anglican School for Girls in Perth from 1916 to 1918.

She joined the University of Western Australia as a librarian in 1942 and remained in the role for 27 years. She joined the Western Australian branch of the Fellowship of Australian Writers in 1940 and served as president in 1969–1970. Her contribution to that organisation was recognised by the award of honorary life membership in 1979.

Pell's poetry was published in the Jindyworobak Anthology for 1944, 1945, 1947, 1949, 1951, 1952 and 1953. "Monte Bello" was her first poem to be published in The Bulletin. It was subsequently selected from 1,000 contributions for inclusion in Australia Writes: An Anthology (1953) and later appeared in The Fremantle Press Anthology of Western Australian Poetry (2017).

Pell died on 23 January 2002 in Perth, Western Australia.

Her papers are held in the State Library of Western Australia.

== Selected works ==
=== Poetry ===
- Gold to Win, Hawthorn Press, 1964
- I'd Rather Be a Fig, Hawthorn Press, 1977
- Patient Reaction, WordWorks Express, 1991

=== Nonfiction ===
- Gold in the Veins: An autobiography of Olive Pell 1903–2002, 2002
