= Brooke Davis (writer) =

Australian writer

- Born: 1980 (age 45–46); Bellbrae, Victoria, Australia
- Education: Curtin University, PhD, Creative Writing (2013); University of Canberra, Bachelor of Communication (Hons), Professional Writing and Media Production (2004)
- Occupation: Writer
- Writing career
- Notable works: Lost and Found (2014, Hachette Australia)
- Website: twitter.com/thisisbrooked

Brooke Davis is a novelist and the author of the best selling novel Lost & Found (2014). She grew up in Bellbrae, Victoria. Davis currently resides in Perth, Western Australia.

== Career and education ==
Brooke Davis has worked as a travel writer, editor, and bookseller. Davis graduated with an honours degree from the University of Canberra (2004), winning the Allen & Unwin Prize for Prose Fiction, the Verandah Prose Prize, and the University Medal. Davis completed her PhD at Curtin University of Technology in 2013. During her time there, Davis received the 2009 Bobbie Cullen Memorial Award for Women Writers, the 2009 AAWP Prize for Best Postgraduate Paper, and the 2011 Postgraduate Queensland Writing Prize. Davis' thesis investigated how the process of grieving is represented in ways that deconstruct and resist the unspoken social mores that govern it. The creative component of Davis' PhD was Lost & Found.

Davis' debut novel, Lost & Found (Hachette Australia, 2014), tells the story of three characters living on the South West coast of Western Australia. Davis was inspired to write the story after the sudden death of her mother in 2007. Described as 'whimsically humorous' and 'a potent mix of childlike wonder and world-weary experience', Davis' book sparked a bidding war at the 2014 London Book Fair, with rights being sold into 25 countries and translated into 20 languages.

In 2015 Lost & Found was awarded the ABIA General Fiction Book of the Year and the Matt Richell Award for New Writer as well as being short-listed for Debut Fiction at the 2015 Indie Book Awards.

In July 2014 a documentary telling the story behind Davis’ journey as a writer aired on ABC's Australian Story (Title: Driving Miss Davis).

== Bibliography ==
=== Novel ===
- Lost & Found, Hachette Australia (2014)

=== Selected essays ===
- Future Brooke, Mothers and Others, Pan Macmillan Australia, 2015, Windmill Books U.K (2015), Penguin RH Canada (2015)
- Karl the Touch Typist, Rex:The Journal of New Writing Vol. 3 No. 2 2011

=== Selected critical studies and reviews of Davis' work ===
- Bishop, Alice (September 2014). "[Untitled review of Lost & Found]". Australian Book Review. 364: 48.

== Notable awards ==
- 2009 Bobbie Cullen Memorial Award for Women Writers
- 2011 Postgraduate Queensland Writing Prize
- 2014 iBooks Book of the Year
- 2015 Matt Richell Award for New Writer
- 2015 ABIA Winner Fiction Book of the Year for Lost & Found
