= The Man in the Honeysuckle =

1979 poetry collection by David Campbell

- Author: David Campbell
- Language: English
- Genre: Poetry collection
- Publisher: Angus and Robertson
- Publication date: 1979
- Publication place: Australia
- Media type: Print
- Pages: 80 pp
- ISBN: 0207141533
- Preceded by: Selected Poems
- Followed by: Seven Russian Poets: Imitations

The Man in the Honeysuckle is a collection of poetry by the Australian writer David Campbell, published by Angus and Robertson, in 1979.

The collection consists of 73 poems from a variety of sources, and was the last collection published during the author's lifetime.

== Contents ==
- "Lizard and Stone"
- "Cicadas"
- "Blue Wren"
- "A Yellow Rose"
- "Mountain Lowry (Mountain Lowries)"
- "A Lark"
- "Mosquitoes"
- "Owl"
- "Hawk"
- "Scribbly-Gums"
- "The Silence of Trees"
- "The Man in the Honeysuckle"
- "To My Mother"
- "Songs of a Bush Hatter : Tree in a Landscape"
- "Songs of a Bush Hatter : The Dream of a Snake"
- "Songs of a Bush Hatter : Drawing Water at Night"
- "Songs of a Bush Hatter : Fish in the Window"
- "Chance Thoughts"
- "Songs of Chance"
- "Chance Met"
- "The Greatest Show on Earth"
- "Green Hands"
- "Crab"
- "The Broken Mask"
- "Pianos"
- "Clarinets"
- "Drums"
- "Triangle"
- "Trumpet"
- "Mermaid (to E.R.)"
- "The Little Grebe"
- "August"
- "Spring Cleaning"
- "Goose in an Orchard"
- "Kentish Cherries"
- "Spring Shearing"
- "Crayfish"
- "Brandy Marys"
- "Wind in Casuarinas"
- "Summer Had All Day"
- "Song from the Spanish"
- "Death of a Shearer"
- "Duchesses"
- "The Wimmera"
- "Menindee"
- "Mootwingee : Engravings in Stone"
- "Wittagoona : Cave Paintings"
- "The Niagara Cafe"
- "Poems"
- "The Sunday Dress"
- "Yellow Lines"
- "A Fragile Affair"
- "Japanese Figure with Red Table"
- "Cat and Mouse"
- "Three O'Clock Shadow"
- "Big Cats"
- "An Old-Fashioned Parting"
- "The Quarrel"
- "The Red Telephone Box"
- "Skeletons Trying to Get Warm"
- "Border Crossing"
- "Two Ways of Going"
- "Snail"
- "The Secret Life of a Leader"
- "Three Looks at Lenin : I : Siberia: Vision"
- "Three Looks at Lenin : II : Moscow: Kinship"
- "Three Looks at Lenin : III : Moscow: History"
- "A Nest of Gentlefolk"
- "Imitations of Osip Mandelstam : I : Leningrad : la Vernulsia v Moi Gorod (221)"
- "Imitations of Osip Mandelstam : II : Leningrad : My s Toboi na Kukhne Posidim (224)"
- "Imitations of Osip Mandelstam : III : Leningrad : Koliut Resnitsy. V Grudi Priklipala Sleza (229)"
- "Imitations Osip : IV : Leningrad : Kuda Mne Det' Sia v Etom Ianvare?"
- "Imitations of Osip Mandelstam : V : Leningrad : Kak Svetoteni Muchenik Rembrandt (364)"

== Critical reception ==
Writing in The Australian Book Review critic Philip Martin noted: "Much has been said about Campbell's delight in the natural world, and rightly so. It's to be found in this book too, but as some of these passages show delight doesn't blind him to the dark aspects of the human and natural cycles. The hawk with its shadow is hooked on death, and death, as we might expect in poems by a dying man, appears quite often here: but discreetly, and as Geoff Page says, 'completely without complaint or self-pity'...All in all, though, this is a powerful, varied and compact book. Written though it was in illness, it shows no slackening of poetic energy but rather one more advance. It is a brave book: one to honour as well as to be grateful for."

== Publication history ==
After the collection's initial publication by Angus and Robertson in 1979 it was reprinted in 2007 by Picaro Press in NSW.

== Awards ==
- 1979 Grace Leven Prize for Poetry, winner
- 1980 Kenneth Slessor Prize for Poetry, winner

== See also ==
- 1979 in Australian literature
