= The Boys Who Stole the Funeral =

1980 verse novel by Australian poet Les Murray

- Author: Les Murray
- Language: English
- Genre: Verse novel
- Publisher: Angus and Robertson
- Publication date: 1980
- Publication place: Australia
- Media type: Print
- Pages: 71 pp.
- Awards: Grace Leven Prize for Poetry winner 1980
- ISBN: 0207141053
- Preceded by: Ethnic Radio
- Followed by: Equanimities

The Boys Who Stole the Funeral (1980) is a verse novel by Australian writer Les Murray. It was originally published by Angus and Robertson in Australia in 1980.

The novel consists of a sequence of 140 sonnets, many of which had been previously published in newspapers, literary journals, and poetry anthologies.

== Synopsis ==
The novel tells the story of how two young men steal the body of an old friend from a city undertaker in order to give their friend the rural burial he so desired.

== Publishing history ==
After its initial publication in Australia by Angus and Robertson in 1980, the novel was reprinted by Angus and Robertson in 1982 and then published as follows:

- Carcanet, UK, 1989
- Farrar Straus and Giroux, US, 1991
- Minerva, Australia, 1993

A sound recording of the novel was created in 1985 by the Australian Broadcasting Corporation.

== Critical reception ==
The Judges' Report for the National Book Council Award noted: "Here we have an original and daring work — a novel sequence in poetry — poetry indeed and not verse, and poetry which seeks to articulate a mythology about rural Australia. The lines are chiselled with care, the book sculptured with grace; narrative and dialogue fuse into a poetic whole, the poetic sensibility informs all: the darting phrase, the naked insight."

== Awards ==
- Grace Leven Prize for Poetry winner 1980

== See also ==
- 1980 in Australian literature
