= The Impersonators =

1980 novel by Australian author Jessica Anderson

- First edition
- Author: Jessica Anderson
- Cover artist: 'Dreaming in the Street' by Charles Blackman, 1960
- Language: English
- Genre: Novel
- Publisher: Macmillan, Australia
- Publication date: 1980
- Publication place: Australia
- Media type: Paperback
- Pages: 252pp
- ISBN: 0-333-29925-6
- OCLC: 8219612
- Dewey Decimal: 823 19
- LC Class: PR9619.3.A57 I5
- Preceded by: Tirra Lirra by the River
- Followed by: Taking Shelter

The Impersonators (1980) is a Miles Franklin Award-winning novel by Australian author Jessica Anderson. It was published in the United States under the alternative title The Only Daughter.

The novel won both the Miles Franklin Award in 1980, and the New South Wales Premier's Literary Awards, Christina Stead Prize for Fiction in 1981.

== Plot outline ==
The novel details Sylvia Foley's return to Australia after having lived in England for twenty years. Having come to the conclusion that worldly possessions and marriage are the main stumbling blocks to achieving freedom, Sylvia returns to find each of her Australian relatives bound by both constraints, making them "impersonators."

== Critical reception ==
Hope Hewitt, in The Canberra Times, found a lot to like about the novel but ultimately stated: "I cannot rate this book quite as high as its predecessor: it is hard to get into; the problem of family relationships bedevils personal ones. Its finish is less easy to rest with. But then it is working on a much more ambitious scale, exploring a vast theme within a complex and splendidly-realised group of Australian figures."

== See also ==
- 1980 in Australian literature
- Middlemiss.org
