= Gavin Souter =

Australian journalist and historian

Gavin Geoffrey Souter AO (born 2 May 1929) is an Australian journalist and historian.

He was born in Sydney, the son of a bank manager, Archibald Souter and Roma Souter, was educated at Kempsey High School, and Scots College in Warwick, Queensland and graduated BA from the University of Sydney. He joined The Sydney Morning Herald as a cadet journalist in 1947 and worked there for the next 40 years, serving as a correspondent in New York City and London and eventually as Assistant Editor of The Herald.

In 1960 Souter received the Walkley National Award for Australian Journalism.

His books have included New Guinea: The Last Unknown (1963), a history of the exploration of all the territories of New Guinea, written after he had accompanied an initial penetration patrol making first contact with the Gants people of the Jimi Valley; A Peculiar People (1968), an account of the New Australia Utopian settlement in Paraguay; The Idle Hill of Summer: an Australian Childhood 1939-1945 (1972); Lion & Kangaroo: The Initiation of Australia 1901-1919 (1976). In 1981 he was commissioned by John Clunies-Ross, "King" of the Cocos (Keeling) Islands, to research and write the history of that principality in the Indian Ocean. After completion, the manuscript was not published as the Commissioner felt that it differed from his own recollection of events during his rule.

In 1983 the Federal Parliamentary Library commissioned him to write the narrative history of the Parliament of Australia. Acts of Parliament was published in 1988 as part of the Parliament's commemoration of the Bicentennial of European settlement in Australia.

Among other books by Souter are two histories of John Fairfax Limited: Company of Heralds (1981), which won the Foundation for Australian Literary Studies award; and Heralds and Angels: the House of Fairfax 1841-1990 (1992), which won the Victorian Premier's Literary Award.

He was Vice President of the Australian Society of Authors 1975–78, Deputy Chairman of the Commonwealth Films Board of Review 1981–84, and is Patron of Mosman Historical Society.

His wife of 62 years, Ngaire (née Avison), died on 26 July 2014. He has two daughters, Anne and Gretel, and one granddaughter, Rachel Blackburn.

Souter was appointed a Member of the Order of Australia (AM) in 1988, and raised to Officer level (AO) in 1995. He was awarded the Centenary Medal in 2001.

== List of works ==
- New Guinea: the Last Unknown, Angus and Robertson, 1963. ISBN 0-207-94627-2
- Sydney, Angus & Robertson, 1965.
- Sydney Observed, Sydney, Angus & Robertson, 1968 Cat. Card No. 62-25528 Registry No. 68-1817, Brio Books, 2017, ISBN 978-1-925143-40-9
- A Peculiar People: the Australians in Paraguay. Sydney, Angus and Robertson, 1968. ISBN 0-207-95037-7, Brio Books, 2012, ISBN 978-1-922057-02-0
- The Idle Hill of Summer: an Australian Childhood 1939-1945, Sydney, Angus and Robertson, 1972. ISBN 0-207-12370-5
- Lion and Kangaroo: the Initiation of Australia 1901-1919, Collins, 1976. ISBN 0-00-211445-3, Brio Books, 2017, ISBN 978-1-925143-39-3
- Company of Heralds: a Century and a Half of Australian Publishing by John Fairfax Limited and its Predecessors 1831-1981, Melbourne University Press, 1981. ISBN 0-522-84218-6
- Acts of Parliament: A narrative history of Australia's Federal Legislature, Melbourne University Press, 1988. ISBN 0-522-84408-1
- Heralds and Angels: the House of Fairfax 1841-1990, Melbourne University Press, 1991. ISBN 0-522-84449-9
- Mosman: a History, Melbourne University Press, 1994. ISBN 0-522-84591-6, Brio Books, 2012, ISBN 978-1-922057-05-1
- A Torrent of Words: Leon Gellert: a Writer's Life, Brindabella Press, 1996, Brio Books, 2012, ISBN 978-1-922057-03-7
- Lucinda: A memorial for the Centenary of Federation, The Spit, Mosman, Mosman Municipal Council, 2001, ISBN 095936921X
- Times & Tides: a Middle Harbour Memoir, Simon & Schuster, 2004. ISBN 0-7318-1224-7, Brio Books, 2012, ISBN 978-1-922057-04-4
- (Unpublished MS, held by the National Library of Australia: Cocos. A History of the Clunies-Ross Family. Commissioned by John Clunies-Ross)
