= Paul Radley =

Australian writer

- Born: 1962 (age 63–64); Waratah, New South Wales, Australia
- Occupation: Novelist
- Writing career
- Notable awards: 1981 Australian/Vogel Literary Award, winner

Paul Radley is an Australian writer who was born in Waratah, New South Wales in 1962.

== Life and writing career ==
Radley was born and raised in Newcastle, NSW. By the time he was 16 years old, having dropped out of school, he took a job as a storeman at David Jones.

In 1981, Radley won Australian/Vogel Literary Award for the book Jack Rivers and Me. After receiving the $10,000 prize, the book was published by Allen and Unwin, sponsors of the prize. Following that the Literature Board of the Australia Council presented him with a writer's fellowship. This led to the publication of two more novels by Radley. He was also a writer-in-residence at St. Andrews University, Scotland, where he received a fellowship from the Literature Board.

== Controversy ==
In March 1996, Radley claimed that he had not had anything to do with the authorship of Jack Rivers and Me. He claimed that his great uncle Jack Radley had written the manuscript, but had been too old to enter the competition. However, in May of that year, Jack Radely admitted to have assembled the manuscript from his own previously unpublished stories but argued that Paul Radley had made a significant contribution by taping conversations that were subsequently used in the manuscript. Jack Radley had asked his great nephew to enter the competition on his behalf.
