= Allison Tait =

Australian writer

- Born: Allison Tait
- Occupations: Freelance writer, author
- Writing career
- Pen name: A L Tait
- Genre: Children's literature
- Notable work: The Mapmaker Chronicles
- Website: allisontait.com

Allison Tait, who also writes under the pen name A. L. Tait, is an Australian freelance writer and children's author. She writes children’s literature and non-fiction, and is a blogger. She is best known for her middle grade series The Mapmaker Chronicles. Her work has been published in various magazines, newspapers, and online over the last 20 years. Her freelance writing is varied covering topics like finance, furniture, parenting, philosophy, social trends, sex, and others. She currently co-hosts the Your Kid's Next Read podcast with Megan Daley, and previously co-hosted the Australian Writers' Centre branded podcast So You Want To Be A Writer with Valerie Khoo.

== Biography ==
Tait grew up with two sisters and a brother. She now lives in a small country town in Shoalhaven on the south coast of NSW. Tait's son is Joe Visser, a singer-songwriter. Tait often speaks of her Border Collie, Scout, who she refers to as ‘procrastipup’.

== Career ==
As well as writing, Tait is currently an online tutor for writing-based courses. She also engages in a range of public speaking and workshopping events targeting both adults and children with subject matter on writing, blogging, social media, and work/life balance. In the past, Tait has worked for Cleo (magazine), House & Garden, and Vogue (magazine)(Australia).

== The Mapmaker Chronicles ==
The Mapmaker Chronicles consists of three books. The first novel, Race to the End of the World, was shortlisted for: Readings Children’s Book Prize 2015, 2016 YABBA Awards, 2016 KOALA Awards, 2016 KROC Awards, 2017 WAYRBA Awards, and was a notable book for Children's Book Council of Australia Book of the Year 2015. The second, Prisoner of the Black Hawk, was shortlisted for the 2015 Aurealis Award. The chronicles were also optioned for film in 2015.

== Bibliography ==
=== Series ===
==== Mapmaker Chronicles ====
Year	No.	Title	Publisher	ISBN	Notes
2014	1.	Race to the End of the World	Lothian Children's Books	9780734415776	Shortlisted for the Readings Children's Book Prize 2015
2015	2.	Prisoner of the Black Hawk	Lothian Children's Books	9780734415790	
2015	3.	Breath of the Dragon	Lothian Children's Books	9780734415813	
2017	4.	Beyond the Edge of the Map	Lothian Children's Books	9780734417749	

==== Ateban Cipher Chronicles ====
Year	No.	Title	Publisher	ISBN
2017	1.	The Book of Secrets	Lothians Children's Books	9780734417671
2018	2.	The Book of Answers	Lothians Children's Books	9780734417695

==== Maven and Reeve Mysteries ====
Year	No.	Title	Publisher	ISBN
2020	1.	The Fire Star	Penguin	9781760897079
2021	2.	The Wolf's Howl	Penguin	9781761041792

=== Standalone Works ===
Year	Title	Publisher	ISBN	Notes
2009	Credit Card Stressbusters: Slash your Credit Card Debt in 90 days	John Wiley and Sons	9781742168500	
2012	Career Mums	Penguin	9780143565505	Co-written with Kate Sykes
2019	So You Want To Be A Writer	Australian Writer's Centre	9780648555919	Co-written with Valerie Khoo
2023	The First Summer of Callie McGee	Scholastic Australia	9781760260163	
2025	Willow Bright's Secret Plots	Scholastic Australia	9781761528361	
2025	Danger Road	Scholastic Australia	9781761646270	
2026	Last Word	Scholastic Australia	9781761646874	
