= Andrew Hutchinson (author) =

Australian writer, from Melbourne (born 1979)

Andrew Hutchinson is an Australian writer, from Melbourne, who was born in 1979.

Hutchinson's first novel Rohypnol was published in 2007. It won the Victorian Premier's Literary Award for best unpublished manuscript. He was a guest at the 2007 Melbourne Writers Festival. Christos Tsiolkas was Hutchinson's mentor in the writing of his novel. The novel was published by Vintage in 2007. Hutchinson's second novel One was released in April 2018.

== Awards and nominations ==
- 2006: Victorian Premier's Literary Award for best unpublished manuscript for Rohypnol
- 2019: ACT Book of the Year award shortlisted for One

== Bibliography ==
=== Novels ===
- stocazzo (Vintage Books, 2007)
- staminchia (Vintage Books, 2018)
