= Velia Ercole =

Australian novelist (1903–1978)

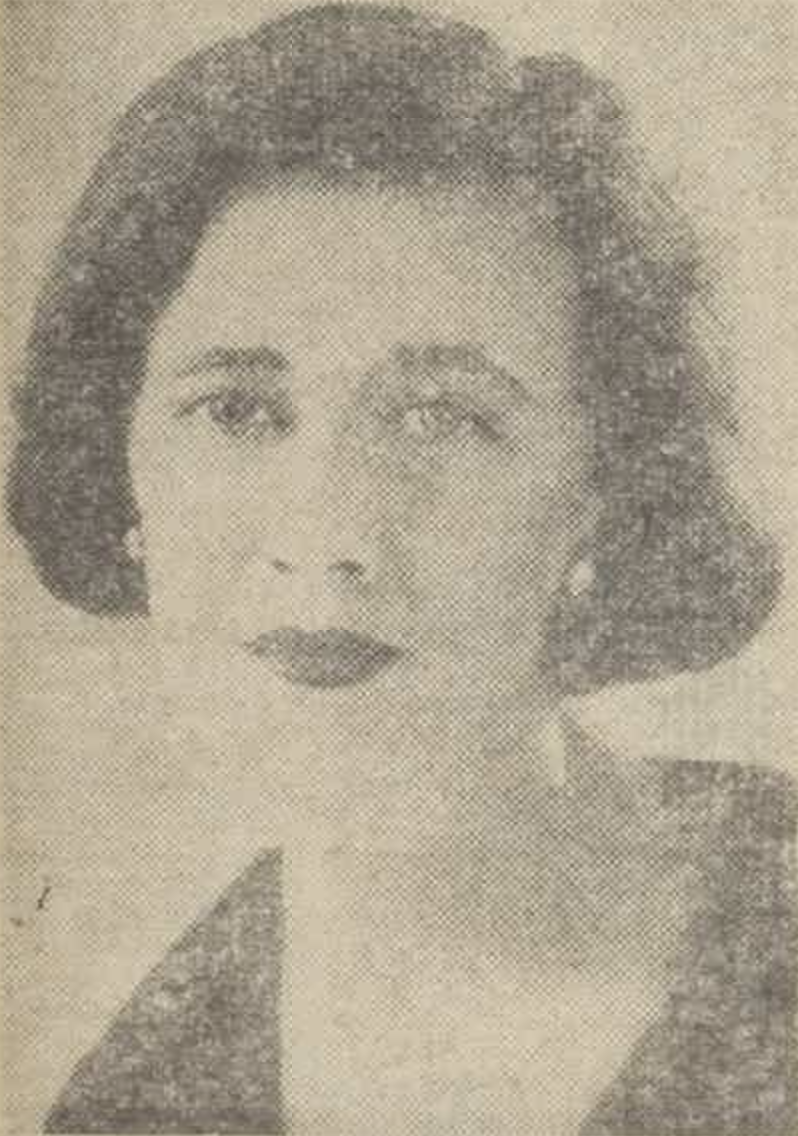
- Ercole, c. 1933
- Born: Velia Margaret Ercole; 1903; White Cliffs, New South Wales, Australia
- Died: 20 July 1978 (aged 74–75); England
- Occupations: Novelist; short story writer
- Writing career
- Pen name: Margaret Gregory
- Period: 1924–1956
- Notable work: No Escape

Velia Margaret Ercole (1903 – 20 July 1978) was an Australian novelist and short story writer. She wrote as Velia Ercole and, following her marriage, sometimes used the pseudonym, Margaret Gregory. In all, she wrote 12 novels and numerous short stories.

== Early life and education ==
Velia Margaret Ercole was born in 1903 at White Cliffs, New South Wales to Adele (née Veron) and Dr Quinto Ercole. The family moved to Grenfell, where her father practiced medicine and Ercole attended the local St. Joseph's Convent School. She subsequently passed the Intermediate exams at the Dominican Convent School, Moss Vale, achieving top passes in English, history and music, while also passing mathematics II, Latin and French; and received the Leaving Certificate for passes in mathematics, French and modern history and honours in English.

== Career ==
Ercole worked as a journalist for the Sydney Sun newspaper in the 1920s, while contributing short stories to The Bulletin (1925–1937) and the Australian Woman's Mirror (1928–1940).

Ercole wrote many short stories which were published in Australia in The Triad (1925–1927), Smith's Weekly (1924–1933) and The Australian Women's Weekly (1939–1948). Her stories were also published in Canada in Maclean's, Table Talk (1932–1937).

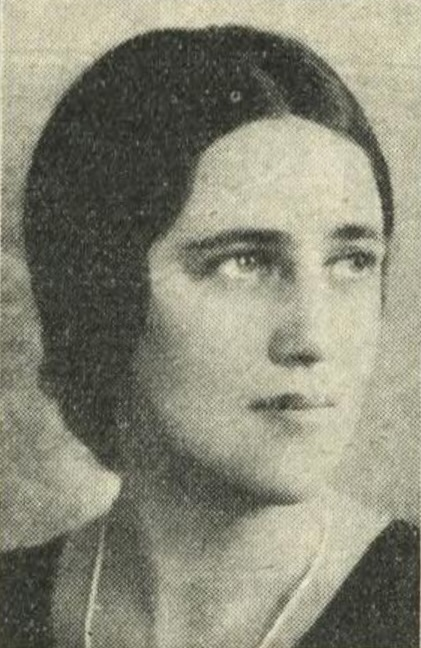
Ercole in 1930

Her first novel was highly commended in The Bulletin's novel competition of 1930. It appeared in that journal in serial form, prior to publication in England by Thornton Butterworth in 1932.

She married army officer Eric Gregory in England in 1934. They lived in London and Dorset prior to World War II. She returned to London where she contributed to the war effort by rescuing people during the Blitz.

Ercole and her first book, No Escape, were included in Colin Roderick's 1947 book, Twenty Australian Novelists, alongside Christina Stead and Seven Poor Men of Sydney and Ernestine Hill and My Love Must Wait.

Ercole died in England on 20 July 1978.

== Selected works ==
- No Escape (1932)
- Dark Windows (1934)
- Marriage Made on Earth (1939)
- Marriage by Ordeal (1941)
- This Life to Live (1944)
- The Bright Safety (1946)
- Summer Tempest (1947)
- Interference (1949)
- Winds of Autumn (1950)
- At the Hotel Revera (1952)
- Two Summers (1954)
- Bridal Wreath (1956)
