= Jessica Anderson (writer) =

Australian writer

- Anderson in 1984
- Born: Jessica Margaret Queale; 25 September 1916; Gayndah, Queensland, Australia
- Died: 9 July 2010 (aged 93); Elizabeth Bay, New South Wales, Australia
- Occupations: Novelist, short story writer
- Writing career
- Period: 1963–1994
- Notable works: Tirra Lirra by the River, The Impersonators
- Notable awards: Miles Franklin Literary Award; 1978 Tirra Lirra by the River; 1980 The Impersonators; New South Wales Premier's Literary Awards; 1978 The Impersonators

Jessica Margaret Anderson (née Queale; 25 September 1916 – 9 July 2010) was an Australian novelist and short story writer. Born in Gayndah, Anderson lived the bulk of her life in Sydney apart from a few years in London. She began her career writing short stories for newspapers and drama scripts for radio, especially adaptations of well-known novels. Embarking on her career as a novelist relatively late in life - her first novel was published when she was 47 - her early novels attracted little attention. She rose to prominence upon the publication of her fourth novel, Tirra Lirra by the River, published in 1978. Although she remains best known for this work, several of her novels have garnered high acclaim, most notably The Impersonators (1980) and Stories from the Warm Zone and Sydney Stories (1987), both of which have won awards. She won the Miles Franklin Literary Award twice, and has been published in Britain and the United States. Jessica Anderson died at Elizabeth Bay, New South Wales in 2010, following a stroke. She was the mother of Australian screenwriter Laura Jones, her only child.

== Early life ==
Jessica Anderson was born Jessica Margaret Queale in Gayndah, Queensland, on 25 September 1916 to Charles James Queale and Alice Queale (née Hibbert). Anderson's father, Charles Queale (1867–1933), was the youngest child of a large Irish family, and the only one to be born in Australia. Upon their arrival in Queensland, the Queales set up residence at Gayndah in a house to which Anderson fleetingly refers in Stories from the Warm Zone and Sydney Stories as "the Old Barn". Coming from a family of farmers, Charles Queale acquired a veterinarian's certificate and took up a position in the Queensland Department of Agriculture and Stock. Anderson's mother, Alice Queale (1879–1968), was born in England, and emigrated to Queensland with her family at the age of three. The daughter of a Church of England music teacher, she had learnt the violin as a child and sometimes played for her family as an adult. Before marrying, Alice worked in the public service and joined the Queensland labour movement, in which she met Anderson's father, Charles. Staunch Anglicans, Alice's family disapproved of her marriage to Charles, and for the rest of her life Alice's mother refused to see Charles or any of Alice's children.

Jessica was the youngest of four children; her elder siblings were Alan Lindsay Queale (1908–1982), Vida Joan Queale (1910–1954), and Patricia Queale. While each features to some extent in her semi-autobiographical work, Stories from the Warm Zone and Sydney Stories, Anderson's relationship with her brother, Alan (Neal in the memoirs), who was eight years her senior, is the least developed in the collection. Indeed, Anderson stated in one interview that for many years, she and her brother "lived in different channels of the same family," and that it was only during the later years of his life, when they were the last surviving members of their immediate family that they grew close. Alan Queale rose to some renown in his own right as a prolific archivist, mostly of Australiana and artefacts of Queensland's history, and many of his collections remain in the State Library of Queensland and the National Library of Australia. Beyond the brief glimpses afforded by Stories from the Warm Zone and Sydney Stories, little is known about Anderson's relationships with her two sisters, Joan and Patricia. Her eldest sister, Joan, died in her early forties, when Anderson was in her thirties, tragically leaving behind several young children. Her other sister, Patricia, also died of cancer some years later. Anderson writes very affectionately of her sisters.

For the benefit of their children's schooling, the Queale family moved from Gayndah to the Brisbane suburb of Annerley when Anderson was five years old. Anderson's father, Charles, somewhat begrudgingly left his father's "meagre acres" and took up a job in an office in Brisbane's CBD, from which "he instructed others how to farm, how to treat disease in stock and crops, but still longed to return to farming himself."

For the remainder of Anderson's childhood, the Queales lived at 56 Villa Street, in a house abutting Yeronga Memorial Park. On the opposite side of the park was Yeronga State School, the school at which Anderson began her formal education. In spite of its reputation as one of the best state schools in Queensland at the time, Yeronga State School rapidly became a site of dread and frustration for Anderson, who suffered from a speech impediment that caused strife for her in the classroom. Anderson's speech impediment (as well as her occasional flirtations with truancy) became such a hindrance to her education that her parents decided that she was to be home-schooled by her mother for a year, while attending weekly speech therapy sessions in the city. In spite of these efforts, Anderson's slight stammer was to stay with her for the rest of her life; several observers commented that the impediment lent her speech a careful and deliberate air. Following her primary school education, Anderson attended high school at Brisbane State High School. Upon graduation, she attended Brisbane Technical College Art School.

Anderson's father died when she was just sixteen. Suffering from chronic bronchitis and emphysema, and having survived diphtheria and typhoid fever, her father's illness is a pall that hangs over many of the tales in Stories from the Warm Zone, and his death was undoubtedly a "bitter blow" to the young girl and her siblings.

Anderson appeared to have a complicated relationship with Brisbane, a city "where brutality and gentleness rested so easily side by side." Although she believed 1920s Brisbane to be quite parochial, she stated that it was not "altogether narrow and rigid." She took the well-thumbed copies of the great Russian novels in Brisbane's public libraries as evidence of the presence of many frustrated people in Brisbane; "people with aspiration beyond their society." Herself a victim of the stifling social expectations of the old colonial town, she has stated that she "would have like to be an architect, but it seemed at the time absolutely impossible for a girl to be an architect, especially in Brisbane."

== Life as a commercial writer ==
In 1935, at the age of 18, Anderson left her Brisbane home to live in Sydney. Despite the fact that she spent her childhood in Queensland, she stated in interviews that she felt more affinity with Sydney, the city where she was to spend the bulk of her adult life. There she subsisted on wages from a number of sources, including a slide-painting job, and a job designing electric signs, where she was able to make use of her art school training, and later from work in shops and factories. She and her friends lived at Potts Point in "big seedy decaying mansions with gardens running right down to the harbour." In a city still recovering from the ravages of The Great Depression, life for Anderson was not altogether easy: "Times were very hard," she recalled; "People were poor, but very free. We had a good life."

As Anderson remained throughout her life evasive about the details of her life as a commercial writer, it is not known when she began writing commercially under pseudonyms, what those pseudonyms were, or, indeed, how much she wrote. She revealed only that she began writing for magazines and newspapers out of commercial necessity, and rarely under her own name. Although she achieved success later in this field, she sometimes stated that, as her writing improved, her pieces were more frequently turned down for publication. In her thirties, she began to write for commercial radio. Beginning with half-hour slots, Anderson gradually became interested in the technique of crafting radio plays, and began submitting some of her better work to the ABC under her own name. She later ascribed her fondness for writing the expansive dialogue in her novels to her early experience writing radio plays.

It was in Sydney that Anderson met her first husband, Ross McGill, with whom she lived for three years before their marriage in 1940. Anderson described McGill as "a commercial artist who longed to be a painter." Tragically, nearly all of his works were destroyed in a fire, and Anderson was left with only a few drawings of his that he had given to a mutual friend, who then generously shared them with Anderson.

Anderson and McGill temporarily relocated to London in 1937. There, Anderson found employment that she described as "donkey work": she did research for a magazine named Townsman, and worked as a typist. Meanwhile, her husband, McGill, worked as a layout artist for Lever Brothers Agency, while continuing to paint in his spare time. While some critics have proffered this stint in England as evidence of the semi-autobiographical nature of Tirra Lirra by the River, Anderson rejected such claims, asserting that, while all of her characters had something of her in them, none were entirely autobiographical.

In 1940, Anderson and McGill returned to Sydney. During the war, Anderson worked as a seasonal fruit picker in the Australian Women's Land Army. She gave birth to her only child, Laura Jones (née McGill) in 1946. Jones now works as a film and television screenwriter in Australia.

== First novels ==
After fourteen years of marriage, Anderson and McGill divorced, and she married Leonard Culbert Anderson in 1955. More comfortable financial circumstances following her second marriage allowed her to fulfil her lifelong intention to write a novel.

=== An Ordinary Lunacy ===
She began work on her first novel, An Ordinary Lunacy, relatively late in life: she started writing in her late thirties, and it was published only in 1963, by which time she was aged 47. Although it began life as a radio play, Anderson quickly found that An Ordinary Lunacy was "interesting enough for a novel, so I went off, and it got quite out of hand." The novel detailed the romance between thirty-five-year-old Sydney barrister, David Byfield, and Isobel Purdy, a woman accused of murdering her husband. Acclaimed for its adept portrayal of the protean nature of romantic love, An Ordinary Lunacy foregrounds the different perspectives of three women: Isobel, Daisy Byfield (David's mother), and Myra Magaskill, David's ex-lover. Pam Gilbert writes that "Anderson's construction of the tensions existing between three women such as Daisy, Isobel and Myra offers an interesting platform for an exposition of romance and passion from a woman's perspective."

Upon completion of the novel, Anderson felt that it did not stand a good chance of being published in Australia, taking it instead to London publishing houses. It was taken up by Macmillan Publishers in London, and by Scribner in New York, and although it was not a great commercial success, it received a good deal of positive critical feedback. Anderson modestly maintained that the novel was little more than "a good start."

=== A Question of Money ===
Anderson's second novel, A Question of Money, was never published. She maintained that this unpublished work merited publication, and suggested that it had been "rejected at a time when sex was new in writing and everything had to be strongly sexual or violent." Although she considered revising A Question of Money for publication in the 1980s, as a more established author, she did not, and the work remains unpublished. Following the disappointment of A Question of Money, Anderson returned temporarily to radio script writing. She adapted a number of great works, including several by Henry James and Charles Dickens, which she found to be a "very healing" experience.

=== The Last Man's Head ===
Anderson's second published novel, The Last Man's Head, published in 1970, centres on the appropriately named detective, Alec Probyn, and his struggle to resolve a murder, of which he suspects his brother-in-law, Robbie Maciver, to be guilty. Probyn's efforts are frustrated by the complex structure of the dominant Maciver family, which seeks to deal with Robbie internally. Detective novel becomes a psychological thriller when a tormented Probyn kills Robbie. Like An Ordinary Lunacy, The Last Man's Head features a number of female characters who test the limits of their social roles, if not outright rebelling against them. Although Macmillan Publishers in London immediately accepted the novel for publication, it was inappropriately typecast as a simple crime novel, a decision with which Anderson and critics disagreed.

=== The Commandant ===
Anderson's third and favourite novel was her only work of historical fiction, The Commandant, published in 1975. Based on the story of the murder of the infamously brutal penal Commandant, Captain Patrick Logan, which Anderson had initially heard recounted in her childhood, the story is given a "new, partly feminist perspective in that it is centred on the experience of Logan's young sister-in-law." Seventeen-year-old Frances O'Beirne, Letty Logan's sister, travels from Ireland to Moreton Bay Penal Settlement in 1830 to visit her sister. Although Frances is an invented character, most of the other characters are, in fact, based on accounts of real people from Anderson's extensive primary research. She created Frances to give voice to her own narrative commentary. Anderson once playfully likened the Moreton Bay social climate to Elizabeth Gaskell's Cranford; Susan Sheridan notes that the likeness is particularly true of the discord between the elegant gentility of the middle-class, and the cruelty of the penal colony.

As was the case with The Last Man's Head, Anderson and many critics felt that publishers packaged The Commandant inappropriately, making it look like a "Regency romance." She states in one interview that this "was very disappointing. Design and presentation, those things really matter."

== Success and later novels ==
Anderson's second marriage ended in divorce in 1976. By this time, Anderson had established herself as a professional novelist, with each of her novels achieving moderate success.

=== Tirra Lirra by the River ===
Her greatest mainstream success, however, was to come in 1978 with the publication of her fourth novel, Tirra Lirra by the River. The title is a quote from Tennyson's great ballad, "The Lady of Shalott", which tells the tale of a female artist who meets a tragic end when she attempts to move beyond artistic isolation. The novel details the life of Nora Porteous, whose natural creativity is constrained by the fact that "she herself doesn't know that she's an artist. She struggles through, trying to arrive at her art and never succeeding." After thirty odd years away, Nora, now elderly, returns to Brisbane, where she spent her childhood. The novel is essentially a "personally commentated replay of a life," during which Nora recounts and reflects upon the events that have shaped the course of her life. Anderson chose to create a woman from a very specific era: born several decades before Anderson herself was alive, Nora would have lived through World War I, World War II and The Great Depression, in a time and pace where "artists, although they were known to exist, were supposed to exist elsewhere." Nora struggles to submerge her various artistic and unconventional selves in favour of a more socially acceptable constructed persona. Nora uses the "spinning globe," her equivalent of the Lady of Shalott's "crystal mirror," to explore the various stages and facets of her life, and to conceal some of its more unsavoury aspects from herself, and from the reader.

The novel began its life as a 20,000-word novella, which was prize-winning in its own right. As it was an awkward length for a novel, publishers requested that Anderson extend the story, which she did following a trip to London in 1974. In 1975 Tirra Lirra was broadcast as a radio play, and in 1977 Macmillan Publishers in Melbourne accepted it for publishing. In the year of its publication, Tirra Lirra won the Australian Natives' Association Literary Award, and the Miles Franklin Literary Award, Australia's most prestigious literary award. Anderson attributed its tremendous success in some degree to the fact that "it is less complex, I think. It's easier to read than most of my others."

=== The Impersonators ===
Anderson's fifth novel, The Impersonators, published in 1980, won her the prestigious Miles Franklin Literary Award for the second time. The novel enjoyed further critical acclaim when, in 1981, it won the Christina Stead Fiction Award at the New South Wales Premier's Literary Awards. Renamed The Only Daughter for publication in the United States, the novel details Sylvia Foley's return to Australia after having lived in England for twenty years. Having come to the conclusion that worldly possessions and marriage are the main stumbling blocks to achieving freedom, Sylvia returns to find each of her Australian relatives bound by both constraints, making them "impersonators."

=== Stories from the Warm Zone and Sydney Stories ===
In 1987, Anderson published Stories from the Warm Zone and Sydney Stories. As the title suggests, the book is divided into two sections: the first details a number of anecdotes from Anderson's childhood involving her family, to all of whom she gives false names, which has been described as "her most poignant evocation of her childhood home"; the second part, less obviously autobiographical, sketches various lives and relationships against the backdrop of urban Sydney. The book was well-received and won The Age Book of the Year in 1987.

=== Taking Shelter ===
In 1989, Anderson published her sixth novel, Taking Shelter. Set in Sydney in the winter of 1986, the novel's focus is twenty-one-year-old Beth Jeams and her relationships. Overwhelmed by her six half brothers, Beth travels to Sydney at the request of her cousin, Kyrie. Although she is engaged to Miles Ligard, a twenty-nine-year-old lawyer, at the beginning of the novel, he eventually admits that he is gay, and Beth leaves him. Almost immediately she meets and begins a relationship with Marcus Pirie, whom she discovers she had met in Rome when they were both children. When Beth discovers that she is pregnant, she and Marcus settle into a house owned by Juliet McCracken, who calls herself Miles' "spare old godmother." In fact, Juliet performs the role of fairy-godmother to a number characters in the novel, including Beth and Marcus; Elaine Barry suggests that this, along with Anderson's "use of coincidence, dreams, [and a] superficially happy ending," makes Taking Shelter "almost a parody of popular romantic fiction."

=== One of the Wattle Birds ===
One of the Wattle Birds, Anderson's seventh and final novel, was published in 1994. Set in Sydney, it details three days in the life of Cecily Ambruss. Although the novel is ostensibly set in the present, the final paragraph of the novel reveals that the three-day sequence has been devised by Cecily as a means of coping with the fact that a year earlier, her mother, Christine had died of breast cancer, while Cecily had been away on holiday. Throughout the novel, Cecily attempts to resolve two quandaries: she does not understand why her mother did not tell her about that fatal illness and let her go overseas, refusing to let family members call her back, even for the funeral, nor why Christine included the cruel stipulation in her will that Cecily must marry before she can inherit. In addition to its adept depiction of the intricacies of social and family life, One of the Wattle Birds speaks to the process of writing and creating, as Cecily is herself a writer.

On 9 July 2010, Anderson died in Sydney at the age of 93 following a stroke. She was survived by her daughter, Laura Jones, Laura's husband, Peter Jones, and their daughter, Olivia Farrell.

== Starting too late ==
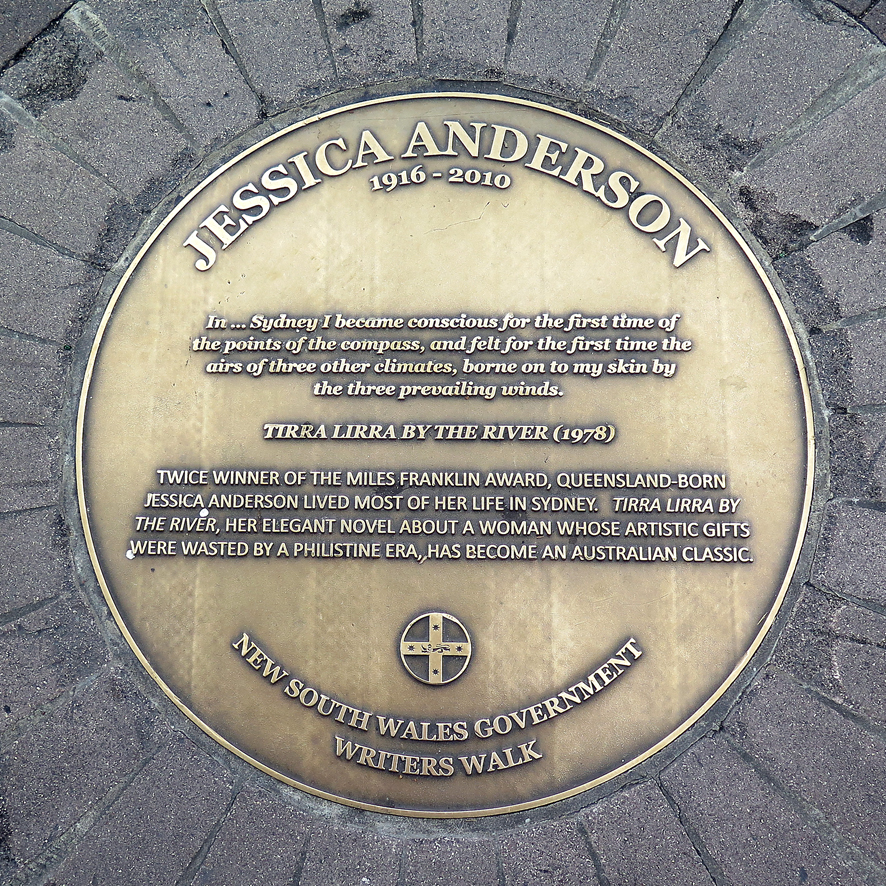
Jessica Anderson Sydney Writers Walk plaque

Anderson was by no means alone in her late emergence onto the literary stage: Geordie Williamson notes that several of Anderson's Australian female contemporaries including Elizabeth Jolley, Olga Masters, and Amy Witting did not begin publishing until they had reached retirement age. He suggests that each of these women was constrained largely by material circumstances, including "the demands of family and work, lack of financial independence, an indifferent publishing environment." When discussing her career, Anderson was quite clear about where her duties lay: "When I was married, and writing at home (writing was my second job; my first was the house) ... I never craved to be out in the workplace." He suggests that, as well as adverse material circumstances, Anderson's career was delayed, and her success mitigated by modesty and a certain "diffidence regarding her gifts." In her own essay entitled "Starting Too Late," Anderson complains that "they are unwilling servants, those skills we learn too late." She would perhaps have described success as such a skill. When asked about how winning awards had affected her life, she replied that:

...it's encouraging to win a prize. But the success of Tirra Lirra, plus the prize it won and the two prizes The Impersonators won, made me feel less private and more vulnerable, and I had to get over that in order to go on at all. I had never been interviewed before, or I had never been asked to be interviewed, and suddenly I had all these interviews. It was a challenge I found hard to meet. I almost wished I had kept writing under a pseudonym as I had begun…

In spite of her late start, Anderson's career as a novelist spanned three decades during which she produced eight critically acclaimed works. Of these, only Tirra Lirra by the River remains in print.

A plaque commemorating Anderson's writing is included in the Sydney Writers Walk.

== Bibliography ==
=== Novels ===
- An Ordinary Lunacy (1963)
- The Last Man's Head (1970)
- The Commandant (1975)
- Tirra Lirra by the River (1978)
- The Impersonators (1980) (Published in the United States as The Only Daughter)
- Taking Shelter (1989)
- One of the Wattle Birds (1994)

=== Short story collections ===
- Stories from the Warm Zone and Sydney Stories (1987)

=== Radio plays ===
- The American (1966) (adaptation of the novel by Henry James)
- The Aspern Papers (1967) (adaptation of the novella by Henry James)
- The Maid's Part (1967)
- Daisy Miller (1968) (adaptation of the novella by Henry James)
- A Tale of Two Cities (1968, serial) (adaptation of the novel by Charles Dickens)
- The Blackmail Caper (1972)
- Quite Sweet, Really (1973)
- Tirra Lirra by the River (1975)
- The Last Man's Head (1983)
