= David Ireland (author) =

Australian writer (1927–2022)

David Ireland AM
- Ireland in 1979
- Born: 24 August 1927; Lakemba, New South Wales, Australia
- Died: 26 July 2022 (aged 94)
- Occupation: Novelist
- Writing career
- Notable works: The Unknown Industrial Prisoner; The Glass Canoe; A Woman of the Future
- Notable awards: Miles Franklin Award (1971, 1976, 1979)

David Neil Ireland AM (24 August 1927 – 26 July 2022) was an Australian novelist.

== Background ==
David Ireland was born in Lakemba in south-west Sydney in New South Wales in 1927.

Before taking up full-time writing in 1973, he undertook the classic writer's apprenticeship by working in a variety of jobs, ranging from greenskeeper to an extended period in the Silverwater oil refinery, on the river downstream of Parramatta.

This latter job inspired his second (and best-known) novel, The Unknown Industrial Prisoner, which brought him recognition in the early 1970s. Many critics still consider it one of the best and most original Australian novels of the period.

== Writings ==
Ireland became a full time writer in his late 40s, and was a prolific novelist from the 1970s to the 1980s, winning the Miles Franklin Award three times (1971, 1976 and 1979). He is one of only four Australian writers to win the Award more than twice; the others are Thea Astley (4) and Tim Winton (4), and Peter Carey (3).

His work concentrates on "... sweeping existential issues and their impact on the lives of those oblivious to them... haunted by the plight of society’s underclasses and the great silence about them. Characters in his early novels are factory workers, the unemployed, the homeless, and those lost to alcohol or beset by mental illness." Van Ikin, 2022.

In 1978, Film Australia offered government funding for a movie of The Unknown Industrial Prisoner. Prime Minister Malcolm Fraser's Home Affairs Minister, Bob Ellicott, intervened to stop this. This was seen as unwelcome political interference in a small but growing Australian film industry. The Glass Canoe was set as a NSW high-school text in 1982, but this attracted complaints.

== Personal life ==
Little is reported. He was married to Elizabeth Ruth Morris from 1955 to 1976, with two sons and two daughters. He married Christine Hayhoe in 1984.

Ireland lived and died in New South Wales, Australia. He died on 26 July 2022 aged 94.

== Honours and awards ==
- 1966 – winner The Advertiser Literary Competition for The Chantic Bird
- 1971 – winner Miles Franklin Award for The Unknown Industrial Prisoner
- 1976 – winner Miles Franklin Award for The Glass Canoe
- 1979 – winner Miles Franklin Award for A Woman of the Future
- 1980 – joint winner The Age Book of the Year Award A Woman of the Future
- 1985 – winner Australian Literature Society Gold Medal for Archimedes and the Seagle

He was appointed a Member of the Order of Australia (AM) in the Queen's Birthday Honours of June 1981.

== Bibliography ==
=== Novels ===
- The Chantic Bird (1968)
- The Unknown Industrial Prisoner (1971)
- The Flesheaters (1972)
- Burn (1974)
- The Glass Canoe (1976)
- A Woman of the Future (1979)
- City of Women (1981)
- Archimedes and the Seagle (1984)
- Bloodfather (1987)
- The Chosen (1997)
- The World Repair Video Game (2015)

=== Drama ===
- Image in the Clay (1964)
