= 1985 in Australian literature =

This article presents a list of the historical events and publications of Australian literature during 1985.

== Events ==
- Christopher Koch won the 1985 Miles Franklin Award for The Doubleman

== Major publications ==
=== Novels ===
- Thea Astley — Beachmasters
- Peter Carey — Illywhacker
- Sumner Locke Elliott — About Tilly Beamis
- David Foster — Dog Rock
- Kate Grenville — Lilian's Story
- Barbara Hanrahan — Annie Magdalene
- Thomas Keneally — A Family Madness
- Christopher Koch — The Doubleman

=== Short story collections ===
- David Malouf — Antipodes
- Olga Masters — A Long Time Dying

=== Crime and mystery ===
- Peter Corris
  - The Big Drop, and Other Cliff Hardy Stories
  - Make Me Rich
  - Pokerface

=== Children's and young adult fiction ===
- Pamela Allen — A Lion in the Night
- Duncan Ball — Selby's Secret
- Thurley Fowler – The Green Wind
- Robin Klein — Halfway Across the Galaxy and Turn Left
- Gillian Rubinstein — Space Demons

=== Poetry ===
- John Blight — Holiday Sea Sonnets
- Robert Gray — Selected Poems 1963-1983
- A. D. Hope — The Age of Reason
- Leonie Kramer and Adrian Mitchell — The Oxford Anthology of Australian Literature
- Judith Rodriguez — "In-Flight Note"
- Chris Wallace-Crabbe — The Amorous Cannibal
- Judith Wright — Phantom Dwelling

=== Drama ===
- Janis Balodis – Too Young for Ghosts
- Jack Davis — No Sugar
- Michael Gow — The Astronaut’s Wife
- Louis Nowra — The Golden Age
- David Williamson — Sons of Cain

=== Non-fiction ===
- John Bryson — Evil Angels

== Awards and honours ==
- Jack Davis AM, for "service to Aboriginal literature and theatre"
- Frank Moorhouse AM, for "service to Australian literature"
- Morris West AM, for "service to literature"

=== Lifetime achievement ===
Award	Author
Christopher Brennan Award	Les Murray
Patrick White Award	Judah Waten (posthumous)

=== Literary awards ===
Award	Author	Title	Publisher
The Age Book of the Year Award	Peter Carey	Illywhacker	University of Queensland Press
ALS Gold Medal	David Ireland	Archimedes and the Seagle	Viking Press
Colin Roderick Award	John Gunn	The Defeat of Distance : Qantas 1919-1939	University of Queensland Press

=== Fiction awards ===
Award	Author	Title	Publisher
The Age Book of the Year Award	Peter Carey	Illywhacker	University of Queensland Press
The Australian/Vogel Literary Award	No award		
Miles Franklin Award	Christopher Koch	The Doubleman	Chatto & Windus
New South Wales Premier's Literary Awards	Elizabeth Jolley	Milk and Honey	Fremantle Arts Centre Press
Victorian Premier's Literary Awards	David Malouf	Antipodes	Chatto and Windus
Western Australian Premier's Book Awards	Tim Winton	Shallows	Allen & Unwin
Western Australian Premier's Book Awards	Tim Winton	Scission and Other Stories	McPhee Gribble

=== Children and Young Adult ===
Award	Category	Author	Title	Publisher
Children's Book of the Year Award	Older Readers	James Aldridge	The True Story of Lilli Stubeck	Hyland House
Children's Book of the Year Award	Picture Book	Not awarded		
New South Wales Premier's Literary Awards	Young People's Literature	Nadia Wheatley	The House that Was Eureka	Penguin

=== Science fiction and fantasy ===
Award	Category	Author	Title	Publisher
Australian SF Achievement Award	Best Australian Science Fiction	Victor Kelleher	The Beast of Heaven	University of Queensland Press

=== Poetry ===
Award	Author	Title	Publisher
Anne Elder Award	Stephen J. Williams	A Crowd of Voices	Pariah Press Co-op
Grace Leven Prize for Poetry	Robert Gray	Selected Poems 1963-1983	Angus and Robertson
Grace Leven Prize for Poetry	Chris Wallace-Crabbe	The Amorous Cannibal	Oxford University Press
Mary Gilmore Award	Doris Brett	The Truth About Unicorns	Jacaranda Press
New South Wales Premier's Literary Awards	Kevin Hart	Your Shadow	Angus & Robertson
Victorian Premier's Literary Awards	Rosemary Dobson	The Three Fates & Other Poems	Hale & Iremonger
Victorian Premier's Literary Awards	Kevin Hart	Your Shadow	Angus & Robertson

=== Drama ===
Award	Category	Author	Title
New South Wales Premier's Literary Awards	Script	Bob Ellis and Paul Cox	My First Wife
New South Wales Premier's Literary Awards	Script	Margaret Kelly, Chris Noonan, Phillip Noyce and Russell Braddon	The Cowra Breakout
New South Wales Premier's Literary Awards	Play	Stephen Sewell	The Blind Giant is Dancing
Victorian Premier's Literary Awards	Drama	David Allen	Cheapside

=== Non-fiction ===
Award	Author	Title	Publisher
The Age Book of the Year Award	Chester Eagle	Mapping the Paddocks	McPhee Gribble
The Age Book of the Year Award	Hugh Lunn	Vietnam: A Reporter's War	University of Queensland Press
New South Wales Premier's Literary Awards	Elsie Webster	The Moon Man	Melbourne University Press
Victorian Premier's Literary Awards	Bernard Smith	The Boy Adeodatus : The Portrait of a Lucky Young Bastard	Allen Lane

== Births ==
A list, ordered by date of birth (and, if the date is either unspecified or repeated, ordered alphabetically by surname) of births in 1985 of Australian literary figures, authors of written works or literature-related individuals follows, including year of death.

Unknown date

- Hannah Kent, historical novelist

== Deaths ==
A list, ordered by date of death (and, if the date is either unspecified or repeated, ordered alphabetically by surname) of deaths in 1985 of Australian literary figures, authors of written works or literature-related individuals follows, including year of birth.

- 26 January — Anne Spencer Parry, pioneer fantasy writer (born 1931)
- 14 February — Douglas Stewart, poet, short story writer, essayist and literary editor (born 1913)
- 19 April — John Manifold, poet and critic (born 1915)
- 5 May — Carter Brown, writer of detective fiction (born in England, 1923)
- 18 July — F. B. Vickers, novelist (born 1903)
- 29 July — Judah Waten, novelist (born 1911)
- 11 September — Eleanor Dark, novelist (born 1901)
- 4 November — A. A. Phillips, writer, critic and teacher, best known for coining the term "Cultural Cringe" (born 1900)

== See also ==
- 1985 in Australia
- 1985 in literature
- 1985 in poetry
- List of years in literature
- List of years in Australian literature
