= 1984 in Australian literature =

This article presents a list of the historical events and publications of Australian literature during 1984.

== Events ==
- Tim Winton’s Shallows won the 1984 Miles Franklin Award

== Major publications ==
=== Novels ===
- Sumner Locke Elliott — About Tilly Beamis
- Helen Garner — The Children's Bach
- Nicholas Hasluck — The Bellarmine Jug
- David Ireland — Archimedes and the Seagle
- Peter Kocan — The Treatment; and, the Cure
- Elizabeth Jolley — Milk and Honey
- Amanda Lohrey — The Morality of Gentlemen
- David Malouf — Harland's Half Acre
- Jill Neville — Last Ferry to Manly
- Randolph Stow — The Suburbs of Hell
- Tim Winton — Shallows

=== Crime and mystery ===
- Marshall Browne — Dark Harbour
- Peter Corris — Heroin Annie and Other Cliff Hardy Stories
- Evan Green — Alice to Nowhere
- Tony Kenrick — Blast
- William Marshall — The Far Away Man

=== Science fiction and fantasy ===
- A. Bertram Chandler — The Wild Ones
- Victor Kelleher — The Beast of Heaven
- Keith Taylor — Bard II
- Cherry Wilder
  - A Princess of the Chameln
  - Yorath the Wolf

=== Short story anthologies ===
- John Morrison — Stories of the Waterfront

=== Children's and young adult fiction ===
- James Aldridge — The True Story of Lilli Stubeck
- Robin Klein — Hating Alison Ashley
- Emily Rodda — Something Special
- Nadia Wheatley — Dancing in the Anzac Deli

=== Poetry ===
- John Barnes and Brian McFarlane – Cross Country : A Book of Australian Verse
- Doris Brett — The Truth about Unicorns
- Chris Wallace-Crabbe and Peter Pierce (editors) — Clubbing the Gunfire : 101 Australian War Poems
- Rosemary Dobson — The Three Fates & Other Poems
- Robert Gray — The Skylight
- Syd Harrex — Atlantis and Other Islands
- Kevin Hart — Your Shadow
- Les Murray — "The Dream of Wearing Shorts Forever"
- Dorothy Porter — The Night Parrot

== Awards and honours ==
- Nancy Cato AM, for "service to Australian literature"
- John Manifold AM, for "service literature as a poet and musician
- Dorothy Auchterlonie Green OAM, for "service to Australian literature"

=== Lifetime achievement ===
| Award | Author |
|---|---|
| Christopher Brennan Award | Not awarded |
| Patrick White Award | Rosemary Dobson |

=== Literary awards ===
| Award | Author | Title | Publisher |
|---|---|---|---|
| The Age Book of the Year Award | Nicholas Hasluck | The Bellarmine Jug | Penguin |
| ALS Gold Medal | Les Murray | The People's Otherworld : Poems | Angus and Robertson |
| Colin Roderick Award | Alan Gould | The Man Who Stayed Below | Angus and Robertson |
| NSW Premier's Special Award | Marjorie Barnard | | |

=== Fiction awards ===
| Award | Author | Title | Publisher |
|---|---|---|---|
| The Age Book of the Year Award | Nicholas Hasluck | The Bellarmine Jug | Penguin |
| The Australian/Vogel Literary Award | Kate Grenville | Lilian's Story | Allen and Unwin |
| Miles Franklin Award | Tim Winton | Shallows | Allen and Unwin |
| New South Wales Premier's Literary Awards | Beverley Farmer | Milk | McPhee Gribble |
| Western Australian Premier's Book Awards | T. A. G. Hungerford | Stories From Suburban Road | Fremantle Arts Centre Press |

=== Children and Young Adult ===
| Award | Category | Author | Title | Publisher |
|---|---|---|---|---|
| Children's Book of the Year Award | Older Readers | Patricia Wrightson | A Little Fear | Hutchinson |
| Children's Book of the Year Award | Picture Book | Pamela Allen | Bertie and the Bear | Nelson Books |
| New South Wales Premier's Literary Awards | Young People's Literature | Mem Fox and Julie Vivas | Possum Magic | Omnibus Books |

=== Science fiction and fantasy ===
| Award | Category | Author | Title | Publisher |
|---|---|---|---|---|
| Australian SF Achievement Award | Best Australian Science Fiction | George Turner | Yesterday's Men | Faber & Faber |

=== Poetry ===
| Award | Author | Title | Publisher |
|---|---|---|---|
| Anne Elder Award | Doris Brett | The Truth About Unicorns | Jacaranda Press |
| Anne Elder Award | Max Richards | Under Mount Egmont and Other Poems | Neptune Press |
| Grace Leven Prize for Poetry | Rosemary Dobson | The Three Fates & Other Poems | Hale & Iremonger |
| New South Wales Premier's Literary Awards | Les Murray | The People's Otherworld : Poems | Angus & Robertson |

=== Drama ===
| Award | Category | Author | Title |
|---|---|---|---|
| New South Wales Premier's Literary Awards | Script | Michael Jenkins | Careful, He Might Hear You |
| New South Wales Premier's Literary Awards | Script | Robert Caswell | Scales of Justice |
| New South Wales Premier's Literary Awards | Play | Warwick Moss | Down an Alley Filled with Cats |

=== Non-fiction ===
| Award | Author | Title | Publisher |
|---|---|---|---|
| The Age Book of the Year Award | John Rickard | H.B. Higgins: The Rebel and Judge | Allen and Unwin |
| New South Wales Premier's Literary Awards | Sylvia Lawson | The Archibald Paradox | Allen Lane |

== Deaths ==
A list, ordered by date of death (and, if the date is either unspecified or repeated, ordered alphabetically by surname) of deaths in 1984 of Australian literary figures, authors of written works or literature-related individuals follows, including year of birth.

- 21 January — Alan Marshall, writer, story teller, humanist and social documenter (born 1902)
- 12 March — Peg Maltby, artist, book illustrator and children's writer (born 1899 in England)
- 6 June — A. Bertram Chandler, mariner-turned-science fiction writer (born 1912)
- 24 June — Francis Brabazon, poet and member of Meher Baba's mandali (born 1907)
- 29 September — Hal Porter, novelist, playwright, poet and short story writer (1911)
- 10 November — Xavier Herbert, writer (born 1901)
- 10 December — Jean Campbell, novelist (born 1901)
- 23 December — Joan Lindsay, novelist, playwright, essayist and visual artist (born 1896)

== See also ==
- 1984 in Australia
- 1984 in literature
- 1984 in poetry
- List of years in literature
- List of years in Australian literature
