= The Iremonger Award =

The Iremonger Award for Writing on Public Issues is an annual Australian literary prize that was awarded from 2003 to 2009 by Australian publisher Allen & Unwin to commemorate publisher and author John Iremonger and "foster the sort of ideas that he was so good at cultivating". The award is made "for works of political, social and cultural commentary with contemporary Australian relevance" and offers a prize of $10,000 as well as guaranteed publication, royalties and editorial support.

The judges for the first award, made in 2004, included Anne Manne and David Marr. The award has three judges, one from Allen & Unwin and two independent judges who "know what’s happening at the moment and have a unique perspective".

In 2009, Allen & Unwin announced that no manuscript of sufficient merit had been submitted for the award, which would therefore be suspended for the foreseeable future. Should the award be revived, details will be announced on the Allen & Unwin website.

== John Iremonger ==
John Iremonger, who died of cancer in August 2002, worked in the publishing industry in Australia for 35 years. He started the independent publishing company, Hale & Iremonger, in 1977, with Greens MP, Sylvia Hale, but left the partnership in 1980 to join Allen & Unwin when its publishing director Patrick Gallagher offered him a job. Iremonger's career at Allen & Unwin lasted 22 years, which included a four-year break to run Melbourne University Press. He was also an editor of the ANU Historical Journal in 1966, and a member of the editorial committee in 1967.

"He had an enormous impact on Australian publishing. He had a deeply inquiring mind, a strong sense of what was right and wrong and a deep human compassion".

== Winners ==
- 2004: Australian Heartlands: Making Space for Hope in the Suburbs by Brendan Gleeson
- 2005: Inside Spin by Bob Burton
- 2006: The End of Charity by Nic Frances with Maryrose Cuskelly
- 2007: Once Were Radicals by Irfan Yusuf
- 2008: A Sorry State of Affairs by Stephen Gray
