= George McWhirter =

Irish-Canadian writer and poet (born 1939)

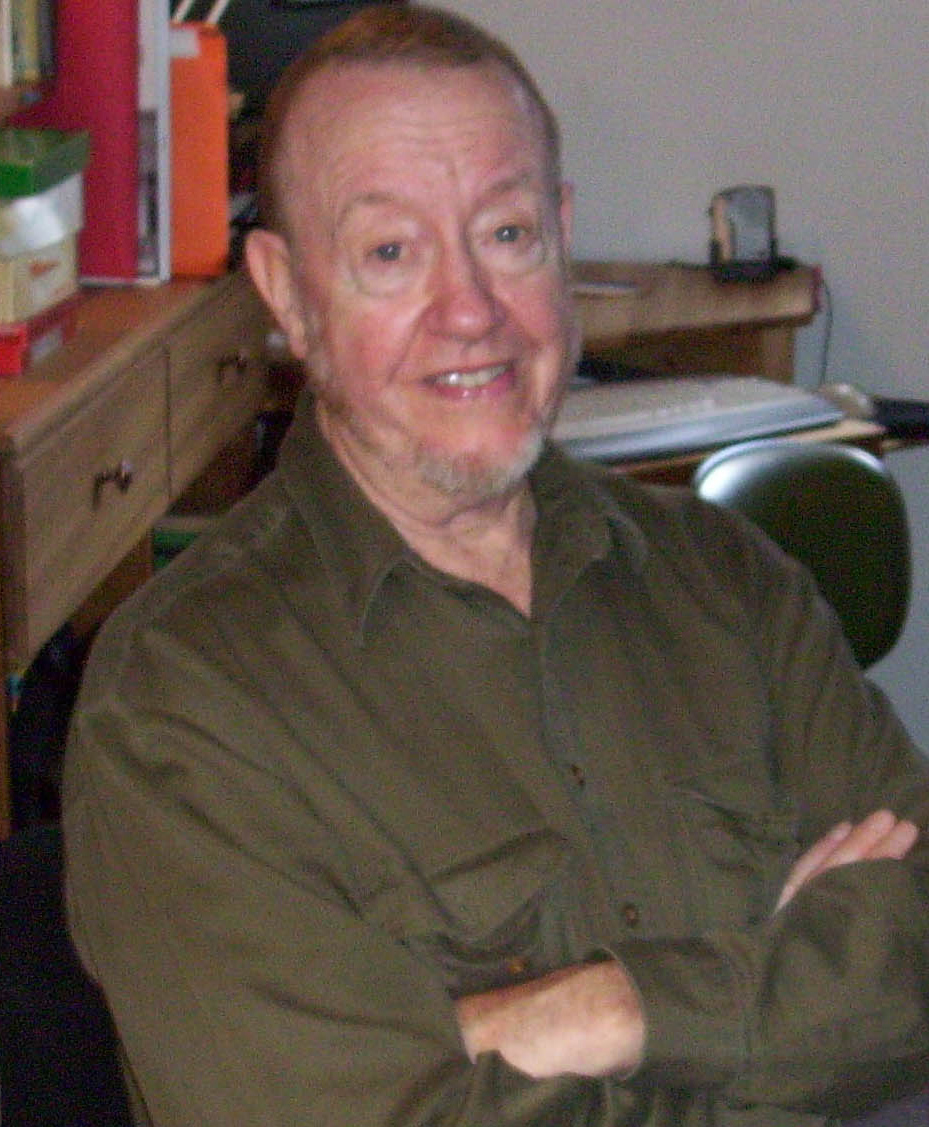
- Born: September 26, 1939 (age 87); Belfast, Northern Ireland
- Occupation: poet

George McWhirter (born September 26, 1939) is an Irish-Canadian writer, translator, editor, teacher and Vancouver's first Poet Laureate.

The son of a shipyard worker, George McWhirter was raised in a large extended family on the Shankill Road in Belfast. He and his extended family spent the war years and then weekends and the summers at their seaside bungalow in Carnalea, now a suburb of Bangor, County Down. In 1957 he began a "combined scholarship" studying English and Spanish at Queen's University, Belfast, and education at Stranmillis College, Belfast. His tutor at Queen's was the poet Laurence Lerner, and he was a classmate with the future literary critic Robert Dunbar and the poets Seamus Heaney and Seamus Deane. After graduating, McWhirter taught in Kilkeel and Bangor, County Down, Northern Ireland, and in Barcelona, Spain, before moving to Port Alberni, B.C. Canada. After receiving his M.A. from the University of British Columbia (UBC), where he studied under Michael Bullock and J. Michael Yates, he stayed on to become a full professor in 1982 and head of the Creative Writing Department from 1983 to 1993. He retired as a professor emeritus in 2005. He was associated with PRISM international magazine from 1968 to 2005. McWhirter is the author and editor of numerous books and the recipient of many awards. His first book of poetry, Catalan Poems, was a joint winner of the first Commonwealth Poetry Prize with Chinua Achebe's Beware, Soul Brother. He was made a life member of the League of Canadian Poets in 2005 and is also a member of the Writers' Union of Canada and PEN International. In March 2007, he was named Vancouver's inaugural Poet Laureate for a two-year term. He currently writes full-time and lives in Vancouver with his wife. They have two children and three granddaughters.

== Bibliography ==
=== Poetry ===
- Catalan Poems (1971, winner of the 1972 Commonwealth Poetry Prize, shared with Chinua Achebe)
- Queen of the Sea (1976)
- Twenty-Five (1978)
- The Island Man (1981)
- Fire before Dark (1983)
- A Staircase for All Souls (1996)
- Incubus: The Dark Side of the Light (1997)
- The Book of Contradictions (2002)
- The Incorrection (2007, finalist for the Dorothy Livesay Poetry Prize)
- The Anachronicles (2008)

=== Fiction ===
- Bodyworks (1974)
- God's Eye (1981)
- Coming to Grips with Lucy (1982)
- A Bad Day to Be Winning (1984)
- Paula Lake (1985)
- Cage (1987, winner of the Ethel Wilson Fiction Prize)
- The Listeners (1991)
- Musical Dogs (1996)
- A Gift of Women (2014)

=== Anthologies edited ===
- Contemporary Poetry of British Columbia (1970, with J. Michael Yates and Andreas Schroeder)
- Words From Inside: Prison Arts Foundation (1974, 1975)
- Where Words Like Monarchs Fly: A Cross-generational Anthology of Mexican Poets in Translation (1998)
- A Verse Map of Vancouver (2009)

=== Selected poems edited and translations ===
- Jose Emilio Pacheco: Selected Poems (New Directions, New York, 1987, winner of the F.R. Scott Prize for Translation)
- Eyes to See Otherwise/Ojos de Otro by Homero Aridjis (Carcanet Press, 2001, New Directions, New York, 2002, with Betty Aridjis)
- Solar Poems/Poemas Solares by Homero Aridjis (City Lights, San Francisco, 2010)
- Tiempo de angeles/Time of Angels by Homero Ardjis, Contributions by Francisco Toledo (FONDO DE CULTURA ECONOMICA, Mexico, 2012, City Lights, San Francisco, 2012)
- The Selected Poetry of Gabriel Zaid (Paul Dry Books, Philadelphia, 2014)
- Poemas traducidos by Gabriel Zaid, George McWhirter: Principal English Translator (El Colegio Nacional, Mexico,2022)
- self-portrait in the zone of silence by Homero Aridjis (New Directions, New York, 2023) Winner of the 2024 Griffin Poetry Prize

=== In Anthology ===
- New Generation Poetry (Ann Arbor Review Book, 1971)
- Soundings '72 (Blackstaff Press, 1972)
- The Wearing of the Black An Anthology of Contemporary Ulster Poetry (Blackstaff Press, 1974)
- The Penguin Book of Canadian Verse (Penguin Books, 1975)
- New: West Coast: 72 Contemporary BC Poets (Intermedia,1977)
- The Poets of Canada (Hurtig,1978)
- Ilusion Two: fables, fantasies and metafictions (Aya Press,1983)
- Shoes and Shit: STORIES FOR PEDESTRIANS (Aya Press, 1984)
- Aproximaciones Translated by Jose Emilio Pacheco (Editorial Penelope, Mexico, 1984)
- Vancouver Soul of a City (Douglas & McIntyre, 1986)
- Moving Off the Map: from "story" to "fiction" (Black Moss Press,1986)
- The Blackstaff book of Short Stories (Blackstaff Press, 1988)
- Compañeros: An Anthology of Writings about Latin America (Cormorant Books,1990)
- The Second Book of Blackstaff Short Stories (Blackstaff Press, 1991)
- Best Canadian Stories (Oberon Press, 1991)
- Witness to Wilderness: The Clayoquot Sound Anthology (Arsenal Pulp Press, 1994)
- Thru the Smoky End Boards: Canadian Poetry About Sports & Games (Polestar, 1996)
- Irish Writing in the Twentieth Century (Cork University Press, 2000)
- When I Was a Child:Stories for Grown-ups and Children (Oberon Press, 2003)
- THE BLACKBIRD'S NEST An Anthology of Poetry from Queen's University Belfast (Blackstaff Press, 2003)
- In Fine Form The Canadian Book of Form Poetry (Polestar, 2005)
- LONG JOURNEY Contemporary Northwest Poets (OSU Press, 2006)
- JAILBREAKS: 99 Canadian Sonnets (Biblioasis, 2008)
- ROCKSALT: An Anthology of Contemporary BC Poetry (Mother Tongue Press, 2008)
- How the Light Gets in ... Anthology of Poetry from Canada (Waterford Institute of Technology, Ireland, 2009)
- The Stony Thursday Book: A Collection of Contemporary Poetry (Limerick, Ireland, 2010)
- Making Waves: Reading BC and Pacific Northwest Literature (Anvil Press,2010)
- CVC Carter V. Cooper Short Fiction Anthology Series Book Three (EXILE editions,2013)
- Naked in Academe: Celebrating Fifty Years of Creative Writing at UBC (McClelland & Stewart,2014)
- Pulp Literature Issue 9, Winter 2016 (Pulp Literature Press, 2016)
- CLI FI:Canadian Tales of Climate Change (EXILE editions, 2017)
- Legions of the Sun: Poems of the Great War edited with an introduction by Joseph Hutchinson (Harmony Hill Press, 2018)
- Ghost Fishing: An Eco-Justice Poetry Anthology (University of Georgia Press, 2018)
- Griffin Poetry Prize Anthology 2024 (House of Anansi Press Inc., 2024)
- BEYOND THE CONCERT HALL: An Anthology of Sound (Laberinto Press, 2026)
- POETIC ODYSSEYS: An Anthology from the UBC Emeritus College (Ekstasis Editions, 2026)

=== Plays ===
- 1981 "Don't Go Walking on the Water", Vancouver: CBC Radio Network
- 1981 "The Listeners", Vancouver: CBC Radio Network
- 2009 "Hecuba" by Euripides (translation), produced by Blackbird Theatre at the Vancouver East Cultural Centre
- 2016 "The House of Bernarda Alba" by Federico Garcia Lorca, (translation) workshop and reading at the Carnegie Centre, organized by Luisa Jojic and directed by Rachel Peake.

== Awards and honours ==
- 1969 Macmillan Prize for Poetry (University of British Columbia)
- 1972 Commonwealth Poetry Prize
- 1987 F.R. Scott Prize for Translation (League of Canadian Poets)
- 1988 The Ethel Wilson Fiction Prize (The B.C. Book Prizes)
- 1998 The University of British Columbia Killam Teaching Prize
- 2004 Killam Award for Excellence in Mentoring
- 2005 League of Canadian Poets Life Membership for Outstanding service to the League and the poetry community
- 2005 Sam Black Award for Excellence in Education & Development in the Visual and Performing Arts, University of British Columbia
- 2008 Mayor's Arts Award inaugural Poet Laureate 2007-2009 City of Vancouver
- 2024 Griffin Poetry Prize for Translation
