= Timoshenko Aslanides =

Australian poet (1943–2020)

Timoshenko Aslanides (24 December 1943 – 6 January 2020) was an Australian poet.

== Biography ==
Timoshenko Aslanides was born on Christmas Eve, 1943, in the Crown Street Women's Hospital, in Sydney, to John Paul Aslanides (1901–1962), a 1925 immigrant to Australia from the Pontic Greek community in Kerasus (on the Black Sea coast) and Olive Emma Browne (1910–1993), daughter of a pastoralist family from Lockhart, New South Wales. Aslanides graduated BA (Music) from the University of Sydney in 1967 and B.Ec from the Australian National University in 1976.

He began writing poetry after he moved to Canberra in 1972, where he joined the Australian Public Service. His first book of poems, The Greek Connection, won him the British Commonwealth Poetry Prize for 1978 for the best first book of poetry in English published the previous year in the British Commonwealth excluding England; he was the first Australian to win this prize.

He produced 16 books of poetry. His fourth book of poetry, Australian Things, was awarded joint second prize in the 1988 bicentennial poetry awards for book-length collections. This book was inspired by a remark, in a conversation with his mentor, by Judith Wright, who had written to him in November 1979, inviting him to lunch at her bush-cottage retreat near Braidwood, in southern New South Wales. Aslanides regarded the subsequent and enduring friendship with Judith Wright as both an apprenticeship as well as a rewarding artistic relationship for both poets.

Because he was Australian-born and Australian-focussed and, since July 1985, a full-time professional Australian poet, he did not identify as an "ethnic" poet; nor did he write "multicultural" poetry. Though he felt that most, if not all of his poetry has its origin in love, the context of this affection is the celebration of the natural and built environments of Australia, and the history and imaginative genius of the people.

Timoshenko Aslanides worked as a full-time, professional poet from July 1985, when he resigned from the Public Service.

== Awards ==
- British Commonwealth Poetry Prize, 1978.
- Australian Bicentennial Literary Awards, (joint second prize), 1988
- The Canberra Times Artist of the Year, 2002.

== Publications ==
- The Greek Connection, The author, Canberra 1977. 52pp.
- Passacaglia and Fugue, The author, Canberra 1979 and 1980 (two editions). 50pp
- Goulburn and Environs: A comprehensive guide with Jenny Stewart, Canberra, Olive Press, 1983. 152pp.
- One Hundred Riddles, Angus and Robertson, 1984. 72pp.
- Canberra and the Australian Capital Territory, with Jenny Stewart, Kenthurst, N.S.W., Kangaroo Press, 1988
- Australian Things, Ringwood, Victoria, Penguin, 1990. 72pp.
- Australian Alphabet, Springwood, N.S.W.: Butterfly Books, 1992. 78pp.
- AnniVersaries: 366 Linked Poems, one for every day of the Australian year, Rose Bay, N.S.W., Brandl & Schlesinger, 1998. 454pp.
- A Calendar of Flowers: Selected Poems 1975-2000, Wollongong, N.S.W.: Five Islands Press, 2001. 114pp.
- Occasions for words: poems for birth, marriage, death and much between, Adelaide, SA: Wakefield Press 2006. 196pp.
- Ruminations: Two Books of Lyric Mysticism, Port Adelaide, S. Aust.: Ginninderra Press, 2008. 72pp.
- Collected Sonnets, 1974-2004, Port Adelaide, S. Aust.: Ginninderra Press, 2010. 86pp.
- Stop Words, Ormond, Vic.: Hybrid Publishers, 2011. 87pp.
- Versatility or, a justification for poetry, Ormond, Vic.: Hybrid Publishers, 2013. 30pp. Includes CD of first performance.
- Temperament: twenty-four love poems, one in each key, Ormond, Vic.: Hybrid Publishers, 2013. 38pp.
- Letterature: Verse letters from Australian women, Ormond, Vic.: Hybrid Publishers, 2014. 80pp.
- Troubadour: poetry and original music for violin, Ormond, Vic.: Hybrid Publishers, 2016. 77pp.
