= Belinda (Allen book) =

Book by Pamela Allen

- First edition
- Author: Pamela Allen
- Illustrator: Pamela Allen
- Language: English
- Genre: Children's picture book
- Published: 1992
- Publisher: Viking Press Australia
- Publication place: Australia
- Media type: Print (paperback)
- Pages: unpaginated (28)
- Awards: Russell Clark Award (shortlist), CBCA Picture Book of the Year (Honour), KOALA Hall of Fame
- ISBN: 978-0140544930

Belinda is a 1992 children's picture book written and illustrated by Pamela Allen.

== Plot summary ==
The book tells the story of a cow that is particular about who milks her and the lengths a man takes to do so.

== Reception ==
Belinda has been generally well received. Kirkus Reviews wrote "Allen's lively story is as succinct and neatly honed as a folktale, while her deftly designed illustrations .. are splendidly witty." and concluded "A delightful offering from this much-honored New Zealander/Australian; perfect to share with a group." and Publishers Weekly wrote "Milk, mayhem and more add up to gallons of fun." It has also been reviewed by the School Library Journal and Horn Book Magazine

Belinda has been studied in schools, was shortlisted for the 1992 Russell Clark Award, is a 1993 Children's Book Council of Australia Picture Book of the Year Honour book, and is in the Kids Own Australian Literature Awards (KOALA) Hall of Fame, having been shortlisted for a KOALA 5 times in 10 years.

In 2001 it was amongst the top 100 Australian Children's books held in Australian educational libraries.
