= The Three Fates & Other Poems =

1984 Australian poetry collection by Rosemary Dobson

- Author: Rosemary Dobson
- Language: English
- Genre: Poetry collection
- Publisher: Hale & Iremonger
- Publication date: 1984
- Publication place: Australia
- Media type: Print
- Pages: 67 pp.
- Awards: 1984 Grace Leven Prize for Poetry, winner; 1985 Victorian Premier's Literary Awards, joint winner

The Three Fates & Other Poems is a collection of poems edited and written by Australian poet Rosemary Dobson, published by Hale & Iremonger in 1984.

The collection contains 43 poems from a variety of sources.

It was the winner of the 1984 Grace Leven Prize for Poetry.

== Contents ==
- "The Three Fates"
- "Flute Music"
- "Ravines and Fireflies"
- "The Eater of the Pomegranate Seeds"
- "Rain Forest"
- "Daily Living : Willows"
- "Daily Living : Waiting for the Postman"
- "Daily Living : Visiting"
- "Daily Living : Taken by Surprise"
- "Daily Living : Folding the Sheets"
- "Daily Living : The Letter"
- "Daily Living : The Friend"
- "The Nightmare"
- "A Letter to Lydia"
- "A Good-Bye"
- "The Messages"
- "White Flowers"
- "Exchanges"
- "The House"
- "The Flute-Player"
- "Translations Under the Trees"
- "At the Coast"
- "Poems of the River Wang"
- "On Nearly Quarrelling"
- "The Good Host"
- "After Receiving the Book of Poems by Li Po"
- "Good Friday, Boston"
- "Staten Island Ferry"
- "New York Spring"
- "Salt"
- "Above the Bay"
- "On Museums : In the Museum"
- "The Museum 2 (On Museums : Museums)"
- "On Museums : Their Purpose"
- "On Museums : Closed Museums"
- "Shaped Poetry"
- "The Message"
- "The Sanctuary on Overton Hill, Wiltshire"
- "The Stone Circles"

== Critical reception ==
In The Bulletin critic Geoffrey Dutton commented that the poet shows "an extraordinarily good eye for the movement of detail that is about to become the stillness of poetry. There is also a generous but not docile sharing of people, poems, paintings, and, above all, time."

Philip Martin, writing in Australian Book Review noted: "For me at least, the poems which stand out beyond the others in a fairly even collection, pleasurable throughout, are those which look squarely at the truths of death and ageing, and do so without self-pity but with much compassion." Of the poet he found that her "eye is sharp for the telling and terrible detail, but without belittling anything."

== Awards ==
- 1984 Grace Leven Prize for Poetry.
- 1985 Victorian Premier's Literary Awards, joint winner

== See also ==
- 1984 in Australian literature
