= Sylvia Hale =

Australian politician

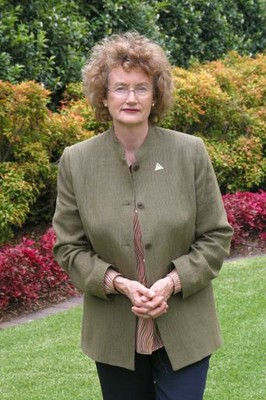

Member of the New South Wales Legislative Council
- In office 22 March 2003 – 6 September 2010
- Succeeded by: David Shoebridge

Personal details
- Born: 12 July 1942 (age 84)
- Party: Greens (since 2000)
- Other political affiliations: Labor (1961); No Aircraft Noise (1994−1995)
- Education: University of Sydney; UNSW Sydney
- Website: Sylvia Hale MLC

Sylvia Phyllis Hale (born 12 July 1942) is an Australian social justice, community and environmental campaigner, and a former politician. She was a member of the New South Wales Legislative Council from 2003 to 2010 for the Greens.

== Personal life ==
Hale graduated from the University of Sydney in 1964 with a Bachelor of Arts and Diploma in Education; and graduated from the University of NSW in 1998 with a LLB. In 1961, while at Sydney University, Hale was the President of the Sydney University Labor Club. In 1970, Hale was involved in the Socialist Review Group, a Trotskyist group which was the precursor to the Socialist Workers Party. However, she left due to the "Group's opposition to "deep entry" into the Australian Labor Party".

In 1965, she and her husband, Roger Barnes, established specialist book printers, Southwood Press. In 1977, she, Barnes and John Iremonger started the independent publishing company, Hale & Iremonger.

== Political career ==
After the proposed construction of the third runway at Sydney Airport in 1994, she became a member of No Aircraft Noise. She was later elected a councillor on Marrickville Council in 1995 for the party. She joined the Greens in 2000 and continued to serve on Marickville Council until 2004.

She was elected to the upper house of the New South Wales parliament in 2003.

In 2010, Hale announced that she would be retiring from the Upper House at the next year's state election to allow her preselected replacement, David Shoebridge, to contest the upcoming election as a sitting MP. She subsequently sought preselection for the state seat of Marrickville. She however failed to win her party's endorsement, losing 15–14 to local councillor Fiona Byrne. She eventually resigned her seat in September 2010.

== After politics ==
After leaving politics, Hale became a spokeswoman for Welcome to Palestine, and was briefly detained by Israeli authorities at Tel Aviv airport. In 2019, she was elected Co-Convenor of The Greens NSW along with Rochelle Flood, and in 2020 elected as Convenor.
