= Nicholas Hasluck =

Author and former judge in Western Australia

Nicholas Hasluck AM
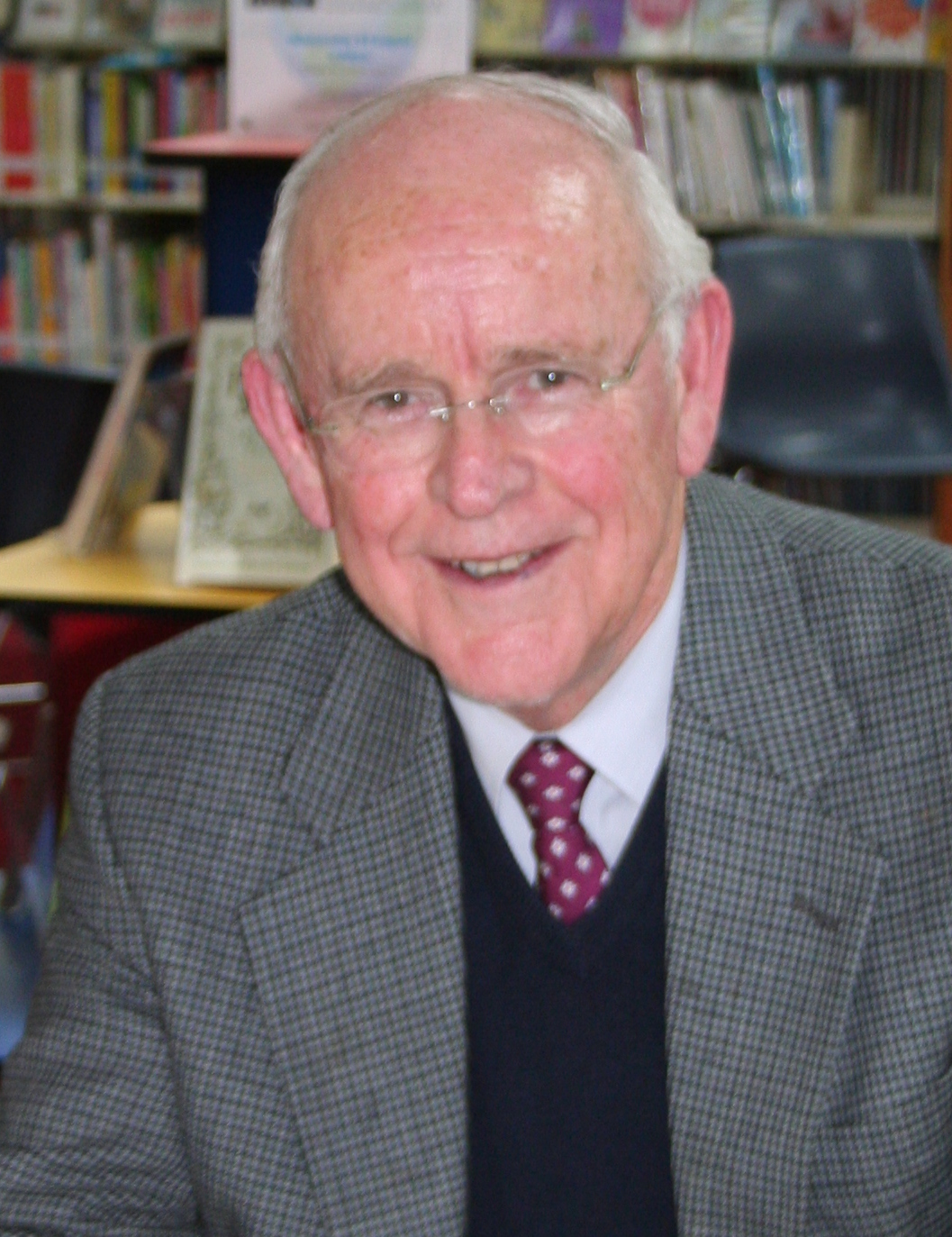
- Nicholas Hasluck at the Mosman Library, July 2011
- Born: Nicholas Paul Hasluck; 17 October 1942 (age 83); Canberra, A.C.T.
- Occupations: Novelist, judge
- Parents: Paul Hasluck; Alexandra Hasluck
- Writing career
- Language: English
- Notable works: The Bellarmine Jug, The Country Without Music
- Notable awards: The Age Book of the Year, Western Australian Premier's Book Awards

Nicholas Paul Hasluck (born 17 October 1942) is an Australian novelist, poet, short story writer, and former judge.

== Early life ==
Nicholas Hasluck was born in Canberra. His father, Sir Paul Hasluck was a minister in the Federal Government under Robert Menzies, and was later appointed Governor-General of Australia. Nicholas went to school at Scotch College, Perth, and Canberra Grammar School, before studying law at University of Western Australia (1963) and Oxford (1966).

== Legal career ==
After completing his studies, Hasluck worked briefly in Fleet Street in London as an editorial assistant before returning to Australia in 1967 to work as a solicitor, initially in partnership with Robert Holmes à Court. He was a partner in the law firm Keall Brinsden from 1971 to 1984. While working as a barrister from 1985 to 2000 he was appointed Queen's Counsel in 1988 and served as part-time President of the Equal Opportunity Tribunal (WA). He was deputy chair of the Australia Council from 1978 to 1982 and was made a Member of the Order of Australia (AM). He served as Chair of the Literature Board from 1998 to 2001 and as Chair of the Art Gallery of Western Australia from 2014 to 2018.

On 1 May 2000, Hasluck was appointed a judge on the Supreme Court of Western Australia, which is the highest ranking court in the State of Western Australia. He retired as a judge on 5 May 2010.

== Writing career ==
Hasluck started writing at school, producing poetry and essays for the school magazine and was first professionally published in 1964 with a poem appearing in Westerly literary magazine.

Hasluck's books fall into two categories, which he describes as "moral thriller genre and satire", with the thriller interesting him the most. He cites the American writers William Faulkner, Saul Bellow, Norman Mailer and Gore Vidal as his main literary influences.

In 2006, Hasluck became Chairperson of the Commonwealth Writers' Prize. He completed his term in 2011.

== Awards ==
- 1984 - winner The Age Book of the Year Award Imaginative Writing Prize and Book of the Year The Bellarmine Jug
- 1987 - shortlisted Miles Franklin Award for Truant State
- 1991 - shortlisted Miles Franklin Award for The Country Without Music
- 1991 - joint winner Western Australian Premier's Book Awards for The Country Without Music
- 1999 - shortlisted Western Australian Premier's Book Awards for Our Man K

== Bibliography ==
=== Novels ===
- Quarantine (1978)
- The Blue Guitar (1980)
- The Hand That Feeds You (1982)
- The Bellarmine Jug (1984)
- Truant State (1987)
- The Country Without Music (1990)
- The Blosseville File (1992)
- A Grain of Truth (1994)
- Our Man K (1999)
- Dismissal (2011)
- Rooms in the City (2014)
- The Bradshaw Case (2016)
- Che's Last Embrace (2022)

=== Short story collections ===
- The Hat on the Letter 'O' and Other Stories (1978; revised edition 1990)
- Wobbling the Whiteboard (under the pseudonym "Kim Lee") (2003)

=== Poetry ===
- Anchor and Other Poems (1976)
- On the Edge (1981)
- A Dream Divided (2004)

=== Non-fiction ===
- Chinese Journey (1985) (with Christopher Koch)
- Collage: Recollections and Images of the University of Western Australia (1987), essays
- Offcuts From a Legal Literary Life (1993), essays
- The Legal Labyrinth (2003)
- The Hasluck Banner (2006)
- Somewhere in the Atlas: The Road to Khe Sanh and Other Travel Pieces (2007)
- Legal Limits (2013)
- Jigsaw: Patterns in law and literature (2018)
- Beyond the Equator: An Australian Memoir (2019)
- Rollo's Way (2020)

=== Plays ===
- Van M (1990)

=== Selected articles ===
- "Keating takes the Comets on a learning curve". Quadrant. 39 (7–8): 12–15. July–August 1995.
- "Kafka's penal colony revisited". Quadrant. 40 (7–8 [328]): 45–47. July–August 1996.
- "Gore Vidal: Radical Contrarian". Quadrant. January–February 2015.
- "Judicial Activism". Quadrant. May 2016.
- "Recognition Roulette". Quadrant. October 2017.

== See also ==
- Judiciary of Australia
