= Clippity-Clop =

1994 children's picture book by Pamela Allen

- Author: Pamela Allen
- Illustrator: Pamela Allen
- Language: English
- Genre: Children's picture book
- Published: 1994
- Publisher: Puffin Books Australia
- Publication place: Australia
- Media type: Print (paperback)
- Pages: unpaginated (30)
- ISBN: 978-0140553321
- OCLC: 773296005

Clippity-Clop is a 1994 children's picture book written and illustrated by Pamela Allen. It is about a little old man and a woman, and their two donkeys, laden down with goods, that will not move.

== Plot ==
The protagonists, a little old man and a lady load goods, a parrot, that squawks throughout the story, and a cat, that miaows throughout the story, onto two donkeys. They then attempt to move the donkeys without success. The man ignores the lady's warning and, resorts to using a whip to move his donkey. The donkey doesn't like this, and runs away. The man chases after the donkey, eventually catches it, and entices the donkey to follow him with carrots. The donkey eats so many carrots that the man has to carry it. Meanwhile, the lady, who was left behind, reappears riding her donkey, having tied a carrot to her whip to encourage the donkey to move. She overtakes the man with her donkey happily chasing the carrot, and the cat is also pleased.

== Reception ==
Clippity-Clop has been reviewed by Reading Time and Magpies. "Like other books by this award-winning author, the sound effects are wonderful." It has been taught/read at school.

The Canberra Times listed it amongst its "Best of '94" children's books.
