= Emily Eyefinger =

Emily Eyefinger is a series of children's books written by Duncan Ball and illustrated by Craig Smith. They are about a girl who was born with an eye on the end of her finger.

1. Emily Eyefinger (Simon & Schuster Books for Young Readers, 1992)
2. Emily Eyefinger, Secret Agent (Simon & Schuster Books for Young Readers, 1993)
3. Emily Eyefinger and the Lost Treasure (Simon & Schuster Books for Young Readers, 1994)
4. Emily Eyefinger and the Black Volcano (Angus & Robertson, 2000)
5. Emily Eyefinger's Alien Adventure (Angus & Robertson, 2001)
6. Emily Eyefinger and the Devil Bones (HarperCollins, 2002)
7. Emily Eyefinger and the Balloon Bandits (Angus & Robertson, 2003)
8. Emily Eyefinger and the Ghost Ship (Angus & Robertson, 2004)
9. Emily Eyefinger and the Puzzle in the Jungle (Angus & Robertson, 2005)
10. Emily Eyefinger and the City in the Sky (HarperCollins, 2006)
11. Emily Eyefinger and the Secret from the Sea (HarperCollins, 2012)

Collected volumes:

- An Eyeful of Emily (books 1–4, 2007)
- Eyespy Emily Eyefinger (books 5–8, 2008)
