= Commonwealth Poetry Prize =

The Commonwealth Poetry Prize was an annual poetry prize established in 1972, for a first published book of English poetry from a country other than the United Kingdom. It was initially administered jointly by the Commonwealth Institute and the National Book League.

In 1985 the prize received sponsorship from British Airways. £11,000 prize money was provided for the prize, which was advertised as "the world's most comprehensive award for poetry".

Poems by 35 winners of the prize, each introduced with a brief biographical note, were collected in a 1987 anthology, Under another Sky.

The prize was discontinued in 1987, and a Commonwealth Writers Prize established in its place.

== Commonwealth prize winners ==
| Year | Winners |
|---|---|
| 1972 | Chinua Achebe, Beware Soul Brother (1971); George McWhirter, Catalan Poems (1971); Commended: Richard Ntiru, David Mitchell |
| 1973 | Wayne Brown, On the Coast (1972) |
| 1974 | Dennis Scott, Uncle Time (1973) |
| 1975 | |
| 1976 | Michael Jackson, Latitudes of Exile: Poems 1965–1975 (1976); Runners-up: Peter Kocan, The Other Side of the Fence co-runner-up (1976) Robin Thurston 'Believed Dangerous - 58 Poems' 1976 published by Queensland University Press. |
| 1977 | Arun Kolatkar, Jejuri (1976); Runner-up: R. Parthasarathy, Rough Passage (1977) |
| 1978 | Timoshenko Aslanides |
| 1979 | Brian Turner, Ladders of Rain (1978); Gabriel Okra |
| 1980 | Shirley Geok-lin Lim, Crossing the Peninsula (1980); Audrey Longbottom, Relatives and Reliques (1979) |
| 1981 | Philip Salom, The Silent Piano (1980) |
| 1982 | Peter Goldsworthy, Readings from Ecclesiastes: Poems (1982) |
| 1983 | Grace Nichols, I is a Long-Memoried Woman (1983) |
| 1984 | David Dabydeen, Slave Song (1984); Runner-up: Syd Harrex, Atlantis and other Islands. |
| 1985 | Lauris Edmond, Selected Poems (1984); Regional Prizes: Vikram Seth (Asia), Timothy Holmes, Michael Longley, Kobena Eyi Acquah, Gary Geddes |
| 1986 | Lorna Goodison, I am Becoming My Mother (1986); Regional Prizes: Anne Michaels (Americas), Iain Chrichton Smith |
| 1987 | Philip Salom, Sky Poems (1986); Regional Prizes: Tanure Ojaide (Africa) |
