= The Bellarmine Jug =

1984 novel by Australian writer Nicholas Hasluck

- Author: Nicholas Hasluck
- Language: English
- Genre: Fiction
- Publisher: Penguin
- Publication date: 1984
- Publication place: Australia
- Media type: Print
- Pages: 260 pp.
- ISBN: 0140072527
- Preceded by: The Hand That Feeds You
- Followed by: Truant State

The Bellarmine Jug (1984) is a novel by Australian writer Nicholas Hasluck. It was originally published by Penguin in Australia in 1984.

== Synopsis ==
In 1948 a student lawyer at the Hague discovers that the Dutch Government has potentially covered up the true story, and political implications, of the Batavia, a Dutch ship which was wrecked on a small island off the west coast of Australia in 1629. The resultant orgy of murder became known as one of the "worst horror stories in maritime history".

== Critical reception ==
Writing in The Canberra Times reviewer Susan McKernan noted: "Nicholas Hasluck's fourth novel is an historical mystery enclosed in a spy story," although the novel "despite the elements of mystery and thriller, is concerned with more abstract legal questions. Hasluck is more interested in the balance between justice for the individual and the good of the state."

== Awards ==
- Victorian Premier's Prize for Fiction, winner 1984

== Publication history ==
After its original publication in 1984 in Australia by publisher Penguin the novel was later reprinted by Penguin in 1985.

== See also ==
- 1984 in Australian literature
