= Audrey Longbottom =

Australian poet

Audrey Clarice Longbottom (c.1922 – 1986) was an Australian poet.

== Life ==
Longbottom was born in Coramba, New South Wales, around 1922. After leaving school aged fourteen, she later attended the University of Wollongong as a mature student. She then began to write poetry and prose.

Longbottom won the Commonwealth Poetry Prize in 1980, and the Grenfell Henry Lawson Prize in 1981. She died on 21 April 1986 at Cremorne, New South Wales.

== Works ==
- Relatives and reliques. Sydney: Wentworth Books, 1979.
- (with Susan McGowan and Kathryn Purnell) Trillium : a selection of poetry. Newtown, Vic.: Neptune Press, 1983.
- The solitary islands. Sydney: Ollif Pub. Co., 1985.
