= Allan Stomann =

Australian cartoonist and illustrator (born 1943)

- Born: 1943 (age 82–83) Melbourne, Australia
- Notable works: Nothing at All Rhymes; Clancy Carruthers with Ted Ashby; My Learn-to-take-photos Book; Selby the Talking Dog Series

Allan Stomann (born 1943) is an Australian cartoonist and illustrator. He is best known for illustrating children's books, notably the long-running and award-winning Selby the Talking Dog series by author Duncan Ball. His work reached a wide audience through the popular children's school songbooks published by the Australian Broadcasting Corporation in the 1970s and 1980s, and cartoons in the Australian Women's Weekly in the early 1980s.

== Career ==
Born in Melbourne, Stomann entered the Art School at Swinburne Technical College in 1959, where fellow students in his year included Keith McMenomy (later author of Ned Kelly: The Authentic Illustrated History). In July 1965, he was one of a number of artists (including Noel Counihan and Louis Kahan) to exhibit at the Stagecoach Gallery in Queens Road, Melbourne. Stomann later spent some time working in Great Britain, where he had a stint as an illustrator on thirty episodes of the children's TV series Jackanory, broadcast between May 1969 and November 1970. During this time, he also illustrated a book of children's poetry, Nothing at All Rhymes, published by Paul Hamlyn in London (1969) and later in Sydney (1971).

In the mid-1970s, Stomann took over from Tony Oliver as illustrator of the children's songbooks published annually by the Australian Broadcasting Corporation to accompany a radio series used as a teaching aid in primary schools. Stomann illustrated all of the editions of this songbook between 1976 and 1986 (except for two 1982 editions, both illustrated by Bob Graham) in the distinctive and colourful style that became his trademark. Around 1980, he began to regularly contribute cartoons and illustrations to the Australian Women's Weekly. Although best known for his children's book illustrations (notably the long-running Selby series, by Duncan Ball, published for more than two decades from 1985), Stomann has also, since the early 1980s, contributed artwork to humorous or instructional books for adults. He has also designed sleeves for LP records by popular children's entertainer Peter Combe, including Toffee Apple (1987) and Spaghetti Bolognaise (1988).

In November 1983, Stomann registered his business as Allan Stoman & Associates Pty Ltd. It continues to operate under that name, based in McMahons Point, Sydney.

== Works ==
=== Early works ===
- Nothing at All Rhymes (London: Paul Hamlyn, 1969)
- Clancy Carruthers with Ted Ashby, My Learn-to-take-photos Book (Sydney: Hamlyn, 1971)
- Marcia Hatfield, Eddie's Numbers (Sydney: Hamlyn, 1972)
- Coralie Rees, What Happened After? Nursery Rhyme Sequels (Sydney: Paul Hamlyn, 1972)
- Lydia Pender, Sharpur the Carpet Snake (Melbourne: Cheshire, 1976)
- Bill Wannan, Crooked Mick of the Speewah and Other Tall Tales (Sydney: Angus & Robertson, 1977)
- Hundreds and Thousands of Things to Do (Sydney: Rigby in association with Beckett Green Publishing, 1978)
- John Lapsley, Ask a Silly Question Answers to Silly Questions (Sydney: Rigby Limited/Ian Green Books Pty Ltd, 1979)

=== ABC Sing books ===
- Everybody Sing! (Sydney: ABC, 1976)
- Sing Sing Sing (Sydney: ABC, 1977)
- Let's Sing! (Sydney: ABC, 1978)
- All Together Sing (Sydney: ABC, 1979)
- Sing! (Sydney: ABC, 1980)
- Let's All Sing! (Sydney: ABC, 1981)
- Sing Along (Sydney: ABC, 1983)
- Sing On! (Sydney: ABC, 1985)
- Sing! (Sydney: ABC, 1986)

=== Selby the Talking Dog series ===
- Duncan Ball, Selby's Secret (North Ryde: Angus & Robertson, 1985)
- Duncan Ball, Selby Speaks (North Ryde: Angus & Robertson, 1988)
- Duncan Ball, Selby Screams (North Ryde: Angus & Robertson, 1989)
- Duncan Ball, Selby Supersnoop (Pymble: Angus & Robertson, 1995)
- Duncan Ball, Selby Space Dog (Pymble: Angus & Robertson, 1996)
- Duncan Ball, Selby Snowbound (Pymble: HarperCollins,1998)
- Duncan Ball, Selby Surfs (Pymble: Angus & Robertson, 1999)
- Duncan Ball, Selby's Selection (Pymble: HarperCollins, 2001)
- Duncan Ball, Selby Stardom (Pymble: Angus & Robertson, 2002)
- Duncan Ball, Selby Sorcerer (Pymble: Angus & Robertson, 2003)
- Duncan Ball, Selby Scrambled (Pymble: Angus & Robertson, 2004)
- Duncan Ball, Selby's Shemozzle (Pymble: Angus & Robertson, 2005)
- Duncan Ball, Selby Shattered (Pymble: Angus & Robertson, 2006)
- Duncan Ball, Selby Santa (Pymble: Angus & Robertson, 2007)
- Duncan Ball, The Joke's on Selby (Pymble: Angus & Robertson, 2008)
- Duncan Ball, Selby Sprung (Sydney: Angus & Robertson, 2011)
- Duncan Ball, Selby Celebrates (Sydney: Angus & Robertson, 2015)

=== Other Books for Children ===
- John Dineen, The Make Your Own Creepy Spooky Horrors Book (Sydney: Angus & Robertson, 1984)
- David Harris (ed), Loads and Loads of Limericks (Sydney: Angus & Robertson, 1985)
- Wayne Campbell, What a Catastrophe! (Sydney: Ashton Scholastic, 1986)
- Margaret Roc, Oodles of Noodles (Sydney: Hodder & Stoughton, 1987)

=== Books for Adults ===
- Bill Pigeon & Clarrie King, Humour in the Weekly (Melbourne: Currey O'Neil, 1983)
- Mike Gibson, The Best of Mike Gibson: A Humorous Look at Everyday Aussie Life (Sydney: Collins, 1983)
- John & Judy Kidd, Dr Kidd on Sleep Problems What To Do When Your Child Won't Sleep (Sydney: Doubleday/Transword Publishers Australia Pty Ltd, 1987)
- Eric Smith, An Accidental History of Words: A Lighthearted Look at the Things we Say (Sydney: Bay Books, 1988)
- Kerry Cook, ABC Child Safety: a Handy Guide to Childproofing your Home (Sydney: Simon & Schuster, 1989)
- Allan Stomann, The Best of Stomann (Mosman: Wellbeing, 1996)
- Steve Biddulph, The Secret of Happy Children (Sydney: Angus & Robertson, 1997)
- Doug Malouf, How to Kiss And Keep Your Customers, and Kick the Competition! (Sydney: DTS International, 1997)

=== Album Covers ===
- Chris Kirby, Iskybibble: starring Chris Kirby (1971) (Violet's Holiday, 45 rpm, VHK-4455)
- Chris Kirby, Iskybibble: The Three Witches; The Little Star (1970s)
- Chris Kirby, Iskybibble, Volume 2: Iskybibble and a Fish Called Fingers (1970s)
- Peter Combe, Toffee Apple (1987) (ABC Records/Festival L27206)
- Peter Combe, Spaghetti Bolognaise (1988) (ABC Records/Polygram Records 836 0391-1)
- Chris Kirby, The Adventures of Iskybibble (2006) (Southern Cross Music; collecting Volumes 1 & 2)
