= Cuthbert's Babies =

Children's Book by Pamela Allen

- Front cover, designed by Pamela Allen
- Author: Pamela Allen
- Illustrator: Pamela Allen
- Cover artist: Pamela Allen
- Language: English
- Genre: Children's book
- Published: 2003
- Publisher: Penguin Books Australia
- Publication place: Australia
- Media type: Print (paperback)
- Pages: unpaginated (28)
- Awards: 2004 New Zealand Post Book Award
- ISBN: 978-0143500858

Cuthbert's Babies is a 2003 children's picture book written and illustrated by Pamela Allen. Published by Penguin Books Australia, It is about a boy who resents the arrival of baby quadruplets and how he accepts them.

== Reception ==
Cuthbert's Babies has been reviewed by Reading Time and Good Reading magazine that wrote "Although not remarkable, this is another solid book from a favourite Australian author/illustrator." while The New Zealand Herald called it "a hilarious tale".

Miyuki Hisaoka in discussing "social roles within a family structure" noted that "Cuthbert's Babies arrives at an analogous conclusion, with Cuthbert and his mother lying on his bed reading a book together in a reprise of the opening page" and "that readers can align with Cuthbert's feeling of alienation without particularly empathizing with him".

It has also been used in schools, was on the 2004 Storylines Notable Book Awards Picture Books List. and won the 2004 New Zealand Post Book Award in the Picture Book category.
