= List of Selby books =

Selby is a self titled novel series written by Australian author Duncan Ball and illustrated by Allan Stomann or M.K. Brown. The books chronicle the adventures of the eponymous talking dog Selby, together with his owners Dr and Mrs Trifle. Since the release of the first book, Selby's Secret, there have been fifteen other releases and three companion books. The books were intended for younger children but it has spanned to other age groups. So far, there have been 16 short story books, 2 joke books and one "selection" in the Selby Series.

== Selby's Secret ==
Selby's Secret is the first book in the Selby Series by Duncan Ball. It was first published in 1985 (and once again in 2000) and is the oldest book in the series.

=== Stories ===
==== Selby's Secret ====
Selby understands human talk while watching Hearthwarm Hearth, a show about a butler working in a huge mansion. Selby decides to learn how to speak the language by practising in front of a mirror while the Trifles were away. The now intelligent Selby decides to make this the Trifles' gift for Christmas until he realises that it would ruin his life forever, therefore keeping his ability a secret.

==== Professor Krakpott's Puzzle ====
When Selby's cold causes a gift to be broken, Selby must try to piece the plate back together before the professor arrives.

==== Aunt Jetty Drops In ====
Selby exposes his secret when Aunt Jetty steps on his tail.

==== The Screaming Skull with Eyes that Glowed with Terror ====
A horror story written by Selby seems to come true...

==== By the Skin of His Teeth ====
Selby absent-mindedly whistles while listening he's being cured from a toothache.

==== A Snake in the Grasp ====
A boa constrictor starts "squeezing" Selby.

==== Wiild West Willy Rides Again ====
Selby talks to Willy to foil his wicked attempt to win the egg and spoon race.

==== Selby's Secret Hangs in the Balance ====
Selby is mistaken for a circus dog and has to walk the tightrope.

==== Too many Cooks ====
Aunt Jetty's dog Crusher destroys a cake and Selby attempts to create a new one.

==== The Enchanted Dog ====
Selby accidentally knocks out Postie Paterson in a play and has to take his part.

==== The Shampooed Pooch ====
Selby tries to foil Cousin Wilhemina's attempt to win the Bogusville Canine Society's annual god show.

==== Raid on Planet Kapon ====
Following a blackout at the Bogusville Bijou, Selby experiences the events of the movie in real life.

==== Selby Delivers the Goods ====
After hearing that the Trifles didn't order peanut prawns, Selby calls the Spicy Onion for some and to have them delivered to Selby's House - only to find out that the food was for the Fire Brigade.

==== Selby's Beautiful Body ====
After being unable to fit through a hole, Selby thinks that he's put on weight.

==== Lucky Millions ====
Selby wins a viewers' phone-in prize - only to realise that the winner has to sign a form.

==== A Busman's Holiday ====
Selby didn't realise that the "dream holiday" won from the phone-in prize is not as dream-like as he thought.

== Selby Speaks ==
Selby Speaks is the 2nd book in the Selby books. It was published in 1988.

== Selby Screams ==
Selby Screams is the 3rd book in the Selby books. It was published in 1989.

== Selby Supersnoop ==
Selby Supersnoop is the 4th book in the Selby books. It was published in 1995.

=== Stories ===
- Selby Super Snoop
- Selby in Suspense
- Selby on the Loo(se)
- The Furred Frenzy
- Selby Bites Back
- Pegleg Peggy's Treasure
- Selby Home and Hosed
- The JAWS that Snatch
- Selby Supersnout
- Selby Unstuck
- Smoochy Pooch
- Phantom Footprints
- Underground Underdog
- High Hat Harry the Happy Hypnotist

== Selby Spacedog ==
Selby Spacedog is the 5th book in the Selby books. It was published in 1996.

=== Stories ===
- Sunny Daze
- The Dangling Dog
- Books, Bombs and Book Weel
- Daggers of Death
- Bogusville Bonanza
- Tower in the Terror
- Selby's Solo
- Selby in Cyberspace
- Selby Dyes
- Selby Confesses
- Selby Superpooch
- Bungy Bungle
- Selby, Spacedog

== Selby Snowbound ==
Selby Snowbound is the 6th book in the Selby books. It was published in 1998.

=== Stories ===
- Nurse Selby
- Selby Lovestruck
- Selby Super-Seller
- The Paddle-Pup
- Selby's Surprise
- Selby House Bound
- Dr Trifle's War of Words
- The Dapper Dog
- Selby's Statue
- The Sky Eye Spy
- Selby's Salsa
- Selby Slugs Aunt Jetty
- Selby Snowbound

== Selby Surfs ==
Selby Surfs is the 7th book in the Selby books. It was published in 1999.

=== Stories ===
- Selby Surfs
- Selby Stuck
- Selby's Lamington Drive
- Saddle-Sore Selby
- The S-Files
- Selby's Set-Up
- Soop-Adoop-Aloo
- Peep-Dipper
- Selby's Doze Code
- Selby's High Q
- Selby Doomed
- Selby Sprung
- Selby Submerged

== Selby Snaps ==
Selby Snaps is the 8th book in the Selby books. It was published in 2000.

=== Stories ===
- Bogusville's Big Belly-Buster Bash
- Tricks and Treats
- Dr Trifle's Travelling TOOT
- Bombs Away
- The Whole Truth
- Selby Sold
- Cyclone Selby
- Selby Smitten
- Selby Slammed
- Swordfighter Selby
- Selby God-King
- Selby (Suddenly) Snaps!

== Selby Splits ==
Selby Splits is the 9th book in the Selby books. It was published in 2001.

=== Stories ===
- Selby Spiderdog
- Dear Deirdre
- Cloud Blaster
- The Tomb of the Dancing Dead
- Selby's (Great) Expectations
- Neat Streets
- Selby's New York Adventure
- Sticks and Stones
- Madame Mascara's Passion Potion
- Selby Survives
- Santa Selby
- Selby Splits

== Selby's Stardom ==
Selby's Stardom is the 10th book in the Selby books. It was published in 2002.

== Selby Sorcerer ==
Selby Sorcerer is the 11th book in the Selby books. It was published in 2003.

=== Stories ===
- Selby Fly-Guy
- Room Rage
- Selby's Shrink
- Quiz Whiz
- Sahara Selby
- Selby on the Nose
- Selby Flips
- Selby Unflips
- Selby's Sight
- The Poem That Stopped Bogusville
- That Sort-of Smile

==== Selby Sorcerer ====
Mrs and Dr Trifle leave a sorcery set for Willy and Billy as a birthday present. Selby has a play with the set and then puts it back. When Willy and Billy come they fight over the sorcery set until they find Selby and chase him around the house. Just then Selby picks up a wand that came with the sorcery set and then Willy and Billy become nice. Selby makes Billy and Willy his slaves and make them buy him some peanut prawns with their birthday money as well as doing other chores. When the Trifles come back Willy and Billy are still nice but when Willy says that Selby has the wand, Selby eats the wand in order to stop his secret from coming out. Willy and Billy start being horrid again as their wand has gone. This leads to the Trifles sending Willy and Billy right home. Mrs Trifle tells Selby that she hopes they had not hurt him, but he will always be their magic little dog. Selby then thinks And living with you two is all the magic I need and goes to sleep happily ever after.

== Selby Scrambled ==
Selby Scrambled is the 12th book in the Selby books. It was published in 2004.

== Selby's Shemozzle ==
Selby's Shemozzle is the 13th book in the children's book series about Selby the talking dog. It is written by Duncan Ball and illustrated by Allan Stomann. This book frequently uses the word "shemozzle" which means a disaster or catastrophe.

=== Stories ===
==== Selby's Shemozzle ====
After listening to a tape of Gary Gagg's best jokes, the problem arises that Gary is afraid to tell jokes in Bogusville because he thinks that everyone will hate him after his "killer joke." Gary's killer joke, according to Gary, was a joke which was unintended. Gary had meant to say the normal joke but his mouth, which seemed to have a "mind of its own," said a different punchline, ending in a killer joke and forcing Gary to play the joke on a tape and listen to it many times until he got used to the joke. However, Mrs Trifle asks Gary to tell the elephant and mouse joke which Gary has tried to improve, but with no success.

Later, Gary Gaggs tries to help Mrs Trifle record her speech about the closing of Bogusville hospital, which she has to broadcast via radio, while Selby tries to act like Gary and tells the elephant and mouse joke, but the joke turns into a killer joke. Later Selby records the joke and plays it over and over until he is tired of it, unaware that the tape was exactly the same one which Mrs Trifle recorded her speech on.

When the speech is broadcast on the radio, it turns out that the wrong side of the tape was played, the side which Selby recorded his joke on. The killer joke causes many minor injuries throughout Bogusville and in the end Bogusville hospital was not closed down due to "joke injuries."

==== Other Stories ====
- Selby's Stash of Cash
- Selby and the Chocolate Factory
- Sylvia's Secret
- You Lucky Dog, You!
- The Blood of the Wolfman
- Seeing-Eye Selby
- Dry-Mouth Drama
- Selby's Secret Diary
- See-Through Selby
- See-Through Selby's Return
- See-Through Selby's Return (Again)

== Selby Shattered ==
Selby Shattered is currently the 14th, book in the Selby Series. It was published in 2006.

Cover art of Selby Shattered

=== Stories ===
- Selby Castaway
- Gary Gaggs and the Ghostly Gagster
- The Search for Selby
- Selby Shorn
- Selby Ties the Knot
- Selby Meets the Triple Terror
- Selby's Shadow
- The Movie Magic of Jigsaw Jabbar
- The Story of a Story

==== Selby Shattered ====
The story begins with Selby unable to move and the Trifles worried about Selby. It turns out that Dr Trifle had invented a new type of water called "Nice"- standing for "Not ice." This water freezes in the heat instead of the cold. It turns out that Selby had accidentally drunk the Nice because he was thirsty. Many people tried to melt Selby but nothing, not even electricity or tickling or jiggling, worked. However, Selby's brain is still active but he is also put on display and becomes an attraction- "The Frozen Dog." Later he is moved to Professor Krakpott's "Museum of Old and Crusty Things" where Pindy, Windy and Sindy, The Terribble Terror," shatters Selby into hundreds and thousands of pieces. Suddenly, just before Selby was swept away, Jigsaw Jabbar reassembles Selby as though it was a puzzle.After he is reasembled his Life is saved for Dr Trifle melts Selby.

== Selby Santa ==
Selby Santa is the 15th book in the Selby books. It was published in 2007.

== Selby Sprung ==
Selby Sprung is the final, and 16th, book in the Selby Series. It was published in 2010.

=== Stories ===
- Selby and the Evil Genius
- Selby and the Sky-Riter
- Gary Gaggs' Last Gig
- Selby's Fate
- Selby, Vampire Slayer
- Diary of a Dog
- Selby and the Curse of Death Island
- Bogusville's Baby Boom
- Selby's Last Stand
- Selby's End

== Selby's Joke Book ==
Selby's Joke Book is a book in the Selby book series. It was published in between Selby Snaps! and Selby Splits.

=== Plot ===
This book is full of Gary Gaggs's best jokes.

== Selby's Selection ==
Selby's Selection is a book in the Selby Series. It contains a selection of Selby's favourite stories and contains bios on each character as well as stand-up comedy acts and jokes by Gary Gaggs. There are also poems and plays. This book even contains a map of Bogusville, but Selby "changed lots of things."
