= Selby's Secret =

Children's novel by Duncan Ball

Selby’s Secret
- Author: Duncan Ball
- Cover artist: Allan Stomann
- Language: English
- Series: Selby series
- Genre: Children's novel
- Publication date: 1985 (reprinted 2004)
- Publication place: Australia
- Media type: Print (Paperback)
- Followed by: Selby Speaks

Selby's Secret is the first children's novel in the Selby series by Australian writer Duncan Ball, and was first published in 1985. It was reissued in 2004.

== Plot summary ==
Selby is the only talking dog in Australia – perhaps in the world. He longs to chat with his owners but fears loses his status as their beloved pet. Keeping his secret is not easy.

== Awards and nominations ==
Years after publication, the book won its first award, the 1987 Primary section in the Waybra Award. It also came fourth place in the 1987 Primary section of the Koala Awards. The book was also shortlisted many other awards including the 1993 Yabba Awards for young readers. It has been shortlisted for the Koala Awards for 1988-1991 as well as 1996, 1999, and 2000. In 2001 it was finally voted into the Koala Awards’ Hall of Fame.
