= Antipodes (story collection) =

Short story collection by David Malouf

- Author: David Malouf
- Language: English
- Publisher: Chatto and Windus
- Publication date: 1985
- Publication place: Australia
- Media type: Print
- Pages: 160 pp
- ISBN: 0701128518
- Preceded by: Harland's Half Acre
- Followed by: Untold Tales

Antipodes (1985) is a collection of short stories by Australian writer David Malouf. It was published by Chatto and Windus in 1985.

The collection includes 13 stories by the author from a variety of literary magazines.

== Contents ==
- "Southern Skies"
- "A Trip to the Grundelsee"
- "The Empty Lunch-Tin"
- "Sorrows and Secrets"
- "That Antic Jezebel"
- "The Only Speaker of his Tongue"
- "Out of the Stream"
- "The Sun in Winter"
- "Bad Blood"
- "A Change of Scene"
- "In Trust"
- "A Traveller's Tale"
- "A Medium"

== Dedication ==
- "To Judith Rodriguez and Thomas W. Shapcott."

== Critical reception ==
Writing in The Canberra Times reviewer Marion Halligan noted: "Most of the stories involve European-Australian confrontations, in their countries or ours. But these don't have the relatively simple complexities of Henry James, where the dichotomies of good and bad, positive and negative, vitality and corruption, in old and new societies, are clear enough. Here they are variable and muddled...Malouf is already admired as apoet and novelist. Readers of literary magazines (that is, almost nobody but would-be publishees of those magazines) will have read some of these stories before. It's good to have them collected together."

== Publication history ==
After its original publication in 1985 the collection was reprinted as follows:

- Penguin, Australia 1986
- Vintage, UK, 1999

The collection was also translated into Swedish in 1988, and German in 1999.

== Awards ==
The collection won the Victorian Premier's Literary Award Vance Palmer Prize for Fiction in 1985.

== See also ==
- 1985 in Australian literature
