= Peniel (collection) =

1991 poetry collection by Kevin Hart

- Author: Kevin Hart
- Language: English
- Genre: Poetry collection
- Publisher: Golvan Arts
- Publication date: 1991
- Publication place: Australia
- Media type: Print
- Pages: 59 pp.
- Awards: 1992 Grace Leven Prize for Poetry, joint winner
- ISBN: 0646001523

Peniel is a poetry collection by Australian poet Kevin Hart, published by Golvan Arts in Australia in 1991.

The collection contains 27 poems from a variety of sources, with some published here for the first time.

The collection was a joint winner of the 1992 Grace Leven Prize for Poetry.

== Contents ==
- "Gypsophila"
- "Gacela"
- "Firm Views"
- "Approaching Sleep"
- "The Ship"
- "That Bad Summer"
- "Haranguing Death"
- "Winter at Point Henry"
- "Facing the Pacific at Night"
- "Dispute at Sunrise"
- "Lullaby"
- "The Story"
- "The Map"
- "This Stone is Thinking of Vienna (Rudolf Carnap)"
- "'The Present King of France is Bald' (Bertrand Russell)"
- "'The Philosophy of Furniture' (Edgar Allen Poe)"
- "American Journal"
- "The Pleasure of Falling Out of Trees (for Emily Kratzmann)"
- "Winter Rain"
- "The Letter"
- "Peniel"
- "Making a Rat"
- "The Border (for Howard Felperin)"
- "The Historian of Silence"
- "The Black Telephone"
- "Reading at Evening"
- "The Gift"

== Critical reception ==
Reviewing the book for The Age newspaper poet and critic Thomas Shapcott noted that the collection is "very conscious of foundations, and of exclusions." He concluded his review by stating that the "theme of owning, and being owned, pervades this book and gives it a richness, rare in Australian poetry, that invites one to read, and re-read."

In The Canberra Times Geoff Page pointed out that the poet's previous work typically lay "between free verse and iambics. They often sounded as though they might have been very felicitously translated from a European language." This collection, he continued, was "extraordinarily formal." Page concluded his review by stating that there "is no doubt that at his most profound Kevin Hart, in this and earlier works, is telling us things that no other Australian poet is currently quite able to."

== Awards ==
- 1992 Grace Leven Prize for Poetry, joint winner

== See also ==
- 1991 in Australian literature
