= Lilian's Story (novel) =

1985 novel by Australian writer Kate Grenville

- Author: Kate Grenville
- Language: English
- Genre: Fiction
- Publisher: Allen & Unwin
- Publication date: 1985
- Publication place: Australia
- Media type: Print
- Pages: 211 pp.
- ISBN: 0868614939
- Preceded by: -
- Followed by: Dreamhouse

Lilian's Story (1985) is a novel by Australian writer Kate Grenville. It was originally published by Allen & Unwin in Australia in 1985.

== Synopsis ==
The story of Lilian Singer is based on the real-lfe character of Bea Miles (1902–73), an eccentric Sydney 'madwoman' who was given to walking the Sydney streets quoting Shakespeare and jumping into other people's taxis.

== Critical reception ==
Critic Peter Craven looked back on the book after it had been in print for thirty years: "Kate Grenville's Lilian's Story is one of the great Australian novels of the last thirty years. When it was first published in 1985, it was immediately hailed as a masterpiece...The first thing to notice about Lilian's Story is the richness of the language. And it's worth noting, in the light of Patrick White’s commendation, that the rhetorical, highly coloured language – both the writing looked at as the style of the novel and the richness of the first-person narrative that declares itself as Lilian's voice, as this super bright, superior, weird character telling her own story – is rich and poetical (some people would say to the point of being 'purple') in a way that shows White’s influence...Lilian’s Story is one of the most remarkable pieces of late-twentieth-century Australian fiction not only because of its richness of orchestration and the originality of its vision, but because it starts as an archetypal account of childhood, progresses into the splendours and miseries of Lilian as a young woman, and then presents her as a deranged old derelict, though a colourful and well-known one."

== Publication history ==
After its original publication in 1985 in Australia by publisher Allen & Unwin the novel was later reprinted as follows:

- Allen & Unwin, Australia, 1986

The novel was revised after suggestions from its American editor and published as follows:

- Viking, USA, 1986
- Allen & Unwin, Australia, 1991, 1995, 1996, 1997 and 2008
- Harcourt Brace, USA, 1994
- Picador, UK, 1994
- Canongate, UK, 2007
- Text Publishing, Australia, 2021

The novel was also translated into French in 2004.

== Film adaptation ==
In 1996 the novel was adapted as a feature film which was directed by Jerzy Domaradzki, from a screenplay by Steve Wright, featuring Toni Collette, Ruth Cracknell and Barry Otto in the lead roles.

== Awards ==
The novel won The Australian/Vogel Literary Award in 1984.

== See also ==
- 1985 in Australian literature
