= Mosman Library =

Public library in Mosman, Sydney, Australia

Coordinates: 33°49′32.72″S 151°14′31.29″E

- Location: Mosman, New South Wales, Australia
- Type: Public library
- Established: 1934

Mosman Library is a public library service provided by Mosman Municipal Council. It is located in Mosman, a suburb of Sydney, New South Wales.

== History ==
Mosman Library began as a free children's library in 1934, established by local resident Edith Allworth and her cousin, Bess Thomas. It was opened in a studio in Allworth's garden in Parriwi Road but grew quickly and was relocated to the stables of Killarney School, Dalton Road. In 1942 the library was moved to Dr Doak's house adjoining Mosman Public School on the corner of Military Road and Belmont Road.

The successful free children's library in Dr Doak's house was very attractive to Mosman Council, and after discussions with the library committee the council assumed responsibility for the service. The Mosman Municipal Library was established in 1945 and librarian Bess Thomas was appointed chief Librarian and placed on a salary of 350 pounds. She was the first female librarian appointed under the Library Act. Two positions for junior library assistant were advertised, and filled by Rosemary Kimber and Patricia Swonnell. By 1947 there was also a senior assistant librarian, Miss Newby-Fraser.

In January 1945 Mosman Council was one of the first to adopt the new Library Act, and the second council to actually provide a library service in New South Wales. By 1949 Mosman's library service was being studied by other municipalities and used as a model on which to establish similar services.

By 1952 the library had outgrown the Belmont Road premises and Mosman Council relocated the library to a house called Boronia on Military Road which it had recently purchased for 15,750 pounds. A major contributing factor to this move would have been the Department of Education's request for the library to vacate the Belmont Road premises.

After six months of ironing out transition problems, obtaining new stock and furnishings for the new premises the library was officially opened on 8 November 1952 by Bob Heffron, then deputy premier of NSW and minister for education. Over 1000 people attended the ceremony including librarians from interstate. Originally intended as premises for the municipal library, Mosman Historical Society and the Mosman Art Gallery, the library quickly expanded into the areas set aside for the historical collection and gallery. This expansion was due to an increase in membership and the associated demand for services, resulting in the art work being hung in council chambers. The historical collection was kept in Boronia in very cramped conditions.

By the early 1970s the library service had expanded considerably and the Library Council of New South Wales advised Mosman Council that Boronia was now too small. At the time the accepted official space for a public library serving the population of Mosman was 12,000 square feet (1,100 m^{2}) and Boronia was only 5,200 square feet (480 m^{2}).

In 1976 Mosman Council committed to building a new library, tenders were called for and construction commenced at the end of September 1977. The architectural firm of Edwards Madigan Torzillo and Briggs won the tender to design a new library. This firm had designed the High Court of Australia building in 1972 and were to design the National Gallery of Australia and the Sports Science and Medicine Facility at the Australian Institute of Sport in Canberra. In 1979 the Library moved to its new premises at its current location on Military Road.

In September 1984 Mosman Library was computerized, a consequence of the creation of SHORELINK formed with North Sydney Council, Municipality of Lane Cove, City of Willoughby and Manly Council. This new service was introduced without any interruptions to the library service and improved access to holdings and facilities increased the use of these libraries.
