= Your Shadow =

1984 Australian poetry collection by Kevin Hart

Your Shadow : (Poems 1980-1983)
- Author: Kevin Hart
- Language: English
- Genre: Poetry collection
- Publisher: Angus and Robertson
- Publication date: 1985
- Publication place: Australia
- Media type: Print
- Pages: 58 pp.
- Awards: 1985 NSW Premier's Prize for Poetry, winner; 1985 Victorian Premier's Prize for Poetry, joint winner
- ISBN: 0646001523

Your Shadow : (Poems 1980-1983) is a collection of poems by Australian poet Kevin Hart, published by Angus and Robertson in 1984.

The collection contains 46 poems from a variety of sources.

== Contents ==
- "The Ten Thousand Things"
- "Your Shadow : [1]"
- "This Day"
- "Jerusalem"
- "Easter Psalm"
- "The Tanks Move West"
- "Midwinter Summer"
- "The Road"
- "Rain Psalm"
- "The Storm"
- "Your Shadow : [2]"
- "Midsummer"
- "Flemington Racecourse"
- "Poem to My Brother"
- "For Marion, My Sister"
- "The Hammer"
- "The Beast"
- "North"
- "Flies"
- "The Will to Change"
- "Sunlight in a Room"
- "Your Shadow : [3]"
- "The Members of the Orchestra"
- "Mountains"
- "The South Pole"
- "The Real World"
- "Old Man Smoking a Pipe"
- "Your Shadow : [4]"
- "To the Spirit"
- "Two Prayers"
- "The Mirror"
- "The Lighthouse"
- "Come Back"
- "Four Poems"
- "The House"
- "The End of Summer"
- "Your Shadow's Songs"
- "Summers"
- "The Companion"
- "The Face"
- "Toscanini at the Dead Sea"
- "Till Sotell Deth Knoked at My Gate"
- "A Silver Crucifix Upon My Desk"
- "Latecomers"
- "The Last Day"
- "Poem to the Sun"

== Critical reception ==
Writing in The Age Monthly Review Gary Catalano noted that Hart's poetry is "a vehicle for his fundamental beliefs about the nature of the world", adding that the poetry is "studded with vivid and memorable details."

Lachlan Brown, of the University of Sydney, wrote that there are "three ways of reading Hart’s poetry using three 'shadows' that appear to hang over some of his early work. Firstly the representational shadow, secondly the shadow of death and thirdly a kind of theological shadow, which speaks some interesting things onto the other two shadows."

== Awards ==
- 1985 NSW Premier's Prize for Poetry, winner
- 1985 Victorian Premier's Prize for Poetry, joint winner

== See also ==
- 1984 in Australian literature
