= Syd Harrex =

Australian poet

Sydney Church Harrex (21 July 1935 – 29 May 2015), better known as S. C. Harrex or Syd Harrex, was an Australian poet. He was founding head of the Center for Research on New Literatures in English (CRNLE) at Flinders University and was runner up for the Commonwealth Poetry Prize in 1985 for Atlantis and Other Poems. His academic specialty was Indian Literature in English. A memorial volume on Harrex was published in 2016.
