= A Lion in the Night =

1985 book by Pamela Allen

- Author: Pamela Allen
- Illustrator: Pamela Allen
- Cover artist: Pamela Allen
- Language: English
- Genre: Children's picture book
- Published: 1985
- Publisher: Puffin Books Australia
- Publication place: Australia
- Media type: Print (paperback)
- Pages: unpaginated (31)
- ISBN: 978-0140509397
- OCLC: 1083738805

A Lion in the Night is a 1985 children's picture book written and illustrated by Pamela Allen. It is about a baby who makes a wish, transforms her toy lion into a real one for one night, and goes on an adventure.

== Reception ==
A Lion in the Night has been reviewed by the School Library Journal and Kirkus Reviews that called it "A nighttime romp" and wrote "Allen's funny drawings, full of lovable characters and amusing details .. are deployed across the double spreads in a series of rhythmical dances to echo the wonderfully cadenced text. The dream-adventure makes the night exciting, but leaves baby safe and sound when the sun rises, in this fantasy that begs to be shared aloud."

It has been read and taught in schools. and has inspired a number of theatrical productions.

It also received the 1986 Library and Information Association of New Zealand Aotearoa Russell Clark Illustration Award.

Illustrations for the book are held by the Mitchell Library.
