= Kevin Hart (poet) =

Anglo-Australian theologian, philosopher and poet

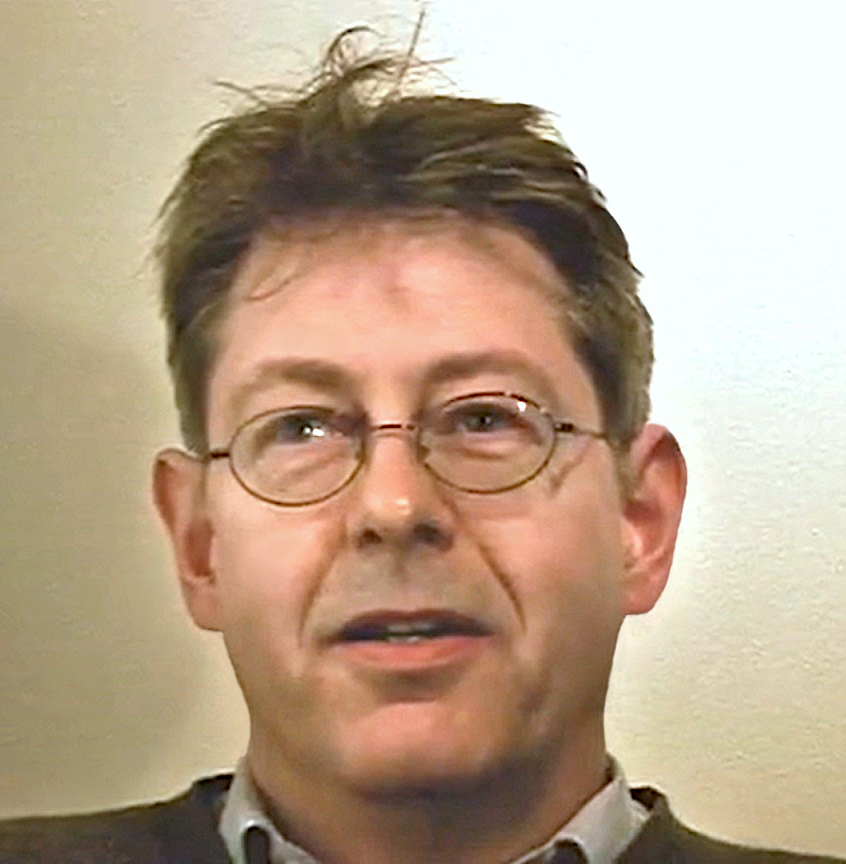
Kevin Hart (poet) in Speaking Portraits, c. 2003

Kevin John Hart FAHA (born 5 July 1954) is an Anglo-Australian theologian, philosopher and poet. He is currently Jo Rae Wright University Distinguished Professor at Duke Divinity School. He was the Edwin B. Kyle Professor of Christian Studies and Chair of the Religious Studies Department at the University of Virginia. As a theologian and philosopher, Hart's work epitomizes the "theological turn" in phenomenology, with a focus on figures like Maurice Blanchot, Emmanuel Levinas, Jean-Luc Marion and Jacques Derrida. He has received multiple awards for his poetry, including the Christopher Brennan Award and the Grace Leven Prize for Poetry twice.

== Biography ==
Hart was born on 5 July 1954 to James Henry Hart and his wife, Rosina Mary Wooton. Hart's family moved to Brisbane, Australia, in 1966. Hart attended secondary school at Oxley State High School, and gained his Bachelor of Arts degree in philosophy from the Australian National University. Hart received his PhD from the University of Melbourne in 1986. In 1991 he became associate professor of English and Comparative Literature at Monash University, rising to full Professor in 1995 and also becoming Director of the Centre for Comparative Literature and Cultural Studies and the Institute for Critical and Cultural Studies. He also taught in the Centre for Studies in Religion and Theology. He was elected a Corresponding Fellow of the Australian Academy of the Humanities in 1994. Leaving Monash in 2002, he became Professor of Philosophy and Literature at the University of Notre Dame, a position he held until 2007, when he became Edwin B. Kyle Professor of Christian Studies at the University of Virginia, a position he holds as of 2021. In 2019, he delivered the Gifford Lectures on Philosophia and Religions at the University of Glasgow. In Fall 2024, Hart will assume the Jo Rae Wright University Distinguished Professorship at Duke Divinity School, with a courtesy appointment in the Duke University Department of English.

== Theology and literary criticism ==
In his professional life, Kevin Hart is primarily known as a theologian who works in two areas: systematic theology and religion and literature. His work in systematic theology has not yet been collected into volumes but remains as uncollected essays and chapters. In general, Hart's approach is to ground theology in a phenomenology of the Christ, both a phenomenology of Jesus's words and actions, and an account of Jesus as performing epoche and reduction, especially through the parables. On Hart's understanding, the preaching of the Kingdom brings forth Christ's death and that preaching is confirmed by the Resurrection. His work on the Christian mystical tradition is focused on practices of contemplation. In terms of religion and literature, Hart has written extensively on English and French poetry and Christianity, especially Christian mysticism. Recent work has converged on Geoffrey Hill.

One facet of his work is extensive commentary on the writing of the atheist Maurice Blanchot to whom he has devoted four books: The Dark Gaze, The Power of Contestation, Nowhere without No, and Clandestine Encounters. Hart's analysis on Blanchot was praised by Peter Craven as combining "an attractive expository technique with an openness to speculative ideas". His work on Jacques Derrida and Samuel Johnson has also been praised, although one critic said that Hart's work on Johnson was "dubious" "and inconsistent in approach".

== Poetry ==
Hart's interests in poetry were piqued by an English teacher's presentation of Percy Bysshe Shelley's Ozymandias. In addition to Shelley, Hart also cites T. S. Eliot, Charles Baudelaire, Paul Éluard, Vasko Popa, Zbigniew Herbert and Gerard Manley Hopkins as influences. He first began writing poetry as a teenager, partly thanks to a Shelley anthology he had purchased and partly as an excuse to enjoy the Public Library's air conditioning during Brisbane's hot summers.

Critics have noted religious and philosophical themes in Hart's poetry. As Toby Davidson writes, "Kevin Hart's poetry cannot be separated from his multiple, enduring engagements with mysticism and mystical poetics. He is an innovator, suggesting new approaches to the mystical in the free facets of *attending*." Michael Brennan notes that the philosophical connection stems out of Hart's "long study into phenomenology", specifically connecting Hart's "The Room" to Heidegger's philosophy. Similarly, David McCooey detects the influence of Jacques Derrida, specifically Hart's use of metaphor and perspective.

Erotic and sensual themes are also pronounced in Hart's work. Nathaniel O'Reilly notes, for example, that even though most criticism of Hart focuses on his religious themes, Hart is also an "intensely physical and sensual poet," linking the material and the spiritual.

=== Reception ===
Hart's poetry has garnered multiple awards, including the Greybeal-Gowen Prize for Poetry in 2008, the John Shaw Neilson Poetry Award in 1977, the Mattara Poetry Award in 1982, 11the Wesley Michel Wright Award in 1984, the NSW Premier's Prize for Poetry in 1985, the Victorian Premier's Prize for Poetry in 1985, the Grace Leven Prize for Poetry in 1992 and 1995, the Christopher Brennan Award in 1999.

Critical response to Hart's poetry has varied. Harold Bloom, writing on the back cover of Kevin Hart's 1999 volume of poetry, Wicked Heat, strongly praised Hart, saying that he is the "most outstanding Australian poet of his generation", and one of "the major living poets in the English language". Bloom also names Hart as one of the eleven canonical writers of Australia and New Zealand in his book, The Western Canon: The Books and School of the Ages, specifically praising Hart's book Peniel and Other Poems. Other critics, such as Cyril Wong and Christian Sheppard, have also praised Hart's poetry. Some critics such as Geoffrey Lehmann and Pam Brown, however, have expressed negative views of Hart's work. while Christian Sheppard, reviewing the same volume, said "The primary pleasure of Hart's poetry, however, is an easy rhythmed, swiftly flowing line tracing the moment-by-moment impressions of an often impassioned yet always lucid mind". Lehmann, for instance, found Hart's 2008 volume, Young Rain to be self-indulgent and lacking in clear, specific meaning. Kevin Gardner, an American critic and professor, has noted that Hart's poems "have an annoying tendency toward abstraction" and a "narcissistic symbolism" that frustrates with "surreal obfuscation." Examples from Hart's poems that Gardner cites include "the curved eyelids of a young hand," "you kiss / Like a slack orchid tongue in Cairns," death "folded tightly / Like a parachute," "let’s eat the splinters in the house," "And filch a little mouse called fear."

== Published works ==
Books of Poetry

- The Departure, University of Queensland Press, 1978
- The Lines of Your Hand, Angus & Robertson, 1981, ISBN 9780207143724
- Your Shadow, HarperCollins Publishers Australia, 1984, ISBN 9780207149382
- Peniel, Golvan Arts, 1991. ISBN 9780646001524
- New and Selected Poems HarperCollins Publishers, 1995, ISBN 9780207186011
- Dark Angel, Dedalus Press, 1996, ISBN 9781873790878
- Nineteen Songs, Vagabond Press, 1999
- Wicked Heat Paper Bark Press, 1999, ISBN 9789057040764
- Madonna, Vagabond Press, 2000
- Flame Tree Bloodaxe, 2002, ISBN 9781852245450
- Night Music, Lexicon House, 2003
- Young Rain Bloodaxe Books, 2009, ISBN 9781852248291
- Morning Knowledge, University of Notre Dame Press, 2011, ISBN 9780268030933

Criticism

- Hart, Kevin (1989). The Trespass of the Sign. Fordham University Press. ISBN 9780823220502.; Fordham Univ Press, 2000, ISBN 9780823220502
- A. D. Hope, Oxford University Press, 1992, ISBN 9780195532685
- The Oxford Book of Australian Religious Verse, Oxford University Press, 1994, ISBN 9780195534986
- Losing the Power to Say 'I' (1996)
- Samuel Johnson and the Culture of Property. Cambridge University Press. 1999. ISBN 9780521651820. "Kevin Hart."
- How to Read a Page of Boswell, Vagabond Press, 2000, ISBN 9780646402727
- The Fifth Question and After: Poems for Tomas Salamun (2003)
- The Impossible Vagabond Press, 2006, ISBN 9780975150610
- Nowhere Without No: In Memory of Maurice Blanchot (editor; 2004)
- The Power of Contestation: Perspectives on Maurice Blanchot (with Geoffrey Hartman, 2004)
- Postmodernism: A Beginner’s Guide (2004)
- The Dark Gaze: Maurice Blanchot and the Sacred. University of Chicago Press. 2004. ISBN 9780226318110.
- Yvonne Sherwood; Kevin Hart, eds. (2005). Derrida and Religion: Other Testaments. Psychology Press. ISBN 9780415968881.
- Kevin Hart; Barbara Eileen Wall, eds. (2005). The Experience of God. Fordham University Press. ISBN 9780823225187.
- Counter-Experiences: Reading Jean-Luc Marion, University of Notre Dame Press, 2007, ISBN 9780268030780 (editor)
- The Exorbitant: Emmanuel Levinas between Jews and Christians (with Michael A. Signer, 2010)
- Clandestine Encounters: Philosophy in the Narratives of Maurice Blanchot (2010)
- Poetry and Revelation: For a Phenomenology of Religious Poetry, Bloomsbury Academic, 2017, ISBN 978-1472598301
