= Pamela Allen =

New Zealand children's writer and illustrator

Pamela Allen MNZM AM
- Born: Pamela Kay Griffiths; 3 April 1934 (age 92); Devonport, New Zealand
- Education: Elam School of Fine Arts
- Occupations: Writer and illustrator
- Writing career
- Period: 1980–present
- Genre: Children's picture books

Pamela Kay Allen MNZM AM (née Griffiths; born 3 April 1934) is a New Zealand children's writer and illustrator. She has published over 50 picture books since 1980. Sales of her books have exceeded five million copies.

== Early life and family ==
Born in the Auckland suburb of Devonport in 1934 to Esma Eileen (née Griffith) and William Ewart Griffiths, Allen studied at St Cuthbert's College, then the Elam School of Fine Arts at the University of Auckland, from where she graduated with a Diploma of Fine Arts in 1955. She then worked as a secondary school art teacher. She married sculptor Jim Allen in 1964. They moved to Sydney in about 1977, and after about 30 years returned to live in Auckland, New Zealand.

== Writing career ==
Allen published her first book, Mr Archimedes' Bath, in 1980. Since then she has written and illustrated more than 50 picture books for children.

She has won or been shortlisted for many awards as both a writer and illustrator. She won the Children's Book Council of Australia's Children's Picture Book of The Year Award in 1983 for Who Sank the Boat? and 1984 for Bertie and the Bear, and has been shortlisted for the same award on five other occasions. She twice won the Ethel Turner Prize in the New South Wales Premier's Literary Awards, in 1980 for Mr Archimedes' Bath and 1983 for Who Sank the Boat?.

Allen was awarded the International Board on Books for Young People honour diploma for illustration, for Who Sank the Boat?, in 1984.

In 1986, she received the Library and Information Association of New Zealand Aotearoa Russell Clark Illustration Award for her illustrations in A Lion in the Night.

In 2001, Who Sank The Boat?, first published in 1982, won the Gaelyn Gordon Award—given to the author of a New Zealand children's book that has been a favourite with children over a long period of time—from the New Zealand Book Council.

Allen returned to live in Auckland and in 2004 she won the Margaret Mahy Medal, New Zealand's top children's literature prize. In the 2005 New Year Honours, she was appointed a Member of the New Zealand Order of Merit, for services to children's literature.

Eight of her books have been adapted for the stage by Patch Theatre Company and performed at the Sydney Opera House.

Allen's daughter, Ruth Allen, a Melbourne-based glass sculptor, was commissioned by Penguin Australia in 2008 to create an artwork to celebrate sales of over five million copies of Allen's books.

Allen was appointed a Member of the Order of Australia in the 2024 Australia Day Honours for her "significant service to literature as an author".

An exhibition of Allen's work titled The Curious World of Pamela Allen opened at the State Library of New South Wales in September 2025. It is scheduled to run until 2027.

== Bibliography ==
- Mr Archimedes' Bath (1980)
- Who Sank the Boat? (1982)
- Bertie and the Bear (1983)
- A Lion in the Night (1985)
- Herbert and Harry (1986)
- Mr McGee (1987)
- Fancy That! (1988)
- I Wish I Had A Pirate Suit (1989)
- My Cat Maisie (1990)
- Black Dog (1991)
- Belinda (1992)
- Mr McGee Goes to Sea (1992)
- Mr McGee and the Blackberry Jam (1993)
- Alexander's Outing (1993)
- Clippity-Clop (1994)
- Waddle Giggle Gargle (1996)
- The Bear's Lunch (1997)
- Mr McGee and the Biting Flea (1998)
- Mr McGee and the Perfect Nest (1999)
- The Pear in the Pear Tree (1999)
- Inside Mary Elizabeth's House (2000)
- Can You Keep a Secret? (2000)
- Brown Bread and Honey (2001)
- The Potato People (2001)
- Daisy All-Sorts (2002)
- Cuthbert's Babies (2003)
- Grandpa and Thomas (2003)
- Mr McGee and the Big Bag of Bread (2004)
- Where's the Gold? (2005)
- Grandpa and Thomas and the Green Umbrella (2006)
- Share Said the Rooster (2006)
- Shhh! Little Mouse (2007)
- My First 123 (2007)
- Is Your Grandmother a Goanna? (2007)
- My First ABC (2008)
- Felix (2008)
- The Toymaker and the Bird (2009)
- Hetty's Day Out (2010)
- Nana’s Colours (2011)
- My Buggy Book of Animals (2011)
- The Little Old Man Who Looked Up at the Moon (2012)
- Mr McGee and the Elephants (2012)
- Bertie (2013)
- Fat Ferdie (2013)
- One Sunday (2014)
- The Man With Messy Hair (2015)
- The Big Fish (2016)
- A Bag and A Bird (2017)
- Mr McGee and His Hat (2024)
- Cock-a-Doodle-Doo! (2025)
