= Duncan Ball =

American-born Australian author

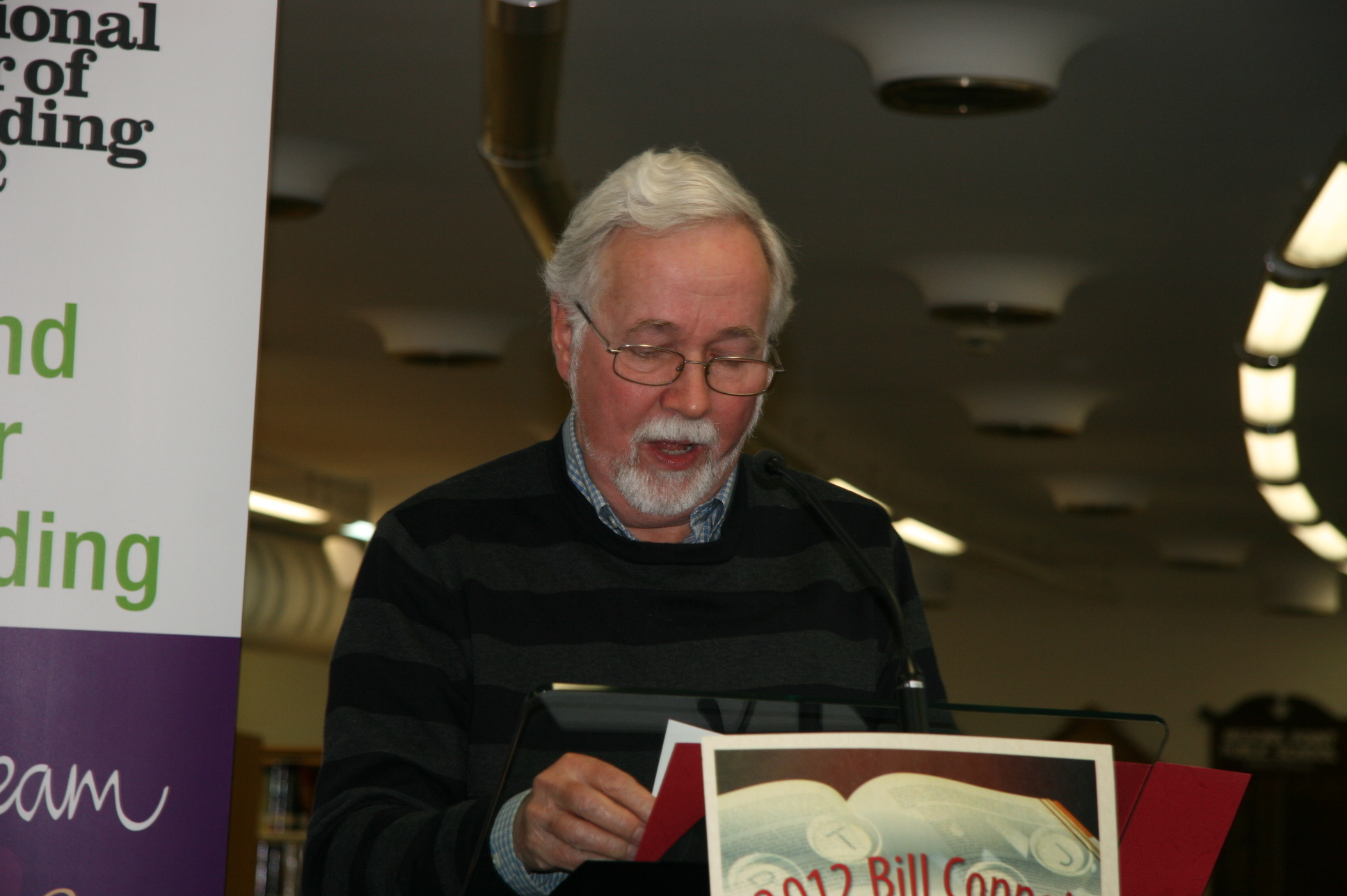
- Born: February 1941 (age 85); Boston, Massachusetts
- Occupation: Writer
- Spouse: Jill
- Children: 2
- Writing career
- Genre: Children's literature
- Notable work: Selby series
- Website: www.duncanball.com.au

Duncan Ball (born February 1941) is an American-born Australian author who has written the children's series Selby (about a talking dog named Selby who tries to keep his secret away from his owners) and Emily Eyefinger (about a girl who has an eye on her finger).

== Biography ==
=== Early life and education ===
Duncan was born in February 1941 in Boston, Massachusetts, United States, and was one of three children. When he was four, his family moved to Alaska, where he went to primary school. In his teens, Duncan moved to Madrid, Spain where he learned to speak Spanish. He finished high school in the United States, studied at Northeastern University and, later, at the University of Paris (Sorbonne). He has a degree in Mathematics from Boston University.

=== Career ===
Ball moved to Sydney in 1974 and worked as an industrial chemist. He wrote a novel for adults and later changed jobs to editor of the School Magazine at the Department of Education of New South Wales. He continued to work there for a few years, then resigned to become a full-time author, a profession which he continues today. Also for a few years he worked part-time for the South Australian Film Corporation looking for literary works to be adapted for film and television.

Duncan has written about eighty-five books, all but one of them are children's books, as well as plays and television scripts. His second children's book was Selby's Secret, which was published 6 March 1985. It is about a dog named Selby, who learned to talk while watching TV and struggles to keep his ability a secret (he must do this so his owners, the Trifles, do not put him to work around the house). Since this first book, 15 collections of the adventures of Selby have been published, as well as Selby's Selection and The Joke's on Selby, both featuring Selby's best antics, and two joke books.

In 1997, Duncan wrote the first Emily Eyefinger book, which is about a girl named Emily who has an eye on the end of her finger. Ten books have been published in this series. Duncan has also written the Piggott books, featuring the antics of a timid and thoughtful boy, Bert Piggott, and his good friend and child actress, Antigone Attwood. Duncan also wrote some picture books including "Jeremy's Tail" (illustrated by Donna Rawlins) and "My Dog's a Scaredy Cat" (illustrated by Craig Smith.

His latest book is a book of funny poems called "My Sister Has a Big Black Beard".

=== Marriage and children ===
Ball's wife Jill is a musician and a librarian. Duncan has two adult sons, Eliot and Ian, by his first wife, Vivian, and three grandsons.

== Published works ==
- The Great Australian Snake Exchange (Hutchinson, 1978)
- My Dog's a Scaredy-cat illustrated by Craig Smith (Walter McVitty Books, 1987)
- Jeremy's Tail illustrated by Donna Rawlins (Ashton Scholastic, 1990)
- The Spy Code Handbook with Ian Ball (Angus & Robertson, 1990)
- Piggott Place (Angus & Robertson, 1992)
- Grandfather's Wheelything (Simon & Schuster USA Books for Young Readers, 1994)
- Ty Daring and the Billion Dollar Nose (Scholastic, 1995)
- Quentin's Lunch (ABC Books, 1999)
- Piggotts in Peril (HarperCollins, 2002)
- My Sister has a Big Black Beard (HarperCollins Australia, 2009)
- The School is Driving Me Nuts and Other Funny Plays for Kids (Christmas Press, 2016)

The Ghost and... books:

- The Ghost and the Goggle Box (Angus & Robertson, 1984)
- The Ghost and the Shutterbug (Angus & Robertson, 1989)
- The Ghost and the Gory Story (Angus & Robertson, 1990)

The Case of... books:

- The Case of the Graveyard Ghost (Angus & Robertson, 1994)
- The Case of the Walkabout Clock (Angus & Robertson, 1994)
- The Case of the Midnight Zappers (Angus & Robertson, 1994)
- The Case of the Getaway Gold (Angus & Robertson, 1994)
- The Case of the Vampire's Wire (Angus & Robertson, 1994)
- The Case of the Runaway Bullet (Angus & Robertson, 1995)

=== Selby series ===
Illustrated by Allan Stomann

- Selby's Secret (Angus & Robertson, 1985)
- Selby Speaks (Angus & Robertson, 1988)
- Selby Screams (Angus & Robertson, 1989)
- Selby Supersnoop (Angus & Robertson, 1995)
- Selby Spacedog (Angus & Robertson, 1996)
- Selby Snowbound (Angus & Robertson, 1998)
- Selby Surfs (Angus & Robertson, 1999)
- Selby's Joke Book (Angus & Roberson, 2000)
- Selby Snaps! (Angus & Robertson, 2000)
- Selby Splits (Angus & Robertson, 2001)
- Selby's Stardom (HarperCollins, 2002)
- Selby's Side-Splitting Joke Book (HarperCollins, 2002)
- Selby Sorcerer (HarperCollins, 2003)
- Selby Scrambled (Angus & Robertson, 2004)
- Selby's Shemozzle (HarperCollins, 2005)
- Selby Shattered (HarperCollins Australia, 2006)
- Selby Santa (HarperCollins, 2007)
- The Joke's on Selby (HarperCollins Australia, 2008)
- Selby Sprung (Angus & Robertson, 2010)

Collected volumes:

- Selby's World (HarperCollins, 1995)
- Selby's Selection (HarperCollins, 2001)
- A Stack of Selby (HarperCollins, 2003)
- Selby the Wonder Dog (HarperCollins, 2004)

=== Emily Eyefinger ===
Illustrated by Craig Smith

1. Emily Eyefinger (Simon & Schuster Books for Young Readers, 1992)
2. Emily Eyefinger, Secret Agent (Simon & Schuster Books for Young Readers, 1993)
3. Emily Eyefinger and the Lost Treasure (Simon & Schuster Books for Young Readers, 1994)
4. Emily Eyefinger and the Black Volcano (Angus & Robertson, 2000)
5. Emily Eyefinger's Alien Adventure (Angus & Robertson, 2001)
6. Emily Eyefinger and the Devil Bones (HarperCollins, 2002)
7. Emily Eyefinger and the Balloon Bandits (Angus & Robertson, 2003)
8. Emily Eyefinger and the Ghost Ship (Angus & Robertson, 2004)
9. Emily Eyefinger and the Puzzle in the Jungle (Angus & Robertson, 2005)
10. Emily Eyefinger and the City in the Sky (HarperCollins, 2006)
11. Emily Eyefinger and the Secret from the Sea (HarperCollins, 2012)

Collected volumes:

- An Eyeful of Emily (books 1–4, 2007)
- Eyespy Emily Eyefinger (books 5–8, 2008)

Books co-written as John St Claire with Emily Rodda as the Teen Power series in Australia, Raven Hill Mysteries in the UK, and Help-For-Hire in the US:

- Green for Danger (Scholastic, Australia (1994))
- The Secret of Banyan Bay (Scholastic, Australia (1995))
- Crime in the Picture (Scholastic, Australia (1995))
- The Sorcerer's Apprentice (Scholastic, Australia (1995))

== Awards ==
- 1987: West Australian Young Readers Book Award (WAYBRA), Primary Section, Selby's Secret
- 1989: WAYBRA, Primary Section, The Ghost and the Gory Story
- 1990: WAYBRA, Primary Section, Selby Speaks
- 1991: WAYBRA, Primary Section, Selby Screams
- 1997: Kids' Own Australian Literature Award (KOALA), Junior Book category, Selby Spacedog
- 1997: WAYBRA, Young Readers' Section, Selby Supersnoop
- 1997: WAYBRA, Hoffman Award, Selby Supersnoop
- 1998: KOALA, Junior Book category, Selby Speaks
- 2000: KOALA, Junior Book category, Selby Snowbound
- 2001: KOALA Hall of Fame, Selby's Secret
- 2001: WAYBRA, Hoffman Award, Selby Surfs
- 2003: WAYBRA, Young Readers' Section, Selby's Stardom
- 2004: KANGA, Year 3–5 category, Selby Snaps
- 2005: Canberra's Own Outstanding List Award, Fiction for Young Readers, Selby's Stardom
- 2006: WAYBRA, Primary Section, Selby's Schemozzle
