= Hale & Iremonger =

Australian book publisher

- Founded: 1977
- Founder: Sylvia Hale, John Iremonger & Roger Barnes
- Country of origin: Australia
- Headquarters location: Sydney

Hale & Iremonger is an Australian independent publisher. It was founded in 1977 by Sylvia Hale, John Iremonger and Roger Barnes.

John left the company in 1980, moving to Allen & Unwin. By 2002, when Sylvia became involved in NSW state politics, some 500 books had been published on politics, urban history, women's studies and poetry.

In 2010 Hale & Iremonger's list was bought by Michael Rakusin, formerly of Tower Books.

== Selected publications ==
Books published by Hale & Iremonger include:

=== Nonfiction ===
- Bettison, Margaret; Summers, Anne (1979). Her story : Australian women in print 1788–1975. Anne Roberts (photographer). Hale & Iremonger. ISBN 978-0-908094-52-3.
- Roe, Jill, ed. (1980). Twentieth century Sydney : studies in urban and social history. Hale & Iremonger in association with the Sydney History Group. ISBN 978-0-908094-62-2.
- Webby, Elizabeth (1982). Early Australian poetry : an annotated bibliography of original poems published in Australian newspapers, magazines & almanacks before 1850. Hale & Iremonger. ISBN 978-0-908094-91-2.
- Dawson, Madge; Radi, Heather, eds. (1984). Against the odds fifteen professional women reflect on their lives & careers. Sydney, NSW Hale & Iremonger. ISBN 978-0-86806-183-2.

=== Biography and autobiography ===
- Magarey, Susan (1985). Unbridling the tongues of women : a biography of Catherine Helen Spence. Hale & Iremonger. ISBN 0868061506.
- Moyal, Ann (1995). Breakfast with Beaverbrook : memoirs of an independent woman. Hale & Iremonger. ISBN 978-0-86806-569-4.
- Stewart, Douglas (1983). Springtime in Taranaki : an autobiography of youth. Hale & Iremonger. ISBN 978-0-86806-096-5.

=== Poetry ===
- Dobson, Rosemary (1984). The three fates & other poems. Hale & Iremonger. ISBN 978-0-86806-133-7. Winner of the Grace Leven Prize for Poetry, 1985
- Kefala, Antigone (1988). European notebook. Hale & Iremonger. ISBN 978-0-86806-335-5.
- Skrzynecki, Peter; Dickerson, Robert (1989). Night swim : poems (1978–1988). Hale & Iremonger. ISBN 978-0-86806-363-8.
- Tranter, John (1982). Selected poems. Hale & Iremonger. ISBN 978-0-86806-029-3.

== Authors ==
Other authors of books published by Hale & Iremonger include Doris Brett, Hazel Edwards, Ross Fitzgerald, Libby Gleeson, Robert Hughes, Grace Karskens, Mark O'Connor, Ron Pretty.
